= List of best-selling Xbox 360 video games =

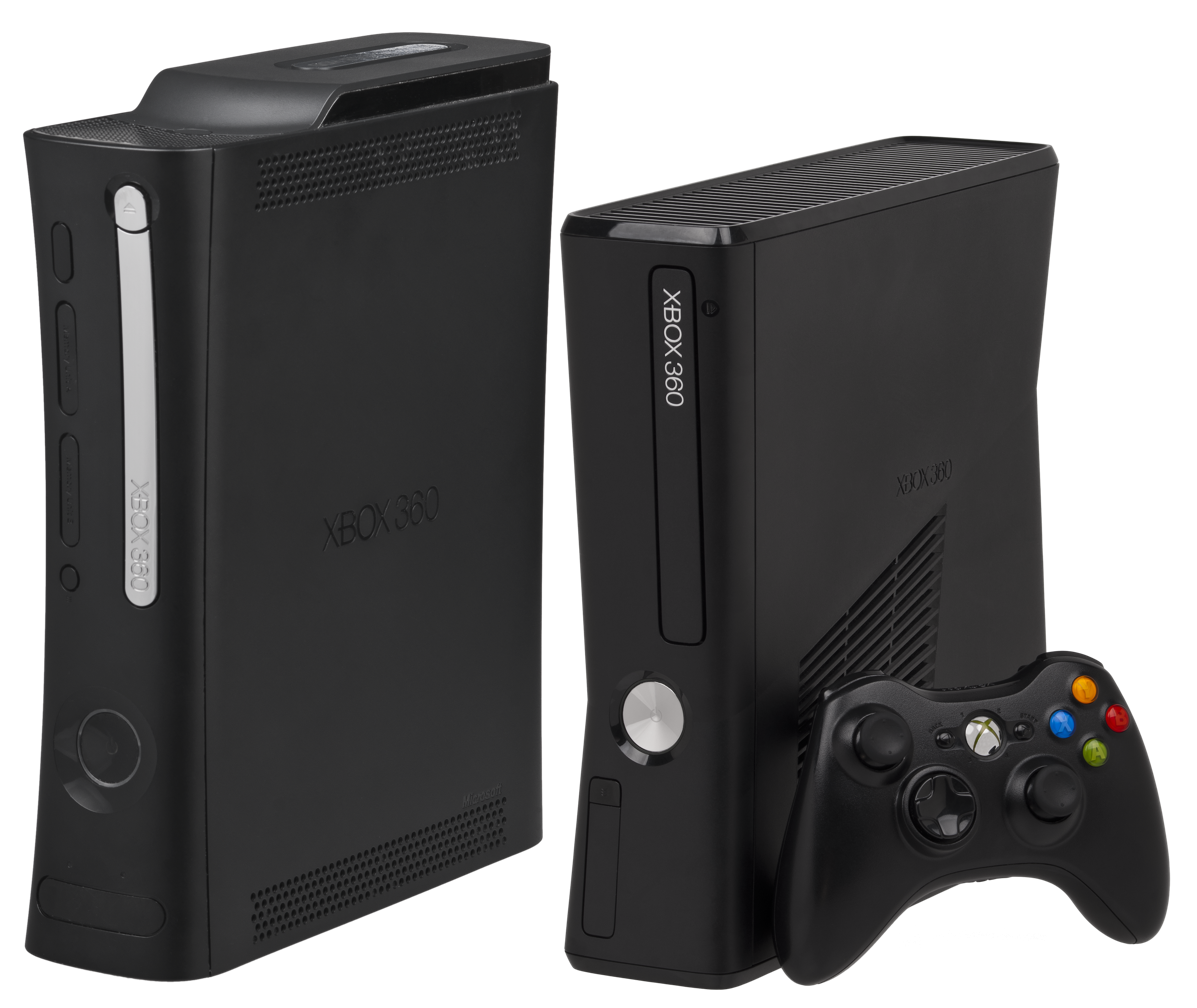
Xbox 360 Elite and Xbox 360 S consoles with controller

This is a list of video games for the Xbox 360 video game console that have sold or shipped at least one million copies. The best-selling Xbox 360 game is Kinect Adventures!, which was bundled with the Kinect accessory, selling 24 million units.

As of December 2009, over 353.8 million total copies of games had been sold for the Xbox 360.

== List ==
Game	Copies sold	Release date (Note: Only the initial release date on this platform is listed.)	Genre(s)	Developer(s)	Publisher(s)
Kinect Adventures!	24 million (Note: As of February 12, 2013, the Kinect sensor has sold 24 million units, each of which is bundled with a copy of Kinect Adventures.)	November 4, 2010	Adventure; sports	Good Science Studio	Microsoft Game Studios
Grand Theft Auto V	22.95 million (Note: Of the 90 million total units sold by April 2018, 25.5% of that total were for the Xbox 360 version.)	September 17, 2013	Action-adventure	Rockstar North	Rockstar Games
Minecraft: Xbox 360 Edition (Note: Xbox Live Arcade game)	22 million	May 9, 2012	Sandbox; survival	4J Studios	Microsoft Studios
Call of Duty: Modern Warfare 3	14.72 million	November 8, 2011	First-person shooter	Infinity Ward; Sledgehammer Games	Activision
Call of Duty: Black Ops	14.55 million	November 9, 2010	First-person shooter	Treyarch	Activision
Halo 3	14.5 million	September 25, 2007	First-person shooter	Bungie	Microsoft Game Studios
Call of Duty: Black Ops II	13.8 million	November 13, 2012	First-person shooter	Treyarch	Activision
The Elder Scrolls V: Skyrim	13.7 million (Note: 59% of 23,270,000 total units sold were for Xbox 360.)	November 11, 2011	Action role-playing	Bethesda Game Studios	Bethesda Softworks
Call of Duty: Modern Warfare 2	13.5 million (Note: Call of Duty: Modern Warfare 2 sales breakdown: Japan – 87,374 (original) and 3,944 (Platinum Collection); United Kingdom – 1 million)	November 10, 2009	First-person shooter	Infinity Ward	Activision
Red Dead Redemption	13.5 million (Note: Red Dead Redemption sales breakdown: Japan – 37,984; United Kingdom – 300,000; United States – 1.528 million)	May 18, 2010	Action-adventure	Rockstar San Diego	Rockstar Games
Grand Theft Auto IV	11.01 million (Note: Grand Theft Auto IV sales breakdown: Japan – 65,486 (original) and 6,453 (Platinum Collection); United Kingdom – 1 million; United States – 3.29 million)	April 29, 2008	Action-adventure	Rockstar North	Rockstar Games
Call of Duty: Ghosts	10.16 million	November 5, 2013	First-person shooter	Infinity Ward	Activision
Halo: Reach	9.87 million (Note: Halo: Reach sales breakdown: Japan – 53,126; North America – 5.74 million)	September 14, 2010	First-person shooter	Bungie	Microsoft Game Studios
Call of Duty 4: Modern Warfare	9.2 million (Note: Call of Duty 4: Modern Warfare sales breakdown: Canada – 78,000; Japan – 54,742 (original) and 39,222 (Platinum Collection); United Kingdom – 1 million; United States – 3.04 million)	November 5, 2007	First-person shooter	Infinity Ward	Activision
Gears of War	5 million (Note: Gears of War sales may include PC version.)	November 7, 2006	Third-person shooter	Epic Games	Microsoft Game Studios
Gears of War 2	5 million	November 7, 2008	Third-person shooter	Epic Games	Microsoft Game Studios
Batman: Arkham City	4.73 million	October 18, 2011	Action-adventure	Rocksteady Studios	Warner Bros. Interactive Entertainment
Fable II	3.5 million	October 21, 2008	Action role-playing	Lionhead Studios	Microsoft Game Studios
Batman: Arkham Asylum	3.48 million	August 25, 2009	Action-adventure	Rocksteady Studios	Square Enix
Call of Duty: World at War	3.35 million (Note: Call of Duty: World at War sales breakdown: United Kingdom – 600,000; United States – 2.75 million)	November 11, 2008	First-person shooter	Treyarch	Activision
Gears of War 3	3 million	September 20, 2011	Third-person shooter	Epic Games	Microsoft Studios
Left 4 Dead 2	3 million	November 17, 2009	First-person shooter; survival horror	Valve South	Valve
Halo 3: ODST	3 million	September 22, 2009	First-person shooter	Bungie	Microsoft Game Studios
Kinect Sports	3 million	October 9, 2010	Sports	Rare	Microsoft Game Studios
Assassin's Creed II	2.97 million (Note: Assassin's Creed II sales breakdown: Japan – 40,837; United Kingdom – 300,000; United States – 1.577 million)	November 17, 2009	Action-adventure; stealth	Ubisoft Montreal	Ubisoft
Star Wars: The Force Unleashed	2.77 million (Note: Star Wars: The Force Unleashed sales breakdown: United Kingdom – 200,000; United States – 923,000)	September 16, 2008	Action-adventure; hack and slash	LucasArts	LucasArts
Assassin's Creed	2.58 million (Note: Assassin's Creed sales breakdown: Canada – 60,000; Japan – 55,261; United Kingdom – 600,000; United States – 1.87 million)	November 13, 2007	Action-adventure; stealth	Ubisoft Montreal	Ubisoft
Dance Central	2.5 million	November 4, 2010	Music; rhythm	Harmonix	MTV Games
Lego Star Wars: The Complete Saga	2.36 million	November 6, 2007	Action-adventure	Traveller's Tales	LucasArts
L.A. Noire	2.32 million (Note: Of the total 4 million copies sold overall in its first month, 58% were the Xbox 360 version)	May 17, 2011	Action-adventure	Team Bondi	Rockstar Games
Marvel: Ultimate Alliance	2.08 million	October 24, 2006	Action role-playing	Raven Software	WW: Activision; JP: Interchannel
Uno	2.068 million	May 9, 2006	Card game	Carbonated Games	Microsoft Game Studios
Final Fantasy XIII	2 million	March 9, 2010	Role-playing	Square Enix 1st Production Department	Square Enix
Guitar Hero II	2 million	April 3, 2007	Music; rhythm	Harmonix	Activision
Saints Row	2 million	August 29, 2006	Action-adventure	Volition	THQ
Trials HD	2 million	August 12, 2009	Racing; puzzle	RedLynx	Microsoft Game Studios
The Elder Scrolls IV: Oblivion	1.87 million (Note: The Elder Scrolls IV: Oblivion sales breakdown: Japan – 72,274 (original) and 10,025 (Game of the Year Edition); United Kingdom – 300,000; United States – 1.49 million)	March 20, 2006	Action role-playing	Bethesda Game Studios	Bethesda Softworks; 2K Games
Madden NFL 09	1.87 million (Note: Sales data only reported for the United States.)	August 12, 2008	Sports	EA Tiburon	EA Sports
Dead Rising	1.8 million	August 8, 2006	Survival horror; beat ‘em up	Capcom Production Studio 1	Capcom
Rock Band	1.75 million (Note: Rock Band sales breakdown: United Kingdom – 100,000; United States – 1.65 million)	November 20, 2007	Music; rhythm	Harmonix	MTV Games
Madden NFL 07	1.72 million	August 22, 2006	Sports	EA Tiburon	EA Sports
Lost Planet: Extreme Condition	1.7 million	December 21, 2006	Third-person shooter	Capcom	Capcom
Guitar Hero III: Legends of Rock	1.65 million (Note: Guitar Hero III: Legends of Rock sales breakdown: Canada – 32,000; United Kingdom – 300,000; United States – 1.32 million)	October 28, 2007	Music; rhythm	Neversoft	Activision
Mass Effect	1.6 million	November 20, 2007	Action role-playing	BioWare	Microsoft Game Studios
Mass Effect 2	1.6 million	January 26, 2010	Action role-playing; third-person shooter	BioWare	Electronic Arts
Tom Clancy's Rainbow Six: Vegas	1.59 million (Note: Tom Clancy's Rainbow Six: Vegas sales breakdown: Japan – 18,592 (original) and 2,731 (Platinum Collection); United Kingdom – 300,000; United States – 1.27 million)	November 22, 2006	Tactical shooter; first-person shooter	Ubisoft Montreal	Ubisoft
Call of Duty 3	1.53 million (Note: Call of Duty 3 sales breakdown: Japan – 14,194; United Kingdom – 300,000; United States – 1.22 million)	November 7, 2006	First-person shooter	Treyarch	Activision
Madden NFL 08	1.51 million	August 14, 2007	Sports	EA Tiburon	EA Sports
Fallout 3	1.5 million (Note: Fallout 3 sales breakdown: Japan – 63,548 (original), 6,681 (Game of the Year Edition) and 4,262 (Platinum Collection); North America – 1.14 million; United Kingdom – 300,000)	October 28, 2008	Action role-playing	Bethesda Game Studios	Bethesda Softworks
BioShock	1.5 million	August 21, 2007	First-person shooter	2K Boston; 2K Australia	2K Games
Crackdown	1.5 million	February 20, 2007	Action-adventure	Realtime Worlds	Microsoft Game Studios
Perfect Dark Zero	1.5 million	November 22, 2005	First-person shooter; stealth	Rare	Microsoft Game Studios
Resident Evil 5	1.42 million (Note: Resident Evil 5 sales breakdown: France – 40,135; Japan – 123,817; United Kingdom – 200,000; United States – 1.06 million)	March 5, 2009	Third-person shooter	Capcom	Capcom
Tom Clancy's Ghost Recon Advanced Warfighter	1.41 million (Note: Tom Clancy's Ghost Recon Advanced Warfighter sales breakdown: Japan – 8,903 (original) and 1,622 (Platinum Collection); United Kingdom – 200,000; United States – 1.2 million)	March 9, 2006	Tactical shooter	Ubisoft Paris; Red Storm Entertainment	Ubisoft
Call of Duty 2	1.4 million	November 22, 2005	First-person shooter	Infinity Ward	Activision
Fight Night Round 3	1.29 million (Note: Fight Night Round 3 sales breakdown: Japan – 1,132; United Kingdom – 100,000; United States – 1.19 million)	February 20, 2006	Sports	EA Chicago	EA Sports
UFC 2009 Undisputed	1.23 million (Note: UFC 2009 Undisputed sales breakdown: United Kingdom – 200,000; United States – 1.03 million)	May 19, 2009	Sports	Yuke's	THQ
Dead or Alive 4	1.2 million	December 29, 2005	Fighting	Team Ninja	Tecmo
Guitar Hero World Tour	1.19 million (Note: Guitar Hero World Tour sales breakdown: United Kingdom – 200,000; United States – 924,000)	October 26, 2008	Music; rhythm	Neversoft	Activision
Tom Clancy's Rainbow Six: Vegas 2	1.06 million (Note: Tom Clancy's Rainbow Six: Vegas 2 sales breakdown: United Kingdom – 300,000; United States – 752,300; Japan – 18,533)	March 18, 2008	Tactical shooter; first-person shooter	Ubisoft Montreal	Ubisoft
Battlefield: Bad Company 2	1.04 million (Note: Battlefield: Bad Company 2 sales breakdown: Japan – 24,539; United Kingdom – 200,000; United States – 825,500)	March 2, 2010	First-person shooter	EA DICE	Electronic Arts
Rock Band 2	1.02 million	September 14, 2008	Music; rhythm	Harmonix	MTV Games
Gears of War: Judgement	1 million	March 19, 2013	Third-person shooter	People Can Fly; Epic Games	Epic Games
FIFA 11	1 million	October 28, 2010	Sports	Electronic Arts	Electronic Arts
FIFA 12	1 million	September 27, 2011	Sports	Electronic Arts	Electronic Arts
FIFA 13	1 million	September 25, 2012	Sports	Electronic Arts	Electronic Arts
FIFA 14	1 million	September 24, 2013	Sports	Electronic Arts	Electronic Arts
Halo Wars	1 million	February 26, 2009	Real-time strategy	Ensemble Studios	Microsoft Game Studios
Left 4 Dead	1 million	November 18, 2008	First-person shooter; survival horror	Valve South	Valve
Ninja Gaiden II	1 million	June 3, 2008	Action-adventure; hack and slash	Team Ninja	Microsoft
The Orange Box	1 million	October 10, 2007	First-person shooter; puzzle; compilation	Valve	Valve
Tom Clancy's Ghost Recon Advanced Warfighter 2	1 million	March 6, 2007	Tactical shooter	Ubisoft Paris; Red Storm Entertainment	Ubisoft
Viva Piñata	1 million	November 9, 2006	Life simulation	Rare	Microsoft Game Studios
Trials Evolution	1 million	April 18, 2012	Racing	RedLynx	Microsoft Studios

== See also ==
- List of Xbox 360 games (A–L)
- List of Xbox 360 games (M–Z)
