= GOW3 =

GOW3 may refer to:

- God of War III, a 2010 video game for the PlayStation 3.
- Gears of War 3, a 2011 video game for the Xbox 360.
