= 10th Annual Interactive Achievement Awards =

Video game award ceremony

- Date: February 9, 2007
- Venue: Hard Rock Hotel and Casino
- Country: Las Vegas, Nevada, USA
- Hosted by: Jay Mohr

Highlights
- Most awards: Gears of War (8)
- Most nominations: Gears of War (10)
- Overall Game of the Year: Gears of War
- Hall of Fame: Dani Bunten
- Lifetime Achievement: Minoru Arakawa and Howard Lincoln

The 10th Annual Interactive Achievement Awards was the 10th edition of the Interactive Achievement Awards, an annual awards event that honored the best games in the video game industry during 2006. The awards were arranged by the Academy of Interactive Arts & Sciences (AIAS), and were held at the Hard Rock Hotel and Casino in Las Vegas, Nevada on February 9, 2007. It was also held as part of the Academy's 2007 D.I.C.E. Summit, and was hosted by stand-up comedian Jay Mohr.

The original nomination package listed "Cellphone Game of the Year", but the finalists were listed for "Mobile Game of the Year". The nomination package also features a genre category of "Casual Game of the Year", but there were not any finalists named for this category. Instead, finalists were listed for "Downloadable Game of the Year", which was not part of the category listing in the rules & procedures.

Gears of War received the most nominations and won the most awards, including "Overall Game of the Year". Microsoft Game Studios and Nintendo tied for having the most nominations, with Microsoft winning the most awards. Electronic Arts had the most nominated games, and tied with Microsoft and Nintendo for having the most award-winning games. Nintendo EAD was the only developer with more than one award-winning game.

Dani Bunten was inducted posthumously into the Academy of Interactive Arts & Sciences Hall of Fame. Nintendo of America founders Minoru Arakawa and Howard Lincoln also became the first recipients of the "Lifetime Achievement Award".

== Winners and Nominees ==
Winners are listed first, highlighted in boldface, and indicated with a double dagger (‡).

=== Game of the Year awards ===
**Overall Game of the Year**: **Gears of War (Epic Games, Microsoft Game Studios) — Rod Fergusson, Michael Capss, Cliff Bleszinski**‡; Guitar Hero II (Harmonix, RedOctane) — John Tam, Daniel Sussman, Josh Randall; The Elder Scrolls IV: Oblivion (Bethesda Game Studios, 2K Games) — Todd Howard; The Legend of Zelda: Twilight Princess (Nintendo EAD) — Shigeru Miyamoto, Eiji Aonuma, Satoru Iwata; Wii Sports (Nintendo EAD) — Keizo Ohta, Takayuki Shimamura, Katsuya Eguchi, Yoshikazu Yamashita, Satoru Iwata	**Computer Game of the Year**: **The Elder Scrolls IV: Oblivion (Bethesda Game Studios, 2K Games) — Todd Howard**‡; Age of Empires III: The WarChiefs (Ensemble Studios, Microsoft Game Studios) — Wally Wachi, Sandy Petersen; Battlefield 2142 (DICE, Electronic Arts); Company of Heroes (Relic Entertainment, THQ) — John Johnson, Sean Dunn; Prey (Human Head Studios, 2K Games) — Timothy S. Gerrtisen, Ted Halstead, Chris Rhinehart
**Console Game of the Year**: **Gears of War (Epic Games, Microsoft Game Studios) — Rod Fergusson, Michael Capss, Cliff Bleszinski**‡; Guitar Hero II (Harmonix, RedOctane) — John Tam, Daniel Sussman, Josh Randall; The Legend of Zelda: Twilight Princess (Nintendo EAD) — Shigeru Miyamoto, Eiji Aonuma, Satoru Iwata; Viva Piñata (Rare, Microsoft Game Studios) — Gregg Mayles; Wii Sports (Nintendo EAD) — Keizo Ohta, Takayuki Shimamura, Katsuya Eguchi, Yoshikazu Yamashita, Satoru Iwata	**Handheld Game of the Year**: **Brain Age: Train Your Brain in Minutes a Day! (Nintendo SPD) — Shinya Takahashi, Kouichi Kawamoto, Noriko Kitamura, Masamuichi Sakaino, Shinji Kitahara, Yoshinori Katsuki, Tadashi Matsushita, Masaru Nishida**‡; Elite Beat Agents (iNiS, Nintendo) — Shinya Saito, Masako Harada, Keiichi Yano; Lego Star Wars II: The Original Trilogy (Traveller's Tales, LucasArts) — Loz Doyle, Jon Burton, James Cunliffe; LocoRoco (SCE Japan Studio) — Tsutomu Kouno; New Super Mario Bros. (Nintendo EAD) — Hiroyuki Kimura, Shigeyuki Asuke, Massanao Arimoto

=== Outstanding Innovation in Gaming ===
**Outstanding Innovation in Gaming**
- **Wii Sports (Nintendo EAD) — Katsuya Eguchi, Satoru Iwata, Keizo Ohta, Takayuki Shimamura, Yoshikazu Yamashita, Kouichi Kawamoto, Noriko Kitamura, Masamuichi Sakaino, Shinji Kitahara, Yoshinori Katsuki, Tadashi Matsushita, Masaru Nishida**‡
  - Brain Age: Train Your Brain in Minutes a Day! (Nintendo SPD) — Shinya Takahashi, Kouichi Kawamoto, Masaru Nishida
  - Gears of War (Epic Games, Microsoft Game Studios) — Rod Fergusson, Michael Capss, Keizo Ohta, Takayuki Shimamura, Cliff Bleszinski
  - LocoRoco (SCE Japan Studio) — Tsutomu Kouno
  - Viva Piñata (Rare, Microsoft Game Studios) — Gregg Mayles

=== Craft awards ===
**Outstanding Achievement in Game Design**: **Wii Sports (Nintendo EAD) — Keizo Ohta, Takayuki Shimamura, Yoshikazu Yamashita**‡; Brain Age: Train Your Brain in Minutes a Day! (Nintendo SPD) — Kouichi Kawamoto; Company of Heroes (Relic Entertainment, THQ) — Josh Mosqueira, John Johnson, Sean Dunn; The Elder Scrolls IV: Oblivion (Bethesda Game Studios, 2K Games) — Todd Howard; The Legend of Zelda: Twilight Princess (Nintendo EAD) — Eiji Aonuma, Kouichi Kawamoto, Noriko Kitamura, Masamichi Sakaino, Shinji Kitahara, Yoshinori Katsuki, Tadashi Matsushita, Masaru Nishida	**Outstanding Achievement in Story and Character Development**: **The Legend of Zelda: Twilight Princess (Nintendo EAD) — Mitsuhiro Takario, Aya Kyogoku, Yusuke Nakano, Satomi Asakawa, Takahiro Watanabe**‡; 24: The Game (SCE Cambridge Studio, 2K Games) — Duppy Demetrius, Chris Sorrell, Robert Hill, Candice Teo, Paul Gadd; Dreamfall: The Longest Journey (Funcom, Aspyr) — Ragnar Tørnquist, Dag Scheve; Saints Row (Volition, THQ) — Steve Jaros, Tommy Stanton, Douglas Carrigan; Sam & Max Episode 1: Culture Shock (Telltale Games) — Dave Grossman, Brendan Ferguson, Steve Purcell, David Bogan, Julian Kwasneski
**Outstanding Achievement in Animation**: **Gears of War (Epic Games, Microsoft Game Studios) — Aaron Herzog, Jay Hosfelt, Jerry O'Flaherty**‡; Daxter (Ready at Dawn, Sony Computer Entertainment) — Ru Weerasuriya, Jerome de Menou; Fight Night Round 3 (EA Chicago) — Alan Cruz, Andy Konieczny; Lego Star Wars II: The Original Trilogy (Traveller's Tales, LucasArts) — Jeremy Pardon; Rayman Raving Rabbids (Ubisoft Montpellier) — Patrick Bodard	**Outstanding Achievement in Art Direction**: **Gears of War (Epic Games, Microsoft Game Studios) — Jerry O'Flaherty, Chris Perna**‡; Call of Duty 3 (Treyarch, Activision); Final Fantasy XII (Square Enix) — Akihiko Yoshida, Hideo Minaba; Tom Clancy's Rainbow Six: Vegas (Ubisoft Montreal) — Olivier Leonardi, Jeffrey Giles; Viva Piñata (Rare, Microsoft Game Studios)
**Outstanding Achievement in Soundtrack**: **Guitar Hero II (Harmonix, RedOctane) — Eric Brosius**‡; FIFA 07 (EA Canada) — Joe Nickolis; Marc Ecko's Getting Up: Contents Under Pressure (The Collective, Atari) — Marc Ecko, Sean "Diddy" Combs; Scarface: The World Is Yours (Radical Entertainment, Sierra Entertainment) — Rob Bridgett; SingStar Rocks! (SCE London Studio) — Alex Hackford, Sergio Pimentel	**Outstanding Achievement in Original Music Composition**: **LocoRoco (SCE Japan Studio) — Nobuyuki Shimizu, Kemmei Adachi**‡; Black (Criterion Games, Electronic Arts) — Chris Tilton, Michael Giacchino; Call of Duty 3 (Treyarch, Activision) — Joel Goldsmith; The Elder Scrolls IV: Oblivion (Bethesda Game Studios, 2K Games) — Jeremy Soule; Tom Clancy's Splinter Cell: Double Agent (Ubisoft Shanghai) — Michael McCann
**Outstanding Achievement in Sound Design**: **Call of Duty 3 (Treyarch, Activision) — Jerry Berlongieri**‡; Company of Heroes (Relic Entertainment, THQ) — John Tenant, Glen Jamison, Crispin Hands; The Elder Scrolls IV: Oblivion (Bethesda Game Studios, 2K Games) — Mark Lampert; Tom Clancy's Ghost Recon Advanced Warfighter (Red Storm Entertainment, Ubisoft Paris) — Alexandre Carlotti, Emmanuel Gouvemaire; Tom Clancy's Splinter Cell: Double Agent (Ubisoft Shanghai) — Zhang Lei, Roman His	**Outstanding Achievement in Gameplay Engineering**: **Wii Sports (Nintendo EAD) — Emi Tomita, Takako Ishii, Masanobu Sato, Yoshifumi Masaki**‡; Company of Heroes (Relic Entertainment, THQ) — Josh Mosqueira, Paul Mitchell, Shelby Hubick; Gears of War (Epic Games, Microsoft Game Studios) — Cliff Bleszinski, Ray Davis; The Elder Scrolls IV: Oblivion (Bethesda Game Studios, 2K Games) — Todd Howard, Guy Carver, Craig Walton; The Legend of Zelda: Twilight Princess (Nintendo EAD) — Eiji Aonuma, Tokhiko Toyoda, Mei Ide, Kazuaki Morita, Yoshiyuki Oyama
**Outstanding Achievement in Online Gameplay**: **Gears of War (Epic Games, Microsoft Game Studios) — Cliff Bleszinski, Ray Davis**‡; Battlefield 2142 (DICE, Electronic Arts) — Marcus Nileson; Call of Duty 3 (Treyarch, Activision) — David Vonderhaar, Dan Bunting; Chromehounds (FromSoftware, Sega) — Toshifumi Nabeshima, Yusuke Ebata; Tom Clancy's Ghost Recon Advanced Warfighter (Red Storm Entertainment, Ubisoft Paris) — Christian Allen, Clark Gibson	**Outstanding Achievement in Visual Engineering**: **Gears of War (Epic Games, Microsoft Game Studios) — Tim Sweeney, Unreal Engine Team**‡; Call of Duty 3 (Treyarch, Activision) — Mike Anthony, David King; Company of Heroes (Relic Entertainment, THQ) — Drew Dunlop, Ian Thompson; Resistance: Fall of Man (Insomniac Games, Sony Computer Entertainment) — Jonny Garrett; Viva Piñata (Rare, Microsoft Game Studios) — Will Bryan, Al Hastings, Mark Lee, Rob Wyatt, Mike Day, Reddy Sambavaram, John Morgan, Jeff Chan, Sam Christiansan

=== Character Performance Awards ===
**Outstanding Achievement in Character Performance - Male**: **John DiMaggio as Marcus Fenix, Gears of War (Epic Games, Microsoft Game Studios) — Written by Susan O'Connor**‡; Gerry Rosenthal as Jimmy Hopkins, Bully (Rockstar Vancouver) — Written by Dan Houser; Max Casella as Daxter, Daxter (Ready at Dawn, Sony Computer Entertainment) — Written by Dan Arey; Lego Han Solo, (Note: Voice actor not specified; Character listed under the voice actor credit.) Lego Star Wars II: The Original Trilogy (Traveller's Tales, LucasArts) — Written by Jeremy Pardon; Michael Ironside as Sam Fisher, Tom Clancy's Splinter Cell: Double Agent (Ubisoft Shanghai) — Written by Richard Dansky	**Outstanding Achievement in Character Performance - Female**: **Louise Ridgeway as Leafos, Viva Piñata (Rare, Microsoft Game Studios)**‡; Maine Anders as Christy Martin, Bully (Rockstar Vancouver) — Written by Dan Houser; Brenda Strong as Mary Alice Young, Desperate Housewives: The Game (Liquid Entertainment, Buena Vista Games) — Story and dialog by Greg Hillegas, Charley Price, and Scott Sanford Tobis; additional dialog by Vernon Dunmore and Eric Heine; Tia Carrere as Lin, Saints Row (Volition, THQ) — Written by Steve Jaros; Lynda Carter, (Note: Voice the female nords and female orcs.) The Elder Scrolls IV: Oblivion (Bethesda Game Studios, 2K Games) — Written by Ken Rolston

=== Genre awards ===
**Action/Adventure Game of the Year**: **Gears of War (Epic Games, Microsoft Game Studios) — Rod Fergusson, Michael Capss, Cliff Bleszinski**‡; Daxter (Ready at Dawn, Sony Computer Entertainment) — Marc Turndorf, Didier Malenfant, Ru Weerasuriya; Saints Row (Volition, THQ) — Jacques Hennequet, Chris Stockman; The Legend of Zelda: Twilight Princess (Nintendo EAD) — Shigeru Miyamoto, Eiji Aonuma, Satoru Iwata; Tom Clancy's Splinter Cell: Double Agent (Ubisoft Shanghai) — Domitille Doat, Daniel Ray, Arnaud Carette	**Children's Game of the Year**: **LocoRoco (SCE Japan Studio) — Tsutomu Kouno**‡; Kim Possible: What's the Switch (Artificial Mind and Movement, Buena Vista Games) — Shannon Monroe, Nathalie Jasmine, Stephen Jarrett, David Osborne; Over the Hedge (Edge of Reality, Activision) — Steve Rosenthal, Lara Lyn McWilliams, Thomas Coles; Pokémon Mystery Dungeon: Blue Rescue Team and Red Rescue Team (Chunsoft, Nintendo, The Pokémon Company) — Koichi Nakamura, Seiichiro Nagahata; The Legend of Spyro: A New Beginning (Krome Studios, Sierra Entertainment) — Greg Goodrich, John Welsh, Chris Wilson
**First-Person Action Game of the Year**: **Tom Clancy's Rainbow Six: Vegas (Ubisoft Montreal) — Chadi Lebbos, Alexandre Parizeau, Maxime Beland**‡; Black (Criterion Games, Electronic Arts) — Alex Ward; Half-Life 2: Episode One (Valve, Electronic Arts); Resistance: Fall of Man (Insomniac Games, Sony Computer Entertainment); Prey (Human Head Studios, 2K Games) — Timothy S. Gerrtisen, Ted Halstead, Chris Rhinehart	**Fighting Game of the Year**: **Fight Night Round 3 (EA Chicago) — Kudo Tsunoda, Keith Morton, Darren Bennett**‡; Mortal Kombat: Armageddon (Midway Games) — John Padlasek, Ed Boon; Tekken: Dark Resurrection (Eighting, Namco Bandai) — Hajime Nakatani, Haruki Suzaki, Naohiro Hayashi; WWE SmackDown! vs. Raw 2007 (Yuke's, THQ) — Hiromi Furuta, Tokuichi Kitaguchi, Taku Chihaga
**Family Game of the Year**: **Guitar Hero II (Harmonix, RedOctane) — John Tam, Daniel Sussman, Josh Randall**‡; Brain Age: Train Your Brain in Minutes a Day! (Nintendo SPD) — Shinya Takahashi, Kouichi Kawamoto, Satoru Iwata; Lego Star Wars II: The Original Trilogy (Traveller's Tales, LucasArts) — Loz Doyle, Jon Burton, James Cunliffe; Rayman Raving Rabbids (Ubisoft Montpellier) — Pierre-Arnaud Lambert, Jaques Exertier; Viva Piñata (Rare, Microsoft Game Studios) — Gregg Mayles	**Massively Multiplayer Game of the Year**: **Guild Wars Nightfall (ArenaNet, NCSoft) — Jay Adams**‡; Auto Assault (NetDevil, NCSoft) — Steven Snow, Scott Brown; Dungeons & Dragons Online: Stormreach (Turbine, Atari) — Judith Hoffman, Ken Troop; Eve Online: Revelations (CCP Games) — Nathan Richardsson, Huni Hinrichsen, S. Reynir Hardarson
**Racing Game of the Year**: **Burnout Revenge** (Note: Xbox 360 version) **(Criterion Games, Electronic Arts) — Alex Ward**‡; Excite Truck (Monster Games, Nintendo) — Kensuke Tanabe, Keisuke Terasaki, Satoru Iwata, Richard Garcia; Full Auto 2: Battlelines (Pseudo Interactive, Sega) — Michael Gallo, Tim Ernst, Morgan Roberts, Dave Cobb; Need for Speed: Carbon (EA Black Box, EA Canada) — Steve Anthony, Scott Nielsen, Stephane Greford; Test Drive Unlimited (Eden Games, Atari) — Ahmed Boukhelifa, Christophe Laboureau, Stéphane Beley, Frédéric Jay, David Nadal	**Role-Playing Game of the Year**: **The Elder Scrolls IV: Oblivion (Bethesda Game Studios, 2K Games) — Todd Howard**‡; Final Fantasy III (Note: Nintendo DS version) (Square Enix) — Hiromichi Tanaka, Tomoyo Asano; Final Fantasy XII (Square Enix) — Akitoshi Kawazu, Hiroshi Minagawa, Hiroyuki Ito, Akihiko Yoshida; Phantasy Star Universe (Sonic Team, Sega) — Yuji Naka, Takao Miyoshi, Satoshi Sakai; Titan Quest (Iron Lore Entertainment, THQ) — Jeff Godsill, Brian Sullivan
**Sports Game of the Year**: **Tony Hawk's Project 8 (Neversoft, Activision) — Chris Parise, Brian Bright**‡; FIFA 07 (EA Canada) — Joe Booth, Matt Manuel; MLB 06: The Show (SCE San Diego) — Chris Gill, Scott Rhode, Chris Cutliff; NBA 2K7 (Visual Concepts, 2K Games) — David DePaulis, Jeff Thomas, Lynell Junks, Amber Long; NBA 07 (SCE San Diego) — Erich Waas, Rick Campbell, Vernon Mollette, Raja Altenhoff	**Strategy Game of the Year**: **Company of Heroes (Relic Entertainment, THQ) — John Johnson, Sean Dunn**‡; Medieval II: Total War (Creative Assembly, Sega) — Trasant Moorthy, Ken Turner, R.T. Smith; Rise of Nations: Rise of Legends (Big Huge Games, Microsoft Game Studios) — Jason Schklar, Tim Train, Brian Reynolds; Star Wars: Empire at War (Petroglyph Games, LucasArts) — Chuck Kroegel, Chris Williams; The Lord of the Rings: The Battle for Middle-earth II: The Rise of the Witch-king (EA Los Angeles) — Mike Verdu
**Simulation Game of the Year**: **Microsoft Flight Simulator X (Aces Game Studio, Microsoft Game Studios) — Shawn Firminger, John Licata, Patt Cook, Jason Waskey**‡; Sid Meier's Railroads! (Firaxis Games, 2K Games) — Dan Magaha, Sid Meier; Tourist Trophy (Polyphony Digital, Sony Computer Entertainment) — Kazunori Yamauchi, Takamasa Shichisawa	**Downloadable Game of the Year**: **Bookworm Adventures (PopCap Games) — Tysen Henderson**‡; Diner Dash: Flo on the Go (PlayFirst) — Chris Bennett; Mystery Case Files: Prime Suspects (Big Fish Studios) — Patrick Wylie, Adrian Woods, Bill Meyer; Plantasia (Gamelab, PlayFirst) — Erik Zwerling, Kenny Dinkin; Virtual Villagers: A New Home (Last Day of Work, Big Fish Games) — Carla Humphrey
**Mobile Game of the Year**: **Orcs & Elves (id Software, Fountainhead Entertainment, EA Mobile) — John Carmack, Katherine A. Kang**‡; Brothers in Arms 3D (Gameloft); Duckshot (MoFactor, Hands-On Mobile); Tropical Madness (Gameloft) — Jean Nicholas Vernin, Philip Bouchet, Li Kai Jun, Guo Xing

=== Special awards ===
==== Hall of Fame ====
- Dani Bunten

==== Lifetime Achievement ====
- Minoru Arakawa
- Howard Lincoln

=== Multiple nominations and awards ===
==== Multiple Nominations ====
Games that received multiple nominations
Nominations	Game
10	Gears of War
8	The Elder Scrolls IV: Oblivion
6	Company of Heroes
6	The Legend of Zelda: Twilight Princess
6	Viva Piñata
5	Call of Duty 3
5	Wii Sports
4	Brain Age: Train Your Brain in Minutes a Day!
4	Guitar Hero II
4	Lego Star Wars II: The Original Trilogy
4	LocoRoco
4	Tom Clancy's Splinter Cell: Double Agent
3	Daxter
3	Saints Row
2	Battlefield 2142
2	Black
2	Bully
2	FIFA 07
2	Fight Night Round 3
2	Final Fantasy XII
2	Prey
2	Rayman Raving Rabbids
2	Resistance: Fall of Man
2	Tom Clancy's Ghost Recon Advanced Warfighter
2	Tom Clancy's Rainbow Six: Vegas

Nominations by company
Nominations	Games	Company
19	7	Nintendo
19	5	Microsoft Game Studios
14	8	Sony Computer Entertainment
13	9	Electronic Arts
12	4	2K Games
11	4	THQ
10	4	Ubisoft
10	1	Epic Games
8	1	Bethesda Game Studios
7	2	Activision
6	1	Rare
6	1	Relic Entertainment
5	2	LucasArts
5	1	Treyarch
4	4	Sega
4	1	Harmonix
4	1	RedOctane
4	1	Traveller's Tales
3	3	Atari
3	2	Criterion Games
3	2	Square Enix
3	1	Ready at Dawn
3	1	Volition
2	2	Big Fish Games
2	2	Buena Vista Games
2	2	Gameloft
2	2	NCSoft
2	2	PlayFirst
2	1	DICE
2	1	Human Head Studios
2	1	Insomniac Games
2	1	Red Storm Entertainment
2	1	Rockstar Vancouver

==== Multiple awards ====
Games that received multiple awards
Awards	Game
8	Gears of War
3	Wii Sports
2	Guitar Hero II
2	LocoRoco
2	The Elder Scrolls IV: Oblivion

Awards by company
Awards	Games	Company
10	3	Microsoft Game Studios
8	1	Epic Games
5	3	Nintendo
3	3	Electronic Arts
2	2	Activision
2	1	2K Games
2	1	Bethesda Game Studios
2	1	Harmonix
2	1	RedOctane
2	1	Sony Computer Entertainment
