= Gears of War (video game) =

2006 video game

- Developer: Epic Games (Note: Additional development by Psyonix. Ported to Windows by People Can Fly.)
- Publisher: Microsoft Game Studios
- Producer: Rod Fergusson
- Designer: Cliff Bleszinski
- Programmer: Ray Davis
- Artists: Jeremiah O'Flaherty; Chris Perna
- Writers: Susan O'Connor; Eric Nylund
- Composer: Kevin Riepl
- Series: Gears of War
- Engine: Unreal Engine 3
- Platforms: Xbox 360; Windows
- Release: Xbox 360: NA: November 7, 2006; EU: November 17, 2006; AU: November 23, 2006; Windows: NA: November 6, 2007; EU: November 9, 2007; AU: November 15, 2007
- Genre: Third-person shooter
- Modes: Single-player, multiplayer

Gears of War is a 2006 third-person shooter video game developed by Epic Games and published by Microsoft Game Studios. It is the first installment of the Gears of War series, and was initially released as an exclusive title for the Xbox 360 in November 2006. A Microsoft Windows version, developed in conjunction with People Can Fly, was released in November 2007. The game's main story, which can be played in single or co-operative play, focuses on a squad of troops who assist in completing a desperate, last-ditch attempt to end a war against a genocidal subterranean enemy, the Locust, and save the remaining human inhabitants of their planet Sera. The game's multiplayer mode allows up to eight players to control characters from one of the two factions in a variety of online game modes. Gameplay features players using cover and strategic fire in order to win battles.

The game was a commercial success, selling over three million copies within ten weeks of its launch. It became the fastest selling video game of 2006, the second-most played game over Xbox Live during 2007, and one of the best-selling Xbox 360 games. The game received acclaim for its gameplay and visuals, and is considered to be one of the greatest video games ever made, winning over 30 "Game of the Year" awards in 2006 and helped popularize the use of a cover system. A remastered version, Gears of War: Ultimate Edition, was developed primarily by The Coalition. Ultimate Edition was released for the Xbox One in August 2015, and for Microsoft Windows in March 2016. An updated remaster, Gears of War: Reloaded, was co-developed by The Coalition, Sumo Digital and Disbelief, and was released in August 2025 for PlayStation 5, Windows and Xbox Series X/S, notably marking the original game's debut on Steam, and the series' first release on non-Xbox consoles.

Gears of War's success led to the development of a franchise including many sequels, starting with Gears of War 2 in 2008. In addition, it has also spawned adaptations for books and comics, and a film based on the series is currently in development.

== Gameplay ==
Gears of War is a third-person shooter that places emphasis on using cover to avoid taking damage while moving towards enemy forces. The game uses a number of weapons, but predominately featured is the Lancer Assault Rifle, which has a mounted chainsaw bayonet that can deal melee damage at close range. Playable characters can carry two primary weapons, grenades, and a smaller, secondary weapon such as the Snub Pistol. Weapons are reloaded with a tap of the RB button, and a second tap within a given time (active reload) rewards the player with a damage bonus. However, failing to perform the "Active Reload" correctly will cause the gun to become momentarily jammed while the player's character fixes it. When the player takes damage, the "Crimson Omen", a red cog representing the player's health gauge, will fade into the screen, becoming more defined with larger amounts of damage. The player or bots can seek cover to recover their health, but if they take too much damage, they will become incapacitated. Once this occurs, a skull will fill the center void of the omen. The player or bots can then be revived by a teammate, executed by an enemy, or remain incapacitated until they "bleed out", dying from blood loss.

The game features a five-act campaign that can be played alone or cooperatively with another player. The campaign focuses on COG Army soldiers Marcus Fenix and Dominic Santiago and their efforts in the Delta Squad to wipe out the Locust forces on their planet Sera. The player is joined by AI teammates that will help fight the Locust. Certain sections of the campaign feature two paths that can be taken as selected by the first player. If there is a second player, their character will automatically take the other. The campaign can be played at three difficulty settings in the first game. From easiest to hardest, these are "Casual", "Hardcore" and "Insane". The "Insane" difficulty is unlocked once the game is beaten on either the "Casual" or "Hardcore" difficulty.

Multiplayer Gears of War features up to four-on-four competitive gameplay, with teams representing the Gears or the Locust. Players must execute downed foes, otherwise these will revive after a time. In Assassination matches, the team's leader is the only one that can track the other team's leader and pick up new weapons, after which teammates can pick them up, with the goal to eliminate the foe's leader. An Xbox 360 patch added the "Annex" mode, which is similar to King of the Hill, in which players must try to control a shifting control point for a certain amount of time to win. The PC version of Gears introduced "King of the Hill", a mode not present in the Xbox 360 version, which uses a fixed control point but varies the conditions on which it is controlled.

== Synopsis ==
=== Setting and characters ===
Gears of War takes place on Sera, an Earth-like planet where conflicting scientific and religious philosophies fueled a massive energy crisis. The discovery of Imulsion, a potent liquid fuel found in underground caverns called "The Hollow", led to a world-wide conflict between the Coalition of Ordered Governments (COG) and Union of Independent Republics (UIR). After the 79-year Pendulum Wars, humanity faced a new threat on "Emergence Day" (E-Day), when the Locust Horde emerged from the Hollow to initiate a genocidal invasion. Overwhelmed, the COG utilized the "Hammer of Dawn," a satellite-based weapon system developed during the previous war, to destroy their own occupied cities. The survivors were then evacuated to the Jacinto Plateau, the only region the Locust could not invade from underground.

The game's campaign primarily focuses on Marcus Fenix (John DiMaggio), a soldier who was imprisoned ten years after E-Day for conducting an unauthorized rescue operation, and his comrades in Delta Squad: Dominic "Dom" Santiago (Carlos Ferro), a close friend and teammate; Augustus Cole (Lester Speight), a former sports star; and Damon Baird (Fred Tatasciore), a skilled technician and former officer. Other characters include Colonel Victor Hoffman, the COG's main military officer; Private Anthony Carmine, a recent recruit for Delta; Lieutenant Minh Young Kim, a veteran officer, and Delta's squad leader; and Lieutenant Anya Stroud, a COG intelligence officer. The game's main antagonist is General RAAM, a powerful leader of the Locust Horde's armed forces.

Players take control of Fenix in the campaign; in co-op mode, the second player controls Santiago. All four Delta squad members are available for play during multiplayer games, along with Carmine, Kim, and Hoffman, in addition to various Locust characters.

=== Plot ===
The game's plot begins 14 years after Emergence Day (E-Day), when the Locust Horde overran and killed many COG soldiers and civilians, declaring war against humanity. Marcus Fenix, a former COG soldier, is reinstated into the military after spending four years in prison for deserting his military post in order to make a vain attempt to save his father, Adam Fenix. Dominic "Dom" Santiago, Marcus' best friend and fellow COG, successfully extracts Fenix from the prison, and takes him to meet Delta Squad. The group seeks to obtain the "resonator", a device that will map "The Hollow", the caverns which the Locust inhabit and later deploy the "Lightmass Bomb", which will destroy the heart of the Locust forces inside the Hollow. Fenix and his allies recover the device, but suffer multiple casualties in the process including Anthony Carmine and Squad leader Kim. Fleeing RAAM's forces, Fenix leads the remaining soldiers through the ruins of Ephyra to claim a "Junker" APC, drive to a mining facility, and finally into the planet's depths.

Delta Squad successfully detonates the resonator, but the device fails to map enough of the tunnel network. They discover a larger map of the network that originates from Fenix's old home, specifically his father's laboratory. The group ventures to the Fenix estate at East Barricade Academy, where Fenix originally attempted to rescue his father. When they arrive, Delta encounters heavy Locust resistance. After collecting the data, the group fights their way past Locust forces and boards a train carrying the Lightmass Bomb. Fenix and Santiago battle their way through the train, and are able to kill General RAAM, before uploading the data. Fully activated, the Lightmass Bomb launches into the Hollow, and eradicates the Locust tunnel networks. In the game's final sequence, Hoffman delivers a victory speech as the tunnels collapse and explode, whereupon the voice of the Locust Queen promises that the Locust will continue to fight onward, despite their losses.

== Development ==
=== Design ===
The first concept for the game was conceived around the years 2000 and 2001 as Unreal Warfare, which was much closer to the multiplayer-driven Unreal series than the game that would eventually become Gears of War. The original concept for the game featured character classes and mechs, being played in a closed arena against other players or bots. The game was put on standby as Epic focused on the Unreal Tournament series, and when the team went back to it, the industry had shifted towards single-player games and the aim of the game was changed.

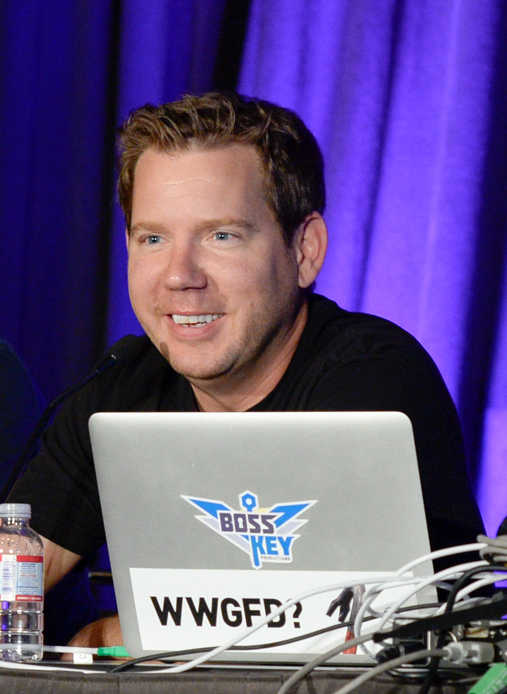
Cliff Bleszinski served as the lead designer on Gears of War.

According to Rod Fergusson, the game was at one point intended to be a horror game influenced by Band of Brothers, Resident Evil 4 and Kill Switch. A romance subplot was considered for the game but was eventually dropped. In an interview with Cliff Bleszinski, lead developer for Epic Games, he cites three games that were the primary influences in the game's design, including the pacing and over-the-shoulder third-person perspective from Resident Evil 4 and the tactical-cover system from Kill Switch; Bleszinski also cited Bionic Commando's influence on the cover system, equating the actions of moving from cover to cover as similar to the action of swinging from platform to platform in the latter game. These design choices reflect themselves in the gameplay, as Gears of War focuses mainly on squad team-based and cover-dependent tactics with limited weapons rather than brute force. Bleszinski also cited the influence of The Legend of Zelda, including its storytelling and world-building elements, acquiring and mastering of tools, and underground environments. The game's title itself is a homage to Metal Gear, an early formative influence on Bleszinski. The total cost of development was $10 million, according to Epic's Mark Rein, and 20 to 30 people were involved with the development at any time. However, these figures do not include the proprietary Unreal Engine 3.

Gears of War was first shown as an unnamed exclusive for the Xbox 360 in a behind-closed-doors presentation by Epic Games at the 2005 Game Developers Conference. The demo was presented as a technology showcase for Unreal Engine 3 that would run on the Xenon processor at the center of the new Xbox. It showcased a group of human soldiers patrolling a city at night that fell under ambush. The demo was noted for its overall realism, suspense, and visual clarity, helping to reinforce the argument advanced by Epic Games' founder Tim Sweeney for Microsoft to double the memory in the Xbox 360 from the planned 256 MB to 512 MB. This decision that would ultimately cost Microsoft tens of millions of dollars and restrict the number of Xbox 360 consoles available at launch, but allowed Gears of War and many other Xbox 360 games to run at 720p resolution.

Gears of War lead designer Cliff Bleszinski said he hoped for the game to expand into graphic novels and eventually film. On November 21, 2006, Microsoft Corporate VP of Global Marketing and Interactive Entertainment Business Jeff Bell stated Gears of War is the first in a trilogy, through sequences on E-Day and the battle of Jacinto Plateau, as well as information on Adam Fenix and his research. Epic Games Vice President Mark Rein posted a message on the official Gears of War Internet forums, stating "It's not over until it is not fun anymore", and, in his view, Gears of War may become the next Halo series in terms of popularity.

The ending to Gears of War heavily suggested a sequel, and at the 2007 Game Developers Conference, Bleszinkski confirmed that Epic Games did "intend to do a sequel" to Gears of War. The game's sequel, Gears of War 2 was officially confirmed on February 20, 2008, and was released at midnight on November 7, 2008. On January 27, 2014, Microsoft announced that they have acquired all rights to the franchise from Epic Games and that Rod Fergusson had rejoined Microsoft Studios to lead development on future Gears of War games.

=== Windows version ===
News of the franchise's future has emerged multiple times since the game's release. PC Gamer accidentally released an image in its 2006 holiday issue where Gears of War can be seen in a Games for Windows display, which led to suspicion that Gears of War would be released for the PC; however, the image was later stated to be a mock-up. Possible leaked pictures were released on February 13, 2007, leading to more suspicion of Gears on the PC. In an interview with Xbox fan site TeamXbox, Mark Rein stated that the game would eventually come to the PC; Epic was not currently ready to release it on that format, but the upcoming release of Unreal Tournament 3 was "helping (Epic) get optimization on the PC".

On July 11, 2007, at the E3 conference, it was revealed that Gears of War would indeed be released for Windows. New features include three new multi-player maps, an extension of five new single-player chapters to act five which describes events of Delta Squad escaping a giant Brumak between acts four and five (which Mark Rein claims is "about 20 percent extra" over the existing Xbox 360 content), new game modes, a game editor, and Games for Windows – Live support integrated into Unreal Engine 3. When asked about bringing the additional content to the Xbox 360 version, Mark Rein of Epic Games stated that "it is unlikely we will bring that content to 360". He then states, "Unfortunately the version it's built on is not really compatible with the 360 and so it would involve a massive patch, a patch larger than all five we've done so far, to Gears of War to do that." Additionally, the PC and Xbox 360 versions will not allow for cross-platform play; Cliff Bleszinski stated that "while this feature does add value, it just wasn't that desired nor worth the extra months of design and development time. We want Gears of War to be out this holiday on PC." This news angered many owners of Gears of War on the Xbox 360 due to the game no longer living up to its "Exclusively for the Xbox 360" title and not receiving the additional content. Mark Rein noted that despite their original label of the game as an Xbox 360 exclusive, Microsoft allowed them to develop the game as part of the Games for Windows moniker, as has been done previously with Halo 2.

A patch was released on November 28 to fix performance issues and also the Games for Windows – Live update issue. The patch was only released for American and Western European versions of the game; legitimate purchasers of the Eastern European and Russian versions were informed that "the game would continue to function without the patch" and never issued a corresponding version.

A macOS version was confirmed by Mark Rein at the end of E3, on the Game Head television program on July 14, 2007, along with Unreal Tournament 3, but no release time frame was specified. As of August 2014, nothing more has been mentioned.

In early 2009, an issue with a digital certificate, used to sign certain game-critical files as part of the anti-cheat mechanism, which expired on January 28, 2009, rendered the game unplayable without a temporary workaround of resetting the system clock to before the certificate expired. Initial information from sources led people to believe the issue was related to DRM within the game. Epic later acknowledged the problem, claiming it was not in relation to a form of DRM but instead to a form of anti-cheat, and notified end users that they "[were] working with Microsoft to get it resolved." This issue was corrected as of February 6, 2009 with a downloadable patch.

=== Music ===
The music was composed by Kevin Riepl who has previously worked with Epic Games on the soundtracks for Unreal Tournament 2004 and Unreal Championship 2: The Liandri Conflict. Riepl began receiving early builds and cinematics about halfway through the development process, closely collaborating with the development team on the influence the music should have on the player and the story. The theme of 'Destroyed Beauty' that had inspired the game's visuals guided the music too, creating mood suited to a beautiful city in ruins and the emotional desperation of its inhabitants.

The score includes many mechanical percussive elements, altered samples of explosions, hits and impacts, and electric guitar stingers that punctuate the game's combat encounters. To complete the score these elements were combined with the organic sounds of a live orchestra. The orchestral score was orchestrated and conducted by Corey Status and performed by the Northwest Sinfonia orchestra. The title track was written and performed by thrash metal band Megadeth, with an instrumental version of the song being used for the soundtrack; a revised version with lyrics was featured on the band's 2007 album United Abominations. Megadeth performed the track live as headliners of Gigantour, a twenty-five stop metal tour sponsored by Microsoft as part of the promotion for the game.

A soundtrack was released on July 31, 2007, by Sumthing Else Music Works.

== Marketing and release ==
=== Promotional videos ===
Microsoft produced a thirty-minute documentary, titled Gears of War: The Race to E3, that aired on MTV2 on May 19, 2006, to promote the game. The program was produced in a reality TV style and featured Cliff Bleszinski, Epic Games president Mike Capps, and producer Rod Fergusson in the weeks leading up to the Gears of War gameplay reveal at the Xbox Media Briefing at E3 2006. The program captures several stressful moments including Xbox executive Peter Moore's desire to remove the chainsaw rifle from the E3 demo days before the show. The chainsaw remained and after the demo was given Bill Gates confided to Cliff "I love that chainsaw."

The "Mad World" spot used the game's textures and models, demonstrating the fidelity of the game's graphics.

The Gears of War television ad reveals Marcus Fenix alone in the ruined streets of Sera as he moves to avoid threats that appear throughout a dark and deserted city. The spot was widely praised and has been described as one of the most iconic game trailers of the 2000s. The spot, set to the Gary Jules' cover of "Mad World" and directed by Joseph Kosinski, is melancholic and reflective in tone and was a significant departure for videogame advertising at the time, especially a fast-paced shooter game. According to Kosinski, David Fincher was slated to direct the ad but had to drop out from a scheduling conflict, leading to Kosinski being brought on to direct. Visual effects company Digital Domain created the visuals inside the Unreal Engine 3 game engine, the same engine that powered Gears of War on the Xbox 360. While the spot was pre-rendered, the production method gave consumers an accurate preview of the game's textures and subtle facial expressions.

The popularity of the commercial built a bigger audience for "Mad World" which would reach the #1 spot on iTunes five years after it was initially recorded. The melody remains heavily associated with the Gears of War franchise and was later adopted into the soundtrack of Gears of War 3. Bleszinski said in 2015 that he chose the song as it was his "anthem" at the time to cope with the failure of his first marriage.

=== Limited Collector's Edition ===
At the game's release, Epic Games released a "Limited Collectors Edition". Some of the notable differences are a steel case instead of the regular plastic case and an extra disc which contains artworks of environments and stages including Locust that did not made it to the game, and extra content and behind-the-scenes footage of the making of Gears of War. The disc also contains a time-lapse on the creation of the "Emergence" mural. The game's disc and case has a different cover and instead features the Omen background. Another of the Limited Collector's Edition extras is a book titled Destroyed Beauty which illustrates the game's back-story and includes concepts, sketches, and descriptions of the game's characters. The Limited Collector's Edition also includes the same instruction manual and 48-hour Xbox Live Gold trial as the regular game does.

=== Downloadable content and updates ===
Epic Games began working on new content for Gears of War in August 2006. The updates would remain free according to Epic Games president Mike Capps. The first of these updates was released over Xbox Live on January 9, 2007, with two new maps released the following day on January 10, 2007. The two maps, "Raven Down" and "Old Bones", reflected background scenes from the game's storyline which depict Gears fighting Locust amidst the crash site of a King Raven chopper and a museum. Another update was released for Gears of War on January 22, 2007, which, according to Epic Games' Marc Rein, is said to fix some compatibility issues with the release of Gears of War in Japan, and that no game play or functionality features were changed.

On April 9, 2007, Epic Games released their third update, containing a new game mode titled "Annex", which requires teams to capture and hold certain areas of each map, as well as additional gameplay tweaks and fixing up some glitches, bugs and exploits. The update was free of charge.

Epic Games initially said that four new maps would be released in conjunction with the third patch. However, due to disagreements between Microsoft and Epic Games, Epic decided instead to "put these maps on sale at a reasonable price then make them free a few months later," according to Mark Rein of Epic Games. The map pack, titled Hidden Fronts, was released on Xbox Live Marketplace on May 3, 2007, and included the maps Bullet Marsh, "Garden", "Process", and "Subway". Free downloads of these maps were made available on September 3, 2007, four months after their initial release.

A fourth update on June 14, 2007, added 250 additional Achievement points (bringing the total possible achievement points to 1250), in eight Achievements related to Annex mode and the maps from Hidden Fronts. Additionally, the update includes improvement of roadie run to keep the player from sticking to cover areas, and a patch to prevent the Annex clock from counting during connection errors. Other "housekeeping" issues were also addressed.

=== Ultimate Edition ===
During a press conference at E3 2015, Microsoft announced a remaster of Gears of War entitled Gears of War: Ultimate Edition. It brought about a number of improvements, including updates to the gameplay from later titles and enhanced graphics featuring remodeled characters, environmental assets and other stylistic changes. It was subsequently released worldwide for the Xbox One in North America and Asian-Pacific countries on August 25, 2015, and in Europe on August 28, and Microsoft Windows on March 1, 2016.

=== Reloaded ===
Gears of War: Reloaded, co-developed by The Coalition, Sumo Digital and Disbelief, was announced in May 2025 and was released on August 26, 2025, for Xbox Series X/S, Windows via Microsoft Store and Steam, and PlayStation 5, marking the first time the Gears of War franchise has been made available on non-Xbox consoles. It is an updated port based on Ultimate Edition, with an enhanced presentation at 4K resolution and 60 frames-per-second for the campaign, and 120FPS for multiplayer. Reloaded also supports High Dynamic Range (HDR) and Variable Refresh Rate (VRR) displays, as well as spatial audio technology. The port also collects all previously released post-launch downloadable content (DLC) from Ultimate Edition, including the bonus campaign, multiplayer maps and player cosmetics. Players using a Microsoft Account will also unlock full cross progression for the campaign and multiplayer components across all platforms, as well as cross-platform invites for multiplayer and the co-op campaign. Gears of War: Reloaded will offer a free upgrade path for all players who purchased Ultimate Edition digitally on Xbox and Windows prior to the game's announcement.

== Reception ==
=== Critical reception ===
Reception

Aggregate scores
Aggregator	Score
GameRankings	(360) 94% (PC) 87%
Metacritic	(360) 94/100 (PC) 87/100

Review scores
Publication	Score
1Up.com	(360) A+ (PC) B−
AllGame	(360) 4.5/5
Eurogamer	(360) 8/10 (PC) 9/10
Game Informer	(360) 9.5/10
GamePro	(360) 4.75/5
GameSpot	(360) 9.6/10 (PC) 9.0/10
GameSpy	(360) 5/5 (PC) 4.5/5
GamesRadar+	(360) 10/10
GameTrailers	(360) 9.1/10 (PC) 8.8/10
IGN	(360) 9.4/10 (PC) 8.7/10
Official Xbox Magazine (US)	(360) 10/10

Upon its release, Gears of War received praise from critics, maintaining an average review score of 93.97% at GameRankings and 94/100 at Metacritic. It was the second highest rated game of 2006 on both sites. Most reviewers praised the game for its concept visuals, presentation and sound. IGN's review of the game called it "the most gorgeous looking game on the Xbox 360" and that "the sound design is worthy of awards."

While the game received high praise, reviewers did point out that Gears of War did not offer anything significantly new in its core gameplay. Eurogamer's review of the game states: "let's not pretend that we're wallowing in the future of entertainment. What we have here is an extremely competent action game that's as polished and refined as it could be, and is therefore very enjoyable. But if Epic had applied the same widescreen scope and ambition to the gameplay as it did to the engine we'd be much more excited than we are." The game's story was noted for not being very deep, as GameSpot's review states "The lack of exposition feels like a missed opportunity to make the characters and the setting even more compelling."

The PC release of the game received similar praise as the 360 version, with reviewers noting various differences between the two versions. IGN commented that "The mouse and keyboard allow for more precise control, and the graphics have been improved as well;" however, 1UP stated that "the control scheme's a very central obstacle" to the game. GameSpot noted that the additional chapter felt out of place as "it changes things up a bit in ways that betray the difficulty progression of the game." Hyper's Cam Shea commends the game for its "visual, solid gameplay, killer multiplayer and reload mechanics". However, he criticised it for "potential frustration, pointless squad commands and chainsaw mechanics".

The Lancer weapon was later featured in an Electronic Gaming Monthly article that discusses its practicality and historical precedents. Keirsey criticized this weapon by noting that in real life, "chainsaws are heavy." He noted that the closest historical precedents are "medieval bludgeoning weapons".

=== Sales ===
Gears of War was a hit upon its release. On November 7, 2006—the day that it was released—it became the most popular game on the Xbox Live service, until the release of Halo 3, overtaking Halo 2 which had held the spot since its launch in November 2004. Gears was the second most-played game on the Xbox Live service throughout 2007. Gears of War sold one million copies in its first two weeks on sale making it the fastest-selling Xbox 360 game to date. By January 19, 2007, just ten weeks after its debut, over three million units of the game had been sold. It received a "Double Platinum" sales award from the Entertainment and Leisure Software Publishers Association (ELSPA), indicating sales of at least 600,000 copies in the United Kingdom. As of November 7, 2008, the game has sold 5.88 million copies worldwide. Gears of War was also the first Xbox or Xbox 360 game to sell out and reach the top ten charts in Japan.

=== Awards ===
Leading up to the game's release, Gears of War was one of the most anticipated games of 2006. The game premiered during the 2005 E3 show, and won, among others, several "Best 360 Game" awards, including from IGN, 1UP, and GameSpy. The game continued to win several awards at following 2006 E3 show prior to the game's release. These included the Game Critics Awards for "Best Console Game" and "Best Action Game", IGN's "Best 360 Action Game", "Best 360 Multiplayer Game", and "Best Overall Multiplayer Experience", and GameSpy's "Best Console Multiplayer", "Best Action Game", and "Xbox 360 Game of Show".

Upon release, Gears of War received numerous awards from many publications. IGN named Gears of War as the "Xbox 360 Game of the Year" among other awards. GameSpot named the game its "Game of the Year" as well as "Best Xbox 360 Game", among other accolades. Official Xbox Magazine named Gears of War as their "Xbox 360 Game of the Year". G4 TV during the 2007 G-Phoria awards, named Gears of War its "Game of the Year" in addition to other awards. Writing for Entertainment Weekly, Geoff Keighley and Gary Eng Walk named Gears of War their "Best Video Game of 2006".

Gears of War won eight awards (out of ten nominations) at the 10th Annual Interactive Achievement Awards: "Overall Game of the Year", "Console Game of the Year", "Action/Adventure Game of the Year", and outstanding achievement in "Animation", "Art Direction", "Visual Engineering", "Online Gameplay", and "Character Performance - Male" (John DiMaggio as Marcus Fenix). The game received the awards of "Ultimate Game of the Year" and "Xbox Game of the Year" at the 2007 Golden Joystick Awards.

In addition, the characters within the game received additional awards. GameSpot gave their 2006 "Best New Character(s)" award to the Delta Squad of Gears of War. G4 TV named Marcus Fenix the "Best New Character" and gave Lester Speight's performance for "Augustus 'Cole Train' Cole" the award for "Best Voiceover". The game was given the Interactive Achievement Award for "Outstanding Character Performance – Male" for its voicework. The Berserkers were named as Official Xbox Magazine's "Enemy of the Year".

Guinness World Records awarded Gears of War with 5 world records in the Guinness World Records: Gamer's Edition 2008. These records include, "First Console Game to Use the Unreal 3 Engine", "Fastest Selling Original Xbox 360 Game", and "First Music Single to Top the Chart After Promoting a Video Game" for the Gary Jules version of "Mad World", which was originally released in 2003, but topped the download charts in November 2006 after it was used as background music during the TV commercial for Gears of War.

== Film adaptation ==
In March 2007, New Line Cinema bought the rights to make a film adaptation, with Stuart Beattie writing the script along with Marty Bowen and Wyck Godfrey. In June 2008, Len Wiseman was confirmed to direct before dropping out in 2010.

On April 29, 2013, Scott Stuber signed on to produce the film adaptation, unrelated to the previous New Line Cinema project. On October 5, 2016, The Coalition, the franchise's current developer, announced that the film rights shifted to Universal Studios thanks to Stuber's first-look deal. In 2017, Shane Salerno was hired to write a new draft of the screenplay. In 2018, F. Scott Frazier was hired to rewrite Salerno's screenplay.

Production stalled, and in 2022, it was reported that Stuber had purchased the rights for Netflix, where he was newly hired as head-of-film. In March 2023, Jon Spaihts signed on to write the screenplay for the film. In November 2023, it was reported that Spaihts had completed a long-treatment for the screenplay. In May 2025, David Leitch was hired to direct and produce with Kelly McCormick.

== Sequel ==
A sequel, Gears of War 2, was released in November 2008 for the Xbox 360.
