= G-Phoria =

American video game awards show

Logo

Logo

G-Phoria is a former annual video game awards show started in 2003 and ended in 2009, produced by and for the defunct G4 network.

Formerly the event was formatted like a regular awards ceremony taped in front of an audience, featuring celebrities such as Hal Sparks, Carmen Electra, Wilmer Valderrama and Anna Nicole Smith, and musical performances, along with a red carpet preview show, and some game premieres. In 2006, the control of the show was given over to X-Play, which made it a pure viewer's choice show hosted by Adam Sessler and Morgan Webb. After 2009 G-Phoria's honors were effectively blended into the traditional "year in review" show aired by X-Play in mid-December of each year until the show's end in 2012.

== Winners ==
=== 2003 ===
- Best Adaptation: The Lord of the Rings: The Two Towers
- Best Brawl: Mortal Kombat: Deadly Alliance
- Best Cinematic: Warcraft III: Reign of Chaos
- Best Graphics: Tom Clancy's Splinter Cell
- Best Handheld/Mobile game: The Legend of Zelda: A Link to the Past/Four Swords
- Best Live Action/Voice Male Performance: Ray Liotta, Grand Theft Auto: Vice City
- Best Live Action/Voice Female Performance: Jenna Jameson, Grand Theft Auto: Vice City
- Best Online Game: Battlefield 1942
- Best Revival: The Legend of Zelda: The Wind Waker
- Best Rookie: Tom Clancy's Splinter Cell
- Best Soundtrack: Grand Theft Auto: Vice City
- Best Sports Game: Madden NFL 2003
- Best Story: Kingdom Hearts
- Best Villain: Ganon, The Legend of Zelda: The Wind Waker
- Best Weapon: Light Saber, Star Wars Jedi Knight II: Jedi Outcast
- Character You'd Most Like To Be: Dante, Devil May Cry 2
- Coolest Cheat/Easter Egg: Unlock original game, Panzer Dragoon Orta
- EB Gamers Choice Award: Grand Theft Auto: Vice City
- Game of the Year: Grand Theft Auto: Vice City
- Guiltiest Pleasure: Dead or Alive Xtreme Beach Volleyball
- Hottest Character: Tina Armstrong, Dead or Alive Xtreme Beach Volleyball
- Most Annoying Character: Zill, The Legend of Zelda: The Wind Waker
- Most Innovative Game: Animal Crossing
- Most Underrated Game: Super Mario Sunshine

=== 2004 ===
- Alt Sports Award Powered by Mountain Dew: Tony Hawk's Underground
- Best Adaptation: Star Wars: Knights of the Old Republic
- Best Cinematic: Final Fantasy X-2
- Best Easter Egg: Snoop Dogg Cheat, True Crime: Streets of LA
- Best Graphics: Ninja Gaiden
- Best Handheld Game: Final Fantasy Tactics Advance
- Best Innovation: Tom Clancy's Splinter Cell: Pandora Tomorrow, multi-player mode
- Best Mobile Phone Game: Bejeweled multiplayer
- Best Multiplayer Game: Unreal Tournament 2004
- Best New Franchise: Call of Duty
- Best Racing Game: Need for Speed Underground
- Best RPG: Star Wars: Knights of the Old Republic
- Best Sound Design: The Lord of the Rings: The Return of the King
- Best Soundtrack: Tony Hawk's Underground
- Best Traditional Sports Game: Madden NFL 2004
- Best Voice Female Performance: Jada Pinkett Smith, Enter the Matrix
- Best Voice Male Performance: Pierce Brosnan, James Bond 007: Everything or Nothing
- Favorite Character: Ryu Hayabusa, Ninja Gaiden
- Game of the Year: Star Wars: Knights of the Old Republic
- Hottest Character: Rikku, Final Fantasy X-2
- EB Gamers Choice: Star Wars: Knights of the Old Republic

=== 2005 ===
- Alt Sports Award Fueled by Mountain Dew: NBA Street V3
- Best Adaptation: LEGO Star Wars: The Video Game
- Best Action Game: God of War
- Best Boss: Scarab Battle, Halo 2
- Best Cinematic: God of War
- Best Graphics: Half-Life 2
- Best Handheld Game: The Legend of Zelda: The Minish Cap
- Best Innovation: Katamari Damacy
- Best Licensed Soundtrack: Grand Theft Auto: San Andreas
- Best Multiplayer Game: Halo 2
- Best Original Game: God of War
- Best Original Soundtrack: Halo 2
- Best Racing Game: Burnout 3: Takedown
- Best RPG: Star Wars Knights of the Old Republic II: The Sith Lords
- Best Shooter: Halo 2
- Best Sound Design: Halo 2
- Best Traditional Sports Game: Madden NFL 2005
- Best Voice Female Performance: Merle Dandridge, Half-Life 2
- Best Voice Male Performance: David Cross, Halo 2
- EB Gamers Choice Award: World of Warcraft
- Favorite Character: Kratos, God of War
- Game of the Year: Halo 2
- Legend Award Presented by Jeep: Ralph H. Baer

=== 2006 ===
- Best Action Game: Shadow of the Colossus
- Best Voice Acting: Kingdom Hearts II
- Best Shooter: Call of Duty 2
- Best Alt Sports Game: Mario Superstar Baseball
- Best Handheld Game: Mario Kart DS
- Best Original Game: Guitar Hero
- Best Soundtrack: Kingdom Hearts II
- Best Strategy: Star Wars: Empire at War
- Best RPG: The Elder Scrolls IV: Oblivion
- Best Multiplayer: Ghost Recon: Advanced Warfighter
- Best Looking Game: The Elder Scrolls IV: Oblivion
- Best Traditional Sports Game: Fight Night Round 3
- Game of the Year: The Elder Scrolls IV: Oblivion

=== 2007 ===
- Best System: Xbox 360
- Best New Character: Marcus Fenix, Gears of War
- Best Hottest Babe: Kasumi, Dead or Alive Xtreme 2
- Best Strategy: Command & Conquer 3: Tiberium Wars
- Best Sports: Wii Sports
- Best Action: Gears of War
- Best RPG: The Legend of Zelda: Twilight Princess
- Best Most Original: Dead Rising
- Best Multiplayer: Gears of War
- Best Downloadable Content: The Elder Scrolls IV: Shivering Isles
- Best Handheld: Pokémon Diamond and Pearl
- Best Voiceover: The Mighty Rasta as Augustus Cole, Gears of War
- Best Graphics: Gears of War
- Best Soundtrack: Guitar Hero 2
- Best Deserves Uwe Boll Movie: Red Steel
- Best Stride Longest Lasting Game: The Legend of Zelda: Twilight Princess
- Game of the Year: Gears of War

=== 2008 ===
- Game of the Year: Halo 3
- Favorite System: Xbox 360
- Best Graphics: Metal Gear Solid 4: Guns of the Patriots
- Best New Character: Niko Bellic, Grand Theft Auto IV
- Best Party Game: Rock Band
- Best Strategy Game: Sid Meier's Civilization Revolution
- Best Sports Game: skate.
- Best Action Game: Grand Theft Auto IV
- Best Shooter: Call of Duty 4: Modern Warfare
- Best Racing Game: Mario Kart Wii
- Best RPG Game: Mass Effect
- Most Original: Portal
- Best Online Player Game: Call of Duty 4: Modern Warfare
- Best Downloadable Content: Rock Band
- Best Handheld Game: God of War: Chains of Olympus
- Best Voice Acting: Metal Gear Solid 4: Guns of the Patriots
- Best Soundtrack: Rock Band
- Game Most Deserving of an Uwe Boll Movie: Turok
- Longest Lasting Game Presented By Stride: Grand Theft Auto IV

=== 2009 ===
- Best Action Game: Infamous
- Best Downloadable Content: Fallout 3: Broken Steel
- Best Downloadable Game: Castle Crashers
- Best Graphics: Killzone 2
- Best Handheld Game: Grand Theft Auto: Chinatown Wars
- Best New Character: Sackboy, LittleBigPlanet
- Best Online Multiplayer: Left 4 Dead
- Best Party Game: Rock Band 2
- Best Racing Game: Burnout Paradise: Big Surf Island
- Best Role-Playing Game: Fallout 3
- Best Shooter: Gears of War 2
- Best Soundtrack: Fallout 3
- Best Sports Game: Fight Night Round 4
- Best Strategy Game: Halo Wars
- Best Voice Acting: Fallout 3
- Deserves an Uwe Boll Movie: Legendary
- Favorite System: Xbox 360
- Game of the Year: Fallout 3
- Most Original Game: LittleBigPlanet
- Longest Lasting Game: Fallout 3
