= Mike Capps (executive) =

American video game designer

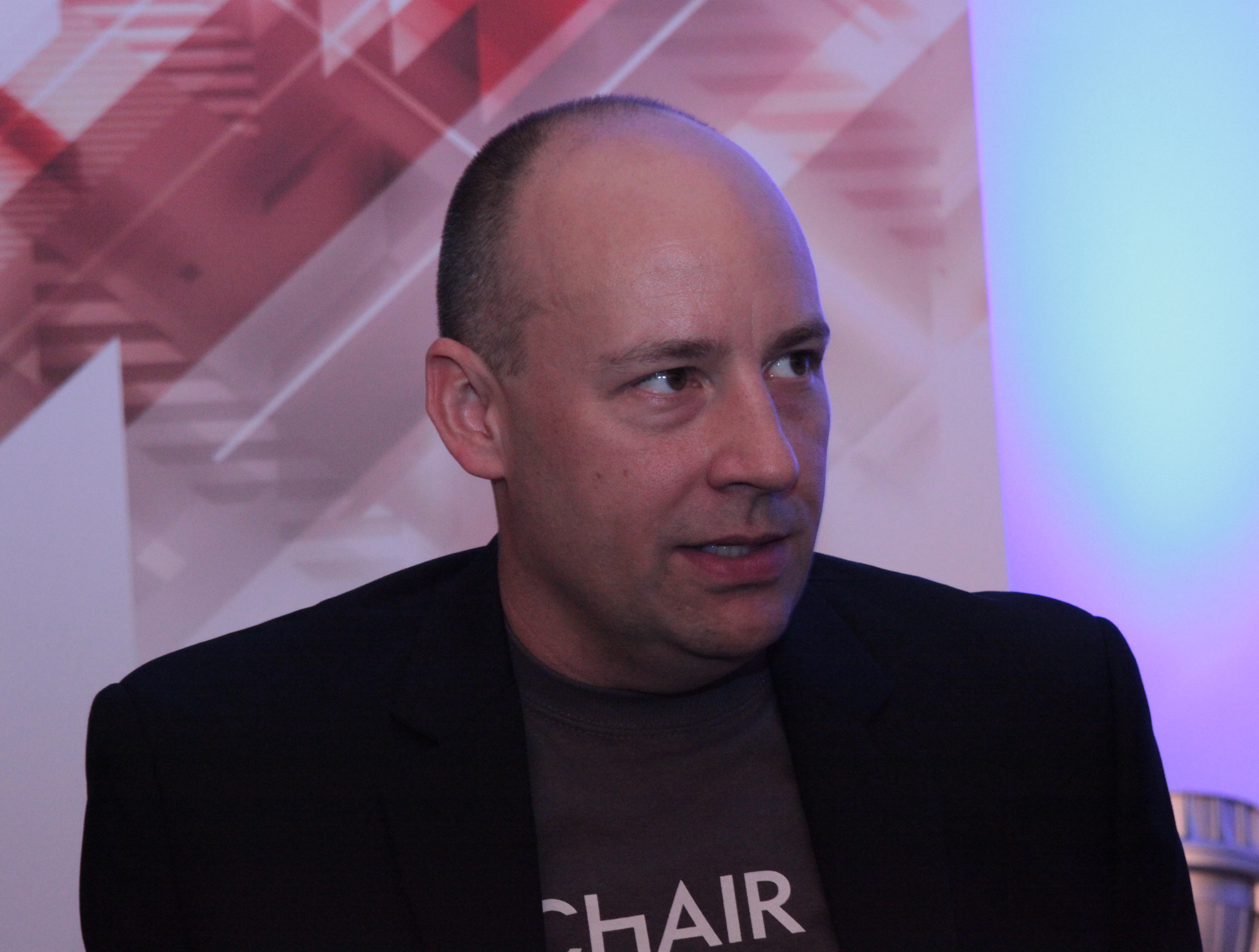
- Capps at GDC 2011
- Born: Michael V. Capps
- Education: University of North Carolina at Chapel Hill; Massachusetts Institute of Technology; Naval Postgraduate School
- Occupations: executive, video game developer
- Employers: Diveplane Corporation; Epic Games

Michael V. Capps or Mike Capps is an American video game designer who was the president of Epic Games, based in Cary, North Carolina from 2002 to 2012. In 2018, he co-founded a new artificial intelligence company called Howso.

== Early life ==
Capps attended the University of North Carolina at Chapel Hill, graduating summa cum laude with degrees in math and creative writing in 1994. He also earned his MS in computer science from the University of North Carolina at Chapel Hill in 1996.

Capps then went on to complete an SM in computer science and electrical engineering from the Massachusetts Institute of Technology in 1998, followed by a Ph.D. in computer science from the Naval Postgraduate School in 2002.

== Career ==
=== Naval Postgraduate School ===
Before entering the game industry, Capps served as a research assistant professor at the Naval Postgraduate School in Monterey, California from 1998 to 2002. His areas of specialization were computer graphics, defense and entertainment collaboration, and virtual reality. For his work in these areas, he was one of fifty graphics pioneers interviewed for the ACM SIGGRAPH documentary The Story of Computer Graphics.

Capps was selected by the Army's Office of Economic and Manpower Analysis (OEMA) to head its development team that was charged with designing a fun military video game. He became the producer, designer and lead programmer of the America’s Army computer game. He used Epic's Games' Unreal Engine to build the game.

=== Scion Studios ===
In 2002, Capps founded a video game company, Scion Studios, and became its CEO. Scion was acquired by Epic Games in March 2004.

=== Epic Games ===
Capps has been a game designer, executive producer, head writer, lead programmer, research professor, and studio executive. He is best known for his decade as the president of Epic Games, makers of the mega-hit Gears of War, Infinity Blade, Fortnite franchises, and the award-winning Unreal Engine. Under his leadership, Epic was named Studio of the Year at the 2006 Spike Video Game Awards, the North Carolina Technology Association 2007 Large Company of the Year, and the NCTA 2008 Top Industry Driven Technology Company of the Year. In addition, Gears of War won the Best Game and the Technology Award at Game Developers Choice Awards in 2007.

Capps also successfully defended video games using free speech before the U.S. Supreme Court. He stepped down from the post of president in December 2012.

=== Autarch ===
Capps is co-owner of Autarch LLC, responsible for award-winning tabletop role-playing games, such as Adventurer Conqueror King.

=== Howso (formerly Diveplane) ===
In 2018, Capps co-founded and became the CEO of Diveplane Corporation, an artificial intelligence start-up company based in Raleigh, North Carolina, along with Dr. Chris Hazard and Mike Resnick. Diveplane has eighteen employees and is backed by $3.5 million. It is working the areas of healthcare and NASCAR racing simulation. In 2019, Diveplane won first place at the UBS Future of Finance Challenge for its platform, GEMINAI. In September 2023, Diveplane rebranded as Howso alongside the release of the open source version of the Howso Engine in a critical step towards meaningful social impact.

=== Television appearances ===
Capps is the technology futurist for the Science Channel's What on Earth?, Combat Countdown, and NASA's The Unexplained Files. He has also been featured as a technology expert and futurist on multiple documentary series on the Discovery Channel and Military Channel.

== Awards ==
- 2007 Game Developers Choice Awards Best Game for Gears of War
- 2007 Game Developers Choice Awards Technology for Gears of War
- 2009 Technology Executive of the Year, North Carolina Technology Association
- 2012 CEO of the Year, WRAL Tech Wire Full Steam Ahead Awards
- 2012 Ernst & Young Entrepreneur of the Year finalist.
- 2016, Beacon Award for Lifetime Achievement, North Carolina Technology Association
- Game Developer 50, Game Developer

== Professional affiliations ==
Capps currently serves on the board of the Sphero entertainment robotics company in Colorado and is the chairman of the advisory board for the Lonerider Brewing Company. He also serves on the board of Epic Games. He also served as an advisor to the Game Developers Conference and the Video Games track. He was a member of the North Carolina Innovation Council. He is a frequent speaker at Dragon Con.

He served on the boards of the Academy of Interactive Arts & Sciences, the Entertainment Software Association, the Game Developers Conference, International Game Developers Association, and Remedy Entertainment in Finland. He was the Treasurer for the Board of the IGDA and was a member of the Entertainment Software Review Board.

== Personal life ==
Capps became a stay-at-home father when his two children were born. He returned to work as his children became older. He is a member of Change the Equation. He also serves on the board of The Raleigh School.

== Projects ==
=== Video games ===
==== Design ====
- America's Army: Operations (Epic Games, 2002)
- Unreal Championship 2: The Liandri Conflict (Epic Games, 2005)

==== Producer ====
- America's Army: Operations (2002)
- Gears of War (Epic Games/Microsoft Game Studios, 2006)
- Gears of War Limited Collectors Edition (Epic Games/Microsoft Games Studios, 2006)
- Unreal Tournament 3 (Epic Games, 2007)
- Gears of War Ultimate Edition (Epic Games, 2015)

==== Programming and engineering ====
- America's Army: Operations (2002)
- Unreal Tournament 2003 (Epic Games, 2003)
- Unreal Tournament 2004 (Epic Games, 2004)
- Unreal Championship 2: The Liandri Conflict (Epic Games, 2005)

==== Writer ====
- Unreal Tournament 3 (Epic Games, 2007)

==== President ====
- Gears of War 2 (Epic Games, 2008)
- Shadow Complex (Epic Games, 2009)
- Infinity Blade (Epic Games, 2010)
- Infinity Blade II (Epic Games, 2011)
- Gears of War 3 (Epic Games, 2011)
- Bulletstorm (Epic Games, 2011)
- Gears of War: Judgment (Epic Games 2013)

=== Tabletop games ===
- Marvel Multiverse Table Top Role Playing Game (Marvel, 2022)

=== Graphic novels ===
- Gears of War: Volume Two. Wildstorm, 2011. ISBN 9781401228019
