= Bookworm Adventures =

2006 puzzle video game

- Developer: PopCap Games
- Publisher: PopCap Games
- Designer: Jason Kapalka
- Composer: Staffan Melin
- Series: Bookworm
- Engine: PopCap Games Framework
- Platform: Windows
- Release: Windows (November 28, 2006); Steam (January 2, 2007)
- Genre: Puzzle
- Mode: Single-player

Bookworm Adventures is a word-forming puzzle video game, the follow-up to Bookworm from PopCap Games. Released in November 2006, Bookworm Adventures combines the "create words from sets of letters" aspect of Bookworm with several elements of a role-playing video game. In the 2007 Interactive Achievement Awards, Bookworm Adventures won the "Downloadable Game of the Year". The game also won three Zeeby awards for Best Word & Trivia Game of 2006, Best Game Design of 2006 and Best Story/Narrative of 2006.

A sequel for Bookworm Adventures, Bookworm Adventures: Volume 2, was released on July 30, 2009.

== Development ==
In contrast to the lower production budgets typical of most "casual games", PopCap Games spent over two and a half years and US$700,000 developing Bookworm Adventures. Although the direct sales model used by the company avoids various distribution and retail fees, this still represents one of the most expensive investments in the genre to date. John Vechey, PopCap's director, indicated that this did seem to be a departure from the previous model, noting that "A couple years ago, the prevailing wisdom was that it took three guys, six months and $100,000 to make a casual game. They used to be considered a low art form."

== Gameplay ==
Lex battling Medusa

The player takes on the role of Lex the Bookworm (voiced by the Chief Creative Officer of PopCap, Jason Kapalka) through a number of stages, battling creatures along the way (which are largely based on Greek mythology, One Thousand and One Nights and Gothic fiction, while the foes in the game's sequel are based on fairy tales, Journey to the West and science fiction). Each battle consists of Lex squaring off against a given enemy. Both Lex and his enemy have health meters (represented by a number of hearts) which, when depleted, signal defeat (advance to the next section and complete the chapter if an enemy is defeated, and restart when Lex dies). However, unlike more traditional role-playing games where players can injure their opponents with arms or magic, enemies in Bookworm Adventures are damaged by forming words.

As in the original Bookworm, words are formed from a grid of available letters, although unlike the original, the letter tiles used to form the words need not be adjacent to one another. The longer the word which is formed, the more damage is done to the enemy. Similarly, words generated using letters which are less common do more damage than those using only common letters. The game also features gems, which are generated by spelling more powerful words. Each gem has different effects, such as healing Lex and inflicting debuffs to the enemy. The "scramble" feature from the original title returns in Bookworm Adventures, which replaces the letters currently on the grid with an entirely new set, at the cost of forfeiting a turn, so that the enemy gets a "free" attack.

Each turn, the player can form a single word, while enemies use one of their available attacks to damage Lex, inflict debuffs to him, heal or buff themselves, or manipulate the tiles in the grid. During battles, the player can see what attacks and abilities the enemy can use, located at the bottom-right portion of the screen. Some of these attacks can combine two or more effects. After each battle victory, Lex automatically recovers to full health before proceeding to the next battle; however, there are certain chapters that feature "Survival Battles" (still called boss battles in the first game), where Lex will not be healed between enemies.

After a certain number of battles are won, a boss of significant difficulty is encountered. Once the boss is defeated, the chapter ends, and the player is rewarded with a treasure item. Treasures provide special abilities to Lex, such as a reduction in damage inflicted to him, or more damage generated from words containing certain letters, or even resistance to negative effects. In some cases, rather than receiving a new item, an existing item is upgraded, which improves the effect or ability of the old item. However, the player can only equip at most three treasure items in each chapter. In the sequel, the player can only bring along at most two treasure items, but can also have a companion, which gives a beneficial effect every four turns.

In addition to equipable items, players can earn consumable potions, which can be used for an immediate benefit. The potion varieties can recover some of Lex's health, enhance the strength of his next attack, or cure any ailments on Lex and/or the letter grid. While potions can be acquired gradually by defeating foes, potions can also be awarded for playing separate word-based mini-games between stages. In such mini-games, the player must try to either guess a secret word or form as many words as possible from a set of letters, with greater rewards for more skillful plays. In the sequel, the player can only have a maximum of 10 potions of each type, possibly to balance gameplay.

=== Game modes ===
There are three game modes in the first game, as well as two extra modes: Adventure, Tome of Knowledge, Mini-Games, Arena, and Clips and Giggles.

The Adventure mode is the main mode of the game, where the player follows the story of Lex as he solves the mystery of the Great Library, fighting the opponents in a fixed order. The Adventure mode contains three books, each containing ten chapters. Upon completion, the Adventure mode becomes permanently locked, meaning the player must create a new save file to replay the mode. However, in the sequel, the player can replay the Adventure mode (after completing it once) for high scores.

The Tome of Knowledge contains all information of the enemies, their attacks and abilities, their flavor text, and secrets that the player has found. This feature is unlocked after completing Book 1 in the Adventure mode. All enemies fought in the next two books in Adventure will be added here.

The Mini-Games are unlocked after completing Book 2 in the Adventure mode. As per its name, this mode allows the player to play three different mini-games (six in the sequel) and aim for a high score. In the Adventure mode, the player can play a pre-selected mini-game for rewards that can aid them in later chapters.

The Arena mode is unlocked after completing the Adventure mode (completing Book 3). Here, the player can battle through a series of bosses from the Adventure mode in fast-paced action (instead of the Adventure mode's turn-based gameplay), but not all the bosses appear. There is also a timer bar above the grid; if it's filled, the enemy will attack whether the player is ready or not. At the opposite side, the player can do several attacks in-between the enemy's attacks by spelling words quickly.

Clips and Giggles is where the comic introductions to each book and theme music of Bookworm Adventures can be found and replayed any time the player wishes. It also features commentary from the developers at PopCap Games. It is unlocked by completing the Arena mode. This extra does not reappear in the sequel.

== Release ==
Bookworm Adventures was released November 28, 2006, as packaged software, and released digitally over a nascent Steam shortly afterward on January 2, 2007. For unclear reasons, Electronic Arts, the rights holder which acquired PopCap Games in 2011, removed Bookworm Adventures from both Steam and EA's Origin in 2016, making the game impossible to purchase legally via digital download, a situation that has persisted since.

== Reception ==
Bookworm Adventures: Volume 2

Aggregate score
Aggregator	Score
Metacritic	79/100

Review scores
Publication	Score
Destructoid	9/10
Edge	8/10
Eurogamer	8/10
GamePro	4.5/5
GameRevolution	B+
IGN	8.3/10

Bookworm Adventures and the sequel Bookworm Adventures: Volume 2 received mostly positive reviews. GameRankings gave the original 78% and the sequel 79%. Metacritic ranked the original Bookworm Adventures at 82/100 and 79/100 for the sequel.

The Academy of Interactive Arts & Sciences awarded Bookworm Adventures with "Downloadable Game of the Year" at the 10th Annual Interactive Achievement Awards.

The American Library Association awarded the game with the "Notable Computer Software for Children" award in 2007.

== Legacy ==
In the sequel, there are a few additions and differences. All features and game modes from the previous game, except Clips and Giggles, return in the sequel, with identical unlock conditions. The books in the sequel's Adventure mode are referred to as Books 4–6, following the numbering of the prequel. The books are titled Fractured Fairytales, The Monkey King, and Astounding Planet, respectively. The Adventure mode also allows the player to choose the mini-game they want to play when there is a tent icon, as opposed to being brought to a particular mini-game in the prequel. The Arena mode in the sequel contains every boss in the sequel, excluding Previous Lex, Skeletrox (Dance Commander), and The Machine.

The sequel also features a new mode called Adventure Replay, which is unlocked after completing the Adventure mode (completing Book 6). This mode allows the player to replay the Adventure mode, which was impossible in the prequel without creating a new save file. The player can choose any of the three books to play through; Lex is leveled down equivalently to what he should be at the chapter, and the same rules for player survival applies. Instead of the level up bar at the top-left, the player can find the score bar; Lex levels up after every chapter. There are eight badges of four levels (Bronze, Silver, Gold, Platinum), which require the player to do some certain task; for example, defeating an enemy with Poison damage, spelling a 12-letter word, or using Diamond gems frequently.

Also introduced in the sequel are companions, which act similarly to treasures, but have a certain effect that is activated every four turns. For example, Mother Goose gives a health potion every four turns (unless the player has the maximum count of ten health potions, where Mother Goose will wait until the player uses one potion), and Skeletrox upgrades tiles to form better gems. To accommodate this new feature, the player can only bring two treasure items along with any chapter.
