= Mario Superstar Baseball =

2005 video game

- North American box art
- Developer: Namco (Note: Additional work by Now Production and Nintendo SPD)
- Publisher: Nintendo
- Director: Hideki Tomida
- Producers: Yasushi Ono; Toyokazu Nonaka
- Composers: Ayako Yamaguchi; Masasi Sugiyama; Nobuhiro Ohuchi; Kenichi Takahara; Toshio Kajino
- Series: Mario Baseball
- Platform: GameCube
- Release: JP: July 21, 2005; NA: August 29, 2005; AU: November 3, 2005; EU: November 11, 2005
- Genre: Sports (Baseball)
- Modes: Single-player, multiplayer

Mario Superstar Baseball (Note: Known in Japan as Super Mario Stadium Miracle Baseball (Japanese: スーパーマリオスタジアム ミラクルベースボール, Hepburn: Sūpā Mario Sutajiamu Mirakuru Bēsubōru)) is a 2005 sports video game developed by Namco and published by Nintendo for the GameCube. The game was created in the vein of other Mario sports games such as Mario Golf: Toadstool Tour and Mario Power Tennis. A sequel, Mario Super Sluggers, was released for the Wii in 2008.

Gameplay mainly focuses on the player assuming the role of many Mario series characters to challenge any opposing teams compatible in the Challenge Mode, the final being Bowser, having baseball matches to see who will win the Cup of the mode. Other playable modes include Exhibition Mode, in which players choose the leader and the other rosters in the team and challenge another team to a single baseball game, and Minigames where the player must complete a certain mission. A common power-up in the game is a charged swing, a hit by a baseball bat performed by a character that will give the ball a strong hit, causing the length of a normal hit baseball to be twice as powerful. The game was released in Japan on July 21, 2005, North America on August 29, 2005, Australia on November 3, 2005, and Europe on November 11, 2005, and received generally favorable reviews from critics.

== Game modes ==
=== Exhibition Game ===
A single game of baseball, players choose the team captain and a roster of players, and play one game.Players can choose which team bats first. Players can also choose how many innings the game will last, and pick their choice out of six unique stadiums. Bowser's Castle can be unlocked after beating Challenge Mode.

=== Challenge ===
The heart of Mario Superstar Baseball is the Challenge Mode. It is a single-player mode where the player selects a pre-built team and must defeat all the other teams; at first Bowser's team is the last team to beat for the cup, and must be unlocked before the player can use him. There are six teams, each led by one of the Captains (Mario, Peach, Yoshi, Donkey Kong, Wario, and Bowser), features a secondary captain (Luigi, Daisy, Birdo, Diddy Kong, Waluigi, and Bowser Jr.), and is filled with a mix of sub characters, some of which are duplicated within a team, but do not appear on any other team. For example, aside from the aforementioned captains and sub-captains, Mario's team consists of Monty Mole, 3 Piantas, and 3 Nokis, Princess Peach's team consists of Toadette, Toadsworth, and 5 Toads, Wario's team consists of Boo, King Boo, Petey Piranha, and 4 Magikoopas, Yoshi's team consists of Baby Mario, Baby Luigi, and 5 Shy Guys, Donkey Kong's team consists of Dixie Kong, Goomba, Paragoomba, 2 Paratroopas, and 2 Koopa Troopas, and Bowser's team consists of 4 Dry Bones, Hammer Bro, Fire Bro, and Boomerang Bro (although Hammer Bro, Fire Bro and Boomerang Bro are separate characters (enemies) in the Mario series, in this game, it is actually just a color variation of the same character.). Players challenge the other teams, beating the other four opens the path to Bowser's castle. The secondary purpose of defeating other teams is to recruit other characters to improve ones team. On opposing teams, each character has a set of scouting flags. During the game players will have mission objectives like "Strike 'em out", or "Score a run", that earn flags; if one gets all the flags of a particular character and wins the game, that character will be recruited. If the player fails to complete a mission, they must wait for a while to complete another mission. Flags are cumulative, so if the player doesn't get all the flags in a game, or loses the game after getting all the flags, the flags earned will remain when the team is challenged again; a team can be challenged as long as the captain of the team is not recruited. Players of a different color can't be recruited and can only be played in minigames and playing with the teams they start on.

If the team captain is recruited, his or her team will disband; any characters from that team that were not recruited will join a team led by Bowser Jr. Another way to recruit characters is by a mercy win; if either team is leading by at least 10 runs at the end of an inning, the game is called out of mercy to the losing team. If the player wins a game in this fashion, all characters on the opposing team will be so impressed that they will immediately join.

After every game or minigame, Bowser Jr. will wander around the map; if the player runs into him, they will be forced to play a game in the bottom of the 9th inning, with the player randomly chosen as visitor or home. If the player's team is the visiting team, then they will have the lead and must stop Bowser Jr. from mounting a comeback; otherwise, it is the player's job to mount a comeback. Beating Bowser Jr. earns the player 100 coins to use in the shop, while losing costs the player half of their coins. In the event of having an odd coin count when losing to Bowser Jr., the coins will be rounded up. Bowser Jr.'s team also has players from disbanded teams that the player can recruit; in which case the only mission objective is "Win the game."

There is a shop located on the map for purchasing power-ups, each worth a certain number of coins that the player earns from the minigames or Bowser Jr. In order for a Captain to use their special abilities, they must be purchased from the shop; these power-ups are permanent, and can be carried over into other Challenge Mode games by continuing from a previously cleared game. Other power-ups offer a temporary boost to a stat for all characters on their team, but they only last for one game, win or lose. A Toad runs the shop.

Another goal during Challenge Mode is the Superstar quest; each character has a set of requirement that earn stars. If a character meets all of his or her requirements, then the character upgrades to a Superstar, and gets a boost in all their abilities. Also, once a character becomes a Superstar, the Superstar version of the character can be used in other game modes. There's a simple way to figure out the number of superstar missions per player. The captain of the team has 10 missions. The 2nd captain has eight. Minor characters have six. And characters of race (excluding Monty Mole who has six) have four. Note that players like Red Koopa and Black Shy Guy can be unlocked by completing the main changing color player like Blue Pianta & Blue Noki.

The game rules that cannot be changed are as follows: Your team bats first, and the Star Skills and mercy are turned on. There are four difficulty settings for challenge mode that are similar to those of Mario Kart: Double Dash - Mushroom (easy), Flower (medium), Star (hard), and Special (very hard). On Mushroom, Flower, and Star difficulty setting, four other teams are challenged for three innings. After each team has been beaten at least once, Bowser is played for five innings. On Special difficulty setting, the innings change so that each team is played with two additional innings from before. Once the player clears Special difficulty, then Bowser is selectable as a team captain. When using him as a team captain, the rules slightly change: The other teams invade Bowser's castle, and Bowser must beat them in a game of baseball to win his castle back. Bowser has to beat the initial five teams, then they come together to form a team of captains led by Mario that Bowser must defeat; Bowser can still recruit other characters, except the captains and sub-captains; and because Bowser Jr. is on his team, he does not wander the map to challenge a player, so you must play minigames to earn coins.

== Reception ==
Reception

Aggregate scores
| Aggregator | Score |
|---|---|
| GameRankings | 76.70% |
| Metacritic | 76/100 |

Review scores
| Publication | Score |
|---|---|
| Edge | 6/10 |
| Electronic Gaming Monthly | 7/10 |
| Eurogamer | 6/10 |
| Game Informer | 7/10 |
| GamePro | 4/5 |
| GameSpot | 8/10 |
| GameSpy | 4/5 |
| GameTrailers | 8.5/10 |
| GameZone | 8/10 |
| IGN | 7.9/10 |
| Nintendo Power | 9/10 |
| Detroit Free Press | 3/4 |
| The Sydney Morning Herald | 3/5 |

The game was met with positive reception, as GameRankings gave it a score of 76.70%, while Metacritic gave it 76 out of 100.

Robert Workman of GameDaily praised the game, writing, "...I found [Mario Superstar Baseball] to grow on me." IGN praised the game, while noting its inconsistent production values GameSpot awarded the game an 8 out of 10.

=== Awards ===
- G-Phoria's Best Alternative Sports Game for 2006
