= Damon Baird =

Fictional character in the Gears of War video game series

- Gears of War character
- Damon Baird as he appears in Gears of War: Ultimate Edition (2015)
- First appearance: Gears of War (2006)
- Designed by: Cliff Bleszinski
- Voiced by: Fred Tatasciore

In-universe information
- Family: Jocelin Baird (father); Elinor-Lytton Baird (mother)
- Significant other: Samantha Byrne (girlfriend)

Damon S. Baird is a fictional character in the Gears of War franchise. He first appeared in the first and eponymous video game of the series as a supporting character. He has since appeared in every mainline installment of the Gears franchise, and is featured as the main protagonist of the spin-off title, Gears of War: Judgment. He is voiced by Fred Tatasciore in all video game appearances.

Within the series, Baird is a soldier who enlisted with the Coalition of Ordered Governments ("COG"), a supranational and intergovernmental human military collective since Emergence Day, to fight a race of subterranean reptilian hominids known as the Locust Horde in their genocidal war against humanity on the planet Sera. He is depicted as a polymath who is an expert in several technical, mechanical, and scientific fields. Baird is known for his abrasive, wise-cracking personality, which often puts him at odds with series protagonist Marcus Fenix. While Baird is considered a fan favorite among many series fans, he has proven to be a divisive character among video game journalists.

== Creation and development ==
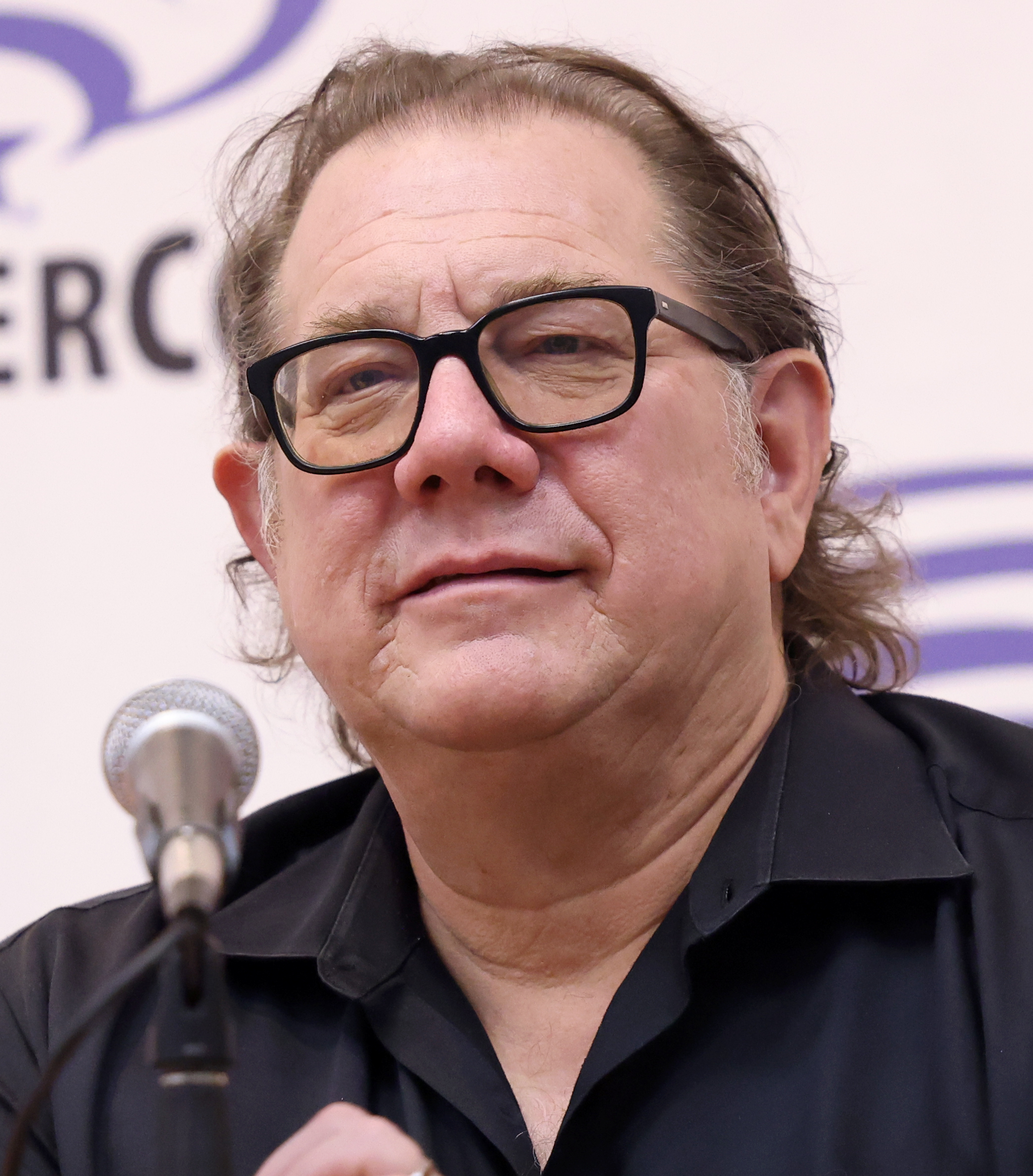
Fred Tatasciore voiced Baird in all of his appearances.

Baird is named after a childhood friend of Cliff Bleszinski, who helped create the franchise and served as Design Director of Epic Games. At one point during the first game's development, the roles of Baird and his close friend Augustus Cole were entirely reversed, with English soccer player David Beckham serving as the archetype and visual cue for Baird as a sports star character. Baird's original visual inspiration was based on Denis Leary. One of Baird's trademark accessories are a pair of goggles, which later in the series becomes a source of inspiration for Delmont "Del" Walker, who is also adept in electronics and robotics.

Baird was chosen as the lead character of Gears of War: Judgment due to his status as a fan favorite character from the original trilogy who never had the spotlight. Lead level designer for Judgment Jim Brown thought of Baird as an interesting character who offers compelling storytelling opportunities. Writers Tom Bissell and Rob Auten wanted to explore an aspect of the series lore which is connected to the Emergence Day event; the story arc of Judgment, about the downfall of Kilo squad led by Baird, is presented in the aftermath of Emergence Day, a watershed moment that started the overarching narrative of the franchise. The creative team also wanted to depict Baird's character in his youth as the enthusiastic young leader of a squad, before he experienced his military career downfall and becomes a character widely regarded as the "cynical jerk" in the original trilogy.

Prior to the game's official announcement, Game Informer revealed shaded cover art featuring the silhouette of a muscle-bound man in chains; many fans initially assumed the unidentified man was Marcus Fenix. Bleszinski disclosed in an interview that the mysterious cover made for a "cool reveal", while fan interest in Baird was another motivator. The nature of Baird's interactions with the members of his squad in Judgment, including Cole as they had only known each other for one month by that point, were meant to convey the impression that Kilo Squad is not a cohesive military unit. The writers felt that this creates an interesting, "jagged" dynamic which had not existed in the original trilogy; the creative process was further informed by real life military servicemen who recounted their experiences to the writing team about working closely with team mates they had a genuine dislike for.

Within the series, Baird is depicted as a comic relief character and a mechanical genius who is very well-versed with technology, but also possesses an abrasive arrogance with a sarcastic tongue. Fred Tatasciore, who voices the character in all media, consider him to be an "annoying big brother" archetype who has a "big heart" but prefers a "tough love" approach. Producer Rod Fergusson disclosed in a 2012 interview that Baird is one of his favorite characters as they share similar personality traits, and that Baird makes sarcastic remarks that he would say in real life. Bissell and Auten explained in an interview with IGN that Baird is a rich kid who always wanted to be a mechanic and loves tinkering with machinery and robotics, aspirations his wealthy parents disapproved of. In terms of game mechanics, Baird or his robot companion Jack often fill the role of unlocking a locked or blocked door which represents a gameplay obstacle for the player at predetermined points of the single player campaigns in the series.

Baird's expertise in engineering and robotics is further emphasized in the sequels to the original trilogy where he is CEO of Damon Baird Industries, which mass-produces advanced automated robots and mechs for COG. In Gears of War 4 he provides the protagonists with a pair of militarized giant mechs, controllable and armored versions of standard builder mechs armed with giant staple guns, to aid them in combat against the Swarm, successors to the original Locust Horde. In Gears 5 he works closely with the COG in their war effort against the Swarm; his laboratory is situated in a side wing of a government building in the COG capital city of New Ephyra, where he introduces the player to new technology and mission updates. The dark and dingy design of his laboratory is contrasted with the polished halls of the building it is housed in, reflecting his personality differences with the politicians and government members of the COG.

== Appearances ==
In Gears of War, Baird and his comrade Augustus Cole are first encountered by Marcus Fenix and Dominic Santiago as the surviving members of Alpha Squad, and is later folded into Delta Squad along with Augustus Cole after the rest of Alpha Squad is confirmed to be killed in action. While a member of Delta Squad, Baird would quickly expresses disdain for Fenix's leadership, and indicates that he thinks he should have been promoted to lead the squad. He often making sarcastic remarks and frequently undermines Fenix's authority, though his attitude towards Fenix gradually improves over the course of the original trilogy. Besides his technical knowledge and expertise, Baird also takes an interest in Locust culture and collects various weapons, equipment, artifacts and documents related to the Locust for analysis, his findings occasionally serving as in-universe narrations of lore in the series. In Gears of War 2 he is taken prisoner by the Locust Horde but is later rescued by Delta Squad, and provides commentary about Locust culture and society which he observed during his captivity. In Gears of War 3 Baird helps repair the Hammer of Dawn, a solar energy-based superweapon instrumental in fighting the Locust Horde, and succeeds in doing so. In the second half of Act III and in Act IV, his whereabouts with Cole remains unknown till the final act when they both arrive with backup from the UIR in the final battle with the Locust and Lambent. He helps Fenix and the rest of the squad fight off Queen Myrrah to allow Adam Fenix to activate his weapon in order to wipe out both the Lambent infestation and the Locust race.

Baird appears as the main character in Gears of War: Judgment, where it is revealed that he previously held the higher rank of lieutenant and was the leader of Kilo Squad. After using a weapon known as the Lightmass Missile to try to kill General Karn, Baird was put on trial for his actions and while the charges were ultimately dropped, Colonel Loomis demoted him to private and destroyed any chance of him becoming a commissioned officer again. The Aftermath campaign for Judgment showcases his return to the city of Halvo Bay in search of a ship to reach Azura during Gears of War 3 and his reunion with former Kilo squadmate Garron Paduk, who reveals that the fourth member of Kilo, Sofia Hendrick, was kidnapped by COG forces before Baird's arrival.

After the events of 3, Baird left the military to set up his own company, Damon Baird Industries, and used his engineering and mechanical expertise to help the world rebuild after the war. He created the automated robots, known colloquially as "DeeBees" after his own initials, to collect garbage and rubble. The DeeBees were eventually incorporated by COG into its security forces and weaponized, and they would appear as recurring enemies of the Outsider faction in Gears of War 4. Baird appears in the last act of 4 with his best friend Cole and his partner Samantha Byrne to aid Marcus, his son J.D. Fenix, and their friends Kait Diaz and Delmont "Del" Walker to fend off Swarm forces. He reveals to J.D., with whom he shares an antagonistic relationship, that he had been monitoring him and his friends from behind the scenes in order to protect him from COG leadership for deserting; in this manner, Baird was secretly responsible for helping JD, Del, Kait and Oscar Diaz escape Jinn's forces during a settlement raid earlier in the game. He plays a larger role in Gears 5 as he provides tactical and technical support for the reformed Delta Squad and their allies in their war effort against the Swarm and spearheads the mission to restore the Hammer of Dawn behind Jinn's back with the help of Garron Paduk.

== Reception ==
Baird is a divisive character. The character has been identified as a fan favorite of the Gears of War series by multiple sources. Bleszinski claimed in an interview with Game Informer that Epic Games had access to data from Microsoft which shows Baird as one of the most beloved characters in the entire franchise, and he personally believed that Baird resonated with many gamers as sarcastic, cynical, and snarky behavior is a prevalent part of internet culture. IGN considers the character to be an "unsung hero" of the series due to his numerous in-universe contributions to the COG's war effort. Conversely, Brian Feldman from NYMag considered Baird to be the franchise's worst supporting character. Rus McLaughlin from VentureBeat called Baird "a sentient dick move" and described him as an unpleasant character who serves as little more than comic relief, in spite of his considerable intellect and competence. In his review of Judgment for Giant Bomb, Jeff Gerstmann considered Baird to be the most extraneous character in the Gears universe, though he noticed a lack of complaining behavior compared to the character's appearances in earlier installments of the series.

Several reviews for Judgment commented on the different nature of Baird's interactions with the squad he leads compared to the camaraderie in the original trilogy, and discussed the player's discretion to replay an alternate series of events in flashbacks as Declassified mission sequences, which are then retold in the testimonies provided by Baird and rest of his squad as a form of branching narrative and gameplay variety. In his review of Judgment for IGN, Mitch Myer observed that the game is surprisingly effective at exposing the deeper, more vulnerable qualities of characters like Baird and Cole, noting that it is hard not to sympathize with Baird as he destroyed his terrific military record because he took the initiative to do what is right instead of what he is told by his superiors.

Feldman called Baird's redesign as an aged character in Gears of War 4 "comically hideous", claiming that the creators of the new design must hate Baird as much as the franchise's fanbase do. In September 2019, Tyler Fischer from Comicbook.com reported on trending tweets which pointed out the similarity of Baird's appearance in Gears 5 to that of professional wrestler Bill Goldberg.
