= Tom Clancy's Rainbow Six: Vegas =

2006 video game

- Developers: Ubisoft Montreal; Ubisoft Quebec (PSP)
- Publisher: Ubisoft (Note: Mobile version developed and published by Gameloft.)
- Director: Maxime Béland
- Producer: Chadi Lebbos
- Designer: Jean-Pascal Cambiotti
- Programmers: Luc Bouchard; Benoît Frappier
- Artist: Olivier Léonardi
- Writer: Lucien Soulban
- Composer: Paul Haslinger
- Series: Tom Clancy's Rainbow Six
- Engine: Unreal Engine 3 Unreal Engine 2 (PSP)
- Platforms: Windows, Xbox 360, PlayStation 3, PlayStation Portable, mobile phone
- Release: November 20, 2006: Xbox 360; NA: November 20, 2006; EU: December 1, 2006 Mobile; WW: December 12, 2006 Windows; NA: December 12, 2006; EU: December 15, 2006 PS3, PSP; NA: June 12, 2007 (PSP); NA: June 26, 2007 (PS3); AU: June 28, 2007; UK: June 29, 2007
- Genres: Tactical shooter, first-person shooter
- Modes: Single-player, multiplayer

Tom Clancy's Rainbow Six: Vegas is the fifth main game in the Rainbow Six series of video games. It was released in November 2006 for the Xbox 360, December 2006 for Windows, and in June 2007 for the PlayStation 3 and PlayStation Portable. The game's storyline follows a new team that is dispatched to Las Vegas, Nevada to defeat international terrorist Irena Morales and her army of mercenaries that are repeatedly attacking key locations in the city. A sequel developed by Ubisoft Montreal was released on Xbox 360, and PlayStation 3 consoles in March 2008 and on PC in April 2008. The game is also playable on Xbox One and Xbox Series X/S with online features still available.

== Gameplay ==
Rainbow Six Vegas changes the series with multiple new features, such as a new health system where the player regenerates health while not taking fire (the player may sometimes be killed instantly, without a chance to regenerate health; this usually happens from grenades, as well as taking close-range fire from very powerful weapons like shotguns, particularly to the head). The player's vision is greatly impaired while damaged, similar to the health system in Gears of War. Furthermore, a third-person view has been included for moments where players can blind-fire around corners to lay down suppression or covering fire. Other changes include a larger enemy presence and much tougher artificial intelligence, a shift in focus to where kills will be much harder to obtain, a reincarnated aiming system similar to the aiming system of the old Rainbow Six games and a context-sensitive D-pad based command system for the player's squad and sections of gameplay where the player will scale buildings and cause environmental damage. The player can also give voice commands using the Xbox 360 and PlayStation 3 headset, but teammates are no longer audible through the headset.

There is no mission planning feature or save system; instead, the game uses a checkpoint system. The developers also opted to almost entirely exclude cutscenes, telling the story through video feeds on a heads-up display. The player also has various skills, such as the ability to rappel up and down buildings while shooting and the ability to fast rope into an area.

In the PSP version, the multiplayer has an online limitations and supports up to four players (both via infrastructure and ad hoc where applicable), offering modes such as Survival and Team Survival. The maps are fewer, some drawn from past Rainbow Six titles, though overall the multiplayer component is more modest in scope.

== Plot ==
In 2010, Rainbow operatives Logan Keller, Gabriel Nowak and Kan Akahashi are deployed to a Mexican border town, where they are tasked with capturing Irena Morales, a terrorist ringleader. As the team reaches its landing zone, Logan is separated from the others after he fast-ropes down first.

Logan fights his way through the town and manages to regroup with Gabriel and Kan at an old church. After infiltrating a train yard and freeing a group of hostages, the team eventually makes its way to a mine where Irena is hiding. However, they are ambushed, and Gabriel and Kan are captured as Irena escapes.

Alone and armed only with his pistol, Logan fights his way through an abandoned factory, eventually escaping by helicopter. He is then redeployed to handle a related crisis in Las Vegas. He is dropped outside the Calypso Casino and links up with his new team: Michael Walters and Jung Park. The team clears out the casino and saves a group of hostages, including a NATO weapons researcher, who reveals that another scientist has been captured.

The team then rescues a kidnapped reporter, who informs them that the terrorists are using a news van as a communications hub. Logan's team sends a transmission and destroys the hub, then heads to rescue the second weapons researcher. Rainbow is dropped on the Vertigo Spire luxury hotel, where the team finds and rescues the missing researcher, who informs the team about a micro-pulse bomb that was planted in the Vertigo. Michael disarms the bomb, and the team is then extracted to locate Gabriel and Kan. However, a normal bomb devastates a tower adjacent to the hotel.

The team is dispatched to Dante's Casino, where they find Gabriel and Kan. However, Kan is fatally wounded during extraction. He manages to reveal that the attack in Las Vegas is a distraction before dying. The team then proceeds to a theatre to hack a terrorist server where they discover that Irena's target is the Nevada Dam.

As they arrive at the dam, the team discovers another micro-pulse bomb which they defuse. They then encounter a hostage who informs them that the dam will collapse if they do not activate an emergency release valve. After activating the valve, the team proceed into the facility, where they discover that it is a weapons research lab. They also find that the terrorists have a micro-pulse missile on top of the dam.

Logan presses forward, confronts Irena, and kills her. The team then heads to the top of the dam and destroys the missile. Logan receives a transmission from Gabriel, who tells him that he was Irena's mole before hijacking the team's helicopter.

As Gabriel attempts to escape with the helicopter, Logan can either let him escape or shoot him down. Later, Logan and the team are sent out to locate the organization behind Irena and Gabriel's terrorist activity. Much later, a news clip states that a helicopter had crashed into a lake, but no bodies were found.

=== PSP version ===
The PSP version of Tom Clancy's Rainbow Six: Vegas is an entirely different game rather than a direct port due to hardware limitations. Unlike the main version, which follows Logan Keller and his team in Las Vegas, the PSP version focuses on a parallel storyline starting with two different operatives: Brian Armstrong, as an assault specialist, and Shawn Rivers, as a sniper, who are tasked with completing missions tied into the same overarching crisis. Their mission is initially to locate the Rainbow operatives Gabriel Nowak and Kan Akahashi, who have been kidnapped during the events at the Mexican border. Armstrong and Rivers then uncover that their primary target, Lucas Picares, is orchestrating a biochemical threat: plans to poison Las Vegas’s water supply as well as further sabotage tied to the dam infrastructure. As they progress, they follow leads through several locations, including a private airport, a tower, and a water filtration plant. The story shifts focus to preventing the release of the bio-weapon, rescuing hostages, and stopping Picare's larger destructive plot. It only has at least five campaign missions, each taking 20 to 30 minutes to complete approximately, making it shorter than the main version.

== Development ==
The game was in development for more than 2 years. 180 people worked on the game.

=== Patches ===
During November 2007, the North American Support Supervisor announced on the Ubisoft forums that Ubisoft "has and will always provide support for this title", and also confirmed that Ubisoft was working on another patch." The patch was released on July 19, 2007, and updated the game to version 1.05. Since that time, Ubisoft has released the latest patch 1.06.

=== Collector's Edition ===
A Limited Collector's Edition of Rainbow Six: Vegas was released at the game's launch featuring alternative cover art and a bonus disc. The bonus disc contained a documentary on the making of Rainbow Six: Vegas and a Rainbow Six retrospective, which features information on all Rainbow Six games in the series.

=== Expansion packs ===
On April 18, 2007, the Player's Pack Red Edition was released as downloadable content on Xbox Live. The pack includes two new game modes. The first is "Assassination" whereby one team has to protect a VIP armed only with a pistol, whilst the other team needs to assassinate him. The second is Conquest (a "capture and hold"-style game, whereby each team has to hold as many strategic points for as long as possible). Three new maps were also included: "Doscala Restaurant," "Marshalling Yard," and "Roof." The maps "Killhouse" and "Border Town" have been redesigned and packaged as two new "redux" maps. The expansion pack comes directly after an update was released for the game. All original game modes and maps are compatible with those featured in the Player's Pack Red Edition. On July 6, 2007, the Red Pack was made available for download free of charge.

On June 26, 2007, a new downloadable content pack was released. The Player's Pack Black Edition features five new maps. "Red Lotus", "Wartown" and "Neon Graveyard" are the three newly featured maps. "Streets: Redux" has been redesigned in a similar fashion to the Redux maps found in the Player's Pack Red Edition, and "Presidio" is a map overhauled and upgraded from Tom Clancy's Rainbow Six 3: Raven Shield. On June 27, 2007, the Black Edition was retracted from the Xbox Live Marketplace. Ubisoft announced that it was pulled due to a pricing error and that the pack (which was originally priced at 800 Microsoft Points) was intended to be free. On June 30, 2007, the Black Edition was re-released for download free of charge; Xbox Live users who paid for the pack had their points reimbursed.

Both the Red and the Black player packs were released for PC platform on July 26, 2007, and are included in the PS3 retail version.

== Reception ==
Reception

Aggregate scores
Aggregator	Score
GameRankings	(X360) 89.39% (PS3) 84.74% (PC) 84.10% (PSP) 60.89%
Metacritic	(X360) 88/100 (PS3) 86/100 (PC) 85/100 (PSP) 60/100

Review scores
Publication	Score
Edge	6/10
Electronic Gaming Monthly	8/10
Eurogamer	(X360) 8/10 (PC) 7/10 (PSP) 3/10
Game Informer	(X360) 9.5/10 (PS3) 9/10
GamePro	4.75/5
GameRevolution	B+
GameSpot	(X360) 9.1/10 (PS3) 9/10 (PC) 8.7/10 (PSP) 6.8/10
GameSpy	(X360) 5/5 (PS3) 3.5/5
GameTrailers	(X360) 9.1/10 (PS3) 8.8/10
GameZone	(X360) 9.5/10; 8.5/10 (PSP) 7/10
IGN	(X360, AU) 9.4/10 (X360, US) 9.3/10 (PS3) 8.7/10 (PC) 8.4/10 (Mobile) 7.6/10 (PSP) 5.5/10
Official Xbox Magazine (US)	8.5/10
PC Gamer (US)	86%
Detroit Free Press	4/4

The Xbox 360 edition of Rainbow Six: Vegas was released to very positive reviews from major gaming news outlets, such as GameSpy (5/5), GameSpot (9.1/10), IGN (9.3/10), and TeamXbox (9.5/10). IGN called Vegas the "best first-person shooter on the Xbox 360", while GameSpot described the game as an "excellent, immersive tactical shooter". Hyper's Cam Shea commended the game for its "fantastic visual design, game mechanics and multiplayer". However, he criticized "some of the voice acting and terrorist supply closets". The PC and PS3 versions have also received positive reviews, while the PSP version received mixed reviews.

Rainbow Six Vegas has won numerous awards, including "Best First-Person Shooter", "Best Xbox 360 First-Person Shooter", "Best Online Game", and "Best Xbox Live Game" in IGN's Best of 2006, as well as an "Editor's Choice Award" from GameSpot. Gaming Target also selected the title as one of "52 Games We will Still Be Playing From 2006". It also received the "Best Online Game" award from Official Xbox Magazine in their annual Game of the Year awards. The editors of Computer Games Magazine presented Vegas with their 2006 "Best Action Game" award and named it the fourth-best computer game of the year. During the 10th Annual Interactive Achievement Awards, the Academy of Interactive Arts & Sciences awarded Rainbow Six: Vegas with "First-Person Action Game of the Year", along with receiving a nomination for "Outstanding Achievement in Art Direction".

According to Ubisoft, as of March 31, 2007, Tom Clancy's Rainbow Six: Vegas had sold 1.7 million copies. The Xbox 360 version received a "Platinum" sales award from the Entertainment and Leisure Software Publishers Association (ELSPA), indicating sales of at least 300,000 copies in the United Kingdom.

== Major League Gaming ==
In early 2007, Rainbow Six: Vegas became the first Xbox 360 title to join the Major League Gaming (MLG) Circuit. It premiered in the opening event of the season in Charlotte, North Carolina. This game had its last showing at Las Vegas Nevada, the final stop on the 2007 MLG Pro Circuit. However, Rainbow Six: Vegas 2, the game's sequel, was featured on the 2008 MLG Pro Circuit, with its first showing in San Diego, California.
