= Gears of War 3 =

2011 video game

- Developer: Epic Games
- Publisher: Microsoft Studios
- Producers: Tanya Jessen; Chris Mielke
- Designer: Cliff Bleszinski
- Programmer: Joe Graf
- Artists: Chris Perna; Wyeth Johnson
- Writers: Karen Traviss; Eric Nylund; Aaron Linde
- Composer: Steve Jablonsky
- Series: Gears of War
- Engine: Unreal Engine 3
- Platform: Xbox 360
- Release: September 20, 2011
- Genre: Third-person shooter
- Modes: Single-player, multiplayer

Gears of War 3 is a 2011 third-person shooter video game developed by Epic Games and published by Microsoft Studios for the Xbox 360. It is the third installment of the Gears of War series, and final game in the original trilogy. Originally due for release on April 8, 2011, the game was delayed and eventually released on September 20, 2011. The story was written by science fiction author Karen Traviss.

Like its predecessors, Gears of War 3 received widespread critical acclaim from critics. Critics praised its story, voice acting, visuals, and music, but criticized its lack of innovation. Gears of War 3 sold over 3 million copies and was the second best selling game in the U.S.

A sequel titled Gears of War 4, developed by The Coalition, was released in 2016.

== Gameplay ==
Like its predecessors, Gears of War 3 is a third-person shooter that emphasizes the use of cover and squad tactics in order to survive combat situations. The player's character can carry four weapons: one pistol, one set of grenades, and two primary weapons. Firearms can be swapped with other weapons dropped by fallen foes or at stockpiles throughout the game, along with ammunition. When the player reloads a weapons ammunition, they have an opportunity for an "active reload", shown by a small cursor moving over a line with a marked section on the player's heads-up display (HUD). If the player hits a control button when the cursor is in the marked section, they will reload faster with the resulting reload being slightly more powerful than normal bullets, causing more damage to opponents as well as allowing for more "knockback" meaning that enemies running directly at you will be slowed on shot. If they press the button outside this section, this temporarily jams the weapon, leaving the player vulnerable and taking longer to reload. Alternatively, the player can opt to not try for the active reload, reloading the weapon at normal speed, but with no added damage.

When in combat, the player can take some damage from enemy fire, filling a blood-colored "crimson omen" on the HUD as a measure of the player's health, unlike the traditional health bar in other shooters. By staying out of the line of fire, this will dissipate over time, but by taking too much damage, the player will become downed or killed, and must be "revived" by an ally within a short "bleed-out" period, or else the player will die, unless playing the game on Insane difficulty in which case a player will die immediately after taking too much damage without the bleed-out. The player can also be killed during the bleed-out by the use of the game's signature execution moves by the enemy. Some types of damage, such as explosives or head shots, can kill the player immediately without the bleed-out period. Similarly, the player can also cause enemies to fall into bleed-out in the same manner. The player and their allies and enemies can use nearly any structure as cover, firing blind from behind it or leaning out to take aimed shots while usually exposing their head more. Players can quickly switch between nearby covering walls or jump over lower cover to rush forward. Within Gears of War 3, some cover can be destroyed after taking some amount of damage, which can be used to a tactical advantage to draw out enemies from cover.

New to Gears of War 3 is the ability to tag enemy opponents; computer-controlled allies will then concentrate fire on these marked enemies, while human allies will be alerted to their location on their HUD. Players can now also swap weapons and ammunition (and money during Horde Mode) with other allies in the course of battle.

The player maintains an experience level that persists across all game modes. The player earns experience through kills, performing special types of kills and executions, reviving and aiding teammates, and through general process of the campaign or competitive modes. Players can also gain experience points by winning medals and ribbons, which are awarded for defeating enemies with certain weapons or winning several matches. Earning levels unlocks the use of special characters and weapon skins within the game's multiplayer mode.

== Synopsis ==
=== Setting ===
Marcus Fenix and Delta Squad as seen during a four-player campaign co-op mission on board the CNV Sovereign

Gears of War 3 takes place two years after Jacinto, humanity's last stronghold, is destroyed in an effort to completely eradicate the Locust Horde. The Coalition of Ordered Governments (COG) remnants relocate to Vectes, a secluded island, in order to rebuild their civilization. The COG then disbands after Chairman Prescott mysteriously disappears and seemingly abandons his forces. A new foe, the Lambent, are threatening humanity's dwindling numbers. As the Lambent begin to invade Vectes, Marcus Fenix and his comrades retreat to the CNV Sovereign, a helicopter carrier, and take refuge at sea, whilst Hoffman leads other survivors back to the mainland to find haven at Anvil Gate. Delta Squad now consists of Marcus Fenix, Dominic 'Dom' Santiago, Anya Stroud, Damon Baird, Augustus 'Cole Train' Cole, Jace Stratton, Clayton Carmine and Samantha 'Sam' Byrne.

=== Plot ===
Gears of War 3 begins when Chairman Prescott unexpectedly arrives on the CNV Sovereign. Prescott informs Marcus Fenix he needs to relay important information to the ship's senior officer, Captain Michaelson. The Lambent launch a surprise attack on the ship, which leaves Michaelson dead and Prescott mortally wounded. Before dying, Prescott gives Marcus an encryption to the disc that Colonel Hoffman stole and reveals that his father, Adam Fenix, is still alive. Adam is captive on Azura, a secret COG base, that is now occupied by Queen Myrrah of the Locust. Marcus, Dom, Cole, and Baird fight their way to the Anvil Gate Fortress, where Hoffman possesses the necessary equipment to decrypt Prescott's disc. The contents of the disc reveal that Azura is an island bunker protected by an artificial hurricane, making the island only accessible by submarine.

Hoffman believes there should be submarines at the Endeavor Naval Shipyard in Halvo Bay, but it requires Imulsion to fuel it. Dom suggests they detour to Mercy, an Imulsion township. There, they discover that humans are becoming Lambent. During extraction, the Gears are nearly overrun by Locust and Lambent forces. Dom sacrifices himself with an explosion that wipes them out. Demoralized, they are forced to continue their search for fuel in the city of Char after their truck runs out of fuel. The ruined city is inhabited by several Stranded civilians led by Aaron Griffin (voiced by Ice-T). Despite his dislike for the COG, Griffin reluctantly tasks Marcus to recover a supply of Imulsion. After acquiring the fuel, they are attacked by Myrrah's forces. Griffin's people sustain heavy casualties in the ensuing battle, but the Gears are ultimately able to escape with the fuel. They reach the shipyard where Myrrah's forces are stationed. They defeat the Locust and prepare their submarine.

Delta arrives at Azura, discovering that it's a luxury bunker for Sera's most elite and powerful individuals. Adam contacts them and reveals he is being held captive atop Azura's main hotel tower. Delta shuts down the maelstrom barrier and ensues the final battle. After fighting through waves of Locust and Lambent, Marcus is reunited with his father. Adam explains that Imulsion is a living organism, a parasite, similar to fungus. He worked with Myrrah prior to Emergence Day on trying to stop the Lambent in order to keep the Locust underground, but he ran out of time. Since then, he created the Imulsion countermeasure, a targeted-radiation weapon aimed at killing all living cells colonized by Imulsion. Marcus and his squad protect Adam from the Lambent and Myrrah's forces. As the Imulsion countermeasure is activated, Adam reveals that he had to infect himself with Imulsion in order to test his machine, which causes him to disintegrate. Myrrah, who survived the final attack, insults Adam and mocks Marcus's grief before he kills her with Dom's commando knife.

Meanwhile, the machine emits a radiation wave that sweeps across Sera. Humans claim victory as the Lambent disintegrates into dust, Sera's Imulsion is destroyed, and the Locust are seemingly killed as their bodies become crystallized from the Imulsion that resided in their cells. During the celebrations, Marcus mournfully wonders what humanity has left. He is comforted by Anya, who assures Marcus that the sacrifices of Adam, Dom, and their comrades have guaranteed humanity a future.

=== RAAM's Shadow ===
A DLC acting as a secondary single player campaign to Gears of War 3, the player takes control of both General RAAM, the Locust's main General, and Michael Barrick of Zeta-Six from the Gears of War comic series set during the Evacuation of Ilima several years before the first Gears of War game. Other major characters include Lieutenant Minh Young Kim from Gears of War, Tai Kailso from Gears of War 2, new character Alicia Valera and Jace Stratton from the comics and Gears of War 3. The main setting, the COG city of Ilima, previously briefly appeared in Gears of War 2 as ruins.

The surviving COG city of Ilima is besieged by a coming Kryllstorm, a mass of millions of Kryll that will devour everything in their path once the city is dark enough. To speed up the Kryllstorm, Locust General RAAM leads an elite unit throughout Ilima, decimating COG resistance and summoning Seeders to black out the sky faster. Throughout the battle, RAAM is instructed by Queen Myrrah who sees taking Ilima as a stepping stone towards reaching the COG capital city of Ephyra.

At the same time, Zeta-Six is assigned to help evacuate Ilima via convoys of APCs, only to have their checkpoint attacked by massive Locust forces. Repelling multiple waves, Zeta ultimately uses the Hammer of Dawn to finish off the attacking Locust and is reassigned to help another squad defending a bank with civilian survivors inside. Zeta fails to save the other Gears and most of the civilians, but discovers a young Jace Stratton holed up inside of the bank's vault. The squad rescues Jace and escorts him to a convoy for evacuation, killing several Seeders and a Brumak to protect the convoy. At Jace's request, Zeta agrees to check out the local high school where Jace believes that there might be more survivors, including his adoptive father Dr. Wisen.

Reaching the high school, Zeta finds it to be a COG evacuation center which has been overrun by the Locust, including a Berserker, packs of Wretches and several giant Serapedes. However, they overhear a message from Dr. Wisen directing the survivors of the attack on the school to retreat to his nearby orphanage. Zeta fights their way back outside, managing to kill the Berserker by using several exploding cars in the parking lot. Finding their comms blocked by the Seeders and with time running out, Zeta fights their way to city hall where Barrick uses the mobile command center located there to take control of the Hammer of Dawn and kill the Seeders. With communications restored and less than half an hour left until the city is consumed, Zeta contacts Command who reveals that they are the only COG forces left in the city. As Kim refuses to abandon the survivors at the orphanage, Command agrees to redirect the last APC to meet them there for evacuation.

At the orphanage, Zeta discovers several survivors, including Dr. Wisen. As the APC arrives, carrying Jace, General RAAM leads a personal attack on the survivors, killing Alicia Valera and destroying the APC. Jace joins the remaining Gears in fighting off the Locust, though they are quickly cut off from the others. Zeta and Jace fight their way back through the nearby streets and sewers, encountering and killing most of RAAM's elite unit, particularly the elite Theron Guard that had been acting as RAAM's second in command during the battle. Upon their return to the orphanage, the Gears and Jace face off against multiple waves of Locust led by RAAM himself from atop a Reaver and weaponizing the Kryll against them. The group manages to shoot down the Locust General's Reaver, but Barrick is forced to stop the vengeful Kim from making a suicidal attack on the trapped and injured RAAM. Retreating to the roof, the survivors are evacuated by a King Raven helicopter just before the Kryllstorm completely engulfs Ilima. Impressed with Jace, Barrick commends the young man's courage and states that he will make a great Gear in the future.

== Development ==
=== Stereoscopic 3D support ===
Gears of War 3 includes a stereoscopic mode for 3DTV sets. It uses TriOviz for Games Technology, which is integrated with Unreal Engine 3, for stereoscopic 3D support. All Gears of War 3 gameplay and cinematics have S3D support, and this extends to split-screen play as well.

=== Multiplayer beta ===
On December 17, 2010, Epic Games confirmed that the Epic Edition of Bulletstorm for the Xbox 360 included early access to the multiplayer beta of Gears of War 3 and access to exclusive content. It was later announced that pre-ordering Gears of War 3 in any edition at GameStop in the United States or GAME in the United Kingdom would grant access to the public beta. The Gears of War 3 exclusive beta began on April 18, 2011, a week before the GameStop pre-order beta which began on April 25, 2011. There was in-game content unlockable exclusively for beta testers that included characters and weapon skins. All players that participated in the beta received a medal to identify themselves as beta testers upon the release of the final game. The beta concluded on May 15, 2011.

=== PlayStation 3 leaked footage ===
In 2017 and later in 2020, footage of Gears of War 3 running on a PlayStation 3 surfaced. The footage was confirmed to be legitimate and appeared to be from a data breach Epic had suffered in 2011, but Kotaku confirmed with Epic Games that the source of the footage was not from an unannounced port of the game to the PlayStation 3, but was from a test of the Unreal Engine. Epic called the software "a byproduct of Epic’s internal Unreal Engine 3 testing process, which utilized both Gears and Unreal Tournament, and was never part of any actual product work for PlayStation 3."

== Marketing and release ==
According to Tim Sweeney, Gears of War 3 cost between $48,000,000 and $60,000,000 to develop. The game was officially unveiled on Late Night with Jimmy Fallon by Cliff Bleszinski, with a teaser trailer featuring the song "Heron Blue" by Sun Kil Moon. Prior to the official reveal, an advert for the game was accidentally displayed on the Xbox 360 Dashboard.

=== Retail editions ===
The game was available for pre-order in three retail editions: "Standard", "Limited", and "Epic". The game also has special character variants based on where the game was pre-ordered. Confirmed variants include Mechanic Baird, Commando Dom, Savage Grenadier Elite, and Savage Kantus. On May 23, 2011, Epic Games confirmed that an exclusive replica Retro Lancer designed by NECA would be available exclusively at GameStop, while a gold version of the replica Retro Lancer is also available exclusively at Play.com.

- The standard version contains the game, a cut-down manual, and a sheet of Gears of War 3 themed decals.
- The Limited Edition contains an Octus Award Box with the Octus Service Medal awarded to Dr. Adam Fenix, exclusive Adam Fenix playable character for multiplayer, fabric COG flag, and the personal effects of Dr. Adam Fenix such as his Last Will and Testament, Hammer of Dawn schematics and Fenix family mementos.
- The Epic Edition includes everything from the Limited Edition as well as a Marcus Fenix statue, a 96-page book about the game's art and design, and the Infected Omen Weapon Pack that includes skins for the Lancer, Hammerburst, Retro Lancer, Sawed Off Shotgun and Gnasher Shotgun.
- The Gears of War 3 Limited Edition Xbox 360 console included a customized red console with the 'Infected Omen' design, two Special Edition Gears of War 3 wireless controllers, a 320GB hard drive, and two tokens to unlock Adam Fenix and the Infected Omen Weapon Pack.

=== Fate of Carmine voting campaign ===
Clayton Carmine, brother of Anthony and Benjamin, of the previous two games, appears in Gears of War 3. Carmine is more competent, witty, and muscular in the third game, with tattoos of his brothers and the reasons they died on his arms (Keep your head down! and Practice reloading!). He was shown wielding a Mulcher machine gun in several released pictures from the game. A vote was held between July 29, 2010, and September 6, 2010, to determine whether Carmine would live or die based on sales of Xbox avatar T-shirts available for purchase on Xbox Live; Epic had developed endings reflecting either choice prior to the conclusion of the vote. Additionally, actual T-shirts were available from San Diego Comic-Con with all purchases. The voting campaign raised over $150,000, which was all donated to Child's Play.

=== Collaboration with Ice-T ===
Ice-T voices the character of Griffin. It was announced during E3 2011 that Ice-T's band, Body Count, would be reuniting to make a song titled "The Gears of War", which was featured in the Horde 2.0 trailer.

=== Unlockables ===
Cliff Bleszinski announced via Twitter that Gears of War 3 would have unlockables just like Gears of War 2.

- On April 1, 2011, Bleszinski announced as an April Fools' joke via Twitter that Gears of War 3 would have a new unlockable weapon in the form of a 6 barrelled shotgun that has a special ability to shoot nukes. The beta had exclusive unlockables, such as a Golden Retro Lancer by completing 90 matches in any game type, and earning 100 kills with it will unlock it for use in the full game. Players who purchased the Bulletstorm Epic Edition unlocked an exclusive Flaming Hammerburst for use in the beta and the full game.
- Epic announced that players must hold on to their beta saved file for their unlockables to appear in the full game. It was also confirmed on June 24, 2011, that completing required achievements from Gears of War and Gears of War 2 will earn the player new weapon skins and medals in Gears of War 3.
- The Gold Lancer and Hammerburst have been confirmed as returning from Gears of War 2 to Gears of War 3. Rod Fergusson announced that players with the Veteran Gear achievement from Gears of War 2 will earn an in-game Old Guard medal and callsign as well as gold variants of all five starting weapons. There was a method to obtain all five gold weapons without the achievement, but after listening to negative fan feed back, they have since made the golden Gnasher shotgun exclusive to Veteran Gear players.
- Chrome weapon skins for the five starting weapons have also been confirmed to be unlockable by playing the Xbox 360 or PC version of Gears of War and Gears of War 2.
- It was confirmed by Rod Fergusson that the player would earn the green liquid metal skin in a special marketing promotion for Jack in the Box.
- People who watched the Mission: Impossible – Ghost Protocol trailer on Xbox Live and then completed Gears of War 3 on Insane Difficulty by December 25, 2011, either in single or multiplayer mode unlocked an exclusive Mission: Impossible — Ghost Protocol Weapon Skin Pack. This pack comes with weapon skins for the Lancer, Retro Lancer, Hammerburst, Gnasher and Sawed-off Shotgun. Those that had already completed the game on Insane would automatically receive the pack on December 31.

=== Gears of War 3 trike ===
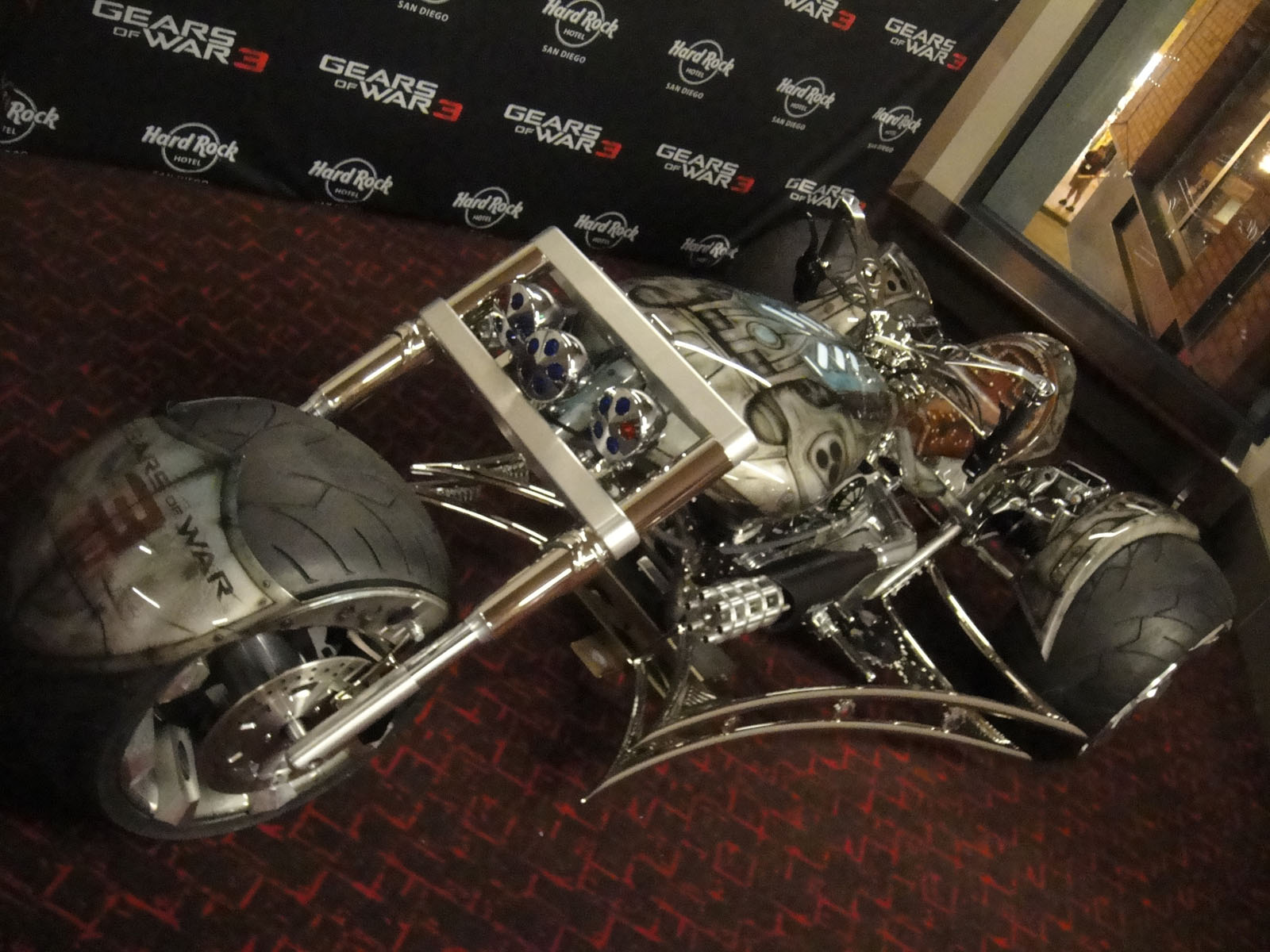
The Gears of War 3 trike at the 2011 San Diego Comic-Con

At San Diego Comic-Con, Paul Jr. Designs aka "PJD", the company of Paul Teutul Jr. from the Discovery series American Chopper, revealed their commissioned Gears of War trike. Discovery episodes chronicled their efforts to build the trike, visits to Epic and them interpreting various merchandising and promotional material into the bike. The team from Epic was impressed and even mentioned the possibility of adding the trike to a future game in the series.

=== Downloadable content ===
On 29 August 2011, Microsoft and Epic Games announced a "Gears of War 3 Season Pass" that entitles gamers to the first four installments of downloadable content (at a discount) that will roll out over the course of the next year, with the first releasing in November 2011. Previous characters in the series, including Tai and RAAM, will be future downloadable content characters. It has also been confirmed that Story DLC will be available after launch, and that the regular cast of Gears of War will not be in future DLC.

The first downloadable content is the Horde Command Pack, which was released on November 1, 2011. In addition to new character and weapon skins, it provides three new maps for use in Versus and Horde mode and three new fortifications that the players can build.

The second downloadable content is called the Versus Booster Map Pack. It was released on November 24, 2011, and is available for free. The pack contains five multiplayer maps which includes "Blood Drive", "Azura", and "Rustlung", which were originally made available through the Horde Command Pack; and Bullet Marsh and Clocktower, which will be new to Gears of War 3.

The third downloadable content is RAAM's Shadow. The expansion was released on December 13, 2011. It includes four new multiplayer characters, a new weapon set named "Chocolate", new achievements, and over 3 hours of singleplayer gameplay. The story takes place before the first Gears of War, set in Sera post-emergence day. Zeta Squad is enlisted to evacuate Ilima City and protect the citizens against a Locust Kryll storm. The player will be in the role of General RAAM, the main antagonist from the first Gears of War. Zeta is led by Michael Barrick (from "Gears of War" comics fame) and composed of returning characters such as Lt. Minh Young Kim, from the first Gears of War and Tai Kaliso from Gears of War 2, Jace Stratton from Gears of War 3 and also includes a new female character, Alicia Valera. The primary setting is the city of Illima from Gears of War 2.

The fourth downloadable content is entitled Fenix Rising, and it was released on January 17, 2012. The DLC includes five new multiplayer maps and also introduced four new character skins and a new system that allows players to rank up through level 100 multiple times.

The fifth and final downloadable content, entitled Forces of Nature, was released on March 27, 2012. The map pack is based around weather and natural disasters and consists of three new multiplayer maps ("Aftermath", "Artillery", and "Cove"), as well as remade versions of "Jacinto" and "Raven Down". On top of the new maps, the DLC also includes four new character models, five weapon skins ready to use immediately, and two unlockable weapon skins. New Easter-egg type weapons, Elemental Cleavers, are introduced.

== Reception ==
=== Critical reception ===
Reception

Aggregate scores
Aggregator	Score
GameRankings	91.49%
Metacritic	91/100

Review scores
Publication	Score
Computer and Video Games	9/10
Destructoid	8/10
Eurogamer	8/10
Famitsu	39/40
Game Informer	9.5/10
GameRevolution	4.5/5
GameSpot	9.5/10
GameZone	9/10
Giant Bomb	5/5
IGN	9/10
Joystiq	5/5
Official Xbox Magazine (US)	10/10
The Guardian	5/5
The Daily Telegraph	4/5
PC Advisor	4.5/5

Upon release, Gears of War 3 received critical acclaim, garnering an aggregate score of 91.49% on GameRankings and 91/100 on Metacritic. Jeff Gerstmann of Giant Bomb gave Gears of War 3 a review of 5 out of 5 stars; stating "Gears of War 3 is a fantastic follow-up that answers important questions about the nature of the Gears universe while backing it all up with an even bigger, better multiplayer suite." IGN called it "the spectacular conclusion to one of the most memorable and celebrated sagas in video games." Game Informer gave it a 9.5/10, saying that "Gears 3 is a fantastic idea polished to near perfection by an enormous crew of talented developers and a bottomless budget," with "a constantly shuffling deck of threats that encourage players to experiment with new weapons and tactics," "hilariously over-the-top set piece moments," and a "smart approach to network play."

After Eurogamer published an 8/10 review for the game, Epic Games' Cliff Bleszinski reported, saying "When people rated [Gears of War 2] higher than [Gears of War 3], it kind of upset me because I know [Gears of 3] is a better game on every level." His comments were criticized by Destructoid and GamePro. In GamePro, McKinley Noble argued that "slamming a 'bad' review that's actually pretty favorable does come off as selfish".

=== Sales ===
Gears of War 3 received more than one million pre-orders. The game sold more than 3 million copies during its first week—higher than the previous two Gears of War entries. In the United States, it was the second-best selling game only behind Madden NFL 12 during its launch month, and overall the seventh best-selling game of 2011.

=== Awards ===
- IGN: Best Action and Shooter Game (2011)
- G4: Best Xbox 360 Game and Shooter (2011)
- Game Informer: Best Cooperative Mode (2011)
- GameSpot: Best Shooter (2011)

During the 15th Annual Interactive Achievement Awards, the Academy of Interactive Arts & Sciences nominated Gears of War 3 for "Action Game of the Year" and "Outstanding Achievement in Online Gameplay".
