= Dream Chronicles: The Book of Water =

2011 video game

- Steam header for The Book of Water
- Developer: KatGames
- Publisher: PlayFirst
- Director: Miguel Tartaj
- Producer: Aaron Norstad
- Designer: Miguel Tartaj
- Programmers: David Gonzalez; Miguel Angel Linan; Raul Buissn Esporrin
- Artists: Pablo Vietto; 3dBrigade
- Writers: Michelle Woods; Devin Grayson
- Composer: Adam Gubman
- Series: Dream Chronicles
- Engine: Playground SDK
- Platforms: Microsoft Windows macOS iOS
- Release: April 24, 2011: PC/Mac, Collector's April 24, 2011 PC/Mac, Standard May 27, 2011 iOS, Standard August 31, 2011
- Genres: Adventure, puzzle
- Mode: Single-player

Dream Chronicles: The Book of Water (often shortened to Dream Chronicles 5 or The Book of Water) is a 2011 adventure and puzzle casual game developed by KatGames and originally published by PlayFirst. It is the fifth installment in the Dream Chronicles series, the fourth sequel to 2007's Dream Chronicles, and the middle part of the second unfinished trilogy titled Lyra's Destiny.

Set in a mystical world of realistic fantasy where mortal and fairy realms collide, continuing the story from where Dream Chronicles: The Book of Air ended, The Book of Water tells the strange journey of an extraordinary girl named Lyra who has found her way home only to discover that the Fairy Queen of Dreams—her family's biggest rival—has cast a menacing storm over all of her beloved Town of Wish. The town is completely desolate, her mother is missing, and her father is gravely ill, forcing her to embark on a quest to counter the evil spell and seek answers to save her family and hometown. The game includes both new and returning characters and locations from the previous games.

The Book of Water was first presented limitedly as a beta version in December 2010, and later the following month on January 18. Just two days before the game's scheduled release, the content was leaked online. It was released worldwide as a digital download under two editions, Collector's and Standard—on April 24 and May 27, respectively—by PlayFirst. Each edition was quickly available on PlayFirst's exclusive partner, Big Fish Games, on the following day of each release date. Both editions feature the main single-mode game, while the Collector's one also includes a bonus game in which players can play as Faye, three extra locations, several mini-puzzles, eight wallpapers, and a detailed walkthrough from the developer. A high-definition version of this game was available via App Store for iPad device in August the same year.

Similar to the fourth game, it was met with mixed reviews from casual game critics, describing it as "a pure point-and-click adventure experience of the old Myst school of gameplay, with some minor hidden object elements mixed in", though they heavily criticized it for "[having] let the [Dream Chronicles] franchise down" and for being short, dull, uninteresting, and ending terribly, which is "bound to leave a bad taste in your mouth". The game itself was moderately successful, and reached the top-ten of the charts in most major casual game charts, but failed to attain the top position in any of them. It only reached the top of the iWin.com's Top 100 Games and Shockwave.com's Top Download Games chart. Compared to other games in the series, it is the lowest charting and reviewed Dream Chronicles game to date. The Book of Water was preceded by Dream Chronicles: The Book of Air (2010).

As PlayFirst had initially announced and The Book of Water's final scenes implied, there would be a sequel called Dream Chronicles: The Book of Fire to be released, but soon after The Book of Water was released, since July 2011, PlayFirst cancelled releasing casual games on PC/Mac platforms in order to focus on its growing mobile gaming market. Because PlayFirst holds the rights to publish the Dream Chronicles series, that forced its developer KatGames to move on with other projects, namely The Cross Formula, a Dream Chronicles-alike game that was released in early 2012. Partly due to that cancellation, The Book of Water was cut short its development time, thus making itself felt unfinished and awkward; it was also the last collaboration between PlayFirst and KatGames, and The Book of Fire will not be developed and released.

== Gameplay ==
Dream Chronicles: The Book of Water is structured much like Dream Chronicles: The Book of Air and other games in the series with some minor twists. There are not so many improvements in gameplay overall compared to other Dream Chronicles games. It is more of a quest-like adventure than a traditional hidden object game, a mixing of adventure and puzzle game. Featuring loads of puzzles and logical quests with different difficulties, the puzzles in The Book of Water are well-tricky and tightly blended with the story, which is a typical feature of quest or click-and-point games. There are no lists of items to find but a huge amount of inventory based puzzles, logical riddles and quests to solve, which have been scattered through the locations in the game. The objects that players find may be used in a scene other than the one they found it in. Objects will stay in inventory until players need to use them. All objects that players are able to pick up will serve a purpose, whether they are used in that scene or not. A lot of times in this game the pieces players pick up may only be used as they get to the next scene. Some items may not become visible in a scene right away, and the players must perform other tasks first before they become visible.

The hint system is much more evolved and enhanced than all of previous Dream Chronicles games. Players can use "Locator" button on the left edge to highlight objects that they can pick up, including Dream Pieces. The "Locator" needs to be fully charged to work, and it will charge up over time, but if there are not any, the power of hints is not used. Some puzzles have a skip button available, and the players have to wait until it is filled to use it. There is also a help system at players' disposal. By clicking on this button, players will be revealed a hint or objective in a board. The hint or objective disappears from the board when is achieved. The notable feature, which is only featured in the Collector's Edition of the game, is that players can play as Faye in the bonus chapter, besides playing as the main character Lyra. The bonus chapter is a prequel to Lyra's journey in The Book of Water and is set shortly before Lyra's story begins.

Like the previous game The Book of Air, The Book of Water has Dream Jewels that come with four special powers (one ability was lifted compared to the fourth game). They can be used to light up a dark place ("Illuminate"), reconstruct objects of things broken apart in pieces ("Weld"), reveal invisible things or secret ("Reveal"), and permits seeing someone Lyra love that is far away ("Vision"). In order to activate Dream Jewels, players need to fill them with Dream Pieces which are thrown throughout. At the end of the game, players earn an overall high score. The faster how players can complete the game, the more Dream Jewels and Dream Pieces they can find, and the fewer times they skip puzzles, the better score they will earn. When players play again under the same name, some of the key items themselves will be in different places the second times around.

== Synopsis ==
=== Setting ===
The Barge City is an enchanting fishing village built over the water and the home of many fishermen and merchants.

Dream Chronicles: The Book of Water spans several distinct areas that can be traveled to by airship whenever players click the destinations on the in-game map. There are 24 main scenes and nine large areas featured in the game:

- The Village of Wish: This is the tiny town of Wish, where Lyra lives with her parents, Fidget and Faye, and her grandparents, Tangle and Aeval. It is an insular place, far from cities and civilization. The town is surrounded by tall walls, not to keep the residents inside, for they have no desire to leave the safety and warmth of their community. The walls are there to keep the outside world outside, and are secured with complex weighted locks first seen in Dream Chronicles. The streets are cobbled, lined with colorful dwellings and stores. Beyond the walls of Wish lie lush forests and winding roads that, eventually, lead to other larger towns, but the folk of Wish have little desire to visit those distant places. Their homes are secured in their beloved village where, they believe, no harm can come to them.
- The Herbalist's House: The herbalist is a mortal who acquired fairy knowledge and experimented with potions from various plants. Known for his expertise in potion-making, the Herbalist has recipes for powerful magical concoctions.
- The Barge City: An enchanting fishing village built over the water, well south of the Village of Wish, it is the home of many fishermen and merchants, and where houses float on water, connected by wooden boardwalks.
- The Obelisk: This imposing structure holds a magical figurine inside, but it is not easy to access or open. This is also an arid and quiet place, in the middle of the desert, but people must still live in those houses carved into the rocks.
- Merrow's Cottage: Merrow is an inventor who left the fairy realm, but took one of the mystic figurines with him. He keeps it locked up with a special magic gramophone. Merrow's cottage was once a sanctuary for fairies escaping into the mortal realm.
- The Clockmaker's House: A distant frozen tundra from where the Clockmaker, a powerful if solitary fairy, synchronizes time both in the mortal and fairy worlds. The low temperatures at the Clockmaker's House are useful for slowing any clocks that might consider racing ahead. The eternal snow keeps the Clockmaker's parts pristine. No plants grow in his frozen wasteland but long ago Aeval brought him flowers from a more hospitable clime, and their image is now pressed into various pieces throughout the Clockmaker's domain.
- The Crater of Time: This barren area holds the seven magic symbols needed to stop the Eternal Storm spell. They are locked inside seven mysterious caves.
- The Nexus Gateway: The transportation hub that fairies use to travel quickly from the fairy realm to the mortal realm. In The Book of Water, the Nexus only appeared in the bonus chapter, and connects to the Herbalist's house.
- The Observatory: The magic telescope is used to convert constellations into molds. Molds are used in the Forge to create Dream Jewels to open new places in the Nexus Gateway in Dream Chronicles: The Chosen Child, or to create magical figurines in The Book of Water.

=== Plot ===
Faye is writing notes for her daughter Lyra before leaving to find a cure for her husband Fidget.

An 18-year-old half-fairy half-mortal girl named Lyra had a strange dream in which she could not seem to wake. A man called the Clockmaker sent her searching through a strange, unearthly realm to find golden keys and return them to the Crater of Time. Now Lyra had found her way home but as she approached her beloved Town of Wish, she found it beset by a terrible storm. Waking up from this dream, Lyra soon realizes her real-life situation, and lands her airship from the storm safely. Entering the Town of Wish, Lyra finds out that her hometown is completely isolate as everyone has left. She enters her house, and sees her father Fidget lying terribly ill on the sofa. Lyra picks up the note left by her mother Faye, and surprisingly discovers that her family's biggest rival, the Fairy Queen of Dreams named Lilith, came to Lyra's house with her 10-year-old son, Kenrick. After having been disappeared for 10 years, Lilith returned to look for a magic item called "The Book of Water". Fidget managed to send it away to the Barge City, while her fairy grandfather Tangle was distracting them. To punish Fidget, Lilith cast a spell funneling his life essence into the Eternal Storm, which forced Faye to travel to the Herbalist's House to find a magical cure potion for him. Although fairies cannot kill, Kenrick is half-fairy half-mortal like Lyra. At Lilith's behest, he destroyed Tangle, and Lyra's fairy grandmother Aeval has gone to bury him in the Eternal Maze. Desperate and angry, Lyra tries to find a cure for her father only to make the situation worse. At the last attempt, Lyra travels to the Barge City in hoping of finding the missing mother, a cure for father, and a way to keep "The Book of Water" from falling into Lilith's hands.

After traveling to the Barge City, retrieving and using the Book of Water, Lyra learns that the Eternal Storm spell can be stopped by the seven magic signs of the Crater of Time. She can find the seven signs inside the seven caves of the Crater, only if she has the seven corresponding mystic figurines. Three of these figurines are no longer missing as Faye has forged replacements for them, and The Book of Water reveals the locations of other four figurines for Lyra. The first figurine is in the water at the center of Barge City, and Lyra must use a magic fishing pole to fish it out. The second figurine is hidden inside the Obelisk, behind some cryptic symbols that Lyra must decipher. The third figurine was taken long ago by a fairy named Merrow, and he locked it up in his magical gramophone. The Clockmaker knows where the fourth figurine is, and he might share that secret for the right price. The last unicorn figurine is buried in the field next to the Herbalist's House. Lyra enters the field and digs to find a chest. After retrieving all of seven magic signs in the Crater of Time, Lyra returns to Wish to place them on the Lilith's statue, and banishes the thunder and lightning. The rain has stopped, Fidget's strength is returning, but Faye is missing and nowhere to be found now.

In the bonus chapter, players play as Faye in the prequel to Lyra's journey in The Book of Water to find out what happened just moments before Lyra's story began. Faye hears Lilith's voice once again, then day instantly turns into night. She feels unconscious, and has a nightmare of Lilith and Kenrick. Faye breaks free from the dream, as she did 10 years before, but cannot wake her husband Fidget. Lilith is after them again, and Faye has to find out the reason why. With the help of the plants, Faye's mother-in-law Aeval guides her to the Herbalist's House to make a cure potion for Fidget. Faye mixes the potion, but Aeval sends her a warning through the plants that a potion to break a water spell can sometimes kill, not heal. Then Aeval guides her to board a boat to Barge City, and Faye is told to reforge three of seven figurines by using three lens hidden here. Three figurines are needed to be forged at the Nexus gateway, as Faye returns to the Herbalist to enter it. Faye forges three figurines, and they work well in the Crater of Time, but something does not seem right. Just as Faye has completed the third one, Lilith transports her to a strange, unknown Prison of Fire.

== Development ==
The Book of Water takes the story to darker places in which not any other Dream Chronicles game has ventured.

One month before Dream Chronicles: The Book of Water was released, the publisher PlayFirst's blog, Inside PlayFirst, uploaded a blog post including a video depicting the developer KatGames' offices where Dream Chronicles series has been made. The exclusive video tour was specially made for PlayFirst's Local Fan Day in which they invited fans to their office for the launch of Dream Chronicles: The Book of Air.

The story of The Book of Water is darker than other Dream Chronicles games. Game producer Aaron Norstad explained: "That isn't to say it is overtly dark in theme, but there was a goal to move this chapter in a direction that is a little more serious in the events that transpire in the mystical fairy realm within the Dream Chronicles world". Making this installment was different from the previous ones. While the developer KatGames had already planned for some things while making The Book of Air, they were faced with a new challenge of making the Collector's Edition extra special. The developers eventually added a prequel storyline for the Collector's Edition, where the players play as Faye.

Some exclusive concept artworks for The Book of Water were released on Inside PlayFirst, which include: The Toy Shop, and Lyra's House in the Town of Wish; the Herbalist's Garden; the crash shot outside of Wish at the beginning of the game; the Prison of Fire (the last scene of the Collector's Edition's bonus game), and some other minor items from the game.

== Release and post-release ==
Dream Chronicles: The Book of Water was first presented limitedly as a beta version in December 2010 for the publisher PlayFirst's beta players, and later the following month on January 18. On April 22, just two days before the game's scheduled release, the full game was leaked online. On the same day, The Book of Water's teaser trailer was posted on Dream Chronicles fan page on Facebook, and on PlayFirst's YouTube profile.

It was officially first released as Collector's Edition digitally on April 24 by PlayFirst. The Standard Edition was released a month later on May 27. Each edition was quickly available on PlayFirst's exclusive partner, Big Fish Games, on the following day of each release date. Both editions feature the main single-mode game, while the Collector's one also includes a special bonus game in which players can play as Faye to find out what happened to the Town of Wish before Lyra's story starts, three extra locations, several mini-puzzles, eight wallpapers, and a detailed walkthrough from the developer. These extra features (excluding the bonus game) were released exclusively as a stand-alone piece, Dream Chronicles: The Book of Water Strategy Guide, along with the release of the Standard Edition on Big Fish Games on May 28.

The game itself was moderately successful, and reached the top-ten of the charts in most major casual game charts, but failed to attain the top position in any of them. It only reached the top of the iWin.com's Top 100 Games and Shockwave.com's Top Download Games chart, while peaking number-two on Big Fish Games, GameHouse, and Pogo.com; number-four on PlayFirst, and number-five on Amazon.com. Compared to other games in the series, it is the least successful and the lowest charting Dream Chronicles game to date.

In August 2011, a high-definition version of this game was available via App Store for iPad device, and the latest version was updated in November 2012.

=== Reception ===
Reception

Review scores
Publication	Score
Adventure Gamers	2/5
Gamezebo	2/5
Jay Is Games	(favorable)

Like the fourth game, it received mixed reviews from casual game critics. Positive reviews described the game as "a pure point-and-click adventure experience of the old Myst school of gameplay, with some minor hidden object elements mixed in", while negative reviews criticized it heavily for "[having] let the [Dream Chronicles] franchise down" and being "short, dull and uninteresting and its terrible ending is bound to leave a bad taste in your mouth".

The first (and the only positive) review came from Grinnyp, an editor of Jay Is Games, in which she opened her review by stating: "The Dream Chronicles series of point-and-click adventures [...] manages to capture within its gameplay both the beauty and the danger whereof we dream". She also felt that the developer's decision of reusing scenes in the game was much of the fun, and was a nostalgic look back. Grinnyp concluded her review, and further declared: "Stunning to look at, a joy to listen to (the soundtrack is lovely as always), challenging, entertaining, and downright fun, Dream Chronicles: The Book of Water is a worthy successor to those games that have come before, while setting the stage for the (hopefully) big wrap-up that is to come".

Meanwhile, Neilie Johnson spent most time in his The Book of Water review to explain the reason why Dream Chronicles series had "evolved into one of the most successful casual game franchises in existence and no wonder". He gave the game 2 stars out of 5, and said: "After half an hour or so, you'll realize the game looks familiar. Too familiar, and for very good reason. [...] Despite the recycling of gameplay and art, the game is very short [...] and worse, has an abrupt, cliffhanger ending". Feeling the bonus game was just as repetitive and uncreative as the main one, Neilie cited: "Post-ending, the pain still doesn't end since there's a half-baked bonus chapter wherein you play as Faye, doing all the things Lyra envisioned her doing during the first part of the adventure. [...] And just when you thought things just couldn't get any crummier, the bonus chapter also ends on an abrupt, insultingly unfinished cliffhanger".

Adventure Gamers continued their negative streak at Dream Chronicles series by gave The Book of Water 2 stars out of 5. The main critical consensus is: "The fifth casual adventure installment looks as beautiful as ever, but the well of creativity and substance has run dry". The reviewer, Merlina McGovern, praised the game's gorgeous art and animations and some beautifully rendered puzzles, while criticized its short game length, flimsy story, easy and repetitive puzzles; some seemingly unfinished elements hint at a more substantial adventure; and far too many recycled locations. After all, they verdict: "Without either a fully fleshed-out story or substantial puzzles, The Book of Water’s beautiful series of images is just an ephemeral mirage".

As PlayFirst had initially announced and The Book of Water's final scenes implied, there would be a sequel called Dream Chronicles: The Book of Fire to be released, but soon after The Book of Water was released, since July 2011, PlayFirst cancelled releasing casual games on PC/Mac platforms in order to focus on its growing mobile gaming market. Because PlayFirst hold the Dream Chronicles trademarks, KatGames must have their approval in order to develop a new sequel, thus KatGames had to move on with other projects. Due to that cancellation, The Book of Fire will not be developed and released, and The Book of Water was the last collaboration between PlayFirst and KatGames. Furthermore, due to that early cancellation, the game's development time was cut short to fit PlayFirst's game schedule. KatGames had to reuse several previous games' scenes, background music, and sound effects. The animation was not designed in 3D as KatGames did in previous games. Some puzzles were also cut short and lacked difficulty towards the end and even the same voice-over was used for both Lyra and Faye; thus overall making The Book of Water felt unfinished and simplistic.
