= Dream Chronicles 2: The Eternal Maze =

2008 video game

- Steam header for Dream Chronicles 2
- Developer: KatGames
- Publisher: PlayFirst
- Director: Miguel Tartaj
- Producer: Angel Inokon
- Designer: Miguel Tartaj
- Programmers: David Gonzalez; Miguel Angel Linan
- Artists: Pablo Vietto; 3dBrigade; Bon Art Studio
- Writers: Eleanor Burian-Mohr; Michelle Woods; Alexei Othenin-Girard; Cornerstore Entertainment
- Composer: Adam Gubman
- Series: Dream Chronicles
- Engine: Playground SDK
- Platforms: Microsoft Windows macOS iOS
- Release: February 14, 2008: PC/Mac, Standard February 14, 2008 Retail, Standard May 23, 2008 Retail, Bundled with Pt. 1 December 21, 2009 PC/Mac, Bundled with Pt. 1 & 3 September 3, 2010 iOS, Standard June 12, 2012
- Genres: Adventure, hidden object, puzzle
- Mode: Single-player

Dream Chronicles 2: The Eternal Maze (also known as Dream Chronicles: The Eternal Maze, and often shortened to Dream Chronicles 2 or The Eternal Maze) is a 2008 adventure, hidden object, and puzzle casual game developed by KatGames and originally published by PlayFirst. It is the first sequel to 2007's award-winning game Dream Chronicles, the second installment in the Dream Chronicles series, and the second part of the first trilogy called Faye's Journey.

The game is set in a mystical world of realistic fantasy where mortal and fairy realms collide, and picks up where the original Dream Chronicles ended. Dream Chronicles 2 tells the story of a mortal woman named Faye who wakes up from a powerful fairy's dream spell, and continues the quest to save her kidnapped fairy husband and imprisoned daughter. With the help of her mother-in-law, Faye travels deep into the Fairy Realm, where no mortal has ever entered, which contains many magical locks and puzzles. Upon solving them, the answers provide clues that help Faye to restore her family, and eventually unravels the mystery of the strange realm.

Dream Chronicles 2 was first presented limitedly as a beta version in December 2007. It was officially released worldwide as a digital download on February 14, 2008. Similar to its predecessor, Dream Chronicles 2 became a casual game hit soon after its initial release, reaching number-one of seven major casual game charts and peaking inside top ten on many other game charts. It was critically appreciated by casual game critics, with some called it "an endearing, intriguing and original quest, a fairy-tale that both enchants and entertains from beginning to end". It also won two awards, "Top Adventure Game of 2008" and "Best World Design", in the first annual RealArcade Great Games Awards held in mid-2009. Dream Chronicles 2 was preceded by the original Dream Chronicles (2007) and followed by Dream Chronicles: The Chosen Child (2009).

A high-definition version of this game was available via App Store for iPad device in June 2012.

== Gameplay ==
The gameplay in Dream Chronicles 2: The Eternal Maze is more involved than that in the original game. Whereas in the first Dream Chronicles players as Faye would solve one scene and then move on to the next level, in this game they may need to move between relative scenes in a separate area in order to progress. The objects that players find may be used in a scene other than the one they found it in. Objects will stay in inventory until players need to use them. All objects that players are able to pick up will serve a purpose, whether they are used in that scene or not. A lot of times in this game the pieces players pick up may only be used as they get to the next scene. Some items may not become visible in a scene right away, and the players must perform other tasks first before they become visible.

Each level becomes more complex as players advance through the game, and how players solve the puzzles will vary greatly. There are many puzzle types in game: logic puzzles, Simon-style memory games, jigsaw games, scramble words, and maze puzzles. If players are having difficulty with a level they can go back and reset the level and it will bring players back to the beginning of the closet area. This feature only appeared in Dream Chronicles 2. For the first time in the series, players can enjoy the experience of solving maze puzzles. The game contains two underground labyrinths, one in the 9th scene, and the other one in the 25th, last scene, but they are criticized for their highly difficult level, which prevents players from completing the whole game. Thus Dream Chronicles 2 is considered the most difficult game in the series.

Dream Jewels, previously a mere bonus for high scores, now have a function. Collecting these transparent gems and players are presented with a word scramble to unravel, one that offers clues to a future conundrum. Players will be asked a question and provided with a number of words. The task is to put all the words into a sentence, and after players find out the answer, they are given more detailed information on this question. Players can choose "Meditate Now" to tackle the poser right away or "Unlock Secret" in the diary to solve it later. There are 138 Dream Pieces molding eight Dream Jewels to complete in a given game, and 15 ones in total. Players need to replay the game several times before they can receive all the Dream Jewels. In order to activate these Jewels, players must find the Dream Pieces first.

In the end, players earn a high score. The faster how players can complete the game, the more Dream Pieces they can find, and the more Dream Jewels they can find and answer their mysteries, the better score they will earn. When players play again under the same name, they will have new Dream Jewel puzzles to solve, and some of the items will be in different locations.

== Synopsis ==
=== Setting ===
The Tower of Dreams holds all the knowledge, wisdom, history, and insights of the Fairy race.

There are 25 main scenes and six areas featured in the game. Once players access a new area, they cannot revisit the previous ones, though they can travel back-and-forth between locations within an area.

- The Forgotten Prison: There are 3 chambers in this prison. Fairies that fought the elements of nature were imprisoned here.
- The Ancients' Place: The birthplace of the Fairy race, Fairies have kept its location secret from mortals for thousands of years. It is protected by an impenetrable force field, making it an ideal spot for Lilith to imprison a mortal like Faye in Dream Chronicles 2.
- The Mortal Maze: A tunnel that leads from the Fairy Realm to the Mortal Realm.
- Merrow's Cottage: Merrow's cottage was once a sanctuary for Fairies escaping into the Mortal Realm.
- The Tower of Dreams: This tower holds all the knowledge, wisdom, history, and insights of the Fairies. Because of the value of its contents, it is guarded by five ancient Fairy Knights and each floor is protected by ingenious locks. The upper floor is where dreams can be made and observed.
- The Eternal Maze: As a final safeguard so that no mortal could ever enter or leave the Ancients' Place, the Fairies created an underground maze with no light, and no map. This made Fairy passage almost impossible as well, so some of the Fairies created a map to help them find their way between Realms.

=== Plot ===
Lilith is casting a dream spell by using her powerful crystal ball.

A mortal woman named Faye had a dream in which she was on the search for her fairy husband Fidget. The couple was almost united until the Fairy Queen of Dreams, Lilith, separated them. Lilith brought Fidget with her and transported Faye to a forgotten Fairy prison from which no mortal had ever escaped. Waking up from Lilith's dream spell, Faye soon realizes her situation, which makes her feel deeply confused. Fortunately, the Fairy Queen of Flora and Faye's mother-in-law, Aeval, appears and is able to communicate with Faye through magic plants, helping her daughter-in-law to find a way out. Escaping from the prison, Faye explores the Ancients' Place, known as the Fairy race's birthplace, where Fairies used to live a long time ago. She has to encounter numerous magical obstacles carefully arranged by Lilith, who still wants to prevent Faye from interfering with her plan to marry Fidget, and increase her own power through their union. Aeval looks into the nearest crystal ball, and informs Faye that her daughter Lyra is no longer sleeping in her bed: thus it is assumed that Lilith has taken her hostage. Aeval asks Faye to hurry on her way, because Fidget's hope of being rescued is fading, and he may succumb to marrying Lilith.

After roaming through the Mortals' Maze and reentering the Mortal Realm, Faye arrives at the cottage of one of Aeval's old Fairy friends, an eccentric inventor named Merrow. Faye eventually meets Merrow himself in his secret lab, and she is surprised to discover that he is a talking plant, another result of his scientific experiments. Merrow agrees to guide Faye to the Tower of Dreams where, according to him, Fidget and Lyra are being held hostage by Lilith. There is a strange tree growing outside the Tower, but Merrow dismisses it as unimportant. Faye does not keep the tree in mind, and instead enters the Tower - which no mortal had done before - without Merrow's help as he cannot enter. The Tower of Dreams was where the Fairy Lord's closest adviser, the Dream Librarian, lived and studied. That explains why each floor is locked with an ingenious magical puzzle: melodies, books, instruments, chess pieces, and statues.

Upon reaching the top floor, Faye finds a bed which reminds her of the one waiting back home in her Town of Wish. Having suffered many nightmares since her family was abducted, Faye feels exhausted, and tries to take a short nap, but as soon as she touches the bed, Aeval warns Faye that Merrow is a traitor, and that she must escape from this dangerous Tower. Faye jumps from the Tower's window and is then caught by Aeval's guided vines. Aeval leads Faye to the Eternal Tree, which turns out to be the one she had ignored at Merrow's advice before, and where Fidget and Lyra are thought to be being held. Faye enters the Tree, discovering in an underground chamber both a sleeping Fidget, and Lyra's favorite teddy bear. Aeval asks Faye to obtain a Root Potion from the Eternal Maze that could awaken Fidget. After Faye emerges from the Eternal Maze with the potion, the teddy bear vanishes. Faye gives the potion to Fidget, and the couple is finally reunited, but they must now find their missing daughter. In the extra cut-scene, after putting the book named Dream Chronicles: The Eternal Maze back on the bookshelf, Faye declares that finding Lyra is everything to her. Unless she finds Lyra, there would be an end to both her and Fidget.

== Release and post-release ==
Dream Chronicles 2: The Eternal Maze was first presented limitedly as a beta version in December 2007 for the publisher PlayFirst's players. It was officially released on February 14, 2008, by PlayFirst, and promoted: "With its attention to detail in storyline and gameplay, KatGames has built upon its initial work to deliver an expanded sequel - with longer gameplay, more puzzles and more depth - that will keep players even more firmly immersed than the spellbinding original". Following the successful footstep of the previous game, Dream Chronicles 2 instantly peaked at number-one on PlayFirst, Pogo.com, Shockwave, Reflexive Arcade, GameHouse, RealArcade and Zylom; number-two on Big Fish Games, SpinTop Games and Logler Global; number-three on iWin.com, Amazon.com and Mac Game Store; peaked inside top ten on Yahoo! Games, MSN Games, Alawar Games and other major casual game charts.

A high-definition version of this game was available via App Store for iPad device in June 2012, and the latest version was updated in November the same year.

=== Reception ===
Reception

Review scores
Publication	Score
Adventure Gamers	3/5
Gamezebo	4.5/5
Jay Is Games	(favorable)

Awards
Publication	Award
	"Top Adventure Game of 2008" by RealArcade
	"Best World Design" by RealArcade

Much like the original Dream Chronicles, the game earned positive responses from casual game critics. On the second time with the series, Gamezebo's Chuck Miller praised the game and said: "Like its predecessor, [Dream Chronicles 2]'s an amazing piece of craftsmanship. Visuals are beautifully rendered. Each scene features gorgeous imagery, with many including animated objects like falling leaves, rippling pools and tumbling waterfalls. Atmospheric audio accentuates play. Exceptional music and sound effects bring the game's fantastical world to life. Plus, an unexpected plot twist adds to the mystery, while a built-in leaderboard allows you to compare your questing skills with those of other players". Miller also noticed it's "a bit on the short side for an adventure", but still rated the game 4.5/5.0 stars overall.

Ms. 45 from Jay Is Games expressed her opinions on the game's impressive production value: "The artwork is impeccable — beautiful, immersive, and extremely good at hiding that last item you desperately need to get to the next level. [...] The overall layout is essentially the same, but the addition of more complex puzzles and useful Dream Jewels scattered around the levels adds a new layer to the experience". Awem Studio also highly enjoyed Dream Chronicles 2, and commented: "The sequel [Dream Chronicles 2] follows in its forerunner's path and delights its players with gorgeous graphics and enchanting music. [...] The artwork is gorgeously dreamy and it adds some special coloring to the entire atmosphere of mystery and enigma. [...] The backdrops are fragrant with eye-soothing nature and landscapes while the sounds of the game are incredibly enchanting and fascinating. The visual and sound aspects are greatly satisfying and create a real Dream World. [Dream Chronicles 2] is one of those games that will be engraved in your memory and win over your heart".

In contrast, Adventure Gamers only gave the game 3.0 out of 5.0 stars, summarizing that the game is "a noticeable improvement over the original, Dream Chronicles 2 nevertheless retains a few too many common adventure-like problems to fulfill its evident potential". In July 2009, Dream Chronicles 2 won two awards, "Top Adventure Game of 2008" and "Best World Design", in their first RealGames Great Games Awards.
