= Dream Chronicles: The Chosen Child =

2009 video game

- Steam header for The Chosen Child
- Developer: KatGames
- Publisher: PlayFirst
- Director: Miguel Tartaj
- Producers: Christopher Williams; Angel Inokon
- Designer: Miguel Tartaj
- Programmers: David Gonzalez; Miguel Angel Linan
- Artists: Pablo Vietto; 3dBrigade
- Writers: Michelle Woods; Patrick Baggatta
- Composer: Adam Gubman
- Series: Dream Chronicles
- Engine: Playground SDK
- Platforms: Microsoft Windows macOS iOS
- Release: April 16, 2009: PC/Mac, Standard April 16, 2009 PC/Mac, Bundled with Pt. 1 & 2 September 3, 2010 Retail, Standard; FRA: November 5, 2010 Retail, Bundled with Pt. 4 July 13, 2011 iOS, Standard August 29, 2012
- Genres: Adventure, puzzle
- Mode: Single-player

Dream Chronicles: The Chosen Child (often shortened to Dream Chronicles 3 or The Chosen Child) is a 2009 adventure and puzzle casual game developed by KatGames and originally published by PlayFirst. It is the third installment in the Dream Chronicles series, the second sequel to 2007's award-winning game Dream Chronicles and also the last part of the first trilogy called Faye's Journey.

The game is set in a mystical world of realistic fantasy where mortal and fairy realms collide, and picks up where Dream Chronicles 2: The Eternal Maze ended. The Chosen Child tells the story of a mortal woman named Faye waking up from a powerful fairy's dream spell with no recollection of her past or her true identity, except for what she can piece together from her frequent dreams, that she has a husband and a daughter who have both been taken by the Fairy Queen of Dreams. Guided by her Fairy husband, who communicates with her through a crystal ball, Faye sets out to save her child once more.

The Chosen Child was first presented limitedly as a beta version in February 2009. It was officially released worldwide as a digital download two months later on April 16. Similar to its predecessors, The Chosen Child immediately became another Dream Chronicles hit, reaching number-one of eleven casual game charts and peaking inside top ten on many other charts. The game was critically well received by casual game critics, describing it as "another visually stunning Myst-like adventure that transports players into a fantasy world of fairies". In June 2010, The Chosen Child was nominated for two awards, "Top Hidden Object Game" and "Best Story", in the second annual GameHouse Great Game Awards. The Chosen Child was preceded by Dream Chronicles 2: The Eternal Maze (2008) and followed by Dream Chronicles: The Book of Air (2010).

A high-definition version of this game was available via App Store for iPad device in August 2012.

== Gameplay ==
Dream Chronicles: The Chosen Child is an adventure-like hidden object game with numerous puzzles and challenging tasks. Its gameplay is structured much like that in Dream Chronicles 2: The Eternal Maze, and goes deeper than its predecessors. Each area, which consists of half a dozen or more unique locations, has a set of puzzles to solve using items players find strewn about the landscape. Players as Faye have to travel back and forth to find what they are looking for. Carrying items between scenes is an important part of solving the intricate puzzles. There are many puzzle types in game: word unscrambling, potion mixing, looking for constellations with the help of telescope, piecing together a sewing machine, playing Simon and sliding games, locating items in the right place and other logic-type games. The objects that players find may be used in a scene other than the one they found it in. Objects will stay in inventory until players need to use them. All objects that players are able to pick up will serve a purpose, whether they are used in that scene or not. A lot of times in this game the pieces players pick up may only be used as they get to the next scene. Some items may not become visible in a scene right away, and the players must perform other tasks first before they become visible. Players can freely move back and forth between the locations exploring places, solving puzzles, completing tasks and getting clues as to what they should do.

In addition to give players time to explore every aspect of the scenes, KatGames added a device called the Nexus gateway, a series of gateways that allow players to travel to different interconnected locations after they figure out how to unlock them; this makes the game non-linear and allows players to move freely throughout the game world. Instead of being confined to a linear path, The Chosen Child opens the door for wider exploration, creating the epic feel the series needed to move to the next level. As a result, now players can travel back and forth all the scenes by pulling levers to rotate a massive set of gears and portals in the Nexus gateway, yet this unique feature only appeared in The Chosen Child. For the second time in the Dream Chronicles series, players can enjoy the experiences of solving maze puzzles. The Chosen Child contains two underwater labyrinths, one in the 19th scene and the other one in the 23rd scene, but they are criticized for their highly difficult level preventing some players from completing the whole game. The game has a hint system, in the form of crystal ball. It rarely tells the exact solution, but instead gives players slight hints. Like in the two previous games of the series, the screen sparkles at times hinting the place where players are to pick up or apply something, but that rarely happens. If players get stuck, they have to keep looking until finding the right item.

Like the previous games of the series, The Chosen Child features Dream Jewels and they come with unique usages, as they are required to open new Nexus gateways, and for the first time Dream Jewels can be forged by the players themselves. There are ten gold nuggets and 30 Dream Pieces molding ten Dream Jewels to complete; other 58 gold nuggets and 60 Dream Pieces work as bonus scores, which are all scattered throughout the game. Like Dream Chronicles 2, players need to replay the game several times to be able to find all of 16 Dream Jewels. At the end of the game, players earn a high score. The faster how players can complete the game, the more Dream Pieces and gold nuggets they can find, and the more Dream Jewels they can forge, the better score they will earn. When players play again under the same name, they will have new Dream Jewel molds to forge, and some of the key items themselves will be in different places the second times around.

== Synopsis ==
=== Setting ===
There are 25 main scenes and seven areas featured in the game, and players can travel between all of them using the Nexus device, starting from the fifth scene.

This labyrinth is part of the Underwater Retreat where expectant Fairy mothers rest and restore their powers.

- The Treehouse Village: The people of this village believe that strange occurrences will befall them if they don't live high in the tree-tops. This is also a part of the green belt that runs through the Fairy Realm, all interconnected by Aeval's plant network. Though others may doubt it, Aeval always knew that the trees saw and remembered everything in the world. Over time they have been used to hide treasures and secrets.
- The Nexus Gateway: The transportation hub that Fairies use to travel quickly from the Fairy Realm to the Mortal Realm.
- The Herbalist's House: The herbalist is a mortal who acquired Fairy knowledge and experimented with potions from various plants.
- The Observatory: The magic telescope is used to convert constellations into molds. Molds are used in the Forge to create Dream Jewels, which open new places in the Nexus Gateway.
- The Village of Wish: This is the tiny town of Wish, where Faye lives with her husband, Fidget, her daughter, Lyra, and Fidget's parents, Tangle and Aeval. It is an insular place, far from cities and civilization. The town is surrounded by tall walls, not to keep the residents inside - for they have no desire to leave the safety and warmth of their community - but to keep the town protected from the outside world: they are thus secured with complex weighted locks, first seen in Dream Chronicles. The streets are cobbled, lined with colorful dwellings and stores. Beyond the walls of Wish lie lush forests and winding roads that lead to other larger towns, but the folk of Wish have little desire to visit those distant places. Their homes are secured in their beloved village where they believe no harm can come to them. Before Faye, no one had left the village in many years.
- The Underwater Retreat: Expectant Fairy mothers travel to this spa-like retreat to rest and restore their magical powers.
- The Eternal Maze: As a final safeguard so that no mortal could ever enter or leave the Ancients' Place, the Fairies created an underground maze with no light, and no map. This made Fairy passage almost impossible as well, so some of the Fairies created a map to help them find their way between Realms.

=== Plot ===
Fidget and his daughter Lyra are reuniting at the end of the game.

A mortal woman named Brenna has a strange dream in which she has a husband and a daughter who are both taken from her by the Fairy Queen of Dreams. When Brenna wakes, the dream quickly begins to fade, which frustrates her. While trying to find a way to note it down, Brenna discovers a crystal ball containing the same man who has appeared in her strange dreams: he insists that she find a little girl named Lyra. Bewildered, Brenna follows the strange man's guidance, as she feels that she can trust him. Brenna is led to a house, that of the herbalist, through the Nexus gateway. After concocting a memory recovery potion, Brenna remembers everything: herself Faye, her husband Fidget, her missing daughter Lyra, and her family's old rival: the Fairy Queen of Dreams, Lilith. Faye hurries to rescue Lyra by following the clues left for her by someone unknown. In order to open new areas in the Fairy Realm, Faye needs to forge more Dream Jewels, which leads her to an area called the Forging Area. She learns that Lilith is hiding in an underwater retreat. On the way finding an amulet that could unleash the cliffside elevator's power and help her reach Lilith's retreat, Faye returns to her home in the Town of Wish for the first time since she began her journey. The house is full of dust. As Faye feels more closer to Lyra, she encourages herself to keep going on.

After traveling beneath the sea, through many meditation rooms and two labyrinths, Faye eventually arrives at Lilith's retreat, and meets the Fairy Queen face-to-face. Faye demands to know where Lyra is, but Lilith calms her, saying that the Dream Librarian has abducted Lyra, believing her to be the Chosen Child of prophecy. This prophecy states that a half-fairy, half-mortal child will replace the missing Fairy Lord. Lilith reveals that she has been guiding Faye with clues all along, because she refuses to accept Lyra as her new Fairy Lord. Suddenly yet strangely, Lilith offers to help Faye bring Lyra back. Though acknowledging that Lilith probably has her own "selfish interests at heart", as a mother Faye has no choice but to accept Lilith's request. Going back to the Enchanted Tree, where Lilith once captured Fidget in Dream Chronicles 2: The Eternal Maze, Faye takes Lyra's favorite teddy bear, and brings Lyra back home. Faye's family is ultimately united, and a new life lies ahead of them. Faye does not care if Lyra becomes a new Fairy Lord or not, though one thing she does not know is that Lilith is pregnant, and no one knows exactly what she will do next.

== Development ==
On a PlayFirst's blog post, the founder and lead designer of KatGames, Miguel Tartaj described some new puzzle features in The Chosen Child. When KatGames started designing the puzzles for The Chosen Child, they wanted to focus on having the player experiment and interact with the scenes a lot more than in the previous Dream Chronicles games. There were a few puzzles in Dream Chronicles 2: The Eternal Maze where all the player was required to collect a lot of items from the scene and put them back where they belonged. While this is still fun, it can get repetitive. To address this, they invented some elaborate and magical devices for The Chosen Child where the player has to focus more carefully on figuring out the right items to collect and the proper combination in which to use them.

The Chosen Child is presented at a higher resolution of 1024×768 instead of the original 800×600 resolution in order to deliver even richer, more detailed, and beautiful scenes to players. In addition, the size and quantity of the animations in the scenes have also been increased to bring more life to the game. Every scene in the game has moving elements to make them more immersive and compelling. For example, when players activate the mechanism to shift the magical portals in the Nexus gateway, massive gears turn to show them how the doors are shifting to give them access to new areas of the game. Players may also notice more subtle atmospheric effects like drifting clouds, blowing sand, or fish swimming by the windows in the underwater areas.

Tartaj described some new feature highlights in the game: the Nexus gateway, the crystal ball, and the underwater labyrinths. In Dream Chronicles 2, players would move through areas of the game and never see them again. KatGames felt this diminished the believability of the game world and didn't give players time to really explore every aspect of the scenes. This was the motivation behind adding the Nexus gateway. Meanwhile, a crystal ball is also added in game to make sure that players have the necessary hints and help they needed to keep moving forward through the story. Finally, two underwater labyrinths featured in game are actual three-dimensional spaces that players can move around in. This means they can watch the fluid and beautiful graphics flow by them just like players are actually walking around in a maze.

=== Design ===
The Nexus gateway allows players to travel through the game by using the combination of Dream Jewels.

Art director Pablo Vietto explained the inspirations behind the artwork development of the Dream Chronicles series. From the start, the goal with the Dream Chronicles series was to bring the story and adventure to life in a world inspired by a unique art style. The work of Antonio Gaudi – a famous Spanish architect known for his fantastic modern designs – was at the heart of this inspiration. The Art Nouveau movement that he represented provided the perfect combination of fantasy and reality with his designs being based on appealing and organic shapes.

When starting the design of a scene for one of the Dream Chronicles games, KatGames made extensive research to gather reference and ideas for the architecture, devices, and graphical elements that could be used. Based on these materials, they created sketches to consolidate the ideas and see how all the elements fit together. Since the game is presented from a first-person point of view, a principal sketch was created with particular attention given to how the scene is framed and composed, as if someone was actually standing in the space. To develop the more complex objects, additional sketches were often created to communicate an extra level of detail to the modelers.

== Release and post-release ==
Dream Chronicles: The Chosen Child was first presented limitedly as a beta version in February 2009 for the publisher PlayFirst's players. It was officially released two months later on April 16 by PlayFirst and was promoted: "Dream Chronicles: The Chosen Child brings the Dream Chronicles series to a new level [...] With a backdrop of amazingly intricate artwork and advanced technical detail as well as the new multi area puzzles allowing for more player mobility, established fans and new players will be challenged and delighted". The Chosen Child was another instant Dream Chronicles hit reaching number-one of eleven casual game charts: PlayFirst, Shockwave, RealArcade, Oberon Games, SpinTop Games, MSN Games, Logler Global, iWin.com, GameFiesta, Mac Game Store and Yahoo! Games; number-two on GameHouse, Reflexive Arcade, Pogo.com and Amazon.com; number-three on Big Fish Games and peaking inside top twenty on other casual game charts.

A high-definition version of this game was available via App Store for iPad device in August 2012 and the latest version was updated in November the same year.

=== Reception ===
Reception

Review scores
| Publication | Score |
|---|---|
| Adventure Gamers | 2.5/5 |
| Awem Studio | (favorable) |
| Gamezebo | 4/5 |
| Jay Is Games | (favorable) |

Awards
| Publication | Award |
|---|---|
| | "1st Runner-Up Best Puzzle Adventure Game of 2009" by Big Fish Games |
| | "Top Hidden Object Game of 2009" by GameHouse (nominated) |
| | "Best Story" by GameHouse (nominated) |

Like the previous Dream Chronicles games, The Chosen Child earned positive reviews from casual game critics.

Gamezebo's Erin Bell commented on The Chosen Child's highly qualified production value: "The Dream Chronicles series has earned a reputation for having beautiful visuals and music. [...] Each of the game's environments has been lovingly crafted with a soft, distinctive art style bursting with detail, and the soundtrack is equally evocative. In short, The Chosen Child boasts production values that put many of the recent hidden object game releases to shame". She noted that length of the game is "disappointing" and "on the short side", and gave a rating of 4.0/5.0 stars.

Comparing the game with the popular Myst series, John Bardinelli from Jay Is Games expressed: "[The Chosen Child]'s as breathtakingly brilliant as everyone would expect. A little bit of hidden object finding, a little bit of puzzle solving, and a whole lot of adventuring can be found in this superb sequel, along with some of the most gorgeous scenery you've seen since looking out your own window. [...] It's an excellent follow-up to the previous Dream Chronicles games and a fantastic game in its own right". Later, John continued giving compliments to The Chosen Child: "These [Dream Chronicles] titles just keep getting better and better. [...] The puzzles are constructed so cleverly you might even giggle when you think of the solution. And I swear you'll melt from the combination of the gorgeous visuals and enchanting music".

Meanwhile, Awem Studio declared that The Chosen Child is "a fantastic game" and "a must have for all fans of the genre", saying that "Dream Chronicles: The Chosen Child fulfills the series' best traditions and looks elegant. The smooth and vibrant dreamy world presents gorgeous scenes and magically changes locations before your eyes. Enchanting music adds to the atmosphere. There is little new in the interface, but it's what fans expect and love in Dream Chronicles". In contrast, Adventure Gamers gave the game 2.5 out of 5 stars summarizing that "it's not the worst game of the series in its own right, but [The Chosen Child] is all the more disappointing for still failing to resolve the easily-avoidable problems plaguing the series three games running".

In early 2010, The Chosen Child was awarded for the "1st Runner-Up Best Puzzle Adventure Game of 2009", as well as being picked into the 2009 Customer Favorites list by Big Fish Games. This is the second time a game from Dream Chronicles series entered the Big Fish Games' most popular games annual list. The game itself was also ranked 22nd by GameHouse in its list of "30 Top Games of 2009". In June 2010, The Chosen Child was nominated for two awards, "Top Hidden Object Game of 2009" and "Best Story", in their second annual GameHouse Great Game Awards, though it didn't win any eventually.
