= Dream Chronicles (video game) =

2007 video game

- Steam header for Dream Chronicles
- Developer: KatGames
- Publisher: PlayFirst
- Director: Miguel Tartaj
- Producer: Kenny Dinkin
- Designer: Miguel Tartaj
- Programmers: David Gonzalez; Miguel Angel Linan
- Artists: Pablo Vietto; Nikitova LLC
- Writers: Eleanor Burian-Mohr; Cornerstore Entertainment
- Composers: Adam Gubman; Kane Minkus; Nick Thomas
- Series: Dream Chronicles
- Engine: Playground SDK
- Platforms: Microsoft Windows macOS iOS; Xbox 360; PlayStation 3 Nintendo DS
- Release: June 12, 2007: PC/Mac, Standard June 12, 2007 Retail, Standard September 24, 2007 Retail, Bundled with Pt. 2 December 21, 2009 PC/Mac, Bundled with Pt. 2 & 3 September 3, 2010 iOS, Standard December 12, 2011
- Genres: Adventure, hidden object, puzzle
- Mode: Single-player

Dream Chronicles (originally titled Dream Chronicles: The Endless Slumber) is a 2007 adventure, hidden object, and puzzle casual game developed by KatGames and published by PlayFirst. It is the first installment in the series.

Set in a mystical world where mortal and fairy realms collide, the game tells the story of a mortal woman named Faye who is the only being able to awaken from a powerful fairy's dream spell. She embarks on an adventure through a dream world to find her fairy husband and save her hometown. To solve the mystery, players must complete puzzles and search for clues leading to the whereabouts of Faye's husband.

As the first part of the first trilogy, Dream Chronicles spawned two direct sequels, Dream Chronicles 2: The Eternal Maze and Dream Chronicles: The Chosen Child, which were released in 2008 and 2009 respectively.

== Gameplay ==
Dream Chronicles is a seek-and-find adventure game. Its gameplay consists of a series of puzzles that the player must solve to reach the next chapter. Each scene incorporates one or more puzzles. Most involve searching for and making use of hidden objects, while others are logic puzzles. Players are required to collect items from the scene and put them back where they belong.

When the player enters a room or location for the first time, the main character, Faye, makes an entry statement, serving as brief instructions for the player. Almost all objects in a room can be described to the player by Faye. Items can be collected and placed in the inventory. Once there, the player can use them on other objects, and combine them to solve puzzles. Unlike "hardcore" adventure games, items only function within the room in which they are collected, and not in future puzzles. Solving the puzzle at hand unlocks the door to the next location. The game itself is separated into many segments, separated by cut-scenes that tell the story through the main character Faye's point of view.

Various colored gems are present throughout the game. These are Dream Pieces, gems that make up the Dream Jewels collection. They provide detailed information about some important fairies and their roles in the Fairy Realm which features in the series. Finding and completing Dream Jewels adds to the player's score at the end of the game. Though regarded as borrowing Myst series' concepts, Dream Chronicles is one of the earliest casual games combining the adventure game's elements with hidden object game's proportions (along with Azada and Mortimer Beckett).

At the end of the game, the player earns a high score, depending on completion time and number of Dream Pieces found. When re-playing the game under the same name to beat the score, the location of some items changes.

== Plot ==
The town of Wish, where Faye lives with her husband Fidget, her daughter Lyra and Fidget's parents, Tangle and Aeval

A mortal woman named Faye had a dream in which the Fairy Queen of Dreams, Lilith, was casting a dream spell upon her Town of Wish, and making every resident fell into a magically deep sleep. Strangely, Faye could hear her husband Fidget trying hopelessly to awaken her somehow. Waking up from this dream, Faye cannot believe that those things that have occurred in her dreams are happening in reality as well: Lilith has already abducted Fidget. However, before being abducted, Fidget used his remaining power, removed the sleep spell from Faye, and left a path for her to follow in his precious diary. Faye decides to check her little daughter Lyra, but Lyra is falling into the sleep spell like every other resident in the town. Faye starts her journey in hope of finding Fidget, but is constantly hindered by Lilith's magical obstacles. It is not long before Faye discovers the secret that the in-law family has tried to keep from her so long: Fidget and his parents are Fairies. Faye soon learns more about the in-law family's fairy heritage and their secret past. She acknowledges that all marriages are arranged in the Fairy Realm, and the concept of love was unknown until Fidget's parents, Aeval and Tangle, fell in love. Fidget was to marry Lilith, but his parents chose to raise him in the mortal world, so he could marry a mortal for love too. Lilith believed that her marriage to Fidget would strengthen her powers as the Fairy Queen of Dreams. She already had the power to watch and monitor the dreams, daydreams, and imaginings of mortals, but she wanted the power to control their dreams. Since Fidget married Faye, Lilith has hatched an evil plan to make sure that Fidget will become hers. Fidget reveals these secrets to Faye through his diary, which makes Faye feel confused and frustrated. She soon accepts the truth when she discovers a talking, carnivorous plant named Herbert who, according to Fidget, is his mother's best friend. After leaving the comfort of her in-laws' home, Faye crosses the street and tries to open the main gate of the Town of Wish. She ventures outside but quickly gets lost in the forest when the moon rises. Luckily, a sign found in the dark shows Faye directly to Lilith's mansion where she thinks Lilith is keeping her husband. Faye finds Fidget there and is able to reunite with him momentarily. Lilith soon appears to separate the couple again, taking Fidget with her and casting another sleep spell upon Faye. Faye falls into another deep sleep and hopelessly sees Lilith taking Fidget in front of her.

== Development ==
Original draft of the Glass House scene. The earliest version of the Dream Chronicles logo can be also seen here.

Before releasing Dream Chronicles, KatGames had developed eight games but none of them earned success because of their poorly low-budget appearances. Having been aware of this, when starting the development of their ninth title (which became Dream Chronicles), KatGames moonlighted on it during other projects in the hope to find funding and attention for the game.

In 2005, CEO and lead game designer of KatGames, Miguel Tartaj shared the game idea with two potential partners but according to him "it didn't go anywhere". Tartaj wanted to find a publisher who could provide his team with the creative input and non-development support. He also needed a partner whom his team trusted, and had a track record of successfully navigating the casual games market. Tartaj first met PlayFirst's creative director Kenny Dinkin and director of publishing Craig Bocks at Casual Connect Amsterdam in 2006, and pitched to him the idea of Dream Chronicles. KatGames eventually signed an agreement to PlayFirst on what came to be known in June 2007 as Dream Chronicles.

Miguel Tartaj shared his thoughts when KatGames became a PlayFirst's partner: "We knew that an adventure game like Dream Chronicles was going to be unique for our team and unique for the casual games industry. [...] The iterative nature of a story-based game like Dream Chronicles was going to require a much higher degree of flexibility throughout the game's design and development process. Each new scene involved unique graphics, puzzles, and story elements, so we knew that it wouldn't all be 'figured out' upfront. I prefer to work more iteratively and put pieces together to try things out as we go along. PlayFirst's willingness to accept this fact was something that I appreciated in terms of my work style. Not only being able to work this way, but to also be supported in doing it was a great advantage for my team. We truly were able to 'dream' as we went along".

== Release and post-release ==
Dream Chronicles was first released as a download on June 12, 2007 by PlayFirst. The game peaked at number-one on PlayFirst, Logler Global, RealArcade, GameHouse, Shockwave, MSN Games and Zylom; number-two on iWin.com, Arcade Town, Big Fish Games and Yahoo! Games; number-three on Reflexive Arcade and Oberon Games. It peaked inside top ten on Pogo.com, SpinTop Games, Amazon.com and other major casual game charts.

A high-definition version of this game was available via App Store for iPad device in December 2011.

=== Reception ===
Reception

Aggregate scores
| Aggregator | Score |
|---|---|
| GameRankings | (PS3) 40.00% (X360) 37.20% (PC) 50.00% |
| Metacritic | (PS3) 31/100 (X360) 36/100 |

Review scores
| Publication | Score |
|---|---|
| Adventure Gamers | 2.5/5 |
| Gamezebo | 5/5 |
| Jay Is Games | (favorable) |

Dream Chronicles was met with generally unfavorable reviews. According to review aggregator Metacritic, upon the release of Dream Chronicles to home consoles in 2010, it was the worst received PlayStation 3 game of the year, and the fifth worst received Xbox 360 game of the year. Criticism was commonly leveled at the game's dated and uninspired gameplay, but it received some praise for its artwork. Despite its poor critical reception across major outlets, the game was warmly received by some casual game reviewers.

=== Impact ===
In late 2007, Dream Chronicles was awarded for the "2nd Runner-Up Best Puzzle Game of 2007", and picked into the 2007 Customer Favorites list by Big Fish Games. In early 2008, the game received five nominations at the Second Annual Casual Game "Zeeby" Awards held by Gamezebo, including four Craft Awards (Best Visual Art, Best Story, Best Innovative Game, and Best Audio Game of 2007) and one People's Choice Award (Best Hidden Object & Adventure Game of 2007). Dream Chronicles won the latter and lost the former to Mystery Case Files: Madame Fate, Build-a-lot, and Peggle respectively in July 2008.
