= Dream Chronicles: The Book of Air =

2010 video game

- Steam header for The Book of Air
- Developer: KatGames
- Publisher: PlayFirst
- Director: Aaron Norstad
- Producers: Ryan Sindledecker; Craig Bocks
- Designer: Miguel Tartaj
- Programmers: David Gonzalez; Miguel Angel Linan
- Artists: Pablo Vietto; 3dBrigade
- Writers: Pete Clark; Eleanor Burian-Mohr
- Composer: Adam Gubman
- Series: Dream Chronicles
- Engine: Playground SDK
- Platforms: Microsoft Windows macOS iOS
- Release: June 24, 2010: PC/Mac, Collector's June 24, 2010 PC/Mac, Standard July 8, 2010 Retail, Bundled with Pt. 3 July 13, 2011 iOS, Standard May 5, 2011
- Genres: Adventure, puzzle
- Mode: Single-player

Dream Chronicles: The Book of Air (often shortened to Dream Chronicles 4 or The Book of Air) is a 2010 adventure and puzzle casual game developed by KatGames, originally published by PlayFirst. It is the fourth installment in the Dream Chronicles series, the third sequel to 2007's award-winning game Dream Chronicles, and the opening part of the second unfinished trilogy titled Lyra's Destiny.

Re-opening the story ten years after the conclusion of the third game, Dream Chronicles: The Chosen Child, players now take on the role of Lyra, the daughter of the previous main character Faye, as her destiny unfolds. Set in a mystical world of realistic fantasy where mortal and fairy realms collide, the game opens on the eve of Lyra's 18th birthday when she is magically transported to an alternate dimension. Following clues left behind by her grandfather and taking the helm of a flying airship, Lyra explores the mystical landmarks of the gorgeous, yet mysterious Dream world, in search of the mystical Clockmaker who is the only one that can restore time and return her to her family.

The Book of Air was first presented limitedly as a beta version in March 2010. It was released worldwide as a digital download under two editions, Collector's and Standard, on June 24 and July 8 respectively by PlayFirst. Each edition was quickly available on PlayFirst's exclusive partner, Big Fish Games, on the following day of each release date. Both editions feature the optional double-mode game, while the Collector's one contains an extra location, seven mini-puzzles, some concept artworks, six wallpapers, the game soundtrack, a detailed walkthrough, a PC screensaver, and a sneak peek (actually some artworks) at the fifth game The Book of Water. A high-definition version of this game was available via App Store for iPad device in May 2011, becoming the first game in the series to be released there.

Unlike three previous games, it was met with mixed to positive reviews from casual game critics, describing it as "a beautiful point-and-click fantasy game that mixes puzzles and slight hidden object hunting to create a beautiful adventure series", though they criticized it for not matching the highly polished standards of three previous games and its very short length. The game itself still proved to be commercially successful, and reached the top of seven major casual game charts. The Book of Air spawned a direct sequel named Dream Chronicles: The Book of Water (2011).

== Gameplay ==
Dream Chronicles: The Book of Air is structured much like other three previous games in the series with some major twists. There are many improvements in gameplay overall compared to others. It is more of a quest-like adventure than a traditional hidden object game, a mixing of adventure and puzzle game. Featuring loads of puzzles and logical quests with different difficulties, the puzzles in The Book of Air are well-tricky and tightly blended with the story, which is a typical feature of quest or click-and-point games, such as putting together parts of broken statues, reconstructing tricky mechanisms, unscrambling messages using the power of Dream Jewels and many more. There are no lists of items to find but a huge amount of inventory based puzzles, logical riddles and quests to solve, which have been scattered through the locations in the game. The objects that players find may be used in a scene other than the one they found it in. Objects will stay in inventory until players need to use them. All objects that players are able to pick up will serve a purpose, whether they are used in that scene or not. A lot of times in this game the pieces players pick up may only be used as they get to the next scene. Some items may not become visible in a scene right away, and the players must perform other tasks first before they become visible.

One of the biggest improvements The Book of Air has over its predecessors is a system of hints for locating difficult items. Although it is still possible to get hung up on some of the game's more taxing brainteasers, players will no longer find themselves stuck trying to find items thanks to a recharging magnifying glass 'hint power' that can be used to reveal an object's location, but if there are not any, the power of hints is not used. There are two difficulty modes to play, Casual and Challenge. Each mode has the same puzzles but their complexities are different. At the beginning, the game offers players the option to play in either Casual or Challenge Mode, and if they want the game to offer the slightest bit of resistance they would pick the former. While Casual Mode offers simpler puzzles and the ability to skip them if players get stuck long enough, Challenge Mode offers slightly harder puzzles, but will not let players skip any. Players cannot change the difficulty once they have chosen it.

The Book of Air features Dream Jewels that come with five special powers. They can be used to decode fairy words ("Decipher"), make hidden fairy things visible ("Reveal"), transmute gold into wood ("Transmute"), illuminate dark rooms ("Illuminate"), and create thunder or rain ("Thunder"). In order to activate Dream Jewels, players need to fill them with Dream Pieces which are thrown throughout, and they can also use the "hint power" to find Dream Pieces. At the end of the game, players earn a high score. The faster how players can complete the game, the more Dream Jewels and Dream Pieces they can find, and the fewer times they skip puzzles, the better score they will earn. When players play again under the same name, some of the key items themselves will be in different places the second times around.

== Synopsis ==
=== Setting ===
The Streets of Wish is where Lyra starts the journey to get back to her original dimension.

Dream Chronicles: The Book of Air spans several distinct areas that can be traveled to by airship once players discover the correct coordinates for a location and use colored stones to fill up the fuel device. There are 14 main scenes and six large areas featured in the game:

- The Village of Wish: This is the tiny town of Wish, where Lyra lives with her parents, Fidget and Faye, and her grandparents, Tangle and Aeval. It is an insular place, far from cities and civilization. The town is surrounded by tall walls, not to keep the residents inside, for they have no desire to leave the safety and warmth of their community. The walls are there to keep the outside world outside, and are secured with complex weighted locks first seen in Dream Chronicles. The streets are cobbled, lined with colorful dwellings and stores. Beyond the walls of Wish lie lush forests and winding roads that, eventually, lead to other larger towns, but the folk of Wish have little desire to visit those distant places. Their homes are secured in their beloved village where, they believe, no harm can come to them.
- The Clockmaker's House: A distant frozen tundra from where the Clockmaker, a powerful if solitary fairy, synchronizes time both in the mortal and fairy worlds. The low temperatures at the Clockmaker's house are useful for slowing any clocks that might consider racing ahead. The eternal snow keeps the Clockmaker's parts pristine. No plants grow in his frozen wasteland but long ago Aeval brought him flowers from a more hospitable clime, and their image is now pressed into various pieces throughout the Clockmaker's domain. Obsessing with his eternal job, the Clockmaker never leaves, and tries to prevent any person from coming to his hideout.
- The Treehouse Village: The people of this village believe that strange occurrences will befall them if they don't live high in tree tops. This is also a part of the green belt that runs through the fairy world. It is all part of Aeval's plant network. Though others may doubt it, Aeval always knew that the trees saw and remembered everything. Over time they have been used to hide treasures and secrets. In The Book of Air, someone within the fairy world has turned the trees to gold, keeping them from "speaking" with Aeval. The trees are being used to protect a key, the item that the Clockmaker needs to fix his Time Synchronization Machine. Lyra must help the trees in order for the trees to help Lyra.
- The Wind Music Island: The place where fairies created the first music, using the instruments that can be found there. Mortal music, it is said, is born when mortals hear bits of fairy music while they sleep. In the distance, looming ominously, it is the Tower of Dreams, where Faye searched for Fidget in Dream Chronicles 2. Before the fairies moved on from Wind Music Island, they created a stone instrument band—musical instruments of stone that played music on their own so that the music would continue forever.
- The Water Collector: This is the basis of the infrastructure for fairy civilization. Here water is collected, purified, and dispersed. For many years Aeval took a proprietary interest in the Water Collector, to be certain all plants were adequately nourished. There is a system inside the cottage which tests not only the purity of the water, but the amount of elements within each measure of water. Water from different sources carries different properties, which are utilized by fairies responsible for different aspects of the world.
- The Barge City: A town built over the water, well south of the Village of Wish, it is the home of many fishermen and merchants.

=== Plot ===
Lyra's grandfather Tangle is holding a handmade birthday gift, and soon giving it to her.

On the eve of the 18th birthday, a half-fairy half-mortal girl named Lyra had a strange dream. All her friends and family were there tonight to celebrate that special event, and Lyra's grandfather Tangle had prepared an amazing gift for her, but then Lyra heard a whisper, and everyone quickly disappeared. Waking up from that dream, Lyra finds herself alone in her beloved Town of Wish as she is being trapped in a parallel dimension which is similar to her original one. Guided by the messages left by Tangle and using her father's magically hidden airship, Lyra breaks out to find Tangle's odd fairy friend simply called the Clockmaker, who is the only stranger could help her get back home, and reunite with family and friends. She finds the Clockmaker in his hideout and thankfully, he agrees to help. Lyra have to find three magical keys in three separately hidden areas – Treehouse Village, Wind Music Island, and Water Collector – to re-activate the Clockmaker's Time Synchronization Machine.

On arriving to the Wind Music Island, Lyra is notified by Tangle that the music eons in this island were once created by fairies, who also used to live there. Lyra finds his notification confusing, though she gradually understands that fairies are responsible of what have been happening to her: the magical chalkboard, the hidden airship, a stranger's whisper, and the five powerful powers that Lyra is granted to use, but still she have known her fairy roots yet, as Tangle keeps it from her. After finding all three keys, Lyra returns to the Clockmaker's house and finishes her mission there. She is able to head back to her original dimension, also questioning the adventure that she has taken, but instead of welcoming Lyra with sunshine and daylight, her Town of Wish becomes dark and full of thunders. Lyra wonders what will await for her next.

In the bonus chapter, Lyra has a new dream. She was in the Town of Wish, her family was calling for her, but Lyra couldn't hear them over the sound of rushing water. Her body became light as if she had been floating. Lyra held her breath and fell deeper into that strange dream. Once again, she finds herself alone in another unrecognizable place, a small office in the Barge City, and looks for a magical map.

== Development ==
When the publisher PlayFirst's blog staff interviewed with the game's producer Ryan Sindledecker, he gave players an in depth look at Dream Chronicles: The Book of Air. Taking about coming up with the new features, Ryan shared that the developer, Kat Games came up with all the new features, including using Dream Jewels as powers. With each Dream Chronicles game, Dream Jewels were used differently. In The Book of Air there was a need to add these powers and a need to have a new use for the Jewels and they just fit together perfectly. After the Standard Edition of the game was released, Sindledecker uploaded a special walkthrough for The Book of Air on PlayFirst's blog.

=== Design ===
The Wind Music Island is inspired by the work of Antonio Gaudi who is famous for his unique Art Nouveau designs.

Art director Pablo Vietto explained that for the "Airship" artwork, KatGames wanted to make a "very rustic and compact interior where they could place everything necessary for the navigation of the airship". The artistic inspiration came from the old machines designed by Da Vinci and used in the Jules Verne stories, but adapted to their own style. As for "Streets of Wish" artwork, Vietto expressed that he wanted to "keep the essence of the Wish village from the first Dream Chronicles, respecting the roofs and cupules in green tonalities". The idea of having a house with a cupule for a roof was in his mind since the first Dream Chronicles, so this was the perfect opportunity to use it again. According to Vietto, some other details, like the iron works and lights, were inspired by works done by Hector Guimard, a French architect and one of the most important ones during Modernism. Regarding "Wind Music Island" artwork, Vietto said that KatGames needed an extravagant scenario showing antique constructions made with rocks and natural things around, like coral. Part of the spaces and forms were inspired by the Güell park from Antoni Gaudí. The sculptures and instruments resulted from a combination of the natural forms coming from coral, other sea elements and the figure of a woman (which is always present in their style).

=== Audio ===
For the first time in the Dream Chronicles series, players can hear characters' in-game voices. There was also an original soundtrack included exclusively in the Collector's Edition of The Book of Air.

Dream Chronicles: The Book of Air soundtrack track list
No.	Title	Length
1.	"Main Theme"	0:55
2.	"The Book of Air Opening"	1:22
3.	"Wish"	1:11
4.	"Water Collector"	1:21
5.	"Lyra's Adventure"	1:06
6.	"Fairy Dreams"	1:05
7.	"Taking Flight"	1:08
8.	"Tree Village"	1:00
9.	"Light Dreams"	1:13
10.	"Mortal Light"	1:29
11.	"Faye's Memory"	1:38
12.	"Thoughts"	1:21
13.	"Tangle's Message"	1:16
14.	"Wind Music"	1:16
15.	"Journey Home"	1:30
Total length:		18:51

=== Marketing ===
In June 2010, PlayFirst updated for the second time the Dream Chronicles official brand page on their website with an interactive map. By clicking on notable spots on the map, players could get more details about all important places which have appeared in the Dream Chronicles series, but the map was removed a year later when The Book of Water was released.

To celebrate the official launch of The Book of Air Collector's Edition, PlayFirst invited four local Dream Chronicles fans in San Francisco, United States. The invitation included one and a half hour to preview the game, a trip to the California Academy of Sciences, a tour around their office, and time to speak with a panel of the local Dream Chronicles team about the inspiration, story, and future of the Dream Chronicles series. The fans got a chance to speak with Kenny Dinkin, PlayFirst's Chief Creative Officer about the inspiration for Dream Chronicles, and how they worked with the developer KatGames. PlayFirst also hosted seven members of the media, three of their local Dream Chronicles fans, their CEO Mari Baker, and senior product marketing manager Becky Ann Hughes on a real airship ride over San Francisco Bay Area, mimicking Lyra's own travels in the game.

== Release and post-release ==
Dream Chronicles: The Book of Air was first presented limitedly as a beta version in March 2010 for the publisher PlayFirst's players. It was officially first released as Collector's Edition digitally on June 24 by PlayFirst and was promoted: "The Dream Chronicles series has earned a reputation for its stunning art, extraordinary puzzles, and intricate, evolving storylines [...] With Dream Chronicles: The Book of Air, these hallmarks of the series are taken to new heights, with the addition of features that will delight both the casual and expert player. Fans will not believe where the story of this new trilogy takes them". The Standard Edition was released shortly later on July 8 on PlayFirst.

Each edition was quickly available on PlayFirst's exclusive partner, Big Fish Games, on the following day of each release date. Both editions feature the optional double-mode game, while the Collector's one also includes an extra location, seven mini-puzzles, some concept artworks, six wallpapers, the game soundtrack, a detailed walkthrough, a PC screensaver, and a sneak peek (actually some artworks) at the fifth game The Book of Water. These extra features (excluding the bonus game) were released exclusively as a stand-alone piece named "Dream Chronicles: The Book of Air Strategy Guide", along with the release of the Standard Edition, on Big Fish Games on July 9. This Strategy Guide was also available on July 16 on PlayFirst.

The Book of Air was another commercially successful Dream Chronicles game, peaking at number-one on seven major casual game charts: PlayFirst, Big Fish Games, iWin.com, SpinTop Games, GameHouse, MSN Games, and Pogo.com; number-three on Yahoo! Games; and number-four on Amazon.com and Mac Game Store.

In May 2011, a high-definition version of this game was available via App Store for iPad device, and the latest version was updated in April 2012. It is the first game in the Dream Chronicles series to be released under the iOS platform.

=== Reception ===
Reception

Review scores
Publication	Score
Adventure Gamers	2.5/5
Gamezebo	3.5/5
Jay Is Games	(favorable)

Award
Publication	Award
	"2nd Runner-Up Best Adventure Game of 2010" by Big Fish Games

Unlike its predecessors, The Book of Air was earned mixed to positive reviews from casual game critics. Positive reviews praised its Dream Chronicles-trademarked high-qualified production values and well-tricky gameplay, while negative reviews criticized its very short length (only 14 scenes to explore, which is even shorter than the original 18-scene Dream Chronicles) and some repetitious puzzles like jigsaw puzzles, placing gears, deciphering letters, and collapse-style fuel puzzles that must be played each time the airship takes off.

Gamezebo's Erin Bell praised the game's animated sequences and highly detailed environments, its character voice-overs, and soundtrack, but also said that the game lacked some of the outstanding factor of previous games in the series as she said that most of the mini-games were variations on things she had seen dozens of times before. Bell also felt that the story ultimately fell a bit flat as players were simply searching for a bunch of keys. Concluding the review, she said: "The Book of Air is still an enjoyable casual adventure/HOG, but compared to the high standards set by previous games in the series, it comes up a little short. Let's hope that Lyra's next adventure is a more memorable one" and eventually gave it 3.5 stars out of 5.

Meanwhile, DoraDoraBoBora from Jay Is Games described the game as a beautiful point-and-click fantasy game that "mixes puzzles and slight hidden-object hunting to create a beautiful adventure series that might not pose too great of a challenge to some players, but is still a captivating experience while it lasts. [...] Visually the game is striking, and wandering through it feels appropriately dreamlike". Like Gamezebo's Erin Bell, Dora noted that The Book of Air was "to set the stage for the next", and said that "The Book of Air mostly just sends you from place to place solving puzzles. After a while, it starts to feel more like a virtual tour of the world as you fly from place to place. [...] If you've been champing [sic] at the bit for another foray into the Dream Chronicles world, you might be disappointed by how quickly the game is over".

Adventure Gamers noted that "The Book of Air is so short and uninspired it feels like a step back for the series" and gave it 2.5 stars out of 5.

In late 2010, The Book of Air was awarded for the "2nd Runner-Up Best Adventure Game of 2010", and picked into the 2010 Customer Favorites list by Big Fish Games. This was the third time (and second in a row) a game from the Dream Chronicles series to enter Big Fish Games' most popular games annual list.
