= Dream Chronicles =

- Franchise logo, used since Dream Chronicles 2 (2008)
- Genres: Adventure, hidden object, puzzle
- Developer: KatGames
- Publishers: PlayFirst; Big Fish Games
- Creator: Miguel Angel Tartaj
- Composer: Adam Gubman
- Platforms: Microsoft Windows macOS iOS; PlayStation 3 Xbox 360; Nintendo DS
- First release: Dream Chronicles; June 12, 2007
- Latest release: Dream Chronicles: The Book of Water; April 24, 2011

Dream Chronicles, first released in 2007, is a series of adventure, hidden object and puzzle casual games. It was created by Miguel Angel Tartaj for KatGames and published by PlayFirst. It is also the name of the first game in the series.

The Dream Chronicles series was intended to include two trilogies, Faye's Journey and Lyra's Destiny, with three games each and two core stories, but only the first five games were released when the distributor and rights holder PlayFirst canceled, releasing and distributing their games on PC/Mac platforms to focus on its growing mobile gaming market. The developer, KatGames, has since moved on to other projects.

== Development ==
Release timeline
2007	Dream Chronicles
2008	Dream Chronicles 2: The Eternal Maze
2009	Dream Chronicles: The Chosen Child
2010	Dream Chronicles: The Book of Air
2011	Dream Chronicles: The Book of Water

In 2005, Miguel Tartaj, the CEO and lead game designer of KatGames, pitched his game concept to two potential partners. Subsequently, Tartaj met PlayFirst's Creative Director, Kenny Dinkin, and Director of Publishing, Craig Bocks, during Casual Connect Amsterdam in the following year. Following negotiations, KatGames reached an agreement with PlayFirst, which resulted in the June 2007 release of Dream Chronicles.

After the success of the original Dream Chronicles, KatGames devoted its time to making the Dream Chronicles series. KatGames team designed the concepts, artworks, and gameplay while partners worked on visual effects, music, story, and marketing. Dream Chronicles was inspired largely by the work of Antonio Gaudi and the Art Nouveau movement.

== Story ==
=== Backstory ===
Players can have a full deep look at the fairy world in the Dream Chronicles series by solving 15 Dream Jewels' secrets in Dream Chronicles 2. Those secrets also reveal where the story in the first Dream Chronicles begins.

Long ago, the first fairies were created from mortals when a meteor collided with a field of magic crystals. This occurred at the Ancients' Place, where fairies have since lived for thousands of years. There, they created a hierarchy, assigning each fairy to an area of the Earth: some to the oceans, some to the air, some to the weather, and some to dreams. The Fairy Lord directed everything and selected a Dream Librarian to record everything the fairies did, said, and decided. The first fairies used the Print Stones Machine to create the first volumes of fairy knowledge and history. These volumes were overseen by the Dream Librarian, who has later editions of the same volumes deep in the bowels of the Dream Library. New works and observations are created constantly.

Many years after the creation of the fairies, there was another spectacular astrological event. Three stars aligned in the heavens and then fell from the sky. The fairies took that as a sign that it was time to leave the Ancients' Place and spread out all over the world to run the realm in the ways they had determined. That was when some fairies assumed control over the dreams of mortals. With their sudden exodus, they left behind many structures that now help others understand the Way of the Ancient Fairies. Finally, after seeing a sign from the heavens, the fairies left the Ancients' Place. They still return to meditate upon their fairy origins. No mortals may enter this sacred place. Any who do enter cannot be allowed to leave, lest they divulge fairy information or history. Fairies have inbred for centuries, due to their system of arranged marriages. Few have gone out into the mortal world to live as mortals, and those who have are generally shunned. Once they infiltrated the Mortal World, fairies put their hands into everything. Their specialties and assigned duties were to watch over natural forces, such as wind and fire, tides and growth, and all matters plant-related. Initially, they did just that under the Fairy Lord's guidance and watchful eye. The Dream Librarian documented those natural events.

The Fairy Lord embarked on one of his usual quests, in one of his many disguises, during which he routinely checked on fairy functions and took care of problems within the realm. After paying a visit to the Fairies of the Deep, he vanished. For a long time, the Dream Librarian admitted to no one that the Fairy Lord was missing. She filled in diligently, making decisions, mediating disputes, and continuing to chronicle all fairy matters, but the tasks are too great, even for a fairy as learned as she. Deep down, she believes the Fairy Lord is gone, and that she must find a replacement desperately. None of the existing fairies can become Fairy Lord. Their baggage is too great, and their scope too limited. The Dream Librarian seeks someone with roots similar to those of the original Fairy Lord, who began as a mortal and became a fairy. Meanwhile, Lilith, the Fairy Queen of Dreams, took advantage of the Fairy Lord's disappearance by capturing a fairy named Fidget and putting the mortals of Wish under a dream spell.

=== Faye's Journey ===
Dream Chronicles, Dream Chronicles 2: The Eternal Maze and Dream Chronicles: The Chosen Child belong to the first trilogy of the series named Faye's Journey, telling the story of a mortal woman named Faye, who is the only person able to wake up from a dream spell placed on her town by a Fairy Queen, and who embarks on several dangerous quests to save her husband and daughter.

Lilith, the Fairy Queen of Dreams, casts a sleep spell upon the entire Village of Wish, causing every mortal there to fall into a magical sleep and allowing her to abduct a fairy named Fidget who was living there. Before his abduction, Fidget, using his remaining power, removes the sleep spell from Faye - his wife and the story’s heroine - and leaves a path for her to follow in his diary. Waking up from the dream, Faye starts to discover her in-law family's secret: they are all fairies. She also learns that all marriages are arranged in the Fairy Realm and that the concept of love was unknown there until Fidget's parents Aeval and Tangle fell in love. Fidget was betrothed to Lilith, but his parents chose to raise him in the Mortal Realm so he too could marry for love. Lilith, however, believes that her marriage to Fidget will strengthen her own powers as the Fairy Queen of Dreams: and ever since Fidget married Faye, Lilith has been crafting a plan to steal Fidget away. Faye meets a talking carnivorous plant named Herbert who, according to Fidget, is his mother's best friend. Leaving the comfort of her in-law's family and her hometown Village of Wish, Faye ventures outside on a lonely quest to save her husband, but she quickly becomes lost when the moon rises. Luckily, a sign guides her to Lilith's mansion, where Faye thinks Lilith is keeping her husband. She finds and reunites with Fidget momentarily, but Lilith appears and separates the couple a second time, bringing Fidget with her and casting another sleep spell upon Faye.

Lilith, having abducted Fidget again, sends Faye to a forgotten fairy prison from which no mortal has ever escaped. Waking up from Lilith's dream spell, Faye receives a diary from Aeval, her mother-in-law and the Fairy Queen of Flora, who then communicates through her plants to help Faye find a way out. Escaping from the prison, Faye explores the Ancients' Place, the fairy's birthplace, where they used to dwell. Looking at the nearest crystal ball, Aeval informs Faye that Lyra is no longer sleeping in her bed, and it is assumed that Lilith has taken her hostage. Aeval tells Faye to hurry, as Fidget's hope of being rescued is fading, and he may succumb to marrying Lilith. Faye meets and asks for help from an old friend of Aeval's named Merrow, an inventor who lives in the Mortal Realm. Arriving at Merrow's cottage, Faye discovers him to be a talking plant living in a secret lab. Merrow agrees to take Faye to the Tower of Dreams where, according to him, Fidget and Lyra are being held hostage by Lilith. Growing beside the Tower is a strange tree, but Merrow declares that "it's not important". Faye enters the enormous tower, a thing that no mortal had done before. She enters without Merrow's help as there are no plants inside for him to communicate through. Reaching the sixth and top floor, Faye finds a bed there, reminding her much of the bedroom in her own home. Exhausted and overwhelmed by nightmares, Faye just wants to have a nap, but as soon as she touches the bed, Aeval warns Faye that Merrow is a traitor, and she must escape from the tower. Faye jumps from the tower window and is caught by Aeval's vines. Aeval then leads Faye to the Eternal Tree, the tree she ignored at Merrow’s advice, beneath which Fidget, and Lyra are trapped. Faye enters the tree and finds a sleeping Fidget, and Lyra's favourite teddy bear. Aeval tells Faye to find a root potion from the Eternal Maze that will awaken Fidget. After Faye emerges from the Eternal Maze with the potion, the teddy bear vanishes. Faye gives the potion to Fidget, and they are finally reunited, but they must now find their missing daughter.

Faye is living in a tree house as Brenna, having lost all her memories of her previous adventures. Images of a strange man, a little girl, and an evil woman often appear in her dreams and frustrate Brenna. One day, waking up from a dream like this, Brenna finds a crystal ball in which a man - just like in her dreams - appears to urge her to find a girl named Lyra. Bewildered, Brenna listens to the strange man's advice and she says she can trust him. Brenna is led to a strange house owned by an herbalist through a magical nexus gateway. After concocting a memory recovery potion, Brenna finally remembers everything: herself Faye, her husband Fidget, her missing daughter Lyra, and her rival Lilith, the Fairy Queen of Dreams. Faye quickly goes to rescue her daughter, following clues left to her by someone unknown. She learns that Lilith is hiding in a retreat beneath the sea. As Faye feels closer to Lyra, she knows that she must continue. After going under the sea, traveling through many strange rooms and two labyrinths, Faye arrives at Lilith's retreat and meets her. Faye demands to know where Lyra is. Lilith calmly tells Faye that the Dream Librarian has abducted Lyra, believing her to be the Chosen Child of prophecy. This prophecy states that a half-fairy, half-mortal child will replace the missing Fairy Lord. Lilith reveals that she has been the one guiding Faye all along and that she refuses to accept Lyra as her Fairy Lord. Suddenly, Lilith offers to help Faye bring Lyra back. Aware that Lilith has her own "selfish interests at heart", Faye still accepts her help. Going back to the Enchanted Tree, Faye takes Lyra's teddy bear and brings Lyra back to her home in Wish. Faye's family is finally reunited. A new life has already opened for them. Faye says these fairy adventures will haunt her dreams forever. One thing she didn't know is that Lilith was pregnant and no one knows exactly what Lilith is up to.

=== Lyra's Destiny ===
Dream Chronicles: The Book of Air, Dream Chronicles: The Book of Water and Dream Chronicles: The Book of Fire belong to the second trilogy of the series named Lyra's Destiny, telling the story of a young mortal girl named Lyra who embarks on many unforeseen quests, just like her mother Faye used to do, to reveal and to accept her unique destiny: become the new Fairy Lord.

The day before her 18th birthday, Lyra, Faye and Fidget's daughter, a half-mortal, half-fairy girl, has a strange dream. All her friends and family are present, and her grandfather Tangle says he has an amazing gift, but then Lyra hears a whisper, and everyone disappears. Lyra stays alone in her beloved town of Wish, trapped in a parallel dimension which is very similar to her own. Guided by the messages left by Tangle and using her father's airship, Lyra tries to find the Clockmaker, the only person who can help Lyra get back home and reunite with her family and friends. She finally finds the Clockmaker in his hideout, and he agrees to help her. Lyra must find 3 keys in 3 separately hidden areas - the Treehouse Village, the Wind Music Island and the Water Collector - to re-activate the Clockmaker's Time Synchronization Machine. Upon arriving in the Wind Music Island, Lyra is notified that the music eons in this island was once created by fairies who used to live there. Lyra finds her grandfather's note confusing, but she gradually believes what is happening with her is touched by fairies' hands: the magical chalkboard, the hidden airship, the strange whisper, not including those powerful powers that Lyra discovers by herself. After finding all 3 keys, Lyra returns to the Clockmaker's house to finish her mission there and can finally head back to her original dimension, though with many questions that are yet to be answered. Instead of welcoming Lyra with sunshine, the Village of Wish becomes dark and full of thunder. Lyra wonders what will be waiting her next.

When Lyra arrives at the Village of Wish, the thunderstorm causes her airship to crash at the Wish Town gate. Lyra finds a note which tells her that Lilith has cast a storm spell over the entire Village, and everyone left except for Fidget, who is ill. Lyra arrives home to find that the Founder of Wish statue has changed to the figure of a woman, and that Fidget is in a deep sleep. She finds a note of Faye's handwriting telling her that Lilith is looking for a book called the Book of Water. Fidget managed to send it to the Barge City when Tangle, Lyra's grandfather, deceived Lilith. Lilith found out the truth and cast the spell that changed Fidget's life into a terrible storm. Fairies can't kill but Lilith's son, Kenrick, who is a half-fairy like Lyra, destroyed Tangle. Lyra goes to the herbalist, to make a potion to save Fidget, and returns to Wish, but the potion makes Fidget's illness worse. The only chance to save him is to break Lilith's spell. Lyra goes to the Barge City and finds the Book of Water, which tells that the only way to break the spell is to find seven magic figurines and put them in the seven caves of the Crater of Time. Then, she must collect seven magic symbols and place them in the center of the Power of Spell, but three of the figurines have been destroyed during a human Great War, and Lyra discovers that four other figurines have been hidden by Faye. Lyra goes to find the four figurines in different places: the Barge City, the Obelisk, and the Merrow House. The Clockmaker tells Lyra that the final figurine is in the Herbalist's backyard, in exchange for the last page of the Book of Fire. Lyra finds all of them, takes the seven magic symbols, and places them at Lilith's statue at Wish. With the storm gone, Fidget recovers but Faye does not return.

== Characters ==
The first four people listed below are the main characters; the rest are recurring characters. In the Dream Chronicles series, characters normally only appear in cut-scenes, but there are some exceptions: Fidget appears in person in the last scene of both Dream Chronicles and Dream Chronicles 2, and Lilith appears in the 24th scene of The Chosen Child.

- Faye is a mortal woman who is the protagonist of the Faye's Journey trilogy. Waking up from a dream, Faye discovers that everyone in the Village of Wish is falling into a magical sleep spell, and that her family has already vanished. Faye embarks on a dangerous and lonely quest to rescue both her husband Fidget and her daughter Lyra, and is finally able to save them. On the quest, Faye explores many secrets about her in-laws' family: their identities, their fairy roots, and many of the Dream Realm's mysteries. According to her husband, Faye is a smart, strong, and persistent woman, who never gives up hope and always tries hard to get her family back to their old peaceful days. Though the main character, Faye doesn't appear in person because the players play from her point of view. She is briefly seen sitting in the gondola in The Chosen Child.
- Lilith is the Fairy Queen of Dreams, the daughter of the Fairy King of Darkness and the Fairy Queen of Night. She is the primary antagonist of the first Faye's Journey trilogy. Lilith was betrothed to Fidget before he married Faye and is determined to claim Fidget as her husband. She repeatedly abducts Fidget, as she believes marrying him will make her powers stronger. Lilith also casts an enchanting sleep spell on everyone in the Village of Wish to make sure that her plans go smoothly and so no one can disturb her bringing Fidget back to the Land of Fairies forever. She first appears only in cut-scenes. Lilith finally appears in person in The Chosen Child to reveal Lyra's fate with Faye and is implied to be hatching other evil schemes for the future.
- Fidget is the beloved teacher in the Village of Wish and the son of parents once highly revered in the fairy world. His parents broke from fairy tradition and married out of love. Considered outcasts, they settled in the mortal town of Wish. He was raised as a mortal, though born a fairy. As Fidget grows older, his parents tell him of his roots and teach him the Way of the Fairy. Fidget is well educated by his parents, both in matters of his mortal world and matters of the fairy world. He followed in his parents' footsteps and fled an arranged fairy marriage to Lilith to follow his heart. The secret of his fairy roots was safe until Lilith snatched him away. Already being aware of Lilith's evil plans, Fidget tried to protect his family but when things go wrong, Lilith abducts him and brings him to the Dream Realm. She finally releases Fidget at the end of Dream Chronicles 2, but she sends him into a crystal ball. Fidget has appeared in all Dream Chronicles games, and also acts as Faye's guide in the original Dream Chronicles.
- Lyra is the half-fairy, half-mortal daughter of Faye and Fidget. Lyra falls into Lilith's sleep spell like everyone else in the Village of Wish in the original game and is then kidnapped by Lilith before she releases Fidget. Lyra is believed to be the Chosen Child who is prophesied to replace the missing Fairy Lord. Her destiny is revealed at the end of The Chosen Child. Lyra plays a minor role and only appears three times in each Faye's Journey trilogy's game, but in the second series, she replaces her mother Faye as the central character.
- Aeval, Fairy Queen of Flora, is Fidget's mother and Faye's mother-in-law. She fell in love with Tangle, and they escaped to the Mortal Realm together. Aeval talks to plants and they talk to her. There are plants throughout the Mortal and Fairy Realms; they can communicate with each other through their root systems, through fallen leaves captured by the wind fairies, and through pollen and seeds carried by the water fairies. All these plants ultimately communicate with Aeval. If there is trouble far away, the plants are able to transmit this information to Aeval. Her best friend is a carnivorous plant named Herbert. She and her plants try to help Faye find Fidget in Dream Chronicles 2.
- Tangle, Fairy King of Knowledge, is Fidget's father and Faye's father-in-law. He and Aeval escaped to the Mortal Realm together to make sure that their children would be brought up naturally and humanly. As Fairy King of Knowledge, reading books is his "endless pursuit", according to Fidget. Tangle was the Dream Librarian's most devoted student and is almost as knowledgeable as her. Tangle has the advantage of knowing more of mortal life, having lived in the mortal world for so long, but the Dream Librarian knows more of the Fairy Ways. Tangle did not appear in the first series, but he plays as Lyra's guide in The Book of Air. Like his wife, Aeval, he is only mentioned and plays a minor role in the first trilogy. In The Book of Water, Lilith attacked the Family a few days before Lyra came back. Lilith was searching for a book called The Book of Water when she attacked. While distracting them, Fidget opened a portal to Barge City and threw the book there to protect it. Since Fairies cannot kill each other, Lilith ordered her 10-year-old half-fairy, half-mortal son, Kenrick, to kill Tangle, which he did. Tangle is the first character to die in the series.
- Merrow is a fairy who left the Fairy Realm to pursue the study of science without the interference of magic. This angered Lilith's mother, who stripped him of his fairy powers. When Tangle and Aeval escaped with baby Fidget, Merrow helped them. In gratitude, Aeval gave him the ability to communicate with plants. Though he is eccentric, he is knowledgeable, and knows secret passages into the Fairy Realm, and only he can guide a mortal there. In Dream Chronicles 2, he - as an insect-eating plant – helps Faye to reach the Tower of Dreams and then disappears mysteriously.
- Dream Librarian holds all knowledge, history, and wisdom, and uses it to create countless volumes of books in her enormous library. She has, or can easily find, the answers to every question involving the Fairy Realm. Because of her vast knowledge, she is the primary advisor to the Fairy Lord. Lilith reveals that the Dream Librarian believes that Lyra was the Chosen Child, and that she is actually the one who's tried to separate Faye and Fidget. This character doesn't appear, having only been mentioned by Lilith and through Dream Jewels' secrets in Dream Chronicles 2.

== Setting ==
KatGames designed a mystical world of realistic fantasy where mortal and fairy realms collide for the Dream Chronicles series, which no casual game developer has done before. In every game, players have to travel back-and-forth between the two realms and gradually discover the history of each location. The series is set in an illustrated fantasy world with a floral/woodsy theme to many items, from architecture to furniture. The early games in the series follow the adventures of Faye as she tries to rescue her daughter Lyra. Beginning with the fourth game, The Book of Air, Lyra becomes the protagonist in a series of adventures that charts a new direction for the franchise, although the essential style of puzzles (primarily hidden object games) and gameplay remain consistent. There are many notable locations in the series:

- The Village of Wish: This is where Faye lives with her husband Fidget, her daughter Lyra, and Fidget's parents, Tangle and Aeval. It is an insular place, far from cities and civilization. The town is surrounded by tall walls, not to keep the residents inside - for they have no desire to leave the safety and warmth of their community - but to protect from the outside world. The gates are secured with complex weighted locks first seen in Dream Chronicles. The streets are cobbled, lined with colorful dwellings and stores. Beyond the walls of Wish lie lush forests and winding roads that lead to other, larger, towns, but the folk of Wish have little desire to visit those distant places. Their homes are secured in their beloved village where they believe no harm can come to them. Before Faye, no one had left this village in many years. This is where Faye begins her journey.
- Lilith's Mansion: This is Lilith's temporary home. In the original Dream Chronicles, she executed her plans to kidnap Fidget from this location.
- The Forgotten Prison: There are 3 chambers in this prison. Fairies that fought the elements of nature were imprisoned here. This is where Faye begins her journey in Dream Chronicles 2.
- The Ancient's Place: The birthplace of the Fairy race, Fairies have kept its location secret from mortals for thousands of years. It is protected by an impenetrable force field, making it an ideal spot for Lilith to imprison a mortal like Faye in Dream Chronicles 2.
- The Mortal Maze: A tunnel that leads from the Fairy Realm to the Mortal Realm.
- Merrow's Cottage: Merrow's cottage was once a sanctuary for fairies escaping into the Mortal Realm.
- The Tower of Dreams: It holds all the knowledge, wisdom, history, and insight of the fairies. Because of the value of its contents, it is guarded by five ancient Fairy Knights and each floor is protected by ingenious locks. The upper floor is where dreams can be made and watched. In Dream Chronicles 2, Merrow believes that Lilith is holding Fidget and Lyra on that floor. The Eternal Maze lies near this tower.
- The Eternal Maze: As a final safeguard so that no mortal could ever enter or leave the Ancients' Place, the fairies created an underground maze with no light and no map, but this made fairy passage almost impossible as well, and so some of the fairies created a map to help them find their way between realms.
- The Treehouse Village: The people of this village believe that strange occurrences will befall them if they don't live high in treetops. This is where Faye begins her journey in The Chosen Child. This is also a part of the green belt that runs through the fairy world. It is all part of Aeval's plant network. Though others doubt it, Aeval always knew that the trees saw and remembered everything. Over time they have been used to hide treasures and secrets. In The Book of Air, someone within the fairy world has turned the trees to gold, keeping them from "speaking" with Aeval. The trees are being used to protect a key, the item that the Clockmaker needs to fix his Time Synchronization Machine. Lyra must help the trees in order for the trees to help her in return.
- The Nexus Gateway: The transportation hub that Fairies use to travel quickly from the Fairy Realm to the Mortal Realm. In The Chosen Child, players can travel to 6 locations from here: The Treehouse Village, the Herbalist's House, the Observatory, the Village of Wish (Faye's House), the Underwater Retreat, and the Eternal Maze.
- The Observatory: The magic telescope is used to convert constellations into molds. Molds are used in the Forge to create Dream Jewels to open new places in the Nexus Gateway.
- The Herbalist's House: The herbalist is a mortal who acquired fairy knowledge and experimented with potions from various plants. Known for his expertise in potion-making, the Herbalist has recipes for powerful magical concoctions.
- The Underwater Retreat: Expectant Fairy Mothers travel to this spa-like retreat to rest and restore their magical powers. In The Chosen Child, after releasing Fidget, Lilith decides to go there to restore as she's pregnant, buut she still sends notes, instructions, and a crystal ball, to help Faye unite with Lyra.
- The Clockmaker's House: A distant frozen tundra where the Clockmaker, a powerful yet solitary fairy, synchronizes time both in the mortal and fairy worlds. The low temperatures at the Clockmaker's House are useful for slowing any clocks that might consider racing ahead. The eternal snow keeps the Clockmaker's machines pristine. No plants grow in his frozen wasteland, but long ago Aeval brought him flowers from a more hospitable climate, and their image is now pressed into various pieces throughout the Clockmaker's domain.
- The Wind Music Island: The place where fairies created the first music, using the instruments that can be found there. Mortal music, it is said, is born when mortals hear bits of fairy music while they sleep. In the distance, looming ominously, is the Tower of Dreams, where Faye searched for Fidget in Dream Chronicles 2. Before the fairies moved on from Wind Music Island, they created a stone instrument band—musical instruments of stone that played music on their own so that the music would continue forever.
- The Water Collector: This is the basis of the infrastructure for fairy civilization. Here water is collected, purified, and dispersed. For many years Aeval took a proprietary interest in the Water Collector, to be certain all plants were adequately nourished. There is a system inside the cottage which tests not only the purity of the water but the number of elements within each measure of water. Water from different sources carries different properties, which are utilized by fairies responsible for different aspects of the world.
- The Barge City: An enchanting fishing village built over the water, far south of the Village of Wish, it is the home of many fishermen and merchants, who live in houses floating on water, connected by wooden boardwalks.
- The Obelisk: This imposing structure conceals a magical figurine used in The Book of Water, but it is not easy to access or open. This is also an arid and quiet place, in the middle of the desert, but people must still live in those houses carved into the rocks.
- The Crater of Time: This barren area holds the seven magic symbols needed to stop the Eternal Storm spell in The Book of Water. They are locked inside seven mysterious caves.

== Gameplay ==
When players enter a room or any location for the first time, Faye/Lyra makes an entry statement to set players on the right track. Almost all the objects in the room can be described to players by Faye/Lyra; players just need to click on them, and they'll have a statement with a probable hint. Clicking items places them in your inventory at the bottom of the screen. Once there, players can use these items on other objects and combine them to solve the various conundrums encountered in each location. In the first Dream Chronicles game, unlike in most hard-core adventures, players never carry around any unnecessary inventory items: all the items players collect can be used only within the location players found them, but not in future puzzles. Solve the puzzle at hand and players unlock the door to the next location. Starting in Dream Chronicles 2, the items that players find may be used in scenes other than the ones in which they were found. Objects will stay in the player's inventory until needed. All items that players are able to pick up will serve a purpose, whether they are used in the scene in which they are found or not. Some items may not become visible in a scene immediately, with players needing to perform other tasks before they become visible.

Each Dream Chronicles game consists of a series of puzzles that the player must solve to reach the next chapter. Most involve searching for and making use of hidden objects, while others include logic puzzles, jigsaw puzzles, word unscrambling puzzles, and mazes. The whole game covers a wide range of game types, including adventure/role-playing. Players are given hints as to how to proceed and some brief instructions, but they need to work out what is actually required themselves. Every puzzle or item in each Dream Chronicles game is blended well with context and the Dream Realm-themed story. The game is separated into many segments and there is a cut-scene between each of these. Cut-scenes in the Dream Chronicles series are often cinematic, wide-screen briefs, which tell the story from Faye/Lyra's point of view. Only a few characters appear directly in these.

Throughout each game, the players also find various coloured or transparent gems. These are Dream Pieces, gems that make up the unique Dream Jewels collection. Each Dream Chronicles game has its own different Dream Jewels collection with different names, shapes, and usages. Completion of Dream Jewels is necessary to complete each game in the series. In the original Dream Chronicles, 8 Dream Jewels give detailed information about Fairies and their roles in the Dream Realm. In Dream Chronicles 2, 15 Dream Jewels answer and explain many dark secrets about Lilith, Lyra, and the Dream Realm. In The Chosen Child, 10 Dream Jewels are used to open new areas. Finally, in The Book of Air, Dream Jewels come with special powers. Finding and completing Dream Jewels also adds to the player's score at the end of the game. There are numerous Dream Pieces molding some exact numbers of Dream Jewels to complete in each Dream Chronicles game. The Dream Jewels collection is a unique element of Dream Chronicles. Though often being credited for borrowing Myst concepts, in fact, Dream Chronicles is one of the earliest casual game series which has adventure elements combining with hidden object proportions.

The gameplay in Dream Chronicles sequels is largely the same as the original Dream Chronicles, though more complex. In Dream Chronicles 2, in order to solve puzzles, players can go back-and-forth among relative scenes in a separate area. In The Chosen Child, players can travel to any of the 7 areas in-game by using the nexus gateway. In The Book of Air, players control their traveling by using Fidget's airship to explore the Dream Realm.

At the end of each game, the player earns a score, mostly based on how quickly players can solve the puzzles and how fast they finish the game, but each instalment has its different extra count. In the original Dream Chronicles, players only need to find and complete the Dream Jewels collection to earn a high score, along with solving puzzles quickly. In Dream Chronicles 2, they have to solve Dream Jewels secrets to do this. In The Chosen Child, they have to find extra gold nuggets.

== Main games ==
The series is mainly designed and developed by KatGames and released first by their direct publisher PlayFirst.

Game title(s)
Game title(s)	Release date(s)	Platform(s)
Dream Chronicles	June 12, 2007	Windows, Mac OS X, iOS, Nintendo DS, Mobile, PS3, Xbox 360
In Dream Chronicles, Faye has to find her missing husband and escape the mysterious sleeping spell that has taken over the town of Wish.
Dream Chronicles 2: The Eternal Maze	February 14, 2008	Windows, Mac OS X, iOS
Locked away within the Ancients' Place by Lilith, Fairy Queen of Dreams, Faye continues her quest to reunite with her beloved husband, Fidget.
Dream Chronicles: The Chosen Child	April 16, 2009	Windows, Mac OS X, iOS
In The Chosen Child, Faye goes to save her daughter from the clutches of Lilith and reveal the secret prophecy of the Chosen Child.
Dream Chronicles: The Book of Air	June 24, 2010	Windows, Mac OS X, iOS
In The Book of Air, Lyra, Faye's daughter, finds herself trapped in a strange dimension on the day before her 18th birthday. Following clues sent by her grandfather, she flies across the realm in search of the Clockmaker who will help her restore time and return home.
Dream Chronicles: The Book of Water	April 24, 2011	Windows, Mac OS X, iOS
In The Book of Water, a devastating storm has hit the village of Wish, and Lyra has to find a way to lift the evil curse and save her hometown.

== Reception and influences ==
Since the first release in June 2007, the series has garnered mostly positive reviews from game critics for its visuals, audio, dream-themed story, characters, and puzzles.

Gamezebo, a casual game review site, rated the original Dream Chronicles 5/5 stars. Chuck Miller praised the title and said: "It's best described as a casual cousin to epic, hard-core adventures like Myst and Uru. A mix of fantasy and reality, its hypnotic dreamland engages you in a larger-than-life quest, a mystery that needs to be solved one puzzle at a time as the story unfolds around you. [...] Dream Chronicles has all the necessary ingredients of an exceptional game, one that lives up to its marketing hype. Art Nouveau graphics are beautifully rendered, an ethereal soundtrack helps bring the world to life, its engaging narrative draws you into the story and diverse puzzles of varying difficulty keep play interesting and challenging. [...] In short, solving Dream Chronicles's mysteries is a thoroughly enjoyable experience". Dream Chronicles was honored as one of the best casual games of 2007 in the annual Top Games list by Gamezebo's editors, and won a "Zeebys" award for People's Choice for the "Best Hidden Object & Adventure Game of 2007" as well placing at number one in 2007 customer favorites by Big Fish Games.

The two sequels, Dream Chronicles 2 and The Chosen Child, enjoyed the same success on many major casual game charts and accolades from critics.

Awem Studio praised Dream Chronicles 2: "The artwork is gorgeously dreamy, and it adds some special coloring to the entire atmosphere of mystery and enigma and is a true feature of Dream Chronicles games. ... The visual and sound aspects are greatly satisfying and create a real Dream World. Dream Chronicles 2: The Eternal Maze is one of those games that will be engraved in your memory and win over your heart". In July 2009, Dream Chronicles 2 was honoured with 2 awards by RealArcade, "Top Adventure Game of 2008" and "Best World Design", in their first Great Games Awards.

John Bardinelli of Jay Is Games said in his review of The Chosen Child: "The latest instalment in the Dream Chronicles series ... [is] as breathtakingly brilliant as everyone would expect. A little bit of hidden object finding, a little bit of puzzle solving, and a whole lot of adventuring can be found in this superb sequel, along with some of the most gorgeous scenery you've seen since looking out your own window (assuming you live in a fantasy world with fairies, fountains, and vibrant gardens). ... These [Dream Chronicles] titles just keep getting better and better. It's a perfect blend of object finding and adventure gameplay, and the puzzles are constructed so cleverly you might even giggle when you think of the solution. And I swear you'll melt from the combination of the gorgeous visuals and enchanting music". In late 2009, The Chosen Child was placed at number two 2009 customer favourites by Big Fish Games.

Criticism generally focuses on the first and fourth games, for their short length. Gamezebo's Erin Bell once stated: "The length is disappointing when compared to other adventure games, even while acknowledging the attention to detail that care that KatGames put into every scene and puzzle".

As of July 2009, the first three games had been downloaded more than 30 million times.

The second trilogy Lyra's Destiny, started with The Book of Air. Though the game proved to be another commercial success, it garnered many lukewarm reviews, which criticized it for not matching the standards of the previous games. Some reviews praised its Dream Chronicles-trademarked high-quality production values and tricky gameplay, while negative reviews focused on its short length (only 16 main scenes, shorter than the original Dream Chronicles) and some repetitive puzzles.

As PlayFirst had initially announced and The Book of Water's final scenes implied, there would be a sequel called Dream Chronicles: The Book of Fire to be released, but soon after The Book of Water was released, since July 2011, PlayFirst canceled releasing casual games on PC/Mac platforms in order to focus on its growing mobile gaming market. Because PlayFirst holds Dream Chronicles trademarks, KatGames must have their approval in order to develop a new sequel, thus KatGames had to move on with other projects. Due to that cancellation, The Book of Fire will not be developed and released, and The Book of Water was the last collaboration between PlayFirst and KatGames. Furthermore, due to that early cancellation, the game's development time was cut short to fit PlayFirst's game schedule. KatGames had to reuse several previous games' scenes, background music, and sound effects. The animation was not designed in 3D as KatGames did in previous games. Some puzzles were also cut short and lacked difficulty towards the end and even the same voice-over was used for both Lyra and Faye; thus, overall making The Book of Water felt unfinished and simplistic.

=== Critical reception ===
Game title(s)	Gamezebo's rating(s)	Jay Is Games' rating(s)
Dream Chronicles	100%	90%
Dream Chronicles 2: The Eternal Maze	90%	92%
Dream Chronicles: The Chosen Child	80%	92%
Dream Chronicles: The Book of Air	70%	90%
Dream Chronicles: The Book of Water	40%	88%

=== Awards and nominations ===
- Dream Chronicles

- Big Fish Games — "2nd Runner-Up Best Puzzle Game of 2007" (nominated)

- 2008 Zeeby Second Annual Casual Game Awards — "People's Choice Award for the Best Hidden Object & Adventure Game of 2007" (won)

- Dream Chronicles 2: The Eternal Maze

- 2009 RealGame Great Game Awards — "Top Adventure Game of 2008" (won)

- 2009 RealGame Great Game Awards — "Best World Design" (won)

- Dream Chronicles: The Chosen Child

- 2010 GameHouse Great Game Awards — "Top Hidden Object Game of 2009" (nominated)

- 2010 GameHouse Great Game Awards — "Best Story" (nominated)

- Dream Chronicles: The Book of Air

- Big Fish Games - "2nd Runner-Up Best Adventure Game of 2010" (nominated)
