= Game Pass =

Game Pass may refer to:

- Xbox Game Pass
- NFL Game Pass
- GamePass, a subscription service by GameHouse
- Game Pass (Colorado), a mountain pass in Larimer County, Colorado, United States
- Game Pass (Montana), a mountain pass in Granite County, Montana, United States

== See also ==
- Battle pass
- Season pass (video games)
