= Mortimer Beckett =

Video game series

- Genre: hidden object/adventure
- Developer: Paprikari
- Publisher: GameHouse
- Platforms: Microsoft Windows, Mac OS X, iPad, Nintendo Wii
- First release: Mortimer Beckett and the Secrets of Spooky Manor; 2007
- Latest release: Mortimer Beckett and the Book of Gold; 2017

Mortimer Beckett Release Timeline
2007	Mortimer Beckett and the Secrets of the Spooky Manor
2008	Mortimer Beckett and the Time Paradox
2009
2010	Mortimer Beckett and the Lost King
2011
2012	Mortimer Beckett and the Crimson Thief
2013
2014
2015
2016
2017	Mortimer Beckett and the Book of Gold

Mortimer Beckett is a hidden-object video game series following Mortimer going on various sci-fiction, fantasy, and mysterious adventures.

The main plot is always to find items to advance to higher chapters. Also, there are items called "puzzle pieces" which allow interaction with other characters, items, and animals. In the first two games and the last one, the objects are broken down into pieces and scattered throughout the different sections of chapters. In the third and fourth games the only difference is that pieces are not broken down, making it more like an I spy game.

As of 2013, all released games have been ported to the iPad, and the first game has additionally been ported to Nintendo Wii.

== Games ==
The games are:

- Mortimer Beckett and the Secrets of Spooky Manor, in which Mortimer helps his uncle to get rid of ghosts, by retrieving pieces of the Ghost Machine which have been hidden all over the manor. The cut scenes are 2D and read like a comic book.

- Mortimer Beckett and the Time Paradox, in which Mortimer has to travel through time to retrieve pieces of a timebomb that fell through a portal in his uncle's manor. The cut scenes are 2D, in which Mortimer falls into the next time zone.

- Mortimer Beckett and the Lost King, in which Mortimer wakes up from his final travel through the time portal from the previous game and learns that he has to find the eight jewels of a powerful crown, with which he can locate the kingdom's lost king. The cut scenes are 3D, in which Mortimer travels to a new location.

- Mortimer Beckett and the Crimson Thief, in which Mortimer has to find and return valuable art pieces that were stolen by a mysterious thief.

- Mortimer Beckett and the Book of Gold, in which Mortimer joins Kate O'Malley in order to find the book of gold.

== Reception ==
The first game had mixed reviews, according to Metacritic. Adan Ballard of IGN gave the game a 6.2/10, noting that "there's not a lot to Spooky Manor, but that doesn't stop it from being fun to play", while Francesca Dimola of Nintendo World Report rated it a 3/10 due to "a poor graphical presentation, and little-to-no replay value".

The fourth game was rated 3.5/5 by Gamezebo's Brandy Shaul, who criticized the story as being "shallow and under-developed", but praised the puzzles as being "challenging enough to be satisfying".
