= Awem =

Video games developer

Awem Games
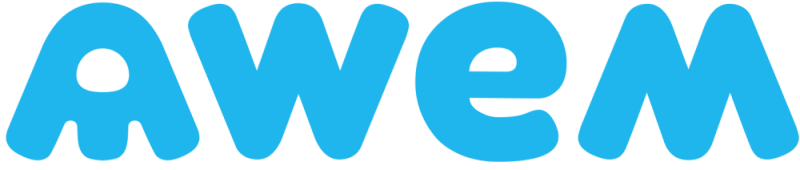
- Company type: Private
- Industry: Computer software Casual games
- Founded: 2002
- Headquarters: Paphos, Cyprus
- Key people: Oleg Rogovenko, CEO
- Number of employees: 157 (2018)
- Website: awem.com

Awem Games is a game developer of casual games and is based in Paphos, Cyprus. The company produced shareware PC games in 2002. From 2011 onward, they began developing free-to-play mobile games.

== Games ==
=== Shoot 'em ups ===
- Star Defender (2002) is a series of four side-scrolling arcade-style shoot 'em ups.
- Alien Stars (2005) is a shoot 'em up game.

=== Puzzle games ===
==== Cradle series ====
- Cradle Of Rome (2007) is a match-3 puzzle game with city building mechanics.
- Cradle Of Persia (2007) is a similar puzzle game set in Ancient Persia.
- Cradle Of Rome 2 (2010) is a match-3 puzzle game sequel to Cradle Of Rome.
- Cradle Of Egypt (2011) continued the Cradle series.
- Cradle of Empires (2014) is an adventure game.
- Cradle of Maya (2023).

==== Hidden object games ====
- Romance Of Rome (2009) is set in the Roman Empire with a romantic storyline.
- Golden Trails: The New Western Rush (2010) has a wild west theme.
- Golden Trails 2: The Lost Legacy (2011) – the sequel to Golden Trails: The New Western Rush has a pirate theme.
- Letters from Nowhere (2010) is a puzzle/adventure game.
- Letters from Nowhere 2 (2011), the sequel to Letters from Nowhere.
- Letters From Nowhere: A Hidden Object Mystery (2014) was the first of Awem's hidden object games to be released free-to-play to mobile platforms.

=== Simulation games ===
- The Island: Castaway (2010) is an adventure/simulation casual game.
- The Island: Castaway 2 (2011) is a sequel to The Island: Castaway.
