= PlayFirst =

Video game publisher

PlayFirst, Inc.
- PlayFirst logo (2004-2014)
- Type: Private
- Industry: Video games
- Founded: 2004
- Founders: John Welch; Brad Edelman; Jason Rubinstein
- Headquarters: Delaware, United States
- Key people: Kenny Shea Dinkin; (CCO); Marco DeMiroz; (CEO); Bruce Sherrod; (VPE)
- Products: Casual game
- Parent: Glu Mobile (2014–2021); EA Mobile (2021–present)
- Website: PlayFirst.com

PlayFirst, Inc. is a Delaware based American publisher of casual games founded in 2004 by industry veterans. PlayFirst produced the Diner Dash series, which won the 2008 Annual Casual Game Awards. and has seen over 550 million downloads. The popularity of Diner Dash series prompted spin-off series like Wedding Dash and Cooking Dash. The company’s game portfolio also includes the retro-style strategy-based Chocolatier series, and the adventure/hidden object-mixing Dream Chronicles series.

From 2005 to mid-2011, PlayFirst have released 72 casual games for PC and Mac, counting extra 7 Collector's Editions and Strategy Guides, thus they have 79 games in total in their game categories. PlayFirst was acquired by Glu Mobile in September 2014, while Glu Mobile itself was acquired by Electronic Arts in April 2021.

== History ==
=== 2004–2010: Early days, breakthrough, and maintaining the success of Dash series ===
PlayFirst’s biggest commercial success was its first game, Diner Dash, which was released for the first time on PC/Mac platforms in late 2004. Diner Dash was initially developed by Gamelab, a New York-based casual game developer, under a multi-title publishing agreement with PlayFirst. The success of Diner Dash with game critics and gamers prompted PlayFirst to release four sequels in the following years: Restaurant Rescue (2006), Flo on the Go (2006), Hometown Hero (2007), and the fifth BOOM! in 2010.

PlayFirst has also published Diner Dash across multiple platforms, including PC, Mac, iPhone, iPad, Facebook and consoles DS, Xbox, and Wii. PlayFirst games are available on more than 500 sites in 20 languages.

Spin-off series and games Wedding Dash (2007), Cooking Dash (2008), and Hotel Dash (2009) were released. However, they mostly earned lukewarm receptions from game critics and gamers.

Other non-Dash PlayFirst games includes the three-part, retro-style strategy-based Chocolatier series, which was released during 2007 and 2009 in collaboration with Big Splash Games. The five-part, adventure/hidden object-mixing Dream Chronicles series was another highlight in PlayFirst's portfolio. Dream Chronicles was released during 2007 and 2011 in collaboration with KatGames.

=== 2010–2015: Cancellation of releasing on PC/Mac and new direction ===
In October 2010, PlayFirst announced a focus on the mobile and social market after raising $9.2 million from investors, and cancelled releasing further casual games in the near future. PlayFirst's forays into the social gaming market have proven unsuccessful, as low user counts forced the company to cancel all of its Facebook games, Diner Dash and Chocolatier, not long after launching them.

As of late 2010, the company employed more than 100 workers, but laid off an unspecified number of its employees in early December 2011 due to "restructuring". Other social games veterans who joined the company in late 2010 from Playdom and Zynga have also left; however, PlayFirst claims the layoffs will not change its emphasis on the mobile market.

On October 8, 2012, PlayFirst emailed its subscribers informing them that the company will cease the production of PC and Mac games and move to a new website since November 12, 2012. The email read, "We have established a firm position as one of the leading producers for iOS mobile applications and are currently working on implementing our games into the Android marketplace," and that current games in its catalogue will still be available for purchase on the third party websites like Big Fish Games and GameHouse.

On September 3, 2014, PlayFirst was acquired by Glu Mobile. The official statement from Glu Mobile CEO, Niccolo de Masi, read "We are pleased to officially add PlayFirst to the Glu family and look forward to delivering new DASH products to a worldwide audience," Glu Mobile was later acquired by Electronic Arts in April 2021, who consolidated all Glu Mobile operations into EA Mobile.

== Playground SDK ==
Playground SDK is PlayFirst's game engine. It is discontinued.
