= RealArcade =

Defunct gaming service

RealArcade (formerly RealOne Arcade) was a gaming service operated by RealNetworks that distributed casual computer games. The platform, launched in 2001, allowed users to download demo versions of games before purchasing full titles. RealNetworks expanded the service to mobile carriers in 2005. RealArcade ceased operations in 2009 following its merger with GameHouse.

== History ==
=== First iteration of RealArcade ===
Prior to the development of RealArcade, RealNetworks had been offering downloadable games as Real.com Games since April 2000, amassing three million downloads by May 2001. Development on RealArcade began in 1999 under Ted Woolsey. The service was announced for developers in March 2001, with a consumer launch set for the second quarter. Over 30 developers were involved, including GameHouse.

On May 14, 2001, RealNetworks launched the beta version of RealArcade in an attempt to diversify its core business assets. The service was created to take advantage of the growth of the video game industry and would be used as a platform to boost PC game sales in a market dominated by console games. Games were set to be priced between $10 and $20. RealNetworks was not the first company to do so, as Shockwave.com had started selling games using a similar model the week before.

RealArcade was set to launch with 120 games; by October 2001, there were 170 games available. An e-commerce version, RealArcade Gold, was released on October 10, 2001, with subscribers receiving a $100 credit towards purchases made on the platform. RealArcade Gold also launched with a video game rental service. On launch, eleven titles were available, with plans to add three to four new titles per month. The company predicted a potential European user base of approximately 30 million users, which was the same amount of users RealPlayer had.

On March 1, 2002, StarHub Internet became the first ISP in Singapore to distribute the service. On March 20, 2002, six new language editions of RealArcade's website launched in a move to increase its international user base: French, Italian, German, Dutch, Spanish and Portuguese. At the time, the program had been downloaded 4.5 million times, with a total of 15 million game downloads and 450,000 purchases. The company had partnered with Telstra, StarHub, Tiscali and Rede Brasil Sul to distribute its games, either through their online portals or physically on CDs.

=== RealONE Arcade ===
On July 1, 2002, coinciding with the rebrand of RealPlayer to RealONE Player, RealArcade was renamed RealONE Arcade, and the Game Pass service was added. In October, it entered an agreement with Vivendi Universal's Flipside unit, enabling access to Flipside's games for RealONE Arcade subscribers. A similar agreement with Sega followed in November 2002 to provide ten emulated Sega Genesis games for download, were made available in January 2003. The Sega game catalog increased during 2003 with the addition of new titles. The service launched the RealOne Arcade Game Developer Showdown in March 2003, with the winner receiving both the opportunity to release the game on RealOne Arcade and a prize of $100,000, and a prize of $25,000 for the two runners-up. The winning title was Jammed Again!

The success of RealOne Arcade in 2003 led to profits for shareware game developers such as PopCap Games and GarageGames. Revenue of RealNetworks' games unit skyrocketed in the third quarter of the year.

=== Second iteration of RealArcade and closure ===
With the acquisition of GameHouse (one of its first providers) in January 2004, the software reverted to its initial name RealArcade. The following month, it announced a deal with Cablevision's Optimum to provide free access to RealArcade to its Optimum Online subscribers. It also launched a Japanese version shortly before Ted Woolsey departed. That year, its strategy and puzzle games were attracting a substantial number of female visitors. New broadband deals in France, Belgium and the Netherlands were announced on October 17, 2005. The mobile version launched in the same month on the O2 carrier in the United Kingdom, using the I-mode mobile internet service. An American launch on Cingular followed suit. A new version, in association with Playphone, was released the following year.

In 2006, RealArcade had about 700,000 game demos downloaded per day. A new developer service launched in May that year. On July 26, it signed deals with three German ISPs and websites: T-Online (Deutsche Telekom), Freenet and RTL. At the time, Germany had the largest PC game market in the world. It published a mobile game based on the South Park Imaginationland trilogy in July 2008. That same month, it signed an agreement with Topics Entertainment to distribute some of RealArcade's published titles in the North American retail market. Its mobile games were the highest-scored in the second quarter of 2008 by the quality index of mobile game news website Pocket Gamer, ahead of Gameloft.

RealNetworks announced in 2008 that it would spin off its casual games unit. In December 2008, it started developing six games for iOS platforms, among the first of which was Tiki Towers. The game was also the first title to be ported to WiiWare on December 22. On November 3, 2009, it was announced that RealArcade would merge with GameHouse, forming a single game portal. The corporate rationale suggested that RealArcade was running on "substantially older technology" than GameHouse's website. The mobile service withdrew the name RealArcade in March 2010. The last game published under the brand for mobile services was a licensed game based on the 2010 Winter Olympic Games.

== Software ==
Consumers downloaded a free RealArcade program, which worked similarly to RealPlayer and acted as a portal to download the games. Game files were sped up thanks to a data compression service, which RealNetworks acquired in January 2000 (NetZip). Users of anti-virus programs would have to frequently update the software in order to limit computer slowdowns. A custom version of LithTech was used, which was used in its first game published on the service, Tex Atomic's Big Bot Battles.

The main section was the Game Guide, which featured recommendations and new releases. The Web Games section provided free online games. The Game Channels section provided commercial titles by company. The program had a "Scan for Games" function which automatically recognized all of the games installed on the user's PC. RealArcade also featured forums, which were often related to the games available.

== Sales model ==
RealArcade distributed games on a time-limited demo basis. Each game downloaded had a trial time of 60 minutes unless differently specified by each publisher. Once the trial time expired, users were required either to uninstall the game from their computer or to purchase the full version of the game. Users could also subscribe to a RealNetworks service called GamePass, introduced in 2002. For a monthly fee, it offered free ownership of a single game of their choice per month at no additional fees and $5.00 off each game purchase.

== Winners of its Game of the Year awards ==
=== General ===
- 2004: Zuma

=== Strategy ===
- 2007: Build-a-lot
