= Shockwave (game portal) =

Video Game Distributor and Game Portal

- Type: Private
- Industry: Video games
- Founded: August 2, 1999; 27 years ago
- Headquarters: Los Angeles, California, U.S.
- Number of employees: 25–100
- Website: www.shockwave.com

Shockwave.com, or Shockwave, is an online and offline video games distributor and game portal. It is owned by Shockwave LLC, based in Los Angeles, California, United States. It was launched by Macromedia on August 2, 1999, to promote the company's Shockwave and Flash players, both used on the website. As of 2005, the website had 22 million users. By 2010, it hosted more than 400 games in a variety of genres.

The corporate owner, also known as Shockwave.com, was based in San Francisco. Following the dot-com bubble, the company merged with Atom Corporation in 2001 to form AtomShockwave Corporation. It was renamed Atom Entertainment in 2006, and was purchased by MTV Networks for $200 million. Defy Media purchased the website in 2014, sold it to Addicting Games in 2018 which was itself sold to Enthusiast Gaming in 2021. Shockwave was resold in 2024.

== History ==
=== Early history ===
In February 1998, Macromedia launched the website ShockRave, featuring various interactive games and cartoons. The website's purpose was to showcase projects that developers had created using Macromedia's animation software.

Shockwave.com was announced on May 24, 1999, as an expansion and replacement of ShockRave. Shockwave.com was formed to promote Macromedia's Shockwave and Flash players, both of which the new website would require. At the time, 100 million people around the world had Shockwave and Flash installed on their computers. Shockwave.com was formed as a separate but wholly owned business within Macromedia, with its own finances. Its CEO was Stephen Fields, a former executive for Disney Interactive Studios.

Shockwave.com was launched on August 2, 1999. The website included cartoons, games such as Centipede and Missile Command, an MP3 directory, and a program for creating animated greeting cards. The company, also known as Shockwave.com, was based in San Francisco and had 50 employees.

Critics were skeptical that an entertainment-based website such as Shockwave could succeed, in part because of bandwidth limitations. However, Shockwave gained several notable investors in its first six months, including James H. Clark, Michael Moritz, and Robert A. Daly. The majority of the website's revenue would come from advertising. DoubleClick provided advertising services for Shockwave during the first six months. As the website gained popularity, Shockwave began handling advertising itself.

In October 1999, Macromedia announced that it had plans to spin off Shockwave as its own independent company. Macromedia chief executive Rob Burgess said about Shockwave, "It's an entertainment company and we are a software company. You need to run those two things as separate operations". One possibility was to have a public offering of the company in early 2000. Burgess served as Shockwave's interim chief executive while simultaneously running Macromedia. Lawrence Levy, a former chief financial officer for Pixar, became Shockwave's chief executive of entertainment in mid-2000. Shortly thereafter, the company laid off 20 of its 170 employees at offices in Los Angeles and San Francisco.

During its first year, Shockwave assembled a creative team consisting of film directors – James L. Brooks, David Lynch, and Tim Burton – as well as comedian Ben Stein, comic book writer Stan Lee, and South Park creators Trey Parker and Matt Stone. The team received equity stakes in the company, in exchange for providing creative content to the site. Shockwave focused on original, interactive content rather than live-action television. The site included crude-humored material, such as Joe Cartoon, and DumbLand. Fields hoped to eventually turn Shockwave.com into a specialty cable channel. Stein believed that Shockwave would become "the CBS of this era". Burgess hoped for it to become "the United Artists of the Web". It opened a Japanese subsidiary in September 2000, with the American parent as its majority shareholder, with two local shareholders, Transcosmos and Fuji Bank. Shockwave Japan was the first international version to launch, as a localized version of the parent website.

=== Corporate changes ===
Shockwave.com lost $30 million during the last nine months of 2000, a result of the dot-com bubble. To survive, the company announced in December 2000 that it would purchase Atom Corporation and merge with it. Shockwave would also acquire the short-film website Atom Films. The purchase was finalized on January 15, 2001, and AtomShockwave Corporation was formed shortly thereafter. Macromedia owned 30 percent of the new company. Later in 2001, AtomShockwave cut much of its workforce, part of a restructuring amid poor economic conditions. The company also shut down its European headquarters.

In November 2005, AtomShockwave acquired the online game website Addicting Games, and also launched a new video website known as Addicting Clips. At the time, AtomShockwave had 85 employees. The company was renamed as Atom Entertainment Inc. on January 11, 2006. MTV Networks, a division of Viacom, announced in August 2006 that it would purchase Atom Entertainment for $200 million. A subsidiary, Shockwave Japan, closed on January 31, 2009. In June 2014, Defy Media purchased Addicting Games and Shockwave from Viacom. Addicting Games, Inc subsequently took over ownership. In September 2021 Enthusiast Gaming purchased Addicting Games. In April 2024 Shockwave was sold.

== Features ==
At the time of its launch, the website offered two user control tools: the free Shockwave Remote, and the $19.95 Shockmachine. The latter option gave consumers additional options, such as being able to download and save an unlimited amount of content from the website. Some games and cartoons could only be accessed with a purchase of Shockmachine.

In March 2000, Shockwave launched a new website design, compatible with slower Internet connections. It also partnered with MTVi Group, which consisted of MTV.com, VH1.com, and Sonicnet.com. MTVi would provide Internet radio services and content to Shockwave. The updated website introduced music videos, known as Shockwave Singles, which were designed to be played on the Internet. In addition, it introduced the Shockwave MixMakers feature, allowing users to remix songs.

The website received another redesign in 2006, along with the creation of an online game development studio known as Shockwave.com Game Studios. A year later, Shockwave introduced member profiles.

=== Games ===
Shockwave.com offers internally developed games, as well as those created by third parties. In May 2001, Shockwave began offering select games for purchase, allowing users to download them for offline play. The move came a week before the launch of RealArcade, a competing service. Three months later, the website was relaunched with new games.

GameBlast, a subscription game service, was launched in late 2002. Shockwave had previously allowed users to play demo versions of games for free, while GameBlast allowed users to play the full versions for a monthly fee. In 2003, the website began offering prepaid cards for Gameblast, through a partnership with AT&T.

In 2005, the website introduced new games which incorporated advertising into their design. At the time, Shockwave had more than 200 games. Viacom launched a mobile version of the website in September 2006. A month later, the mobile site began offering 30 subscription-based cellphone games, known as Shockwave Minis. The collection included games based on Viacom properties such as SpongeBob SquarePants and Pimp My Ride. Shockwave Minis utilized Adobe Flash Lite, and were only available on Verizon Wireless phones. New games would be introduced monthly.

In 2009, Shockwave launched a premium service called Club Shockwave. The service allows members to play a number of exclusive games, download titles, and enter for a chance to win cash prizes. As of 2010, Shockwave hosted more than 400 games in a range of genres including puzzle, action, strategy, racing, sport, jigsaw, adventure, multiplayer games, and downloadable games. Some games were only available as downloads, while others were web-based only. In 2010, the website introduced Shockwave Cash, a virtual currency that could be used to buy virtual goods in several games. Shockwave Cash was discontinued in 2012, but users were still allowed to use any earned or purchased currency.

== Audiences and reception ==
Shockwave initially targeted a demographic of 18- to 35-year-olds. In April 2000, Shockwave had 15 million registered users, with an average of 80,000 new members signing up each day. As of 2002, AtomShockwave's primary demographic consisted of women over the age of 30. By the end of 2005, Shockwave had 22 million users.

Peter Sucio, writing for PCMag, reviewed Shockwave.com in 2005. He criticized the limited number of free games, but wrote "the games that are free are simply fantastic, because they're produced using the newest version of the Shockwave player. In-game interfaces and graphics really make these titles stand out, and the animation is exceptional". Later that year, the website won an OnDemandie award at the Digital Hollywood conference for best on-demand games service.

In August 2007, Shockwave had 4.8 million unique visitors, according to ComScore Media Metrix. The website's target market was parents and moms, with its customers mostly women from age 18 to 49 years old.

As of September 2010, it ranked # 2,245 on Alexa and # 1,023 in U.S web traffic.
