= Jay Is Games =

Game review website

- Website type: Entertainment website
- Owner: Jay Bibby
- Creators: Jay Bibby and others
- Revenue: Not Disclosed
- Website: jayisgames.com
- Commercial: Yes
- Registration: Optional (Typekey)
- Launched: April 19, 2003
- Current status: Active

Jay Is Games (stylized as JAYISGAMES or JAY IS GAMES) is a game review website that features daily updates and links to casual games, indie games, browser games and flash games of wide interest to casual gamers. It was founded on April 19, 2003 by Jay Bibby, initially as a personal blog, although it later had several contributors.

Several video game genres are covered; including escape the room, puzzle and platform game. The site is constructed as a blog, and attracted a large community of commenters. Jay and the site's staff writers read over and filtered the weblog comments, often commenting themselves. Comment threads often included hints and walkthroughs.

== History ==
Started on April 19, 2003, Jay Is Games followed a personal blog-like style of writing about all genres of games as well as video game related topics, such as the Electronic Entertainment Expo (E3) and what games would be covered. Jay published a new post usually every two days. It stayed in this format for about two years.

It was in 2004 Jay began covering flash games, slowly shifting away from video game industry news and using his site as a personal blog. He also began only giving flash/browser games ratings according to objectionable content. It was in 2006 that authorship of the blog changed - instead of all flash game reviews being done just by Jay, other contributors began publishing reviews.

Due to lack of funds Jay Is Games ceased operations in April 2016. The website remained, and users were still able to comment on reviews and games. The site returned to activity in June 2016, launching a Patreon campaign to fund the site so it can continue to operate.

In August 2023, Jay is Games announced that it was transitioning its content largely to a mailing list called JiG.

== Competitions ==
Jay Is Games became known for its game design competitions. As of September 2012, Jay Is Games had conducted ten competitions. Although the first competition was focused on producing simple puzzle games, recent competitions had themes such as "upgrade" or "replay" that entrants could interpret into their games. This openness garnered much creativity from developers and enthusiastic responses from visitors to the site.

Cash prizes were given, and sometimes relevant gifts, such as an Adobe Flash download. The main prizes were chosen by the site reviewers, however a unique Audience Award was also given. This prize was guaranteed "at least $200." Visitors donated at least one dollar in order to vote (to prevent multiple votes), which went to whichever developer the voter chose.

== Reception ==
The website was praised by the staff of Wired magazine for the contributors' ability to find games; "The signal-to-noise ratio on most gaming portals makes for a frustrating lunch break. This group blog finds the cream of the crop for casual players." Slate's Justin Peters called the site "the Internet's undisputed leader in casual gaming information".
