= Casual game =

Video game genre

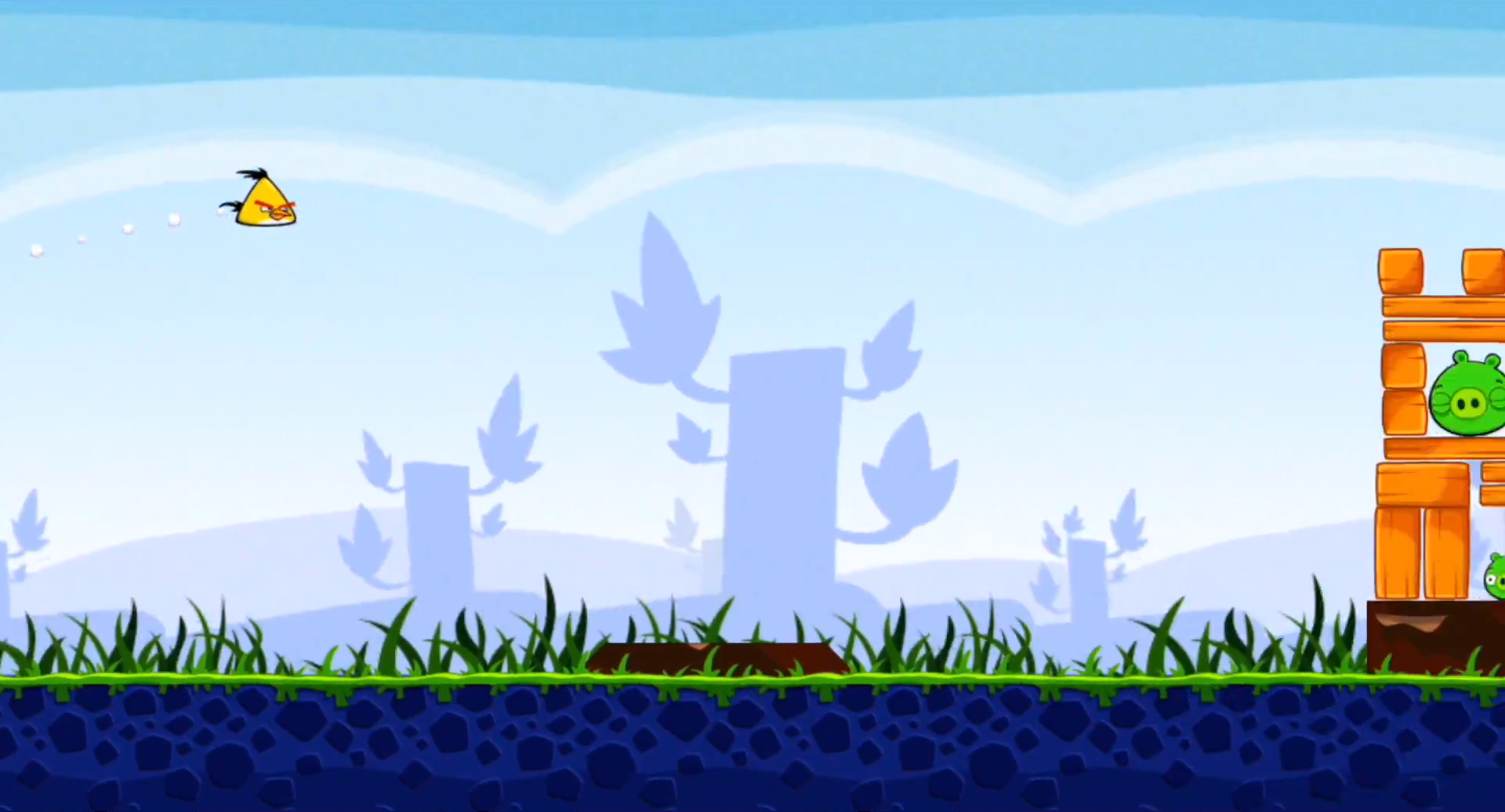
Screenshot of the 2009 game Angry Birds

A casual game is a video game targeted at a mass market audience, as opposed to a hardcore game, which is targeted at hobbyist gamers. Casual games may exhibit any type of gameplay and genre. They generally involve simpler rules, shorter sessions, and require less learned skill. They do not expect familiarity with a standard set of mechanics, controls, and tropes.

Countless casual games have been developed and published, alongside hardcore games, across the history of video games. A concerted effort to capitalize on casual games grew in the 1990s and 2000s, as many developers and publishers branded themselves as casual game companies, publishing games especially for PCs, web browsers, and smartphones.

== Overview ==
Most casual games have:

- Fun, simple gameplay that is easy to understand
- Simple user interface, operated with a mobile phone tap-and-swipe interface or a one-button mouse interface
- Short sessions, so a game can be played during work breaks, while on public transportation, or while waiting in a queue anywhere
- Often, familiar visual elements, like playing cards or a Match 3 grid of objects

Casual games generally cost less than hardcore games, as part of their strategy to acquire as many players as possible. Any game monetization method can be used, from retail distribution to free-to-play to ad-supported.

The term "hyper-casual game" or "instant game" arose in 2017 to describe extremely easy-to-learn games that require no download, being played in an existing app like a web browser or messaging app, and that usually monetize by showing advertisements to the player.

== History ==
Journalist Chris Kohler wrote in 2010 that Namco's arcade game Pac-Man (1980), which debuted during the golden age of video arcade games, may be the first casual video game, due to its "cute cast of characters and a design sensibility that appealed to wider audiences than the shoot-em-up Space Invaders". It is estimated to have been played more than ten billion times during the 20th century, making it the highest-grossing video game of all time.

In 1989, Nintendo's Game Boy was released with Tetris as a free pack-in game. It was quickly learned and immensely popular, and is credited with making Nintendo's fledgling portable gaming system a success.

Microsoft's Solitaire (1990), which came free with Microsoft Windows, is widely considered the first hit "casual game" on a computer, with more than 400 million people having played the game as of 2007. Subsequent versions of Windows included casual games Minesweeper, FreeCell, and Spider Solitaire. The company published four Microsoft Entertainment Packs for casual gaming on office computers from 1990 to 1992.

Casual games started to flourish online in the 1990s along with the rise of the World Wide Web, with card games and board games available from paid services like AOL and Prodigy, and then from web portals, like Yahoo! Games and Microsoft's Gaming Zone. In the mid-2000s, more sites specialized in game hosting and publishing, such as Gamesville and RealNetworks. Some publishers and developers branded themselves specifically as casual game companies, like Big Fish Games, PopCap Games, and MumboJumbo. The advent of Shockwave and Flash created a boom in web-based games, encouraging designers to create simple games that could be hosted on many different websites and which could be played to completion in one short sitting. One of the most prominent casual games, Bejeweled, started out as a Flash game that could be downloaded for a fee, or purchased at retail. As late as 2009, there was still a market for US$20 casual games purchased at retail or as a download.

In 2008 and 2009, casual social network games rapidly attained mainstream popularity following the release of Mafia Wars for Facebook, and Happy Farm in China. Happy Farm inspired many clones, including the most popular social network game, FarmVille (2009), which peaked at 83.76 million monthly active users in March 2010. These games innovated in viral marketing by rewarding players for sending invites to friends and posting game updates on their Facebook Wall.

Casual games became popular on mobile phones, devices that turned ubiquitous among a wide variety of people during the 2000s, and these phones often had preloaded clones of classic puzzle video games like Tetris, Qix, or tabletop-based games. The phones gave all-day availability to the phone owner and helped popularize casual games for many. Newer smartphones, with large color displays and intuitive tapping-and-dragging user interfaces, gave way to a rising industry during the 2010s with high accessibility through downloadable app marketplaces.

Video game consoles' primary audience is hardcore gamers, but there are some casual games on every game console, and Nintendo's Wii console's unique motion-sensing controller appealed to a more casual audience that was perhaps intimidated by other consoles' gamepad input devices. Wii Sports (2006), a collection of five simple sports games in which players used the game controller to swing a tennis racket or a baseball bat, was bundled with the Wii console in most territories and sold over 82 million copies as of 2019.

== Genres ==
Casual games can be found in many game genres. 2000s categorizations by Big Fish Games and Gamezebo, a casual game review site named eight popular genres in casual games:

- Puzzle games: Bejeweled series, Collapse! series, Luxor series, Brain Age series
- Hidden object games: Mystery Case Files series, Mortimer Beckett series, Hidden Expedition series
- Adventure games: Dream Chronicles series, Aveyond series, Nancy Drew series
- Arcade & action games: Plants vs. Zombies, Peggle series, Feeding Frenzy series
- Word & trivia games: Bookworm, Bookworm Adventures series, Bonnie's Bookstore
- Card & board games: Slingo Quest, Lottso! Deluxe, Luxor Mahjong
- Simulation games (including life simulation and sports games): Wii series, Nintendogs, Cooking Mama series
- Party games: Mario Party series, Super Monkey Ball series, Wii Play

== Casual Games Association ==
An industry group called the Casual Games Association was founded in 2005 to promote casual games and to provide educational, networking, and market research resources to casual game developers and publishers. It published a print magazine and hosted annual conferences called "Casual Connect" in Seattle, Kyiv, Amsterdam and London with what it said were "upwards of 7,000 professional attendees each year". In 2018, the show was sold to media company Greenlit Content, who then rebranded the show "GameDaily Connect".

== See also ==
- Browser game – a game that is played using a web browser
- Gamer dedication spectrum
- Minigame – a short video game contained within another video game
- Social network game – a casual game with social network integration
