= Hidden object game =

Video game genre

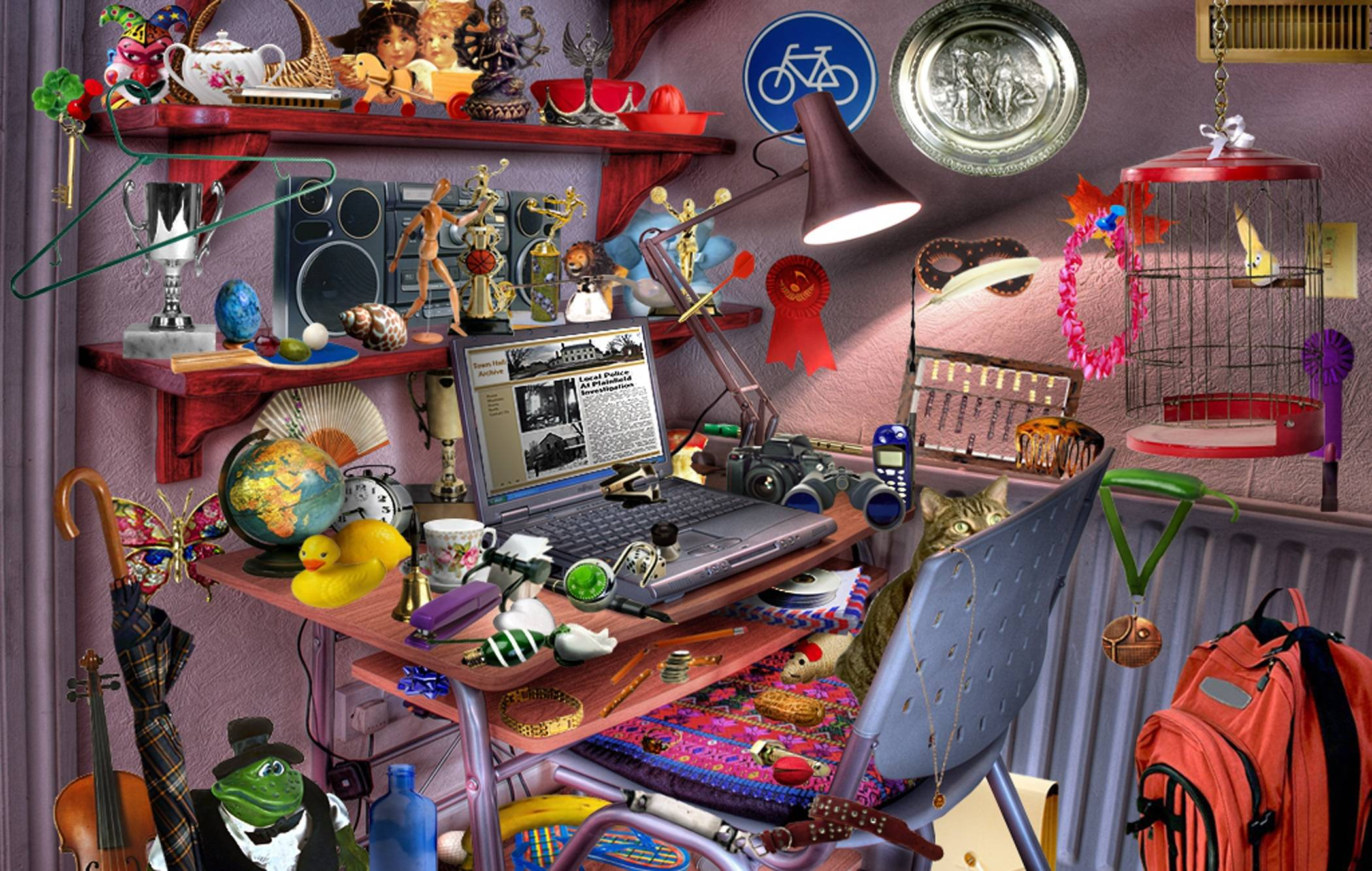
A hidden object game features cluttered objects that a player should find.

A hidden object game, also called hidden picture or hidden object puzzle adventure (HOPA), is a subgenre of puzzle video games in which the player must find items from a list that are hidden within a scene. Hidden object games are a popular trend in casual gaming.

Time-limited trial versions of these games are usually available for download, although many are free to download on app stores. They primarily make money through in-app purchases and ads. Popular themes include detective crime stories, adventure, gothic romance, and mystery.

== Definition ==
In a hidden object game, the player wanders from one place to another to discover objects that allow the player to finish the game. The player adds objects to their inventory. A hidden object puzzle within the game provides more objects or clues that will assist the playing in completing the game.

=== Subtypes ===
Hidden object games (HOGs) are categorized into several subtypes based on gameplay:

- HO/HOG (Hidden Object Game): The classic format where players find objects based on word lists.
- AHOG (Adventure-Hidden Object Game): Combines hidden object scenes with narrative-driven exploration and puzzles.
- iHOG (Interactive Hidden Object Game): Features interactive elements and advanced adventure mechanics, requiring object manipulation and puzzle-solving.
- FrOG (Fragmented Object Game): Players search for object fragments to assemble into a whole.
- HOPA (Hidden Object Puzzle Adventure): Focuses heavily on puzzles and point-and-click adventure gameplay alongside hidden object scenes.

Each subcategory offers a unique mix of object-finding and other gameplay elements.

=== Features ===
Boosters and hints in hidden object games are essential tools that enhance gameplay and help players progress through levels. Here is a list of some common types of boosters and hints:

- Magnifying Glass: Highlights the item, helping players locate specific objects.
- Zoom Booster: Allows better focus on intricate areas within the scene.
- Time Extensions: Adds extra time to complete levels, useful in timed challenges.

Some boosters are accessible as daily rewards or can be obtained through in-game currency.

== History ==
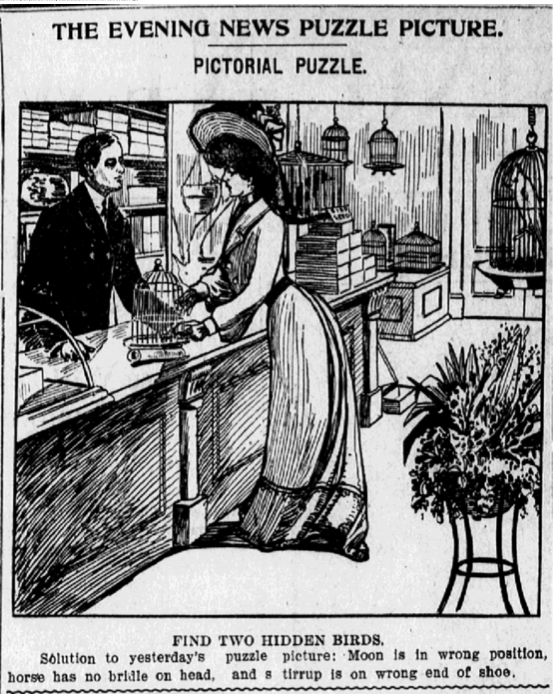
An early example of a hidden picture drawing from 1904

Hidden object games originated in print publications such as the I Spy books or a regular feature in Highlights for Children, in which the reader was given a list of objects to find hidden in a cluttered illustration or photograph. An early hidden object game was Mother Goose: Hidden Pictures, released for the CD-i in 1991. Other early incarnations are the video game adaptations of the I Spy books published by Scholastic Corporation since 1997.

Mystery Case Files: Huntsville, released by Big Fish Games in 2005, came at the rise of casual gaming in the mid-2000s. The game established many of the principles in both gameplay and narrative that would be predominant in hidden object games since then.

More recently within indie games, new takes on the hidden object genre have changed the approach. For example, Hidden Folks is considered more of a searching game, where the players have to find one character among hundreds on the screen that look similar to each other, similar to Where's Wally?.

== Popularity ==
Huntsville broke prior sales of casual games, and the series' third iteration Mystery Case Files: Ravenhearst was the third best-selling game on personal computers during the end-of-year sales period of 2007. This motivated gaming companies to expend in this sort of storytelling that focuses on puzzles with little animation.

Hidden object games draw players who were fans of games like Myst. In 2021, Big Fish Games' player base was 85% female, 76% of whom were over the age of 55.

== See also ==
- Hidden picture book
