= GameHouse =

Video gaming division of RealNetworks

GameHouse Inc.
- Type: Division
- Industry: Video games
- Predecessor: RealArcade
- Founded: 1998; 28 years ago
- Founders: Ben Exworthy; Garr Godfrey
- Headquarters: Seattle, Washington, United States
- Services: Online and offline video game development, publication and distribution
- Parent: RealNetworks
- Website: www.gamehouse.com

GameHouse Inc. is an American casual game developer, publisher, digital video game distributor, and portal, based in Seattle, Washington, United States. It is a division of RealNetworks.

GameHouse distributes casual games for Windows and Mac computers, as well as for mobile devices such as phones and tablets (on both iOS (iTunes) and Android (Google Play and the Amazon Appstore)).

GameHouse offers 2,300+ online and downloadable games, consisting of both in-house produced titles (such as the Delicious series) and third party games. The company attracts a largely female audience.

== History ==
GameHouse was founded by Ben Exworthy and Garr Godfrey in 1998.

The first downloadable game developed by the company was Collapse!, a game similar to SameGame. In 2003, company revenues topped $10 million ($5.5 million net). In January 2004, GameHouse was acquired by RealNetworks for $14.6 million cash and about 3.3 million RNWK shares, then estimated at $21 million. Its staff of 25 became a part of RealNetworks and planned no layoffs.

After the acquisition, the GameHouse studio continued operations as a developer, while its games were distributed via RealNetworks, and the GameHouse game portal continued to operate alongside the RealArcade gaming service.

On November 3, 2009, RealArcade announced it was merging with GameHouse to create a large distribution platform. Such plans include migrating the accounts of users from RealArcade, offering discounts and special offers to GamePass members and new social community opportunities. The merger was completed on November 13. As a result, all customers visiting the RealArcade website are redirected to Gamehouse.com. By 2010, RealArcade Mobile was rebranded as GameHouse.

== Locations ==
GameHouse's main offices are in Eindhoven, the Netherlands. The company also has studios in Barcelona and Alicante (Spain). GameHouse has been working on developing their own original story games such as the Delicious series and Zylom. In collaboration with Blue Giraffe, it launched Delicious: Emily's Christmas Carol in December 2016. The company continues to release multiple story-driven time management games per year on mobile while maintaining Zylom and GameHouse websites on which they publish games by other developers too.

Zylom is part of the Gamehouse Studios Europe, which operates the main GameHouse properties globally.

== RealArcade ==
RealArcade (formerly RealOne Arcade) was a gaming service run by RealNetworks that sold casual-style computer games to individual users, launched in May 2001. Its purpose was to let users download demo versions of games, and optionally buy the full versions.

On March 20, 2002, six new language editions of RealArcade's website launched, in French, Italian, German, Dutch, Spanish and Portuguese. The move was to increase its international user base. At the time, the program had been downloaded 4.5 million times, with a grand total of 15 million game downloads and 450,000 purchases. The company had teamed up with Telstra, StarHub, Tiscali and Rede Brasil Sul to distribute its games either using their portals or using CDs.

RealNetworks announced in 2008 that it would spin off its casual games unit.

=== Sales model ===
RealArcade distributes games on a time-limited demo basis. Each game downloaded has a trial time of 60 minutes unless differently specified by each publisher. Once the trial time expires, users are required either to uninstall the game from their computer or to purchase the full version of the game. Users can also subscribe to a RealNetworks service called GamePass, introduced in 2002. For a monthly fee, it offers a free ownership of a single game of their choice per month at no additional fees and $5.00 off each game purchase.
