= D.I.C.E. Award for Outstanding Achievement for an Independent Game =

Annual award presented by the Academy of Interactive Arts & Sciences

- Country: United States
- Presented by: Academy of Interactive Arts & Sciences
- First award: 2004
- Currently held by: Blue Prince
- Website: www.interactive.org

The D.I.C.E. Award for Outstanding Achievement for an Independent Game is an award presented annually by the Academy of Interactive Arts & Sciences during the D.I.C.E. Awards. This is "awarded to a game that embodies the independent spirit of game creation, representing a higher degree of risk tolerance and advances our media with innovative gameplay and experiences". All active creative/technical, business, and affiliate members of the Academy are qualified to vote for this category.

The award's most recent winner is Blue Prince, developed by Dogubomb and published by Raw Fury.

== Past Variations ==
The Academy introduced the computer genre award of Downloadable Game of the Year for the 7th Annual Interactive Achievement Awards. "Downloadable games are those games in which the user must download a copy to their hard drive of their computer to play. These games sometimes feature a username and password to play, but are not a requirement for entry". 2006 was the first year that did not offer separate console and PC genre categories, so console and PC games were eligible. The nomination packet for the 2007 awards listed a genre category for Casual Game of the Year. The category description matched the description for "Downloadable" and even used past finalists as examples. Finalists were still listed for "Downloadable" instead of "Casual". Casual Game of the Year was officially offered for the 2009 awards. Some of the past finalists for "Downloadable" were listed as examples for "Casual". Casual games were defined as "titles that are designed to appeal to novice or experienced players; are produced with low-cost budget targets; are available through online or retail distribution; and may be played on console, computer, or mobile platforms". Downloadable Game of the Year was reintroduced for the 2012 awards as a "Game of the Year" category; recognizing the "game where the sole form of distribution is through a digital marketplace on PC or console". Both awards for "Downloadable" and "Casual" would not be offered for the 2015 awards. That same year, the Academy introduced the D.I.C.E. Sprite Award which was "awarded to a game having disproportionate resources for development and exposure (as compared to AAA titles), represent a higher degree of risk tolerance and advances our media with innovative gameplay and experiences. Examples include: The Walking Dead, Limbo, and Fez". The D.I.C.E. Sprite Award would be replaced with Outstanding Achievement for an Independent Game for the 2019 awards ceremony.

- Downloadable Game of the Year (2004—2008, 2012—2014)
- Casual Game of the Year (2009—2014)
- D.I.C.E. Sprite Award (2015—2018)
- Outstanding Achievement for an Independent Game (2019—present)

== Winners and nominees ==
Table key
Indicates the winner

=== 2000s ===
Year	Game	Developer(s)	Publisher(s)	Ref.
2003 (7th) (Note: Presented as Computer Downloadable Game of the Year.)	Hamsterball	Raptisoft	Real.com	
2003 (7th)	Poppit! To Go	Pogo.com	Electronic Arts	
2003 (7th)	Word Whomp To Go	Pogo.com	Electronic Arts	
2003 (7th)	Zuma Deluxe	PopCap Games	PopCap Games	
2004 (8th)	The Incredibles: Escape from Nomanisan Island	Backbone Entertainment	Disney Interactive	
2004 (8th)	Diner Dash	Gamelab	PlayFirst	
2004 (8th)	Mahjong Garden To Go	Pogo.com	Electronic Arts	
2004 (8th)	Shroomz - Quest for Puppy	The Planet	GameTrust, Inc.	
2005 (9th) (Note: Presented as Downloadable Game of the Year.)	Wik: The Fable of Souls	Reflexive Entertainment	Reflexive Entertainment	
2005 (9th)	Chuzzle	Raptisoft	PopCap Games	
2005 (9th)	Egg vs. Chicken	Gamelab	PlayFirst	
2005 (9th)	Oasis	Mind Control Software	PlayFirst	
2005 (9th)	Tradewinds Legends	Sandlot Games	Sandlot Games	
2006 (10th)	Bookworm Adventures	PopCap Games	PopCap Games	
2006 (10th)	Diner Dash: Flo on the Go	PlayFirst	PlayFirst	
2006 (10th)	Mystery Case Files: Prime Suspects	Big Fish Studios	Big Fish Games	
2006 (10th)	Plantasia	Gamelab	PlayFirst	
2006 (10th)	Virtual Villagers: A New Home	Last Day of Work	Big Fish Games	
2007 (11th)	Puzzle Quest: Challenge of the Warlords	Infinite Interactive, 1st Playable Productions	D3 Publisher	
2007 (11th)	Azada	Big Fish Studios	Big Fish Games	
2007 (11th)	Build-a-lot	HipSoft	HipSoft	
2007 (11th)	flOw	Thatgamecompany	Sony Computer Entertainment	
2007 (11th)	Peggle	PopCap Games	PopCap Games	
2008 (12th) (Note: Presented as Casual Game of the Year.)	Braid	Number None	Microsoft Game Studios	
2008 (12th)	Mystery Case Files: Return to Ravenhearst	Big Fish Studios	Big Fish Games	
2008 (12th)	Patapon	Japan Studio	Sony Computer Entertainment	
2008 (12th)	Professor Layton and the Curious Village	Level-5	Nintendo	
2008 (12th)	World of Goo	2D Boy	2D Boy, Nintendo	
2009 (13th)	Flower	Thatgamecompany	Sony Computer Entertainment	
2009 (13th)	Drawn: The Painted Tower	Big Fish Studios	Big Fish Games	
2009 (13th)	Flight Control	Firemint	Firemint	
2009 (13th)	Plants vs. Zombies	PopCap Games	PopCap Games	
2009 (13th)	Scribblenauts	5th Cell	Warner Bros. Interactive Entertainment	

=== 2010s ===
Year	Game	Developer(s)	Publisher(s)	Ref.
2010 (14th)	Angry Birds HD	Rovio Entertainment	Chillingo	
2010 (14th)	Bejeweled 3	PopCap Games	PopCap Games	
2010 (14th)	Kinect Sports	Rare	Microsoft Game Studios	
2010 (14th)	Pac-Man Championship Edition DX	Namco Bandai Games	Namco Bandai Games	
2010 (14th)	Plants vs. Zombies (Note: iOS and Xbox Live Arcade versions.)	PopCap Games	PopCap Games	
2011 (15th)	Downloadable Game of the Year			
2011 (15th)	Bastion	Supergiant Games	Warner Bros. Interactive Entertainment	
2011 (15th)	Drawn: Trail of Shadows	Big Fish Studios	Big Fish Games	
2011 (15th)	Insanely Twisted Shadow Planet	Shadow Planet Productions	Microsoft Studios	
2011 (15th)	Ms. Splosion Man	Twisted Pixel Games	Microsoft Studios	
2011 (15th)	Orcs Must Die!	Robot Entertainment	Microsoft Studios	
2011 (15th)	Casual Game of the Year			
2011 (15th)	Fruit Ninja Kinect	Halfbrick Studios	Microsoft Studios	
2011 (15th)	Jetpack Joyride	Halfbrick Studios	Halfbrick Studios	
2011 (15th)	Monsters Ate My Condo	Adult Swim Games	PikPok	
2011 (15th)	Tiny Wings	Andreas Illiger	Andreas Illiger	
2011 (15th)	Where's My Water?	Disney Interactive	Disney Interactive	
2012 (16th)	Downloadable Game of the Year			
2012 (16th)	The Walking Dead	Telltale Games	Telltale Games	
2012 (16th)	Fez	Polytron Corporation	Microsoft Studios	
2012 (16th)	Journey	Thatgamecompany	Sony Computer Entertainment	
2012 (16th)	Mark of the Ninja	Klei Entertainment	Microsoft Studios	
2012 (16th)	The Unfinished Swan	Giant Sparrow, Santa Monica Studio	Sony Computer Entertainment	
2012 (16th)	Casual Game of the Year			
2012 (16th)	Journey	Thatgamecompany	Sony Computer Entertainment	
2012 (16th)	Fairway Solitaire	Big Fish Studios	Big Fish Games	
2012 (16th)	Puzzle Craft	Ars Thanea	Electronic Arts	
2012 (16th)	Rayman Jungle Run	Ubisoft Montpellier, Pastagames	Ubisoft	
2012 (16th)	Sound Shapes	Queasy Games	Sony Computer Entertainment	
2013 (17th)	Downloadable Game of the Year			
2013 (17th)	Brothers: A Tale of Two Sons	Starbreeze Studios	505 Games	
2013 (17th)	Far Cry 3: Blood Dragon	Ubisoft Montreal	Ubisoft	
2013 (17th)	Gone Home	Fullbright	Fullbright	
2013 (17th)	Papers, Please	Lucas Pope	3909	
2013 (17th)	The Stanley Parable	Galactic Cafė	Galactic Cafė	
2013 (17th)	Casual Game of the Year			
2013 (17th)	Plants vs. Zombies 2	PopCap Games	Electronic Arts	
2013 (17th)	Candy Box!	aniwey	aniwey	
2013 (17th)	Peggle 2	PopCap Games	Electronic Arts	
2013 (17th)	Rayman Fiesta Run	Ubisoft Casablanca	Ubisoft	
2013 (17th)	Ridiculous Fishing	Vlambeer	Vlambeer	
2014 (18th) (Note: Presented as the D.I.C.E. Sprite Award)	Transistor	Supergiant Games	Supergiant Games	
2014 (18th)	Hohokum	Honeyslug	Sony Computer Entertainment	
2014 (18th)	Monument Valley	ustwo	ustwo	
2014 (18th)	The Banner Saga	Stoic	Versus Evil	
2014 (18th)	Threes	Sirvo	Sirvo	
2015 (19th)	Rocket League	Psyonix	Psyonix	
2015 (19th)	Galak-Z: The Dimensional	17-Bit	17-Bit	
2015 (19th)	Her Story	Sam Barlow	Sam Barlow	
2015 (19th)	Kerbal Space Program	Squad	Squad	
2015 (19th)	Undertale	Toby Fox	Toby Fox	
2016 (20th)	Inside	Playdead	Playdead	
2016 (20th)	1979 Revolution: Black Friday	iNK Stories	iNK Stories	
2016 (20th)	Firewatch	Campo Santo	Campo Santo	
2016 (20th)	Superhot	Superhot Team	Superhot Team	
2016 (20th)	That Dragon, Cancer	Numinous Games	Numinous Games	
2017 (21st)	Snipperclips	SFB Games	Nintendo	
2017 (21st)	Everything	David O'Reilly	Double Fine Productions	
2017 (21st)	Gorogoa	Jason Roberts, Buried Signal	Annapurna Interactive	
2017 (21st)	Night in the Woods	Infinite Fall, Secret Lab	Finji	
2017 (21st)	Pyre	Supergiant Games	Supergiant Games	
2018 (22nd)	Celeste	Matt Makes Games	Matt Makes Games	
2018 (22nd)	Florence	Mountains	Annapurna Interactive	
2018 (22nd)	Into the Breach	Subset Games	Subset Games	
2018 (22nd)	Minit	Jan Willem Nijman, Kitty Calis, Jukio Kallio, Dominik Johann	Devolver Digital	
2018 (22nd)	Return of the Obra Dinn	Lucas Pope	3909	
2019 (23rd)	Untitled Goose Game	House House	Panic Inc.	
2019 (23rd)	A Short Hike	Adam Robinson-Yu	Adam Robinson-Yu	
2019 (23rd)	Disco Elysium	ZA/UM	ZA/UM	
2019 (23rd)	Sayonara Wild Hearts	Simogo	Annapurna Interactive	
2019 (23rd)	What the Golf?	Triband	The Label, Triband	

=== 2020s ===
Year	Game	Developer(s)	Publisher(s)	Ref.
2020 (24th)	Hades	Supergiant Games	Supergiant Games	
2020 (24th)	Coffee Talk	Toge Productions	Toge Productions, Chorus Worldwide	
2020 (24th)	If Found...	Dreamfeel	Annapurna Interactive	
2020 (24th)	Kentucky Route Zero	Cardboard Computer	Annapurna Interactive	
2020 (24th)	Noita	Nolla Games	Nolla Games	
2021 (25th)	Unpacking	Witch Beam	Humble Bundle	
2021 (25th)	Death's Door	Acid Nerve	Devolver Digital	
2021 (25th)	Inscryption	Daniel Mullins Games	Devolver Digital	
2021 (25th)	Loop Hero	Four Quarters	Devolver Digital	
2021 (25th)	Sable	Shedworks	Raw Fury	
2022 (26th)	Tunic	Isometricorps Games	Finji	
2022 (26th)	Immortality	Half Mermaid Productions	Half Mermaid Productions	
2022 (26th)	Neon White	Angel Matrix	Annapurna Interactive	
2022 (26th)	Teenage Mutant Ninja Turtles: Shredder's Revenge	Tribute Games	Dotemu	
2022 (26th)	Vampire Survivors	poncle	poncle	
2023 (27th)	Cocoon	Geometric Interactive	Annapurna Interactive	
2023 (27th)	Dredge	Black Salt Games	Team17	
2023 (27th)	El Paso, Elsewhere	Strange Scaffold	Strange Scaffold	
2023 (27th)	Thirsty Suitors	Outerloop Games	Annapurna Interactive	
2023 (27th)	Venba	Visai Games	Visai Games	
2024 (28th)	Balatro	LocalThunk	PlayStack	
2024 (28th)	Animal Well	Shared Memory	Bigmode	
2024 (28th)	Grunn	Sokpop Collective	Sokpop Collective	
2024 (28th)	Indika	Odd-Meter	11 Bit Studios	
2024 (28th)	Mouthwashing	Wrong Organ	Critical Reflex	
2025 (29th)	Blue Prince	Dogubomb	Raw Fury	
2025 (29th)	Baby Steps	Gabe Cuzzillo, Maxi Boch, Bennett Foddy	Devolver Digital	
2025 (29th)	Consume Me	Hexecutable LLC	Hexecutable LLC	
2025 (29th)	Despelote	Julián Cordero, Sebastián Valbuena	Panic Inc.	
2025 (29th)	Dispatch	AdHoc Studio	AdHoc Studio	

== Multiple nominations and wins ==
=== Developers and publishers ===
PopCap Games has developed the most nominees. PopCap Games, Supergiant Games, and Thatgamecompany are the only developers that have won more than once. Annapurna Interactive, Microsoft and Sony Interactive Entertainment are tied for publishing the most finalists. Microsoft, Sony, and Supergiant Games are the only companies that have published the winners of this category more than once. Big Fish Games has developed and published the most finalists that have not won.

Developers
Developer	Nominations	Wins
Supergiant Games	4	3
PopCap Games	8	2
Thatgamecompany	4	2
Halfbrick Studios	2	1
Raptisoft	2	1
Big Fish Studios	6	0
Gamelab	3	0
Pogo.com	3	0
Lucas Pope	2	0

Publishers
Publisher	Nominations	Wins
Microsoft Game Studios	8	2
Sony Computer Entertainment	8	2
Supergiant Games	3	2
Annapurna Interactive	8	1
PopCap Games	7	1
Electronic Arts	6	1
Nintendo	3	1
Finji	2	1
Panic Inc.	2	1
Raw Fury	2	1
Warner Bros. Interactive Entertainment	2	1
Big Fish Games	7	0
Devolver Digital	5	0
PlayFirst	5	0
Ubisoft	3	0
3909	2	0
Disney Interactive	2	0

=== Franchises ===
Plants vs. Zombies is the only game that has been nominated for the same category more than once: Casual Game of the Year in 2010 for the PC release, and in 2011 for iOS devices and/or the Xbox 360. Journey is the only game that is a finalist for both Downloadable Game of the Year and Casual Game of the Year within the same year, winning for the latter.

Franchises
Franchise	Nominations	Wins
Plants vs. Zombies	3	1
Journey	2	1
Diner Dash	2	0
Drawn	2	0
Mystery Case Files	2	0
Peggle	2	0
Rayman	2	0
