= Galak-Z: The Dimensional =

2015 video game

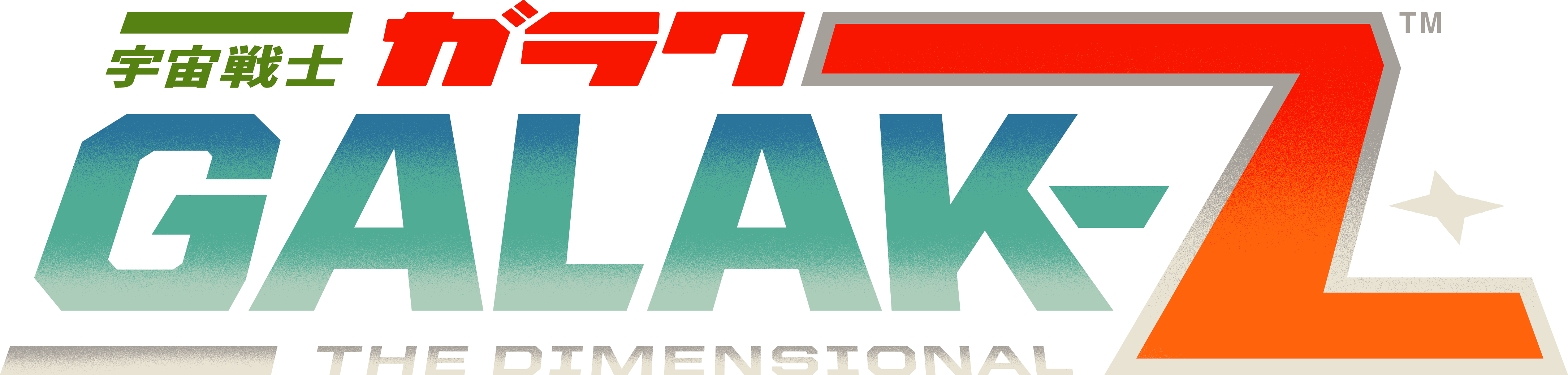
- Developer: 17-Bit
- Publisher: 17-Bit (Note: Nintendo Switch port published by Golem Entertainment)
- Director: Jake Kazdal
- Designer: Jake Kazdal
- Programmer: Zach Aikman
- Artist: Jake Kazdal
- Writers: Jake Kazdal; Mark Macdonald; Kristina Drzaik; Brian Van Buren; Raj Joshi
- Platforms: PlayStation 4 Microsoft Windows macOS; Linux; Nintendo Switch
- Release: PlayStation 4 August 4, 2015; Windows, macOS, Linux; October 29, 2015; Deluxe Edition; March 26, 2019
- Genres: Shooter, roguelike
- Mode: Single-player

Galak-Z: The Dimensional is a shoot 'em up video game developed and published by 17-Bit. It was released in August 2015 for the PlayStation 4 and October 2015 for Microsoft Windows, macOS and Linux. A Nintendo Switch port, subtitled Deluxe Edition, was released in March 2019 by Golem Entertainment. It was announced during Sony's pre-E3 2013 press conference in June 2013. 17-Bit CEO Jake Kazdal describes it as "modern Halo and Far Cry 3 combat in a 2-dimensional shell." Reflecting its inspiration in part by Japanese anime, the game is also known officially by the Japanese title of Uchuu Senshi Galak-Z (宇宙戦士ガラクZ, lit., "Space Soldier Galak-Z").

== Gameplay ==
Animated gameplay

Galak-Z is a two-dimensional sci-fi shooter video game with roguelike elements. The game's levels are generated uniquely for each playthrough and are connected as an endless dungeon. The levels include spawners for enemies and traps.

== Development ==
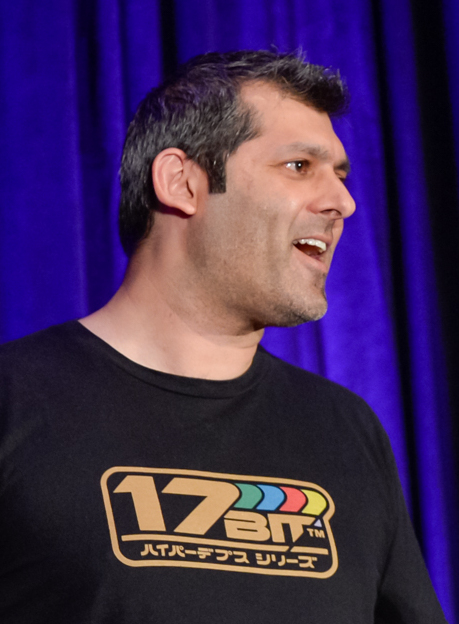
Senior producer Raj Joshi presents on Galak-Z at the 2016 Game Developers Conference.

Former Sega Japan developer Jake Kazdal started the game's development company, 17-Bit, in 2009 to make games similar to that of the 16-bit era. They had previously released Skulls of the Shogun for Xbox 360 and Windows phones in early 2013.

Galak-Z's gameplay was inspired by what senior producer Raj Joshi called "'new wave' roguelikes", especially Spelunky and Don't Starve. The 17-Bit team sought to emulate Don't Starve's "survival mechanics", which encouraged players to plan ahead during their games. The team also liked the game's progression tech trees, which provides the player more options as the game advances. Spelunky's handheld release and its "pick-up-and-play" variable game length inspired 17-Bit to release Galak-Z on the PlayStation Vita. Galak-Z's art style draws from anime influences, including Ichiro Itano's signature Macross series "Itano Circus" missile fusillade.

Galak-Z was announced during Sony's pre-E3 2013 press conference in June 2013. A playable version of Galak-Z was on display at video game merchandiser Fangamer and video game collective Attract Mode's August 2013 PAX Prime combined event in Seattle. The game was planned for release on PlayStation 4 in Q2/Q3 2014, followed by Microsoft Windows and PlayStation Vita versions, successively - this was before the team decided to allow themselves more time for development, pushing the release window into 2015. All versions would contain the same content.

On July 14, 2015, 17-Bit announced that the PlayStation 4 version would be released on August 4, 2015, with the PC version following a couple months later. The PlayStation Vita version was cancelled.

== Release ==
In April 2016, 17-Bit joined forces with IndieBox, a monthly subscription box service, to create an exclusive, custom-designed, physical release of Galak-Z. This limited, individually-numbered collector’s box included a themed USB drive with DRM-free copy of the game, the official soundtrack on cassette tape, an instruction manual and Steam key, along with several other collectible items.

== Reception ==
At Metacritic, which assigns a normalized rating out of 100 to reviews from mainstream critics, the game has received an average score of 83, based on 26 reviews indicating "Generally favorable reviews". IGN awarded it 8.3 out of ten, saying "While not a full-fledged roguelike, Galak-Z's superb controls and charming personality make it great." PC Gamer awarded it a score of 88%, saying "Challenging but immaculately calibrated controls power an exciting and enormously rewarding sci-fi roguelike."

During the 19th Annual D.I.C.E. Awards, the Academy of Interactive Arts & Sciences nominated Galak-Z for the "D.I.C.E. Sprite Award".
