= 11th Annual Interactive Achievement Awards =

Video game award ceremony

- Date: February 8, 2008
- Venue: Red Rock Casino, Resort & Spa
- Country: Las Vegas, Nevada, USA
- Hosted by: Jay Mohr

Highlights
- Most awards: BioShock; Call of Duty 4: Modern Warfare; The Orange Box (Note: Includes awards won from Portal.) (4)
- Most nominations: BioShock (12)
- Overall Game of the Year: Call of Duty 4: Modern Warfare
- Hall of Fame: Michael Morhaime
- Lifetime Achievement: Ken Kutaragi

The 11th Annual Interactive Achievement Awards was the 11th edition of the Interactive Achievement Awards, an annual awards event that honored the best games in the video game industry during 2007. The awards were arranged by the Academy of Interactive Arts & Sciences (AIAS), and were held at the Red Rock Casino, Resort & Spa in Las Vegas, Nevada on February 8, 2008. It was also held as part of the Academy's 2008 D.I.C.E. Summit, and was hosted by stand-up comedian Jay Mohr.

Only one award for "Outstanding Character Performance" was offered instead of separate male and female awards. "Action/Adventure Game of the Year" and "First-Person Action Game of the Year" were replaced with "Action Game of the Year" and "Adventure Game of the Year". "Strategy Game of the Year" and "Simulation Game of the Year" have been merged into one "Strategy/Simulation Game of the Year" category. "Fighting Game of the Year" and "Children's Game of the Year" did not have finalists named in either of these categories.

Call of Duty 4: Modern Warfare was named the winner for "Overall Game of the Year", and was tied with BioShock and The Orange Box for winning the most awards. BioShock received the most nominations. Sony Computer Entertainment published the most nominees and tied with Electronic Arts for having the most nominated games. Electronic Arts has published the most wins, as well as the most award-winning games. Nintendo EAD was the only developer to have more than one award-winning game.

Michael Morhaime, co-founder of Blizzard Entertainment, was inducted into the Academy of Interactive Arts & Sciences Hall of Fame. Ken Kutaragi, founder of Sony Computer Entertainment and the "Father of the PlayStation", received the "Lifetime Achievement Award".

== Winners and nominees ==
Winners are listed first, highlighted in boldface, and indicated with a double dagger (‡).

=== Game of the Year awards ===
**Overall Game of the Year**: **Call of Duty 4: Modern Warfare** — **Infinity Ward**, **Activision**‡; BioShock — 2K Boston, 2K Australia; Rock Band — Harmonix, MTV Games; Super Mario Galaxy — Nintendo EAD; The Orange Box — Valve, Electronic Arts
**Computer Game of the Year**: **The Orange Box** — **Valve**, **Electronic Arts**‡; BioShock — 2K Boston, 2K Australia; Call of Duty 4: Modern Warfare — Infinity Ward, Activision; Crysis — Crytek, Electronic Arts; World of Warcraft: The Burning Crusade — Blizzard Entertainment	**Console Game of the Year**: **Call of Duty 4: Modern Warfare** — **Infinity Ward**, **Activision**‡; BioShock — 2K Boston, 2K Australia; Mass Effect — BioWare, Microsoft Game Studios; Rock Band — Harmonix, MTV Games; Super Mario Galaxy — Nintendo EAD
**Handheld Game of the Year**: **The Legend of Zelda: Phantom Hourglass** — **Nintendo EAD**‡; Drawn to Life — 5th Cell, THQ; Jeanne d'Arc — Level-5, Sony Computer Entertainment; Puzzle Quest: Challenge of the Warlords — Infinite Interactive, 1st Playable Productions, D3 Publisher; Ratchet & Clank: Size Matters — High Impact Games, Sony Computer Entertainment	**Outstanding Innovation in Gaming**: **Rock Band** — **Harmonix**, **MTV Games**‡; Assassin's Creed — Ubisoft Montreal; BioShock — 2K Boston, 2K Australia; Super Mario Galaxy — Nintendo EAD; The Orange Box — Valve, Electronic Arts

=== Craft awards ===
**Outstanding Achievement in Game Design**: **Portal** (Note: Released as part of The Orange Box.) — **Valve**, **Electronic Arts**‡; BioShock — 2K Boston, 2K Australia; Call of Duty 4: Modern Warfare — Infinity Ward, Activision; Rock Band — Harmonix, MTV Games; Super Mario Galaxy — Nintendo EAD
**Outstanding Achievement in Animation**: **Assassin's Creed** — **Ubisoft Montreal**‡; Call of Duty 4: Modern Warfare — Infinity Ward, Activision; Ratchet & Clank Future: Tools of Destruction — Insomniac Games, Sony Computer Entertainment; Team Fortress 2 — Valve, Electronic Arts; Uncharted: Drake's Fortune — Naughty Dog, Sony Computer Entertainment	**Outstanding Achievement in Art Direction**: **BioShock** — **2K Boston**, **2K Australia**‡; Assassin's Creed — Ubisoft Montreal; Call of Duty 4: Modern Warfare — Infinity Ward, Activision; Heavenly Sword — Ninja Theory, Sony Computer Entertainment; Team Fortress 2 — Valve, Electronic Arts
**Outstanding Character Performance**: **Portal** (Note: Ellen McLain as GLaDOS.) — **Valve**, **Electronic Arts**‡; BioShock — 2K Boston, 2K Australia; Heavenly Sword — Ninja Theory, Sony Computer Entertainment; Mass Effect — BioWare, Microsoft Game Studios; Uncharted: Drake's Fortune — Naughty Dog, Sony Computer Entertainment	**Outstanding Achievement in Story Development**: **BioShock** — **2K Boston**, **2K Australia**‡; Drawn to Life — 5th Cell, THQ; Mass Effect — BioWare, Microsoft Game Studios; The Darkness — Starbreeze Studios, 2K Games; Uncharted: Drake's Fortune — Naughty Dog, Sony Computer Entertainment
**Outstanding Achievement in Online Gameplay**: **Call of Duty 4: Modern Warfare** — **Infinity Ward**, **Activision**‡; Forza Motorsport 2 — Turn 10 Studios, Microsoft Game Studios; Halo 3 — Bungie, Microsoft Game Studios; Rock Band — Harmonix, MTV Games; World in Conflict — Massive Entertainment, Vivendi Games	**Outstanding Achievement in Original Music Composition**: **BioShock** — **2K Boston**, **2K Australia**‡; God of War II — SCE Santa Monica Studio; Heavenly Sword — Ninja Theory, Sony Computer Entertainment; Lair — Factor 5, Sony Computer Entertainment; Uncharted: Drake's Fortune — Naughty Dog, Sony Computer Entertainment
**Outstanding Achievement in Soundtrack**: **Rock Band** — **Harmonix**, **MTV Games**‡; BioShock — 2K Boston, 2K Australia; Guitar Hero III: Legends of Rock — Neversoft, Activision; SingStar Pop — SCE London Studio; skate. — EA Black Box	**Outstanding Achievement in Sound Design**: **BioShock** — **2K Boston**, **2K Australia**‡; Call of Duty 4: Modern Warfare — Infinity Ward, Activision; Need for Speed: ProStreet — EA Black Box; skate. — EA Black Box; Tom Clancy's Ghost Recon Advanced Warfighter 2 — Red Storm Entertainment, Ubisoft Paris
**Outstanding Achievement in Gameplay Engineering**: **Portal** — **Valve**, **Electronic Arts**‡; Assassin's Creed — Ubisoft Montreal; Rock Band — Harmonix, MTV Games; Super Mario Galaxy — Nintendo EAD; The Legend of Zelda: Phantom Hourglass — Nintendo EAD	**Outstanding Achievement in Visual Engineering**: **Crysis** — **Crytek**, **Electronic Arts**‡; Assassin's Creed — Ubisoft Montreal; Call of Duty 4: Modern Warfare — Infinity Ward, Activision; Ratchet & Clank Future: Tools of Destruction — Insomniac Games, Sony Computer Entertainment; Uncharted: Drake's Fortune — Naughty Dog, Sony Computer Entertainment

=== Genre awards ===
**Action Game of the Year**: **Call of Duty 4: Modern Warfare** — **Infinity Ward**, **Activision**‡; BioShock — 2K Boston, 2K Australia; Crysis — Crytek, Electronic Arts; Halo 3 — Bungie, Microsoft Game Studios; The Orange Box — Valve, Electronic Arts	**Adventure Game of the Year**: **Super Mario Galaxy** — **Nintendo EAD**‡; Assassin's Creed — Ubisoft Montreal; God of War II — SCE Santa Monica Studio; Ratchet & Clank Future: Tools of Destruction — Insomniac Games, Sony Computer Entertainment; Uncharted: Drake's Fortune — Naughty Dog, Sony Computer Entertainment
**Downloadable Game of the Year**: **Puzzle Quest: Challenge of the Warlords** — **Infinite Interactive**, **1st Playable Productions**, **D3 Publisher**‡; Azada — Big Fish Studios; Build-a-lot — HipSoft; flOw — Thatgamecompany, Sony Computer Entertainment; Peggle — PopCap Games	**Cellular Game of the Year**: **skate.** — **EA Black Box**‡; Diner Dash 2: Restaurant Rescue — PlayFirst; Prey Mobile — MachineWorks Northwest, Skyzone; SimCity Societies — Tilted Mill Entertainment, Electronic Arts
**Family Game of the Year**: **Rock Band** — **Harmonix**, **MTV Games**‡; Guitar Hero III: Legends of Rock — Neversoft, Activision; Rayman Raving Rabbids 2 — Ubisoft Paris; Scene It? Lights, Camera, Action — Screenlife Games, WXP, Microsoft Game Studios; WarioWare: Smooth Moves — Nintendo SPD, Intelligent Systems	**Massively Multiplayer Game of the Year**: **World of Warcraft: The Burning Crusade** — **Blizzard Entertainment**‡; Eve Online: Trinity — CCP Games; Guild Wars: Eye of the North — ArenaNet, NCSOFT; Tabula Rasa — Destination Games, NCSOFT; The Lord of the Rings Online: Shadows of Angmar — Turbine, Midway Games
**Role-Playing Game of the Year**: **Mass Effect** — **BioWare**, **Microsoft Game Studios**‡; Eternal Sonata — Tri-Crescendo, Bandai Namco Games; Jeanne d'Arc — Level-5, Sony Computer Entertainment; Rogue Galaxy — Level-5, Sony Computer Entertainment; The Witcher — CD Projekt Red, Atari	**Racing Game of the Year**: **MotorStorm** — **Evolution Studios**, **Sony Computer Entertainment**‡; Colin McRae: Dirt — Codemasters; Forza Motorsport 2 — Turn 10 Studios, Microsoft Game Studios; Need for Speed: ProStreet — EA Black Box; Project Gotham Racing 4 — Bizarre Creations, Microsoft Game Studios
**Sports Game of the Year**: **skate.** — **EA Black Box**‡; FIFA 08 — EA Canada; MLB 07: The Show — SCE San Diego; NBA 2K8 — Visual Concepts, 2K Games; NHL 08 — EA Canada	**Strategy/Simulation Game of the Year**: **Command & Conquer 3: Tiberium Wars** — **EA Los Angeles**‡; Ace Combat 6: Fires of Liberation — Bandai Namco Games; Company of Heroes: Opposing Fronts — Relic Entertainment, THQ; Supreme Commander — Gas Powered Games, THQ; World in Conflict — Massive Entertainment, Vivendi Games

==== Hall of Fame ====
- Michael Morhaime

==== Lifetime Achievement ====
- Ken Kutaragi

=== Multiple nominations and awards ===
==== Multiple nominations ====
Games that received multiple nominations
Nominations	Game
12	BioShock
10	Call of Duty 4: Modern Warfare
9	The Orange Box (Note: Includes nominations from Portal and Team Fortress 2.)
8	Rock Band
6	Assassin's Creed
6	Super Mario Galaxy
6	Uncharted: Drake's Fortune
4	Mass Effect
4	skate.
3	Crysis
3	Heavenly Sword
3	Portal
3	Ratchet & Clank Future: Tools of Destruction
2	Drawn to Life
2	Forza Motorsport 2
2	God of War II
2	Guitar Hero III: Legends of Rock
2	Halo 3
2	Jeanne d'Arc
2	Need for Speed: ProStreet
2	Puzzle Quest: Challenge of the Warlords
2	The Legend of Zelda: Phantom Hourglass
2	Team Fortress 2
2	World In Conflict
2	World of Warcraft: The Burning Crusade

Nominations by company
Nominations	Games	Company
22	12	Electronic Arts
20	12	Sony Computer Entertainment
14	3	2K Games
12	2	Activision
10	5	Microsoft Game Studios
10	1	Infinity Ward
9	3	Nintendo
9	3	Valve
8	3	Ubisoft
8	1	Harmonix
8	1	MTV Games
6	1	Naughty Dog
4	3	THQ
4	1	BioWare
3	2	Level-5
3	1	Crytek
3	1	Insomniac Games
3	1	Ninja Theory
2	2	Bandai Namco Games
2	2	NCSOFT
2	1	1st Playable Productions
2	1	5th Cell
2	1	Blizzard Entertainment
2	1	Bungie
2	1	D3 Publisher
2	1	Infinite Interactive
2	1	Massive Entertainment
2	1	Neversoft
2	1	Turn 10 Studios
2	1	Vivendi Games

==== Multiple awards ====
Games that received multiple awards
Awards	Game
4	BioShock
4	Call of Duty 4: Modern Warfare
4	The Orange Box
3	Portal
3	Rock Band
2	skate.

Awards by company
Awards	Games	Company
8	5	Electronic Arts
4	3	Valve
4	1	2K Games
4	1	Activision
4	1	Infinity Ward
3	1	Harmonix
3	1	MTV Games
2	2	Nintendo
