= Uncharted 3: Drake's Deception =

2011 video game

- Developer: Naughty Dog
- Publisher: Sony Computer Entertainment
- Directors: Amy Hennig; Justin Richmond
- Designers: Richard Lemarchand; Jacob Minkoff; Emilia Shatz
- Programmers: Pål-Kristian Engstad; Travis McIntosh; Christian Gyrling
- Artists: Erick Pangilinan; Robh Ruppel
- Writer: Amy Hennig
- Composer: Greg Edmonson
- Series: Uncharted
- Platform: PlayStation 3
- Release: NA: November 1, 2011; EU: November 2, 2011; AU: November 3, 2011
- Genres: Action-adventure, third-person shooter
- Modes: Single-player, multiplayer

Uncharted 3: Drake's Deception is a 2011 action-adventure game developed by Naughty Dog and published by Sony Computer Entertainment for the PlayStation 3. It is the third main entry in the Uncharted series. Set two years after Among Thieves (2009), the single-player story follows Nathan Drake and his mentor Victor Sullivan as they search for the legendary lost city of Iram of the Pillars while battling a secret society led by Sullivan's former employer, Katherine Marlowe.

Development for Uncharted 3 began in 2010. Development was approached by incorporating locations distinct from the series' previous entries, with the team deciding on deserts and urban areas, drawing inspiration for the plot from the life of archaeologist T. E. Lawrence. Naughty Dog sought to upgrade the game's openness and realism, increasing the volume of motion capture and voice acting, and conducting field research for better visual environments and sounds. The development team also aimed to improve the multiplayer system, introducing new competitive and co-operative modes, while the game is also notable for being one of the first to carry the new online PlayStation Network Pass feature.

Drake's Deception received acclaim for its voice acting, graphics, story, and cinematic quality, though some criticized its linearity and found it inferior to its predecessor. The game received Game of the Year accolades from numerous publications and award events, and was a commercial success, selling over nine million copies worldwide, making it one of the best-selling PlayStation 3 games. The game was followed by the sequel Uncharted 4: A Thief's End in 2016, and was re-released on PlayStation 4 as part of Uncharted: The Nathan Drake Collection.

== Gameplay ==
Uncharted 3: Drake's Deception is an action-adventure platform video game played from a third-person perspective, with the player in control of Nathan Drake. Drake has a large number of different animation sets, enabling him to react according to his surroundings. Drake is physically adept and can jump, sprint, climb, swim, scale narrow ledges and wall faces to get between points, and perform other acrobatic actions. Drake can now take on opponents in more ways than before: hand-to-hand combat with multiple opponents, contextual melee attacks, and new stealth options. Uncharted 3 also features expanded and diverse traversal moves with deep gunplay. Drake can be equipped with up to two firearms – one single-handed and one two-handed – and four grenades. Drake can pick up weapons, automatically replacing the existing weapon he was using, and additional ammunition from downed enemies.

The player can direct Drake to take cover behind corners or low walls using either aimed or blind fire to kill his enemies. The player can also have Drake fire while moving. If Drake is undetected by his enemies, the player can attempt to use stealth to take them out, such as by sneaking up behind them and killing them with one hit, or by dropping down onto an enemy whilst Drake is hanging from a ledge. The stealth mechanic has been simplified and improved. Some areas of the game will require the player to solve puzzles with the use of Drake's journal, which provides clues towards the puzzles' solutions. When enabled, a hint system provides gameplay clues, such as the direction of the next objective.

=== Multiplayer ===
Similarly to Uncharted 2: Among Thieves, Uncharted 3 includes a separate multiplayer component with network play, featuring competitive and co-operative modes of play. The beta features several customization options, such as different character skins, clown masks, ability boosters, skill medals to attain, and a progressive ranking system. Uncharted 3 will introduce free-for-all modes such as standard deathmatch, character model and weapon modification, and dynamic environmental 'events' within multiplayer maps, similar to the set pieces from the game's campaign – such as a hostile plane flying above shooting all players it catches in its crossfire. Collectible treasures are also said to be available within the multiplayer maps, which can be used as in-game currency for unlocking new characters, customization equipment, and boosters. Unlocked customizations can either allow for changes to be made in character appearances, such as clothing and skin tone or upgrade weapon attributes.

A Buddy System has also been implemented into multiplayer. At the beginning of each match, the player may be joined by a random partner or a friend if joining their game. The buddy's emblem remains displayed as part of the player's HUD to indicate their location relative to the player's own on the map. With your Buddy, you can do a cooperative taunt over dead enemies you defeated together, and can also collect each other's earned treasures for them. The player can spawn next to his buddy so long as the buddy remains alive and out of combat. With the aim of making the multiplayer more flexible and accessible, several logistical improvements have been added, such as the capability to join games in progress or for two different PlayStation Network accounts to play together in split-screen multiplayer on a single console. In the event of ties or near-ties, matches enter an elimination mode as they wind down, in which the players are restricted to one life and must compete to wipe out all of the opposing team's members first within the allotted remaining time.

Several new features have been included in the game, including mechanics that create gameplay situations designed to assist the losing team, improves ability enhancements and augmentations that must be purchased for each use, special abilities that are made available when a certain number of medals has been attained within a match, and "Uncharted TV", a small video window that appears throughout the multiplayer menus, creating a video that can be uploaded to Facebook, YouTube or the XMB. Multiplayer also includes a character creation system, allowing a user to extensively customize their in-game character. Cooperative multiplayer also returns from Uncharted 2.

The multiplayer servers of Uncharted 3: Drake's Deception were terminated on September 3, 2019, along with its predecessor as well.

== Plot ==
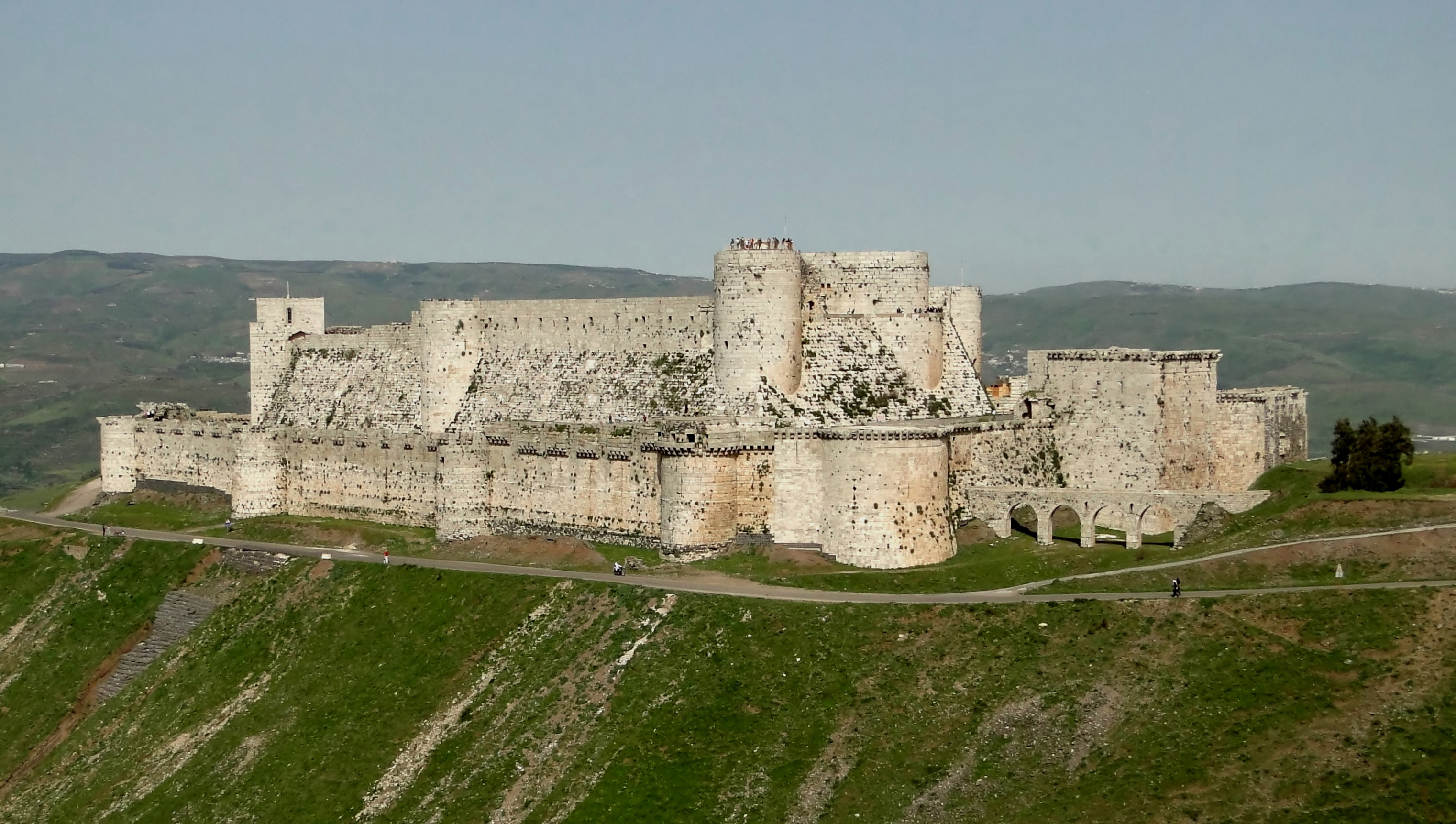
Krak des Chevaliers was the inspiration for the Crusader castle in Syria.

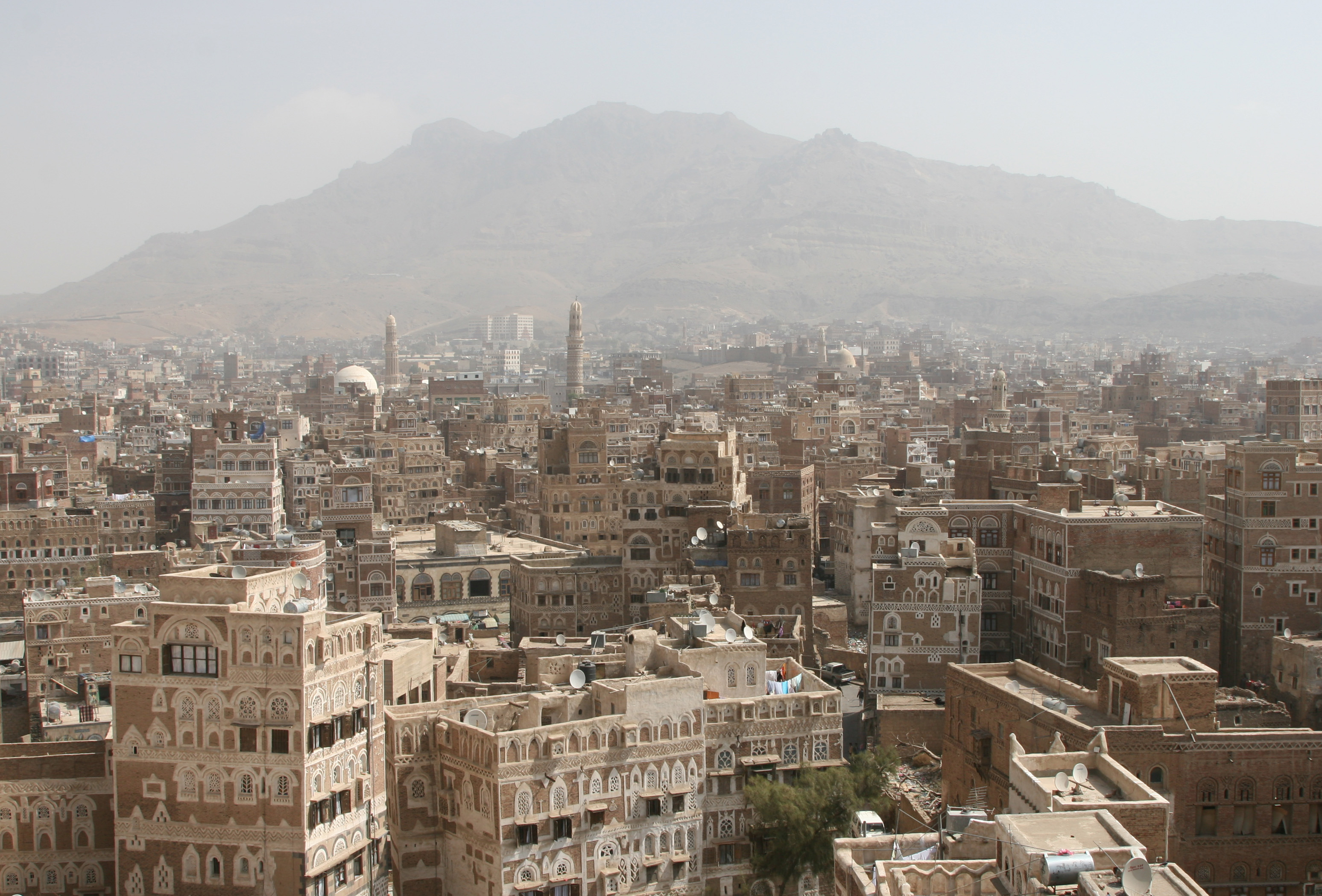
The location in Yemen is based on the city of Sanaa.

Two years after the events of the previous game, treasure hunters Nathan "Nate" Drake (Nolan North) and Victor "Sully" Sullivan (Richard McGonagle) meet with Talbot (Robin Atkin Downes) in London, who is interested in purchasing Nate's ring, inherited from Sir Francis Drake. The duo accuses Talbot of using counterfeit banknotes, and a fight ensues. They are subdued by Talbot's cohort, Charlie Cutter (Graham McTavish), and Talbot's employer, Katherine Marlowe (Rosalind Ayres). Cutter shoots Nate and Sully.

20 years earlier, a teenage Nate (Billy Unger) searches a museum in Cartagena, Colombia for the ring. He sees Sully working with Marlowe to retrieve it. Nate is caught by Marlowe and her henchmen, but Sully rescues him and takes him on as his protégé.

In the present, Nate and Sully are unharmed; Cutter is an ally working with them. With the help of Chloe Frazer (Claudia Black), the group traces Marlowe to an underground library. They retrieve a map of Francis Drake's voyage to Arabia, having been commissioned by Queen Elizabeth I to find the lost city of Ubar. Clues to its location lie in Crusader crypts in a French chateau and a Syrian citadel. Nate and Sully locate the chateau and find one half of an amulet, but are ambushed by Talbot and his henchmen, who take the amulet and set the chateau on fire. Nate and Sully escape.

In Syria, Nate and Sully meet Chloe and Cutter, learning that Marlowe is the head of the same secret society to which Francis Drake belonged. They find the other amulet half, revealing the next clue in Yemen, but are found by Marlowe, Talbot, and their henchmen. As they escape, Cutter breaks his leg, forcing him and Chloe to back out.

In Yemen, Nate and Sully reunite with Elena Fisher (Emily Rose), Nate's estranged wife, who helps them locate a tomb that details the location of Ubar in the Rub' al Khali desert. Nate is shot with a hallucinogenic dart and captured by Marlowe and Talbot. Marlowe has accumulated documents concerning Nate's childhood, revealing he adopted the name of Drake growing up in an orphanage. Talbot learns of Sully's location, and Nate chases after him. Nate is captured by Rameses, a pirate working for Marlowe, who claims to have captured Sully. Nate escapes and searches for Sully on Rameses' ship. He discovers that Rameses lied and inadvertently sinks the ship. Nate escapes, and Rameses drowns.

Nate washes ashore in Yemen. He learns from Elena that Sully was captured by Marlowe and forced to lead them to Ubar. Nate sneaks onto a cargo plane airdropping supplies to Marlowe's convoy but is discovered, and a shootout ensues that destroys the plane. He deploys a parachute and lands in the desert.

After wandering the desert, Nate is rescued by a Bedouin tribe led by their Sheikh Salim (TJ Ramini). Salim explains that Ubar was doomed by King Solomon when he imprisoned Djinn in a vessel and cast it into the city. Salim and Nate attack Marlowe's convoy and rescue Sully. Nate and Sully lose Salim in a sandstorm but find and enter Ubar, where Nate drinks from a fountain. Talbot appears and shoots Sully, killing him. Nate gives chase and experiences hallucinations. He encounters Sully, his death having been an illusion. Sully realizes that Solomon's vessel contained hallucinogenic materials, tainting the water supply. The vessel is what Queen Elizabeth sent Francis Drake to find, but upon learning the truth, he abandoned his mission and lied to her.

Nate and Sully find Marlowe using a winch to recover the vessel from the waters. Nate destroys the winch and a support column, causing the city to collapse. Marlowe and Talbot corner Nate and Sully, but the floor throws Marlowe into a sinkhole. Nate attempts to save her, but Marlowe sinks to her death, taking Drake's ring with her. Talbot attacks Sully and Nate, before he is shot and falls into the sinkhole. Salim rescues them as the city is engulfed by the desert. Nate and Sully return to Yemen. Sully returns Nate's wedding ring, which he has secretly kept safe since Nate and Elena's separation. Elena joins them, and Nate offers her his ring. The two embrace, and the three fly home on Sully's new seaplane.

== Development ==
The game was first revealed by Entertainment Weekly in December 2010. Creative director Amy Hennig explained that the desire for a desert-themed Uncharted stemmed from wanting to push the team creatively and technologically, as "organic" elements such as sand, water, and fire are "technically difficult to credibly render with animation".

Game director Justin Richmond explained that the game feels more open than other Uncharted games: "We're not an open-world game, we're never going to be an open-world game but; we can try. It's still up in the air how much gameplay we're going to let you wander around. But we aim to let you just ride a thousand miles off into the middle of nowhere and still find action and adventure as you go. Ultimately the feeling we want to get is, yeah, your character is lost in the desert. So it needs to feel like that. We aim to make it feel open-world". In regards to whether or not PlayStation Move would be supported in Uncharted 3, Naughty Dog explained that "a great Move game is a game made around Move and we started Uncharted long before that. It would be very difficult for us to adjust it. We tried a couple of things but it wasn't making a lot of sense".

Naughty Dog admitted that Uncharted 2's multiplayer could have been much better if they were given more time to perfect it. For Uncharted 3, Naughty Dog drew inspiration from Ubisoft's Assassin's Creed: Brotherhood and Rockstar's Red Dead Redemption to make their offering the "go-to game for PS3 multiplayer". Naughty Dog also said that one thing they learned through all their multiplayer testing is that damage and health in multiplayer should be "the same or similar to single player". Naughty Dog later revealed that Uncharted 3 wouldn't feature a dedicated server, because Naughty Dog looked for a potential four-year lifespan instead.

Juan Jimenez, software manager for Sony Spain, told Spanish gaming site The Vault that Uncharted 3 made use of the PlayStation Network Pass, making it the second game to carry the feature following Resistance 3. As was the standard, a one-time code was provided with copies of Uncharted 3 for first-time buyers giving them immediate access to online multiplayer features, whereas second-hand purchasers of the title had to pay extra for online play. When asked why the developers implemented the pass system, game director Justin Richmond replied, that without the money from Sony's PSN Pass it wouldn't be able to afford to include as much online content as it has with Uncharted 3, and would possibly have to separate the online and offline content into separate products. According to lead designer, Richard Lemarchand, Naughty Dog had worked on "the biggest and most epic and jaw-dropping game" with Uncharted 3. Uncharted 3 had officially achieved gold status in October 2011, enabling the video game to enter the manufacturing process for its upcoming release the next month. An Uncharted 3 disc contains four behind-the-scenes videos detailing the development and production of the video game, including exclusive material from Naughty Dog. Uncharted 3 came with codes for early access to the Starhawk multiplayer beta.

=== Motion capture ===
Naughty Dog community strategist, Arne Meyer, said that Uncharted 3: Drake's Deception is created like a Hollywood film, especially the motion capture and voice acting procedure. The Uncharted series has received praise for its movie-like sections, which Naughty Dog was keen to take to the next level in Uncharted 3:

We have two motion capture spaces – a smaller one in the studio that lets us pick up smaller pieces, like idles, and then we have a dedicated stage at Sony Studios, and that's where we get both the motion capture and the audio – because we do all of the dialogue at the same time – for both gameplay and cinematics. It's big enough for us to set up and perform everything from rehearsals to the final performances, and that approach, which is basically the same as producing a major motion picture, is what makes the performances so fluid and realistic in our games. When we're in full swing, we're doing new motion capture every week.

— Arne Meyer, in an interview with the PlayStation Blog

=== Graphics and technology ===
"Sand is going to be massive in the same way the snow effects were massive in Uncharted 2. It's hard to explain how it works and how we developed it, but it absolutely ended up real and believable. It was one of our biggest challenges. Sand isn't just there to create footholds; it pours, it shifts, so we wanted to introduce it in a way that looks great but also presents you with big challenges".

— Arne Meyer mentioning sand in Uncharted 3

Naughty Dog said that Uncharted 3: Drake's Deception uses an "evolved" version of the same engine they used in Uncharted: Drake's Fortune and Uncharted 2: Among Thieves that has allowed the game to have better physics, visuals, and environmental effects. The game features new innovations in sand, fire, smoke, and water dynamics and effects; it also adds to the movement of the characters, more realistic textures, and animations. According to Naughty Dog Uncharted 3 is graphically superior to Uncharted 2.

Real physics and environment deformation are key in creating a realistic playing experience, according to Naughty Dog's Community Strategist Arne Meyer. Game director, Justin Richmond, said that Uncharted 3 pushed the PlayStation 3's graphical capabilities to its limits, but Uncharted 3 doesn't manage the same graphical advance seen between the first two games because the PlayStation 3 simply can't handle it: "We pushed it really hard. Uncharted 2 to 3 is still a jump, but it's a narrower jump. And going forward, it depends on what we do".

In an interview at GamesCon 2011, Senior Manager of Marketing Communications Arne Meyer spoke of the unprecedented size of Uncharted 3 stating: "Uncharted 2 barely made it to 25GB, while Naughty Dog is going over 50GB this time, for Uncharted 3. But in the end, we'll be under 50. We'll be one disc". Meyer also spoke of what it is like to work with the PlayStation platform: "I think it really helps. It's not even about sales. It's about what we can push on the platform and how far we can take it. I'm sure you'll hear this from every other Sony developer but you know, I can't tell you how much we've been able to optimize Cell and you know, the amount of content we can put on Blu-ray".

Two months before the game release, Naughty Dog's co-president, Christophe Balestra, posted a picture via his Twitter account, which showed Uncharted 3 assets taking nearly 24.2 Terabytes consumed while stating: "We'd better finish this game soon ...". It was not clear if this network drive is for general use or for Uncharted 3 game assets and data, but Balestra's comment seemed to allude to the former, indicating that the purpose of the drive is for the game. A larger game typically translates into mo-cap and art assets, high-res textures, music, voice audio, more environments, and more content. Uncharted 3 was the largest game to date. According to Mick Hocking, the director of Sony WorldWide Studios' 3D team, Uncharted 3 "will show a new level in 3D gaming". He went on that "Uncharted 3 in 3D will really convince people of our full-screen HD 3D solution ... Genuinely, Uncharted 3 looks phenomenal in 3D".

== Marketing ==
On August 30, 2011, Sony Computer Entertainment America and Spike TV announced a competition, challenging the Uncharted fans to become "a better adventurer than Nathan Drake!". Fans of 21 years of age or older could enter the contest and win a chance to play Uncharted 3 before public release. On October 31, Spike's GameTrailers TV presented the Uncharted 3: Race to the Ring on Spike TV. The 30-minute special featured five Uncharted fans from the United States engaged in physical and mental challenges, with the winner receiving an Uncharted-themed prize package including a Sony home theater system.

In September 2011, Sony Computer Entertainment Europe announced a competition, challenging Uncharted fans to win the title "Uncharted Treasure Hunter". Fans of 18 years and older could enter the contest and win a chance to join "an action-packed quest treasure hunt through the Arabian Desert inspired by [the game]" and a chance to play Uncharted 3 before public release. The travel was from October 2 through October 6, with 20 competing adventurers from across Canada, Europe, the Middle East, and Australasia. The 20 competing adventurers engaged in physical and mental challenges, with the winner receiving "$10,000 worth of prizes".

From October 18 through October 20, AMC Theatres hosted an Uncharted 3 "Play it First in 3D" event, showcasing Uncharted 3 at participating theaters across the United States. Participating theaters offered "an inside look from the development team at Naughty Dog", a multiplayer tournament, gameplay shown on the big screen in 3D, as well as raffles, prizes, and giveaways. "General Admission" tickets to the event cost $25 and the "Insider Access" $60, which allowed attendees to not only gain entry into the event but also get a copy of Uncharted 3 before its release. All "Insiders" had a copy of the game shipped to their homes on October 25 via FedEx, giving the attendees a full one-week head start over everyone else amidst the general public.

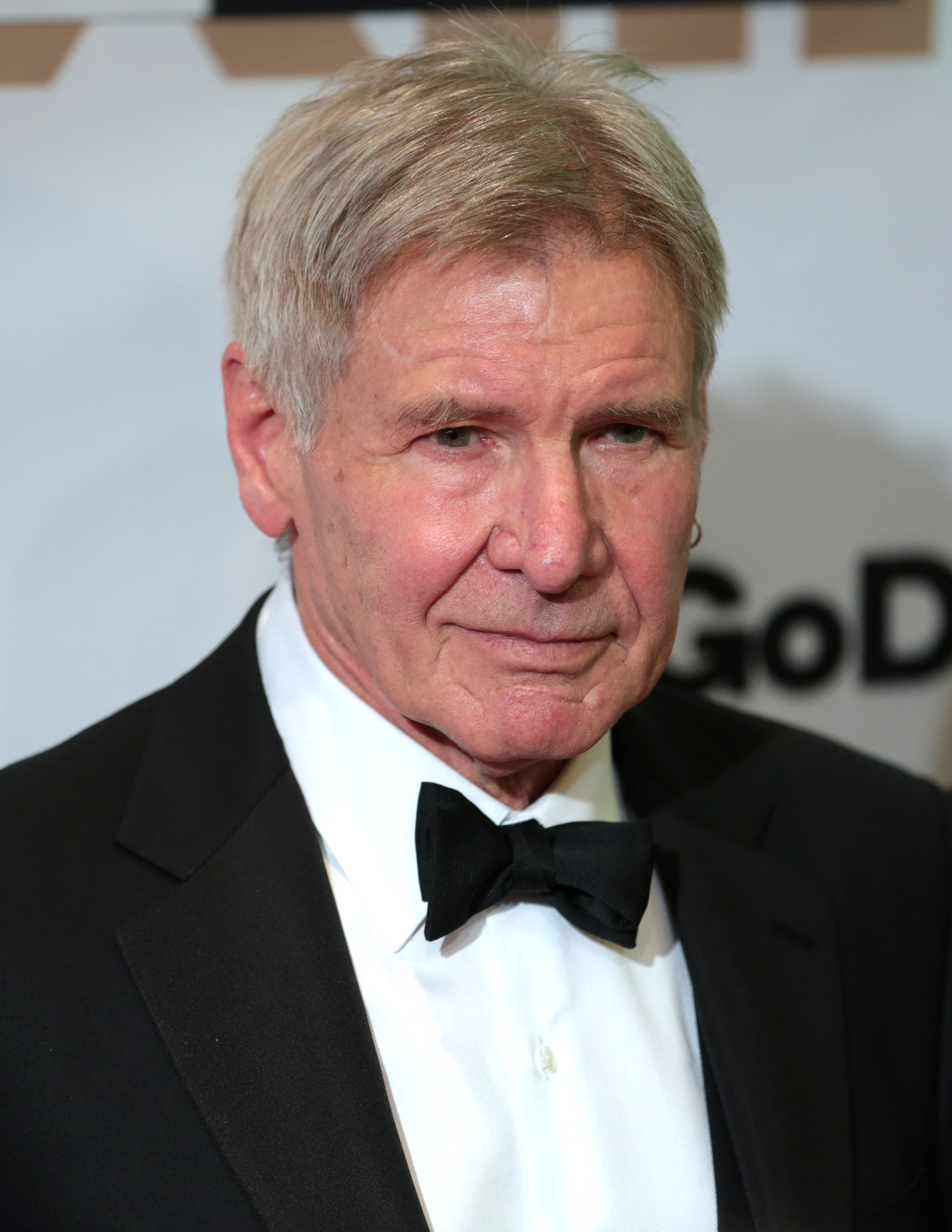
To promote the game in Japan, a commercial starring actor and producer Harrison Ford (pictured in 2017) was released on October 19. It shows him playing the game, as well as his thoughts about the game he inspired.

The first TV spot was released on September 8, during the 2011 NFL Kickoff game between the Green Bay Packers and New Orleans Saints. On October 16, Naughty Dog released the launch TV spot for the game. A Japanese commercial to promote the game was released on October 19, which starred actor and producer Harrison Ford, and what Harrison Ford himself thought about a game he inspired. To promote the game, Sony had several promotional events during October 2011, where the public had a chance to try out the multiplayer and single-player gaming experience, which was accompanied by a Q&A session with Naughty Dog. These events were in several regions, such as the European countries Norway and UK. On October 15, Sony offered gamers "the first ever public sampling" of Uncharted 3's single-player campaign at The Pelican Bar, London. Developers from Naughty Dog also turned up at the event, with a subsequent Q&A session.

Sony Computer Entertainment UK spent £5 million ($7.82m) on its marketing push for Uncharted 3, a figure that the platform holder claimed made the game its biggest software launch ever. The campaign included a short documentary produced by Edward Zwick, as well as TV ads, online videos, homepage takeovers, and outdoor posters.

To celebrate the launch of Uncharted 3, Sony and Media Molecule released a Nathan Drake costume for LittleBigPlanet 2. A selection of Uncharted 3: Drake's Deception themed stickers were also included. The pack was available to download through PlayStation Store from November 1 in North America and November 2 in Europe, which is the same day as Uncharted 3 was released in these territories.

Two Uncharted 3: Drake's Deception Complete Official Guides were released alongside the retail release of the game, both designed by Piggyback. The standard edition is available with a complete game walkthrough, high-resolution maps, in-depth extras, and a full 64 pages in multiplayer mode alone. The Hardbound Collector's Edition features 272 pages with an exclusive 16-page Naughty Dog Cast Gallery, access to the Piggyback in-game multiplayer emblem, and a CD with ten tracks from the official Uncharted 3 music score.

To coincide with the release of Uncharted 3, lead voice performer Nolan North (Nathan Drake) wrote a book detailing the journey during Uncharted 3: Drake's Deception's development. Drake's Journal, a 128-page book, which takes a look at the making of Uncharted 3 from the viewpoint of Nolan North, went on sale in November, shortly after the game was released. The book features over 500 photos from Sony Pictures Sound Stage (where the motion capture for Uncharted 3 was performed) along with plenty of stories of North, which documents the development of the game. Included are also Quick Response codes which link to "50 uncut videos from the mocap stage". If the book had been pre-ordered, the buyer received a 20% discount and entered into the sweepstakes for a signed copy of the Uncharted 3: Explorer Edition.

In March 2012 Sony ran an online marketing campaign, Multiplayer Character Worldwide Auditions, to create a new in-game multiplayer character for the game. Combining open auditions from Europe through Facebook, Sony chose 10 finalists to compete in the finals in Los Angeles on March 28, where the winner got to meet the Naughty Dog Inc., including Nolan North who plays Nathan Drake.

Narrative leader Taylor Kurosaki and stunt movement coordinator Mike Mukatis appeared on an episode of America's Next Top Model: College Edition that aired in September 2012 where the finalists acted in a scene from Uncharted: Drake's Fortune and the winner of the challenge would have their signature winning move featured in Uncharted 3.

=== The Subway Taste for Adventure ===
In North America during October, a month before the game's full retail release, players who purchased certain items from Subway had access to the entire multiplayer mode of Uncharted 3, as part of a cross-promotion between Sony and sandwich chain Subway. The Subway Taste for Adventure promotion ran from September 29 through October 31. Buyers were able to enter a code from a specially marked Uncharted 30 oz drink cup before November 1 to get early access to the Uncharted 3 multiplayer. The offer entitled fans to play all of the competitive multiplayer maps and modes a month before the game was released. Subway items, such as a Subway cap and shirt, could be unlocked by picking up Subway treasures. The player's rank and unlockable items were carried over into the main game.

In Europe, South Africa, the Middle East, Australia, and New Zealand, only PlayStation Plus members had a chance to get to the full multiplayer suite from October 5. There were other ways to get in for non-PlayStation Plus members (according to Sony), however, noting to keep an eye on local PlayStation Blogs and community forums. Although both multiplayer suites included the same content, the European, South African, The Middle East, Australian and New Zealand didn't have the Subway items like the US. Other vouchers that purchasers could get access to by picking up a Subway sandwich or chip was an Uncharted 3 dynamic PlayStation 3 theme, an Uncharted 3 Fortune Hunter Bounty ability pack, an Uncharted 3 Drake multiplayer skin, an Uncharted 3 multiplayer weapon skin or a Subway cup and sandwich virtual costume for PlayStation Home.

=== PlayStation Home ===
PlayStation Home was updated with a new Uncharted 3-themed space and game on October 13. Uncharted 3: Fortune Hunter was a Total Game Integration event that allowed players to unlock exclusive content in Drake's Deception directly from PlayStation Home. Fortune Hunter was a partial recreation of the Yemen level from the Uncharted 3: Drake's Deception multiplayer mode, and a cover-based shooting system complete with weapons and gameplay inspired by the Uncharted series.

Players were pitted against waves of enemies (developed from character models from Drake's Deception), and were able to unlock special PlayStation Home rewards once challenges were complete; for example, players could unlock collectible weapons and even the "Kickback Endurance Booster" for multiplayer gaming in Uncharted 3 if the player completed all ten challenges. If the player pre-ordered Uncharted 3 from PlayStation Home, they also received an exclusive Nathan Drake costume with custom shooting animation for their PlayStation Home avatar. The Uncharted 3: Fortune Hunter Total Game Integration was accessed from the Adventure District in PlayStation Home.

=== Multiplayer beta ===
A multiplayer beta for Uncharted 3 began worldwide on June 28, with early access for PlayStation Plus members and all buyers of specially marked copies of Infamous 2. The beta launched for all PSN members on July 5. The multiplayer beta allows for Team Deathmatch, Three-Team Deathmatch, Team Objective, Free For All, Plunder, Hardcore, Co-op Hunter, Co-op Arena, and Co-op Adventure modes. Two maps were accessible first, Chateau and Airstrip, but two more maps were unlocked over the course of the beta, Yemen and Syria. At launch, players were experiencing console freezes, game-breaking glitches, lagging issues and long connecting times. Naughty Dog released the first patch for the multiplayer beta on June 29, titled version 1.01. Some gamers still reported that their PlayStation 3 was still getting locked completely and required a hard reboot. Naughty Dog wrote on Twitter:

We [have] found a problem with matchmaking a couple of hours ago and a fix is on its way. Today will be a better day. Thanks for your support :)

On July 5, Naughty Dog released the second patch, titled version 1.02, which included some significant improvements and tweaks. In the update, aside from inclusions such as Facebook integration and 1080i upscaling, several in-game elements such as medals and power plays were altered for a more balanced online experience. On July 6, Naughty Dog released the third patch 1.03 in Europe and it should have fixed any European connectivity issues. Naughty Dog's co-president, Christophe Balestra wrote on Twitter:

Okay ... I just pushed #uncharted3 beta patch 1.03 in Europe which should eliminate the matchmaking problems.

Naughty Dog released the fourth patch, titled version 1.04 on July 8, which fixed issues related to Facebook, the XP, and cash during the playback of cinema files. Naughty Dog revealed that just one day after the beta went fully public on July 5, it passed the one million unique player mark in the Uncharted 3 multiplayer beta and the player count was still growing. Naughty Dog also advised players to reap the rewards from the beta, such as the Uncharted 3 PSN Beta Tester Avatar and Treasure Hunter's Starter Pack, along with in-game cash for the full release of the Uncharted 3 multiplayer component. Naughty Dog confirmed on July 12, that player progress in the Uncharted 3 multiplayer beta has been reset for some, sending them back to level one. User data that keeps track of level, cash, and unlocks cannot be retrieved by the studio. However, beta players who were looking forward to rewards in the final version of Uncharted 3 based on their multiplayer beta play history got those rewards. Naughty Dog's Christophe Balestra wrote on Twitter that the Uncharted 3 beta had reached 1.5 million unique players. When the beta actual should have been ended, Naughty Dog extended the beta for an additional 24 hours, to give players a little more time to level up the multiplayer stats.

== Release ==
Uncharted 3: Drake's Deception was first officially released in North America on November 1, 2011, then on November 2 in Europe and Japan, and on November 3 in Australia. In the UK, Uncharted 3 was scheduled for release on November 4, but in July 2011 its release was pushed two days forward to November 2, making its release simultaneous with the rest of Europe. On October 22, reports started coming out that a few gamers in Europe and other regions had managed to get their hands on retail copies of Uncharted 3, all thanks to retailers breaking the street release date. Minutes later after confirming that retail copies of Uncharted 3 had been leaked early, more images surfaced on the internet to prove the leak claim. The pictures arrived showing Uncharted 3's title screen. However, the release date was pushed forward to October 28, 2011, in parts of Europe last-minute.

Speaking on the topic of the price of video games, game director, Justin Richmond told VideoGamer.com:

I don't know what the manufacturing costs are, I don't know what the shipping costs are. I have no concept of that. I do know that for the amount of stuff we're putting in here, it is certainly not a bad deal. There are thousands of hours of content in this game. It doesn't seem like a crazy price to me. But again, I have no idea what the proper margins are. If someone is saying 'What am I going to buy this month?' in November, I hope that our game is the one they pick out, because we're offering something that nothing else on the market is. But if they don't, I totally understand. There's a lot of really cool stuff. What I'm hoping is that as time goes on ... These things are still going to be on the shelf, it's not like we're taking it away. Maybe they don't buy it on day one, but maybe they buy it in February? Maybe they buy it in March? We're not going away, and obviously, people want to play things the day they come out if they possibly can, but sometimes they can't.

In North America, there were several pre-order offers through several retail outlets. Pre-orders consisted of multiplayer weapon mods, medal kickbacks, and boosters. Which of the pre-order bonuses the player received depended upon where they pre-ordered the game. The multiplayer weapon mods, medal kickbacks and booster on offer were Regeneration Booster, Carpet Bomb Kickback and Clip Size Mod for Para 9 and G-MAL, Creepy Crawler Kickback, Callout Mod for AK-47, as well as Uncharted 3 PSN Avatar and Static Theme for PlayStation 3. All of these pre-order bonuses were also available and varied between retailers across Europe. In the Nordic countries, players who pre-ordered the game from GameStop received a bonus pack, which consisted of two exclusive posters, a T-shirt with a print that says "Soon-to-be action hero", and six in-game multiplayer codes (which are the pre-order bonuses). Players who pre-ordered the game from several retail outlets, such as Elkjøp and Game, received another bonus pack, which consisted of the six in-game multiplayer codes, as well as the "Soon-to-be action hero" T-shirt.

=== Retail editions ===
Exclusive to Europe, Australia, and New Zealand is the Special Edition, which includes a "Steelbook" journal-styled game box case packaging. The Special Edition also included a PSN voucher that allowed the player to download the Multiplayer skin and weapon 'London Drake and Pirate AK-47', Multiplayer 'Upper Cut Taunt', 'Cash Multiplier' and 'Special Edition Decals Pack'. It also includes Drake's Journal with fully illustrated pages, screenshots, and sketches from the game.

Exclusive to North America is the Collector's Edition. It came with a Nathan Drake Statue from Sideshow Collectibles, a replica of Drake's belt buckle, a replica of Drake's ring/necklace, and a "Steelbook" case packaging with exclusive artwork, all packaged in a "Traveling Chest" style package.

Also exclusive to Europe, Australia, and New Zealand is the Explorer Edition. It includes the Nathan Drake Statue, belt buckle, and ring/necklace from the North American Collector's Edition. Instead of including the "Steelbook" case packaging from the Collector's Edition, the Explorer Edition includes the Special Edition and its DLC, as well as all the pre-order bonuses. The "Traveling Chest" is replaced by the larger "Uncharted Wooden Travel Case", which has space for 19 PlayStation 3 games. A 3D lenticular image is also included.

Exclusive to Japan is the Uncharted 3-themed tan and brown color scheme DualShock 3 controller. The limited edition controller features a two-tone color scheme, with a map design and a smattering of mountains and coastlines sketched across the control pad. With a high level of detail, the controller also sports a compass drawn behind the directional pad, and Nathan Drake's signature ring on the right-hand grip. It was bundled with the game for a collective cost of 9,980 yen ($129) for a limited time.

In the UK and Ireland, to coincide with the game's launch, GameStop exclusively sold the 320GB 'Classic White' PlayStation 3 system in stores across Ireland and the UK, since GameStop obtained the exclusive right to sell the console on September 9, 2011. The console was bundled with two 'Classic White' DualShock 3 controllers and launched on November 1, one day before the launch of Uncharted 3 in Europe. For mainland UK buyers the console was only available online, while buyers in Ireland could pick it up in their local store. The console was also sold in GameStop stores in Europe, Micromania and EB Games Australia and e-commerce sites from November. In North America, to coincide with the game's launch, a limited edition hardware offering featured a 320GB 'Charcoal Black' PlayStation 3 system, a 'Charcoal Black' DualShock 3 controller, a free month of PlayStation Plus, and a copy of Uncharted 3.

A Game of the Year Edition was released on September 19, 2012, in Europe, with no mention of a release outside of Europe. However, the edition was released in North America on September 25, as part of a gaming bundle of the 250GB version of the slimmer PlayStation 3. This edition included all previously released DLC (up to 14 pieces of content in total), which was previously available as part of the "Uncharted 3 Fortune Hunters' Club".

=== Downloadable content ===
Justin Richmond, creative director at Naughty Dog told that the multiplayer for the game is hundreds of hours long, stating that "we're going to continue adding new content after launch with downloadable content (DLC) like treasures, new character parts and so on. While we can't talk about DLC right now, I'd say the content easily amounts to hundreds and hundreds of hours. I mean, you can play competitive, co-op, and multiple modes. I just can't quantify it enough". He later confirmed of not releasing any downloadable content for Uncharted 3: Drake's Deception's single-player mode: "There's a very specific reason. Whenever we sit down and think we should do some single-player DLC, someone pitches something and we realize – that's a five-hour level. We'd rather build out another game than we would do episodic content. We're so small that we can't afford to have a whole team working on DLC".

Sony and Naughty Dog presented the "Uncharted 3 Fortune Hunters' Club" that entitled gamers to the first four multiplayer map packs and the first three multiplayer skin packs installment of downloadable content at a discount (over 45%) that rolled out over the next year, with the first batch of content releasing in November 2011. As each piece of DLC was released for the game, the purchaser received a PSN message with a direct link to the content on the PlayStation Store. As an additional bonus for the purchase, Sony offered a free, exclusive Fortune Hunters' Club PlayStation 3 theme given immediately. The "Uncharted 3 Fortune Hunters' Club" was updated on January 17, 2012, to offer 14 total packs, 7 new packs, saving over 60% as a "Fortune Hunters' Club" member. The "Fortune Hunters' Club" came to a close on April 17, with the release of "Drake's Deception Map Pack", but Naughty Dog noted that despite the ending of the "Fortune Hunters' Club", "this didn't mean the DLC for Uncharted 3 will stop".

The first DLC packs came in 2011:

- Along with the retail release of the game, day-one DLC was available as well. Three classic skin packs featuring a total of 25 character skins from Uncharted: Drake's Fortune and Uncharted 2: Among Thieves was released on PlayStation Network. Members of the "Fortune Hunters' Club" got these three classic skin packs for free.
- On November 15, a Killzone-themed multiplayer skin pack was released for Uncharted 3 as the "Multiplayer Accessory Pack". Members of the "Fortune Hunters' Club" got this pack for free as bonus content on top of the three character skins packs from the Fortune Hunters' Club.
- Along with the Killzone skin pack, another pack came as an Uncharted 3 retro map pack, called the "Flashback Map Pack #1". It teased screenshots of two of the maps that would be in the pack, which appear to show a waterlogged take on Uncharted 2's The Fort map and a thawed-out version of The Ice Cave.

The following DLC packs were released in 2012:

- On January 17, the DLC was released and featured remixed versions of the Cave, Fort, Lost City, and Sanctuary maps from Uncharted 2. Dynamic lighting effects, new particle effects, touched-up textures, and various new weather effects have been added to the stages.
- The "Rogues Skin Pack 1 and 2" enabled to play "as some of the major thugs and minor characters" from Uncharted 3, whereas the "Donut Skin Pack" offered super-sized versions of heroes and villains from Uncharted 3. These packs were released on February 7.
- On February 7, the "Fort Co-Op Adventure" was released, which sees series villains Zoran Lazarević, Eddy Raja, and Harry Flynn team up in a new add-on that further explores the mystery behind the Janus head statue from the original on-disc co-op adventure.
- "Flashback Map Pack 2" was released on February 21, which offered Plaza, Temple, Train Wreck, and Village multiplayer stages from Uncharted 2. Like "Flashback Map Pack #1", dynamic lighting effects, new particle effects, touched-up textures, and various new weather effects have been added to the stages.
- "Co-Op Shade Survival" was released on March 13, which had players cooperating to fight off wave after wave of progressively more demanding opponents.
- "Drake's Deception Map Pack" was released on April 10. "Map Pack" includes 4 brand new maps (Graveyard, Old Quarter, Oasis, London Streets), each with a new dynamic event that occurs as the match progresses. "Drake's Deception Map Pack" is the last DLC as part of the "Uncharted 3 Fortune Hunters' Club".
- On December 18, Naughty Dog released a free, festive-themed multiplayer content update. The update included an in-game T-shirt adorned with the face of Naughty Dog co-president Christophe Balestra dressed as an elf and Nathan Drake with a lavishly wrapped present around his head. Also included is the "Block Mesh Lab" map created by former Naughty Dog lead game designer and current USC professor Richard Lemarchand. These items were available for free until January 8, 2013, after which they had to be earned via tournament play.
- In January 2013, Naughty Dog presented a new block mesh Lab map for the multiplayer component. The map, which is similar in style to the "Block Mesh Lab" map, is a "smaller map with two main bases, close quarters and some prime sniper towers".

== Reception ==
=== Previews ===
Uncharted 3: Drake's Deception was on display for the general video game audience at the 2011 E3, and received four nominations from the Game Critics Awards for "Best of Show", "Best Console Game", "Best Action/Adventure Game", and "Best Online Multiplayer Game". Uncharted 3 was most notably awarded with "Best PS3 Game" by several media outlets, such as 1UP, X-Play, IGN, Digital Trends, GameSpot, GameSpy, Game Informer and Electric Playground. Uncharted 3 was also awarded "Best Action/Adventure Game" by X-Play, Machinima and Game Rant, "Best Action Game" by Shortlist, "Best Third-Person Shooter" and "Best Visuals" by VGChartz, "Best Graphics" by GameTrailers, as well as "Best 3D Graphics", "Best Multiplayer" and "Best Third-Person Shooter". The Official PlayStation Magazine awarded Uncharted 3 with "Best Game of E3", and GameRevolution placed it in its ten "Best of E3 2011" games.

Uncharted 3 was placed at number three on Big Picture Big Sound's "Top 10 Best Games of E3 2011" column, and was included in GamesRadar's and Official PlayStation Magazine's "Most Valuable Game Award". Uncharted 3 was also on display for the general video game audience at the 2011 Gamescom, and received one nomination for "Best Console Game". Numerous gaming websites have called Uncharted 3 one of the most anticipated games of 2011, with 1UP and IGN ranking it number one in their "Top 10 PS3 Games of 2011" column. Metacritic included Uncharted 3 on their "Most Anticipated Games of 2011" column, and stated that "Sony's console has an unusually large lineup of exclusives scheduled for 2011, highlighted by one of the year's biggest titles, Uncharted 3: Drake's Deception." In Japan, gaming magazine Famitsu had it listed as one of the most anticipated games in its periodic reader poll. Many shops around the country had large displays advertising its November 2 launch date.

=== Critical response ===
Reception

Aggregate score
Aggregator	Score
Metacritic	92/100

Review scores
Publication	Score
1Up.com	A*
Computer and Video Games	9.5/10
Destructoid	10/10
Edge	9/10
Electronic Gaming Monthly	9/10
Eurogamer	8/10
Famitsu	35/40
Game Informer	9.5/10
GamePro	5/5
GameRevolution	A
GamesMaster	91%
GameSpot	9/10
GamesRadar+	9/10
GamesTM	10/10
GameTrailers	9.5/10
IGN	10/10
Joystiq	4.5/5
PlayStation Official Magazine – Australia	10/10
PlayStation Official Magazine – UK	10/10
Official U.S. PlayStation Magazine	10/10
Play	90%
PSM3	9.6/10
VideoGamer.com	9/10
X-Play	4/5
A.V. Club	C

Uncharted 3: Drake's Deception received critical acclaim, receiving numerous "Game of the Year" awards. The game has a score of 92 out of 100 on Metacritic, making it one of the most critically acclaimed games of 2011. The first publication to review Uncharted 3 was the Spanish magazine Playmania, which gave it a score of 9.9 out of 10, the highest score that the magazine has ever given a game. The reviewer ignored a request from Naughty Dog co-president Christophe Balestra requesting publishers not to include plot spoilers in their coverage. The second review was published by the Dutch magazine Power Unlimited, which awarded it with 94%, and concluded: "It is jaw-dropping. The whole game has many highlights. One of the best games ever for the PlayStation 3 to date".

The third review was published by the Spanish edition of the Official PlayStation Magazine, which gave it a 9.8 out of 10 score, called it "a masterpiece to remember for many years that will be difficult to overcome". PlayStation Official Magazine – UK awarded the game a perfect score and a gold award. In their review they stated: "For the second time in succession, Naughty Dog has created a game that can claim to not only be the best on PS3, but also one of the best in gaming history ... A visual, technical and narrative tour de force that takes the sky-high expectations of an entire community and blows them out the back of a jumbo jet, replacing them with more show-stopping moments than you could hope to find in a dozen other games combined". The US edition of the PlayStation Official Magazine wrote: "Viewed strictly as a videogame, Uncharted 3: Drake's Deception represents the height of technical achievement—the state-of-the-art, if you will—for the interactive console experience".

Several mainstream press reviews praised the game, particularly for its graphics and cinematic quality. Garrett Martin of Paste said:

Like the previous game's hotel sequence, the cruise ship segment is impressive because of how it exploits our perception of both the game's rules and our character's surroundings. As the boat lurches downward, we have to maneuver Drake upwards through hallways and staterooms that tilt sideways, climbing up through doors and over bed frames. Our horizontal axis turns vertical as a wall of water surges towards us and suicidal pirates continue to attack, forcing us to quickly adapt to this new perspective. Eventually, we fall into a grand chamber whose skylight is fully submerged. The art deco decor, underwater lighting, and skewed angles recall both Bioshock and The Poseidon Adventure. Sadly there are no cameos from Red Buttons or Shelley Winters. Moments like that are what make Uncharted 3 great.

Ars Technica reviewer Ben Kuchera praised the writing and voice acting, saying: "Overall, this is an amazing achievement in design, and it rests comfortably at the top of the heap when it comes to action games. It's also one of the rare video games where the writing and voice acting aren't just good "for a video game", they're good for a television show or a movie. Joy can be found in the small moments and movements of the characters, and their interactions are always fun to watch". In a review for The Telegraph, Tom Hoggins described it as "if you were to break Drake's Deception down to its base elements, it's the same Uncharted we have grown to love, just a little trimmer, more slick". Dan Silver of Daily Mirror concluded the review: "Overall, Drake's Deception is one of the most spectacular entertainment experiences ever produced, but one you'll enjoy holding a joypad rather than a bucket of popcorn. And, ultimately, that doesn't really matter at all". The Sydney Morning Herald reviewer said: "It's another thrilling ride with gorgeous presentation, absolutely exhilarating set pieces, well-integrated puzzles and robust combat that is equally satisfying whether you are wielding a gun or bare-knuckle brawling".

1UP gave the game a perfect score, and stated that "developer Naughty Dog continues to prove they are masters of their craft, and the third chapter of Uncharted is a fun and rewarding adventure that's easily one of the best games this year". IGN's Greg Miller praised the title by awarding it with a perfect score, and saying that "from start to finish, single player to multiplayer, this game sings. The characters, the graphics, the sound, the story – they're all top-notch. If you're willing to skip Uncharted 3, be prepared to miss one of gaming's finest moments", and calling it "an experience, a complete package".

Edge gave it 9 out of 10 and concluded with that "just like Machu Picchu, the Pyramids and every other engineering marvel of antiquity, Uncharted 3 will stand as a reminder to future generations of gamers that enough problem-solving imagination can turn any old trowel into a magic wand". One of the lowest scores was given by Simon Parkin of Eurogamer: "As a slice of one-view entertainment, Uncharted 3 is peerless ... As an expression of all that a video game could be, however, Uncharted 3 is narrow, focused and ultimately shallow". The Technique reviewer Hank Whitson was also less impressed by the game: "Uncharted 2: Among Thieves was not only one of the best games on the PlayStation 3, but one of the best video games to date. It featured a fun sharply-written script, engaging gameplay, a brilliant soundtrack, and the best cinematic pacing ever presented in a videogame. Needless to say, expectations for Uncharted 3: Drake's Deception were extremely high. While Uncharted 3 is a tremendously satisfying game and one of the best releases of 2011, it fails to fully live up to the legacy of its legendary predecessor".

The game received some criticism for its linearity. Amy Hennig, in an interview with GameTrailers, defended this aspect by arguing that too little linearity in the series would have affected the game's narrative. Another minor issue raised by players was for the aiming system in gunplay. In a statement, Naughty Dog counteracted complaints it was inaccurate; this failed to alleviate the growing complaints, and the developer later invited several fans to its company headquarters to discuss the problem. Shortly after the game's release, Naughty Dog released a patch that offered a fix for those unhappy with the game's refined aiming controls. The update offers the option of toggling between the new controls and a set-up more in line with that found in Uncharted 2.

In 2013, Liz Lanier of Game Informer included Marlowe among the top ten female villains in video games, stating that "Marlowe is the definition of a power lady. She runs the Hermetic Order, a secret organization that will do anything to find the Atlantis of the Sands. Marlowe will still take any opportunity to belittle Drake and others that get in her way on a personal level on top of taking violent action".

=== Sales ===
According to NPD Group, Uncharted 3: Drake's Deception was the fifth-best-selling game in the U.S. in November 2011 at 700,000 copies. During the first week of sales in the United Kingdom, Uncharted 3 became the second-best selling game on the all-format chart, beaten only by EA's Battlefield 3. It became the 11th best-ever PS3 launch in the UK and outperformed its predecessor's launch week sales by 37 percent. Uncharted 3 topped the PS3 and Individual Platforms charts, replacing Battlefield 3. During the first week of sales in Japan, Uncharted 3 became the second-best selling game on the chart and sold 124,989 copies, which is 3x more than Uncharted 2 sold in the region in 2009.

Worldwide, the game broke all records for the Uncharted franchise, in the sales department, firmly ahead of the last game in the franchise. Sony confirmed it shipped 3.8 million copies globally on launch day, making it "one of the best-selling titles of 2011, putting the third installment on a clear course to be the biggest selling game in the trilogy". Uncharted 3 also is the fourth fastest selling PlayStation 3 exclusive ever, behind Gran Turismo 5, Metal Gear Solid 4: Guns of the Patriots and God of War III. The Uncharted franchise has sold over 21 million units worldwide, with product marketing manager for Uncharted 3 Asad Quizilbash stating that Uncharted 3's week one sales were double that of Uncharted 2, "far exceeding" expectations. As of 2019, Uncharted 3 has sold over 9 million copies.

=== Awards ===
Following the critical acclaim it received at its release, Uncharted 3: Drake's Deception has received numerous awards from various magazines, trade shows, and gaming websites. Uncharted 3 was nominated for eight awards at the 2011 Spike Video Game Awards, including Game of the Year, and was voted by critics for two wins. In Famitsu readers' top 50 recommended titles for the PlayStation 3, Uncharted 3 was placed third, making it the second highest western game on the list, only beaten by its predecessor, which took the top spot. Uncharted 3: Drake's Deception received twelve nominations at the 15th Annual Interactive Achievement Awards (including "Game of the Year"), one nomination at the Writers Guild of America Awards 2011, and three nominations at the 12th Annual Game Developers Choice Awards. Uncharted 3 also received six nominations at the 8th British Academy Video Games Awards, and a nomination for the UK's only publicly voted award GAME Award of 2011.

Honor	Awards	Presented by	Date
Number 2	The 10 Best PS3 Games	GamePro	Nov 25, 2011
Best PS3 Game	2011 Video Game Awards	Spike Video Game Awards	Dec 10, 2011
Best Graphics	2011 Video Game Awards	Spike Video Game Awards	Dec 10, 2011
Best Game Cinematography	Inside Gaming Awards 2011	Machinima.com	Dec 10, 2011
Game of the Year	2011's best ... Games	RegHardware	Dec 10, 2011
Best Performance by Nolan North	Best of 2011 Awards	X-Play	Dec 14, 2011
Game of the Year	Top 10 Games of 2011	VentureBeat	Dec 16, 2011
Fanboy Award for Best PS3 Exclusive	The Platinum Chalice Awards 2011	GamesRadar	Dec 16, 2011
Cutscenes we actually want to watch	The Platinum Chalice Awards 2011	GamesRadar	Dec 16, 2011
BFF award for Best Sidekick (Victor Sullivan)	The Platinum Chalice Awards 2011	GamesRadar	Dec 16, 2011
Best Visual Design	Best Games of 2011	Edge	Dec 17, 2011
Christmas Number One	Christmas Number One	Play Magazine	Dec 20, 2011
Best PS3 Exclusive	Best of 2011 Awards	GameRevolution	Dec 21, 2011
Best PS3 Exclusive	Best Games of 2011	PlayStation Universe	Dec 22, 2011
Best Action/Adventure Game	Best Games of 2011	PlayStation Universe	Dec 22, 2011
Best Third-Person Shooter	Game of the Year Awards – PS3	VGChartz	Dec 22, 2011
Best Graphics	Game of the Year Awards – PS3	VGChartz	Dec 22, 2011
PS3 Game of the Year (Readers Choice)	Game of the Year Awards – PS3	VGChartz	Dec 22, 2011
Best PS3 Exclusive	The Lazygamer Awards 2011	Lazygamer	Dec 23, 2011
Game of the Year	Staff/Community Game of the Year	MediaKick	Dec 23, 2011
PlayStation 3 Game of the Year	Staff/Community Game of the Year	MediaKick	Dec 23, 2011
Best Action-Adventure	Staff/Community Game of the Year	MediaKick	Dec 23, 2011
Best Visual Appearance	Staff/Community Game of the Year	MediaKick	Dec 23, 2011
Best PS3 Exclusive	The Best Videogames of 2011	Metacritic	Dec 23, 2011
Game of the Year	Game of the Year	PlayStation Official Magazine – UK	Dec 23, 2011
Best PS3 Exclusive	Best of 2011 Awards	PlayStation LifeStyle	Dec 23, 2011
Game of the Year (Reader's Choice)	Best of 2011 Awards	PlayStation LifeStyle	Dec 23, 2011
PS3 Game of the Year	Video Game Of The Year Awards 2011	UGO Networks	Dec 23, 2011
Best PS3 Exclusive	Best of 2011 Awards: Video Games	Digital Trends	Dec 27, 2011
Best PS3 Game (Readers' Choice)	Best of 2011	GameSpot	Dec 30, 2011
Best Third-Person Shooter	Game of the Year Awards 2011	GameTrailers	Dec 30, 2011
Best Graphics	Game of the Year Awards 2011	GameTrailers	Dec 30, 2011
Best Platform Exclusive	Game of the Year Awards 2011	GameTrailers	Dec 30, 2011
Best Single Player Campaign	Game of the Year Awards 2011	GameTrailers	Dec 30, 2011
Best PS3 game	Game of the Year Awards 2011	GameTrailers	Dec 30, 2011
Game of the Year	Game of the Year Awards 2011	GameTrailers	Dec 30, 2011
Best Story	Game of the Year Awards	GameZone	Dec 30, 2011
Best Graphics (Technical)	Game of the Year Awards	GameZone	Dec 30, 2011
Best Voice Acting	Game of the Year Awards	GameZone	Dec 30, 2011
PlayStation 3 Game of the Year	Game of the Year Awards	GameZone	Dec 30, 2011
Number 7 (Best Exclusive Game)	Readers' Top 50 Games of 2011	Eurogamer	Jan 1, 2012
Best Developer (Naughty Dog)	Best of 2011	1UP	Jan 5, 2012
PS3 Game of the Year	Best of 2011	IGN	Jan 17, 2012
Best PS3 Graphics	Best of 2011	IGN	Jan 17, 2012
Best PS3 Sound	Best of 2011	IGN	Jan 17, 2012
Best PS3 Action Game (Reader's Choice)	Best of 2011	IGN	Jan 17, 2012
Best PS3 Graphics (Reader's Choice)	Best of 2011	IGN	Jan 17, 2012
Best PS3 Sound (Reader's Choice)	Best of 2011	IGN	Jan 17, 2012
Best PS3 Story (Reader's Choice)	Best of 2011	IGN	Jan 17, 2012
PS3 Game of the Year (Reader's Choice)	Best of 2011	IGN	Jan 17, 2012
Overall Action Adventure (Reader's Choice)	Best of 2011	IGN	Jan 17, 2012
Best Overall Graphics	Best of 2011	IGN	Jan 17, 2012
Best Overall Graphics (Reader's Choice)	Best of 2011	IGN	Jan 17, 2012
Best Overall Studio (Naughty Dog) (Reader's Choice)	Best of 2011	IGN	Jan 17, 2012
Best Action Game	Best Games of 2011	PlayStation: The Official Magazine	Jan 18, 2012
Most Compelling Character (Nathan Drake)	Best Games of 2011	PlayStation: The Official Magazine	Jan 18, 2012
Outstanding Achievement in Animation	15th Annual Interactive Achievement Awards	Academy of Interactive Arts & Sciences	Feb 9, 2012
Outstanding Achievement in Art Direction	15th Annual Interactive Achievement Awards	Academy of Interactive Arts & Sciences	Feb 9, 2012
Outstanding Achievement in Visual Engineering	15th Annual Interactive Achievement Awards	Academy of Interactive Arts & Sciences	Feb 9, 2012
Best Action Game	3rd Annual Danish Game Awards	Danish Game Awards	Feb 9, 2012
VideoGame Writing	Writers Guild of America Awards 2011	Writers Guild of America Awards	Feb 19, 2012
Best Visual Arts	12th Annual Game Developers Choice Awards	Game Developers Choice Awards	Mar 7, 2012

== Sequel ==
In Official PlayStation Magazine UK's interview about Uncharted 4, Richmond discussed some of the new directions that the franchise could take in the future, as well as maintaining fan interest and going too far. According to Richmond, Nate still had plenty more to give and the studio would continue to create new Uncharted experiences as long as fans wanted it. Richmond pointed out that the studio never set out to make a trilogy. Instead it has always "sort have seen it as a stand-alone adventure", with each game existing as a self-sustaining gaming experience: "We have always said that if we think that we can make something new and interesting, if the fans still want them, then we can make another one". The fourth installment, Uncharted 4: A Thief's End, was released for PlayStation 4 on May 10, 2016, serving as the conclusion of Drake's story.
