= Azada =

Azada can mean:

- a grub hoe, a type of hoe (tool)
- Azada (video game), an adventure-puzzle casual game
