= Drawn: Trail of Shadows =

2011 video game

- Developer: Big Fish Games
- Publisher: Big Fish Games
- Platforms: Windows; iOS
- Release: Win; WW: October 19, 2011; iOS; WW: November 19, 2012
- Genre: Adventure
- Mode: Single-player

Drawn: Trail of Shadows is an adventure game by Big Fish Games. It is the third game in the Drawn series.

== Gameplay ==
A boy with the power to bring his paintings to life paints a picture of a wizard. The wizard attempts to use the boy's power for his own ends. Players control another character who can make paintings come to life. They must solve puzzles to save the boy and stop the wizard. It includes a hint system, and players can skip logic puzzles if they wish.

== Development ==
Big Fish Games released Drawn: Trail of Shadows for Windows on October 19, 2011. It was released on iOS on November 19, 2012.

== Reception ==
Rock Paper Shotgun praised the art and said people should not ignore it because its Big Fish's reputation for casual games. Adventure Gamers and GamePro praised the artwork and puzzles, though they said some puzzles may seem a bit too easy for hardcore gamers. Adventure Gamers subsequently said it was the best casual game of 2011. Gamezebo considered it another high point for Big Fish Games in the adventure-puzzle genre. Although Engadget still recommended it, they said the iOS port suffered some minor issues, such as not playing cutscenes.

At the 15th Annual Interactive Achievement Awards, it was nominated for the D.I.C.E. Award for Outstanding Achievement for an Independent Game.
