= Drawn (series) =

- Cover art for The Painted Tower
- Genres: Adventure, Hidden Objects, Puzzle
- Developers: Big Fish Studios, Friendly Fox Studios
- Publisher: Big Fish Games
- Platforms: Windows, Mac OS X, iOS
- First release: Drawn: The Painted Tower; September 5, 2009
- Latest release: Redrawn: The Painted Tower; November 5, 2021

Drawn is a casual game series developed by Big Fish Studios and distributed by Big Fish Games through their digital distribution portal. The games are adventure games, with Hidden Objects and Puzzles elements.

== Games ==
=== Drawn series ===
==== The Painted Tower ====
Drawn: The Painted Tower is the first installment in the Drawn series and was released on September 5, 2009. It was first released on Windows and OS X and later on December 9, 2010 for iOS. The player must locate and rescue Iris from the Painted Tower. Iris has the magical ability to turn anything she draws into real-life objects, and this feature is used throughout the game to solve various puzzles.

==== Dark Flight ====
Drawn: Dark Flight is the second installment in the Drawn series. Collector's edition of the game was released on September 1, 2010 and standard edition on October 2, 2010. It was first released on Windows and OS X and later on October 6, 2011 for iOS. It continues where the previous game leaves off, with Iris having escaped the Tower and still in need of help. The player must explore the Kingdom of Stonebriar and help Iris light the three beacons, so that she can become Queen of the kingdom and dethrone the dark King.

==== Trail of Shadows ====
Drawn: Trail of Shadows is the third installment in the Drawn series. It tells the story of a young boy trapped in the painted world by an evil wizard, as told to Iris, the protagonist of the first two games, by her guardian. It was released for Windows and OS X on 19 October 2011 for all and for Big Fish Game Club members on 20 October.

=== Remastered series ===
==== Redrawn The Painted Tower ====
Redrawn: The Painted Tower was released on November 5, 2021 and the first game produced by Friendly Fox Studios...The game will be reboot of the first game with new and updated graphics system .

== Reception ==
The Drawn games were well received by reviewers. Gamezebo offered a four-and-a-half star review of The Painted Tower, and a five-star review of Dark Flight. IGN offered a 7.5 (Good) rating for Dark Flight. Both were lauded for their hand-drawn art style, their strong storylines, and their seamless integration of the various gameplay elements. Dark Flight received an 8/10 from Eurogamer, it was praised for its visuals and atmosphere, and criticized for its short length and abrupt ending.

In 2011, Adventure Gamers named The Painted Tower the 76th-best adventure game ever released. During the 13th Annual Interactive Achievement Awards, the Academy of Interactive Arts & Sciences nominated The Painted Tower for "Casual Game of the Year". Two years later, the Academy also nominated Trail of Shadows, this time in the "Downloadable Game of the Year" category.
