= Monsters Ate My Condo =

2011 video game

- Developer: PikPok
- Publisher: Adult Swim Games
- Platforms: iOS, Android
- Release: September 15, 2011
- Genre: Puzzle

Monsters Ate My Condo was an iOS tile-matching video game developed by PikPok and released on September 15, 2011 by Adult Swim Games for $0.99. A sequel, Super Monsters Ate My Condo, was released in 2012.

== Gameplay ==
The main goal of the game is to feed four unique monsters their specific color-coded floors of a condo. These monsters, dubbed Boat Head, Reginald Starfire, Mr. Shigoto and Lord Ferocious, are fed the floors of the condo through the player swiping the appropriately-colored floors to them in either Endless or Timed Attack mode. When you match three or more of the same color, you earn additional point and switch out one of the present monsters for another. However, it's game over if you either fail to keep the condo tower straight or feed the wrong colored-condo floor to the wrong monster too many times.

== Reception ==
=== Monsters Ate My Condo ===
The game had a Metacritic rating of 87% based on 14 critic reviews.

Modojo deemed it "a bizarre but immensely satisfying experience, thanks in part to the addictive premise, excessively colorful graphics, NES style music and online leaderboards. " Pocket GamerUK called it "The best Adult Swim title to date, and a squeak away from classic status." Gamezebo said "Some people may decry the lack of variety involved (the game only offer two modes – endless and time attack), but games like this don't need to be anything more than what they are to be a success. Now if you'll excuse me, I have some monsters to feed. "

During the 15th Annual Interactive Achievement Awards, the Academy of Interactive Arts & Sciences nominated Monsters Ate My Condo for "Casual Game of the Year".

=== Super Monsters Ate My Condo ===
The game had a Metacritic score of 86% based on 9 critic reviews.

TouchArcade wrote "If you enjoyed the first Monsters Ate My Condo, I think this is an upgrade that's worth your time and dollar. It looks better, it sounds better, and it still has that completely wacky style that's almost impossible not to love. " Gamezebo said "Unless you play MAMC strictly for Endless Mode, Super Monsters Ate My Condo is absolutely the superior game and what the original should have been, even if we didn't realize it at the time. It retains all of the ridiculous charm and ingenuity from its predecessor, sandwiched between more, more, more: more content, more hooks, and more fun. That's a combo any monster would salivate over". Modojo said "If you're one of those boring old-fashioned gamers who values crazy things like fun, compulsion, and competitiveness, you really owe it to yourself to grab this stellar action-puzzler. "
