= Build-a-lot =

2007 video game

- Developer: HipSoft
- Publishers: HipSoft, MumboJumbo
- Platforms: Windows, Mac OS X, Nintendo DS, iOS, Mobile phone, BlackBerry
- Release: October 3, 2007: Windows; NA: October 3, 2007 Mac OS X; NA: February 28, 2008 Nintendo DS; NA: December 9, 2008 iOS; NA: March 23, 2009 Mobile phone; NA: March 23, 2009; EU: March 23, 2009 Blackberry; NA: August 12, 2009
- Genre: Business simulation
- Mode: Single player

Build-a-lot is a 2007 casual video game for Microsoft Windows. The object of the game is to construct, upgrade and sell houses for profits. They can flip houses for quick cash or collect rent to make funds go up. Players help mayors from eight different areas and through 35 different levels to complete the game. Build-a-lot was created by HipSoft. It has also been ported to Mac OS X by Red Marble Games. In 2009 it was ported to mobile phones, iOS systems and BlackBerry's by Glu Mobile. It was ported to the Nintendo eShop and DSI shop on August 18, 2011. In July 2013, Build-a-lot 3 and Build-a-lot 4: Power Source was ported to Android by Glu Mobile again

== Gameplay ==
=== Game modes ===
There are two game modes in Build-a-lot: career mode and casual mode. In career mode, the object is to complete levels in which the player is assigned a set of tasks. In casual mode, the object is to meet a cash balance goal in the shortest time possible.

In career mode, the player's object is to complete a set of tasks in an individual game scenario, or "level". After doing so, they can advance to the next scenario. Once a level is completed, that level is available for play to that player on a continuing basis. Career mode has a total of thirty-five different levels, which are grouped together in eight different "neighborhoods" of between three and five levels. Each "neighborhood" has a different number of lots and different mayor. The neighborhoods advance in terms of game complexity. New structures become available at higher levels, and goals become more difficult.

In casual mode, the player's goal in each level is solely monetary—reaching a predetermined level of cash. The player may achieve that goal using any strategy, and is not required to build any particular house or building. However, in each casual mode game, the player is given only a starting cache of cash, workers, and materials. Other than the smallest of the housing blueprints, the player must purchase the blueprint for any house or building the player would like to build.

Only six neighborhoods are available for play in casual mode, as opposed to the eight neighborhoods in career mode. The six neighborhoods available in casual mode are the last six neighborhoods in career mode.

=== Building types ===
There are three main building types in the game: Houses, Functional Buildings, and Cultural Buildings.

==== Houses ====
In Build-a-lot, there are six types of houses that can be built, each with increasing requirements for materials, workers, and blueprint costs.

==== Functional buildings ====
Functional buildings assist the player in some aspect of completing a level or achieving a monetary goal. There are three functional buildings: the Sawmill, the Workshop, and the Bank.

- The Sawmill reduces the prices of materials by 50%, speeds up the delivery of materials, and players to purchase building "permits" that allow players to upgrade houses to 4-star houses.
- The Workshop reduces the price of "training" workers by 50%, speeds up the construction, upgrading, and repair of houses and buildings, and allows players to perform "inspections" that serve to prevent houses from needing repairs.
- The Bank generates interest on the amount of money in the player's account, at the rate of 10% per interest period. If "donated", it does not generate interest, but prevents a player from being responsible for paying property taxes.

An additional building, CostMart, is unlocked if the player completes all levels of the career mode of the game at a "high efficiency" or "star" level. It may be used in re-playing levels of the career mode, where it provides "profit-sharing"—a trickle of cash—and a trickle of free materials. It seems not to be available during the casual mode of the game.

==== Cultural buildings ====
Cultural buildings are relevant to the career mode of the game, and are frequently the goals of particular levels.

The various cultural buildings are often tied to the personal interests of the Mayors, and also tie into the special gift given to the builder once a city is complete.

== Reception & awards ==
Build-a-lot was the #1 Action/Arcade game of 2007 on Big Fish Games. Build-a-lot was Casual-Game-of-the-Week at killerbetties.com, who highlighted the simple but smooth and pleasing animation, sound effects and surprisingly fun micromanagement. It was rated 4.5 out of 5 stars by Yahoo! Games users.

It was named Big Fish Games "Action/Arcade Game of the Year", and RealArcade named it "Strategy Game of the Year". It received a nomination for "Downloadable Game of the Year" during the 11th Annual Interactive Achievement Awards.

== Sequels ==
A sequel to Build-a-lot was released in April 2008. It is called Build-a-lot: Town of the Year. According to reviews, it allows players to build parks and stores. It requires more micro-managing as players will not only build stores, but manage their inventories and appearance. It removes several elements of Build-a-lot gameplay and replaces them with new elements. For example, premier properties are gone and a "curb appeal" feature is added where houses can be painted and landscaped to increase desirability and property value.

A second sequel, Build-a-lot 3: Passport to Europe was released in 2008. In it, players travel to several European nations and build a variety of improvements, including landmarks and European-style houses. It retains most of the elements of the previous two games, but adds some new options, such as restoring run-down buildings. It reinstates the premier lots from the first version, but these are much less often relevant to play. Like the previous two games, it is available via several casual game distributors, as well as HipSoft's own website.

Another sequel, Build-a-lot 4: Power Source, was made available for download in August, 2009. It includes a "power" resource, requiring players to build neighborhoods that do not exceed their power availability.

Build-a-lot: Monopoly edition was released on the 2nd September 2009 and is based on Build-a-lot but does include facilities such as hotels and train stations. Also, instead of having fictitious neighborhoods or cities like the original Build-a-lot and Build-a-lot 2, the game uses the properties on the standard Monopoly game board. Also, instead of dollars being used, all values are measured in Monos.

Build-a-lot: The Elizabethan Era was released in 2010. Set in Elizabethan England, the player manages farms and livestock in addition to real estate and deals with problems like vermin infestation. A Premium Edition was made available that included additional levels and property, as well as a strategy guide and behind-the-scenes material. The "host" of the game is of course, none other than Queen Elizabeth herself.

Build-a-lot: On Vacation! was released on September 7 of 2011, Build-a-lot: Fairy Tales was released in 2012, Build-a-lot: Mysteries was released in 2013, Build-a-lot: Mysteries 2 and Build-a-lot World were released in 2014, and Build-a-lot: Big Dreams was released in 2020.
