= Tiny Wings =

2011 video game

- App Store icon
- Developer: Andreas Illiger
- Publisher: Andreas Illiger
- Platforms: iOS, tvOS
- Release: February 18, 2011; HD version: July 12, 2012 tvOS: December 1, 2016
- Genre: Action
- Modes: Single-player, multiplayer

Tiny Wings is an iOS game developed by German game developer Andreas Illiger, released on February 18, 2011. It was the top-grossing game in the App Store for two weeks from late February to early March 2011. The app was voted best iPhone game of the year in 2011 and has sold at least 10.5 million copies on iPhone and 1.8 million copies on iPad based on Apple's Game Center statistics.

An Apple TV-specific version called Tiny Wings TV was released on December 1, 2016. An Apple Arcade version for iOS and tvOS alike was released on October 15, 2021.

== Gameplay ==
In Tiny Wings, the player takes control of a bird whose wings are too small to fly. The goal of the game is to use hills in order to gain speed and flap as long as possible. This is done by tapping and holding the screen in order to make the bird drop. The game play mainly revolves around timing the player's taps so that the bird slides down hills and flies up them. The game features special missions to upgrade the player's nest and increase their score multiplier. These challenges revolve around reaching specific islands or achieving certain feats a number of times in one game. The game's visuals are procedurally generated, making it look different every day. An alternative game mode allows the player to race against three other birds controlled by AI.

== Development ==
Designer Andreas Illiger made the game with the "dream of flying" and positive emotions in mind. He wanted to contrast games that are "destructive and negative." When designing the game, he designed it while considering whether a 1.5-year-old child could play it. According to Illiger, the core mechanic of Tiny Wings is inspired by Nathan McCoy's Wavespark. Development took about seven months, with little changing from the original concept.

== Reception ==
Reception

Aggregate score
Aggregator	Score
Metacritic	85/100 (HD) 92/100

Review score
Publication	Score
TouchArcade	5/5 (HD) 5/5

The game has received highly positive reviews. Many reviewers praised the game's simple gameplay but complex nuances. IGN gave the game a score of 8.0/10 and said that it "comes together as a very playable simple pleasure." Slide to Play gave the game a perfect 4/4 and said that the game is "brilliant in its simplicity, originality, and ability to keep you coming back again and again." Games Pundit gave the game 8.5/10 saying that "It's one of those games that you can just pick up and play to eat up 10 minutes of time and have some fun too." The game was featured by Apple senior vice president Scott Forstall as a "mind controllingly addictive game" at Apple's 2011 Worldwide Developer's Conference. During the 15th Annual Interactive Achievement Awards, the Academy of Interactive Arts & Sciences nominated Tiny Wings for "Casual Game of the Year".
