= CastleVille =

2011 video game

- Developer: Zynga Dallas
- Publisher: Zynga
- Platform: Adobe Flash
- Release: Facebook; November 2011
- Genres: Simulation, role-playing
- Mode: Single-player with multiplayer interaction

CastleVille is a defunct social network game made by Zynga's Dallas studio and was released in November 2011. It combined a number of elements from the company's other "Ville" range of games. On launch it had received a million "likes" on Facebook. By the end of its first month, it had become the fifth most popular game on Facebook with 26.5 million players. The game was a freemium game, meaning there is no cost to play but players have the option of purchasing premium content.

Zynga created a sequel called CastleVille Legends in early 2013.

CastleVille shut down on 30 April 2016.

== Gameplay ==
Set in a medieval world, the game allows players to build their land up with castle elements, and craft armor, art and trade items. The objective is to explore the unknown land around the starting territory and expand the player's empire into it. The character's avatar can be customized, and the world features peasants, pirates, princesses and Vikings. A new reputation system was developed to encourage players to be social within the game in order to unlock new items and actions such as trading.

== Development and release ==
CastleVille was developed by Zynga Dallas, which was purchased by Zynga in October 2010 for an undisclosed sum. It was the Dallas studio's first release under Zynga management, and the first social game to feature its own orchestral and choir soundtrack. Originally announced in October 2011, it was launched in seventeen languages. It was released a couple of weeks prior to Zynga's stock market launch.

The production team's aim was to take the best elements of the other Zynga "Ville" games and combine them into one package. Storytelling features were brought from The Pioneer Trail, while CityVille and FarmVille provided the inspiration for city building and self-expression, respectively. The game's Creative Director, Bill Jackson, said that it was aimed to be a deep online game like World of Warcraft.

The game was announced in October 2011.

== Reception ==
At launch in November 2011, an official page on Facebook for CastleVille had already received a million "likes". It had gained five million players by 21 November, compared to the top rated game, CityVille, which had only reached 3.2 million players after five days. Within a month, CastleVille was ranked #5 on the most popular Facebook games, having accumulated 26.5 million players. Its entry into the top twenty games came at a cost to its own creators: CastleVille forced an older Zynga game, The Pioneer Trail, out of the list.

Jon Swartz previewed the game for USA Today, thought the game had similarities in design to the Shrek franchise, but described it as Zynga's crown jewel. Andrew Webster, reviewing CastleVille for Gamezebo, said that the release wouldn't "revolutionize social gaming", but because of "arguably the best visual and audio experience on Facebook", it was still one of the best games on Facebook. He gave the game four and a half stars of five.

During the 15th Annual Interactive Achievement Awards, the Academy of Interactive Arts & Sciences nominated CastleVille for "Social Networking Game of the Year".
