= 15th Annual Interactive Achievement Awards =

Video game award ceremony

- Date: February 9, 2012
- Venue: Red Rock Casino, Resort & Spa
- Country: Las Vegas, Nevada, USA
- Hosted by: Jay Mohr

Highlights
- Most awards: The Elder Scrolls V: Skyrim (5)
- Most nominations: Uncharted 3: Drake's Deception (12)
- Game of the Year: The Elder Scrolls V: Skyrim
- Hall of Fame: Tim Sweeney
- Pioneer: Ed Logg

The 15th Annual Interactive Achievement Awards was the 15th edition of the Interactive Achievement Awards, an annual awards event that honored the best games in the video game industry during 2011. The awards were arranged by the Academy of Interactive Arts & Sciences (AIAS) and were held at the Red Rock Casino, Resort & Spa in Las Vegas, Nevada on February 9, 2012. It was also held as part of the Academy's 2012 D.I.C.E. Summit, and was hosted by stand-up comedian Jay Mohr. It would be the final year that it would be called the Interactive Achievement Awards.

Separate awards for "Handheld Game of the Year" and "Mobile Game of the Year" were offered instead of "Portable Game of the Year". The award for "Downloadable Game of the Year" was reintroduced as a "Game of the Year" award. The award for "Outstanding Achievement in Connectivity" was introduced. The award for "Outstanding Achievement in Soundtrack" was no longer offered.

The Elder Scrolls V: Skyrim and its developer/publisher Bethesda Softworks won the most awards, including "Game of the Year". Uncharted 3: Drake's Deception received the most nominations. Electronic Arts received the most nominations, published the most nominees, and had the most award-winning games.

Tim Sweeney, founder of Epic Games and creator of the Unreal Engine, was inducted into the Academy of Interactive Arts & Sciences Hall of Fame. Ed Logg, game designer behind Atari classics such as Asteroids, Super Breakout, and Centipede, received of the "Pioneer Award".

== Winners and Nominees ==
Winners are listed first, highlighted in boldface, and indicated with a double dagger (‡).

=== Game of the Year awards ===
**Game of the Year**: **The Elder Scrolls V: Skyrim** — **Bethesda Game Studios**‡; Batman: Arkham City — Rocksteady Studios, Warner Bros. Interactive Entertainment; Portal 2 — Valve; The Legend of Zelda: Skyward Sword — Nintendo EAD; Uncharted 3: Drake's Deception — Naughty Dog, Sony Computer Entertainment
**Downloadable Game of the Year**: **Bastion** — **Supergiant Games**, **Warner Bros. Interactive Entertainment**‡; Drawn: Trail of Shadows — Big Fish Studios; Insanely Twisted Shadow Planet — Shadow Planet Productions, Microsoft Studios; Ms. Splosion Man — Twisted Pixel Games, Microsoft Studios; Orcs Must Die! — Robot Entertainment, Microsoft Studios	**Handheld Game of the Year**: **Super Mario 3D Land** — **Nintendo EAD**‡; Ghost Trick: Phantom Detective — Capcom; Kirby Mass Attack — HAL Laboratory, Nintendo; Mario Kart 7 — Nintendo EAD; Professor Layton and the Last Specter — Level-5, Nintendo
**Mobile Game of the Year**: **Infinity Blade II** — **Chair Entertainment**, **Epic Games**‡; Contre Jour — Mokus, Chillingo; Dead Space — IronMonkey Studios, Electronic Arts; Tentacles: Enter the Dolphin — Press Play, Microsoft Studios; The Dark Meadow — Phosphor Studios	**Outstanding Innovation in Gaming**: **Skylanders: Spyro's Adventure** — **Toys for Bob**, **XPEC Entertainment**, **Vicarious Visions**, **Activision**‡; Bastion — Supergiant Games, Warner Bros. Interactive Entertainment; L.A. Noire — Team Bondi, Rockstar Games; Portal 2 — Valve; The Elder Scrolls V: Skyrim — Bethesda Game Studios

=== Craft awards ===
**Outstanding Achievement in Game Direction**: **The Elder Scrolls V: Skyrim** — **Bethesda Game Studios**‡; Batman: Arkham City — Rocksteady Studios, Warner Bros. Interactive Entertainment; L.A. Noire — Team Bondi, Rockstar Games; Portal 2 — Valve; Uncharted 3: Drake's Deception — Naughty Dog, Sony Computer Entertainment
**Outstanding Achievement in Animation**: **Uncharted 3: Drake's Deception** — **Naughty Dog**, **Sony Computer Entertainment**‡; Assassin's Creed: Revelations — Ubisoft Montreal; Batman: Arkham City — Rocksteady Studios, Warner Bros. Interactive Entertainment; L.A. Noire — Team Bondi, Rockstar Games; Rayman Origins — Ubisoft Montpellier	**Outstanding Achievement in Art Direction**: **Uncharted 3: Drake's Deception** — **Naughty Dog**, **Sony Computer Entertainment**‡; Batman: Arkham City — Rocksteady Studios, Warner Bros. Interactive Entertainment; Battlefield 3 — DICE, Electronic Arts; Portal 2 — Valve; Rayman Origins — Ubisoft Montpellier
**Outstanding Achievement in Character Performance**: **Wheatley** **(Portal 2)** — **Valve**‡; Adam Jensen (Deus Ex: Human Revolution) — Eidos-Montréal, Square Enix Europe; Cole Phelps (L.A. Noire) — Team Bondi, Rockstar Games; Nathan Drake (Uncharted 3: Drake's Deception) — Naughty Dog, Sony Computer Entertainment; Victor Sullivan (Uncharted 3: Drake's Deception) — Naughty Dog, Sony Computer Entertainment	**Outstanding Achievement in Connectivity**: **Portal 2** — **Valve**‡; Battlefield 3 — DICE, Electronic Arts; Call of Duty: Modern Warfare 3 — Infinity Ward, Activision; Dragon Age II — BioWare, Electronic Arts; Uncharted 3: Drake's Deception — Naughty Dog, Sony Computer Entertainment
**Outstanding Achievement in Gameplay Engineering**: **The Elder Scrolls V: Skyrim** — **Bethesda Game Studios**‡; Batman: Arkham City — Rocksteady Studios, Warner Bros. Interactive Entertainment; Portal 2 — Valve; Skylanders: Spyro's Adventure — Toys for Bob, XPEC Entertainment, Vicarious Visions, Activision; The Legend of Zelda: Skyward Sword — Nintendo EAD	**Outstanding Achievement in Online Gameplay**: **Star Wars: The Old Republic** — **BioWare Austin**, **Electronic Arts**‡; Battlefield 3 — DICE, Electronic Arts; Call of Duty: Modern Warfare 3 — Infinity Ward, Activision; Gears of War 3 — Epic Games, Microsoft Studios; LittleBigPlanet 2 — Media Molecule, Sony Computer Entertainment
**Outstanding Achievement in Original Music Composition**: **Portal 2** — **Valve**‡; Infamous 2 — Sucker Punch Productions, Sony Computer Entertainment; L.A. Noire — Team Bondi, Rockstar Games; LittleBigPlanet 2 — Media Molecule, Sony Computer Entertainment; Uncharted 3: Drake's Deception — Naughty Dog, Sony Computer Entertainment	**Outstanding Achievement in Sound Design**: **Battlefield 3** — **DICE**, **Electronic Arts**‡; Call of Duty: Modern Warfare 3 — Infinity Ward, Activision; L.A. Noire — Team Bondi, Rockstar Games; Need for Speed: The Run — EA Black Box; Uncharted 3: Drake's Deception — Naughty Dog, Sony Computer Entertainment
**Outstanding Achievement in Story**: **The Elder Scrolls V: Skyrim** — **Bethesda Game Studios**‡; Bastion — Supergiant Games, Warner Bros. Interactive Entertainment; L.A. Noire — Team Bondi, Rockstar Games; Portal 2 — Valve; Uncharted 3: Drake's Deception — Naughty Dog, Sony Computer Entertainment	**Outstanding Achievement in Visual Engineering**: **Uncharted 3: Drake's Deception** — **Naughty Dog**, **Sony Computer Entertainment**‡; Battlefield 3 — DICE, Electronic Arts; Crysis 2 — Crytek, Electronic Arts; L.A. Noire — Team Bondi, Rockstar Games; Rage — id Software, Bethesda Softworks

=== Genre awards ===
**Action Game of the Year**: **Call of Duty: Modern Warfare 3** — **Infinity Ward**, **Activision**‡; Battlefield 3 — DICE, Electronic Arts; Dead Space 2 — Visceral Games, Electronic Arts; Gears of War 3 — Epic Games, Microsoft Studios; Saints Row: The Third — Volition, THQ	**Adventure Game of the Year**: **Batman: Arkham City** — **Rocksteady Studios**, **Warner Bros. Interactive Entertainment**‡; L.A. Noire — Team Bondi, Rockstar Games; Portal 2 — Valve; The Legend of Zelda: Skyward Sword — Nintendo EAD; Uncharted 3: Drake's Deception — Naughty Dog, Sony Computer Entertainment
**Casual Game of the Year**: **Fruit Ninja Kinect** — **Halfbrick Studios**, **Microsoft Studios**‡; Jetpack Joyride — Halfbrick Studios; Monsters Ate My Condo — Adult Swim Games, PikPok; Tiny Wings — Andreas Illiger; Where's My Water? — Disney Interactive	**Social Networking Game of the Year**: **The Sims Social** — **Playfish**, **Electronic Arts**‡; Army Attack — Digital Chocolate; CastleVille — Zynga Dallas; Gardens of Time — Playdom, Disney Interactive; Triple Town — Spry Fox, Playdom
**Family Game of the Year**: **LittleBigPlanet 2** — **Media Molecule**, **Sony Computer Entertainment**‡; Dance Central 2 — Harmonix, Microsoft Studios; Just Dance 3 — Ubisoft Paris; Kinect: Disneyland Adventures — Frontier Developments, Microsoft Studios; Skylanders: Spyro's Adventure — Toys for Bob, XPEC Entertainment, Vicarious Visions, Activision	**Fighting Game of the Year**: **Mortal Kombat** — **NetherRealm Studios**, **Warner Bros. Interactive Entertainment**‡; Fight Night Champion — EA Canada; Super Street Fighter IV: 3D Edition — Capcom; The King of Fighters XIII — SNK Playmore, Atlus; Ultimate Marvel vs. Capcom 3 — Capcom
**Role-Playing/Massively Multiplayer Game of the Year**: **The Elder Scrolls V: Skyrim** — **Bethesda Game Studios**‡; Dark Souls — FromSoftware, Namco Bandai Games; Deus Ex: Human Revolution — Eidos-Montréal, Square Enix Europe; Star Wars: The Old Republic — BioWare Austin, Electronic Arts; The Witcher 2: Assassins of Kings — CD Projekt Red	**Racing Game of the Year**: **Forza Motorsport 4** — **Turn 10 Studios**, **Microsoft Studios**‡; Mario Kart 7 — Nintendo EAD; Real Racing 2 HD — Firemint, Electronic Arts
**Sports Game of the Year**: **FIFA 12** — **EA Canada**‡; Madden NFL 12 — EA Tiburon; MLB 11: The Show — SCE San Diego; NBA 2K12 — Visual Concepts, 2K Games; NBA Jam: On Fire Edition — EA Tiburon	**Strategy/Simulation Game of the Year**: **Orcs Must Die!** — **Robot Entertainment**, **Microsoft Studios**‡; Iron Brigade — Double Fine Productions, Microsoft Studios; Total War: Shogun 2 — Creative Assembly, Sega; Toy Soldiers: Cold War — Signal Studios, Microsoft Studios; Warhammer 40,000: Dawn of War II - Retribution — Relic Entertainment, THQ

=== Special awards ===
==== Hall of Fame ====
- Tim Sweeney

==== Pioneer ====
- Ed Logg

=== Multiple nominations and awards ===
==== Multiple Nominations ====
Games that received multiple nominations
Nominations	Game
12	Uncharted 3: Drake's Deception
10	Portal 2
9	L.A. Noire
6	Batman: Arkham City
6	Battlefield 3
6	The Elder Scrolls V: Skyrim
4	Call of Duty: Modern Warfare 3
3	Bastion
3	LittleBigPlanet 2
3	Skylanders: Spyro's Adventure
3	The Legend of Zelda: Skyward Sword
2	Deus Ex: Human Revolution
2	Gears of War 3
2	Mario Kart 7
2	Orcs Must Die!
2	Rayman Origins
2	Star Wars: The Old Republic

Nominations by company
Nominations	Games	Company
19	13	Electronic Arts
17	4	Sony Computer Entertainment
13	11	Microsoft Studios
12	1	Naughty Dog
10	3	Warner Bros. Interactive Entertainment
10	1	Valve
9	1	Rockstar Games
9	1	Team Bondi
8	5	Nintendo
7	2	Activision
7	2	Bethesda Softworks
6	1	DICE
6	1	Rocksteady Studios
4	3	Ubisoft
4	1	Infinity Ward
3	3	Capcom
3	2	BioWare
3	2	Epic Games
3	1	Media Molecule
3	1	Supergiant Games
3	1	Toys for Bob
3	1	Vicarious Visions
3	1	XPEC Entertainment
2	2	Disney Interactive
2	2	Halfbrick Studios
2	2	Playdom
2	2	THQ
2	1	Eidos-Montréal
2	1	Robot Entertainment
2	1	Square Enix Europe

==== Multiple awards ====
Games that received multiple awards
Awards	Game
5	The Elder Scrolls V: Skyrim
3	Portal 2
3	Uncharted 3: Drake's Deception

Awards by company
Awards	Games	Company
5	1	Bethesda Softworks
4	4	Electronic Arts
4	2	Sony Computer Entertainment
3	3	Microsoft Studios
3	3	Warner Bros. Interactive Entertainment
3	1	Naughty Dog
3	1	Valve
2	2	Activision
