= VGChartz =

Video game sales tracking website

- Website type: Video game sales tracking, video game journalism
- Owner: Brett Walton
- Creator: Brett Walton
- Website: http://www.vgchartz.com
- Launched: June 2005; 21 years ago

The VGChartz Network is a collection of five video game websites: VGChartz, gamrFeed, gamrReview, gamrTV, and gamrConnect. VGChartz sits at the center of the network and is a video game sales tracking website, providing weekly sales figures of console software and hardware by region. The site was launched in June 2005, and is owned by Brett Walton. Employing ten people, VGChartz provides tools for worldwide data analysis and regular reviews of the data it provides.

VGChartz provides tools for data analysis, charting, and regular reviews and examinations of major data news in the video gaming industry. Sales figures on VGChartz are based on estimates extrapolated from small retail samples. While offering some information about their methodology through their website, VGChartz does not publish any of their data sources. Some sites, including Gamasutra and Wired News, have questioned the reliability of the information presented by the site. VGChartz has defended the credibility and reliability of its sales data, often comparing their numbers with the ones published by NPD Group, although some charts have been retroactively adjusted to better match NPD's monthly reports.

== History ==
VGChartz being used to display the sales of different SKUs of The Simpsons Game

VGChartz began in June 2005, when Brett Walton created an area on everythingandnothing.org.uk (as the site he had created at the time) called "videogame sales charts" which collected publicly available videogame sales data in one place for users to view. In July 2006, Brett launched VGCharts.org, a stand-alone version of the sub-site on everythingandnothing and still collecting publicly available data together from across the web. In March 2007, Brett bought the VGChartz.com domain and rebranded the site as VGChartz. With this re-launch came the move from collecting publicly available data to carrying out original research on the videogame market, and VGChartz began to produce its own weekly charts.

In June 2008, Robert Pasarella wrote an article comparing VGChartz and NPD services, advantages and disadvantages, with VGChartz being the winner due to the modality on their service. However, in the same month Simon Carless wrote an article in which he criticized VGChartz for the poor tracking of a video game Iron Man in comparison to NPD, for adjusting data to match other sales tracking firms in certain cases, and for making educated guesses for some figures data in other regions. Brett argued against the claims made by Simon, indicating that he had cherry-picked certain pieces of data to present VGChartz in a bad light rather than present a fair evaluation of the data.

With the launch of PlayStation Move and Kinect towards the end of 2010, renewed interest in the videogame market led VGChartz to report estimates for initial sales of both pieces of hardware. Aaron Greenberg, Microsoft Chief of Staff for Interactive Entertainment Business, openly criticized VGChartz data for Kinect on his Twitter feed, later adding "Sorry if my note offended." The comments from Greenberg prompted Walton to write an editorial, "Why it is so Easy to Blame VGChartz," in which he addressed why media organizations and publishers try to undermine the data and methods on the site.

== Criticism ==
Many websites and editors criticize VGChartz for how they obtain and verify their data. In response, VGChartz has stated that they use "a number of proprietary [sic] and ever-developing methods". Critics have noted that the website is ad-supported and claims to track every country's individual hardware and software sales to a single digit, something not even Microsoft or Sony are always capable of achieving.

== VGChartz Network ==
In June 2010, VGChartz launched the VGChartz Network with VGChartz remaining as the site for sales data. gamrReview was launched as a home for the network's reviews and previews. gamrFeed was launched as a blog-style site for news, editorials, and features. It also aggregates the content from VGChartz and gamrReview. gamrConnect was launched as a site dedicated to the VGChartz community.

VGChartz provides sales data for all current gaming consoles and portables, as well as retail gaming software for all major platforms. The main service provided by VG Chartz is weekly charts of hardware and software sales for the video game consoles sold by Nintendo, Sony, and Microsoft. This data is presented in three separate charts that each cover one of the three main video game markets (Japan, North America, and EMEAA encompassing Europe, Middle-East, Africa and Asia). The site does provide sales charts for many older consoles, but with the exception of the PlayStation 2, the regular updates focus on the current generation of home consoles and handhelds. The sales figures database can be analyzed with tools on the site for data analysis and graphical representation purposes. Tools available include: 1) Americas pre-orders, which lists all upcoming titles and the weekly change, 2) Hardware table, where users can see a subset of the data in table form by region and console between set. start and end dates, 3) Million sellers, a table of console software that has sold over a million copies according to the publishers' data is shown, 4) Weekly Records, a chart listing the top selling title in a given week from release, and 5) Milestones, a chart listing the quickest games to a given sales milestone.

gamrFeed is a gaming news blog that features breaking news stories, features, editorials and sales articles. gamrReview features reviews and previews of games as well as a video game database that features reviews, release dates, screenshots, details, cheats, sales data and more. gamrConnect is the social branch of the network featuring active forums and profiles that feature comment walls and a game collection. Users can rate games that they own on a 1-10 scale, as well as comment on various video games own comment walls.
