= Skulls of the Shogun =

2013 video game

- Developer: 17-Bit
- Publishers: 17-Bit; Microsoft Studios (Xbox 360, Windows Phone)
- Engine: XNA; MonoGame
- Platforms: Xbox 360; Windows Phone; Microsoft Windows iOS; Android; Linux; OS X Ouya; PlayStation 4 Nintendo Switch
- Release: January 30, 2013: Xbox 360, Windows Phone January 30, 2013 Windows July 29, 2013 iOS November 27, 2013 Android, Linux, OS X May 27, 2014 Ouya October 28, 2014 PlayStation 4; NA: June 2, 2015; PAL: June 3, 2015 Nintendo Switch July 11, 2019
- Genre: Turn-based tactics
- Modes: Single-player, multiplayer

Skulls of the Shogun is a turn-based tactics video game developed by 17-Bit. The game is inspired by Advance Wars and features turn-based combat between undead samurai. Skulls of the Shogun was originally planned for a 2012 release on Xbox Live Arcade and Windows 8. Eventually it was released for Xbox 360 and Windows Phone on January 30, 2013.

In July 2013, 17-Bit released Skulls of the Shogun: Bone-A-Fide Edition on Steam for Windows XP (SP 3) and up, with 4 new campaign levels, a new character, new multiplayer levels and progression system, and developer's commentary. In May 2014, Skulls of the Shogun was released for OS X and Linux as part of a Humble Bundle. In October 2014, the game was released on Ouya. In June 2015, the Bone-a-Fide Edition was released on PlayStation 4. On July 11, 2019, a Nintendo Switch port was released.

The game was adapted into an animated web series on Nerdist, featuring John DiMaggio as General Akamoto.

== Story ==
In feudal Japan, General Akamoto stands on the verge of becoming Shogun. However, in his moment of triumph he is stabbed and killed by an unknown assailant. Arriving in the land of the dead, Akamoto learns that he must wait centuries before he can be judged worthy to enter the afterlife. Unwilling to wait he rallies other discontent samurai and makes to enter the afterlife by force. Battling the forces of the Shogun of the Dead, the ruler of the afterlife, he finds that they are taking orders from an impostor claiming to be him. He is shocked to discover it is none other than his lieutenant, Kurokawa, who reveals that it was he who killed Akamoto. Kurokawa, despite dying after Akamoto (having tripped and fallen on a spear) arrived in the after life before him, stealing his identity and the position that had been reserved for him by the Shogun.

Akamoto battles the Shogun's Generals through the four regions of the afterlife, as well as meeting the gods of each region: General Romeoka and the goddess Sakura, whom he is infatuated with, in the land of Eternal Blossoms; the ill-tempered and foul-mouthed Ikkaku and the chaotic Lightning god Raiden in the Land of Summer; the wise General Higure and Wind God Fujin, in the Land of the Golden Harvest. Unlike the others Higure recognizes Akamoto for who he is and attempts to guide him, warning of a greater danger. Defeating them Akamoto enters Kurokawa's region, the Land of Frozen Fortunes.

Confronting Kurokawa it is revealed that he and the Ice Goddess Yuki plan to usurp the Shogun, and that Yuki slowed Akamoto's arrival, allowing Kurokawa to arrive and steal his identity. Akamoto defeats them and the Shogun arrives, revealing that he knew of their treachery and had been using them to test Akamoto. Punishing the two the Shogun explains that he intends to make Akamoto his successor challenging him to defeat him and take his place.

After his defeat the Shogun passes the title onto Akamoto, revealing the eternity of misery it entails: being hated, plotted against, and enduring countless meetings. The Shogun prepares to happily pass on, but is grabbed by Akamoto. Saying that he will need help, he eats his skull absorbing his power and becoming the new Shogun.

In the bonus Forbidden Isle levels, the player takes control of an unnamed samurai. Recently arrived to the land of the dead the samurai, a lieutenant of Akamoto in life, begins looking for him. Tresspasing on the island the samurai is forced to fight through the island's guard, led by Kurokawa, whom Akamoto has charged with watching over the region. Defeating Kurokawa, the samurai pushes on to find Akamoto, who has lost his way to the bureaucratic side of the Shogun position. Meeting Akamoto, the samurai reveals himself to actually be his wife Yoko, having entered the samurai afterlife after leading her late husband's army and becoming a warrior. Akamoto is relieved that she is not a rival out to take his position, however she continues their battle, believing he has grown too relaxed and needs a challenge. The two reconcile mid battle agreeing not to fight any longer.

== Reception ==
Reception

Aggregate score
Aggregator	Score
Metacritic	(iOS) 93/100 (X360) 81/100 (PS4) 80/100 (PC) 72/100 (Switch) 60/100

Review scores
Publication	Score
Destructoid	(X360) 7.5/10
Eurogamer	(X360) 9/10
Game Informer	(X360) 8.5/10
GameRevolution	(X360) 9/10
GameSpot	(X360) 7.5/10
GameTrailers	(X360) 8.6/10
IGN	(X360) 7/10
Joystiq	(X360) 5/5
MacLife	(iOS) 4/5
Official Xbox Magazine (US)	(X360) 8.5/10
PC Gamer (UK)	(PC) 77%
Polygon	(X360) 8/10
TouchArcade	(iOS) 5/5
VentureBeat	(X360) 83/100
Digital Spy	(iOS) 5/5 (X360) 4/5
The Escapist	(X360) 4/5

The iOS version received "universal acclaim", and the Xbox 360 and PlayStation 4 versions received "favorable" reviews, while the PC and Switch versions received "mixed or average reviews", according to the review aggregation website Metacritic.

Alex De Vore of Gamezebo gave the iOS version a perfect 100, saying, "This is not only one of the more charming games in recent memory; it's one of the most impressive examples of gaming period, regardless of genre." Anthony John Agnello of Digital Trends gave the Xbox 360 version 9.5 out of 10, saying, "There is nothing about 17-Bit's game that's going to change the world. There's no revelation waiting inside its strategy, no piece of design that will transform the way we think about strategy games. It's a simple idea executed just right, which is an impressive enough feat on its own. Skulls isn't chess, but it doesn't have to be." Tate Steinlage of GameZone gave it nine out of ten, saying, "If you're looking for a title that can offer exceptional gameplay that'll last you hours upon hours (oh, and that's not $60), look no further than to 17-Bit's long-awaited Skulls of the Shogun." Adam Beck of Hardcore Gamer gave it four out of five, calling it "a massive game filled with a lengthy single player campaign and a long-lasting multiplayer component that can be played day-by-day or minute-by-minute. Patience is a virtue as Skulls of the Shogun was worth waiting for." Harry Slater of Pocket Gamer gave the Windows Phone 8 version four stars out of five, saying, "Tight, fast, and remarkably fun, Skulls of the Shogun shakes the cobwebs off the turn-based strategy genre with some style."

However, Edge gave the Xbox 360 version a score of seven out of ten while the game was still in development, calling it "Wickedly irreverent and cartoonishly outrageous." Chris Holzworth of EGMNow gave it six out of ten, saying, "Objectivity is an illusion. Perceptions and subjectivity prevail, powerfully influenced by expectations both personal and cultural. Culturally, we want the Great Gaming Renaissance, and we look to indie games to bring it to us. I want to love Skulls of the Shogun for all that I see it can be, but I have to like Skulls for all that it is. Part of that includes being boring." PJ O'Reilly of Nintendo Life gave the Switch version six stars out of ten, saying, "If you haven't played Skulls of the Shogun in any form over the past six years, we still can still heartily recommend the single-player campaign as a generous and devilishly fun slice of turn-based strategy action that perfectly suits the Switch, particularly in handheld mode. However, the fact its online multiplayer seems to be a complete bust here certainly knocks a fair amount of the wind out its sails and it's something we've sadly got to penalise the game for."

Scott Nichols of Digital Spy gave the iOS version all five stars, saying, "Even without the platform versatility of its other versions Skulls of the Shogun is still among the best strategy games to grace iOS, and one that armchair generals shouldn't pass up." Earlier, Nichols gave the Xbox 360 version four stars out of five, saying, "The enemy AI is deviously smart, and will not hesitate to take advantage of every trick you can think of and more. That also only means it is all the more satisfying when you finally learn to outsmart it, making Skulls of the Shogun a must for all hardcore armchair generals." Rob Kershaw of The Digital Fix gave the same Xbox 360 version eight out of ten, praising its accessible but challenging gameplay, whilst also noting that it was occasionally difficult to distinguish between the different units on the battlefield. Marshall Honorof of The Escapist gave it a similar score of four stars out of five, calling it "an enjoyable game with style to spare. The sharp difficulty curve and reliance on aggressive tactics bring it down somewhat, but only because it's easy to see how a few small differences in design could have earned the game a place in eternity, rather than a pleasant distraction on the long road to get there." Roger Hargreaves of Metro gave the Xbox 360, PC, and Switch versions seven out of ten, saying, "Its attempted revolution of turn-based tactics isn't quite as practical as it first seems but this is still an impressively fun, and funny, strategy game."
