= Azada (video game) =

2007 video game

- Developer: Big Fish Studios Europe
- Publisher: Big Fish Games
- Designers: Emmanuel Marty; Jerome Grandsire
- Engine: PTK
- Platforms: Windows, Mac OS X, Nintendo 3DS
- Release: Windows, Mac; June 2007; Nintendo 3DS; August 2012
- Genre: Puzzle
- Mode: Single-player

Azada is a 2007 puzzle video game developed by Big Fish Studios Europe, and distributed by Big Fish Games.

== Plot ==
Hapless adventurer Titus has been trapped for years in a magical book, for a reason that is only later revealed in the game. With the last of the magical powers he acquired while trapped, Titus transports you, the player, to his study, and asks for your help to get free. The only way he can ever be released from the book is to solve the ancient puzzles of Azada. More of the story is revealed as the player solves new puzzles.

== Gameplay ==
Azada's main mechanic consists of various puzzles within the same scene, reminiscent of Myst. There are overall ten chapters, and each can be completed only by completing a series of actions. The player must find objects hidden in the room, and then use them together or on other elements around in order to create a chain of actions that ultimately leads to solving the puzzle. For each of the stages, a time limit is given. It is susceptible to penalties in cases when objects are combined wrongly or by using a hint. When it runs out, every puzzle has to be replayed from the start.

== Reception ==
Reception

Review scores
Publication	Score
Gamezebo	PC: 4.5/5
Jeuxvideo.com	3DS: 11/20
Nintendo Life	3DS: 6/10
Just Adventure	PC: B

Azada was nominated in the Downloadable Game of the Year category during the 11th Annual Interactive Achievement Awards.

== Sequels ==
Big Fish Studios released a sequel to the game, Azada: Ancient Magic in 2008. In 2011, Azada: In Libro was released, which made few changes to the gameplay. Libro was followed up by Azada: Elementa, where the threat of Titus's uncle has to be destroyed once and for all.
