= 17-Bit =

Independent video game developer

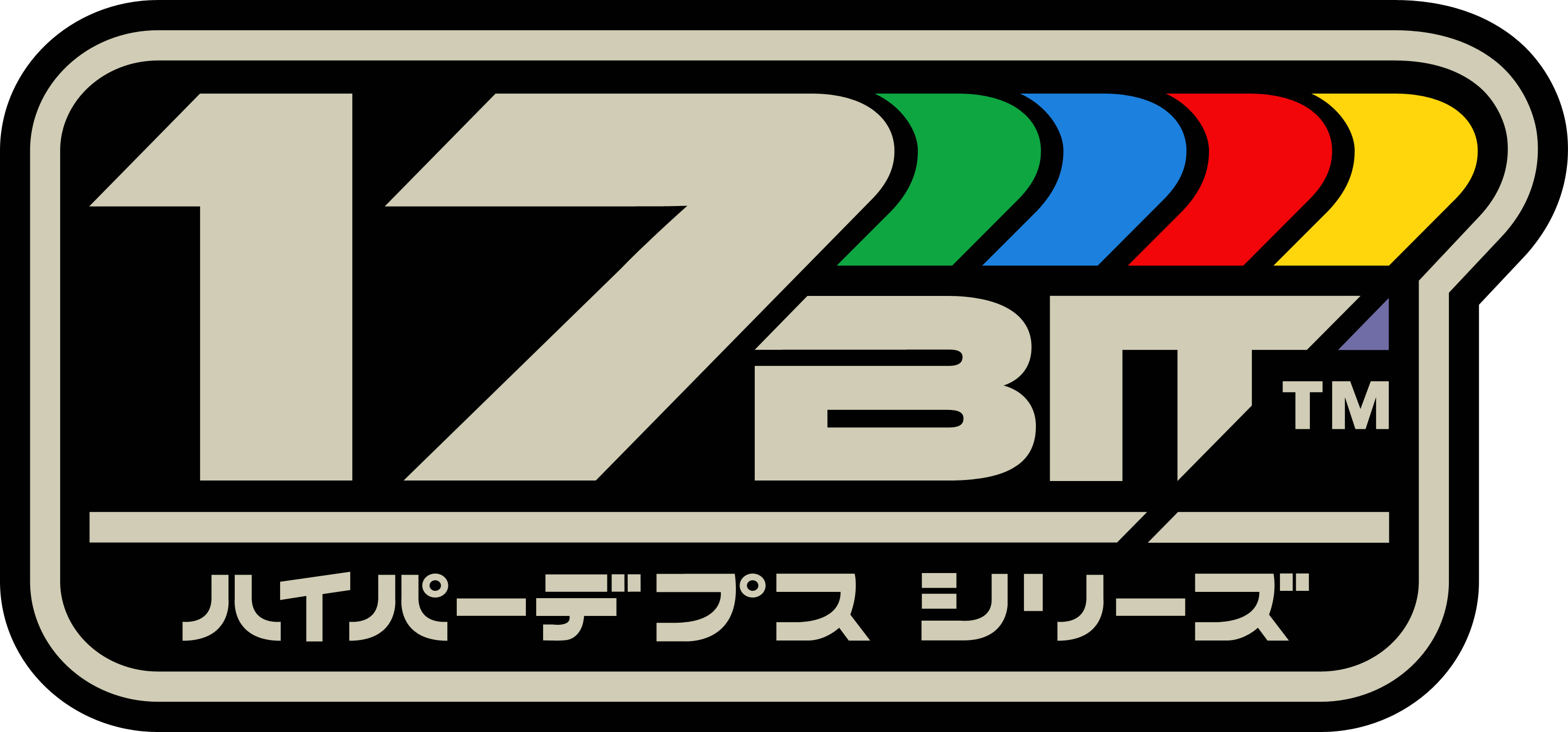
- Logo reads: ハイパーデプスシリーズ (Hyper Depth Series)
- Type: Private
- Industry: Video games
- Founded: 2009
- Founder: Jake Kazdal
- Headquarters: Nakagyo, Kyoto, Japan; Seattle, United States
- Key people: Jake Kazdal (CEO)
- Website: 17-bit.com

17-Bit is an independent video game developer. The company was founded as Haunted Temple Studios in 2009 by Jake Kazdal, formerly an artist with Sega, to make games with a 16-bit era aesthetic. The name changed to 17-Bit in May 2012 with a logo designed by Cory Schmitz. Gamasutra described the team, based in both Kyoto and Seattle, as an example of successful indie cross-platform development for its work on Skulls of the Shogun. GungHo Online Entertainment became 17-Bit's house publisher in October 2014 as the developer worked on Galak-Z: The Dimensional.

== Games developed ==
Year	Game	Platform(s)
2013	Skulls of the Shogun	Microsoft Windows, Windows Phone, Xbox 360, iOS, Android, Linux, OS X, Ouya, PlayStation 4, Nintendo Switch
2015	Galak-Z: The Dimensional	PlayStation 4, Microsoft Windows, macOS, Linux, Nintendo Switch
2021	Song in the Smoke	PlayStation 5, PlayStation 4, Microsoft Windows, Oculus Quest
TBA	Awaysis	Microsoft Windows, Xbox Series XS, Steam, PlayStation 5
