= HipSoft =

American developer of video games

HipSoft LLC
- Company type: Private
- Industry: Video games
- Founded: Redmond, Washington, U.S. (2002)
- Headquarters: Redmond, Washington, United States
- Key people: Garrett Price; Brian Goble; Bryan Bouwman; Kevin Kilstrom
- Products: Casual games
- Number of employees: 5
- Website: www.hipsoft.com

HipSoft is a Redmond, Washington-based developer of casual video games founded in 2002 by three of the original founders of Monolith Productions: Brian Goble, Garrett Price, and Bryan Bouwman. HipSoft has made over a dozen games, many of which have become popular in the casual gaming industry. Its games have been translated into many different languages and are distributed and sold worldwide through websites and retail outlets. All of the games are available for Windows and most for Mac OS X, and are being developed by partner companies for the Nintendo DS, mobile phones and other platforms.

The company's casual game Build-a-lot has been rated 4.5 out of 5 stars and "E" for "Everyone".

== Awards and nominations ==
- RealArcade Developer Contest (Digby's Donuts)
- RealArcade Word Game of the Year (Flip Words)
- Big Fish Games Action/Arcade Game of the Year (Build-a-lot)
- RealArcade Strategy Game of the Year (Build-a-lot)
- Interactive Achievement Awards Nomination for 2008 Downloadable Game of the Year (Build-a-lot)
