= Andreas Illiger =

German self-taught video game developer (born 1982)

- Born: 1982 (age 43–44); Kiel, Germany
- Occupation: Game developer
- Years active: 2009-present

Andreas Illiger (born 1982) is a German self-taught video game developer. He is the author of the 5.6 million-selling, chart-topping 2011 iOS game Tiny Wings and also of the 2009 Windows audio-visual software Microsia.

== Biographical ==
Andreas Illiger is from Kiel, Germany. He was born in 1982.
