= Otherworld (video game series) =

Otherworld (series)
- Official logo of Otherworld: Shades of Fall
- Genre: Casual games(Hidden Object Puzzle Adventure Game)
- Developer: Boomzap Entertainment
- Publisher: Big Fish Games
- Platforms: Microsoft Windows, Mac OS X, iPhone, iPad
- First release: Otherworld: Spring of Shadows; January 23, 2012
- Latest release: Otherworld: Shades of Fall; October 17, 2013

Otherworld is a series of casual hidden object puzzle adventure games with a dark fantasy theme. It was developed by Boomzap Entertainment and published exclusively by Big Fish Games. The games are available on PC and Mac platforms and with free versions for the iPhone and iPad devices.

Otherworld: Spring of Shadows was the first game to be released on January 23, 2012. A year later, a sequel was released entitled Otherworld: Omens of Summer. Both games were published with Standard and Collector's Editions. The third and final game, Otherworld: Shades of Fall Collector's Edition, was released on October 17, 2013.

Boomzap Entertainment stated in 2015 that Big Fish Games had decided not to continue the series.

== Plot/Storyline ==
Fiona was a young girl who once lived in a charming house in the countryside but she disappeared after being abducted by a menacing shadow called The Shade. She owns a locket that unveils a magical world to those who possess it. Through the help of the fairy-like creatures, Fiona must be saved from the dark creature. Magical artifacts must be found to stop The Shade and his evil minions.

== Games ==
=== Otherworld: Spring of Shadows ===
Otherworld: Spring of Shadows features a modern world wherein magic and creepy, spooky creatures, both friendly and unfriendly, exist. It is a story about a woman who, looking for peace and quiet, bought a new home, only to find that her new home is not peaceful and quiet, after all.

Otherworld: Spring of Shadows Collector's Edition was released on Big Fish Games on January 23, 2012. On the week of its release, it was found on the Top 100 PC Chart of Big Fish Games. It stayed within the Top 10 for 26 days, peaking at #2.

Otherworld: Spring of Shadows is also one of the few games that Gamezebo has given a 5/5 star rating to, with the reviewer saying that "I've got nothing bad to say. The game was pure fun, beauty and excitement from start to finish." It was also mentioned in the review that this game is "Hands down, the best hidden object game you've played in a long time."

=== Otherworld: Omens of Summer ===
Otherworld: Omens of Summer is the second game in the "Otherworld" series and like its predecessor, it is a hidden object/adventure game. In this sequel, players join Fiona, a young girl born with magic, as she stops dark creatures in this hidden-object puzzle adventure.

Otherworld: Omens of Summer was first released on February 4, 2013 exclusively for Big Fish Games. Gamezebo gave this a 4/5 star rating with the reviewer saying "...compared to other games in the genre, Omens of Summer is a paragon of beauty and innovation. It's spooky, ethereal, thought-provoking and graphically luscious..." Jay Is Games describes it as a "fairytale aimed at a more grown-up audience".

=== Otherworld: Shades of Fall ===
Otherworld: Shades of Fall is the third installment published exclusively by Big Fish Games. Like the earlier games, it is a hidden object adventure game wherein Fiona continues to search for magical artifacts that can stop the evil enemy.

Otherworld: Shades of Fall Collector's Edition was released on October 17, 2013 for both PC and Mac. On its first two weeks, this hidden object adventure game found itself within the Top 10 PC Games on Big Fish, peaking at #2. AllAboutCasualGame.com gave it an overall rating of 4.5/5 stars, adding that "creativity is vivid, the presentation is remarkable and the whole experience is just plain amazing." CasualGameGuides.com described it as a "masterpiece of a hidden object adventure game." It received a perfect overall rating of 5 stars because of its "darling characters, evil and good, its gorgeous graphics, and its can't-beat storyline."

The Standard Edition was released on November 15, 2013.

=== Otherworld: The Eternal Winter (Unreleased) ===
Boomzap Entertainment stated in 2015 that Big Fish Games had decided not to continue the series. The final game, which would have been subtitled The Eternal Winter under Boomzap, will not be released.
