= Flux Family Secrets =

- Genre: Puzzle
- Developer: Skunk Studios
- Publishers: Skunk Studios; Big Fish Games; Other various online game distributors
- Platforms: Windows, Mac OS X
- First release: Flux Family Secrets: The Ripple Effect; April 11, 2009
- Latest release: Flux Family Secrets: The Rabbit Hole; June 11, 2010

Flux Family Secrets (also known as Flux) is a series of casual puzzle personal computer games games developed by the independent game development company Skunk Studios. The series is composed of games with ‘Fractured Object’ puzzles where, in order to progress through a game, the player must find several objects that have been disassembled and hidden somewhere in the rendered scene. The games in the series are published by Big Fish Games, and are also available for download from other video game download websites.

== Development ==
Both of the games in the series have been developed by Skunk Studios. The games have relied primarily on the creation of 3D assets. In Flux Family Secrets: The Ripple Effect, character artwork was created by Overton Loyd, who has worked with creating artwork for album covers and animated television shows.

== Installments ==
=== Flux Family Secrets: The Ripple Effect ===
Flux Family Secrets: The Ripple Effect is the first game in the series, which was released on April 11, 2009. The game focuses primarily on time traveling to the past. The story beings with Jesse, the main character of the story that the player plays as, searching for the family she had never known and is brought to Flux mansion. To prove her lineage, she is put through a test where she is sent back in time in order to retrieve various historical artifacts, and is charged with fixing different aspects of history by replacing objects that have been scattered throughout time. The story begins a story-arc that continues on into the next game in the series, Flux Family Secrets: The Rabbit Hole.

=== Flux Family Secrets: The Rabbit Hole ===
Flux Family Secrets: The Rabbit Hole is the second game in the series. It was first released on June 10, 2010 as a "Collector’s Edition" game, which contains extra content as compared to the standard edition, such as additional scenes and missions. This was the first high-definition game released by Big Fish Games. The game was later released in a standard edition later that summer for a lower price. The sequel continues the story as it focuses more on the Flux mansion and some of the family members responsible for the state of things.

=== Flux Family Secrets: The Book of Oracles ===
Flux Family Secrets: The Book of oracles is the third game in the series.
