= Mediatonic =

British video game developer

Mediatonic Limited
- Type: Subsidiary
- Industry: Video games
- Founded: September 2005; 21 years ago in Uxbridge, England
- Founders: Dave Bailey; Paul Croft
- Headquarters: London, England
- Key people: Dave Bailey (CEO); Paul Croft (CGO)
- Products: Murder by Numbers; Fall Guys
- Number of employees: 230 (2020)
- Parent: Tonic Games Group (2020–present)
- Website: mediatonicgames.com

Mediatonic Limited is a British video game developer based in London. The company was founded in September 2005 by Brunel University students Dave Bailey and Paul Croft, releasing their first game, Snowman Salvage in December that year. Initially a work-for-hire studio for Flash games, Mediatonic has developed original games for other platforms, including Murder by Numbers and Fall Guys. As of June 2020, Mediatonic employs 230 people in four studios and is part of Tonic Games Group, which is a subsidiary of Epic Games since March 2021.

== History ==
Mediatonic was founded in September 2005 by friends Dave Bailey and Paul Croft, both aged 21 at the time, during their final year at Brunel University. They decided on the opening in a drunken conversation at the university's student union bar. With an office near the campus, they set up the company as a work-for-hire studio to create Flash games and sometimes skipped lectures to accept calls from clients. Snowman Salvage, a game that was part of Croft's dissertation, was Mediatonic's first release in December 2005.

PopCap Games, Big Fish Games and PlayFirst were early Mediatonic clients and, among others, Mediatonic produced Flash conversions of Bejeweled, Bookworm, Diner Dash and Poppit!. It also created Amateur Surgeon, an original game, for Adult Swim Games. Mediatonic was profitable enough in its first year that, following Bailey and Croft's graduation, the studio moved to a former government building in Westminster in February 2006 and hired ten employees. Other early games by Mediatonic included Meowcenaries, Gigolo Assassin, Must Eat Birds, and Monsters (Probably) Stole My Princess. Having reached 25 employees, Mediatonic moved to new offices near Covent Garden in February 2008.

In July 2009, Mediatonic opened a studio in Brighton to act as a digital media agency, later spun out into a company named Graphite. Mediatonic received funding from entrepreneurs Kelly Sumner, Ian Livingstone and Geoff Heath in April 2010, and from Frog Capital in January 2012. Pete Hickman, a former executive producer for Eidos Interactive, joined Mediatonic as its head of production in July 2011. Planning to double its 50-strong headcount, Mediatonic moved its London headquarters to Soho in May 2012. Mediatonic opened a Brighton development studio that October. According to Bailey, Mediatonic began giving original games and work-for-hire projects equal weight and the company grew as a result. It later branched out into publishing, opening The Irregular Corporation as a sister company in December 2015.

Mediatonic moved into Shell Mex House, London, in April 2017. In July, a five-person team was established in a co-working space in Madrid, and expanded into a proper office in July 2019. A sister development studio, Fortitude Games, was established in Guildford in 2018. Frog Capital sold its share in Mediatonic to Synova Capital, making a 7.4-times return on its investment. A fourth studio for Mediatonic in Leamington Spa was announced in February 2020. Also in early 2020, Mediatonic established its headquarters in an office above London Victoria station, although it went largely unused due to the COVID-19 pandemic causing the company to make employees work from home.

Bailey and Croft established Tonic Games Group as a parent company for Mediatonic, The Irregular Corporation, and Fortitude Games, moving 35 employees to Tonic Games Group, while Mediatonic had a staff of 230. On 2 March 2021, Epic Games announced that it had acquired Tonic Games Group, including Mediatonic. In September 2023, Mediatonic was subjected to deep job cuts by its parent company. Though it was first speculated that the entire studio had been closed, that proved not to be the case.

== Games developed ==
Year	Title	Publisher	Platform(s)
2005	Snowman Salvage	Shockwave	Web
2005	Beetle Bomp	iWin	Web
2006	Air Control	Lufthansa	Web
2007	Lego Pirates: Quest for Brickbeard's Bounty	The Lego Group	Web
2007	Operation Challenge	Pogo.com	Web
2007	Mystery Case Files: Millionheir	Nintendo	Web
2007	PlaySega Blackjack	Sega	Web
2007	Mah Jong Amazon Adventure	Sega	Web
2007	Brain Assist!	Sega	Web
2007	Letter Linker	Sega	Web
2007	Addiction Solitaire	Shockwave	Web
2007	Tequila Trouble	William Grant & Sons	Web
2007	Mole Hunt	Pogo.com	Web
2007	Homerun Hero	Shockwave	Web
2007	Horizon	AstraZeneca	Web
2007	SiteAdvisor Challenge	McAfee	Web
2007	Diamond Detective	Gamehouse	Web
2007	Battleships!	Sega	Web
2007	Meat Match	Boonty	Web
2007	Bubble Bubble	Sega	Web
2007	Super Collapse!	Gamehouse	Web
2007	Little Shop of Treasures	Gamehouse	Web
2008	Turbo Solitaire	Sega	Web
2008	Text Twist	Sega	Web
2008	Sudoku	Sega	Web
2008	Greedy Gang	Mediatonic	Web
2008	Portal Peril	Nickelodeon	Web
2008	Penguin Panic	Mediatonic	Web
2008	Word Whomp Mini	Pogo.com	Web
2008	Poppit! Mini Stressbuster	Pogo.com	Web
2008	Poppit! Stressbuster	Pogo.com	Web
2008	Bookworm	PopCap Games	Web
2008	Bejeweled 2	PopCap Games	Web
2008	Diner Dash	PlayFirst	Web
2008	Bejeweled 2	PopCap Games	Web
2008	Inca Quest	iWin	Web
2008	Talismania	PopCap Games	Web
2008	Manor Mystery	Boonty	Web
2008	Gigolo Assassin	Adult Swim	Web
2008	Aquatic Word Burst	Sega	Web
2008	Ice Shuffle	Sega	Web
2008	Greek Island Solitaire	Sega	Web
2008	Beijing 2008, High Dive	Sega	Web
2008	Beijing 2008, Archery	Sega	Web
2008	Beijing 2008, Weightlifting	Sega	Web
2008	Hidden Expedition Titanic	Big Fish Games	Web
2008	Bureaucracy Buster	AstraZeneca	Web
2008	Amateur Surgeon	Adult Swim	Web, iOS
2008	Trivial Pursuit Quiz	Electronic Arts	Web
2008	Crestor Challenge	AstraZeneca	Web
2008	Travelogue 360 Rome	Big Fish Games	Web
2008	Azada	Big Fish Games	Web
2008	Sonic at the Olympic Games	Sega	Web
2008	Music, Melodies and Rockstars	Sega	Web
2008	The Quiz of Culinary Delights	Sega	Web
2008	Back to the 80s Quiz	Sega	Web
2008	Hollywood Adventure Quiz	Sega	Web
2008	Three Reel Slots	Sega	Web
2008	Columns	Sega	Web
2008	Sega Pool	Sega	Web
2009	Commanders	Sierra Entertainment	Web
2009	Diego's Underwater Adventures	Nickelodeon	Web
2009	Dr. Kawashima's Brain Training 2	Namco Bandai Games	Feature Phones
2009	Dr. Kawashima's Brain Exercise, Line Up	Namco Bandai Games	Web
2009	Dr. Kawashima's Brain Exercise, Reverse Dice	Namco Bandai Games	Web
2009	Dr. Kawashima's Brain Exercise, Follow the Pencil	Namco Bandai Games	Web
2009	Dr. Kawashima's Brain Exercise, Predominant Number	Namco Bandai Games	Web
2009	Hidden Expedition Titanic	Big Fish Games	Web
2009	Hidden Expedition Titanic MSN Search Special	Big Fish Games	Web
2009	Hidden Expedition Everest MSN Search Special	Big Fish Games	Web
2009	Hidden Expedition Everest	Big Fish Games	Web
2009	Travelogue 360 London	Big Fish Games	Web
2009	Travelogue 360 Paris	Big Fish Games	Web
2009	Amateur Surgeon Christmas	Adult Swim	Web, iOS
2009	Fast & Furious	Sierra Entertainment	Facebook, Myspace
2009	SpongeBob SquarePants: Hooked on You	Nickelodeon	Web
2009	Sonic Level Creator	Sega	Web
2009	Steamweavers	Mediatonic	Myspace
2009	Toy Story: Woody's Great Escape	Pixar	Web
2009	Suite Life on Deck: Smoothie Service	Disney	Web
2009	Kid Vs. Kat: Katapult Katastrophe	Disney	Web
2009	Biker Blast-Off!	The Gadget Show	iOS
2009	Meowcenaries	Adult Swim	Web, iOS
2009	Extreme Lawn Bowls	Mediatonic	Web
2009	Must.Eat.Birds	Mediatonic	iOS, Android
2010	Amateur Surgeon 2	Adult Swim	Web, iOS, Android
2010	Vancouver 2010, Slalom	Sega	Web
2010	Vancouver 2010, Ski Jump	Sega	Web
2010	Vancouver 2010, Speed Skating	Sega	Web
2010	Vancouver 2010, Snowboarding	Sega	Web
2010	Moshling Boshling	Mind Candy	Web
2010	Boom Bandits	Spil Games	Web
2010	Who's That Flying?!	Mediatonic	iOS, Microsoft Windows, PlayStation Portable, PlayStation 3
2010	Monsters (Probably) Stole My Princess	Mediatonic	PlayStation Portable, PlayStation 3, Xbox 360
2010	MicroGP	Mediatonic	Facebook
2010	Pirate King	Mediatonic	Facebook
2010	Ocean Snapper	Mediatonic	Myspace, Facebook
2010	Back to the Future: Blitz Through Time	Telltale Games	Facebook, Online
2011	1000 Tiny Claws	Mediatonic	PlayStation Portable, PlayStation 3
2011	Amateur Ninja	Adult Swim	Web
2011	Thundercats: Tree of the Ancients	Warner Bros.	Web
2012	Robot Unicorn Attack: Evolution	Adult Swim	Facebook
2012	Amateur Surgeon Hospital	Adult Swim	Facebook
2012	Superbia	Disney	Web
2013	Moshi Monsters: Lost Islands	GREE	iOS
2013	Qwirkle	Square Enix	iOS, Android, Facebook
2013	Foul Play	Devolver Digital	Xbox Live Arcade, Steam, PlayStation 4, PlayStation Vita
2013	Amateur Surgeon 3: Tag Team Trauma	Adult Swim	iOS, Android
2014	Delivery Outlaw	Adult Swim	iOS
2014	Secrets and Treasure	Microsoft Studios	Windows 8
2014	Hatoful Boyfriend	Devolver Digital	Microsoft Windows, OS X, Linux, PlayStation 4, PlayStation Vita
2015	Heavenstrike Rivals	Square Enix	Android, iOS, Microsoft Windows
2015	Hatoful Boyfriend: Holiday Star	Devolver Digital	Microsoft Windows, OS X, Linux, PlayStation 4, PlayStation Vita
2016	Bounty Stars	DeNA West	Android, iOS
2016	Fantastic Beasts: Cases from the Wizarding World	WB Games	Android, iOS
2017	New Yahtzee with Buddies	Scopely	Android, iOS
2018	Fable Fortune	Microsoft Studios	Microsoft Windows, Xbox One
2019	Gears Pop!	Xbox Game Studios	Android, iOS
2020	Murder by Numbers	The Irregular Corporation	Nintendo Switch, Microsoft Windows
2020	Fall Guys	Devolver Digital, Epic Games	Microsoft Windows, Nintendo Switch, PlayStation 4, PlayStation 5, Xbox One, Xbox Series X/S
