= Botanica (series) =

Botanica(series)
- Official logo of Botanica: Earthbound
- Genre: Casual games(Hidden Object Puzzle Adventure Game)
- Developer: Boomzap Entertainment
- Publisher: Big Fish Games
- Platforms: Microsoft Windows, Mac OS X, iPhone, iPad
- First release: Botanica: Into the Unknown; October 22, 2012
- Latest release: Botanica: Earthbound; December 14, 2013

Botanica is a series of casual hidden object puzzle adventure games that are a combination of fantasy and science fiction. It was developed by Boomzap Entertainment and published exclusively by Big Fish Games. The games are available on PC and Mac platforms, with iPhone and iPad versions released for the first title.

Botanica: Into the Unknown was the first game to be released on October 22, 2012. The sequel entitled Botanica: Earthbound was launched on December 14, 2013.

== Premise ==
Dr. Ellie Wright is a botanist stranded on a strange planet called Botanica, which is full of exotic creatures and locations. She meets different characters who have also crash landed on Botanica and together they are looking for a way back to Earth.

== Games ==
=== Botanica: Into the Unknown ===
Botanica: Into the Unknown was released on Big Fish Games on October 22, 2012. In this hidden object game, botanist Dr. Ellie Wright explores an exotic planet filled with strange creatures. Players must solve minigames and puzzles in order to survive. A reviewer described its theme as a mix of fantasy and science fiction and also added that Botanica is "fantastic in almost every aspects from the visuals, audio to the gameplay".

On June 24, 2013, versions for the iPhone and iPad were released simultaneously.

Gamezebo rated Botanica: Into the Unknown 4 out of 5 stars as it gives users "a seamless experience in genre-blending, embedding features of point-and-click adventure". Jay Is Games points out that there is "high quality in all areas, from an intuitive user interface to eye-pleasing aesthetics to a detail-oriented and engaging story".

=== Botanica: Earthbound ===
Botanica: Earthbound Collector's Edition is the second game in the series released exclusively on Big Fish Games on December 14, 2013. Users can play as two characters, Dr. Ellie Wright and Ian Garrett, as they try to find their way back to Earth.

AllAboutCasualGame.com calls it an "astounding HOPA adventure set in a beautiful world with vivid creativity and superbly enjoyable gameplay". It earned a rating of 4.5 out of 5 stars on this review. CasualGameGuides also added that "the graphics are superb, the storyline is intriguing, and the gameplay itself was challenging and interesting".

A Standard Edition for Botanica: Earthbound was released on January 12, 2014, by Big Fish Games for PC and Mac platforms.
