= Antique Road Trip =

- Genres: Hidden object, adventure
- Developer: Boomzap Entertainment
- Publisher: Big Fish Games
- Platforms: Windows, Mac OS X, iPhone, iPad, Android
- First release: Antique Road Trip: USA; May 30, 2010
- Latest release: Antique Road Trip: American Dreamin'; September 25, 2013

Antique Road Trip is a hidden object puzzle adventure game series developed by Boomzap Entertainment and published by Big Fish Games. It is available on Microsoft Windows, Mac, iPhone, iPad and Android platforms.

As of 2013, three Antique Road Trip games have been released. Unlike the first two games in the franchise, the latest installment Antique Road Trip: American Dreamin is free-to-play.

== Plot ==
Main characters Grace and James Anderson are newlyweds travelling across America in search for hard-to-find antiques for their business. They visit cities such as Cheyenne, Memphis, Austin, Montana, Wisconsin and Louisiana to find various treasures. In the sequel, their newborn son, Colin, and a cute little puppy join them in their adventures.

These two antiques experts return for a third game not as main characters, but to help the player rebuild a local antique shop.

== Games ==
=== Antique Road Trip: USA ===
Antique Road Trip: USA was released as an exclusive game on Big Fish Games on May 30, 2010 where it quickly rose to #5 on the all formats chart. Antique Road Trip is a game in the Hidden Object genre containing different types of mini-games. Gamezebo gave a score of 3.5 out of 5 stars to the game, saying "Still, Antique Road Trip is a solid game, if not an especially profound or memorable one." Antique Road Trip: USA was released as an app with Free and Full versions on the iOS for both the iPhone and iPad in the months of June and July in 2011. Meanwhile, Android versions for Google Play and Amazon App Store were released in 2013.

=== Antique Road Trip 2: Homecoming ===
Antique Road Trip 2: Homecoming was released on Big Fish Games on April 19, 2011 as a sequel to Antique Road Trip USA. Similar to the prequel, it is a hidden object game with different mini-games. It received positive reviews from various game sites like iWin, Gamezebo and Big Fish Games where the customizable hint-giving puppy was pointed out as a "cute and welcome addition to the game." Android versions for Google Play and Amazon App Store were released in 2014.

=== Antique Road Trip: American Dreamin' ===
Antique Road Trip: American Dreamin' is the third game in the franchise and was released on Big Fish Games on September 25, 2013. Like the first two games, the gameplay consists of hidden object scenes and mini-games. However, this is the first in the series, and of all the games developed by Boomzap, to be offered in the free-to-play format. It also includes a town-building feature. In an interview with Boomzap developers, it can be played as a stand-alone since the players create their own story. It also has a social gaming component wherein interaction with other real live players is also available.

Big Fish Games and Boomzap Entertainment also released an update that featured a Thanksgiving event starting November 15, 2013. Autumn-themed decorations and items were added to the game, including new quests and a pilgrim character.

Another update was released on December 10, 2013 which added new Christmas hidden object scenes, all-around Winter theme and daily holiday quests. Boomzap and Big Fish Games continue to release updates with themed events such as Valentines. It features a love story between two female characters. According to a review, it is "highly enjoyable and visually appealing" and "family-friendly".

Antique Road Trip: American Dreamin was also released on iTunes for the iPad on June 11, 2014.
