= 16th Annual D.I.C.E. Awards =

Video game award ceremony

- Date: February 7, 2013
- Venue: Red Rock Casino, Resort & Spa
- Country: Las Vegas, Nevada, USA
- Hosted by: Chris Hardwick

Highlights
- Most awards: Journey (8)
- Most nominations: Journey (11)
- Game of the Year: Journey
- Hall of Fame: Gabe Newell
- Pioneer: Marc Blank & Dave Lebling

The 16th Annual D.I.C.E. Awards was the 16th edition of the D.I.C.E. Awards, an annual awards event that honored the best games in the video game industry during 2012. The awards were arranged by the Academy of Interactive Arts & Sciences (AIAS), and were held at the Red Rock Casino, Resort & Spa in Las Vegas, Nevada on February 7, 2013. It was also held as part of the academy's 2013 D.I.C.E. Summit, and was hosted by stand-up comedian Chris Hardwick.

The award for "Web Based Game of the Year" was offered as a "Game of the Year" award. The "Social Networking Game of the Year" award would no longer be offered.

Journey received the most nominations and won the most awards, including "Game of the Year". Sony Computer Entertainment was the most nominated and award-winning publisher, with Thatgamecompany as the top developer. Microsoft Studios had the most nominated games and Electronic Arts had the most award-winning games.

Gabe Newell, founder of Valve Corporation and lead developer of the digital storefront Steam, was inducted into the Academy of Interactive Arts & Sciences Hall of Fame. Infocom co-founders Marc Blank and Dave Lebling both received the "Pioneer Award".

== Winners and Nominees ==
Winners are listed first, highlighted in boldface, and indicated with a double dagger (‡).

=== Game of the Year awards ===
**Game of the Year**: **Journey** — **Thatgamecompany**, **Sony Computer Entertainment**‡; Borderlands 2 — Gearbox Software, 2K Games; Far Cry 3 — Ubisoft Montreal; The Walking Dead — Telltale Games; XCOM: Enemy Unknown — Firaxis Games, 2K Games	**Downloadable Game of the Year**: **The Walking Dead** — **Telltale Games**‡; Fez — Polytron Corporation, Microsoft Studios; Journey — Thatgamecompany, Sony Computer Entertainment; Mark of the Ninja — Klei Entertainment, Microsoft Studios; The Unfinished Swan — Giant Sparrow, SCE Santa Monica Studio
**Handheld Game of the Year**: **Paper Mario: Sticker Star** — **Intelligent Systems**, **Nintendo**‡; Gravity Rush — SCE Japan Studio; Resident Evil: Revelations — Capcom; Sound Shapes — Queasy Games, Sony Computer Entertainment; Uncharted: Golden Abyss — SCE Bend Studio	**Mobile Game of the Year**: **Hero Academy** — **Robot Entertainment**‡; Fairway Solitaire — Big Fish Studios; Horn — Phosphor Studios, Zynga; Rayman Jungle Run — Ubisoft Montpellier, Pastagames
**Web Based Game of the Year**: **SimCity Social** — **Playfish**, **Electronic Arts**‡; Bingo Bash — Bash Gaming; Burrito Bison Revenge — Juicy Beast Studio, Adult Swim Games; CityVille 2 — Zynga; SongPop — FreshPlanet, Gameloft	**Outstanding Innovation in Gaming**: **Journey** — **Thatgamecompany**, **Sony Computer Entertainment**‡; Nintendo Land — Nintendo EAD; Sound Shapes — Queasy Games, Sony Computer Entertainment; The Unfinished Swan — Giant Sparrow, SCE Santa Monica Studio; The Walking Dead — Telltale Games

=== Craft awards ===
**Outstanding Achievement in Game Direction**: **Journey** — **Thatgamecompany**, **Sony Computer Entertainment**‡; Dishonored — Arkane Studios, Bethesda Softworks; Far Cry 3 — Ubisoft Montreal; The Unfinished Swan — Giant Sparrow, SCE Santa Monica Studio; The Walking Dead — Telltale Games
**Outstanding Achievement in Animation**: **Assassin's Creed III** — **Ubisoft Montreal**‡; Far Cry 3 — Ubisoft Montreal; Hitman: Absolution — IO Interactive, Square Enix Europe; Mark of the Ninja — Klei Entertainment, Microsoft Studios; Uncharted: Golden Abyss — SCE Bend Studio	**Outstanding Achievement in Art Direction**: **Journey** — **Thatgamecompany**, **Sony Computer Entertainment**‡; Borderlands 2 — Gearbox Software, 2K Games; Dishonored — Arkane Studios, Bethesda Softworks; Far Cry 3 — Ubisoft Montreal; Halo 4 — 343 Industries, Microsoft Studios
**Outstanding Character Performance - Male or Female**: **Lee Everett** **(The Walking Dead)** — **Telltale Games**‡; Tiny Tina (Borderlands 2) — Gearbox Software, 2K Games; Vaas Montenegro (Far Cry 3) — Ubisoft Montreal; Cortana (Halo 4) — 343 Industries, Microsoft Studios; Female Commander Shepard (Mass Effect 3) — BioWare, Electronic Arts	**Outstanding Achievement in Connectivity**: **Halo 4** — **343 Industries**, **Microsoft Studios**‡; Call of Duty: Black Ops II — Treyarch, Activision; Nike+ Kinect Training — Sumo Digital, Microsoft Studios
**Outstanding Achievement in Gameplay Engineering**: **XCOM: Enemy Unknown** — **Firaxis Games**, **2K Games**‡; Dishonored — Arkane Studios, Bethesda Softworks; Gravity Rush — SCE Japan Studio; Journey — Thatgamecompany, Sony Computer Entertainment; The Walking Dead — Telltale Games	**Outstanding Achievement in Online Gameplay**: **Journey** — **Thatgamecompany**, **Sony Computer Entertainment**‡; Borderlands 2 — Gearbox Software, 2K Games; Call of Duty: Black Ops II — Treyarch, Activision; Diablo III — Blizzard Entertainment; Halo 4 — 343 Industries, Microsoft Studios
**Outstanding Achievement in Original Music Composition**: **Journey** — **Thatgamecompany**, **Sony Computer Entertainment**‡; Diablo III — Blizzard Entertainment; Far Cry 3 — Ubisoft Montreal; Mass Effect 3 — BioWare, Electronic Arts; World of Warcraft: Mists of Pandaria — Blizzard Entertainment	**Outstanding Achievement in Sound Design**: **Journey** — **Thatgamecompany**, **Sony Computer Entertainment**‡; Assassin's Creed III — Ubisoft Montreal; Diablo III — Blizzard Entertainment; Medal of Honor: Warfighter — Danger Close Games, Electronic Arts; Syndicate — Starbreeze Studios, Electronic Arts
**Outstanding Achievement in Story**: **The Walking Dead** — **Telltale Games**‡; Dishonored — Arkane Studios, Bethesda Softworks; Journey — Thatgamecompany, Sony Computer Entertainment; Sleeping Dogs — United Front Games, Square Enix Europe; Spec Ops: The Line — Yager Development, 2K Games	**Outstanding Achievement in Visual Engineering**: **Halo 4** — **343 Industries**, **Microsoft Studios**‡; Call of Duty: Black Ops II — Treyarch, Activision; Hitman: Absolution — IO Interactive, Square Enix Europe; Need for Speed: Most Wanted — Criterion Games, Electronic Arts; Total War: Shogun 2: Fall of the Samurai — Creative Assembly, Sega

=== Genre awards ===
**Action Game of the Year**: **Borderlands 2** — **Gearbox Software**, **2K Games**‡; Far Cry 3 — Ubisoft Montreal; Halo 4 — 343 Industries, Microsoft Studios; Hitman: Absolution — IO Interactive, Square Enix Europe; Sleeping Dogs — United Front Games, Square Enix Europe	**Adventure Game of the Year**: **The Walking Dead** — **Telltale Games**‡; Assassin's Creed III — Ubisoft Montreal; Darksiders II — Vigil Games, THQ; Dishonored — Arkane Studios, Bethesda Softworks; New Super Mario Bros. U — Nintendo EAD
**Casual Game of the Year**: **Journey** — **Thatgamecompany**, **Sony Computer Entertainment**‡; Fairway Solitaire — Big Fish Studios; Puzzle Craft — Ars Thanea, Electronic Arts; Rayman Jungle Run — Ubisoft Montpellier, Pastagames; Sound Shapes — Queasy Games, Sony Computer Entertainment	**Family Game of the Year**: **Skylanders: Giants** — **Toys for Bob**, **Activision**‡; Dance Central 3 — Harmonix, Microsoft Studios; Just Dance 4 — Ubisoft Milan/Paris/Reflections/Bucharest/Pune; Lego Batman 2: DC Super Heroes — Traveller's Tales, Warner Bros. Interactive Entertainment; Nintendo Land — Nintendo EAD
**Fighting Game of the Year**: **PlayStation All-Stars Battle Royale** — **SuperBot Entertainment**, **Sony Computer Entertainment**‡; Persona 4 Arena — Arc System Works, Atlus; Soulcalibur V — Project Soul, Namco Bandai Games; Street Fighter X Tekken — Capcom; Tekken Tag Tournament 2 — Namco Bandai Games	**Racing Game of the Year**: **Need for Speed: Most Wanted** — **Criterion Games**, **Electronic Arts**‡; Forza Horizon — Playground Games, Microsoft Studios; LittleBigPlanet Karting — United Front Games, SCE San Diego Studio; MotorStorm: RC — Evolution Studios, Sony Computer Entertainment; Trials Evolution — RedLynx, Microsoft Studios
**Role-Playing/Massively Multiplayer Game of the Year**: **Mass Effect 3** — **BioWare**, **Electronic Arts**‡; Diablo III — Blizzard Entertainment; Dust: An Elysian Tail — Humble Hearts, Microsoft Studios; Guild Wars 2 — ArenaNet, NCSoft; Torchlight II — Runic Games	**Sports Game of the Year**: **FIFA 13** — **EA Canada**‡; MLB 12: The Show — SCE San Diego; NBA 2K13 — Visual Concepts, 2K Games
**Strategy/Simulation Game of the Year**: **XCOM: Enemy Unknown** — **Firaxis Games**, **2K Games**‡; FTL: Faster Than Light — Subset Games; Minecraft: 360 Edition — Mojang Studios, 4J Studios, Microsoft Studios; Orcs Must Die! 2 — Robot Entertainment, Microsoft Studios; Total War: Shogun 2: Fall of the Samurai — Creative Assembly, Sega

=== Special awards ===
==== Hall of Fame ====
- Gabe Newell

==== Pioneer ====
- Marc Blank
- Dave Lebling

=== Multiple nominations and awards ===
==== Multiple Nominations ====
Games that received multiple nominations
Nominations	Game
11	Journey
8	The Walking Dead
7	Far Cry 3
6	Halo 4
5	Borderlands 2
5	Dishonored
4	Diablo III
3	Assassin's Creed III
3	Call of Duty: Black Ops II
3	Hitman: Absolution
3	Mass Effect 3
3	Sound Shapes
3	The Unfinished Swan
3	XCOM: Enemy Unknown
2	Fairway Solitaire
2	Gravity Rush
2	Mark of the Ninja
2	Need for Speed: Most Wanted
2	Nintendo Land
2	Rayman Jungle Run
2	Sleeping Dogs
2	Total War: Shogun 2: Fall of the Samurai
2	Uncharted: Golden Abyss

Nominations by company
Nominations	Games	Company
25	9	Sony Computer Entertainment
16	10	Microsoft Studios
13	4	Ubisoft
11	1	Thatgamecompany
10	7	Electronic Arts
10	4	2K Games
8	1	Telltale Games
6	1	343 Industries
5	2	Square Enix Europe
5	1	Arkane Studios
5	1	Bethesda Softworks
5	1	Blizzard Entertainment
5	1	Gearbox Software
4	3	Nintendo
4	2	Activision
3	2	Firaxis Games
3	2	United Front Games
3	1	BioWare
3	1	Giant Sparrow
3	1	IO Interactive
3	1	Queasy Games
3	1	Treyarch
2	2	Capcom
2	2	Namco Bandai Games
2	2	Robot Entertainment
2	2	Zynga
2	1	Big Fish Studios
2	1	Creative Assembly
2	1	Criterion Games
2	1	Klei Entertainment
2	1	Pastagames
2	1	Sega

==== Multiple awards ====
Games that received multiple awards
Awards	Game
8	Journey
4	The Walking Dead
2	Halo 4
2	XCOM: Enemy Unknown

Awards by company
Awards	Games	Company
9	2	Sony Computer Entertainment
8	1	Thatgamecompany
4	4	Electronic Arts
4	1	Telltale Games
3	2	2K Games
2	1	Microsoft Studios
2	1	343 Industries
2	1	Firaxis Games
