= Flux Family Secrets: The Rabbit Hole =

2010 video game

- Developer: Skunk Studios
- Publisher: Big Fish Games
- Composer: Clean Cuts
- Engine: TGB
- Platform: Windows / Mac OS X
- Release: NA: July 4, 2010 (Standard Edition); NA: June 11, 2010 (Collector's Edition)
- Genre: Puzzle
- Mode: Single-player

Flux Family Secrets: The Rabbit Hole is a hidden object puzzle-adventure (HOPA) casual game developed by Skunk Studios, and distributed by Big Fish Games. It is the second instalment in the Flux Family Secrets series. The game is available at Skunk Studios and Big Fish Games website.

== Story ==
Flux Family Secrets: The Rabbit Hole leads players through the Flux mansion thirty years in the past. The main character, Jesse, finds herself stuck in the past face to face with her 6-year-old self. With her help, she must fix the mechanism that enables time travel called the Apollo. In order to do this, she must travel to historical events that have been altered by the missing pieces. Along the way the player learns about other members of the family, new historical characters and a greater plan that's in the works. The player tries to fix a historical event only to find it slightly changed later. They must continue to correct the event at different stages before finding the piece of the Apollo. Once all the pieces of the Apollo are collect, only then can Jesse return to her present. Or does she?

== Historical characters ==
Throughout the journey, the player travels to different locations in time that impacted three historical events; The Gettysburg Address; Henry Ford's test drive of the Quadricycle; and the Boston Tea Party which includes the Green Dragon Tavern, Griffin's Wharf and the tea ship named the Beaver. There, the player finds the missing Apollo components by fixing these historical events with the help of Abraham Lincoln, Henry Ford and Paul Revere.

== Gameplay ==
There are twelve chapters, each containing three or more navigation scenes. The player must navigate through a variety of scenes solving puzzles to enable them to proceed further into the game. A problem is presented early and the player must find a way of solving it by finding and replacing disassembled objects. There are a variety of story pages scattered throughout the game that provide information about the family and the historical events and characters. The player travels back in time to set right events that helped shape the modern world.

Unlike its predecessor, this game includes a large number of the popular hidden object scenes throughout the navigation environments. Clicking these launches a close-up shot of the environment crowded with a list of 12 items to find. Once the list is completed the player earns of the items to use in solving a puzzle or mini game.

== Collector's edition ==
Flux Family Secrets: The Rabbit Hole was released on July 4, 2010, however a "Collector's Edition" was launched on June 11, 2010, exclusively for Big Fish Game Club members. The Collector's Edition includes additional gameplay, levels and achievements; an integrated strategy guide; music tracks; and behind the scenes artwork. Whilst collector's editions are now common amongst "casual" PC games, The Rabbit Hole is the first such example done in true high definition.
