= Dana Knightstone =

- Genres: Casual, hidden object, puzzle, adventure
- Developer: Boomzap Entertainment
- Publisher: Big Fish Games
- Platforms: Microsoft Windows, Mac OS X, iPhone, iPad
- First release: Death at Fairing Point: A Dana Knightstone Novel; December 31, 2010
- Latest release: Death and Betrayal in Romania: A Dana Knightstone Novel; August 30, 2014

Dana Knightstone is a series of casual hidden object puzzle adventure games with a mystery novel storyline. It was developed by Boomzap Entertainment and published by Big Fish Games. It is available on PC, Mac, iPhone and iPad platforms. The franchise draws its title from the main character, Dana Knightstone, a fiction novelist.

The first Dana Knightstone novel was released on December 31, 2010. To date, five games in the series have been released. The latest installment Death and Betrayal in Romania was released on August 30, 2014.

== Plot ==
Dana Knightstone is an up-and-coming fiction writer. The series begins when she comes across a murder mystery while on vacation in Scotland. Her ability to see ghosts guides her in searching for clues and solving puzzles. As she becomes a best-selling novelist, she continues to travel around Europe including Italy and Austria, where she encounters more spirits and mysteries to unveil. She discovers new abilities during her adventure in Portugal.

== Games ==
=== Death at Fairing Point: A Dana Knightstone Novel ===
Death at Fairing Point: A Dana Knightstone Novel is a game in the hidden object/adventure genre that plays like a mystery novel. The main character is Dana Knightstone, a fiction writer who uncovers a mystery while on vacation in Scotland.

Death at Fairing Point: A Dana Knightstone Novel (Collector's Edition) was released exclusively on Big Fish Games on December 31, 2010. It peaked at #1 on all the PC charts and lasted 34 days. It was also the first game by Boomzap Entertainment to be featured as a Collector's Edition. The Standard Edition was released on February 7, 2011. It peaked at #6 and lasted in the top 10 for 14 days. The iPad, iPod Touch and iPhone ports were released simultaneously by Big Fish Games on August 25, 2011.

The game received good reviews, with Gamezebo giving it a 3.5/5 rating, saying that it "isn't a revolution but it is still a very good hidden object adventure that's especially enjoyable for gamers with a taste for romance." Jay Is Games wrote that "for players who aren't looking for a real brain twister and just want something to enjoy, Death at Fairing Point easily exceeds expectations."

=== Death Under Tuscan Skies: A Dana Knightstone Novel ===
Death Under Tuscan Skies: A Dana Knightstone Novel is the second game in the Dana Knightstone series and like its predecessor it is a hidden object/adventure game. In this sequel, Dana Knightstone heads off to Tuscany to give a lecture, only to discover another case of a murder mystery.

The Collector's Edition was released exclusively on Big Fish Games on November 11, 2011. It peaked at #4 on the Big Fish Games' Top 100 PC Chart and lasted 8 days in the Top 10. The Standard Edition was released on December 12, 2011. The iPad, iPod Touch and iPhone ports were released simultaneously by Big Fish Games on October 4, 2012.

The game received better reviews than the prequel, with Gamezebo giving it a 4/5 star rating and Jay Is Games saying, "What makes it stand out is the fact that it is packed front to back with a wide variety of games and puzzles ranging from easy to head-bangingly difficult, with the hidden object scenes almost an afterthought."

=== Death Upon an Austrian Sonata: A Dana Knightstone Novel ===
Death Upon an Austrian Sonata: A Dana Knightstone Novel is the third game in the Dana Knightstone series and was released on December 7, 2012. A new adventure brings Dana Knightstone to Austria where she investigates a ghost seen by her cousin, Sebastian Knightstone. On February 14, 2014, Boomzap released Death Upon an Austrian Sonata: A Dana Knightstone Novel for iPad and iPhone/iPod Touch.

This sequel did not disappoint as a visual investigation game and brought Boomzap more positive reviews. According to Gamezebo, it is "another great addition to developer Boomzap’s library, offering up a gorgeous landscape to explore, excellently executed music and sound, and a wide range of puzzles and mysteries to solve." Jay Is Games says that it is "worth your recognition and favor".

=== Death at Cape Porto: A Dana Knightstone Novel ===
Official logo of Death at Cape Porto: A Dana Knightstone Novel

Death at Cape Porto: A Dana Knightstone Novel is the fourth game in the series. It was released as a Collector's Edition on December 1, 2013 on Big Fish Games while the Standard Edition followed on December 30, 2013. It still follows the mystery novel storyline, with the main protagonist Dana Knightstone discovering new abilities in interacting with ghosts, and is set in Portugal.

Death at Cape Porto: A Dana Knightstone Novel received a rating of 4 out of 5 stars from AllAboutCasualGame.com. According to the reviewer, it was "very beautiful, very entertaining but unfortunately, very short" and the overall atmosphere of the game was "very romantic supported by lovely composed background music".

=== Death and Betrayal in Romania: A Dana Knightstone Novel ===
Official logo of Death at Cape Porto: A Dana Knightstone Novel

Death and Betrayal in Romania: A Dana Knightstone Novel is the fifth game in the series wherein Dana is captured by a ghost to make her his bride, thinking that it was his murdered wife-to-be, but later in the game he does come to realize that he was wrong. The Collector's Edition was released on August 30, 2014 on Big Fish Games, followed by the Standard Edition on September 28, 2014. A mobile version for iPhone and iPad devices was also launched on April 2, 2015.

Death and Betrayal in Romania: A Dana Knightstone Novel received mixed reviews. According to Jay Is Games, "the scenery is easy on the eyes and the music is lush," also adding that "the characters and the storyline are delightfully over the top." However, AllAboutCasualGame.com rated it only 3.5 out of 5 stars.
