= Goblin Kingdom =

Goblin Kingdom may refer to:

- Goblin Kingdom, fictional kingdom in the "Hot to the Touch" episode of Adventure Time
- Goblin Kingdom, fictional kingdom in the Return to Labyrinth manga
- Awakening: The Goblin Kingdom, video game of the Awakening video game series
- Nachtur, the Goblin Kingdom, fictional kingdom in the Dungeons & Dragons roleplaying game

== See also ==
- List of fictional countries
