= Horn (video game) =

2012 video game

- Developer: Phosphor Studios
- Publisher: Zynga
- Engine: Unreal Engine 3
- Platforms: iOS, Android
- Release: August 16, 2012

Horn is an iOS and Android game by American developer Phosphor Studios and published by Zynga on August 16, 2012.

== Gameplay and plot ==
The game's plot and gameplay were, according to Gamezebo, inspired by Zelda, Infinity Blade, and Fable.

== Critical reception ==
Reception

Aggregate score
Aggregator	Score
Metacritic	86/100

Review scores
Publication	Score
Destructoid	6/10
Gamezebo	5/5
IGN	9/10
Pocket Gamer	4/5

The game has a Metacritic score of 86 based on 19 critic reviews. IGN's Justin Davis praised the game "as an impressive example of what can be accomplished when a talented team takes full advantage of modern mobile devices". Gamezebo described it as "what Ico would look like if Peter Molyneux made it (after an all night Infinity Blade/Zelda binge)", "a beautiful mobile adventure that no gamer should be without", and a "mobile masterpiece".

Several reviewers commented on difficulties with the games exploration controls. James Stephanie Sterling writing that "[...] touching the ground in a fully 3D world is about as clumsy as you might expect. Between Horn not responding to input, getting stuck on corners, and running further along a path than intended, controlling the hero feels crude and awkward." Pocket Gamer found that the controls "takes a while to get used to, and it hasn't been executed flawlessly". Davis disagreed stating "Horn's intuitive touch-powered controls make exploring the game world a simple pleasure."

The games environmental puzzles did not impress critics. Jim Squires described them as "fairly basic", Justin Davis with "puzzles can be solved in just a couple steps, even late in the game", and Sterling writing "The 'puzzles' blocking Horn's way aren't puzzles at all." Jon Mundy calls the puzzles "occasionally repetitive".

Combat is where critics agree the game shine. "It's satisfying to learn an enemy's patterns, escape their blows, and smash them to pieces, though the enemy attacks can be so varied that it's often hard to work out a pattern before it's never seen again." writes Sterling for Destructoid. IGN also praises the enemies varied attack patterns. Gamezebo highlights the game's Infinity Blade and The Legend of Zelda: Ocarina of Time influences writing "As far as mobile action games go, Horn has taken the high bar set by Infinity Blade and raised it even higher."

The quality of the story surprised critics. Mundy mentions that "Horn's universe draws from a wider range of sources than your run-of-the-mill Tolkien love-in." and Sterling spotlights to how "Horn continues to demonstrate that iOS/Android games needn't just be physics puzzles and thoughtless distractions." Sterling continues by calling it "a huge step up from almost any other mobile game" and that it "even manages to be more engaging than a lot of big-budget console narratives these days."

=== Accolades ===
During the 16th Annual D.I.C.E. Awards, the Academy of Interactive Arts & Sciences nominated Horn for "Mobile Game of the Year".
