= Pirates Plund-Arrr =

2010 video game

- Developer: Boomzap Entertainment
- Publisher: Majesco
- Platform: Wii
- Release: NA: May 25, 2010
- Genres: Beat 'em up, RPG, Action
- Modes: Single-player, Multiplayer

Pirates Plund-Arrr (or Pirates Plundarrr) is a side-scrolling beat 'em up released exclusively for the Wii. It was developed by Boomzap Entertainment and published by Majesco. It was released in North America on May 25, 2010.

== Gameplay ==
Pirates-Plund-Arrr is a side-scrolling beat-em-up that incorporates a small number of role-playing video game elements. After selecting a character, the player then selects a starting stage through an overworld map. After completing a stage, the player has the choice to revisit it or to move to another stage. The map also displays shops where the player character can buy items and weaponry using coins gained from defeated foes. Arena stages can be unlocked where the player character can take on challenges to unlock additional characters.

Characters gain experience points by damaging foes which allow the character to level up. Each level gained allows the player to allocate points towards the character's four basic combat attributes. Certain level advances also grant new combination attacks. Progress is tracked for each of the playable characters separately. The character's magic level is also tracked by a meter and regenerates over time. Numerous weapons can be found in the game, each that have various effects to the character's attributes when equipped. The player can find animal companions for their character that may assist in battle, improve the character's attributes, or provide another special ability such as increased treasure earned from defeated foes.

== Reception ==
Nintendo Power's Steve Thomason gave it a 4.0/10, criticizing its presentation and difficulty saying, "This [four-player brawler] lacks any sort of interesting hook, suffers from horrendous frame-rate issues, and sports some of the blandest backgrounds imaginable... You'll breeze through one level unscathed, then feel like you hit a brick wall the next".

== See also ==
- Castle Crashers
