= Foul Play (video game) =

2013 video game

- Developer: Mediatonic
- Publisher: Devolver Digital
- Platforms: Windows, Mac OS X, Linux, Xbox 360, PlayStation 4, PlayStation Vita
- Release: Windows, Xbox 360; 18 September 2013; OS X, Linux; 28 October 2013; PlayStation 4,PlayStation Vita; 23 February 2016
- Genres: Beat 'em up, action-adventure
- Modes: Single-player, multiplayer

Foul Play is a 2013 brawler action-adventure developed by UK-based indie studio Mediatonic and published by Devolver Digital. It was released for Microsoft Windows and Xbox 360 on 18 September 2013 and for Mac OS X and Linux on 28 October 2013. After a port to PlayStation 4 and PlayStation Vita was announced in mid-2014, the PlayStation 4 received its early version of the game on 1 September 2015 in North America as part of the PlayStation Heroes charity campaign, while both the PlayStation 4 and PlayStation Vita versions were actually released on 23 February 2016.

== Gameplay ==
Foul Play is a side-scrolling co-op brawler set on-stage in a theatre in front of the theatre's crowd. The player may perform shattering takedowns and reversals to amuse the audience and perform devastating linked attacks.

== Plot ==
In Foul Play the player follows the daemon-hunter Baron Dashforth and his sidekick Scampwick, performing on-stage in a theatre where something has gone wrong and he must discover the origin of the foul play.

== Reception ==
Reception

Aggregate score
Aggregator	Score
Metacritic	(PC, X360) 69/100 (PS4) 66/100 (Vita) 62/100

Review scores
Publication	Score
4Players	(PC, X360) 70%
Destructoid	(PC) 5.5/10
Eurogamer	(X360) 5/10
GameRevolution	(X360) 8/10
GameSpot	(X360) 6/10
IGN	(PC, X360) 8.1/10
Joystiq	(X360) 4/5
Official Xbox Magazine (US)	(X360) 6.5/10
PCGamesN	(PC) 6/10
Polygon	(X360) 7.5/10

The game received "mixed or average reviews" on all platforms, according to the review aggregation website Metacritic. IGN said that the game "stages one of the most imaginative brawlers around, with bonus points for style in more ways than one." GameSpot praised the Xbox 360 version's art style and plot, but criticised its repetitive nature.
