= 1000 Tiny Claws =

2011 video game

- Developer: Mediatonic
- Publisher: Mediatonic
- Platform: PlayStation Portable
- Release: NA: October 4, 2011; EU: October 5, 2011
- Genre: Action
- Mode: Single-player

1000 Tiny Claws is an action game developed and published by Mediatonic for PlayStation Portable in 2011. In the game, the player controls a pirate, tasked with using a sword to knock insects off of a hovering island.

== Gameplay ==
The player takes control of Rana, the first mate of sky pirate Captain Bluebell, who has removed a magical sword and accidentally released a curse plaguing the world with insects. With Captain Bluebell and his crew arrested and sentenced to hang, Rana has only 24 hours to remove the curse by returning the pilfered sword to its rightful place.

The game consists of five regions each made up of five hovering islands, with the player being tasked with fighting off insect swarms that will attempt to knock them off the island. When the player hits an enemy, they get knocked back; the more the enemies get hit, the further they fly, until they get knocked off the island. If the player gets hit, they will get knocked further with each consecutive hit. When a bug is knocked off, an apple may spawn, which will restore the player's defense, making it harder for the insects to push them off the island. If the player is knocked off, the game is over and they are given an option to try again.

== Reception ==
Reception

Aggregate score
Aggregator	Score
Metacritic	76/100

Review scores
Publication	Score
GamesMaster	70%
PlayStation Official Magazine – UK	4/10
Pocket Gamer	3.5/5
PSM3	91%
Push Square	7/10

The game received "generally favorable reviews" according to the review aggregation website Metacritic. Pocket Gamer said of the game, "It's a pity that the quality of swordplay at higher levels doesn't quite match up to the polished piratical trimmings of this snappily designed little number, leaving a considerable - but never quite deal-breaking - blemish on an otherwise charming downloadable fighter." Push Square said that the game "doesn't quite live up to the pedigree of Mediatonic's previous PlayStation Minis, with the quality of the swordplay in the game's concluding third detracting from the experience. But issues aside, this is still a delightfully conceived piratical package with a great sense of humour, and thus entirely worthy of your time." However, PlayStation Official Magazine – UK said, "Sometimes you'll want to hit yourself hard in the head with your controller, just to break up the monotony."
