= Monsters (Probably) Stole My Princess =

2010 video game

- Developer: Mediatonic
- Publisher: Mediatonic
- Platforms: PlayStation Portable, Xbox 360
- Release: PSP; April 22, 2010; Xbox 360; August 24, 2010
- Genre: Platform game
- Mode: Single-player

Monsters (Probably) Stole My Princess is a platform game developed and published by Mediatonic for PlayStation Portable and Xbox 360 in 2010.

== Reception ==
Reception

Aggregate scores
Aggregator	Score
GameRankings	(X360) 80% (PSP) 72%
Metacritic	(PSP) 72/100

Review scores
Publication	Score
Destructoid	(X360) 9/10
Eurogamer	(PSP) 8/10
GamesMaster	(PSP) 43%
GamesTM	(PSP) 8/10
IGN	(PSP) 8.8/10
PlayStation Official Magazine – UK	(PSP) 8/10
Pocket Gamer	(PSP) 3/5
PSM3	(PSP) 79%
Push Square	(PSP) 9/10

The PSP version received "mixed or average reviews" according to the review aggregation website Metacritic.
