= Fairway Solitaire =

- Developers: Big Fish Studios; Babaroga (Windows Phone)
- Publisher: Big Fish Games
- Designer: John Cutter
- Engine: Java
- Platforms: Windows, MacOS, iOS, Android, Windows Phone
- Release: 2007; February 15, 2012 (iOS); 2013 (Windows Phone)
- Genre: Card (Solitaire)
- Mode: Single player

Fairway Solitaire, alternatively titled Fairway is a casual video game based on the classic card game solitaire and developed by Big Fish Studios. The game is digitally distributed and is available from Big Fish Games.

== Gameplay ==
Fairway Solitaire presents players with a modified type of solitaire with a golf theme. In the game, players use golf clubs and playing cards to clear the table. The goal in Fairway Solitaire is to play through a collection of 70 courses with each course offering a different type of challenge. Once the challenge is met, the next course is unlocked and the player advances in the tournament. Players may be awarded trophies for accomplishing various tasks. Often they are rewarded along with in-game cash or prizes. In addition to the main tournament, daily challenges are available for players to win trophies. Players' scores are recorded and ranked against all other players on the same platform. Additionally, statistics are kept for each player and trophies are awarded for predefined achievements. Adding to the challenge of the game is a gopher, known as Gutsy McDivot, who will stop at nothing to get revenge on the golfers who killed his ancestor, Bravetooth. As the player progresses, cutscenes are shown of McDivot making a contraption he dubs the "Golfinator".

Each Fairway Solitaire course offers water hazards and sand traps. Water hazards are special water cards which must be cleared from the board before the cards to its right are revealed. Sand traps are sand cards which are not revealed until the 'sand wedge' card is uncovered. Occasionally, a player will reveal an iron card. Iron cards have a specific golf club on them and act as magic playing cards without breaking the current drive. A person may play a club at any time to continue adding to a long drive. The clubs are restricted to the 2-9 irons. During Fairway Solitaire game play, wild cards are randomly revealed. One may choose to randomly select an event or pay to skip the risk. The cost to skip is either two cards or $300. These wild cards offer varying opportunities and challenges.

The Fairway Solitaire Club House has a golf shop wherein players can purchase equipment to help them during tournament play. The equipment assists the player during actual game play or during wild card play. Items may vary depending on gender. Handicaps which improve a player's performance on a course can be purchased in the shop with Golf bucks, an in-game currency that is earned through gameplay. Golf bucks can also be used to purchase additional courses for the game.

== Development ==
The Mac version of Fairway Solitaire omits 'Solitaire' from the title, retitling it to just Fairway. A "completely rewritten" version of the Mac version titled Fairway Collector’s Edition was also released. A port of Fairway Solitaire was planned as a launch title for the Windows Phone 8, but was delayed for a year, ultimately releasing in 2013.

== Reception ==
Reception

Review scores
Publication	Score
Inside Mac Games	9.25/10 (Mac)
Pocket Gamer	8/10 (iOS)
TouchArcade	4/5 (iOS)

Fairway Solitaire received generally positive reviews from critics. Multiple critics noted the game as 'strategic'. Kotaku called its game design as "clever", and Pocket Gamer described the game's combination of golf and solitare as "inventive", calling it "hugely enjoyable" due to the "surprising amount of strategic opportunity" in its gameplay. Game Informer noted it as "hopelessly addict[ing]", and called it "a great puzzle game with a surprising amount of depth and strategy". TouchArcade also praised it as 'addicting', stating in regards to its gameplay that "what it lacks in difficulty it makes up for in sheer mindless entertainment".

Inside Mac Games praised the amount of content in the game, stating that the game has a "great feeling of variety", but criticized the fact that the iOS version has features not present in the Mac version, such as daily courses and additional minigames. IMG praised the game's attention to detail, as well as itscartoony graphics and "funny" cutscenes, further expressing that "everything is beautifully drawn and animated". IMG noted the game's music, sound effects, and golf commentators as highlights of the game, saying that it has "the best voice work I've ever heard in a game".

During the 16th Annual D.I.C.E. Awards, the Academy of Interactive Arts & Sciences nominated Fairway Solitaire for "Casual Game of the Year" and "Mobile Game of the Year".

== Legacy ==
In 2011, Big Fish Games released a sequel titled Fairway Fever, a timed version of the game released on Facebook, which was later made unavailable by 2013, and incorporated as an additional mode in the Mac version of Fairway. A second sequel, Fairway Solitaire Blast, was released on April 3, 2014 for iOS & Android devices.
