= Boomzap Entertainment =

Video game developer

- Type: Private
- Industry: Video games Casual games
- Founded: Singapore and United States (2005)
- Key people: Allan Simonsen; Christopher Natsuume
- Number of employees: 30 (October 2017)

Boomzap Entertainment is a casual games developer registered in Singapore with a virtual office environment. It was formed in 2005 and has released 50 games to date that are ported on various platforms. Boomzap has developed for Microsoft Windows, Mac OS X, Nintendo DS, Wii, iOS, and Android. Its games are available on games portals such as Big Fish Games, Yahoo!, WildTangent, GameHouse, Google Play, Amazon, iTunes, Steam and others.

Boomzap is known in the game industry for being one of the few companies to use a pure virtual office environment. Articles have been written on the subject in the Casual Games Association Magazine and Gamasutra regarding their prototyping methods. A feature article on Gamasutra was released on April 1, 2010, that further elaborated Boomzap's "quick and dirty" production process for making games.

== History ==
Boomzap was founded in 2005 by Christopher Natsuume and Allan Simonsen. Natsuume, the company's Creative Director was formerly lead producer for Far Cry at Crytek. Simonsen serves as the company's Technical Director and worked on the Spider-Man game for the Nokia N-Gage. Boomzap Entertainment is composed of two legal entities: Boomzap Inc. in the state of Washington, USA and Boomzap Pte. Ltd. in Singapore. Both companies are private corporations owned by Natsuume and Simonsen.

Boomzap also has an active presence in worldwide independent game development industry. Founders Natsuume and Simonsen, as well as other members of the studio, speak at conferences around the world such as Game Connection, Casual Connect, Game Developers Conference, and Global Mobile Game Developers Conference, and help coordinate the different chapters of the International Game Developers Association. Most recently, Boomzap has participated in the Manila site of the Global Game Jam.

As of October 2017, the company employs 30 game developers working out of Japan, Singapore, Russia, Ukraine, Indonesia, Malaysia, Thailand, and the Philippines.

=== Boomzap Fight Club ===
In October 2014, Boomzap announced a new brand called Boomzap Fight Club to house its free-to-play, mobile-first strategy games.

== Games developed ==
Year	Title	Publisher	Platform(s)		
Year	Title	Publisher	PC	Console	Mobile
2006	Jellyboom	Big Fish Games, Boonty, Double Games	Microsoft Windows	—	—
2006	Magic Lanterns	Boomzap Entertainment	Microsoft Windows	—	—
2006	Jewels of Cleopatra	Encore, Inc.	Microsoft Windows	—	iOS
2008	Hoyle Enchanted Puzzles	Encore, Inc.	Microsoft Windows	—	—
2008	Zen Fashion	Big Fish Games	Microsoft Windows	—	—
2008	Jewels of Cleopatra 2: Aztec Mysteries	Encore, Inc.	Microsoft Windows	—	iOS
2009	Orchard	Majesco	Microsoft Windows	—	—
2009	Frogs in Love	Big Fish Games, Oberon, PlayFirst, Pogo, WildGames	Microsoft Windows	—	—
2009	Passport to Paradise	Big Fish Games	Microsoft Windows	—	—
2010	Pirates Plund-Arrr	Majesco	—	Wii	—
2010	Awakening: The Dreamless Castle	Big Fish Games	Microsoft Windows, Mac OS X	—	iOS
2010	Antique Road Trip: USA	Big Fish Games	Microsoft Windows, Mac OS X	—	Android, iOS
2010	Awakening: Moonfell Wood	Big Fish Games	Microsoft Windows, Mac OS X	—	iOS
2010	Death at Fairing Point: A Dana Knightstone Novel	Big Fish Games	Microsoft Windows, Mac OS X	—	iOS
2011	Antique Road Trip 2: Homecoming	Big Fish Games	Microsoft Windows, Mac OS X	—	Android, iOS
2011	Awakening: The Goblin Kingdom	Big Fish Games	Microsoft Windows, Mac OS X	—	iOS
2011	Death Under Tuscan Skies: A Dana Knightstone Novel	Big Fish Games	Microsoft Windows, Mac OS X	—	iOS
2012	Otherworld: Spring of Shadows	Big Fish Games	Microsoft Windows, Mac OS X	—	iOS
2012	ZapTales	Boomzap Entertainment	—	—	iOS
2012	Awakening: The Skyward Castle	Big Fish Games	Microsoft Windows, Mac OS X	—	iOS
2012	Botanica: Into the Unknown	Big Fish Games	Microsoft Windows, Mac OS X	—	iOS
2012	Death Upon An Austrian Sonata: A Dana Knightstone Novel	Big Fish Games	Microsoft Windows, Mac OS X	—	iOS
2013	Otherworld: Omens of Summer	Big Fish Games	Microsoft Windows, Mac OS X	—	iOS
2013	Awakening: The Sunhook Spire	Big Fish Games	Microsoft Windows, Mac OS X	—	iOS
2013	Brain Curve	Boomzap Entertainment	—	—	iOS
2013	Antique Road Trip: American Dreamin'	Big Fish Games	Microsoft Windows	—	iOS
2013	Otherworld: Shades of Fall	Big Fish Games	Microsoft Windows, Mac OS X	—	iOS
2013	Death at Cape Porto: A Dana Knightstone Novel	Big Fish Games	Microsoft Windows, Mac OS X	—	iOS
2013	Botanica: Earthbound	Big Fish Games	Microsoft Windows, Mac OS X	—	—
2013	Awakening Kingdoms	Big Fish Games	Microsoft Windows	—	iOS
2014	Emberwing: Lost Legacy	Big Fish Games	Microsoft Windows, Mac OS X	—	iOS
2014	Awakening: The Redleaf Forest	Big Fish Games	Microsoft Windows, Mac OS X	—	iOS
2014	The Claw	Boomzap Entertainment	—	—	iOS
2014	Doors of Fate	Boomzap Entertainment	—	—	iOS
2014	Gladiator Fight	Boomzap Entertainment	—	—	iOS
2014	Death and Betrayal in Romania: A Dana Knightstone Novel	Big Fish Games	Microsoft Windows, Mac OS X	—	iOS
2014	Pillage People	Boomzap Entertainment	—	—	Android, iOS
2014	Super Awesome Quest	Boomzap Entertainment	—	—	Android, iOS
2014	Awakening: The Golden Age	Big Fish Games	Microsoft Windows, Mac OS X	—	iOS
2014	Rescue Quest	Chillingo	—	—	Android, iOS
2015	Pocket Ages	505 Games	—	—	iOS
2015	Magic Puzzle Island	Gravity Co. Ltd.	—	—	Android
2016	Super Awesome RPG	Boomzap Entertainment	—	—	Android, iOS
2016	Monster Roller	Boomzap Entertainment	—	—	Android, iOS
2016	Legends of Callasia	Boomzap Entertainment	Microsoft Windows, Mac OS X	—	Android, iOS
2016	Cathy's Crafts	GameHouse	Microsoft Windows, Mac OS X	—	Android, iOS
2016	Jewel Quest: Seven Seas	iWin	Microsoft Windows, Mac OS X	—	Android, iOS
2017	Rescue Quest Gold	Boomzap Entertainment	Microsoft Windows, Mac OS X	—	Android
2017	Sally's Salon: Beauty Secrets	GameHouse	Microsoft Windows, Mac OS X	—	Android, iOS
2017	Cubis Kingdoms	iWin	Microsoft Windows	—	Android, iOS

=== Jelly Boom ===
Jelly Boom is Boomzap's first game, and it was released on February 14, 2006. Jelly Boom is a block puzzle game, wherein you combine blocks of similar colors and eliminate them when a detonator falls unto the blocks. Jelly Boom was published online by publishers like Big Fish Games, Boonty, and Double Games. It also reached #1 on Boonty's Top Games chart.

=== Magic Lanterns ===
Magic Lanterns was first released on June 13, 2006. Magic Lanterns is a casual puzzle game where you have to click on a group of lanterns to clear them. The lanterns in most game modes refill the screen, so when lanterns are cleared, there are new ones. The more lanterns you clear, the higher your score. The game has different game modes, which have different mechanics: Lantern Quest, Perfect Mode, Panic Mode, and Puzzle Mode.

=== Hoyle Enchanted Puzzles ===
In 2007, Boomzap released the game Hoyle Enchanted Puzzles, also published by Encore, Inc. Hoyle Enchanted Puzzles is a collection of nine different puzzle mini-games in a light fantasy theme. It placed in the iWin's Top 100 chart, peaking at #3 and staying within the Top 10 for 21 days. According to a review by Jayisgames, Hoyle Enchanted Puzzles is "A solid collection of puzzles built into a lasting and interesting new whole." Gamezebo gave the game 4 out of 5 stars in its review, stating that "while the puzzle themes will be immediately familiar to casual games, the developer added enough of a new twist to most of these digital diversions to keep us glued to the PC for hours."

=== Jewels of Cleopatra series ===
Boomzap developed the tile-matching puzzle series, Jewels of Cleopatra (released in 2007) under publisher Encore, Inc. Gamezebo gave 3.5 of out 5 stars to the original Jewels of Cleopatra, stating "What it all adds up to is a well-made, enjoyable gem-matching romp in full Egyptian garb.".

Jewels of Cleopatra 2: Aztec Mysteries was released in 2008, developed by Boomzap under publisher Encore, Inc. It gave the same rating of 3.5 stars to the sequel, noting that "Armchair adventurers who enjoy Match-3 games will no doubt enjoy clicking through the story-heavy Jewels of Cleopatra 2: Aztec Mysteries."

=== Zen Fashion ===
On May 21, 2008, Zen Fashion was released on Big Fish Games and other casual game portals. Zen Fashion is a drag-matching Match-3 type puzzle game.

=== Orchard ===
In 2007, Boomzap received funding from the Media Development Authority of Singapore to create a game demo for the game Orchard, which was later signed by Majesco. The game was released in January 2009. It also ranked #1 on Amazon.com, Arcade Town and PlayFirst.

=== Frogs In Love ===
Boomzap released Frogs In Love on April 15, 2009. You play the role of a frog who falls in love with a beautiful female frog, Jasmine. But to win her heart, you have to prove yourself by winning challenges at the Flower Festival. It is a puzzle game with 13 different kinds of puzzles. Frogs In Love was published on portals such as Big Fish Games, Oberon, PlayFirst, Pogo, and WildGames.

=== Passport to Paradise ===
On December 24, 2009, Passport to Paradise was released by iWin. The game peaked at #4 on the Top 10 Games on iWin's portal, and was the #1 Tycoon game on iWin for the same week.

=== Pirates Plund-Arrr ===
On January 7, 2010, Majesco announced Pirates Plund-Arrr, a Nintendo Wii game being developed by Boomzap Entertainment. It was scheduled for release in April 2010, and was eventually released in May 2010.

=== Awakening series ===
Awakening is a game franchise in the hidden object puzzle adventure genre published exclusively by Big Fish Games. It is available on PC, Mac, as well as iPhone and iPad platforms. The first game, Awakening: The Dreamless Castle, was originally released on February 14, 2010. As of November 2014, Awakening consists of eight titles, seven of which are full, downloadable games while one is a free-to-play version.

Awakening: The Redleaf Forest is the sixth and final installment in Queen Sophia's adventures released on May 31, 2014. A seventh title, Awakening: The Golden Age was released on November 1, 2014, to serve as a prequel to the series.

Awakening Kingdoms is a stand-alone game that is not meant to replace the adventure series, but serves as "an endless game world that players can continuously explore and enjoy".

As of August 2014, games from the Awakening series have been downloaded over 17 million times on PC, Mac and mobile devices.

=== Antique Road Trip series ===
Antique Road Trip is a game series in the hidden object genre, with puzzles and different minigames. As of September 2013, Boomzap has released three Antique Road Trip games, all published exclusively by Big Fish Games and available on PC, Mac, iPhone, iPad ad Android platforms.

After Antique Road Trip: USA and Antique Road Trip 2: Homecoming follows the latest installment Antique Road Trip: American Dreamin, the first free-to-play game developed by Boomzap. It was released on September 25, 2013.

=== Dana Knightstone series ===
Dana Knightstone is a series of hidden object games with a mystery novel storyline published exclusively by Big Fish Games. It is available on PC, Mac, iPhone and iPad platforms. The franchise draws it title from the main character, Dana Knightstone, a fiction writer who can see ghosts.

As of August 2014, there are five games in the series: Death at Fairing Point: A Dana Knightstone Novel, Death Under Tuscan Skies: A Dana Knightstone Novel, Death Upon an Austrian Sonata: A Dana Knightstone Novel, Death at Cape Porto: A Dana Knightstone Novel, and Death and Betrayal in Romania: A Dana Knightstone Novel.

=== Otherworld series ===
Otherworld is a hidden object adventure game series with a dark fantasy theme. Fiona, a young girl with magical powers, was abducted by a dark and menacing creature.

Otherworld: Spring of Shadows was the first game to be released on January 23, 2012. The sequel, Otherworld: Omens of Summer, was released on February 4, 2013. Both are published exclusively by Big Fish Games. The games are available on PC, Mac, iPhone and iPad platforms.

Otherworld: Shades of Fall is the third installment published exclusively by Big Fish Games. It was released on October 17, 2013, for both PC and Mac, then for iPad and iPhone on November 5, 2014.

=== Zaptales: Interactive Fairy Tales ===
In 2012, an interactive story book app called ZapTales: Interactive Fairy Tales was developed by Boomzap and published by Big Fish Games. It can be downloaded for free on iPhone and iPad platforms with in-app purchases for additional content. Aside from virtual books, minigames and puzzles were also available. The fairy tales were adapted from the works of Hans Christian Andersen, Brothers Grimm and Charles Perrault. Boomzap also added its own educational books. According to a reviewer, the "sweet graphics, sounds and animations, professional narration, simple navigation" made it an enjoyable and quality game."

=== Botanica series ===
Botanica is a series of casual hidden object puzzle adventure games published exclusively by Big Fish Games. It is a combination of fantasy and science fiction with versions available on PC, Mac, iPhone and iPad.

Botanica: Into the Unknown was the first game to be released on October 22, 2012. The sequel entitled Botanica: Earthbound was launched on December 14, 2013.

=== Brain Curve ===
On May 19, 2013, Boomzap released the freemium game Brain Curve for iPhone and iPad devices. It is an educational puzzle game that allows players to check their brain skills and compare their scores with friends in various minigames.

=== Emberwing: Lost Legacy ===
On March 15, 2014, Boomzap launched Emberwing: Lost Legacy Collector's Edition, a brand new hidden object puzzle adventure game set in a magical world filled with dragons. It was released exclusively on Big Fish Games for PC and Mac platforms. All About Casual Game gave it a rating of 4.5 out of 5 stars, describing it as "one of Boomzap's finest products" because of its "stellar production, superior graphics and well-exquisite gameplay."

=== Boomzap Casino Games ===
On July 24, 2014, Boomzap released mini casino games with real money betting powered by the b Spot platform. All three games have two modes where players can "Play for Cash or Play for Fun". These are available only in the United States for the iPhone and iPad platforms.

The Claw is a simulation game of a standard claw machine. Players have the chance to get rare prizes or common items, complete puzzles and unlock unique claw machines and backgrounds.

Doors of Fate is a probability puzzle game based on luck and intuition wherein players must choose one of three doors and encounter obstacles or win treasure. There are also different doors and backtgrounds to collect.

Gladiator Fight is fast-paced fighting game with simple, easy-tap combat wherein two gladiators battle inside an arena. Players can customize their gladiator and unlock hundreds of collectibles.

=== Pillage People ===
Pillage People is an online strategy game released in September 2014 for iOS and Android devices in Singapore, Indonesia, Malaysia and the Philippines. It won Best Narrative in the Philippine Game Festival 2014 organized by the Game Developers Association of the Philippines, and was also nominated for other award categories such as Best Game Art, Best Gameplay, Best Mobile Handheld, Game and Game of the Year.

Unlike other similar real-time strategy games, it features three different races with fantasy and medieval themes. Players can choose from the Humans, Elves and Goblins and eventually complete them all. They can build their towns, train troops, and attack other bases through both single-player and multiplayer campaigns.

Pillage People is described by Flipgeeks as "a non-stop romp of resource gathering and pillaging", at the same time "the graphics look very polished" and "the sound design is impressive". It also has "fun visuals and an exciting soundtrack".

=== Super Awesome Quest ===
Super Awesome Quest is a fantasy adventure role-playing game with turn-based collectible card game style combat. In October 2014, it was soft-launched for iOS and Android devices in Singapore, Indonesia, Malaysia and the Philippines. It was also a finalist for the Best Sound Design, Best Game Art, and Game of the Year categories in the Philippine Game Festival 2014 organized by the Game Developers Association of the Philippines. It was released worldwide on July 9, 2015.

Super Awesome Quest follows the adventures of a paladin and his friends. It features strategic, token-flipping combat and an in-depth crafting system. It is "an interesting mix of RPG, Fighting Game, Card Game" and described as "a nice refresher from the card-based combat" The game was given a perfect score of 5 out of 5 stars by Gamezebo, calling it an "excellent adventure" and "a blend between Minesweeper and a dungeon crawler".

=== Rescue Quest ===
On November 25, 2014, Boomzap launched Rescue Quest for the iPhone and iPad under publisher Chillingo. It is a scrollable, path-based match-3 puzzle game with a fantasy storyline, featuring two magical apprentices on a mission to save fairy-like creatures called Spritelings from an evil sorcerer. The Android version was released on August 18, 2015.

A reskinned version was later developed and published in the Korean language. 마법퍼즐 아일랜드 (English: Magic Puzzle Island) for Kakao was published by Gravity Co. Ltd. on April 14, 2015, for Android devices.

In 2017, all distribution rights for this game were returned to Boomzap Entertainment. A remastered premium version removing all the free-to-play elements and replaced with a Try and Buy business model was later released. Rescue Quest Gold was launched in June 2017 as a premium title for PC and Mac on Steam and other gaming portals, followed by an Android release in August 2017.

=== Pocket Ages ===
Pocket Ages was released on February 18, 2015, for the iPhone and iPad. Developed by Boomzap and published worldwide by 505 Games, it is a town-building and trade simulation game that spans multiple eras. The initial release includes four ages: Prehistoric, Ancient, Classical, and Medieval.

=== 마법퍼즐 아일랜드 for Kakao ===
마법퍼즐 아일랜드 (English: Magic Puzzle Island) for Kakao was published by Gravity Co. Ltd. on April 14, 2015, for Android devices. It is a reskinned version of Boomzap's match-3 game, Rescue Quest and published in the Korean language.

=== Super Awesome RPG ===
Super Awesome RPG was released worldwide by Boomzap in January 2016 for mobile devices. It is a reskinned version of another game by the studio, Super Awesome Quest, with an anime art style and premium "pay once and play" business model instead of free-to-play. It has no advertisements or in-app purchases.

=== Monster Roller ===
Monster Roller is a monster-collecting strategy game for mobile devices which uses a slot machine combat mechanic. It soft-launched in the Philippines in December 2015, winning Game of the Year at the ESGS Indie Arena 2015 and Best Game Art at the GDAP Awards 2015. It was later released worldwide on January 27, 2016, with support for multiple languages.

=== Legends of Callasia ===
In December 2015, Boomzap launched Kickstarter and Steam Greenlight campaigns for Legends of Callasia. It is a turn-based multiplayer strategy game wherein the main goal is world conquest across board game-inspired maps. It was successfully Greenlit on Steam last January 1, 2016 and released as an Early Access for Windows on February 11, 2016. The game officially launched on Steam for both PC and Mac on June 10, 2016, followed by a mobile tablet release on the App Store on September 8, 2016, and Google Play on December 8, 2016, allowing for cross-platform multiplayer gameplay. Another Kickstarter campaign was launched to fund an expansion called "The Stoneborne" to include a new playable faction, which was then released on October 17, 2016, as a DLC on Steam and an in-app purchase on the mobile versions.

== Awards and Recognitions ==
Aside from rankings in top downloads charts, Boomzap games have also been nominated and awarded in several websites and institutions such as All About Casual Game, Big Fish Games, Casual Gameplay, Game Developers Association of the Philippines, and The Straits Times.

Title	Award/s
Awakening: The Goblin Kingdom	Best Hidden Object Game (Casual Gameplay 2011); Best Story (Big Fish Games 2011); Greatest Games of All Time (All About Casual Game)
Awakening: The Skyward Castle	Best Adventure (Big Fish Games 2012) #5 Best Hidden Object Adventure (Casual Gameplay 2012); Best Visuals nominee (All About Casual Game 2012); Best-Selling Games (All About Casual Game 2012); Editor's Picks (All About Casual Game 2012)
Awakening: The Sunhook Spire	#3 Game of the Year (Big Fish Games 2013); Best Adventure Game nominee (All About Casual Game 2013); Best Made-in-Singapore Game nominee (The Straits Times Digital Life Awards 2014)
Awakening: The Redleaf Forest	Best Hidden Object Game (All About Casual Game 2014) #3 Best Sequel (All About Casual Game 2014) #3 Most Anticipated Game (Big Fish Games 2014)
Awakening: The Golden Age	Best Audio nominee (All About Casual Game 2014)
Awakening Kingdoms	Best Free-to-Play Game for PC (All About Casual Game 2014)
Botanica: Into the Unknown	#2 Best Concept (All About Casual Game 2012)
Botanica: Earthbound	Best Sequel nominee (All About Casual Game 2014)
Death Upon an Austrian Sonata: A Dana Knightstone Novel	#2 Best Story (Big Fish Games 2012); Best Story nominee (All About Casual Game Best of 2012); Greatest Games of All Time (All About Casual Game)
Death at Cape Porto: A Dana Knightstone Novel	Best Adventure Game nominee (All About Casual Game 2014)
Emberwing: Lost Legacy	Best Original Game nominee (All About Casual Game 2014)
Legends of Callasia	Best Multiplayer Game (International Mobile Gaming Awards - Southeast Asia 2016); Excellence in Gameplay (International Mobile Gaming Awards - Southeast Asia 2016); Editors Pick for Creativity (SlideDB App of the Year 2016); Multiplayer Game of the Year Runner-up (Pocket Tactics Best of 2016); Best Local Game Finalist (The Straits Times Digital Awards 2017)
Monster Roller	Game of the Year (E-Sports and Gaming Summit 2015 Indie Arena); Best Game Art (Game Developers Association of the Philippines Awards 2015)
Otherworld: Spring of Shadows	#3 Best Visuals (All About Casual Game 2012); Best-Selling Games finalist (All About Casual Game 2012); Editor's Picks finalist (All About Casual Game 2012); Greatest Games of All Time (All About Casual Game)
Otherworld: Omens of Summer	Best Adventure Game nominee (All About Casual Game 2013); Best Sequel nominee (All About Casual Game 2013); Editor's Picks (All About Casual Game 2013)
Pillage People	Best Narrative (Philippine Game Festival 2014); Best Game Art finalist (Philippine Game Festival 2014); Best Gameplay finalist (Philippine Game Festival 2014); Best Mobile Handheld Game finalist (Philippine Game Festival 2014); Game of the Year finalist (Philippine Game Festival 2014)
Super Awesome Quest	Best Game Art finalist (Philippine Game Festival 2014); Best Sound Design finalist (Philippine Game Festival 2014); Game of the Year finalist (Philippine Game Festival 2014); Best Made-in-Singapore Game nominee (The Straits Times Digital Life Awards 2015)
