= Fall Guys =

2020 video game

- Developer: Mediatonic (Note: Additional support provided by Wushu Studios, Red Kite Games, The Multiplayer Group, Room 8 Studio, Super Spline Studios, Lionbridge Games, Bosi, Infinsteam and Rocket Science Games)
- Publishers: Devolver Digital (Note: 2020–2021); Epic Games (Note: 2021–present)
- Director: Jamie Riding
- Producer: Alex Ruse
- Designer: Joseph Walsh
- Programmers: Joel Herber; Rakesh Vangur
- Artists: Rob Jackson; Ash Kerins; Dan Hoang; Nicolas Pessina
- Composers: Jukio Kallio (Note: 2020–October 2022); Daniel Hagström; Leonardo Lima (Note: May 2024–November 2025); Thirty Two Music (Note: 'Chill Your Beans' soundtrack)
- Engine: Unity
- Platforms: PlayStation 4; Windows; Nintendo Switch; PlayStation 5; Xbox One; Xbox Series X/S; Android; iOS
- Release: PS4, Windows: WW: 4 August 2020; Switch, PS5, Xbox One, Series X/S: WW: 21 June 2022; Android: WW: 16 August 2024; iOS: EU: 16 August 2024
- Genres: Battle royale, platform
- Mode: Multiplayer

Fall Guys (formerly known as Fall Guys: Ultimate Knockout) is a 2020 free-to-play platform battle royale game developed by Mediatonic and originally published by Devolver Digital for the PlayStation 4 and Windows. It was acquired by Epic Games and subsequently made free-to-play on 21 June 2022 and released on additional platforms including Nintendo Switch, PlayStation 5, Xbox One and Xbox Series X/S, with full cross-platform play support among all platforms. As part of the transition, the game adopted a paid battle pass system for its monetisation. On 16 August 2024, the game was released on mobile via the Epic Games Store, worldwide on Android and only in the European Union on iOS.

The main game involves up to 32 players who control bean-shaped characters and compete against each other in a series of randomly selected mini-games, such as obstacle courses and survival challenges. Players are eliminated as the rounds progress until, eventually, the last remaining player or team is crowned the winner. There are also many other modes, such as Explore, with different game rules and player counts. The game draws inspiration from game shows like Takeshi's Castle, It's a Knockout, Total Wipeout, and playground games like tag and British Bulldog.

Fall Guys received generally positive reviews from critics for its chaotic gameplay and visual appearance. The game was a commercial success, selling more than 10 million copies and attracting more than 50 million players after the game went free-to-play.

== Gameplay ==
In the standard "Classic" and "Knockout" modes, up to 32 players compete in matches with battle royale style gameplay. Players, represented as jellybean-like figures, move around in a three-dimensional playing field, with abilities such as jumping, diving, dive sliding, piggybacking, and grabbing. Players can also use power-ups in select levels, which grant players unique abilities for either a limited amount of time or until the round ends. The aim is to qualify for subsequent rounds by successfully completing each of the randomly selected mini-games, many of which have randomly selected variations. There are currently seven different types of levels in Fall Guys; Course, Survival, Points, Team, Logic, Invisibeans, and Final.

The winner of the Final level is usually the winner of the match, except in Squads based modes where the winning player scores the victory for their whole team.

In the "Explore" and "Creator Spotlight" modes, up to 20 players can play continuous creative levels until they choose to finish. Players are able to skip levels and load into the next once qualified, earning 5 crown shards per completed level.

=== Currency ===
Using an in-game currency, "Kudos", players can purchase single cosmetics, nameplates, nicknames, patterns, faceplates, and colours, for their character to show off in-game. Players obtain Kudos by playing the game or progressing in the Fame Pass. Players receive crowns by winning a match. Crowns were a premium currency until 21 June 2022, whereas they now count towards Crown Rank.

Season 1: Free for All added a premium in-game currency called "Show-Bucks", which can be used to purchase full costumes, premium colours, patterns, faceplates, emotes, celebrations and unlock a "supercharged" version of the Fame Pass. Players are only able to obtain Show-Bucks through the Fame Pass or by purchasing them via microtransactions.

New costumes are regularly added to be bought in the store. Some are characters from different video games and media franchises, such as Sonic the Hedgehog, Doom, Ratchet & Clank, Among Us, Astro's Playroom, Hatsune Miku, SpongeBob SquarePants, Hello Kitty, Tomb Raider, Pixar, Marvel, Disney, Final Fantasy, and others.

=== Fall Guys Creative ===
Season 4: Creative Construction added a level editor titled Fall Guys Creative. It allows users to create rounds with various obstacles and objects. Players can choose between making Course, Survival, or Points based rounds. There is a budget of 2500 points, which limits how many objects a round can contain. Players can submit their rounds and can share their rounds to others via share codes. Creative-made rounds can appear in the Discovery tab or the Explore mode.

== Game updates ==
New content is added to the game through updates. These can bring new tools, modes, bug fixes and Fame Passes. This has been present since 16 August 2023, when Mediatonic announced that they were moving away from Seasons to instead deliver more frequent updates.

=== Season Updates ===
Season 2 added banners, nicknames, and the ability to choose different shows with a different selection with the Game Selector.

Season 3 added the Crown Rank system. The same season added Prime Gaming exclusive rewards which only accessible if the user had an Amazon Prime subscription.

Season 4 added a basic daily challenge system. It also added the "Crown Shards" currency. In a mid-season update, they added to ability to host custom shows.

Season 5 added limited time events, and Duos/Trios shows. Later in the season, the main lobby was redesigned.

Season 6 added cross-progression, cross-play, and a game mode called Sweet Thieves, where one team is invisible (only being visible when moving fast) while the other team is not. The invisible team (Thieves) needs to bring sweets to the goals while the other team (Guardians) tries to prevent them by using the grabbing mechanic to capture the Thieves and put them in a jail. A button can be pressed every 30 seconds to remove the jail barrier.

Season 1: Free for All introduced Show-Bucks and added Bean Hill Zone, the first collaboration level, with Sonic the Hedgehog. On 5 March 2024 the level was removed from the game, including 'The Vault' show, for unknown reasons.

Season 2: Satellite Scramble added a Halloween-exclusive game mode called Treat Thieves, a Halloween themed version of Sweet Thieves, containing unique different gimmicks such as wormholes.

Season 3: Sunken Secrets added dive sliding and a Time Attack show. The maximum lobby size was decreased from 60 to 40 players for faster queue time. The same season also added 'The Vault', which features all levels regardless of vaulted status in one show, only available in Custom Games.

Fall Guys Creative logo

Season 4: Creative Construction added Fall Guys Creative, alongside a revamped Fame Pass system to replace the previous Season Pass.

=== Post Season Updates ===
The Power Party Update introduced power-ups. The same update also added the Discovery tab, a new tab in the Show Selector that shows Creative levels. Every few hours it refreshes with new levels.

The Survival Update added the ability to create Survival-type levels in Creative.

The Fall Forever Update added the 'Piggyback' mechanic. The same update also added the Explore and Knockout modes.

The Scrapyard Stumble Update added the ability to create Points-type levels in Creative, along with many items to score points. This includes the Rubber Chicken power-up, which can be used to break or move destructible and physics objects.

The November Update added the Creator Spotlight mode, which refreshes on a consistent two-week basis and features specific creator-made levels approved by Mediatonic.

The Ranked Knockout Update introduced the eponymous Ranked Knockout mode. Players must place well in Knockout games, in order to achieve the Superstar rank and earn the highest rewards in each eight-week cycle.

The Yeetropolis Update brought back the ability to earn Kudos at the end of games, a feature absent since Season 1: Free for All.

As of November 2025 all Classic levels (apart from Bean Hill Zone and Sweet/Treat Thieves) have been unvaulted and are available to play in the core shows.

== Fame Pass ==
The Fame Pass is an optional purchase that gives players extra cosmetics and in-game currencies. Before Season 1: Free for All, the Fame Pass (known as the Fame Path) only had 40 tiers and was completely free. Season 4 increased the path to 50.

Starting in Season 1: Free for All, the renamed 'Season Pass' was extended to 100 tiers with only half of the rewards being free. Season 2: Satellite Scramble added 100 extra tiers to the Season Pass, offering mostly crown shards and 3 bonus costumes.

Season 4: Creative Construction changed the game's live service model, offering multiple 'Fame Passes' over the course of the season. These passes would have 40 main tiers, with the rest of the 100 tier pass consisting of bonus costumes and crown shards. The same season also introduced the first (and only) collaboration Fame Pass with the game Final Fantasy XIV, featuring rewards themed around the Warriors of Light.

After the discontinuation of seasons, Fame Passes would remain constant, but were extended from 100 to 160 tiers. The March '24 Fame Pass was then extended to 300 tiers, but only 70 consisted of proper rewards. The May '24 Fame Pass and subsequent Fame Passes were decreased to just 70 tiers.

=== Seasons ===
Up until 16 August 2023 Fall Guys operated under a seasonal content cycle, which were major updates to the game that each had a unique theme and added new content (rounds, costumes, obstacles, mechanics and music). Seasons lasted for several months, and introduced a new Season Pass (originally called a Fame Path in Legacy Seasons) each time. They could be levelled up by playing shows and completing challenges to obtain a variety of customisation options and currencies such as Kudos and Crowns. On 21 June 2022, the seasons reset for the free-for-all release of the game. Since 16 August 2023 the game shifted away from seasonal content in favour of more consistent smaller updates.

=== Updates ===
Season	Nickname	Theme	Date	Levels	Content	Ref.
As Fall Guys: Ultimate Knockout
Season 1	Ultimate Knockout	Original	4 August 2020	25	Game release	
Season 2	Medieval Knockout	Medieval	8 October 2020	5	Show Selector Interface Customization	
Season 3	Winter Knockout	Winter	15 December 2020	8	Crown Rank Custom Shows	
Season 4	Fall Guys 4041	Future	22 March 2021	9	Squads Crown Shards Cross play	
Season 5	Jungle Adventure	Jungle	20 July 2021	7	Live Events Duos and Trios	
Season 6	Party Spectacular	Party	30 November 2021	6	Cross-platform progression Cross platform parties	
As Fall Guys
Season 1	Free for All	Sports/Stadium	21 June 2022	8	Free to Play relaunch Weekly/Marathon Challenges Show-Bucks	
Season 2	Satellite Scramble	Space	15 September 2022	9	Variations Events	
Season 3	Sunken Secrets	Underwater/Alantis	22 November 2022	5	Time Attack The Vault Dive Slide	
Season 4	Creative Construction	Digital/Low Poly	10 May 2023	50	Level Editor (Creative) Redesigned Show Selector	
Post Seasonal Updates
Summer Breeze		Digital/Low Poly	16 August 2023	14	The ability to emote in the lobby Objects in Creative	
Fall Force		Evergreen	27 September 2023	4	Options for Creative UI changes	
Tool Up		Evergreen	7 November 2023	-	Creative budget extended Overlapping for most Creative objects The ability to choose specific music for Rounds	
Power Party		Evergreen	6 December 2023	3	Bean Ball power-up The ability to scale objects in Creative Round tags Improved Discovery tab	
Shapes and Stickers		Evergreen	23 January 2024	2	Various objects of geometric shapes and stickers to Creative UI changes	
Survival Update		Evergreen	28 February 2024	7	Survival-type Rounds in Creative Invisibility and Party Crasher power-ups Hex tiles Elimination zones The ability to like and dislike Creative rounds	
Fall Forever		Evergreen	7 May 2024	23	"Explore" and "Knockout" modes Piggybacking Social wheels UI changes Game Selector updates	
June Update		Evergreen	11 June 2024	3	Physics changes Camera changes	
August Update		Evergreen	16 August 2024	25	Mobile Release 3D backgrounds Faster load times	
Scrapyard Stumble		Scrapyard	3 September 2024	19	Points-type Levels in Creative Destructibility and physics options for objects Rubber Chicken power-up	
Falloween 2024		Halloween	8 October 2024	5	Quality of life improvements Creative objects	
November Update		Original	7 November 2024	-	Creator Spotlight Custom object colors in Creative Customization for emoticons and phrases	
Winter Update		Wild West	10 December 2024	5	Slime' material for Creative Creative budget increase to 2500 "Improved" version of Time Attack	
Fall and Fantasy		Fantasy	4 February 2025	5	Fantasy-themed decorations, background and music The ability to see other players' Crown Rank	
Ranked Knockout		Wilderness	1 April 2025	5	"Ranked Knockout" mode Wilderness-themed decorations and background Creative VFX	
Yeetropolis		Metropolis	27 May 2025	4	Metropolis-themed decorations, background and VFX Rotation Controller improvements Earning Kudos after games	
Tropical Tides		Tropics	29 July 2025	4	Summertime themed decorations, background, movement controllers	
Slime Factory		-	16 September 2025	-	Unvaulted variants	

== Development ==
The conception of what became Fall Guys began when Mediatonic was discussing another project in January 2018. Lead designer Joe Walsh said that it reminded him of game shows such as Takeshi's Castle and Total Wipeout. He drew from that inspiration to create a pitch document for what would become Fall Guys. Originally titled Fools' Gauntlet (also later under development using the name Stumble Chums), Walsh's pitch featured 100 players competing in a battle royale composed of physical challenges. Creative director Jeff Tanton, while initially sceptical that creating another battle royale game would be successful, was quickly convinced of the game's potential, and forwarded Walsh's pitch to Mediatonic's founders.

Tanton and Walsh worked on a pitch deck, and principal concept artist Dan Hoang created images featuring colourful, bean-shaped characters racing on an obstacle course in the sky. Tanton explained that Hoang's character designs helped shift the focus of the game away from the obstacle course itself, to the characters. With the pitch deck completed, Tanton pitched the game to 10 different publishers at the 2018 Game Developers Conference. Six months after Devolver Digital agreed to publish the game, development began.

Fall Guys began its initial prototyping process with a small team, growing to 30 people during development. Initial progress on individual minigames was slow which caused the team to worry that there would not be enough content for launch. A turning point came when the team made a group of pillars that "took the opinions of people out of the occasion" and allowed the developers to "kill ideas faster". Such pillars include ensuring a minigame was "50-50 chaos and skill" and that a level had to be "different every time". Inspired by game shows, and differentiating from first-person shooter battle royale games, Mediatonic focused on gameplay variety. By presenting the player with several, randomised rounds of game modes, Mediatonic hoped to recreate the experience of being on a game show. To help keep the "spirit of playground games and game shows", Mediatonic created an internal rule that game modes needed to be explained in three words. Over time, the game underwent numerous other changes. The player count was decreased from 100 to 60, as overpopulated games "stopped being readable or fun". In testing, Mediatonic noted that players overestimated the number of players, stating "we didn't need as many players as we thought to create the crowds we wanted the gameplay to include."

It's a Knockout, a game show forcing contestants to dress up in oversized costumes, inspired the idea that the characters should "have that element of being completely uniquely, badly designed for the task that we were gonna put them through". The ragdoll physics is deliberate, to avoid "hyper athletic Ninja Warrior characters" and because "falling over is funny". According to Walsh, striking the right balance between funny ragdoll collisions and game performance was critical, because "as soon as you lose the ragdoll-ness of the character, you lose the comedy". The character designs were inspired by the look of vinyl toys.

Mediatonic began working on Season 2 before the game's release with level designer Joseph Juson, noting that it was more of an "expansion" compared to Season 3 where the team tried to bring new ideas.

== Release ==
Cover art featuring the game's old logo with the Ultimate Knockout subtitle

Fall Guys: Ultimate Knockout was announced at E3 in June 2019 and was released on 4 August 2020 for PlayStation 4 and Windows. Several updates ensued for the first season and on 8 October 2020, the medieval-themed second season was released. The success prompted more hiring. The Chinese company Bilibili announced in August 2020 that it would develop a mobile version for Android and iOS that would be exclusive to China. The deal expired in 2022 and Fall Guys announced that their exclusive content and accounts on Bilibili would be run by Epic from now on.

=== Post Release ===
In February 2021, Fall Guys was announced for Nintendo Switch, Xbox One, and Xbox Series X, scheduled for Summer 2021. However, in April 2021, these versions of the game were delayed to late 2021, citing greater focus on cross-compatibility among all versions of the game. On 30 November 2021, the release was delayed again to 2022.

In March 2021, Mediatonic and its parent company, Tonic Games Group, were bought by Epic Games. Epic Games later announced that they will focus on adding cross-platform compatibility for all versions of Fall Guys, utilising resources from games such as Fortnite that became available after acquisition by Epic Games.

On 18 November 2021, Mediatonic announced that Epic Games accounts will be required in season 6 allowing cross-platform progression between PS4 and Steam and the ability to have custom names for Steam players. On 22 February 2022, Mediatonic released an update adding Lobbies and Friends lists. This uses the Epic Overlay system that games like Fortnite or Rocket League have to invite anyone on any platform via Epic Games Accounts.

On 15 March 2022, Mediatonic announced that starting on 5 April 2022 there would be a new launcher that all PlayStation players would need to download to keep playing the game. On 9 May 2022, the old PlayStation launcher shut down and became unusable. Both launchers were the same besides the new one being published by Epic Games instead of Devolver Digital. People who downloaded the new launcher would be able to redeem a free DLC Pink Shark costume that was able to be redeemed until the end of season 6.

Mediatonic and Epic Games transitioned Fall Guys to a free-to-play system alongside its 21 June release on Xbox One, Xbox Series X/S and Nintendo Switch. Additionally, a dedicated PlayStation 5 version also released, featuring enhanced visuals and DualSense effects. The game was also rebranded as Fall Guys, without the Ultimate Knockout subtitle. The free-to-play version eliminated the need for players to have console subscription services like PlayStation Plus to be able to play. To support the free-to-play model, the game included a new season pass system with both a free and premium tier of rewards, the latter available to those that purchase the premium pass with real-world funds. For Windows, the game was removed from the Steam storefront and made available on Epic Games Store, though the Steam version will continue to be updated in sync with the Epic Games Store version. The free-to-play versions of Fall Guys also added support for cross-platform play with other platforms. Players who had purchased Fall Guys before this transition were given a "Legacy Pack", which included costumes and the Season 1: Free for All premium Season Pass for free.

On 21 February 2023, Mediatonic announced in a blogpost that Seasons will be longer than 2–3 months for future seasons to allow for more time to work on future seasons. They also announced a level editor which was originally teased in 2022 called Creative. Creative launched on 10 May 2023.As of Season 3: Sunken Secrets, Jukio Kallio no longer composes the game's music.

On 17 July 2023, Fall Guys' show-bucks prices were increased in the United Kingdom, Mexico, and Canada due to inflation. On 17 September 2023, it was announced that the price for Show-Bucks would also be increasing in Czech Republic, Denmark, Eurozone countries, Hungary, Japan, Norway, Poland, Romania, Sweden, Turkey and the United States for similar reasons.

On 16 August 2023, it was announced that Seasons would be phased out in favour of more frequent updates, but that Fame Passes would remain. Tim Sweeney stated that Fall Guys and Rocket League will not be discontinued despite mass layoffs, and that Epic Games would continue to invest in them.

The inside of Mediatonic's office on 28 September 2023. The word Mediatonic was rearranged to spell 'decimation' as a response to Epic Games laying off over 830 employees, with Mediatonic being severely affected by the layoffs. While it is unknown how many employees were fired, many former employees announced their unemployment on Twitter.

On 16 August 2024, Fall Guys was released on Android worldwide and IOS devices in the EU via the Epic Games Store relaunch on mobile devices. The Fall and Fantasy Update announced that a Ranked mode would be released with the next update, which came in the form of "Ranked Knockout" on 1 April 2025. On 23 January 2026 a Fall Guys limited time mode titled 'Crown Jam' was released in Fortnite.

== Reception ==
Reception

Aggregate score
Aggregator	Score
Metacritic	PC: 80/100; PS4: 81/100

Review scores
Publication	Score
Destructoid	8/10
Game Informer	8.75/10
GameRevolution	3.5/5
GameSpot	7/10
GameStar	78/100
IGN	8/10
PC Gamer (US)	80/100
PC Games (DE)	8/10
Push Square	8/10
USgamer	4/5

Fall Guys received "generally favourable" reviews, according to review aggregator website Metacritic. A clone game called Stumble Guys was released for mobile devices on 23 September 2020, and became popular.

Tom Wiggins of Stuff magazine praised the game, calling it "Super Monkey Ball for the Fortnite generation". Mercury News praised the "controlled chaos" gameplay of Fall Guys, stating it to be utilising a combination of the elements from the battle royale game Fortnite and the party game Mario Party in such a way that made it "tailored to the coronavirus age". Ollie Toms from Rock, Paper, Shotgun praised Fall Guys for its creative approach as a battle royale game incorporating family-friendly elements rather than resorting to violent themes. He praised the simplicity of the game and the diversity of content added with each season. He argues that the ragdoll physics can be both exciting and frustrating to play: "What really makes and breaks this game is the imprecision of your actions. It's not something many competitive games can get away with in the way Fall Guys does."

The weekend before release during a closed beta, Fall Guys briefly became the most-watched game on Twitch as well as the sixth-best-selling Steam game where it was available for pre-order.

Fall Guys has been frequently compared to Among Us, in that both are online games which grew in popularity during the COVID-19 pandemic. Both also have similar characters, commonly called "Beans" by both communities.

The addition of Squad Mode in Season 4 was positively received. Kotaku says it evokes a new perspective on intense gameplay, indicating the importance of teamwork. The addition of Sweet Thieves has been positively received. The website Destructoid says "This is the most fun I've had with Fall Guys in forever." and "If you care about trophies, Sweet Thieves is worth checking out. But it stands on its own, too."

On 11 October 2022, the hashtag #savefallguys started trending on Twitter. This was to elicit Mediatonic's attention to address and resolve numerous problems that players have had with the game including lack of round variety, bugs, sub par events, prices in the in-game shop, implementation of skill based matchmaking, and more. On 15 November 2022, the Fall Guys Twitter account stated that in order for the game to stay stable, some rounds will be "vaulted" and rounds will be rotated in and out of the vault. This meant that some rounds will be temporarily removed to increase stability across all platforms. Players criticised this move, citing how removing pre-existing rounds causes the game to lose its replay value. Starting with the Fall Forever Update, the "vault" was officially discontinued and as of November 2025 all levels previously vaulted (apart from Bean Hill Zone) have been unvaulted.

Following the Slime Factory Update, players became concerned with the lack of any new content beyond cosmetics and events scheduled until January 2027. This has led players to believe Mediatonic placed the game onto autopilot or has plans to shut the game down in the near future. As of 2026 the game hasn't received a major update.

=== Sales ===
Within 24 hours of release, the game had an active player base of more than 1.5 million players. On 10 August 2020, Devolver Digital announced 2 million copies sold on Steam. During the first day of release, the servers for Fall Guys were unexpectedly overloaded due to popularity.

The game's popularity brought several brand collaborations for custom content. Shortly after release Mediatonic announced a fundraiser by which the brand that donated the most money to the charity SpecialEffect would have their custom skin featured in the game.

By 26 August 2020, more than 7 million copies of Fall Guys had been sold on Steam, and it was the most downloaded monthly PS Plus game of all time. By November 2020, the game had reached more than 10 million sales on Steam. According to firm Superdata the game's online revenue for PC in its first month was $185 million from 8.2 million players, making it the biggest launch on that platform since Overwatch by those metrics. Multiple outlets described the game's popularity as a "phenomenon". In December 2020, Mediatonic confirmed sales of more than 11 million copies on PC.

In June 2022, within two weeks of going free-to-play and its release on multiple consoles, Fall Guys' player count rose to over 50 million.

=== Awards ===
Award	Date of ceremony	Category	Result	Ref.
Golden Joystick Awards 2020	24 November 2020	Best Multiplayer Award	Won	
Golden Joystick Awards 2020	24 November 2020	Best Family Game	Won	
Golden Joystick Awards 2020	24 November 2020	Best Gaming Community	Nominated	
Golden Joystick Awards 2020	24 November 2020	PlayStation Game of the Year	Nominated	
Golden Joystick Awards 2020	24 November 2020	Ultimate Game of the Year	Nominated	
The Game Awards 2020	10 December 2020	Best Community Support	Won	
The Game Awards 2020	10 December 2020	Best Multiplayer Game	Nominated	
The Game Awards 2020	10 December 2020	Best Indie Game	Nominated	
PlayStation.Blog Game of the Year	18 December 2020	Best Independent Game-Platinum	Won	
PlayStation.Blog Game of the Year	18 December 2020	Best Multiplayer Game-Gold	Won	
17th British Academy Games Awards	25 March 2021	British Game	Nominated	
17th British Academy Games Awards	25 March 2021	Evolving Game	Nominated	
17th British Academy Games Awards	25 March 2021	Family	Nominated	
17th British Academy Games Awards	25 March 2021	Multiplayer	Nominated	
17th British Academy Games Awards	25 March 2021	Original Property	Nominated	
24th Annual D.I.C.E. Awards	22 April 2021	Online Game of the Year	Won	
24th Annual D.I.C.E. Awards	22 April 2021	Family Game of the Year	Nominated	
