= Nexway =

French software and service company

- Formerly: Téléchargement; Asknet
- Industry: E-Commerce, Digital Distribution
- Founded: 2002
- Founder: Gilles Ridel
- Headquarters: La Défense, Paris, France
- Website: www.nexway.com

Nexway is a French e-commerce provider for publishers and retailers of PC software and Android apps headquartered in Paris. It was founded in 2002 and acquired by asknet AG in 2019.

== History ==
The company was created in 2002 by Gilles Ridel under the name "Téléchargement", which translates to "Download" in French. The original headquarters were in Nanterre, France.

In 2006, the company had €7M in revenue and employed around 25 people. In June 2007, the company raised a €5 million euros Series A round of funding from its historical shareholders Turenne Capital Partenaires and XAnge Private Equity, and a new investor, CM-CIC Capital Privé. The company opened offices in Stockholm and Brussels the same year.

The company's revenue reached 32 million euros in 2008.

In November 2009, Nexway was ranked 13th in the French Deloitte Fast 50 with a growth of 1845% over the previous five years.

In July 2010, Nexway raised 14 million euros in Series B funding from Oddo Asset Management and the French Government's investment via CDC.

In 2011, the company opened a subsidiary in São Paulo, Brazil.

In 2016, the company moves its headquarters to the La Défense business district of Paris.

By March 2019, the German company asknet AG wholly acquired Nexway Group AG, the holding company of the French Nexway SAS. In September 2019, asknet AG renames to Nexway AG, and announces it will use the Nexway brand going forward.

=== Acquisitions ===
- Key Technology in Switzerland, 2008
- Boonty, 2009.
