= Faunasphere =

Inactive browser-based MMO game

- Faunasphere logo
- Developer: Big Fish Games
- Publisher: Big Fish Games
- Platform: Web browser
- Release: 2009
- Genre: Massively multiplayer online game
- Mode: Multiplayer

Faunasphere was a browser-based massively multiplayer online game developed and published by Big Fish Games centered around cleaning up a world filled with pollution via an animal avatar. Players took on the role of a caretaker who would raise and breed "fauna", which appeared as fantasy versions of common domestic animals. Faunasphere's gameplay was largely based on socializing, community building and building up one's own home base, or "faunasphere" rather than taking part in active combat with enemies or other players, with game sessions often taking only a few minutes, in contrast to other MMORPGs of the time. The game's servers were shut down in 2011 when its publisher deemed it "economically unviable" to continue supporting.

== Gameplay ==
In Faunasphere, players took on the role of "caretakers" terraforming a world of floating landmasses with toxic or polluted environments. To facilitate the terraforming effort, caretakers controlled colored animals termed "fauna" created through gene splicing. Fauna were directed to "zap" toxic waste, pollution, and toxic creatures created from the pollution in order to complete quests and earn the game's free currency, Lux. Players used different fauna to explore different areas, as each had its own gathering abilities. Lux and the premium currency Bux (purchased with real money) were used to buy items used to customize and upgrade one's own fauna and the faunasphere, a private island that friends could be invited to. Accumulating Lux also filled the "egg meter", which once full created an egg that can be hatched to create a new fauna to care for; the process was comparable to gaining experience points.

Goals in the game included participation in community missions, which required the use of the "totem" in a player's faunasphere to create one of 12 components to contribute to a community building machine. Once complete, community projects added features to the game world as a whole. Emphasis was placed on socialization and community building in Faunasphere, as many tasks were easier when done with others, and just visiting a faunasphere provided useful items and Lux from the totem, which was given to each player upon starting the game. Later areas of the game required the use of "gene food" to access inhospitable areas or to simply change a fauna's appearance, which was obtained through quests, crafting or purchasing it from vendors or other players.

== Release and post-release ==
=== Reveal and demo ===
Faunasphere was first revealed at PAX 2009 as a project of Toby Ragaini, lead designer of Asheron's Call and Director of Game Development at Big Fish Games. In contrast to Asheron's Call, which took place in a heroic fantasy world and focused on combat against monsters, Faunasphere was described as a "non-violent, adorable eco-friendly MMO" that "takes the most unique and compelling elements of [Webkinz, Neopets, and virtual worlds]" in which players were tasked with raising fauna and destroying pollution. A freemium model of pricing was integrated in the game from its launch, with players having the option to purchase extra fauna and upgrades to their personal faunasphere with "bux". Private invitations were distributed March 17, 2009, and the demo version was being advertised by July of the same year, though it would remain in closed beta until its launch in late 2009.

=== Launch ===
Faunasphere launched for free on web browsers in August 2009, with a cross-platform Facebook version made available February 2010. The game was aimed towards and attracted attention from a casual player group, offering shorter play sessions and a "kid-friendly atmosphere".

=== Server shutdown ===
On February 15, 2011, Big Fish Games announced that Faunasphere would be discontinued on March 15, 2011, citing an unsustainable use of resources to maintain the game. Players were refunded of all purchases made after January 14th of that year, and many were directed to a forum thread where caretakers could exchange contact information with those they had met through the game.

== Reception ==
As the first effort by Big Fish Games to develop an MMO, Faunasphere received attention upon release, but was not critically received or analyzed until after the server shutdown. The game was used as an ideal example of a virtual world that expanded the perspective of players and their connections to objects within the game similar to connections to real-life animals or "fauna", which exacerbated the emotional impact when those objects were taken away through the game's closing.

A thorough study of Faunasphere, its players, and the ramifications of its shutdown was published by Mia Consalvo and Jason Begy in 2015.
