= Who's That Flying?! =

2010 video game

- Developers: Mediatonic; Beeline Interactive (iOS)
- Publishers: Mediatonic (PSP); Kalypso Media (PC); Beeline Interactive (iOS)
- Platforms: PlayStation Portable, Microsoft Windows, iOS
- Release: PSP: NA: November 16, 2010; EU: November 17, 2010; Windows; January 31, 2011 iOS; April 28, 2011
- Genre: Shooter
- Mode: Single-player

Who's That Flying?! is a shooter game developed and published by Mediatonic for the PlayStation Portable in 2010.

== Gameplay ==
The game is a 2D side-scrolling shoot 'em up, in which the player controls the invincible Guardian of the Earth, a flying superhero tasked with defending terrestrial cities from waves of extraterrestrial enemies. Unlike traditional shooters where the player can be destroyed, the Guardian cannot die from enemy fire. Instead, the primary objective is to prevent enemies from passing by and inflicting damage on the cities, which have a finite health pool and are lost when too many enemies slip through. Players navigate horizontally and vertically across the playfield, shooting at swarms of small foes and larger enemies that can briefly incapacitate the Guardian, interrupting fire and allowing enemies to approach the city if not stopped. Destroying enemies builds a power meter that unlocks temporary weapon upgrades, such as enhanced rapid fire and powerful laser attacks. Each level concludes with a boss encounter, and additional modes include challenge stages with specific objectives and infinite mode levels for score-attack play.

The story is told retrospective, from the narrative point of the Guardian of the Earth, as he is standing trial before the representatives of the other planets at the Galactic Council of Space Justice.

The campaign contains 40 story levels set across multiple cities of the Earth, with animated cutscenes of the trial. There are 17 types of opponents, and 5 boss battles. In addition, there are 4 levels of infinity mode, and 24 levels in challenge mode.

The visuals of the game are in a cartoon style, with vivid colours and simple animations.

== Reception ==
Reception

Aggregate score
| Aggregator | Score | | |
| Aggregator | iOS | PC | PSP |
|---|---|---|---|
| Metacritic | 79/100 | 76/100 | 76/100 |

Review scores
| Publication | Score | | |
| Publication | iOS | PC | PSP |
|---|---|---|---|
| Destructoid | N/A | N/A | 9/10 |
| Edge | N/A | N/A | 7/10 |
| Eurogamer | N/A | N/A | 8/10 |
| GamePro | 4.5/5 | N/A | N/A |
| GamesTM | N/A | 7/10 | N/A |
| GameZone | N/A | 6.5/10 | N/A |
| IGN | 8/10 | 8/10 | 8/10 |
| PlayStation Official Magazine – UK | N/A | N/A | 6/10 |
| Pocket Gamer | 4/5 | N/A | N/A |
| TouchArcade | 4/5 | N/A | N/A |

Who’s That Flying?! received "generally favorable" reviews on all platforms according to the review aggregation website Metacritic. According to Metacritic, the game holds a "generally farorable" aggregate score, with many publications praising its hybrid gameplay and presentation. Critics highlighted the game’s charming personality and humour, with Eurogamer praising its engaging shoot ’em up mechanics, while IGN noted that it is a polished release, balancing the sometimes monotonous levels with the interesting challenge mode. Several reviewers commended its comic-styled visuals, engaging boss fights, and replay value through challenge and infinite modes, though some noted that the core campaign could feel short or repetitive to seasoned players. Overall, the title was regarded as an enjoyable and inventive take on the 2D shooter genre, especially given its modest scope and price point.
