= Flux Family Secrets: The Ripple Effect =

2009 video game

- Flux Family Secrets: The Ripple Effect logo
- Developer: Skunk Studios
- Publishers: Skunk Studios; Big Fish Games; Other various online game distributors
- Composer: Karney Music and Sound
- Engine: TGB
- Platform: Windows / Mac OS X
- Release: NA: April 11, 2009
- Genre: Puzzle
- Mode: Single-player

Flux Family Secrets: The Ripple Effect is a hidden object puzzle-adventure (HOPA) casual game developed by Skunk Studios. It is the first installment in the Flux Family Secrets series. The game is available at the Skunk Studios and Big Fish Games website, among other various online game distributors.

== Gameplay ==
In Flux Family Secrets: The Ripple Effect, the player plays as the main character, Jesse. Jesse is searching for the family she had never known and is brought to Flux mansion. To prove her lineage she is put through a test that uncovers a deep family secret. She is sent back in time in order to retrieve various historical artifacts, and is charged with fixing different aspects of history by replacing objects that have been scattered throughout time.

Along the way she learns of a betrayal that threatens her existence. With the help of an anonymous note, she searches for the pieces of a device that can help her stop this plan and bring her back safely.

There are ten chapters with three levels in each one. The puzzles are integrated in the goal of fixing a particular influence on history. For example, the player replaces various musical influences that Benjamin Franklin, Albert Einstein and Abbey Road Studios had contributed to history, and may also learn about the various characters and time periods. The player goes from any of the three time periods in each chapter, trying to find the pieces of five objects in each, and then assembles and replaces them in their proper location by solving puzzles and an array of mini games. Each mini game is customized to showcase a historical object from the characters.
