= SongPop =

Series of music trivia games released on mobile devices

- App Store icon
- Developers: FreshPlanet; Gameloft
- Platforms: iOS, Android, Windows, Facebook
- Release: SongPop 1 May 2012; SongPop 2 June 2015; SongPop 3 March 18, 2021; SongPop Party; April 2, 2021 (Apple Arcade)
- Genre: Music trivia game

SongPop is a series of head-to-head music trivia games developed by FreshPlanet and published by Gameloft. The first title in the series was released as a free app in May 2012 and was available for iOS, Android, Windows, and Facebook. By 2015, the app had been downloaded 100 million times.

A sequel titled SongPop 2 (now titled SongPop Classic), featuring over 100,000 songs and 1,000 curated playlists, was released in July 2015 and is free-to-play with in-app purchases. As of June 22, 2021 SongPop2 has over 200,000 songs on over 3,400 playlists. A third game, SongPop 3, was released on March 18, 2021. It includes features to play live one on one in real time, join teams, listen to the full playlists with Spotify and Apple Music integration, and many advanced customizations.

A fourth game and spin-off, SongPop Party, was released on April 2, 2021, as part of the Apple Arcade subscription service. Unlike other entries in the franchise, SongPop Party allows up to eight players to compete together through both online and local multiplayer. A version for Nintendo Switch and Xbox was released on September 22, 2022, marking the first game in the franchise to be released on console.

== History ==
SongPop 1 was shut down in November 2018, due to compatibility issues with iOS 12, with users being advised to move over to SongPop 2. FreshPlanet, the NYC–based startup who develop the SongPop franchise, were acquired by Gameloft the following month.

In 2022, SongPop 2 was renamed SongPop Classic and SongPop 3 became simply SongPop. The VIP option was also renamed SongPop Plus along with a significant increase in price (over double in some territories). A new "ad-free" subscription was later introduced at roughly the price point of the old VIP option.

== Gameplay ==
The game is played much like the popular TV show Name That Tune. After selecting a themed playlist, five songs are played. Players compete against each other to be the first to select the correct song title or artist from a choice of four. iTunes links are provided for each song. The faster a player guesses, the more points they get. Players can remove two songs by using "power ups." In SongPop 2, users can play alone for the first time, competing against a computer-controlled opponent.

== Critical reception ==
SongPop was awarded Best Facebook Game 2012, Social Gaming People's Voice Winner 2013, and Best Online Game 2013 by the British Academy Games Awards. Soon after its release, Mark Zuckerberg posted on Facebook "Song Pop is one of the most fun Facebook games I've played in a while." Some songs may include explicit lyrics. For this reason, iTunes rates the game 12+ and it is rated 16+ by Common Sense Media.

During the 16th Annual D.I.C.E. Awards, the Academy of Interactive Arts & Sciences nominated SongPop for "Web Based Game of the Year".
