= Awakening (video game series) =

Awakening (game series)
- Logo of Awakening: The Redleaf Forest
- Genres: Hidden object, puzzle, adventure, casual
- Developer: Boomzap Entertainment
- Publisher: Big Fish Games
- Platforms: Microsoft Windows, Mac OS X, iPhone, iPad
- First release: Awakening: The Dreamless Castle; February 14, 2010
- Latest release: Awakening: The Golden Age; November 1, 2014

Awakening is a casual hidden object puzzle adventure game series developed by Boomzap Entertainment and published by Big Fish Games. In order to progress through each game, the player must solve puzzles and find hidden objects. It is available on PC, Mac, iPhone and iPad platforms. The games are released in several languages with both Standard Editions and Collector's Editions, the latter including additional features.

As of 2014, the series consists of eight installments with connected storylines, all with positive reviews. The third game, Awakening: The Goblin Kingdom, has hailed the most praise, being awarded the Best Hidden Object Game of 2011 by Casual Gameplay. It has also topped Big Fish Games' top 10 PC Games chart for 42 days.

The sixth game, Awakening: The Redleaf Forest: Collector's Edition was released on May 31, 2014, to conclude the adventures of Queen Sophia, the main protagonist of the series. A free-to-play version called Awakening Kingdoms was released in the previous year. Shortly after Queen Sophia's story finale, a seventh installment Awakening: The Golden Age was released on November 1, 2014, to serve as a prequel to the series.

As of August 2014, games from the Awakening series have been downloaded over 17 million times on PC, Mac and mobile devices. It is considered "one of the oldest and most successful hidden object adventure franchises."

== Plot ==
Princess Sophia awakens in a mysterious castle after sleeping for one hundred years. She is separated from her family and is helped by her fairy friend to escape. Her goal is to find her people by travelling through different locations filled with puzzles and pick up valuable items along the way. She seeks the help from the magical creatures she encounters, including a wise Goblin king. Many obstacles come her way, such as dark foes and a curse cast on her exiled kingdom. She seeks the help of a powerful Enchantress that can undo the spell. Finally, she embarks on a journey to Redleaf Forest in order to defeat the enemy once and for all.

== Games ==
=== Awakening: The Dreamless Castle ===
Awakening: The Dreamless Castle was released as an exclusive game on Big Fish Games on February 14, 2010. Awakening is an adventure/hidden object PC (also available for Mac) casual game set in a light fantasy setting. It debuted as the #3 game on the Big Fish Games Top 100 downloads list, quickly rising to #1 for all formats. Awakening has also been released in German, Spanish, French, and Japanese - and has ranked at #1 in every language. According to a review by About.com, "Awakening: The Dreamless Castle is a superb example of a hidden object/adventure game." Awakening: The Dreamless Castle was released on the iPad on December 16, 2010 and on the iPhone on December 18, 2010.

=== Awakening: Moonfell Wood ===
Awakening: Moonfell Wood was released as an exclusive game on Big Fish Games on December 26, 2010. Awakening: Moonfell Wood picks up where Awakening: The Dreamless Castle leaves the main character, continuing the story of Princess Sophia. In a review by Gamezebo, the game was given a 3.5/5 rating, saying that "the story in Awakening: Moonfell Wood is intriguing, especially for those who have played the first game and would like to see where Sophia's journey takes her next."

Awakening: Moonfell Wood peaked at #2 and stayed within the top 10 PC games for 42 days. The Mac version also entered the top 10 Mac games chart, peaking at #3. The iOS port was released last May 26, 2011 for the iPad and July 7, 2011, for the iPhone.

=== Awakening: The Goblin Kingdom ===
Awakening: The Goblin Kingdom is the third game in the Awakening series, and the Collector's Edition was released as an exclusive game on Big Fish Games on August 25, 2011. The Standard Edition was released on October 1, 2011. Awakening: The Goblin Kingdom is also the first game by Boomzap to be released on both PC and Mac platforms simultaneously.

In Awakening: The Goblin Kingdom, Princess Sophia is led by the Fairy Queen to the Goblin Kingdom to ask the Goblin King about the whereabouts of her people. However, there are dark forces at work, waiting to spring a trap on the human princess.

Awakening: The Goblin Kingdom received positive reviews. Gamezebo gave the game a 4/5 rating, saying that "Awakening: The Goblin Kingdom is an overall better package even if only due to the increased puzzle variety that keeps the game feeling fresh... it's an instant recommendation that we all jump back into Princess Sophia's shoes." Jay Is Games also mentioned that "Awakening: The Goblin Kingdom is a magical enchanted ride and a worthy successor to the games that preceded it."

Awakening: The Goblin Kingdom is the longest chart-topper for Boomzap Entertainment, peaking at #1 (both for PC and Mac) and staying on Big Fish Games' top 10 PC Games chart for 42 days.

=== Awakening: The Skyward Castle ===
Awakening: The Skyward Castle is the fourth game in the Awakening series. The game is available in a Collector's Edition and a Standard Edition, both released in 2012 on Big Fish Games. In this game, Princess Sophia finally learned the whereabouts of her missing people and, with the aid of a winged unicorn and her pet pocket dragon, Sophia searches for a way to reach the floating castle and free her people. Casual Game Guides describe it as a "the perfect capstone to this beautiful story and amazing series." Players are excited to finally meet some humans in this series and thought that "this installment feels like a culmination of so much time and effort dedicated to the series". According to a review on Jayisgames, Awakening: The Skyward Castle is "one of the best adventure hybrids this year and a definite must play."

=== Awakening: The Sunhook Spire ===
Awakening: The Sunhook Spire: Collector's Edition is the fifth game in the Awakening series. It was released on Big Fish Games on August 17, 2013. The game sees Queen Sophia searching for an enchantress who lives in the titular Sunhook Spire. This enchantress is supposed to be powerful enough to release the curse that keeps Sophia's parents asleep, but first Sophia must contend with mercenaries blocking her path.

Awakening: The Sunhook Spire: Collector's Edition, like the first four games, received positive reviews. It is "incredibly interactive with nice, creative twists."

=== Awakening Kingdoms ===
Awakening Kingdoms is a free-to-play game set in Queen Sophia's kingdom. It was released for PC on December 18, 2013, exclusively on Big Fish Games. iPad and iPhone versions were eventually released on August 6, 2014. According to an article on The Sacramento Bee, it is a stand-alone game that is not meant to replace the adventure series, but "an endless game world that players can continuously explore and enjoy". New quests, characters, areas and minigames are added regularly through updates. Players can also save their game progress via cloud storage.

Unlike the earlier titles wherein Sophia is the main character, the player becomes the Steward to the Skyward Kingdom. After the war with Dreadmyre, the castle must be restored to its former glory. An update was released on February 14, 2014, revealing a new area as well as an in-game event.

According to Gamezebo, the main strength of Awakening Kingdoms "aside from its fun artwork — is its sheer variety of gameplay," giving it a rating of 4 out of 5 stars. Meanwhile, AllAboutCasualGame.com described it as "a fantastic addition to the franchise, it offers a nice variation of gameplay accompanied by great visuals and challenging quests." They rated it 4.5 out of 5 stars, naming it "one of the finest Hidden Object F2P in the market" that provides players with a "fun and addicting experience."

In May 2015 it was announced that no further updates would be made to the game even though it is unfinished.

=== Awakening: The Redleaf Forest ===
Awakening: The Redleaf Forest: Collector's Edition is the sixth game in main Awakening series. It was released on Big Fish Games on May 31, 2014, for PC and Mac, and May 6, 2015, for iPhone and iPad devices. As the series finale, it received much feedback from players and is considered "the most beautiful, most challenging, most creative and most fabulous Awakening game." It was also commended for being able to "reinvigorate the hidden object genre". On its first week, it has reached the #1 spot in both PC and Mac charts and stayed there for two weeks.

=== Awakening: The Golden Age ===
Awakening: The Golden Age Collector's Edition is the seventh game in the main series and the eighth in the entire Awakening franchise. It was released exclusively on PC on Big Fish Games on November 1, 2014. As the absolute last installment, several things have improved: "the action sequences are more exciting, the cutscenes are more epic and even the charming soundtracks, are even more charming". Despite being "a striking prequel" to a long-running series, AllAboutCasualGame.com considers it "a spectacular stand-alone game".
