= Boonty =

Supplier of digital distribution services of video games

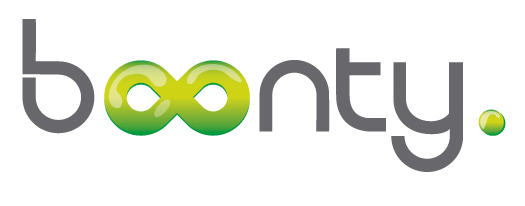
- Type: Private
- Industry: video game industry, Interactive entertainment
- Founded: 2001; 25 years ago
- Headquarters: Paris, France; Singapore; Tokyo, Japan; Los Angeles, USA,
- Website: uk.boonty.com

Boonty is a global supplier of digital distribution services for online and PC gaming whose technology platform and brand names were acquired by digital commerce provider Nexway in January 2009.

The company's white label casual game platform was utilized by over 100 million customers worldwide at the time of the Nexway acquisition, including Internet portals, ISPs, and mobile operators.

Boonty operated its own branded destination sites, Boonty.com (which is still operated by Nexway) in localized versions for the United States, France, UK, Belgium, Italy, Sweden, Norway, Denmark, Japan, Korea, Mexico, Austria, Australia, Taiwan, Hong Kong, Germany, Portugal, Finland, Singapore, The Netherlands, and Spain.

== History ==
- 2001: Boonty is founded by the brothers Mathieu and Romain Nouzareth.
- October 2006: Boonty announces the acquisition of Beijing-based casual game developer Gamehub.
- February 2007: Boonty launches Cafe.com for free multiplayer social casual games.
- May 2007: Boonty acquires the Chinese Game Studio GameHub and opens Boonty China.
- July 2007: BoontyBox is launched for Windows and Macintosh computers.
- October 2008: Boonty launches Facebook app iscool.
- December 2008: The company decides to sells its Digital Distribution Platform and the brand name Boonty to digital commerce provider Nexway.
- January 2009: Boonty is acquired by Nexway.
