= Big Fish Games =

American gaming company

Coordinates: 47.620941°N 122.361906°W

Big Fish Games, Inc.
- Type: Subsidiary
- Industry: Video games
- Founded: 2002; 24 years ago
- Founder: Paul Thelen
- Headquarters: Seattle, Washington, United States
- Number of employees: 350 (2020)
- Parent: BFG Entertainment (2025-) Aristocrat Leisure (2018-2025) Churchill Downs Inc. (2014-2018)
- Website: bigfishgames.com

Big Fish Games, Inc. is a casual game company based in Seattle with a regional office in Oakland, California, owned by BFG Entertainment. It is a developer and distributor of casual games for computers and mobile devices.

In 2016, the company was accused of knowingly deceiving customers into signing up for monthly purchases without informed consent. It was also the subject of a class action lawsuit over its app Big Fish Casino, resulting in a settlement of $155 million after a federal appeals court ruled that it constituted illegal online gambling.

== History ==
The company was founded in 2002. In 2009, it announced the opening of its European headquarters in Cork, Ireland. In July 2010, the company passed one billion game downloads from its online portal.

In August 2013, Big Fish announced the closing of its cloud-based games service, Vancouver studio and Cork offices. In 2014, the company was acquired by Churchill Downs Inc. in a deal valued at up to $885 million. In 2018, Churchill Downs sold Big Fish to Australian gambling machine manufacturer Aristocrat Leisure for $990 million. In September 2018, Big Fish cut 15% of its workforce, and in September 2020, it cut nearly 50% of its workforce.

By October 2025, Aristocrat Leisure sold Big Fish Games to a newly formed owner company, BFG Entertainment. Under BFG Entertainment's new leadership, Big Fish Games handed ownership of its mobile games Evermerge and Gummy Drop to publishers JetSynthesys and 7 Hits Games respectively, ended developer Elephant Games' support of free-to-play game Midnight Castle, terminated its contracts with hidden object game developer GrandMA Studios, and plans to open a new internal studio focused on hidden object games. In May 2026, BFG Entertainment was sued by GrandMA Studios for the alleged illegality of the termination of GrandMA's royalties, contracts, and distribution and licensing rights.

== Big Fish Studios ==
Big Fish Games has studios split between the Seattle office and Oakland office which develop games: Self Aware Games, Triton Studios, Epic Ventures and ARC Studios. Games developed by the various Big Fish studios include:

- Drawn series: Dark Flight, The Painted Tower, Trail of Shadows
- Fairway Solitaire HD
- Hidden Expedition series
- Mystery Case Files series
- Faunasphere

== Online games ==
The company entered browser gaming with its acquisition of the game website Ion Thunder in 2007; the service was re-branded as Atlantis after the acquisition. The service, which was revamped as Big Sea Games in 2009, was shut down in 2010 as part of the company's shift from traditional online games to social games on Facebook and other mobile apps.
