= List of Gears of War characters =

Characters in the Gears of War franchise

Members of Delta Squad in promotional artwork for Gears of War 3. From left: Augustus Cole, Samantha Byrne, Damon Baird, Marcus Fenix, Anya Stroud and Dominic Santiago.

The characters of the Gears of War franchise appear in a series of military science fiction video games created by Epic Games and subsequently developed by The Coalition, as well as associated novels and comics. Set on the planet Sera, the games follow soldiers of the Coalition of Ordered Governments (COG), civilians caught in its wars, and their adversaries. The original trilogy centers on Marcus Fenix and the other members of Delta Squad as humanity fights the subterranean Locust Horde and their mutated Lambent counterparts. Gears of War 4 introduces a younger generation, including Kait Diaz, Del Walker and Marcus's son JD Fenix, while exploring the aftermath of the Locust War and the continuing conflicts affecting humanity. Kait becomes the principal protagonist of Gears 5 as the COG prepare to confront the resurgent Locust, now reconstituted as the Swarm. The prequel Gears of War: E-Day returns to Marcus and his best friend Dominic Santiago as young men at the beginning of the Locust War.

This list includes major recurring characters and significant supporting characters that appear throughout the main series and selected spin-off titles. The cast combines returning protagonists with supporting characters introduced in individual games and spin-offs. Character development has included changes to the original squad's designs and backgrounds, the expansion of relationships through tie-in fiction, and a shift toward protagonists raised after the Locust War.

Critics have discussed the soldiers' comradeship, bereavement and relationship with military authority, while disagreeing over the effectiveness of the dialogue and the depiction of women and racial minorities. Later commentary has examined Kait's perspective on the COG and the consequences of its actions.

== Creation and development ==
Epic gave human and Locust combatants similar proportions so that they could share animation systems. According to lead level designer Jim Brown, several members of the original cast changed during production. Damon Baird initially had the professional athlete background later assigned to Cole, with David Beckham informing his appearance; Augustus Cole drew inspiration from Jamie Foxx's character in Any Given Sunday. Marcus's model and voice also changed between the game's announcement and release. The team considered allowing players to choose between a male Dominic and a female counterpart, Dominique. Brown said that the Locust General RAAM was added relatively late, leaving limited time to explain the final confrontation aboard a train.

Discussing the sequel's female characters, Cliff Bleszinski described Anya Stroud as strong-willed and maternal, and said that the team had avoided designing her around sexual appeal. Bleszinski wanted to give Dominic's search for his wife Maria Santiago greater prominence in the first game, but attributed its limited treatment to time constraints and Epic's lack of confidence in its storytelling. The relationship became a central subplot of Gears of War 2, providing an emotional counterpoint to the battlefield violence.

Karen Traviss, who wrote the early Gears of War novels and the script for Gears of War 3, worked on the books and game in parallel. She described the task as finding convincing responses for established characters within an existing story framework. The collapse of the COG in the third game removed the soldiers' institutional structure, making their squad an increasingly important substitute for family. Traviss understood Marcus's actions principally through his desire to protect individual people, rather than an ambition to become a hero. His discovery that Adam was alive offered another chance to save his father while complicating his earlier grief and guilt. Gears of War: Judgment shifted attention to Baird and Cole earlier in their military careers, alongside the new squad members Sofia Hendrik and Garron Paduk. Their backgrounds placed a military cadet and a former enemy soldier within the same unit.

For Gears of War 4, The Coalition introduced JD, Kait and Del as the central trio. Laura Bailey described Kait's unfamiliarity with COG technology as a way for new players to encounter the setting through her. Eugene Byrd said that his friendship with Liam McIntyre helped their performances as Del and JD. Studio head Rod Fergusson described Kait's leading role in Gears 5 as a continuation of the previous game's story. Comparing Gears of War 4 to Mad Max: Fury Road, he likened JD to Max and Kait to Furiosa: the playable lead accompanied another character whose personal story drove the journey, and making Kait the next game's protagonist followed from that distinction.

For Gears of War: E-Day, The Coalition returned to younger versions of Marcus and Dom, presenting their relationship before the events of the first game. Creative director Matt Searcy emphasized shared burdens, trust and loyalty, while brand director Nicole Fawcette described the pair as more vulnerable than their later incarnations. The developers also redesigned the Locust Drone to make an individual encounter threatening to characters experiencing the invasion for the first time.

== Coalition of Ordered Governments ==
=== Soldiers and support characters ===
The COG's recurring military characters include members of Delta Squad, whose central soldiers in the first three games are Marcus Fenix, Dominic Santiago, Augustus Cole and Damon Baird, with Anya Stroud initially providing communications support. JD Fenix, Kait Diaz and Del Walker form a later incarnation of the squad. Gears Tactics, a prequel spin-off, follows Gabe Diaz as he and Alpha Squad pursue the Locust scientist Ukkon.

==== Marcus Fenix ====
Marcus Fenix, voiced by John DiMaggio, is the principal playable character of the original trilogy. A veteran COG soldier, he is imprisoned after abandoning his post to try to save his father, Adam. Dom frees him during a Locust attack at the beginning of Gears of War, and Marcus returns to service, taking command of Delta Squad after the death of Minh Young Kim. His leadership brings him into conflict with military authority, while his closest relationships are with his squad and surviving family.

Marcus leads the missions against the Locust in Gears of War 2 and searches for Adam in Gears of War 3. The latter ends with the deaths of Dom and Adam and Marcus's killing of Queen Myrrah. After the war, Marcus marries Anya and becomes JD's father. In Gears of War 4, he is a widower living in retirement when JD and his companions seek his help against the Swarm. He subsequently fights alongside the younger generation, although his relationship with JD is strained.

A younger Marcus is the protagonist of Gears of War: E-Day, a prequel set fourteen years before the first game.

==== Dominic Santiago ====
Dominic "Dom" Santiago, voiced by Carlos Ferro, is Marcus's closest friend and the second player's character in the first two games. He secures Marcus's release from prison and remains his principal companion throughout the original trilogy. Alongside his military duties, Dom searches for his wife, Maria, who disappeared after the deaths of their children. His contacts among the Stranded, civilians living outside COG protection, help the squad obtain assistance.

In Gears of War 2, Dom discovers Maria in Locust captivity, severely injured and unable to respond to him, and kills her to end her suffering. He remains distressed by her death in Gears of War 3. When the squad is trapped by enemy forces, he sacrifices himself by driving a fuel tanker into their position, allowing the others to escape.

Gears of War: E-Day returns to Dom and Marcus's relationship as veterans of the Pendulum Wars facing the first Locust invasion.

==== Augustus Cole ====
Augustus "Cole Train" Cole, voiced by Lester Speight, is a former star of thrashball, a fictional contact sport. His enthusiasm and theatrical manner contrast with the other soldiers' more restrained or cynical personalities. He joins Marcus and Dom after his original squad suffers heavy casualties in Gears of War, and frequently serves alongside Baird. Gears of War 3 makes Cole playable during a return to his ruined hometown, including the stadium where he played before the war. Gears of War: Judgment depicts his earlier service under Baird in Kilo Squad. He returns as a veteran assisting the protagonists in Gears of War 4 and Gears 5.

==== Damon Baird ====
Damon Baird, voiced by Fred Tatasciore, is Delta Squad's mechanically skilled and frequently sarcastic soldier. He initially resents Marcus's appointment as squad leader, but becomes one of his regular companions. His knowledge of machinery and Locust behavior helps the group repair vehicles, use unfamiliar equipment and interpret enemy activity.

Gears of War: Judgment presents Baird as a lieutenant commanding Kilo Squad early in the Locust War. He is tried for disobeying Colonel Loomis's orders and deploying a Lightmass missile against Karn, and is demoted despite helping save Halvo Bay. After the war, he establishes DB Industries, whose automated DeeBee machines become central to COG reconstruction and security. In Gears of War 4 and Gears 5, he supports Marcus and the younger soldiers with equipment and engineering expertise. Samantha Byrne is his partner.

==== Anya Stroud ====
Anya Stroud, voiced by Nan McNamara, is the COG officer who coordinates Delta Squad's missions in the first two games. She provides intelligence and communications support and develops a close relationship with Marcus. Following the COG's collapse, she becomes a frontline soldier in Gears of War 3. After the Locust War, she marries Marcus, gives birth to JD and becomes the rebuilt COG's first minister. She has died before the events of Gears of War 4; her family and successor, Jinn, refer to her role in the postwar government.

Anya appears in the tie-in novels which explore her long relationship with Marcus and Anya's transformation from a comms officer to a frontline soldier. Anya was the daughter of famed war hero Major Helena Stroud who died in the Battle of Aspho Fields, the same battle that Dom's brother Carlos died in. Anya met Marcus in the aftermath and they were implied to have spent the night together. It's later revealed that the two were in a long-term romantic relationship until Marcus went to prison, but it had to be kept a secret as Anya was an officer while Marcus was enlisted. However, the relationship was an open secret.

In Gears of War: E-Day, Marcus makes contact with Anya during the chaos of Emergence Day and she reveals the extent of the invasion by the Locust. Anya directs Bravo Squad to safe harbor for the survivors of Kalona where she will have a convoy waiting to escort them and regretfully tells Dom that his entire family is most likely dead.

==== Samantha Byrne ====
Samantha "Sam" Byrne, voiced by Claudia Black, joins the playable ensemble in Gears of War 3. She serves alongside Cole and Baird, taking part in the search for supplies and the subsequent effort to reach Adam Fenix. Her exchanges with Baird are frequently antagonistic and humorous. She and Baird become a couple after the war. In Gears of War 4 and Gears 5, she assists the protagonists as a helicopter pilot.

==== Jace Stratton ====
Jayson "Jace" Stratton is a COG soldier who had a substantial role in the Gears of War comics before joining the playable cast of Gears of War 3. Drake was initially announced as his voice actor, but Michael B. Jordan voices him in the released game. Jace accompanies Cole, Baird and Sam during the search for supplies near Hanover, and later takes part in the campaign against the Locust. The prequel campaign RAAM's Shadow depicts him as a young civilian caught in the evacuation of Ilima, where he encounters the soldiers of Zeta-Six.

==== Jack ====
Jack is the name of the hovering support robots that accompany the protagonists. In the original trilogy, Jack opens sealed doors, interfaces with computers and helps the squad complete technical objectives. Baird supplies an upgraded version in Gears 5. This Jack can be controlled by a third cooperative player, and has abilities that scan for enemies, protect allies, disable opponents and temporarily take control of hostile units.

==== JD Fenix ====
James Dominic "JD" Fenix, voiced by Liam McIntyre, is Marcus and Anya's son and the principal playable character of Gears of War 4. He and his friend Del desert the COG and join an Outsider community. After the Swarm abducts its inhabitants, JD seeks Marcus's help and joins Kait and Del in trying to recover the prisoners. His decision to become a soldier despite Marcus's objections contributes to their difficult relationship.

In Gears 5, JD has returned to the COG and commands the younger Delta Squad. The revelation that he ordered soldiers to fire on protesters damages his relationships with Del and Kait. His attempt to use the Hammer of Dawn during a civilian evacuation causes further deaths and leaves him seriously injured. He later rejoins Kait's mission and tries to repair their friendship.

==== Kait Diaz ====
Kait Diaz, voiced by Laura Bailey, is an Outsider raised by Reyna Diaz. Her knowledge of wilderness survival contrasts with her initial unfamiliarity with COG technology. The search for her abducted mother drives Gears of War 4. When the group finds Reyna physically connected to the Swarm, Kait grants her request to sever the connection, causing her death. Reyna leaves her a pendant bearing the Locust emblem.

Kait becomes the principal playable character of Gears 5. Disturbing visions and an involuntary connection to the Swarm lead her and Del to investigate New Hope and another research facility. There she discovers her descent from Myrrah and learns how the Locust were created. She rejects the role of queen and works to break the connection. Near the end of the game, the revived Reyna captures JD and Del. The player, as Kait, chooses which man to rescue, and Reyna kills the other.

==== Del Walker ====
Delmont "Del" Walker, voiced by Eugene Byrd, is JD's longtime friend and fellow COG deserter in Gears of War 4. The two met at boarding school, and Del accompanies JD when he leaves the military for an Outsider settlement. Del takes part in the rescue mission against the Swarm and subsequently rejoins the COG. In Gears 5, his relationship with JD deteriorates after he learns the truth about the shooting of protesters. He accompanies Kait on her investigation despite orders to return to duty, providing technical assistance and personal support.

==== Fahz Chutani ====
Fahz Chutani, voiced by Rahul Kohli, is a COG soldier and former colleague of JD and Del introduced in Gears 5. His abrasive manner initially places him at odds with the other protagonists. He reveals that JD ordered the shooting of protesters during their earlier service, contradicting the account Del had understood. Fahz later accompanies JD to assist Kait and Del, and fights alongside them in the defense of New Ephyra.

==== Victor Hoffman ====
Victor Hoffman, voiced by Jamie Alcroft, is a senior COG officer who directs military operations during the original trilogy. Initially hostile to Marcus over his desertion, he later relies on Delta Squad for major missions against the Locust. After the COG's collapse, he commands the survivors at Anvil Gate with Bernie Mataki. Traviss's novel Anvil Gate develops his earlier command of the fortress and the difficult decisions made during its siege. In Gears 5: Hivebusters, the retired Hoffman sponsors Scorpio Squad's experimental missions against Swarm hives.

==== Minh Young Kim ====
Lieutenant Minh Young Kim, voiced by Robin Atkin Downes, commands Delta Squad at the beginning of Gears of War. He leads the mission to recover information about the Locust's tunnels, but RAAM kills him during an ambush, after which Marcus takes command. Kim is also a playable member of Zeta-Six in RAAM's Shadow, set before the first game's main campaign, when the squad attempts to evacuate Ilima.

==== Tai Kaliso ====
Tai Kaliso, voiced by Fred Tatasciore, is a COG soldier from the South Islands whose dialogue frequently draws on his spiritual beliefs. He serves with the assault force in Gears of War 2 and is captured while resisting a Locust attack. Marcus's squad later finds him badly injured aboard a prison barge. After receiving a weapon, Tai kills himself. RAAM's Shadow depicts his earlier service in Zeta-Six. In Gears of War: E-Day, Tai is one of the Gears defending Kalona on Emergence Day.

==== Dizzy Wallin ====
Dizzy Wallin, voiced by Peter Jason, is a former Stranded civilian who joins the COG in exchange for protection for his family. In Gears of War 2, he drives the assault derrick Betty, which transports soldiers to the underground offensive. His skills as a mechanic and driver remain useful in Gears of War 3, when he helps the protagonists obtain and repair a submarine for the journey to Azura. Bleszinski described Dizzy as a supporting character intended to provide comic relief.

==== Bernie Mataki ====
Bernadette "Bernie" Mataki, voiced by Tess Masters, is an experienced soldier and sniper from the South Islands. In Gears of War 3, she serves with Hoffman at Anvil Gate, defending the settlement and helping Marcus's squad continue its search for Adam. She is familiar with the older soldiers and is particularly close to Hoffman.

The tie-in novels further explore her history, revealing that Bernie had a romantic relationship with Hoffman before he became an officer and had to break it off. The two rekindle this relationship while the COG is living on Vectes. Bernie also fought alongside Marcus in the Battle of Aspho Fields and rejoined the COG between the first two games and eventually reveals a traumatic past that occurred while Bernie was crossing the planet to return to the COG. Alongside Marcus, Bernie is one of only two people who know the truth about what happened to Carlos Santiago as they kept it a secret from everyone. At Dom's request, Bernie finally tells him the truth about his brother's death.

In Gears 5: Hivebusters, the wheelchair bound Hoffman is living in Bernie's old farm on the island of Galangi, using it as a base for his Hivebuster operation. A picture of Hoffman and Bernie together sits on Hoffman's desk, but there's no sign of Bernie herself or any mention of where she might be.

In Gears of War: E-Day, Bernie is briefly mentioned when Marcus tells Mags Carter the truth about what happened to Carlos.

==== Michael Barrick and Alicia Valera ====
Michael Barrick and Alicia Valera, voiced by Rick Wasserman and Laura Bailey, respectively, are playable members of Zeta-Six in RAAM's Shadow. Barrick serves with Kim and Tai in the effort to evacuate Ilima, where the squad encounters the young Jace Stratton. Valera is killed by RAAM during the operation. Their campaign presents the Locust advance from the perspective of soldiers and civilians outside the original Delta Squad.

In the tie-in comics, Barrick suffers from Rustlung and later dies in a battle against the Locust, sacrificing himself to hold them off.

In Gears 5, one of the collectibles is Barrick's lighter which Jace Stratton kept. If the lighter is placed at the Tomb of the Unknown, Barrick's voice can be heard for a second.

==== Garron Paduk ====
Garron Paduk, voiced by Chris Cox, is a former soldier of the Union of Independent Republics, the COG's opponent in the earlier Pendulum Wars. He joins Kilo Squad in Gears of War: Judgment while retaining his hostility toward COG institutions. He supports Baird's decision to use the Lightmass missile and later becomes romantically involved with Sofia. In the game's Aftermath campaign, Sofia's abduction has left him embittered and estranged from his former comrades. He returns in Gears 5 as the leader of an independent settlement in the ruins of Vasgar and helps Kait's group restore the Hammer of Dawn.

==== Sofia Hendrik ====
Sofia Hendrik, voiced by Ali Hillis, is an Onyx Guard cadet serving in Kilo Squad in Gears of War: Judgment. A former war correspondent, she places greater trust in military procedure than Baird or Paduk. Although she objects to the unauthorized use of the Lightmass missile, she participates in the operation and stands trial with the squad. Her relationship with Paduk and subsequent disappearance are discussed in Aftermath.

==== Ezra Loomis ====
Colonel Ezra Loomis, voiced by Jim Cummings, is the officer prosecuting Kilo Squad in Gears of War: Judgment. He demands obedience to the chain of command and treats Baird's unauthorized deployment of the Lightmass missile as a capital offense. When Karn interrupts the court-martial, Loomis joins the fighting. After Kilo Squad defeats Karn, he spares its members from execution but demotes Baird to private. In the Aftermath campaign, it's revealed that Loomis eventually died defending the city and a statue proclaiming him to be the "Hero of Halvo Bay" was erected.

==== Gabe Diaz ====
Gabriel "Gabe" Diaz, voiced by Noshir Dalal, is the principal protagonist of Gears Tactics and Kait's father. A veteran soldier working in a motor pool, he is ordered by Prescott to hunt the Locust scientist Ukkon. He builds a force from surviving soldiers and Stranded recruits, and increasingly resists the COG's willingness to sacrifice people to achieve its objectives. His alliance with the younger Reyna links the prequel's story to Kait's family.

In the novel Gears of War: Bloodlines, it's revealed that Gabe died of Rustlung when Kait was little. Kait searches through old COG files for information about her father and Colonel Victor Hoffman implies that he has knowledge of Gabe's mission to kill Ukkon, but he feels that it's better left forgotten. In flashbacks, Gabe is a Lieutenant Colonel near the end of the Pendulum Wars. However, the loss of his brother Wyatt, and a growing disillusionment with the war and being a leader causes Gabe to consider quitting the COG. Instead, Gabe gets himself demoted to Sergeant and the motor pool so that he can still contribute, a job that Gabe still holds when he's recruited to kill Ukkon.

==== Sid Redburn ====
Sid Redburn, voiced by Bruce Thomas, is a veteran soldier assigned to accompany Gabe in Gears Tactics. His earlier service as a guard at New Hope gives him knowledge of the experiments behind the Locust's creation. Initially withholding this history, he eventually reveals information that helps the squad understand Ukkon and develop a way to defeat him.

Sid is briefly mentioned in a collectible in Gears 5 where it's revealed that he had tried to expose the experiments at New Hope, but he was caught and fired.

==== Scorpio Squad ====
Scorpio Squad consists of Lahni, Keegan and Mac, the three protagonists of Gears 5's Escape mode and the Hivebusters expansion. Under Hoffman's direction, they test a method of destroying Swarm hives from within. The Hivebusters expansion follows the group's first mission in the Galangi islands. Their combat abilities differ: Lahni uses an electrically charged knife, Keegan replenishes ammunition, and Mac projects a protective barrier.

Lahni Kaliso, voiced by Sumalee Montano, is a commando from the South Islands. Her separation from her homeland and military service form part of her background in Hivebusters. During the mission, she encounters the traditions and mythology of her Pahanu culture, recovering knowledge from which she had become disconnected.

Keegan, voiced by Dave Fennoy, is a former Onyx Guard who becomes the squad's senior military figure. He served at Azura during the Locust War and carries guilt over his survival and the deaths of his comrades. In Hivebusters, he initially clashes with the inexperienced Mac but comes to rely on both of his teammates.

Mac, voiced by Trevor Devall, is a former delivery driver who becomes a Hivebuster after losing his son to the Swarm. Unlike his teammates, he has no comparable military background. His recklessness and grief complicate the squad's first mission, during which he begins to form a bond with Lahni and Keegan.

Hana Cole, Augustus Cole's daughter, supports Scorpio Squad as a researcher. Working with Hoffman, she develops the venom-based method used to destroy Swarm hives and guides the team's investigation of its potential source.

==== Mags Carter ====
Mags Carter, portrayed by Elizabeth Ludlow, is a playable character announced for Gears of War: E-Day. A former COG soldier employed at Kalona's Imulsion refinery, she joins Marcus, Dom and Lucas Reyes in Bravo Squad during the Locust invasion.

==== Lucas Reyes ====
Lucas Reyes, portrayed by Jake Ryan Lozano, is a playable character announced for Gears of War: E-Day. He is a young COG cadet and communications officer without frontline experience who joins Marcus, Dom and Mags Carter in Bravo Squad.

==== Gill Gettner ====
Gill Gettner, portrayed by Jen Oleksiuk, is a major supporting character. First appearing in the tie-in novels and comics, Gettner is one of the COG's most prominent King Raven pilots, flying KR-80 and often providing aerial support to Delta Squad. Although unseen, she is the pilot of the helicopter that flew Marcus Fenix away from prison at the start of Gears of War.

In Gears of War: E-Day, Gettner is assigned to fly Bravo Squad during the battle for Kalona on Emergence Day. During a massive Locust attack, Bravo escapes in KR-80, but Gettner crashes in a forest and her co-pilot is killed. While Bravo seeks another way back to base, Gettner chooses to remain behind to try to repair her Raven. Gettner later unexpectedly returns to rescue Bravo when they get cornered and ferries them to the Resolute and a bridge that needs to be destroyed. It's later revealed that Gettner and Tai Kaliso had rescued the presumed dead Commander Zander "Zee" Carmine.

==== Quentin Michaelson ====
Captain Quentin Michaelson, portrayed by Peter Jason in Gears of War 3 and Charles Zuckermann, in Gears of War: E-Day, is a prominent COG naval officer.

Michaelson first appears in the tie-in novels, serving as the commanding officer of the Pomeroy during the Battle of Aspho Fields. During the time between Gears of War 2 and Gears of War 3, Michaelson serves as the head of the COG Navy and one of the three leaders of the COG alongside Victor Hoffman and Richard Prescott.

In Gears of War 3, Michaelson is killed in the Lambent attack at the beginning of the game.

In Gears of War: E-Day, Michaelson commands the flotilla that's present in Kalona on Emergence Day. When the Locust sink his fleet, Michaelson survives and takes command of the COG survivors as the highest ranking officer remaining after the death of Colonel Elias Trench. Michaelson coordinates the evacuation of thousands of survivors on the CNV Resolute.

=== Political leaders and scientists ===
==== Richard Prescott ====
Richard Prescott is the COG chairman during the Locust War. He is voiced by Charles Cioffi in Gears of War 2 and Dwight Schultz in Gears of War 3. He authorizes the offensive into the Locust's underground territory in the second game. By the third game, he has abandoned the COG, whose remaining forces no longer trust him. He returns carrying a message from Adam Fenix and dies during an attack on the survivors' ship. His concealment of Adam at the protected research settlement of Azura becomes central to Marcus's final campaign. He also appears in Gears Tactics, ordering Gabe Diaz and Sid Redburn to eliminate Ukkon.

==== Mina Jinn ====
Mina Jinn, voiced by Angel Desai, is the COG's first minister in Gears of War 4 and Gears 5. She succeeds Anya and oversees a government that relies heavily on automated labor, surveillance and robotic security forces. Frequently addressing others through DeeBee proxies, she initially suspects the Outsiders of abducting COG citizens. In Gears 5, she directs the response to the Swarm and seeks to exploit Kait's connection to it, bringing her into conflict with Kait and the older Delta Squad members.

==== Adam Fenix ====
Adam Fenix, voiced by Peter Renaday, is Marcus's father, a former soldier and weapons scientist. Marcus believes that Adam died during the Locust assault in which he abandoned his post to reach him. Gears of War 3 reveals that Prescott secretly confined Adam on Azura to continue his research. Adam had been in contact with Myrrah and sought a solution to the spread of Imulsion, the organism responsible for the Lambent. His countermeasure destroys the Lambent and the exposed Locust but also kills him, because he infected himself while studying Imulsion's effects.

==== Niles Samson ====
Niles Samson, voiced by Robin Atkin Downes, is the scientist responsible for the research that produces the Sires and ultimately the Locust. His work begins with efforts to treat the effects of Imulsion exposure on miners and develops into experiments on human subjects. In Gears of War 2, Marcus and Dom encounter an artificial intelligence based on Niles at the abandoned New Hope research facility. Another version of the system appears in Gears 5, guiding Kait through the history of the experiments and attempting to make her the Swarm's queen.

=== Carmine family ===
The Carmine family provides several supporting soldiers across the series. Anthony Carmine serves in Delta Squad early in Gears of War and is killed by a sniper while examining his malfunctioning weapon. His younger brother Benjamin is an inexperienced soldier assigned to Marcus's squad in Gears of War 2. Separated from the others during their evacuation, he is swallowed by the Riftworm and dies before the squad can rescue him.

Their older brother Clayton is an experienced, physically imposing soldier in Gears of War 3. He survives that game's campaign and returns in Gears 5. Before the release of Gears of War 3, Epic allowed fans to vote on Clayton's survival by purchasing avatar clothing on Xbox Live or shirts at San Diego Comic-Con. The proceeds went to the charity Child's Play.

Gary Carmine is a guard at the Outsider settlement attacked in Gears of War 4. Lizzie Carmine, Clayton's niece, is a COG driver in Gears 5 who helps evacuate civilians before being killed in an uncontrolled Hammer of Dawn strike. Michael Gough voices Anthony, Benjamin, Clayton and Gary; Sarah Elmaleh voices Lizzie.

In Gears of War: E-Day, Commander Zander "Zee" Carmine appears, also played by Michael Gough. Zee is implied to be the father of the Carmine brothers and he survives the events of the game.

== Union of Independent Republics ==
=== Miran Trescu ===
Commander Miran Trescu, portrayed by Carlos Ferro in Gears of War 3, is the leader of the remnants of the UIR country the Republic of Gorasnya.

In the tie-in comics and novels, Trescu is the commanding officer of the Gorasni sub Zephyr. After the deployment of the Hammer of Dawn, Trescu does not accept the armistice with the COG and promises his dying father that he will keep fighting. Subsequently, Gorasnya continues a guerilla war against the COG. When Gorasnya falls to the Locust on Emergence Day, Trescu leads thousands of survivors for the next fifteen years, eventually making peace with the COG for mutual survival after they move to Vectes. Despite his extreme and often disturbing ways of dealing with insurgents, Trescu proves himself to be trustworthy. When the COG disbands and the island is abandoned, Trescu promises not to forget their kindness and considers the COG to be his friends rather than his enemies.

In Gears of War 3, Trescu and the Gorasni provide support during the final battle with the Locust and the Lambent.

In Gears of War: Judgment, Trescu is indirectly mentioned by Baird when he tells former UIR Major Garron Paduk that he, Cole and Clayton Carmine are going to contact their Gorasni friends for help. Paduk, who was unaware that any other Gorasni had survived, is surprised by this, but declines Baird's offer to pass on messages for any of Paduk's friends who may be amongst Trescu's people.

In Gears 5, collectibles reveal that Trescu had incited Paduk and his forces to rebellion at the end of the Pendulum Wars in an attempt to launch the UIR's Hammer of Dawn satellites and keep the war going. However, the rebellion failed when the COG blew up the rebels with a Lightmass Missile, leaving Paduk with permanent burn scars. Done by the COG with the approval of the overall UIR leader, this act ensured the armistice and the end of the Pendulum Wars rather than a continuing escalation.

== Stranded, Outsiders and other civilians ==
The Stranded are civilians living outside COG protection during the Locust War. The postwar Outsiders likewise maintain communities beyond the rebuilt government's settlements. Several characters move between these communities and military service.

=== Maria Santiago ===
Maria Santiago is Dom's wife. The deaths of their two children during the Locust invasion precede her disappearance, leaving Dom to search for her while fighting the war. In Gears of War 2, he and Marcus trace her to a Locust prison camp. Dom initially imagines a reunion with a healthy Maria before recognizing her emaciation and injuries. Unable to obtain a response from her, he shoots her. Her loss continues to shape Dom's behavior in the third game.

=== Aaron Griffin ===
Aaron Griffin, voiced by Ice-T, is an industrialist who controls a fortified enclave in the ruined city of Char in Gears of War 3. He blames the COG for the destruction inflicted by its Hammer of Dawn strikes. When Marcus's group needs fuel, Griffin holds Dizzy hostage to force them to retrieve a supply from another facility. A subsequent attack destroys Griffin's position, and he angrily confronts Marcus before leaving.

=== Reyna Diaz ===
Reyna Diaz, voiced by Justina Machado in Gears of War 4 and Gears 5, leads the Outsider community in which Kait, JD and Del live. She is kidnapped during the Swarm's attack and becomes physically integrated into its underground network. Kait finds her and ends her life at her request. Gears 5 reveals that Reyna is Myrrah's daughter. Her body returns as the Swarm's queen and confronts Kait and her companions during the assault on New Ephyra. A younger Reyna appears in Gears Tactics, joining Gabe's group in its pursuit of Ukkon.

=== Oscar Diaz ===
Oscar Diaz is Kait's uncle and a veteran of the Locust War. In Gears of War 4, he lives with the Outsiders and accompanies Kait, JD and Del on a raid for supplies. He distrusts the former COG soldiers and is critical of their desertion. The Swarm abducts him during the attack on the settlement, but he escapes from the creature holding him. He leads another Outsider settlement in Gears 5, where a Swarm attack and Kait's involuntary connection to the creatures result in his death.

=== Mikayla Dorn ===
Mikayla Dorn, voiced by Debra Wilson, is a Stranded leader and sniper in Gears Tactics. She joins Gabe's force after a Locust attack and helps pursue Ukkon. Her distrust of the COG reflects the destruction caused by its actions against the Locust, creating tension within a squad that depends on cooperation between soldiers and civilians.

== Locust Horde and Swarm ==
The Locust Horde is led by Queen Myrrah and fights both the COG and the Imulsion-infected Lambent during the Locust War. The Swarm emerges after the Locust War and abducts humans to expand its forces. Its queen in Gears 5 is the revived Reyna Diaz, possessed by the consciousness of Queen Myrrah, whose earlier life as an Outsider leader is described above.

=== Myrrah ===
Queen Myrrah, voiced by Carolyn Seymour, is the ruler of the Locust Horde. Initially heard as a disembodied voice, she appears in person in Gears of War 2, where she directs the Locust's war against humanity while her forces also fight the Lambent underground. In Gears of War 3, she seeks to prevent Adam Fenix from activating his countermeasure because it will kill the Locust as well as the Lambent. After the device is activated, Marcus kills her with Dom's knife.

Gears 5 reveals that Myrrah was a human subject in Niles Samson's experiments and that her unusual biology was essential to the Locust's creation. She is Reyna's mother and Kait's grandmother, making her family history central to Kait's connection with the Swarm.

=== RAAM ===
General RAAM, voiced by Dee Bradley Baker, is the principal Locust antagonist of Gears of War. He kills Kim during the attack on Delta Squad and confronts Marcus and Dom aboard the train carrying the Lightmass bomb. He uses swarms of flying creatures called Kryll as protection before the protagonists defeat him. RAAM's Shadow makes him playable during the Locust assault on Ilima, alternating his offensive with Zeta-Six's efforts to evacuate the city.

=== Skorge ===
Skorge is a Locust commander and leader of the Kantus priests in Gears of War 2. Armed with a double-ended chainsaw staff, he directs the use of the Riftworm to destroy human settlements. He confronts Marcus and Dom in the Locust stronghold and pursues their escape on a flying Hydra, dying when they bring down his mount.

=== Karn ===
General Karn is the Locust commander attacking Halvo Bay in Gears of War: Judgment. He fights from the back of a large creature called Shibboleth. His assault prompts Baird and Kilo Squad to use a Lightmass missile despite Loomis's prohibition. Karn survives the strike and attacks during the squad's court-martial, forcing the soldiers to resume the battle and kill him.

=== Ukkon ===
Ukkon, voiced by Jason Spisak, is the Locust scientist hunted by Gabe Diaz and his squad in Gears Tactics. He experiments on human captives and creates creatures used as weapons by the Horde. His ability to regenerate allows him to survive attacks that would otherwise kill him. Gabe' squad develops a means of suppressing that ability, and Reyna ultimately kills him.

=== The Speaker ===
The Speaker is a Swarm leader in Gears of War 4 who communicates with the protagonists during their search for the abducted Outsiders. He acts as a spokesman for the creatures' collective consciousness and confronts the group before their final attempt to reach Reyna.

== Reception and analysis ==
=== Protagonists ===
Critical response to the series' playable protagonists has varied considerably. Marcus Fenix, the protagonist of the original trilogy, developed the most longstanding recognition among the cast and became a point of comparison for lead characters in later games. In a 2010 Game Informer readers' poll of characters introduced during the preceding decade, Marcus placed tenth, while Dominic Santiago placed twenty-fifth. Game Informer had previously selected Marcus for a feature on memorable character design, praising the combination of his exaggerated physique, scars and facial features with an appearance that suggested intelligence and a history shaped by warfare. GamesRadar+ later described the original Gears of War as helping establish one of Xbox's most recognizable shooter series through Marcus and the exaggerated action-film archetypes surrounding him, while observing that his return as an older supporting character in Gears of War 4 allowed qualities that once defined him as a hardened action hero to be recontextualized for comedy.

Damon Baird received a divisive response towards his starring role in Gears of War: Judgment, largely because of his abrasive personality that distinguished him from Marcus in previous games. James Stephanie Sterling of Destructoid described the sarcastic and perpetually complaining Baird as arguably the series' best character, although Sterling felt the game ultimately did little of interest with his past. By contrast, GamesBeat characterized Baird's intelligence and sarcasm as having frequently manifested as whining, arrogance and comic relief in the earlier games. GamesRadar+ considered Baird and Cole enjoyable leads in Judgment but criticized the game for failing to reproduce the playful camaraderie they had displayed in the original trilogy.

JD Fenix also received a mixed response, although critics were more concerned with whether his characterization was compelling enough to succeed Marcus as the series' lead. Julie Muncy of Wired regarded Kait Diaz as the emotional centre and most vivid member of the new cast in Gears of War 4, while describing JD as its most disappointing character. Hayden Dingman of PCWorld similarly called JD the least interesting character in the game and preferred both Kait and Del, arguing that his relatively conventional characterization left him competing unfavourably with the more distinctive Marcus. Other reviewers responded more favourably. John Saavedra of Den of Geek considered JD considerably more charismatic than Marcus and praised the humour in their father–son interactions, although he likewise felt that Marcus's familiarity tended to overshadow him and that Kait supplied much of the story's emotional motivation.

Kait Diaz received particularly positive attention after succeeding JD as the central protagonist of Gears 5. Alysia Judge of The Guardian described Kait's promotion as a successful transition and discussed the positive response to her personality and story, while Todd Martens of the Los Angeles Times considered her the most fully realized character in the series and argued that centering the game on her allowed it to explore heritage, militarism and outsider identity with greater emotional depth. Dingman likewise argued that replacing JD with Kait gave Gears 5 a more charismatic lead who did not have to compete directly with Marcus's established reputation.

=== Ensemble cast and representation ===
Reviewing Gears of War 3, Ben Kuchera described the soldiers as people defined by survival, regret and accumulated loss. He interpreted the conclusion as asking what remained for them after a life consumed by warfare, while criticizing dialogue that repeatedly explained obvious objectives. Tom Chick, writing for Quarter to Three, was more dismissive of the characterization. He treated Marcus's confrontation with Griffin as an example of the story's excessive shouting and found the female soldiers insufficiently developed. Writing for The Phoenix, Maddy Myers disputed Chick's assessment of the women characters in Gears of War 3. She regarded Sam's joking as a response to fear, comparable to Cole's performative confidence, and Anya's transition between calm tactical dialogue and aggressive combat speech as evidence of her experience. Myers welcomed the presence of multiple playable women with distinct personalities whose inclusion did not depend on sexual appeal. She nevertheless criticized the setting's treatment of women, particularly the reproductive coercion described in the tie-in fiction. She interpreted the harassment directed at Sam and Anya as an uncomfortable parallel with the treatment of women entering male-dominated gaming communities.

In his review of Gears 5, Goroff praised the conflict within the new Delta Squad, describing Del as its moral center, JD as seeking to make amends and Kait as searching for an explanation of her connection to the Swarm. He considered their secrets, guilt and disagreements a substantial improvement over earlier reliance on bereavement as motivation. He also found that pauses between battles gave their relationships room to develop.

Reception to the ensemble cast of characters in the spin-off games were mixed. Brett Makedonski Destructoid felt that Gabe and the other principal characters of Gears Tactics were more effective as battlefield units than as drivers of its comparatively slight story. GameSpot similarly regarded the campaign as a relatively disposable side story despite Gabe's connection to Kait. Game Informer's Matt Miller found the cast of Gears Tactics somewhat conventional but considered its voice performances and cinematics effective at giving the characters emotional weight. Josh West of GamesRadar+ found the same game's characters difficult to care about, arguing that it lacked the emphasis on family that supported other entries. Other critics responded more favourably: Windows Central included Gabe among the game's "stellar new characters", while NME observed that his initially conventional soldier persona was complicated by moments in which he questioned the COG and the morality of the conflict. Reviewing Hivebusters for Windows Central, Samuel Tolbert praised the attention to Mac's depression and Lahni's rediscovery of her culture. He thought Keegan provided a useful contrast but received less development than his companions.

=== Analysis ===
Ruiz Sánchez and Molina Vega examined Marcus, Dom, Baird and Cole as differing expressions of hegemonic masculinity in the original trilogy. They argued that the characters share a traditional masculine ideal built around physical strength, emotional restraint, competitiveness, violence and military authority, despite expressing those qualities in different ways. The authors interpreted Marcus and Dom's close friendship as constrained by expectations against overt affection between men, while Baird's rivalry with the others reflected competition for status. They identified Dom's death as the point at which Marcus most visibly breaks from his usual emotional restraint. In their qualitative survey of 30 male Gears of War players in Mexico, most participants did not strongly identify the cast with hegemonic masculinity; Ruiz Sánchez and Molina Vega interpreted this as evidence that such traits had become normalized and consequently less visible. The same study argued that race and ethnicity distinguish the four men within this masculine framework. Ruiz Sánchez and Molina Vega described Marcus as a white, blue-eyed authority figure and Baird as a white character associated with intelligence and verbal skill; they characterized Dom as a darker-skinned Latino whose more exuberant personality drew on Latino stereotypes, and Cole as a Black former athlete whose exceptional size, roughness and violence were balanced by his good-hearted characterization. They further interpreted the leadership roles afforded to Marcus and Baird as part of a racialized hierarchy in which the darker-skinned characters generally occupy subordinate positions. Most participants in their survey did not perceive skin color as influencing the characters' hierarchy, which the authors again attributed to the normalization and limited recognition of racial discrimination.

Michael Goroff's analysis for EGM situated the characters within a recurring cycle of conflict over Imulsion. He read Marcus's loyalty as directed toward people rather than patriotic obedience, and connected Niles's experiments to the creation of enemies through attempts to secure military and industrial power. Goroff also compared the COG's rejection of the Locust with Myrrah's insistence on the Horde's superiority, identifying dehumanization on both sides. In his account, the Swarm and the postwar COG perpetuate consequences of the earlier conflict rather than escape them.

Muncy argued that Kait's perspective renewed the series' treatment of war trauma. As an Outsider fighting alongside the COG, she said Kait understands both the need to protect people and the harm caused by the government claiming to protect them. Muncy read the investigation beneath the ice as an image of buried trauma returning to the surface, and praised the quieter exploration for making the setting's history personally meaningful.

== Legacy ==
Discussing the design of Adam Jensen, the protagonist of Deus Ex: Human Revolution, art director Jonathan Jacques-Belletête said that the team deliberately wanted to avoid a big, brutish hero resembling Marcus Fenix. Scott Juster of PopMatters interpreted Vanquish as an affectionate parody of character archetypes in Gears of War. He identified parallels in Robert Burns's exaggerated muscular build, Sam Gideon's gravelly voice and combat dialogue, the protagonists' reliance on female intelligence officers, and the respective Bravo Company and Delta Squad ensembles.

Characters from the Gears of War franchise have appeared in other video game franchises and intellectual properties. Marcus Fenix and Dominic Santiago were included as playable character costumes in the Xbox 360 version of Lost Planet 2 (2010). In August 2012, the second skin pack for Minecraft's Xbox 360 edition added costumes depicting Marcus, Anya Stroud, Damon Baird and Skorge. General RAAM joined the roster of the fighting game Killer Instinct in June 2016 as a playable guest character. His inclusion followed appearances by characters from other Microsoft franchises, including Rash from Battletoads and the Arbiter from Halo. Marcus and Kait Diaz were added as purchasable cosmetic outfits in Fortnite Battle Royale in December 2021. Their accompanying accessories included a Sonic Resonator for Marcus and Reyna's pendant for Kait. In December 2022, Fall Guys introduced costumes based on Marcus, Kait and RAAM. Developed in collaboration with The Coalition, the Marcus and RAAM costumes drew on their appearances in the original Gears of War, while Kait's reproduced her COG armor from the beginning of Gears 5.
