= Locust (Gears of War) =

Fictional species in the Gears of War franchise

- Gears of War race
- Queen Myrrah (centre) leading Locust forces in promotional artwork for Gears of War 3
- First appearance: Gears of War (2006)
- Created by: Epic Games

In-universe information
- Home world: Sera
- Base of operations: The Hollow
- Leader: Queen Myrrah
- Notable members: General RAAM; Skorge; Karn; Ukkon

The Locust are a fictional collective of subterranean species in the Gears of War media franchise. Created by Epic Games, they were introduced in the 2006 video game Gears of War as the principal enemy faction opposing humanity. Their organized military, commonly called the Locust Horde, emerges from beneath the surface of the planet Sera during Emergence Day and wages a prolonged war against the human Coalition of Ordered Governments (COG). Led by the human Queen Myrrah and Locust commanders like General RAAM and Skorge, the Locust are depicted as the principal antagonistic force of the Gears of War franchise.

During development of the first game in the series, Epic designed the Locust as large, physically imposing humanoid enemies that combined monstrous appearances with organized military behaviour. Their size and level of detail affected the environmental and combat design of Gears of War, contributing to the use of tighter spaces and close-range encounters. Subsequent games expanded the range of Locust enemy types and returned periodically to the horror elements of their original conception. The Coalition adopted a similar approach for the prequel Gears of War: E-Day, redesigning familiar Locust enemies to make their initial encounters appear more threatening.

Later installments expanded the Locust beyond their initial role as enemies by depicting their society, hierarchy and conflict with the Lambent. Gears 5 recontextualized their origins by revealing connections between the Horde, Queen Myrrah and COG research at the New Hope Research Facility. Following their apparent destruction in Gears of War 3, Gears of War 4 introduced the Swarm, a successor faction connected to the original Locust. Critics and scholars have examined the Locust's visual and gameplay design as well as their role in the series' treatment of war, militarism and the dehumanization of an enemy.

== Concept and design ==
Early versions of the enemies that became the Locust were known as the "Geists". Art director Chris Perna initially visualised the Geist as hulking white humanoids that emerged from holes dug during the night and abducted children. Perna carried a scalloped motif from their facial design into their armour and proposed vehicles, although the mechanical vehicles were subsequently replaced with creatures. After Nintendo released the video game Geist in 2005, Epic abandoned the name and adopted "Locust", which had previously referred to one unit within the Geist army, for the faction as a whole.

Cliff Bleszinski, lead designer of the first three Gears of War video games, compared the Locust to the Uruk-hai of The Lord of the Rings, emphasizing that although they appeared monstrous, they could organize themselves, employ battlefield tactics, and manufacture and use weapons rather than simply attack mindlessly. During development Bleszinski was also considering a stronger survival-horror direction, influenced by his admiration for Resident Evil 4, and used the term "military horror" for the approach. Although this version of the project was subsequently scaled back, horror elements remained in the finished game.

The physical scale of the Locust affected the design of Gears of War. According to Bissell, the creatures were large and highly detailed, leading Epic to contract its previously spacious prototype environments so that players would encounter them at closer range and could see that detail. Senior gameplay designer Lee Perry said the change was part of the point at which the project began to assume its recognizable form. Epic also made Marcus Fenix and the other human soldiers comparably large, which allowed some animations and art assets to be shared between the factions while maintaining a consistent visual scale.

According to writer Kurtis J. Wiebe, Gears of War: The Rise of RAAM was developed with artist Max Dunbar and The Coalition to expand on aspects of Locust society and religion that the games had previously only hinted at.

=== Enemy design ===
Epic developed Locust enemy types around differing scales and battlefield functions. Discussing Gears of War: Judgment, art director Chris Perna described a recurring "dinosaur chart" used by the team to maintain a range of small, medium-sized and very large creatures that could be combined in combat encounters. He also said that some enemy designs were created around particular gameplay functions. Epic also sought to restore aspects of the Locust's earlier horror-oriented conception for Judgment. Perna said that the series had moved away from their frightening quality over successive games and that the prequel was intended to make them appear more brutal and fearsome again. The developers also introduced more aggressive artificial-intelligence behaviours and greater teamwork among Locust enemies.

The Coalition pursued a similar direction for Gears of War: E-Day. Creative director Matt Searcy described the design brief as treating the Locust as the "monsters under the bed", while studio art director Aryan Hanbeck said that the game presents them through the perspective of characters encountering them for the first time. The team particularly focused on restoring the Locust Drone from an enemy that had become routine in later installments to a threatening individual opponent. The developers also expanded Locust movement and combat behaviours. Enemies can climb and flank the player, while Grenadiers can deploy smoke before approaching at close range.

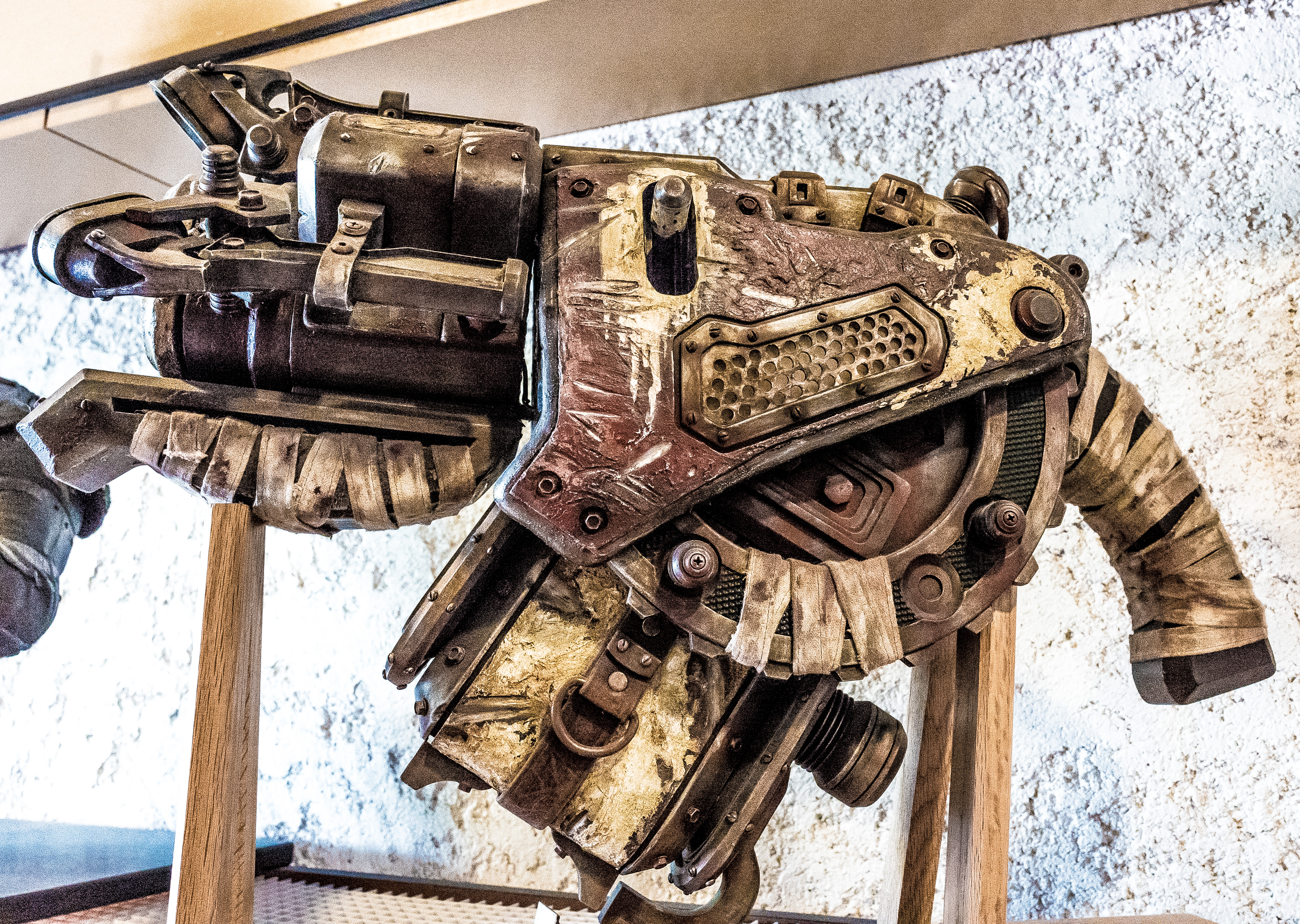
A replica of the Digger Launcher displayed at Epic Games' headquarters in Cary, North Carolina. The weapon fires a burrowing creature as a projectile, which reflects the Locust faction's distinctive combination of industrial machinery and organic creature design elements.

Epic explored weapon concepts that extended the series' creature-based approach beyond enemy design for the Locust. During development of Gears of War 2, for example, the Ticker evolved from an initial proposal for conventional land mines into a small creature carrying an explosive payload. Bleszinski said the change followed the team's tendency to design Locust equipment in terms of creatures rather than ordinary machinery.

For Gears of War 3, Epic also explored weapon concepts that extended this creature-based approach into the Locust arsenal. The Digger Launcher originated from the idea of a projectile that could travel underground rather than function as a conventional explosive. Developers described it as an unusual weapon concept that required early playable prototypes and iteration before completion. The final weapon combined conventional military functionality with a creature-like projectile that burrowed through the battlefield before attacking its target.

=== Development of the Swarm ===
The name "Swarm" originated during Epic Games' abandoned pre-production work on a fourth Gears of War game. After Microsoft acquired the franchise and development passed to The Coalition, studio head Rod Fergusson said the new team retained the name while replacing Epic's proposed creatures: "The name stuck, but none of the monsters stuck." In 2014, The Coalition brought in creature designer Guy Davis to develop early visual concepts for the Swarm; Davis's professional portfolio credits him with creature design on Gears of War 4, while the game's credits list him under additional concept art. Davis said that his early studies experimented with body shapes and facial details intended to distinguish the new creatures from the original Locust. He identified the double nasal cavity and plated, segmented jaw as elements of his concepts that carried into the eventual design, and described his final concept pass as a "Locust based Swarm".

Like the Horde, the Swarm similarly comprises several humanoid and monstrous enemy types. According to Campaign design director Matt Searcy, The Coalition designed enemies according to the battlefield role they were intended to perform, such as forcing players from cover or pinning them in place, before developing their appearance and combining them with other enemy types. Technical director Mike Rayner explained that newer creature types like the Flocks, airborne masses composed of smaller creatures called Leeches introduced in Gears 5, required new support for flying creatures and three-dimensional pathfinding.

== Description ==
=== Background ===
The original trilogy gradually reveals information about the Locust's origins without initially providing a complete explanation. Gears of War 2 introduces the abandoned New Hope Research Facility, where children of Imulsion miners had been subjected to genetic experimentation and transformed into creatures known as Sires. The facility's records direct Delta Squad toward Mount Kadar and establish a connection between the experiments and the Locust without yet explaining their precise relationship.

Gears 5 returns to New Hope and Mount Kadar and explicitly connects the Locust threat to its origin in COG genetic experimentation carried out on children infected by the Imulsion in an attempt by the COG to create soldiers. Within the game, the artificial intelligence of scientist Niles Samson explains that the Locust were developed using genetic material derived from the Sires and Myrrah.

Before their invasion of the surface, the Locust are engaged in a prolonged conflict with the Lambent, Locust altered by exposure to Imulsion. The Lambent spread through the Hollow, killing or converting other Locust and driving the Horde from its underground territory. Gears of War 3 reveals that Adam Fenix had worked with Myrrah on a means of destroying the Lambent while preserving the Locust. He ultimately activates the Imulsion Countermeasure, destroying the Lambent and apparently exterminating the Locust as well.

Gears of War 4, set 25 years later, reveals that the Locust were not completely destroyed. Locust bodies affected by the Countermeasure had become encased in crystalline shells, from which evolved Locust known as Scions later emerged as part of the new Swarm threat. The Swarm also abduct humans and place them in organic pods, where victims can be transformed into Juvies and later into larger Swarm forms. Gears 5 further develops the connection between the factions through Kait Diaz's biological relationship to Myrrah and the Swarm hive network.

=== Society and hierarchy ===
The first Gears of War establishes the Locust as inhabiting the Hollow, an extensive subterranean region beneath the surface of Sera. Later games expand the depiction of Locust society beyond a conventional military force of invading creatures to its art, religion, social hierarchy and written language. Their civilisation is centred on Nexus, an underground city in the Hollow which serves as the seat of Queen Myrrah and is presented in Gears of War 2 through its monumental architecture, religious spaces and written inscriptions.

While Myrrah occupies the highest position in Locust society as its Queen, its leadership is also portrayed as containing distinct military, religious and scientific interests beneath Myrrah rather than a uniformly obedient collective. The comic miniseries Gears of War: The Rise of RAAM focuses on these internal structures, which shows the Locust General RAAM encountering opposition from both peers and superiors within the Locust leadership while he attempts to persuade other influential Locust to support abandoning the Hollow for the surface. Besides RAAM, Myrrah receives competing advice from senior figures including military commander Sraak, the Kantus priesthood, and the scientist Ukkon; the resulting disputes include rivalry between commanders, disagreements over religious prophecy and political manoeuvring over military strategy. Myrrah nevertheless retains the final authority to determine the Horde's course and to elevate or remove commanders.

Its military, known as the Locust Horde, contains numerous infantry classes and specialized creatures used in combat. The military uses its own hierarchy of ranks. The Rise of RAAM identifies a Maag as a private, Vurl as a sergeant, Vold as a lieutenant, Krav as a captain, Zamil as a general and Uzil as the Horde's high general. RAAM's story is structured around advancement through this hierarchy: before becoming the commander encountered in the original Gears of War, he challenges the strategy of Uzil Sraak and gains enough support within the Horde for Myrrah to place him at the head of its army.

The Kantus are the Horde's priestly class and practise the Trinity of Worms, a belief system associated with the enormous creatures inhabiting the Hollow. Their senior priest bears the title Ketor. In The Rise of RAAM, religious authority becomes part of the Horde's internal politics: Skorge's claims of prophetic visions initially bring him into conflict with the priesthood, while RAAM subsequently seeks support from the Kantus as part of his effort to change the Horde's military strategy. The prominence of religious imagery is also visible throughout Nexus in Gears of War 2, where inscriptions and artefacts provide much of the series' information about Locust beliefs.

Gears Tactics establishes Ukkon, a geneticist whose scientific experiments supplies the Horde with engineered creatures for warfare, as an important figure of the Locust faction and attributes the Horde's successful incorporation of creatures like the Brumak and Corpser to his work. This scientific element complements the military and priestly leadership surrounding Myrrah, while also explaining the Horde's systematic adaptation of the Hollow's fauna into weapons and transport.

=== Military units and creatures ===
The Locust Horde include humanoid soldiers and several creatures used in combat as part of its armed forces. Drones form the bulk of the Locust army, with specialised variants including Grenadiers, which favour close-range combat, and Snipers. Therons are elite soldiers equipped for specialist combat roles and command functions. They are typically heavily armored associated with the Torque Bow, while the much larger Boomers carrying heavy weaponry such as the Boomshot. Kantus serve as support units in the battlefield, using their vocalisations to strengthen or revive incapacitated Locust. Berserkers are female Locust distinguished by their exceptional size and strength. They are blind creatures which locate prey through sound and smell and are capable of breaking through walls.

The Horde also incorporates various creatures from the subterranean Hollow into its military. Wretches are small, fast pack attackers used to overwhelm enemies at close range, while Tickers carry explosives and function as mobile bombs. Among the larger creatures are Corpsers, spider-like digging beasts used to open subterranean routes for Locust forces; Brumaks, enormous creatures fitted with armour and heavy weapons; and Reavers, flying creatures that serve as mounts and weapons platforms.

Other creatures occupy more specialised roles. Seeders operate as living artillery, launching airborne Nemacysts against enemy aircraft and positions. Reavers can similarly transport Locust troops before remaining on the battlefield as mobile heavy weapons platforms. Bloodmounts are ridden into combat by Locust soldiers, while the light-sensitive Kryll appear in enormous swarms and turn darkness itself into a hazard during the original Gears of War. The Locust also exploit the Riftworm in Gears of War 2, using the enormous subterranean creature to sink human cities from below.

Later games expanded the range of smaller specialised creatures. Gears of War 3 introduced the Serapede, an electrically charged centipede-like creature, and the Digger, a small burrowing organism used as ammunition for the Digger Launcher, allowing the Locust to attack beneath conventional cover. The series increasingly made the distinctions between these creatures mechanical as well as visual: Gears of War 3's Beast mode allowed players to control different Locust types with individual abilities, while Gears of War: Judgment's OverRun mode divided creatures such as Tickers, Wretches, Kantus, Maulers, Serapedes and Corpsers into different tactical roles.

==== Swarm forms ====
Encountered in Gears of War 4 and Gears 5, the Swarm's ability to propagate and replenish its numbers is incorporated directly into its enemy design: humans captured by large creatures known as Snatchers are transported to Swarm hives and enclosed in organic pods, where they are transformed into new members of the faction. "Juvies", smaller creatures that attack rapidly in groups, emerge from these pods and subsequently develop into armed Drones, which most closely reproduce the behaviour of the earlier Locust infantry, using firearms, cover and flanking tactics. Snatchers also function as powerful combat enemies, swallowing incapacitated characters and forcing their allies to rescue them. Scions provide the principal link between the Swarm and the original Locust. They are substantially larger humanoid combatants and frequently carry heavy weapons, appearing alongside newer Swarm creatures like the heavily built Carriers and Pouncers, larger quadrupedal creatures capable of leaping onto opponents and attacking at range with barbs fired from their tails,

Gears 5 further expanded the faction with Wardens, heavily armoured Scions carrying large maces, and biological creatures like Leeches which can overtake the Coalition's robotic DeeBees: this combines the Swarm's organic enemies with altered versions of the DeeBees which were introduced in Gears of War 4, producing hostile machines such as Rejects, Stumps and Bastions.

== Appearances ==
=== Original trilogy ===
The Locust first appear in Gears of War, set fourteen years after Emergence Day. Marcus Fenix and Delta Squad attempt to map the Locust tunnel network and ultimately deploy the Lightmass Bomb against it. General RAAM is the principal Locust commander encountered during the game and is defeated before the bomb is detonated, destroying part of the Horde's underground network.

In Gears of War 2, the COG launches Operation Hollow Storm after the Locust begin sinking human cities from beneath the surface. Delta Squad infiltrates Nexus, the Locust capital, where it encounters Queen Myrrah and the Locust commander Skorge. After learning that sinking Jacinto would flood the Hollow, the COG deliberately destroys the city in an attempt to wipe out the remaining Locust forces.

Gears of War 3 depicts both humanity and the surviving Locust under threat from the spreading Lambent. The game reveals Adam Fenix's earlier work with Myrrah on a method of destroying the Lambent without killing the Locust. His completed Countermeasure ultimately destroys the Lambent and apparently exterminates the Locust.

=== Prequels and later games ===
Gears of War: Judgment returns to the opening phase of the Locust War, approximately one month after Emergence Day. Its campaign follows Kilo Squad during the battle for Halvo Bay, where the squad opposes Locust forces led by Karn. Gears Tactics, set twelve years before the original game, follows Gabe Diaz's campaign against Ukkon, a member of the Locust Council who is responsible for genetically engineering creatures like the Brumak, Reaver and Corpser for military use by the Horde.

Gears of War 4 introduces the Swarm as the new enemy faction and gradually reveals its connection to the Locust. Gears 5 centres much of its campaign on Kait Diaz's investigation of her connection to the Locust and the origins of the Swarm. Gears of War: E-Day is set fourteen years before the first Gears of War and follows Marcus Fenix and Dominic Santiago during the Locust invasion on Emergence Day. It is scheduled for release on October 6, 2026.

== Reception and analysis ==
=== Critical reception ===
In his review of Gears of War, Jeff Gerstmann of GameSpot noted that most Locust encountered by players were humanoid soldiers with relatively minor visual differences, while other enemies included differently armed humanoids and creatures ranging from small opponents to large monsters. He found that the different enemies used somewhat different tactics. Clive Thompson of Wired singled out the Berserker's sound design, describing its distorted vocalizations as particularly disturbing.

Ben Lindbergh of The Ringer argued that despite Gears of War 4's 25-year time jump, new protagonist and new enemy faction, it differed little from the original trilogy. He pointed to the Swarm's visual resemblance and close relationship to the Locust, as well as the game's otherwise familiar structure and gameplay.

=== Analysis ===
A pair of cosplayers dressed in costume as Locust characters

In a 2012 study of visual style in video games, Yin Wu used Gears of War 3 as a case study for how visual design can communicate narrative and gameplay information. Wu contrasted the Locust's angular forms, spikes, asymmetry and skeletal or insect-like motifs with the more orderly geometric construction associated with the human faction. He also examined the use of blue lights on human uniforms and red markers on Locust armour, which allow players to distinguish allies and enemies during combat. Wu compared the armour of Drones, Theron Elites and Palace Guards, arguing that differences in protection and decoration communicate their relative status within the Horde. He also argued that although Locust soldiers retain a humanoid form capable of eliciting sympathy, their monstrous and repulsive appearance reduces the potential for guilt or sympathy toward enemies that players repeatedly kill.

In a 2015 master's thesis on procedural rhetoric and masculinity in the Gears of War series, Shane Snyder examined the tension between the Locust's human-like qualities and their treatment as enemies. Snyder noted that Locust Drones share the muscular physiques and armour of the human soldiers, while their monstrous features mark them as disposable threats. He also pointed to their use of complex weapons and technology, their limited speech, and the ability of wounded Locust to be revived by their comrades. Snyder argued that the games nevertheless prevent diplomatic interaction with them and give players little opportunity to consider their motivations.

Snyder also argued that the trilogy leaves the Locust's grievances largely to Myrrah, whose explanation of their claim to survival comes near the end of Gears of War 3, after the player has spent much of the series fighting them. Phil Hornshaw of GameSpot wrote that the series establishes the Locust as a society with cities, art, written language, religion and a social hierarchy, and later reveals that their move to the surface followed an existential conflict with the Lambent. He argued that this complicates their original presentation as an existential threat, particularly as later games reveal the COG's role in creating them and depict the protagonists using weapons that kill them on a massive scale. Hornshaw criticised the series for raising these questions without requiring its protagonists to address them in comparable depth.

Grace Benfell of GameSpot argued that the original game presents the Locust as an intelligent but brutish enemy whose threat helps justify the COG's militarised society. She wrote that later installments complicate this portrayal by connecting the Locust's emergence to the COG's actions and making their war against humanity partly a struggle for survival. Benfell also compared the Locust with COG soldiers, noting that they share a similar gait, armour and determination.
