= GOW2 =

GoW2 may refer to:

- God of War II, the sequel to the PlayStation 2 exclusive game God of War
- Gears of War 2, the Xbox 360 exclusive sequel to the Xbox 360 and PC game Gears of War
