= Gears of War: E-Day =

2026 video game

- Developers: The Coalition; People Can Fly (Note: Additional work by Behaviour Interactive and Virtuos)
- Publisher: Xbox Game Studios
- Director: Matt Searcy
- Producer: Darren Wood
- Programmer: Kate Rayner
- Artist: Aryan Hanbeck
- Writers: Adrian Southin; Daija Marrow
- Composer: Adam Lastiwka
- Series: Gears of War
- Engine: Unreal Engine 5
- Platforms: Windows; Xbox Series X/S
- Release: October 6, 2026 (Note: Pre-ordering the Premium Edition grants five-day early access beginning on October 1, 2026.)
- Genre: Third-person shooter
- Modes: Single-player, multiplayer

Gears of War: E-Day is a 2026 third-person shooter video game developed by The Coalition and People Can Fly and published by Xbox Game Studios. It is the sixth main installment in the Gears of War series. Set fourteen years before the events of the first game, it takes place during Emergence Day, when the Locust Horde first emerged from beneath the planet Sera and launched a devastating surprise attack against humanity. The story follows war veterans Marcus Fenix and Dominic Santiago as they fight to survive the invasion in the city of Kalona alongside fellow soldiers Mags Carter and Lucas Reyes, forming Bravo Squad amid the collapse of civilization. The narrative explores the origins of Marcus and Dom's brotherhood while depicting the fall of Kalona and humanity's first encounters with the Locust Horde.

The gameplay expands upon the series' cover-based combat with redesigned movement mechanics and enhanced traversal options that allow for greater mobility and verticality. The campaign supports four-player online cooperative play and two-player split-screen co-op on consoles, while multiplayer modes include 4v4 competitive matches and a new twelve-player cooperative mode titled Horde Siege.

The game also introduces expanded destruction systems, dynamic environmental damage, and enhanced gore effects, all built using Unreal Engine 5. Development began following The Coalition's transition to Unreal Engine 5, with the studio aiming to recapture the atmosphere, themes, and emotional tone of the original Gears of War, particularly the sense of brotherhood, brutality, and tragedy associated with Emergence Day. The game was initially released for premium early access on October 1, 2026, ahead of its official launch on October 6, for Windows and Xbox Series X/S.

Upon release, Gears of War: E-Day received generally positive reviews from critics, praising its return to the franchise's darker roots, emotional weight, visuals, combat, customization, and Horde Siege mode, with some criticism on pacing in the semi-open levels, boss battles, and omitted mechanics.

== Gameplay ==
Third-person perspective of Marcus Fenix

Gears of War: E-Day is a third-person shooter played from an over-the-shoulder perspective, with players controlling Marcus Fenix. The game retains the series' signature cover-based combat while introducing a redesigned movement system built to provide greater mobility and fluidity. New traversal abilities allow players to slide from a sprint, jump across gaps, climb vehicles and structures, and use low-ground cover, enabling more dynamic movement and verticality during combat. The movement system was rebuilt from the ground up, with developers aiming to preserve the weight and feel of previous Gears of War titles while expanding player freedom.

The campaign is set throughout the city of Kalona during Emergence Day, humanity's first encounter with the Locust Horde. Missions range from traditional linear combat sequences to larger open districts that allow players to approach objectives from multiple directions. Optional encounters and side activities enable players to assist civilians, investigate events across the city, and explore areas beyond the main story path. Combat centers on battles against the Locust Horde, including returning enemies such as Drones, Boomers, Wretches, Corpsers, and Reavers, alongside new creatures originating from the Hollows. Emergence Holes return as a dynamic gameplay mechanic, allowing Locust forces to appear throughout battles. Players can destroy Emergence Holes with explosives, while destructible environments provide additional tactical opportunities and can alter the battlefield during encounters.

The game introduces several new weapons, including the Gutpuncher grenade launcher and the Incinerator shotgun. The Chainsaw Lancer also appears in an origin-story role, depicting the weapon's earliest development during the Locust invasion. The Active Reload system returns with a redesigned interface, and some weapons feature shell-by-shell reloading, allowing players to interrupt reload animations and fire before a magazine is fully replenished. Expanded execution animations and a new gore system feature localized damage, enhanced dismemberment effects, and dynamic blood, dirt, and environmental damage that accumulate on characters throughout gameplay. The campaign supports four-player online cooperative play and two-player split-screen cooperative play on consoles. All four members of Bravo Squad are playable from the beginning of the campaign. According to the developers, gameplay was designed around the theme of "Never Fight Alone", with squad-based mechanics encouraging players to support teammates and coordinate during combat encounters.

=== Multiplayer ===
The game's competitive multiplayer features 4v4 team-based modes set on maps located throughout Kalona and its surrounding areas. According to the developers, the maps retain the series' traditional symmetrical design while incorporating new traversal mechanics and greater verticality. Gears of War: E-Day introduces the most significant changes to the series' multiplayer gameplay since Gears of War 3, including a redesigned control scheme in which taking cover is assigned to the A button, sprinting to the left-stick click, and vaulting and jumping to the Y button, allowing for greater mobility during combat. Returning competitive modes include Team Deathmatch and Conquest, which emphasize the series' cover-based combat, close-quarters engagements, and objective control.

The game also introduces Horde Siege, a new cooperative player-versus-environment mode supporting up to 12 players divided into three four-player squads. Set across a large interconnected version of Kalona, the mode tasks players with completing dynamic objectives, defending locations against large-scale Locust attacks, undertaking optional side missions, and extracting after surviving successive enemy waves. Unlike previous Horde modes, Horde Siege allows multiple squads to operate simultaneously across the map. Players can choose from the Assault, Breacher, Marksman, and Medic classes, each with unique tactical abilities, while earning resources to construct defensive emplacements and replenish ammunition during matches.

== Plot ==
=== Setting ===
Gears of War: E-Day is set on the planet Sera 14 years before the events of the original Gears of War, shortly after the conclusion of the Pendulum Wars. Humanity has entered a fragile period of peace, and many Coalition of Ordered Governments (COG) soldiers called Gears are being demobilized. The game takes place in the city of Kalona, a major industrial center once known for innovation and scientific advancement that was transformed by decades of wartime Imulsion production.

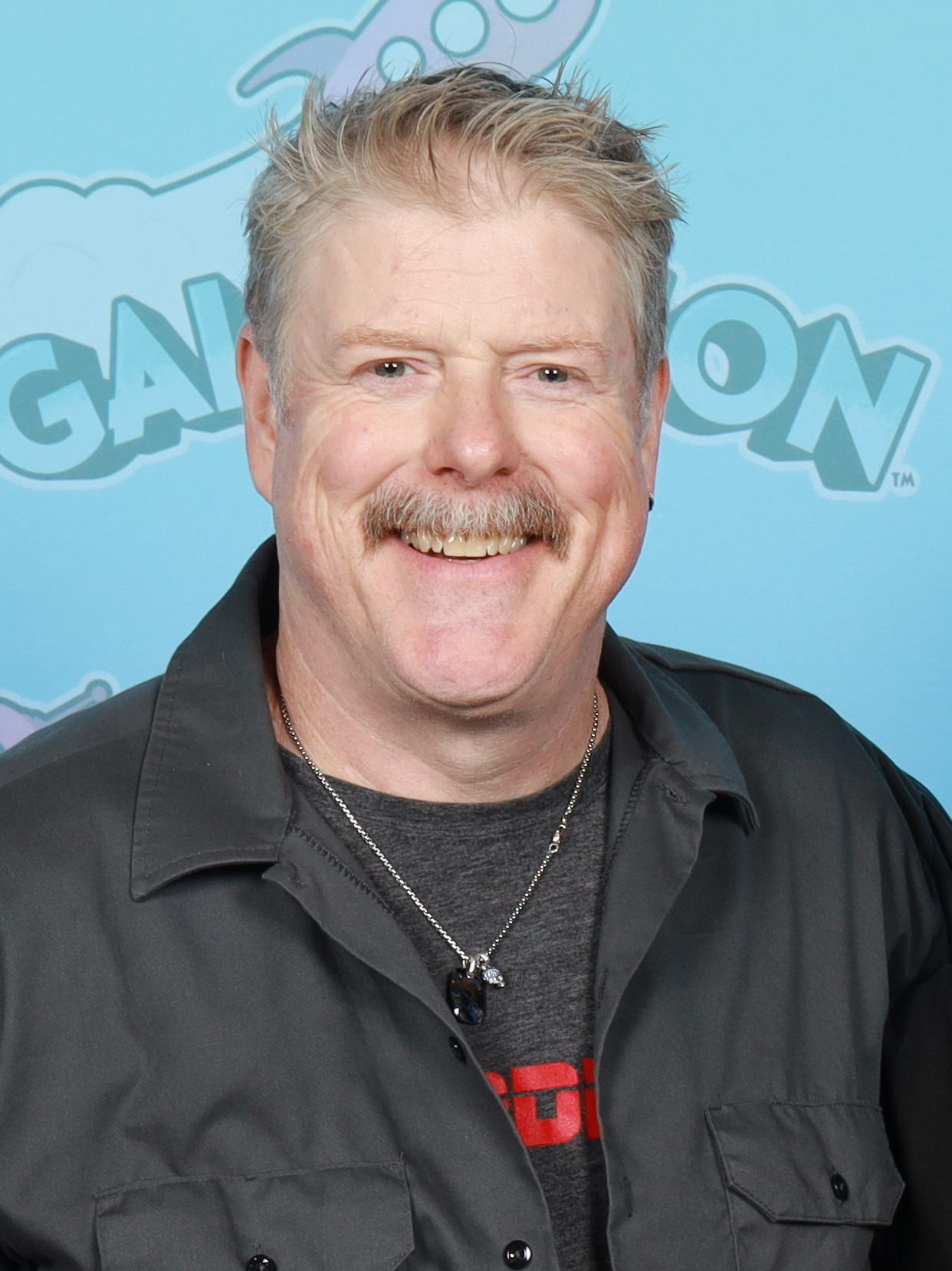
John DiMaggio voices Marcus Fenix, reprising the role from previous installments in the series.

The story follows Marcus Fenix (John DiMaggio) and Dominic "Dom" Santiago (Carlos Ferro) as they have different views on what to do after the end of the Pendulum Wars. Marcus' best friend and Dom's older brother, Carlos, was killed shortly before the war's conclusion, emotionally affecting them both. Their lives are abruptly changed on Emergence Day, when the Locust Horde unexpectedly erupts from underground and launches a devastating surprise attack across Sera, plunging humanity into a fight for survival. Forced back into combat, Marcus and Dom join former Gear Mags Carter, an employee at Kalona's Imulsion Refinery, and Lucas Reyes, a young communications cadet with no frontline combat experience. Together, they form Bravo Squad and battle through the destruction of Kalona over the course of the invasion's opening days.

As civilian and military defenses collapse, the squad rescues survivors, organizes resistance efforts, and confronts the Locust for the first time. Along the way, they encounter other COG personnel, including veteran warrior Tai Kaliso and Raven pilot Gil Gettner. Set during humanity's first encounters with the Locust Horde, the story chronicles the opening hours of the Locust War and explores themes of loss, loyalty, sacrifice, and brotherhood. Players witness the fall of Kalona, the origins of several key elements of the series' lore, and the early development of the chainsaw-equipped Lancer Assault Rifle as humanity struggles to survive one of the darkest days in its history.

=== Synopsis ===
Marcus Fenix in-game

Six weeks after the end of the Pendulum Wars, Marcus and Dom are in Kalona for a ceremony honoring the fallen of the Battle of Aspho Fields. Afterwards, Dom reveals that he intends to retire from the service while Marcus struggles with the thought of civilian life. The two meet communications cadet Lucas Reyes and discharged Gear turned refinery worker Mags Carter.

Marcus, Dom, Mags, and Lucas are caught by surprise when a series of earthquakes strike Kalona, followed shortly by the emergence of a horde of Locust from underground that begin slaughtering everybody in sight. Marcus and his team manage to fight their way to City Hall, where the local military commander Colonel Trench takes charge of the city's defense from Mayor Shaw and organizes Marcus and team into Bravo Squad under the command of Captain Akila Grey. After Marcus discovers the ineffectiveness of the COG's bayonet, Sergeant Major Hank Rustin develops a Lancer with a prototype of the Chainsaw Bayonet, inspired by Tai Kaliso using a chainsaw against the Locust.

The next morning, Trench begins organizing the Gears to set up a defense line to ultimately push the Locust out of Kalona. In addition to securing strategic objectives, Bravo Squad is also specifically tasked to destroy a special shipment of Imulsion, as well as recover a VIP, Dr. Dalia Fabbri. However, Bravo Squad becomes increasingly more uncomfortable when they realize Trench is more concerned about prioritizing Fabbri's extraction rather than the evacuation of civilians still trapped in enemy territory, as well as the fact the Locust appear to be far more intelligent than they assumed. They end up discovering that the Locust attacking Kalona have a leader named Vraahk who has been hunting down and executing any high ranking Gears and city officials he can capture.

Trench then makes the controversial decision to pull back over half of his forces, including Bravo Squad, to the airfield to prepare for the arrival of General Iver who will take over command of the defense of Kalona. However, the Locust attack the airfield just as the general arrives, killing him, destroying the airfield, and scattering the Gear forces. Bravo Squad manage to evacuate on a Raven but crash land in the nearby forest, where they are then caught in a cave in and find themselves inside the Locust tunnel network. There, they find that the Locust have been listening in on their communications the entire time, explaining how they always knew where and when to attack, and that they are secretly marching an entire army into Kalona through the tunnels.

Bravo Squad manage to return to the surface and warn Grey about the impending Locust attack. Grey informs them that Trench has already ordered the evacuation of all Gears and surviving civilians to their final stronghold at Fort Vigil. As they cross the river, Trench deliberately strands several civilians on the bridge so that he can lure as many Locust on there before demolishing it. Bravo Squad balk at Trench's willingness to sacrifice civilians and instead help them escape. A furious Trench then goes to detonate the bridge himself, but he is killed by Vraahk. Bravo Squad manages to reach Fort Vigil and hold off a massive Locust assault, but much of the fort's defenses are left in ruins. The remaining officers determine that Kalona is lost, and their only hope at survival is reactivating the decommissioned Raven's Nest warship Resolute and escaping by sea. Lucas also suggests reactivating an old transmission tower at the port so they can reestablish communications with High Command.

While another force is dispatched to secure the Resolute, Bravo Squad heads to restore communications. They manage to make contact with Anya at Ephyra who informs them Port Farrall is a safe rally point, but are dismayed to learn all cities across Sera have been attacked simultaneously, so no reinforcements can be dispatched to Kalona. Dom is also distraught to learn Ephyra was also attacked and his family is presumed dead. On the way back to Fort Vigil, they notice the Timgad Refinery is on the verge of overloading, so they detour to shut it down. Inside, they discover a secret lab where the COG was secretly developing a Lightmass Missile, which was the research Trench wanted to retrieve. Furious at the COG's deception, Mags averts the refinery's overload by dumping all of its stored Imulsion into the Locust tunnels below.

Bravo Squad eventually makes their way to the Resolute, where they help the crew repel a Locust attack and launch the ship. They then deploy to the bridge to raise it so the Resolute can leave the bay. However, Vraahk has already predicted their plan and is there waiting for them. Dom is ready to sacrifice himself for the others, thinking he has nothing left with all of his family presumed dead, but Marcus stops him, not wanting to lose him like Carlos, embracing Dom as his brother. After a grueling battle, Marcus is able to trigger the explosives Trench planted, both destroying the bridge and killing Vraahk. The remaining survivors board the Resolute and leave Kalona by sea. As they view the ruins of Kalona, Dom expresses his desire to return to Ephyra to confirm the fate of his family, and he and Marcus promise to keep fighting the Locust until the end.

== Development ==
The game was developed by The Coalition in collaboration with People Can Fly, which previously assisted with the first three Gears of War games and developed Gears of War: Judgment, and with additional work by Behaviour Interactive and Virtuos. The collaboration between The Coalition and People Can Fly on E-Day was announced in January 2025.

Development of Gears of War: E-Day followed the release of Gears 5 in 2019. The Coalition continued supporting Gears 5 after its release while also developing the Hivebusters expansion and Gears Tactics. During this period, the studio began considering the direction of its next Gears of War project. The developers said this process gave them an opportunity to reconsider the series' identity and the elements they wanted to emphasize in a new game. The Coalition eventually chose to develop a prequel centered on Emergence Day. Creative director Matt Searcy and brand director Nicole Fawcette said the decision was influenced by themes associated with the original games, including brotherhood, brutality, and pathos. The project also allowed the studio to revisit the visual and atmospheric style of the earlier games while using newer technology.

=== Narrative ===
E-Day, as a prequel to the original trilogy, was billed as a mainline installment in the series. The team felt creating a franchise origin story was an opportunity "too good to miss", and reiterated that they were not abandoning the story threads established in the newer games in the series. E-Day was described by the team as an "origin story" focused on the brotherhood between series protagonist Marcus Fenix and Dom Santiago. The Coalition added the game will have a "modern take" on both characters, who are youthful, "vulnerable" and inexperienced in this game. Both DiMaggio and Ferro reprise their roles of Fenix and Santiago respectively. Gears of War: E-Day's narrative is entirely focused on Bravo Squad with creative director Matt Searcy comparing it to Band of Brothers and Saving Private Ryan. The team chose Emergence Day as the setting because they felt that it encapsulated several core themes of the series such as the brotherhood between the coalition soldiers, a melancholic tone, and a focus on both brutality and action. The team were granted a sense of freedom in that Epic Games had never told the story of Emergence Day in detail in their original Xbox 360 games. They sought to portray E-Day without contradicting established canon such as the novel Gears of War: Aspho Fields by Karen Traviss. Traviss consulted with The Coalition on the story.

The events in E-Day unfold across three days, each with their own theme. The first night emphasizes confusion and fear brought about by a kind of "monster invasion — almost like a zombie movie" according to Searcy. Day two sees the formation of the squad and connection with the military while day three consists of "desperation". The team's goal was to "capture a moment in time" and tell an "intimate" story, exploring how an ill-prepared and desperate civilization react to a sudden, nearly unstoppable apocalypse. Similar to the early games of the series, E-Day has a large focus on horror. Locust Drones, which were cannon fodder in early installments of the series, were redesigned in E-Day to look more intimidating and formidable. It will also introduce the origin of the Lancer Assault Rifle, a signature weapon for the series. In contrast to Gears 5 which introduced elements commonly found in open world games, E-Day will be a more linear experience. The game was officially announced in June 2024 with an in-engine trailer created in collaboration with Blur Studio and GNet.

=== Technology ===
Gears of War: E-Day was developed in Unreal Engine 5 where the "leap in technical capabilities is tremendous" according to Kate Rayner, The Coalition's technical director. For E-Day, The Coalition decided not to reuse assets from previous Gears of War games. The studio rebuilt the game's characters, enemies, weapons, animations, sound, and environments from the ground up. Technical director Kate Rayner described the process as beginning with "an empty hard drive". The developers said this approach allowed them to reconsider the series' systems without being constrained by technology and assets inherited from previous installments.

Rayner said E-Day boasts "over 100 times more environment and character details than Gears 5" that was built in Unreal Engine 4. With Gears of War: E-Day, The Coalition sought to "set a new standard in technical excellence" with Unreal Engine 5. The Coalition rebuilt Gears of War: E-Day from scratch without the reuse of assets or animation from previous Gears of War titles. Starting from what Rayner called "an empty hard drive", the studio was forced to ask what Gears of War needs to be in 2026 and how it can be updated. Hardware-accelerated ray tracing is included via hardware Lumen in Unreal Engine 5, enabling physically accurate ray traced reflections. Gears of War: E-Day is among the first titles to ship with MegaLights, first introduced in Unreal Engine 5.7, that provides a unified direct illumination lighting system. MegaLights allowed artists to place hundreds of lights in a scene that are all able to cast their own ray traced soft shadows. It reduces the cost of dynamic shadowing by stochastically sampling the lights in a scene with a fixed number of rays per pixel and then shading ray hits and occlusion. The Coalition claimed that MegaLights allowed them to lean into the horror aspects of Gears of War with stronger contrast and darker spaces. Native HDR10 support is included.

The Nanite virtualized geometry system in Unreal Engine 5 is used to achieve greater geometric density over Gears 5. The Coalition had collaborated with Epic Games on Unreal Engine 5 development, debuting a demo in April 2022 using Nanite that showcased assets with 100 times more geometric detail than possible previously. Increased geometric density has allowed character design in Gears of War: E-Day to be refined and modernized. Brand director Nicole Fawcette called Marcus and Dom in early Gears of War titles "big beefy tanks, exaggerated in their design", in part due to technical limitations. They have "come to life as human characters" in E-Day due to modern rendering techniques. For character rendering, new facial animation systems were added featuring more than 350 facial shapes per character and substantially more animation joints than previous entries. The studio sought to balance realism with the established stylized appearances of characters such as Marcus Fenix and Dominic Santiago.

Kalona was designed as the largest and most detailed location featured in a Gears of War title. E-Day is restricted to the single large location of Kalona with a greater emphasis on environmental storytelling rather than a set of disconnected linear levels. The studio developed new procedural tools to create the city's districts, roads, architecture, debris systems, and destructible environments. The game's real-time destruction system includes large-scale structural collapses, sinkholes, and localized damage on objects and environmental surfaces. Surfaces used as cover can be chipped away across a range of materials. An enhanced gore system with dismemberment is also included. Bullets can tear chunks out of enemy flesh while more powerful weapons will tear off entire limbs.

The Coalition formed a partnership with Nvidia for optimization work on PC to deliver "a first-class PC experience". Nvidia's RTX Mega Geometry is included to accelerate the building of bounding volume hierarchies (BVHs) for ray tracing against complex Nanite geometry. Lower-resolution proxies for geometry are normally included in ray tracing BVHs but RTX Mega Geometry includes higher detail geometry through nested cluster triangles, known as Cluster-Level Acceleration Structures (CLAS), within a BHV. CPU overhead from BVH updates and management is reduced by only reconstructing BVHs with affected CLAS. Advanced Shader Delivery, where precompiled shaders are delivered alongside the game download, is used on PC to reduce load times and eliminate shader compilation stutter on first boot. On Xbox Series X, Gears of War: E-Day has a 60 frames per second target in the campaign while its multiplayer mode runs at up to 120 frames per second.

=== Music ===
The music for Gears of War: E-Day was composed by Adam Lastiwka, who previously worked on the music for Gears 5. Lastiwka composed 25 hours of music for the game. He also reworked Gary Jules and Michael Andrews's cover of "Mad World" for the game's reveal trailer and composed the main theme, "Emergence", released on June 8, 2026. An instrumental version of Metallica's "For Whom the Bell Tolls" is available as one of four options for the game's main menu soundtrack.

== Release ==
Collector's edition of the game

Gears of War: E-Day was first announced on June 9, 2024, during the Xbox Games Showcase 2024. It was revealed with an in-engine cinematic trailer featuring younger versions of Marcus Fenix and Dominic Santiago during the Locust Horde's first invasion of Sera on Emergence Day.

Gears of War E-Day promotion in Los Angeles

It later received its official release date and first gameplay reveal on June 7, 2026, during the Xbox Games Showcase 2026 and Gears of War: E-Day Direct. Xbox CEO Asha Sharma announced during the Xbox Games Showcase 2026 that Gears of War: E-Day would be an Xbox console exclusive, releasing only on Xbox Series X/S consoles and Windows. The announcement came despite a PEGI rating published shortly before the showcase that listed a PlayStation 5 version.

Gears of War: E-Day was released on October 6, 2026, for Windows and Xbox Series X/S. The game launched during the twentieth anniversary year of the Gears of War franchise and the twenty-fifth anniversary of Xbox. It was also made available through Xbox Game Pass at launch and supports Play Anywhere cross-progression on the latter platforms. An open beta took place ahead of release, beginning on August 6, 2026.

== Reception ==
Reception

Aggregate scores
Aggregator	Score
Metacritic	(PC) 83/100 (XSXS) 87/100
OpenCritic	92% recommend (Note: Based on 103 reviews)

Review scores
Publication	Score
Game Informer	9.5/10
GamesRadar+	4/5
IGN	9/10
PC Gamer (US)	77/100
The Guardian	3/5

Gears of War: E-Day received "generally favorable" reviews from critics, according to the review aggregator website Metacritic. OpenCritic reported that 92% of critics recommended the game.

Reviewers praised its combat, visuals, atmosphere, and emotional storytelling, while criticism focused primarily on its campaign structure, repetition, and exploration. Game Informer described the campaign as one of its favorites of 2026, praising its characters, action, story, and use of Kalona. Pure Xbox awarded the game 10/10, praising its campaign, combat, and cinematic storytelling.

GamesRadar+ compared the game's single-setting structure to Halo 3: ODST, praising how the repeated locations in Kalona allowed players to see the city deteriorate throughout the campaign and become familiar with its environment.

Several reviewers highlighted the game's combat as one of its strongest elements. PC Gamer wrote that E-Day had the best-feeling combat in the series, particularly praising its cover mechanics, weapons, movement, and higher difficulty. It nevertheless criticized the campaign for becoming repetitive and overly long, with similar combat encounters making up much of its more than 20-hour runtime. The game's presentation and atmosphere also received praise. Reviewers highlighted its use of Unreal Engine 5, detailed environments, violence, and darker horror-inspired tone. Meristation praised the game's technical presentation, emotional narrative, movement system, expanded arsenal, and boss encounters, while noting that its larger areas could negatively affect the pacing.

The Guardian was more critical of the campaign, giving the game three out of five stars. The review praised the combat, destructible environments, and visual presentation but criticized the level design for repeatedly sending players through the same environments. It also described the exploration and side missions as underwhelming and argued that the game's structure prevented its strong combat from being supported by sufficient variety. The story and characters received a generally positive response, particularly the relationship between Marcus Fenix and Dominic Santiago and the depiction of Emergence Day.

Some reviewers questioned the decision to revisit the events of Emergence Day as a prequel. PC Gamer argued that the game offered limited new insight into an event already established by the original Gears of War and criticized Marcus's characterization for being too similar to his later incarnation.

The game's semi-open areas received mixed reactions. While some reviewers appreciated having multiple paths, optional objectives, and opportunities for exploration, others considered these sections less effective than the game's more linear sequences. PC Gamer argued that the campaign was strongest when it followed the series' traditional linear structure, while The Guardian criticized the repeated environments and restrictive exploration.

=== Sales ===
The game is estimated to have sold around 230,000 copies on both platforms one week after release, with a further estimated 1.7 million people accessing the game through Xbox Game Pass, according to market analyst firm Alinea Analytics. It is the second best-selling video game in the US in October 2026.

=== Awards ===
Year	Award	Category	Result	Ref.
2026	The Game Awards 2026	Best Action Game	Pending	
2026	The Game Awards 2026	Best Multiplayer	Pending	
2026	The Game Awards 2026	Innovation in Accessibility	Pending	

== Future ==
In an October 2026 interview, The Coalition studio head Mike Crump confirmed that the studio plans to make another Gears of War game. He also suggested fans may not have to wait as long as they did for the previous installment, saying, "The next game will not take nearly as long to make."
