= Ferro (surname) =

Ferro is an Italian and Portuguese surname related to the word ferro ("iron"). People with this surname include:

- Andrea Ferro, singer of Italian metal band Lacuna Coil
- Carlos Ferro (disambiguation)
- Fiona Ferro, French tennis player
- Lorenzo Ferro, Argentine actor and musician
- Marcelo Martinez-Ferro, Argentine pediatric surgeon
- Michael Ferro, American politician
- Michael W. Ferro, Jr., American inventor and philanthropist
- Óscar Ferro, Uruguayan goalkeeper
- Pablo Ferro, American graphic designer
- Peggy Ferro, American healthcare activist
- Raúl Ferro, Uruguayan footballer
- Ridolfo Capo Ferro, Italian fencing master
- Rita Ferro (diplomat), Portuguese diplomat
- Rita Ferro (writer), Portuguese writer
- Robert Ferro, American novelist
- Romina Ferro, Argentine footballer
- Rubén Remigio Ferro, Cuban judge
- Scipione del Ferro, Italian mathematician who first discovered the solution to a generic cubic equation
- Tiziano Ferro, Italian singer and songwriter
