= Lancer Assault Rifle =

Fictional weapon from Gears of War

- A cosplayer carrying a replica of a bloodied Mark 2 Assault Rifle at a gaming convention.
- Publisher: Xbox Game Studios
- First appearance: Gears of War (2006)
- Created by: James Hawkins
- Genre: Third-person shooter

In-universe information
- Type: Firearm
- Affiliation: Coalition of Ordered Governments

The Lancer Assault Rifle, commonly shortened to the Lancer, is a fictional family of firearms in the Gears of War franchise. The best-known model is the Mark 2 Lancer, a mid-range assault rifle fitted with a powered chainsaw bayonet. Introduced in the 2006 video game Gears of War, it is commonly carried by soldiers of the Coalition of Ordered Governments and appears throughout the franchise's games and related media.

Senior concept artist James Hawkins developed the weapon under the direction of Cliff Bleszinski, who wanted the series' default firearm to have an immediately recognizable silhouette and combine ranged combat with the franchise's emphasis on close, graphic violence. The Lancer has subsequently become one of the principal visual symbols of Gears of War and is often described by critics as one of video games' most recognizable weapons. The Lancer inspired licensed replicas, fan-made models, and crossover appearances.

== Description and variants ==
Within the series' fiction, Lancer rifles are standard-issue weapons used by soldiers of the Coalition of Ordered Governments. The Mark 1 Lancer, later known as the Retro Lancer, combines an assault rifle with a conventional blade bayonet. The better-known Mark 2 replaces the blade with a powered chainsaw bayonet which, when accelerated, allows its user to quickly kill nearby enemies. This is usually represented by a short animation where the target is executed by dismemberment.

Later games introduced further variations on the design. Marcus Fenix carries a customized Mark 2 in Gears of War 4. It serves as the in-universe basis for the Mark 3 introduced in Gears 5, which comes in two variants: the standard Mark 3 with a chainsaw bayonet, and the Lancer GL which replaces the chainsaw with an under-barrel system capable of firing laser-guided clusters of grenades with its under-barrel mortar in lieu of a chainsaw bayonet.

== Development ==
=== Original design ===
During development of the original Gears of War, Epic Games decided that the player's default firearm needed to be immediately distinguishable from the large number of conventional guns appearing in other video games. Design director Cliff Bleszinski said the weapon was intended to be "very distinctive, multifunctional and, most importantly, fun to use", with influences including The Evil Dead, Doom, and The Texas Chain Saw Massacre. Epic also sought to give it a distinctive silhouette that could be immediately associated with the franchise.

Senior concept artist James Hawkins produced several concepts for the weapon's melee attachment. Early designs used a circular buzzsaw before the team settled on the chainsaw bayonet. Bleszinski said the developers became convinced by the concept after testing it against Locust enemies and continued refining its sound, visual effects, and physical impact. He described the resulting close-range executions as an expression of the series' emphasis on "intimate violence".

=== Visual revisions ===
For Gears of War 2, artist Pete Hayes rebuilt the Lancer's in-game model. Hayes said the original version had been the first model he created for Gears of War and one of the oldest assets in the finished game. Although its appearance had become closely associated with the franchise, he considered its technical construction inferior to his later work. The sequel preserved the original high-detail design and recognizable silhouette while approximately tripling the polygon count of the lower-detail model, producing a sharper and cleaner asset without substantially altering the weapon's established appearance.

Hayes said the weapon's commercial and visual importance meant that Epic was unwilling to redesign it extensively. The team instead concentrated on increasing its visual clarity and updating details such as its scope, treating it as the series' "hero weapon".

For Gears of War 4, The Coalition added a flashlight to the Lancer. The attachment was intended to support the game's survival-horror-influenced presentation by illuminating enemies while emphasizing their more disturbing visual features.

=== Origin story in Gears of War: E-Day ===
The creation of the chainsaw-equipped Lancer forms part of the story of Gears of War: E-Day. The game's announcement trailer showed Marcus Fenix carrying a Mark 1 Lancer with a detachable conventional bayonet, as the chainsaw version had not yet been invented at that point in the chronology. The Coalition described E-Day as a story of several franchise origins, including that of the Lancer.

In the game, the chainsaw weapon is improvised during the opening phase of the Locust invasion and developed into a battlefield prototype. The Coalition adapted an event involving Tai Kaliso using an ordinary chainsaw against a Locust soldier, moving the event earlier than its position in the tie-in novels so that it could be depicted during E-Day and serve as the immediate inspiration for the weapon.

To reproduce the chainsaw sound associated with the original game, The Coalition obtained the same model of chainsaw used by Epic Games during production in 2006. The developers recorded it alongside additional effects intended to represent the weapon cutting through armour, bone, and flesh.

== Promotion and merchandise ==
The Lancer is a popular subject for Gears of War merchandise, with replica models often offered as standalone purchases or in a retail bundle to promote the release of video game instalments. One of the earliest examples was a life-sized Lancer replica offered by Amazon.com as part of a special Gears of War 2 retail edition bundle for pre-orders of Gears of War II prior to its launch date on November 7, 2008. The replica Lancer is 36 inches long by 10-inches tall, and weighs 13 pounds; its trigger produces chain-saw sounds and a rumble effect. Other examples include 1:1 scale replicas of Lancers by TriForce Sales made from high density foam, fiberglass and polyurethane composites; a yellow "Car No. 13" Lancer with checkered taxi cab accents; and scale replicas of Marcus Fenix's Customized Lancer, including a limited edition gold version, by video game accessory makers PDP.

In 2013, Epic Games auctioned off three signed replica Lancers to help fund the medical expenses of a former Insomniac Games staff member following a hit-and-run car accident.

The Lancer makes a crossover appearance in the 2020 video game Wasteland 3 as an equippable weapon.

== Reception and legacy ==
The Lancer has been interpreted as a distillation of the Gears of War franchise's visual and mechanical identity. Edge described the weapon as violent, cumbersome, grim, and deliberately absurd, arguing that its assault-rifle and chainsaw combination embodied the series' tone while remaining distinctive in a medium dominated by fictional firearms. The publication connected the weapon's characteristics to the games' cover-based combat: its reduced effectiveness at long range encourages players to advance cautiously, while its large magazine supports suppressive fire as they move between positions. Edge also emphasized that the chainsaw bayonet changes the usual function of a shooter melee attack. Rather than allowing a quick defensive strike, it requires the player to rev the weapon, approach an enemy, and risk having the attack interrupted by gunfire. The publication argued that this made each execution slow, deliberate, and personal, reinforcing what Bleszinski described as the franchise's principle of "intimate violence".

Commentators frequently discussed the contrast between the weapon's impractical appearance and its effectiveness within the games. In a 2008 Electronic Gaming Monthly article assessing fictional weapons, military consultant Hank Keirsey criticized the Lancer on the basis that chainsaws are heavy and compared its closest practical precedents to medieval bludgeoning weapons. Nicholas Bashore of Inverse similarly acknowledged that the attachment made little practical sense, but argued that it remained convincing within the fiction and contributed to the satisfaction of the series' close-range combat.

Maddy Myers of Kotaku regarded the weapon as indispensable to the identity and enjoyment of the series. While playing Gears of War 4, she criticized the campaign's initial scarcity of Lancers and its repeated replacement of the weapon with less distinctive firearms, arguing that neither shooting robots nor using substitute weapons produced the same impact as firing and operating its chainsaw against the Locust. Luke McKinney of GamesRadar+ similarly praised the immediate physical and emotional response produced by successfully carrying out a chainsaw execution, regarding the Lancer as more memorable than the other weapons available at the beginning of the games.

Michael Goroff of Electronic Gaming Monthly placed the Lancer within what he regarded as the franchise's broader fetishization of military hardware. He argued that the creativity of Gears of War was concentrated in weapons that remained familiar enough to be recognized as firearms but were sufficiently exaggerated to be treated as ridiculous toys rather than realistic instruments of warfare. Goroff viewed the Lancer's chainsaw bayonet as a prominent example of the series' mixture of military imagery, violence, and comic machismo.

The weapon became closely associated with the franchise shortly after the original game's release. During a 2009 discussion of the series' planned expansion into further games and other media, writer Joshua Ortega called the Lancer "the new lightsaber", reflecting Epic Games' intention that it function as the franchise's defining visual object. Edge later characterized it as one of the comparatively few video-game guns capable of remaining immediately recognizable despite the prevalence of firearms throughout the medium.

A Microsoft employee holding a replica of the Mark 2 Lancer Assault Rifle with its chainsaw bayonet at the Game Developers Conference in 2008.

A cosplayer carrying a replica of the Mark 1 Assault Rifle with its conventional blade bayonet at a video game convention.
