= Gears of War 2 =

2008 video game

- Developer: Epic Games
- Publisher: Microsoft Game Studios
- Producer: Rod Fergusson
- Designer: Cliff Bleszinski
- Programmer: Ray Davis
- Artist: Chris Perna
- Writer: Joshua Ortega
- Composer: Steve Jablonsky
- Series: Gears of War
- Engine: Unreal Engine 3
- Platform: Xbox 360
- Release: November 7, 2008
- Genre: Third-person shooter
- Modes: Single-player, multiplayer

Gears of War 2 is a 2008 third-person shooter video game developed by Epic Games and published by Microsoft Game Studios for the Xbox 360. It is the second installment of the Gears of War series, with lead design by Cliff Bleszinski. The game was released in North America, Europe and Australia on November 7, 2008, and was released in Japan on July 30, 2009. The game expands technically on the previous game by using a modified Unreal Engine 3. The development team brought in comic book writer Joshua Ortega to help write the plot for the game.

In Gears of War 2, the COG continues its fight against the Locust, who are attempting to sink all of the cities on the planet Sera. Sergeant Marcus Fenix leads Delta Squad into the depths of the planet to try to stop the Locust during the assault upon Locust territory. The player controls Fenix in the main mission campaign, with the ability to play cooperatively with a second player controlling Fenix's best friend and fellow Squad member Dominic "Dom" Santiago. The game includes several existing and new multiplayer modes including five-on-five battles between human and Locust forces, and a "Horde" mode that challenges up to five players against waves of Locust forces with ever-increasing strength. New weapons and gameplay mechanics such as "chainsaw duels" and the ability to use downed foes as "meatshields" were added to the game.

On its release weekend, Gears of War 2 sold over two million copies, and within two months of release, had sold four million copies. It was the seventh best selling video game of 2009 and received several accolades. The game received similar praise as its predecessor, with the new gameplay and multiplayer modes seen as outstanding additions. Gears of War 2, along with its predecessor, are considered to be amongst the best games ever made. It was followed by Gears of War 3 in 2011.

== Gameplay ==
Gears of War 2 is a third-person shooter with an emphasis on the tactical use of cover, and retains much of the same gameplay from the first game. The player, playing as either Marcus or Dominic in the campaign mode, or as any of the human or Locust characters in multiplayer mode, can only carry a pistol, one type of grenade, and two other weapons at any time, though they may swap these for weapons found in strategic locations or left by downed foes or fallen allies. Each weapon can be used for normal fire as well as for melee attacks; the game's signature Lancer Assault Rifle can be used to instantly kill foes in melee with its mounted chainsaw bayonet. The game introduces the ability to engage in chainsaw duels should the player attempt to chainsaw an opponent also using the Lancer; the player is presented with a controller button to press rapidly to try to win the duel and avoid death. Gears of War 2 rebalances the power of the existing weapons while introducing five new ones: a flamethrower, a chain gun, a mortar cannon, a "Gorgon" Pistol, and the Ink Grenade. The chain gun and the mortar are heavy weapons, forcing the player to move at walking speed while carrying it in both hands. The Gorgon Pistol is an SMG-like machine pistol that fires four four-shot bursts per magazine. The Ink Grenade doesn't damage with its detonation, but instead temporarily poisons the area it was thrown, making it very useful for driving enemies out of cover. Grenades can be planted on walls or floors as proximity traps that go off when an enemy nears, but only fragmentation grenades have the ability to kill foes when they go off.

The player's health is represented by a red "Crimson Omen" that fades onto the screen the more damage the player takes; staying out of the line of fire allows the player to recover their health. Depending on the game mode or difficulty, if the player takes too much damage, they enter a downed state where they can crawl around the map to get out of battle and seek help. During this time, a teammate can revive him, an enemy may brutally execute the downed player, or the player may bleed out if too much time has passed. The player can also grab a downed character and use them as a meatshield, allowing the body to absorb damage but forcing the player to use a one-handed pistol. Explosive weapons will simply destroy the character they strike. Like its predecessor, Gears of War 2 features an optional mature content filter, which, when active, makes blood appear as sparks and removes harsh language from the dialogue. Furthermore, progress towards most of the Xbox achievements for the game can be earned in either campaign or multiplayer modes.

=== Campaign mode ===
The campaign mode in Gears of War 2 allows for a single player or two players playing cooperatively as Marcus or Dom. A new "Normal" difficulty was added between the game's "Casual" and "Hardcore" difficulties. There is also an 'Insane' difficulty that is unlocked after the player completes the game at least once. Players in co-op mode can select different difficulties, and a "communal combat system" will adjust the game's artificial intelligence to give both players a fair challenge. The co-op campaign can be played in a drop in/drop out manner, with the second player able to join the first player's game in progress. As well as collecting some COG tags as in the first game, players can search other story-based items such as personal letters and medical records, with discovered items being added to a war journal.

The campaign features a deeper story with new characters, new weapons, and new enemies according to John DiMaggio, the voice actor for Marcus Fenix. New vehicles have been added to the game, such as the Centaur Tank, which lead designer Cliff Bleszinski describes as a "tank with monster truck wheels." Players will also ride a Brumak and Reavers in the game. Cut-scenes use the better facial rendering technology of Epic's Unreal engine, and engage in more dramatic angles for the conversation, as well as using a video screen on Jack (the all-purpose robot used by Delta squad) to talk with their commanders face-to-face.

=== Multiplayer ===
Gears of War 2 features an upgraded multiplayer mode that allows up to ten users to simultaneously play in teams of five-on-five. Gears of War 2 includes most of the multiplayer modes, including Execution, Warzone, Annex and King of the Hill, and adds in three new modes. Guardian is a modified version of Assassination from the original Gears of War, but allows players to continue fighting after the leader has been killed, but losing the ability to respawn. Wingman splits all ten players into five teams of two, where both members of a team play as the same character. Submission, formerly known as Meat Flag, is a version of capture the flag in which players attempt to "down" an enemy controlled by the game's AI and move its body to their team's base or objective to earn points. The 10 maps shipped with the game originally are Avalanche, Blood Drive, Day One, Hail, Jacinto, Pavilion, River, Ruins, Security and Stasis. A Halo-like matchmaking system has been utilized for the online multiplayer. Players can now engage in multiplayer scenarios with any combination of human players and artificial intelligence controlled by the game, with the ability to set the AI's intelligence level. Horde is a new co-op mode for five players, fighting off waves of attacking Locust together, with each wave becoming more difficult. Horde Mode does not feature bot support as in competitive multiplayer, and can be played alone.

Players can pan around a map as the camera focuses on areas of intense fighting, and the Ghost Cam allows a player to roam freely around a map. The ability to take photographs is also featured, which enables the player to take a photo, which can be uploaded to the Gears of War website and is rated on the quality of action in the shot.

== Synopsis ==
=== Setting ===
Gears of War 2 takes place six months after the detonation of the Lightmass Bomb at the end of the first game. Though most of the underground army of the Locust Horde was destroyed, the explosion also caused much of the liquid Imulsion underground to vaporize, causing a fatal disease called Rustlung to spread among the diminished human population. After months of peace, the cities of Tollen and Montevado suddenly and mysteriously disappear underground, leading the Coalition of Ordered Governments (COG) to suspect the resurgence of the Locust. Soon after, the once impenetrable Jacinto, one of the last remaining safe havens for humans, begins to show signs that the same fate awaits it. To stop the fall of Jacinto, the COG responds with a large-scale counter-offensive against the Locust. Senior Producer Rod Fergusson says "In order to save Jacinto, [the COG] have no choice but to take the war to the Locust."

=== Characters ===
Returning characters includes the main protagonists of the series Marcus Fenix and Dominic Santiago and others from the first game, including Marcus and Dom's fellow Delta Squad COG soldiers, Augustus 'Cole Train' Cole and Damon Baird. Also returning in supporting roles are radio dispatcher Anya Stroud and senior officer Colonel Hoffman. Lead designer Cliff Bleszinski confirmed that the character Carmine would be returning, but did not reveal how or in what capacity as Carmine was killed in the original Gears of War. It was later revealed that the original Anthony Carmine would not be present in the Gears of War 2 campaign, but rather his brother, Benjamin, would make an appearance. The game also introduces several new characters. They include Chairman Prescott, the noble, yet near-dictatorial military leader of COG; Tai Kaliso, "a spiritual and meditative warrior from a tradition of honor bound fighters;" and Dizzy Wallin, a former Stranded who joined the COG to keep his family safe. Dom's wife Maria also makes an appearance, and Dom's search for her plays an important part in the story.

=== Plot ===
As Gears of War 2 begins, the COG army mobilizes forces to deploy into the depths of Sera, known as the Hollow, to assault the Locust directly. Delta Squad, consisting of Marcus Fenix, Dom Santiago, Benjamin Carmine, Tai Kaliso, Augustus Cole and Damon Baird; fight the Locust alongside thousands of Gears. During the battle, Tai is taken prisoner by Locust general Skorge and is tortured to the point of insanity, resulting in him committing suicide after being rescued by Delta. They discover that the Locust are using a giant Riftworm to sink human cities. The Locust plan to destroy the rock structures in the outskirts of Jacinto, the last major human city, in hopes of sinking it underground. Delta kills the Riftworm from within before it can sink Jacinto, but they lose Carmine in the process.

After returning to the surface, Colonel Hoffman informs Delta that they failed in locating the Locust stronghold, but reveals Chairman Prescott declassified an intel file on an abandoned COG outpost that should have a lead on the location of the Locust capital and their queen. Delta is ordered to investigate and learns that the outpost is the New Hope Research Facility, a genetics lab dedicated to studying human children of Imulsion miners suffering from Rustlung. The experiments there resulted in the children becoming human-animal chimeras called Sires. Delta finds that the New Hope scientists relocated to the nearby caves of Mount Kadar to continue their research after being shut down by the COG. As Delta enters Mount Kadar to infiltrate the Locust stronghold, Dom gets a lead on his missing wife, Maria, located at a nearby prison camp. Dom finds Maria in a vegetative state due to the aggressive and invasive torture techniques of the Locust. Dom euthanizes Maria and continues on the mission.

Delta locates Locust capital, Nexus, and sets off the beacon to initiate the second wave. The COG sees the Locust have been facing an epidemic against the Lambent, Locust and other creatures that have been infected by Imulsion, and have been forcing the Locust out of the Hollow and onto the surface. They locate the Locust queen, a human named Myrrah, and reveals that the Locust are trying to sink Jacinto based on a plan by Marcus's father, Adam Fenix. He believed the surrounding seawater could flood the Hollow and drown the Lambent. After a battle where they succeed in killing Skorge but fail to kill Myrrah, Marcus decides to destroy both the Locust and Lambent forces by sinking Jacinto themselves before the Locust can evacuate. Jacinto is sunk by the COG by killing a Lambent Brumak that explodes upon death, causing seawater to flood into the crater, destroying the remaining Locust forces. After the credits, the voice of Adam Fenix is heard on a radio transmission reacting in horror to the COG sinking Jacinto, revealing he is still alive.

== Development ==
Gears of War designer Cliff Bleszinski has done several interviews to highlight improvements to the game. Heavy Netcode optimization has been done to negate the host advantage problem in the first title and hundreds of tweaks have gone into improving the cover system and movement. To provide a deeper story, the team brought aboard novelist Joshua Ortega as to incorporate more personal drama within the sci-fi setting. Steve Jablonsky provided the music for the game. Epic Games also considered making the game easier after complaints about Gears of War. Senior producer Rod Fergusson admitted that — for the first game — "We overshot on [the Casual] difficulty and a game that was a little harder than we intended."

=== Game engine ===
Comparison of the map "Gridlock" in Gears of War and Gears of War 2

At the 2008 Game Developers Conference in San Francisco, California, as a showcase for the functionality of the Unreal Engine 3, Gears of War creators Epic Games showed various improvements to the engine with specific reference to the sequel itself. The video showed several demonstrations of the improvements, the initial being improvements to the in-game lighting through Screen Space Ambient Occlusion, in which dynamic shadows could be generated through the use of a pixel shading technique to render more realistically lit and shaded objects and actors, illustrated through comparison between character and environment models in the original game engine to that of Unreal Engine 3. Also showcased was the ability of the engine to render hordes of actors within the engine, as demonstrated with a large crowd of locust flocking through the "Gridlock" multiplayer map from the original game. Alongside this technology was improvements to "Matinee," an artistic tool used for the rendering and editing 3-dimensional scenes within the game.

Other physics-related features included improvements to the rendering of water in which specular light and physical interactions with were displayed more realistically, improvements to soft body entities demonstrated with a "Meat Cube" and a floating ball possessing properties similar to that of liquid helium. The largest of these physics engine related changes was the introduction of destructible environments due to the implementation of real-time structural analysis tools to generate the damage of the materials and subsequently their deformed shapes based upon resultant forces placed upon them. This was demonstrated with the use of explosive arrows fired from the "Torque Bow" of the original game causing damage to wooden planks, and also revealing rebar present after destroying areas of a stone structure.

== Marketing and release ==
Screenshot from the first Gears of War 2 trailer shown at the 2008 Game Developers Conference, depicting Marcus Fenix executing a Locust with the chainsaw bayonet

On February 20, 2008, coinciding with the game's announcement at the Game Developers Conference, a free set of gamer pictures and a dashboard theme, as well as a teaser trailer titled "Duel," were made available via the Xbox Live Marketplace. The first footage of gameplay from the campaign, highlighting new features of the game, was released online and to the Marketplace on May 9, 2008. After the Microsoft E3 press conference, the "Rendezvous" trailer and the press conference demonstration was available for download as well as a new free set of gamer pictures and a dashboard theme.

A teaser image posted to the Gears of War 2 website on July 8, 2008, suggested that the game was to be released on November 9, 2008, but it was confirmed during the Microsoft E3 2008 press conference that the game would be released on November 7, 2008. On July 14, 2008, the teaser image was removed and the website relaunched and updated for Gears of War 2.

Gears of War 2 was a focal point during Microsoft's E3 2008 presentation on July 15, 2008, which included a "hands-on" demo. A second trailer, entitled "Rendezvous," was made available on July 14, 2008, as a part of E3. The Joseph Kosinski-directed trailer, which features the Trans Am track "Diabolical Cracker" from the album Red Line, takes its title and spoken words from Alan Seeger's World War I poem I Have a Rendezvous with Death. The game's release date was also set, with a worldwide release to occur on November 7, 2008. Microsoft and Epic Games announced on October 10, 2008, that Gears of War 2 had gone gold. It was stated by Cliff Bleszinski that, unlike Gears of War, the previous installment, Gears of War 2 would not feature a PC port.

=== Limited Edition ===
A Limited Edition of the game was confirmed on February 20, 2008. On July 14, 2008, more information about the Limited Edition's contents was revealed. The edition features alternative cover art, a SteelBook case with a bonus content DVD, a book entitled Beneath the Surface: An Inside Look at Gears of War 2, which includes concept art and story-related information, a keepsake photo of Dominic and Maria, and an exclusive Xbox Live code to unlock a gold-plated Lancer for online play. As a bonus item promoted by electronics store Best Buy, customers who preordered the Limited Edition also received a bonus Remote Control Centaur Tank replica, just like the new vehicle introduced in the game, free of charge.

=== Downloadable content and updates ===
Upon release, every new copy of Gears of War 2 features a code to download the Flashback Map Pack, which includes five enhanced multiplayer maps from the original game. Customers who attended the GameStop "Midnight Madness" game release event received a code to unlock a gold-plated Hammerburst rifle for use in multiplayer and a code for an exclusive Xbox 360 Dashboard theme optimized for the New Xbox Experience.

The first downloadable content released after Gears of War 2 was the Combustible Map Pack, which consists of three new multiplayer maps. This add-on was announced and released on December 15, 2008. The second title update was released on January 21, 2009, featuring several adjustments to gameplay and adding additional Achievements, the patch attempts to correct many of the "glitches" that players have discovered since the game's release.

A third update was applied to Gears of War 2 on March 24, 2009. The update added an experience-based ranking system in which the player is given a numerical value based on their number of experience points, which are gained by shooting or killing enemies in public multiplayer. The update also addressed several issues with matchmaking, including adding bots in place of players who have quit or lost connection to the game.

In early July 2009, Epic Games applied a fourth update to Gears of War 2, which added the ability to gain experience from the multiplayer Horde Mode, as well as applying several more gameplay fixes. On July 28, 2009, the Dark Corners add-on was released. This add-on consisted of seven new multiplayer maps, and an additional campaign chapter that was originally deleted from the game. The deleted scene takes place after Maria's death, where the user can choose to either sneak into the stronghold as Theron Guards or charge in as in the original game, though the level is different from the one that appeared in the final game and features a cameo from a Stranded character from the original Gears.

=== All Fronts Collection ===
On May 6, 2009, Microsoft and Epic Games issued a joint press release announcing the Gears of War 2: All Fronts Collection, to be released on July 28, 2009. The All Fronts Collection was to be sold as a retail package, and would have included all add-ons released for Gears of War 2, a poster, and a strategy guide for the game. In response to complaints that the All Fronts Collection had identical pricing to the Dark Corners add-on, but significantly more content, as well as the All Fronts Collection retail package not being made available in certain regions, Epic Games adjusted the release plan; the All Fronts Collection was released digitally via Xbox Live and the Dark Corners add-on was reduced in price.

=== Stereoscopic 3D support ===
In June 2010 during the Electronic Entertainment Expo 2010 Mark Rein (vice president of Epic Games) was showcasing a tech demo of Gears of War 2 in stereoscopic 3D running on an Xbox 360 thanks to the TriOviz for Games Technology. "This technology's great because it works on normal HD TVs, as well as the very high end 3DTVs," Rein commented to Computer and Video Games. "We're not planning to re-release this in 3D - unless Microsoft want us to - but I'm sure its technology may be keen to put in the games developed by our partners."

In October 2010 TriOviz for Games Technology has been integrated in Unreal Engine 3, allowing to easily convert in stereoscopic 3D, numerous past and upcoming games developed with this engine.

== Reception ==
=== Critical reception ===
Reception

Aggregate scores
Aggregator	Score
GameRankings	93.32%
Metacritic	93/100

Review scores
Publication	Score
1Up.com	A
Computer and Video Games	9.3/10
Edge	9/10
Eurogamer	9/10
Game Informer	9/10
GamePro	5/5
GameRevolution	4.5/5
GameSpot	9.0/10
GameSpy	5/5
GameTrailers	9.5/10
Giant Bomb	5/5
IGN	9.5/10
Official Xbox Magazine (US)	9.5/10
X-Play	5/5
PC Advisor	3.5/5
The Daily Telegraph	9/10

Gears of War 2 received widespread critical acclaim. It currently holds a 93.32% aggregate review score at GameRankings, and a 93/100 from the aggregate review website Metacritic.

While the game has been praised for the addition of a deeper plot than the original Gears of War and being highly polished, reviewers noted that the multiplayer experience did not resemble the previous game especially in its quick pace and enjoyability. IGN noted that while the first four acts of the game were satisfying, in the final act "the last boss is a complete joke and the ending feels just a tad too abrupt," and that there were some bugs and lag in the online multiplayer. Overall, IGN stated that "[Gears of War 2] has its flaws when it comes to the technical side of multiplayer and the last act of the campaign and the voice acting might turn some off. Still, none of that comes close to holding back Gears of War 2 from its destiny: being one of the best games available on the Xbox 360." Also, even though the new plot was praised, critics such as Official Xbox Magazine scrutinized the game's middle acts saying that most of the plot "falls flat."

Both IGN and Eurogamer, among others, positively mentioned the new "Horde Mode" feature, with Eurogamer saying that "Horde is a weighty slab of fun that can turn almost any of them into a time-sink, and the leaderboards are likely to be as compelling a reason to stick with Gears of War 2 as the leveling system has been for Call of Duty 4: Modern Warfare." X-Play praised the game for its "polished cover system" and cooperative campaign mode. X-Play also praised the new weapons and characters and its "brilliant" multiplayer experience. Game Informer called the single-player campaign "satisfying" and called the co-op campaign amazing and goes on to call online multiplayer "an outstanding contrast to team deathmatch or capture-the-flag scenarios."

=== Sales ===
Gears of War 2 has achieved significant success after its release. In its opening weekend, the game sold over two million units, and set a new record for the number of simultaneous players on Xbox Live, with over 1 million people logging on to play the game. The game went on to sell over three million copies worldwide within the first month of its release, and pushed past four million in sales within the first two months. It was the sixth best-selling game of December 2008 in the United States, selling in excess of 745,000 copies. It was also the tenth top-selling game in the United States in 2008, with over 1.3 million copies sold. It received a "Double Platinum" sales award from the Entertainment and Leisure Software Publishers Association (ELSPA), indicating sales of at least 600,000 copies in the United Kingdom. As of May 7, 2009, Gears of War 2 had sold over 5 million units worldwide, bringing the franchise total to 11 million units sold.

=== Awards ===
Gears of War 2 won several awards following its presentation at E3 2008. IGN gave it the awards Overall Best Shooting Game and Overall Best Graphics Technology of E3 2008. Game Critics Awards gave the game Best Action Game of E3 2008. Gears of War 2 also won Best Shooter and Best Xbox 360 Game at the 2008 Spike Video Game Awards.

During the 12th Annual Interactive Achievement Awards, the Academy of Interactive Arts & Sciences nominated Gears of War 2 for "Console Game of the Year", "Action Game of the Year", and outstanding achievement in "Animation", "Character Performance" (Dominic Santiago and Marcus Fenix), "Game Direction", "Game Design", "Online Gameplay", "Sound Design", and "Visual Engineering".

== Sequel ==
On April 13, 2010, on Late Night with Jimmy Fallon, Cliff Bleszinski announced Gears of War 3 and debuted a trailer, titled "Ashes to Ashes." The game is set 18 months after the events of Gears of War 2. It was originally going to be released on April 8, 2011, but was delayed and was finally released on September 20, 2011.
