= Carlos Ferro =

Carlos Ferro may refer to:

- Carlos Ferro (American actor), American actor, voice actor, writer, director, and producer
- Carlos Ferro (Mexican actor) (born 1984), Mexican television actor and music video director
