= Gears 5 =

2019 video game

- Developer: The Coalition
- Publisher: Xbox Game Studios
- Director: Rod Fergusson
- Producer: Christi Rae
- Designers: Matt Searcy; Ryan Cleven
- Programmers: Kate Rayner; Jerry Edsall
- Artist: Aryan Hanbeck
- Writer: Tom Bissell
- Composers: Ramin Djawadi; Crispin Hands
- Series: Gears of War
- Engine: Unreal Engine 4
- Platforms: Windows; Xbox One; Xbox Series X/S
- Release: Windows, Xbox One; September 10, 2019 (Note: The Ultimate Edition was released on September 6, 2019. The standard and collector's editions were released on September 10, 2019.); Xbox Series X/S; November 10, 2020
- Genre: Third-person shooter
- Modes: Single-player, multiplayer

Gears 5 is a 2019 third-person shooter video game developed by The Coalition and published by Xbox Game Studios for Windows, Xbox One, and Xbox Series X/S. It is the fifth main installment of the Gears of War series and the sequel to Gears of War 4. Gears 5 follows the story of Kait Diaz, who is on a journey to find out the origin of the Locust Horde, the main antagonistic faction of the Gears of War series.

The Ultimate Edition for Gears 5 was released on September 6, 2019, while the standard edition of the game was released worldwide on September 10, 2019. Gears 5 received generally favorable reviews from critics who praised the gameplay, campaign, presentation and amount of content, but criticised the story and overall lack of innovation.

== Gameplay ==
The game introduces the Skiff, a vehicle which can be used to navigate the game's open environments.

Similar to its predecessor, the game is a third-person shooter. The player has three weapon slots, which allow them to equip one light weapon and two heavier weapons. The player also has access to explosives such as grenades, and they can use melee weapons such as the Lancer Assault Rifle, a mid-range assault rifle with a fully operational chainsaw for a bayonet. The player can also use the environment to their advantage. In addition to several linear scenarios, the game also features several hub worlds, which can be explored freely on foot or using a vehicle named the Skiff. In the game, the player can complete various side quests, and as the player explores the game's world, they would discover collectibles and essential components needed to upgrade Jack, a robot which accompanies Kait throughout the game. Through upgrading Jack, new skills, such as scanning enemies, cloaking Kait and her squad, stunning enemies, and deflecting bullets using an energy shield, will be unlocked.

In addition to single-player gameplay, the game supports three-player local split screen or online cooperative gameplay. Horde mode also returns in Gears 5, in which five players must work together to fight against 50 waves of enemies. A boss will appear every 10 waves. Players need to select from one of many classes under 4 categories, these categories being Assault, Tank, Support, and Promotional (Scout). Each of whom has classes with their own unique weapons and abilities. Each category has 5 classes. The game also introduces a new three-player cooperative mode named Escape. In Escape, the player assumes control of a "Hivebuster", who voluntarily get captured by the Swarm in order to infiltrate and destroy their hives using Venom Bombs. The players must cooperate with each other and utilize the unique abilities of each character in order to escape and reach an extraction point. The game also features several competitive multiplayer modes including Team Deathmatch, King of the Hill and Escalation. A new mode named Arcade is also available. It was described as a "hero shooter-lite" mode designed for new players or a more casual audience.

== Synopsis ==
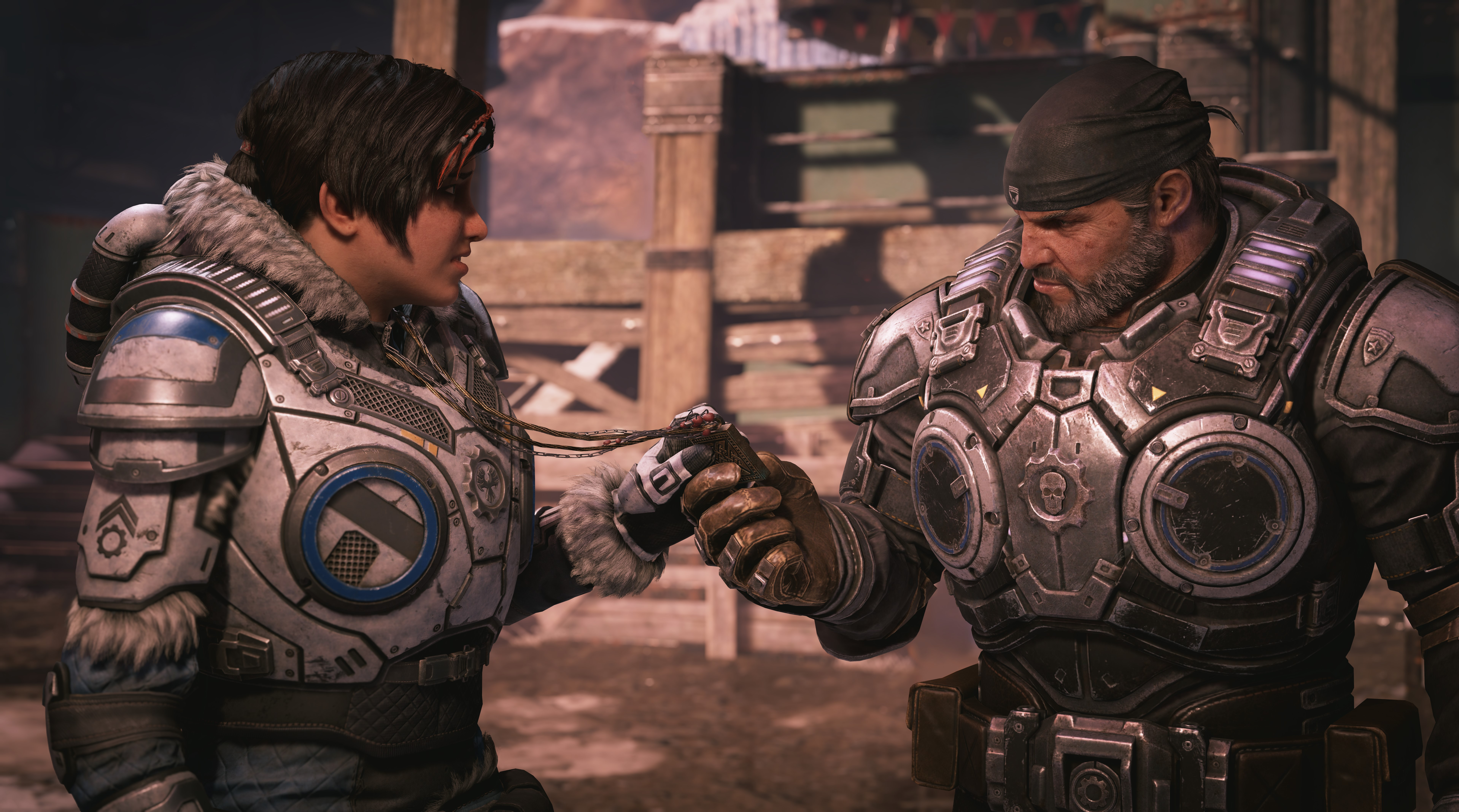
A cutscene depicting a discussion between Kait and Marcus about the former's amulet and family history

Gears 5 is set on the world of Sera and takes place months after the events of Gears of War 4. The majority of its narrative focuses on Kait Diaz (Laura Bailey), originally a member of a human faction known as the Outsiders who resist the totalitarian rule of the Coalition of Ordered Governments (COG), the dominant human nation state in Sera headquartered in the city of New Ephyra. Subsequent events in the narrative forces Kait, who had experienced recurring nightmarish visions after Gears of War 4, to discover the origins of the monstrous Locust Horde that threatened the human civilizations of Sera a generation before, as well as the truth behind her connection to Myrrah (Carolyn Seymour), the deceased Queen of the Locust.

Kait is accompanied by her friend Delmont "Del" Walker (Eugene Byrd) and a robot named Jack for the majority of her journey. Del's best friend James Dominic "JD" Fenix (Liam McIntyre) is the player character for the first chapter of Gears 5. Other important characters include JD's father Marcus Fenix (John DiMaggio (Note: Dave Bautista (who also provides facial capture for Marcus) replaces DiMaggio in every mode in Gears 5, if the Marcus as Batista Override option is enabled in the Campaign mode and/or the Batista skin for Marcus is used in the Versus, Horde and Swarm modes.)); Damon Baird (Fred Tatasciore), a former comrade of Marcus and the creator of Jack; Fahz Chutani (Rahul Kohli), a former friend of JD and Del; and COG First Minister Mina Jinn (Angel Desai). By the events of Gears 5, Kait, JD, Del, and Marcus are officially reinstated in the COG Army and reformed as the new Delta Squad.

=== Plot ===
Delta Squad travels to the ruins of Azura to restore the Hammer of Dawn network, an old orbital laser beam weapon that Delta believes can be used to fight the Swarm. Shortly after their return to New Ephyra, First Minister Jinn directs them to assist in the evacuation of Settlement 2. JD, Del, and Fahz had previously been deployed in Settlement 2 to quell a riot, which resulted in civilian deaths and prompted JD and Del to go AWOL. Fahz reveals that it was JD who gave the orders to kill the civilians, causing Del and Kait to lose their trust in him. As the Swarm threatens to destroy the evacuation convoy, JD orders Baird to fire the Hammer of Dawn prematurely. While the Swarm forces are annihilated, the Hammer of Dawn malfunctions and begins firing wildly, killing Lizzie Carmine and severely injuring JD.

Four months later, Kait and Del go to an Outsider village located in the Riftworm's skeleton to convince them to join the COG. The village chief and Kait's uncle, Oscar Diaz, refuses. The village is suddenly attacked by the Swarm. Kait is captured by a Snatcher and experiences vivid visions of controlling the Swarm forces, compelled by the voice of the deceased Locust Queen, Myrrah. She escapes the Snatcher but is unable to prevent Oscar's death, which she witnesses through her visions. Kait tells Delta about her visions, and Marcus recommends she travel to New Hope, a secret lab Marcus previously investigated to find answers about the Locust. With Del joining her, they go to the lab and learn the facility used the children of Imulsion miners afflicted with Rustlung for genetic experiments. Among the children was a female subject immune to Imulsion's ill-effects and instead grew stronger. The other children were mutated with the DNA of indigenous creatures of the Hollow and transformed into chimeras called the Sires. Kait and Del later find clues leading them to Mount Kadar, the former Locust stronghold, where the scientists and subjects fled to after being shut down by the COG.

Kait and Del locate a secret COG lab hidden beneath Kadar. They find an AI construct of scientist Niles Samson, who explains that the Locust were the result of his experiments by hybridizing Sire DNA with the embryonic stem cells of Myrrah, revealed to be the child at New Hope immune to Imulsion. Because her stem cells were used to create the Locust, she was able to control them through their hivemind. Myrrah later had a human daughter with one of the scientists, but he fled with their child. Niles lied to Myrrah that she was killed in the escape attempt, causing her to revolt and lead the Locust to become independent. The daughter is revealed to be Reyna, Kait's late mother. Kait realizes that the Swarm tried to make Reyna their queen, and now she is the next in line and demands to be separated from the Swarm's hivemind. Niles puts Kait in a brain-computer interface connected to a dormant Berserker called the Matriarch, the original Locust. He successfully severs Kait from the hivemind, but also resurrects Reyna in the process - this having been Niles' true intention. Niles is destroyed by the revived Matriarch, and Kait and Del kill it before escaping the facility. Realizing that Reyna is now the Swarm's queen, Kait reaffirms the COG needs to reactivate the Hammer of Dawn.

A few weeks later, Baird takes the group to the Vasgar desert, where the Union of Independent Republics' secret space program was located. They meet Baird's former squadmate, Garron Paduk, who reveals that the UIR had a rocket loaded with Hammer of Dawn satellites ready to launch. JD and Fahz arrive to help, with JD apologizing to Del and Kait for his previous deception and subsequent behavior. The squad manages to assemble and launch the rocket and acquire targeting beacons to help control the Hammer of Dawn, though they encounter a giant Swarm creature called the Kraken while trying to escape.

At New Ephyra, Jinn attempts to arrest Kait, intending to forcibly reconnect her to the hivemind in order to find the central Swarm Hive. Before she can do this, the Swarm attacks New Ephyra. The Gears attempt to set up the targeting beacons for the Hammer of Dawn, but the Kraken destroys them. The transformed Queen Reyna appears and attacks Kait, JD, and Del. Kait is forced to choose to save either JD or Del, leaving Reyna to kill the other. Kait and the surviving friend fight their way back to New Ephyra, but are attacked by the Kraken. The remaining soldiers are overwhelmed until the squad's robotic companion, JACK, kills the Kraken by sacrificing itself as a targeting beacon. In the aftermath, Marcus tells Kait that Reyna will return. Kait becomes determined that they will find her first before discarding her grandmother's necklace.

== Development ==
Gears 5 is developed by The Coalition as a sequel to Gears of War 4. Unlike previous games in the Gears of War series, the game is simply titled Gears 5 (without "of War" included in the title). Xbox marketing boss Aaron Greenberg explained that the new title was "cleaner" and that it was a natural change because most people had been ignoring "of War" for years. For Gears 5, The Coalition decided to shift player focus from JD Fenix to Kait Diaz. According to studio head Rod Fergusson, "It was a natural choice. When you play through Gears 4, think of it as Mad Max: Fury Road. It was really Furiosa's story, and Max was the side kick. That's how it felt in Gears 4, the whole game is about saving Kait's mom, and really JD is there to help her."

The game received enhancements for the Xbox Series X upon its launch, including higher resolution textures, new visual effects such as volumetric fog, and running at 60 frames per second at minimum with potential to run at up to 120 frames per second.

== Marketing and release ==
Gears 5 was announced at E3 2018, along with Gears Pop! and Gears Tactics. The game was released for Windows 10 and Xbox One on September 10, 2019, as part of Xbox Play Anywhere. It was revealed at E3 2019 that for the game, a crossover with the upcoming film Terminator: Dark Fate would have players control either Sarah Connor with Linda Hamilton providing facial capture and voicing her character and or a T-800 Terminator model as either a pre-order bonus or with Xbox Game Pass and Xbox Game Pass Ultimate. Moreover, action movie actor Dave Bautista appears as a playable character skin for Marcus Fenix for the Versus and Horde modes, as well as the Swarm and Campaign modes (with the latter mode as a togglable option), along with his finisher, the Batista Bomb, as an execution animation for the Gnasher, and his entrance theme, "I Walk Alone" by Saliva, at the start of every Versus Match as him, in limited releases via updates where he uses his gimmick as a WWE professional wrestler, under his ring name, Batista, after expressing interest in portraying Marcus in a potential film adaptation of Gears of War. () In addition to the standard and the ultimate editions, a Gears 5 Limited Edition Xbox One X Console bundle was announced to be released the same day as the game's release. The bundle includes the Ultimate Edition of the game, a Limited Edition Xbox One X console, controller, headset, wireless keyboard, mouse from Razer (for console and PC), external hard drives from Seagate, Gears of War: Ultimate Edition, and the standard versions of Gears of War 2, Gears of War 3, and Gears of War 4.

A single-player expansion for the game, titled Hivebusters, was released on December 15, 2020. The expansion is a direct prequel to the Gears of War: Hivebusters comic book series, and features the playable characters from the Escape multiplayer mode: Lahni, Keegan and Mac. In the pack, the three characters embark on their first mission as a member of the Hivebuster program on the volcanic Galangi islands. Supporting characters include Colonel Victor Hoffman from previous games, Hana Cole, the daughter of Augustus "Cole Train" Cole from Delta Squad and Tak, a King Raven pilot.

A digital exclusive Game of the Year Edition for Gears 5 was released on December 15, 2020. It contains the base game, the Hivebusters expansion, a pack featuring Halo: Reach characters, and a "30 days of boost" pack.

== Reception ==
Reception

Aggregate score
Aggregator	Score
Metacritic	PC: 82/100; XONE: 84/100; XBSX: 83/100

Review scores
Publication	Score
Destructoid	8/10
Edge	6/10
Electronic Gaming Monthly	4/5
Eurogamer	Recommended
Game Informer	8.5/10
GameRevolution	4/5
GameSpot	7/10
GamesRadar+	4/5
IGN	9/10
VideoGamer.com	8/10

Gears 5 has received "generally favorable" reviews, according to review aggregator website Metacritic. Critics praised the gameplay, campaign, presentation and amount of content, but criticised the story and lack of innovation. Many critics praised the game for being a successful return to form for the series.

Ryan McCaffrey of IGN gave the game a 9/10 in a raving review, stating: "It's not surprising at all that Gears 5 is an excellent third-person action game. This iconic series has never really had a misfire, even when changing hands from original developer Epic to The Coalition, and the hot streak remains unbroken. What was unexpected is just how effectively it doubles down on story with a character-focused, consequence-filled tale that plays to one of the franchise's most underappreciated strengths and backs it up with fun, welcome additions to both its gameplay formula and flow. And that's just the campaign: add in a heavy-hitting multiplayer lineup of Versus, Versus Arcade, Horde, and Escape and it makes Gears 5 one of the best and most versatile action-game packages in recent memory."

Andrew Reiner of Game Informer rated Gears 5 a 8.5/10, concluding: "Gears 5 is exactly what it needs to be. This old war vet still packs a punch. The open-world exploration has issues, but that isn't enough to steal away the thunder The Coalition expertly deploys on the battlefield. The campaign is a fun ride that concludes with a shocker moment and a hell of a setup for a sequel. I'm already looking forward to that follow-up."

Wesley Yin-Poole, deputy editor of Eurogamer recommended the game with a 4 star rating out of 5. He concluded: "The campaign really is great. Perhaps even better than great, the more I think about it. All the new things about it - the open world stuff, Jack's powers, the light RPG elements, the side quests - all this stuff was done better years ago by other games. But those other games weren't Gears of War, which has actual decent third-person shooting, actual interesting things happening, and a story that doesn't try hard to win awards. But while Versus, Horde and even Escape are, ultimately, fine, they're let down by the party pooper progression system. The hope is The Coalition tweaks how the battle pass works, because as it stands, Gears 5's grind is depressing."

Phil Hornshaw of GameSpot rated it a 7/10, praising the "open areas" within the campaign and the "character moments" within it. However, he was critical of most of the campaign feeling "inconsequential" after the second act and the campaign feeling like a "rehash of earlier games." He concluded that "Gears 5 is very much a return of those best elements of Gears of War, but with a focus on making the game feel somewhat more adaptive to your particular ways of playing. Whether you want campaign or co-op, Competitive or Quickplay, there's an option for you in Gears 5, and plenty of stuff to reward you for time spent and skill gained. Gears 5 might suffer from some of the same storytelling missteps as its predecessors, and it might not venture far out of the past, but the new ideas it brings to the series are all good reasons for fans to return."

Justin Clark of Slant Magazine gave a rating of 4/5, writing: "Escape stands out in particular because of just how much work has gone into making Gears 5 otherwise accessible. The Gears of War series has been broken of its worst habit: trying to put up the front of being better or harder or more stoic than the rest, allowing the deeper implications of its lore to come to the forefront. Despite dropping “of War” from its title, Gears 5 is the first time the series has made the brutality of its combat feel not only bloody and cathartic, but also captivating and disturbingly intimate on a human level. The quintessential dudebro shooter has evolved with the times, and the world is so much better for it."

Can I Play That?, a games accessibility resource aimed at gamers and developers, praised Gears 5's accessibility features, awarding it a perfect score for deaf accessibility.

=== Commercial performance ===
During its week of release, Gears 5 retail sales in the UK were about 4.5 times less than its predecessor, and placed in second place in the retail UK charts, and fifth in Switzerland. The game was the seventh best-selling game in the US during the month of September 2019. The game was played by 3 million people in its first weekend, making it Microsoft's most successful first-party launch since Halo 4 and the biggest launch for Xbox Game Pass.

=== Awards ===
Year	Award	Category	Result	Ref.
2019	Game Critics Awards	Best Action Game	Nominated	
2019	Game Critics Awards	Best Online Multiplayer	Nominated	
2019	Gamescom	Best Xbox One Game	Won	
2019	2019 Golden Joystick Awards	Xbox Game of the Year	Won	
2019	2019 Golden Joystick Awards	Ultimate Game of the Year	Nominated	
2019	Titanium Awards	Best Action Game	Won	
2019	Titanium Awards	Best Spanish Performance (Olga Velasco)	Nominated	
2019	The Game Awards 2019	Best Audio Design	Nominated	
2019	The Game Awards 2019	Best Performance (Laura Bailey)	Nominated	
2019	The Game Awards 2019	Best Action Game	Nominated	
2020	47th Annie Awards	Best Character Animation - Video Game	Nominated	
2020	Visual Effects Society Awards	Outstanding Visual Effects in a Real-Time Project	Nominated	
2020	23rd Annual D.I.C.E. Awards	Action Game of the Year	Nominated	
2020	NAVGTR Awards	Control Design, 3D	Nominated	
2020	NAVGTR Awards	Game, Franchise Action	Nominated	
2020	NAVGTR Awards	Use of Sound, Franchise	Nominated	
2020	16th British Academy Games Awards	Performer in a Leading Role (Laura Bailey)	Nominated	
2020	18th Annual G.A.N.G. Awards	Best Cinematic Cutscene Audio	Nominated	
2020	18th Annual G.A.N.G. Awards	Best Dialogue	Nominated	
