= Marcus Fenix =

Character in Gears of War video game

- Gears of War character
- Render of Marcus Fenix from Gears of War: Ultimate Edition (2015)
- First appearance: Gears of War (2006)
- Created by: Epic Games
- Designed by: Cliff Bleszinski
- Voiced by: John DiMaggio; Dave Bautista (Gears 5, optional skin)

In-universe information
- Family: Adam Fenix (father); Elain Fenix (mother)
- Spouse: Anya Stroud (wife)
- Children: JD Fenix (son)
- Relatives: Helena Stroud (mother-in-law); Roland Fenix (great-grandfather)

Marcus Michael Fenix is a fictional character in the Gears of War franchise. Introduced as the protagonist of Gears of War (2006), he is the primary playable character throughout the original trilogy before appearing as an older supporting character in Gears of War 4 and Gears 5. A younger version of Marcus appears alongside Dominic Santiago in the prequel Gears of War: E-Day. He is voiced by John DiMaggio.

Marcus is depicted as a heavily armoured soldier of the Coalition of Ordered Governments whose imposing physique and gruff manner contrast with his exhaustion, caution, grief, and reluctance toward violence. Commentary on the character has accordingly ranged from criticism of him as an exaggerated masculine action hero to praise for the vulnerability and emotional weariness beneath his appearance.

His relationship with his father, Adam Fenix, forms a central part of the original trilogy, while his portrayal in the first game's "Mad World" advertising campaign helped establish the franchise's combination of brutality and melancholy.

== Development and portrayal ==
Marcus Fenix was the focus of the "Mad World" television advertisement for the 2006 title Gears of War. The advertisement was conceived as a deliberate departure from the combat-focused marketing then common for video games. Peter Kingsley, a manager in Xbox product marketing, said that Microsoft believed Gears of War needed to present the beauty and richness of its fictional world alongside its violence if it was to become a major Xbox 360 release. The resulting advertisement functioned as a dialogue-free tone piece, depicting Marcus alone and vulnerable in the ruins of Sera rather than presenting him as a triumphant action hero. Its use of Gary Jules's cover of "Mad World" reinforced the melancholy that Cliff Bleszinski had associated with the game while experiencing the breakdown of his marriage and grieving his father, whose absence also influenced Marcus's storyline.

The relationship between Marcus and his father Adam Fenix was conceived as a central element of the original trilogy. During the development of Gears of War 3, executive producer Rod Fergusson described the series as having "always been a father/son story", and said the third game was intended to resolve questions surrounding Marcus, Adam Fenix, and Queen Myrrah that had accumulated across the first two games.

Marcus was considered one of the most difficult returning characters to redesign for Gears of War 3. Cinematic director Greg M. Mitchell and the art team had to update a character who had changed little across the first two games without making him unrecognizable. Because the third game was set during summer, the developers removed some of Marcus's bulky armour to expose more of his skin, while using improved hair, skin-shading, and lighting technology. The team sought to balance demonstrating the newer technology with preserving Marcus's established appearance as the franchise's central character.

For Gears of War: E-Day, The Coalition returned to Marcus shortly after the Pendulum Wars, portraying him as a young veteran attempting to imagine a life outside military service. The game also explores the initially distant relationship between Marcus and Dominic Santiago following the death of Carlos Santiago, Dom's brother and Marcus's closest friend. The developers described this unresolved grief as the emotional starting point for the friendship that later defined the original trilogy. Creative director Matt Searcy said that the game would explore the origin of the bond between the characters, describing themes of shared loss, trust, and loyalty as central to their characterization. Material from Karen Traviss's novel Aspho Fields informed the backstory, and Traviss consulted with The Coalition during development.

Marcus's character model and facial-animation system were also rebuilt for E-Day. The developers used approximately three times as many facial joints as in their previous technology, allowing for more detailed emotional performances, while joking that the younger Marcus's eyelashes contained more visual detail than his entire model in the original Xbox 360 game.

== Appearances ==
=== Gears of War video game series ===
Fenix debuted as the protagonist of Gears of War in 2006. Fenix is a convict who is reinstated into the Coalition of Ordered Governments' (COG) military to assist a last-ditch mission to destroy the Locust Horde. Fenix led a famed military career in the COG's previous conflicts, but was arrested after leading a failed unauthorized mission to rescue his father, Adam. Fenix joins his close friend, Dom Santiago, in Delta Squad as they succeed in helping the COG military deploy a missile strike against the Locust Horde.

Fenix retains his role throughout the trilogy, where he plays a pivotal role in humanity's conflict against the Locust Horde. He cripples the Locust Horde in Gears of War 2 by flooding their subterranean civilization. In Gears of War 3, Fenix discovers his father is alive and has developed a weapon that will destroy the Locust Horde and a new threat, the Lambent. Adam releases his weapon but dies in the process. While successful in vanquishing humanity's enemies, Fenix is distraught over the death of his loved ones and comrades, including Dom and his father. He is consoled by Anya Stroud, one of his closest allies and love interest, who assures him their sacrifices have given humanity a new hope.

Character design of an older Marcus adopted from Gears of War 4 onwards

Fenix transitions into the role of a supporting character in 2016's Gears of War 4, set 25 years after the events of Gears of War 3. Fenix has fathered a now adult son with Anya, James Dominic "JD" Fenix, who serves as the game's protagonist. In Gears 5, Fenix returns to active service with COG to fight a new foe, the Swarm. During a heated exchange between Marcus and COG First Minister Mina Jinn, it is revealed that Anya had died at some point during the 25-year antebellum period due to unspecified birthing complication issues.

In Gears of War: E-Day, set fourteen years before the first Gears of War, a younger Marcus and Dominic Santiago encounter the Locust Horde during Emergence Day. The story follows the beginning of their partnership while they fight through the collapse of the city of Kalona.

=== Other games ===
He was also included as a playable character in Lost Planet 2. Fenix and Kait Diaz were added as cosmetic outfits to Fortnite Battle Royale in December 2021.

=== Novels ===
Fenix is also the protagonist of Gears of War: Aspho Fields, a novel that expands his backstory while also providing a tie-in between the first two Gears of War games. He appears as the main protagonist of several follow-up books mostly taking place between Gears of War 2 and Gears of War 3.

== Promotion and merchandising ==
In the "Mad World" television advertisement, Marcus is depicted as fleeing through the ruins of Sera, before being cornered by a Locust monster called a Corpser.

Marcus was also used as the centrepiece of the Gears of War 3 Epic Edition, which included a limited-run statue designed by Epic Games art director Chris Perna and manufactured by TriForce.

== Reception ==
Marcus has received a mixed but enduring critical response. Tom Bissell of The New Yorker distinguished him from more impersonal or uncomplicated video-game protagonists, emphasizing the contrast between his exaggerated physique and his displays of caution, fear, exhaustion, and reluctance toward violence. Bissell considered John DiMaggio's vocal performance important to the character, interpreting Marcus's growl as weary rather than simply aggressive, and described the character as a disappointed adult rather than a conventional triumphant action hero. Other critics viewed Marcus as emblematic of the gruff and exaggerated action protagonists common during the Xbox 360 era. Jesse Schedeen of IGN included him among the most overrated video-game characters, arguing that his personality consisted primarily of grunting, shouting, and shooting, and that his prominence did not necessarily amount to meaningful characterization. Computer and Video Games similarly criticized his constant grumbling and described him as one of PC gaming's least likable protagonists.

The "Mad World" advertisement's contrast between Marcus's massive, heavily armed appearance and his fear and isolation became an early expression of the tension between exaggerated masculinity and sadness that later critics identified in the character and the wider series. Bissell credited the use of Gary Jules's mournful cover of "Mad World" with creating a dissonance between the character's physical appearance and the advertisement's vulnerability. A later retrospective in The Guardian similarly described the advertisement as an expression of the game's "destroyed beauty" aesthetic and underlying sadness, contrasting its somber presentation with the violence of the finished game. Brett Hocker of Hammer Creative described the campaign, with Marcus as its centerpiece, to be a watershed moment that helped make video-game releases feel like cultural events through world-building and storytelling.

Reviewing Gears of War 3, Ben Kuchera of Wired framed the conclusion of Marcus's original storyline around accumulated sacrifice and loss. He wrote that the game's characters appeared accustomed to doing little beyond surviving, fighting, and remembering the dead, and interpreted its ending as asking what remains for soldiers after the war has taken everything from them.

Marcus's portrayal in Gears of War 4 drew further attention for repositioning him as a father and ageing war veteran. The A.V. Club described the older Marcus as a no-nonsense but empathetic presence who assumed a paternal role toward the younger cast as a whole, rather than only toward JD. Brett Makendoski from Engadget argued that the older character represented a soldier who had outlived the conflict that had defined him. In Polygon's selection of notable video-game characters of the 2010s, writer Charlie Hall said that Marcus had developed from an over-the-top infantryman into a more nuanced, older, and wiser figure, and that the character had grown on him over the course of the decade. Destructoid writers also commented on Marcus's transition from soldier to husband and father. Steven Hansen focused on what the revelation that Marcus had fathered JD implied about the character's previously unexplored private life, while Brett Makedonski later regarded the strained relationship between Marcus and JDas one of the game's most important personal storylines.

Marcus has also remained closely associated with the Xbox brand and the identity of the Gears of War franchise. In a 2008 ranking of Xbox characters, The Age placed him third and described him as a wounded or emotionally deadened figure beneath his violent and imposing exterior. He also placed nineteenth in a 2011 reader poll published by Guinness World Records Gamer's Edition.
