= Video games in Poland =

Poland is a major video game market and home to one of the largest video game industries in the world. In 2022, Poland became the world’s fourth largest exporter of video games, and Polish publicly traded gaming companies were worth over €12 billion. The game studios in the country employ around 10,000 people and release almost 500 new games annually.

CD Projekt, developer of The Witcher franchise, including The Witcher 3: Wild Hunt – one of the best-selling video games of all time, as well as Cyberpunk 2077, is based in Poland. A significant portion of the Polish population plays video games, and Poland is the home to a developing esports market. In 2019, owing to the industry's growing importance in the country, the Warsaw Stock Exchange (WSE) dedicated an index to it, the WIG Games Index, as part of the exchange’s strategy to attract technology companies. By the end of 2020, the number of gaming companies listed on the WSE had risen to 54, the most in the world, surpassing the previous leader, the Tokyo Stock Exchange.

== Market ==
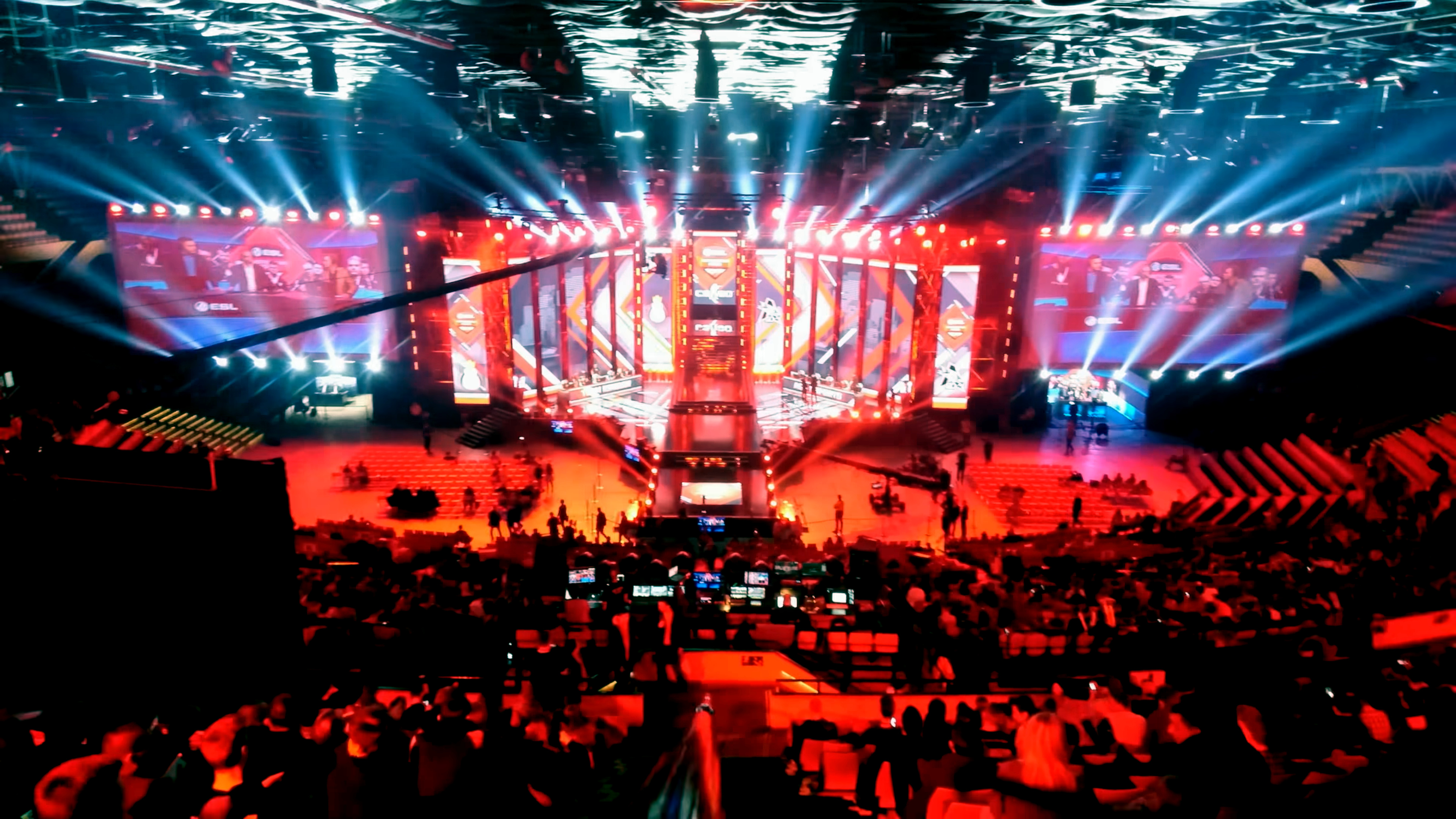
2018 Intel Extreme Masters in Katowice

As of 2021, 97% of spending on video games in Poland is spent on foreign titles. The Polish gaming market was valued about US$924.2 million in 2020, with an esports market valued at US$11.5 million. Of game localizations on Steam, Polish typically ranks between the 9th or 10th most popular language of localization. There are 20 million video game players in Poland; of this group, over 80% are adults and about 49% are women.

The Polish video game market has been described as emerging from the practice of trading pirated video games as a way of experiencing western culture under the Polish People's Republic. Poland hosts the esports tournament Intel Extreme Masters, which draws hundreds of millions of viewers. Among Polish citizens interested in esports, FIFA, League of Legends, and Counter-Strike were the most popular games as of 2020. Notable esports players from Poland include Counter-Strike player NEO and Quake player Av3k.

== Development ==
As of 2021, 96% of revenue in the Polish gaming industry comes from exporting video games to foreign countries, and the Polish gaming industry employed 12,110 people across 470 game companies. The largest video game company in Poland is CD Projekt. CD Projekt is most well known for developing action role-playing games, such as The Witcher video game series and Cyberpunk 2077. CD Projekt also operated the global video game distribution platform GOG.com until 2025, when it was sold back to CD Projekt and GOG co-founder Michał Kiciński. In 2019, Poland was the largest video game exporter in Europe and the fourth largest in the world, largely due to the success of The Witcher. The Polish government has invested into the country's video game industry and sees it as a vehicle for growth. Heavy emphasis on math in the Polish school curriculum has also been credited for the success of Poland's video game industry.

Important early Polish video games developed in the 1990s include Tajemnica Statuetki (The Mystery of the Figurine), Teenagent, The Prince and the Coward and Gorky 17 by Metropolis Software as well as Mortyr by Mirage Media.

As the Polish gaming industry started to rapidly grow over the course of next decades, a number of Polish video game studios have developed video games to international acclaim. Flying Wild Hog is the developer of Hard Reset, the Shadow Warrior series, Trek to Yomi and Evil West. Techland was the developer of Call of Juarez, Dead Island, Dead Island: Riptide, Dying Light and Dying Light 2. People Can Fly is the developer of Painkiller, Bulletstorm, Gears of War: Judgement and Outriders. The Astronauts is the developer of The Vanishing of Ethan Carter and Witchfire. One More Level is the developer of Ghostrunner and Ghostrunner 2. Reikon Games developed Ruiner and Metal Eden. Teyon developed RoboCop: Rogue City. SUPERHOT Team made Superhot. Gruby Entertainment made Deadlink. Bloober Team has developed several horror games, including Layers of Fear, Blair Witch, The Medium, Observer and Silent Hill 2. Ten Square Games has developed several successful mobile games. CI Games is the developer of the Sniper: Ghost Warrior franchise including such games as Sniper Ghost Warrior 3 and Sniper Ghost Warrior Contracts 2. Reality Pump developed Two Worlds II. The Farm 51 is the developer of NecroVisioN, Painkiller: Hell & Damnation and the science fiction survival video game Chernobylite. Destructive Creations developed an isometric shoot 'em up video game Hatred.

11 Bit Studios was the developer of This War of Mine, Frostpunk, with its sequel Frostpunk 2 and The Alters. The Polish government placed This War of Mine on the official school reading list in 2020, making it the first video game to be put on such a list by a national government. The Polish game development industry has been praised for contributing to and spreading Poland's cultural heritage.

== Notable Polish video games ==
This is a list of notable video games that were primarily developed in Poland and sold at least one million units.

| Title | Release date | Developer | Ref |
|---|---|---|---|
| Against the Storm | December 8, 2023 | Eremite Games | |
| Cyberpunk 2077 | December 10, 2020 | CD Projekt Red | |
| Dead Island | September 6, 2011 | Techland | |
| Dying Light | January 27, 2015 | Techland | |
| Dying Light 2 | February 4, 2022 | Techland | |
| Frostpunk | April 24, 2018 | 11 Bit Studios | |
| Frostpunk 2 | September 20, 2024 | 11 Bit Studios | |
| Gears of War: Judgment | March 19, 2013 | People Can Fly | |
| Green Hell | September 5, 2019 | Creepy Jar | |
| Ghostrunner | October 27, 2020 | One More Level, Slipgate Ironworks | |
| House Flipper | May 17, 2018 | Red Dot Games, Empyrean Games | |
| Manor Lords | April 26, 2024 (EA) | Slavic Magic | |
| Outriders | April 1, 2021 | People Can Fly | |
| Sniper Ghost Warrior 3 | April 25, 2017 | CI Games | |
| Superhot | February 25, 2016 | SuperHot Team | |
| Superhot VR | December 5, 2016 | SuperHot Team | |
| The Vanishing of Ethan Carter | September 26, 2014 | The Astronauts | |
| This War of Mine | November 14, 2014 | 11 Bit Studios | |
| The Witcher | October 26, 2007 | CD Projekt Red | |
| The Witcher 2: Assassins of Kings | May 17, 2011 | CD Projekt Red | |
| The Witcher 3: Wild Hunt | May 19, 2015 | CD Projekt Red | |
| Timberborn | September 15, 2021 | Mechanistry | |

== Video game companies of Poland ==
=== Developers ===
- Anshar Studios S.A. (Also co-dev)
- Flying Wild Hog
- Fool's Theory
- Jukai Studio
- Jutsu Games
- Madmind Studios
- Moon Punch Studio
- Nibris
- Nicolas Games
- Northwood Studios
- People Can Fly
- Plata Games
- Rage Quit Games
- Reality Pump Studios (Ex-TopWare Programmy in 1995-2001.)
- Rebelmind
- Render Cube Sp. z.o.o. (Also co-dev)
- Star Drifters
- SuperHot Team
- Superkami S.A.
- The Astronauts
- The Farm 51
- Thing Trunk (Founded by ex-Twin Bottles & Codeminion staff)
- Umeo Studios
- Vile Monarch
- Vivid Games
- Wastelands Interactive (Also co-dev)

=== Misc ===
- Dream Machines sp. z o.o. (Gaming peripherals maker)

=== Co-development ===
- Mataboo sp. z o.o (Dev, co-dev, porting)
- Black Drakkar Games sp. z o.o (Dev, co-dev)
- Roboto Sound (Ex-Studio Sound Tropez Sp. z o.o. in 2008-2020)
- VRAAR S.A. (Dev, co-dev (VR/AR))

=== Defunct developers ===
- Alien Artefact Team (2002-2003. Worked with Mirage Interactive.)
- Can't Stop Games (Founded 2007. Defunct in 2013. Online games.)
- Detalion (defunct 2005. Not same as 2018's Detalion Games S.A.)
- Metropolis Software (Founded 1992. Defunct 2009.)
- Mirage Media S. C. (Founded 1988. Defunct 2000. Not same as Swedish dev, "Mirage Game Studios".)
- Shortbreak Studios s.c. (Founded 2013. Defunct 2016. Mostly mobile.)
- Twin Bottles (Founded 2006? Inactive 2016. Website down 2018. Former publisher.)

=== Publishers ===
- Anshar Publishing Sp. z o.o. (Publishing arm of Anshar Studios)
- BoomHits (Mainly mobile & casual. Part of BoomBit Group.)
- Feardemic Sp. z o.o. (Publishing arm of Bloober Team)
- Games Operators S.A.

==== Publisher and development firms ====
- 11 Bit Studios
- All in! Games
- Blacktorch Games
- Bloober Team S.A. (Former porting role)
- BoomBit (Ex-Aidem Media in 1997-2018. Mainly casual & mobile. Games sold under new name in 2015.)
- CD Projekt
- CI Games
- CreativeForge Games
- Creepy Jar
- Dark Point Games S.A.
- Destructive Creations
- EXOR Studios
- Infinite Dreams Inc. (Mostly casual)
- LK Avalon
- Mechanistry
- Plarium (Polish branch)
- Tate Multimedia
- Techland
- Ten Square Games (Mobile & sim games)

==== Defunct publishers ====
- California Dreams (Founded 1987. Defunct 1991.)
- Codeminion (Founded 2000. Closed 2020. Publisher & dev: core & casual games.)
- PLAY Sp. z o.o. (Founded 1994. Ceased game publishing after 2017. Ex-"Play.pl" in 2001 to 2007; also "PLAY-publishing.com" in 2004-2017. Its CFO later founded PlayWay.)
- Black Eye Games (Founded 2012. Closed 2023.)

=== High-volume firms ===
Otherwise colloquially known as 'Assembly factories' of the industry. These firms have the record and reputation of making and/or releasing/publishing one too many game titles per year, which can lead to dilution of their quality or highly variable results. Some of them, like PlayWay, particularly like to make numerous life/job simulation games. Some others, like Forever Entertainment, also make many console ports, including remakes, though not exclusively.

- Gaming Factory S.A.

==== Publisher and development firms ====
- Art Games Studio S.A.
- Atomic Jelly
- Drago Entertainment
- Forestlight Games
- Forever Entertainment (Publisher, dev & porting)
- Live Motion Games SA
- Movie Games S.A. (Publisher & former dev)
- PlayWay S.A. (Founder previously was CFO at then-defunct PLAY Sp. z.o.o.)
  - Ultimate Games S.A.
    - Manager Games S.A.
    - SIG Publishing (Smaller budget & lower rated titles under Ultimate Games)

== See also ==
- Economy of Poland
- Culture of Poland
- List of best-selling video games

== Bibliography ==
- Rutkowski, Eryk; Marszałkowski, Jakub; Biedermann, Sławomir (2021). The Game Industry of Poland — Report 2021 (PDF) (Report). Polish Agency for Enterprise Development.
