= Tajemnica Statuetki =

1993 video game

- Developer: Metropolis Software House
- Publisher: Metropolis Software House
- Designers: Adrian Chmielarz; Grzegorz Miechowski; Andrzej Michalak
- Platform: DOS
- Release: February 12, 1993
- Genre: Adventure
- Mode: Single-player

Tajemnica Statuetki is a Polish-language adventure game developed and published by Metropolis Software House for DOS-based computers in 1993. While it was never released in English, it is known in the English-speaking world as The Mystery of the Statuette. The game was conceived by a team led by Adrian Chmielarz, who used photographs taken in France as static screens within the game. The first title in the adventure game genre that was produced in Poland, its plot revolves around a fictional Interpol agent named John Pollack trying to solve a mystery associated with the thefts of ancient artifacts around the world.

At the time of the game's release, software piracy was rampant in Poland; the game, however, sold between 4,000 and 6,000 copies, becoming very popular there. Tajemnica Statuetki was praised for its plot and for being a cultural milestone that helped advance and legitimise the Polish gaming industry despite attracting minor criticism for its game mechanics and audiovisual design. The game found warm reception from both the gaming community and from industry magazines which tended to focus on the title's positives.

== Gameplay ==
The gameplay requires players to combine actions with either items or the world to create action. The backgrounds use photos to portray scenes throughout the narrative, including its occult-themed finale.

Tajemnica Statuetki is shown from a first-person perspective. It is a point-and-click adventure game that consists of a series of photographic images, although most information is communicated with text. The game is divided into three chapters, each of which takes place in a different location.

Players solve puzzles and interact with characters to progress through the story. The menu offers six different actions, equipment, and a map. The player uses the action commands in a manner similar to LucasArts adventures. The player completes actions by clicking a command button then either an inventory item or a part of the room screen.

Often, progression through the game requires the player to locate objects the size of a single pixel on the monitor; this is known as pixel hunting. The game's puzzles call on the player's knowledge of varying fields, such as cocktail recipes; the player is, for example, tasked with ordering a drink of the correct composition for a tourist.

== Plot ==
When religious artifacts from around the world, often with insignificant market value, start to disappear, Interpol realises it is not the work of a dishonest collector. Clues lead suspicion to fall upon commando and former CIA agent Joachim Wadner, who appears unhelpful but intelligent. To catch the thief, Interpol chooses their best trainee, protagonist and playable character John Pollack, a young American of Polish descent. Pollack has unlimited funds at his disposal, complete a Rubik's Cube in under three minutes, and can kill with his bare hands. He takes his gadget briefcase, boards a submarine, and sails to the Pacific Ocean.

Pollack follows Wadner to San Ambrosio, an island off the coast of Chile. He completes a reconnaissance mission at a cafe by working there for weeks to complete trained movements like placing a napkin on a counter. During this time, the cafe changes ownership but there is no progress on the case. Pollack interrogates a bartender, who says Wadner has recently been there. Players can choose to mix a range of cocktails for Pollack. Wadner visits a beach and watches three young girls, none of whom pay any attention to him. At one point, the player is captured and tasked with escaping from a cell, a task that requires the splitting of doors, their frames and handles, the use of electricity to paralyse a guard, and to counteract throat dryness caused by drinking from a puddle. From this point on, the quest continues through cities and tourist centers, and the crime eventually takes on a satanic, occult feel.

== Development ==
It was an adventure game "Tajemnica Statuetki". I collected the photos for it in Saint Tropez, not really believing that they were usable, because the shots included a buddy with whom I went. However, when I got them together and started programming, it was necessary to remove him pixel by pixel from these photos

– Adrian Chmielarz on the game's production

Tajemnica Statuetki was conceived by Adrian Chmielarz. Sometime during the 1990s, he figured out that the time was right for him to create the first Polish adventure game. He "and a few friends hatched a plan to take photographs from his vacation to France and turn them into a video game". The group realised they could service the untapped Polish software market, where many people had PCs but were unable to become immersed in adventure games because they did not understand English. Chmielarz was not worried about the Polish gaming market being small because the market had already been tapped by developer X-Land and realised the market had potential, noting the number of people who attended conventions. This project evolved into Tajemnica Statuetki.

The game was conceived by Chmielarz after he visited Côte d'Azur, photographing the area and building a plot around his experiences. He and his high school friends, Grzegorz Miechowski and Andrzej Michalak, collaborated on the game. Chmielarz took on a directing-scriptwriting role and set the creative tone.

According to Miechowski, until March 1993, Chmielarz wrote sixteen hours daily for the game. Miechowski dealt with business stakeholders and marketing while Michalak applied physiognomy to the production. Miechowski and his brother were responsible for sales and logistics; they collaborated with computer companies Optimus and JTT. Miechowski and Michalak financed the project by selling computers. Marcin M. Drews, who took some of the photographs for the game, is often mistaken for the game's creator.

=== Design ===
The use of photographs was widely covered by critics upon the game's release, however early in its development, Tajemnica Statuetki was supposed to have hand-drawn backgrounds, with various storyboards and concept art already completed when the decision was made.

While Tajemnica Statuetki was initially supposed to have hand-drawn graphics, during development the game was altered to instead use digitised photographs as static screen backgrounds. Up until that point, graphic designers had spent many hours on concept art and storyboards. This was atypical for the industry at the time, where it was the norm to see moving protagonists and diverse locations on the screen. The choice resulted in a game consisting entirely of photographic material, which had to be properly rendered so the game could fit onto no more than two floppy disks. This was necessary to minimise its cost to consumers to the point at which they would be willing to legally buy it. The developers also cut costs by opting to include photos instead of having animated video sequences. According to Chmielarz, "we were indie before it was cool, so to speak". According to Antyweb, the game's development was successful despite a shoestring budget, noting Chmielarz' "initiative" of using "home-made methods" when he did not have access to multiple Elwro and IBM XT computers. During development, he was living in Wroclaw.

The game was written entirely in Assembler, had a one megabyte source text, and contained 2,000 loops, altogether around 30,000 commands. The title, typical of point-and-click adventures, requires the player to control the main character with a mouse. Photographs in the game were taken at the Côte d'Azur, Saint Tropez, Monte Carlo, Nice and the abandoned Calvinist church and cemetery in Jędrzychowice, Strzelin. The team went to these locations specifically for the game, where they took as many photographs as possible.

The game's soundscape includes effects such as closing doors and glasses being wiped. Chmielarz inserted references to mass culture, for instance James Bond. To make the game more appealing, the developers added a skill-based section that players could skip if they wanted to. The final segment of Tajemnica Statuetki has a sense of fun that emulates the lighter sides of the game's production; it is a "mix of horror and thriller" according to OnlySP, and mix of sensation, humour, and occultism according to Chmielarz. A "youthful fantasy" can be observed during a meeting with the main opponent, performing a magical ritual in a fiery circle made of birthday candles. According to Miechowski, the game was made with the motto "Teach with fun, play with learning", and this educational slant was acknowledged by Nie tylko Wiedźmin, which said the game is responsible for its players, decades later, knowing how to make good cocktails as the result of its in-game puzzle.

Chmielarz's design philosophy was to create a game similar to those released in the West; according to Komputer Świat, at the time of the game's development, the Polish computer industry was five years behind that of the West, and Polish titles were generally clones of then-popular Western video games. Tajemnica Statuetki is comparable to late 1980s adventure games. Secret Service agreed, saying the game visually resembles point-and-click adventure Countdown (1990) and interactive fiction adventure Amazon (1984) due to their similar menu systems and use of digitized images. Many critics acknowledged the limitations of the game in terms of the size of the country's video gaming industry at the time. One magazine reminded its readers not to make comparisons between the game and the latest titles from adventure gaming giants like Sierra On-Line, LucasArts, Infogrames, and Delphine, due to the "tremendous" gaps in "experience, financial and technological resources, infrastructure, and legal protection" that would gradually close.

== Release ==
The authors of Tajemnica Statuetki and the editors of Secret Service thank everyone on the commodity exchange that have decided not to distribute the pirated version of the game.

- An addendum to a Secret Service interview with the game's creators, noting the state of piracy at the time of the game's release.

Development of Tajemnica Statuetki was finished by February 12, 1993; at the end of that year the game was released onto the market at a price of 231,000 Polish zlotys. During the game's development, the team approached publishers Atlantis Software and Avalon Interactive (then called Virgin Interactive) but were turned down. Chmielarz got IPS Computer Group to distribute and market it but the company agreed to take only 100 copies rather than the 2,000 the creators had offered; as a result, Chmielarz founded his own company to sell the rest of the stock. The name of his publishing company, Metropolis Software, was chosen because "it sounded nice". Founded in 1992 in preparation for the game's release the following year, it became one of the first Polish video game companies after contemporaries such as Computer Adventure, Studio, and X-Land.

Chmielarz boxed the games in packaging he had designed himself. Each box contained two HD floppy disks with the program and extra material. The latter included a copy of the fictional newspaper Dziennik Metropolis dated October 1; the articles presented the game's plot and contained anti-piracy safeguard information, self-referential humour and an advertisement for future release Teenagent, a tiny crossword puzzle, and secret codes for use in the game.

Tajemnica Statuetki became the company's premiere title. Metropolis Software posted advertisements throughout industry magazines. One issue of Secret Service contained a review that included an interview with the authors, a competition, and an advertisement. Competition entrants could win computer equipment and books. The team also advertised in the press. Geezmo thought the game's commercial success was largely due to a "deliberate, well-thought-out media campaign" that included the sale of CDs attached to a popular magazine.

Sales of the game exceeded the estimates of IPS and the creators' expectations. Chmielarz sold between 4,000 and 6,000 copies (Note: Number of sales varies according to estimates: 4,000, 5,000, over 5,000, or over 6,000 copies) by mail at a time when moving just 1,000 or 2,000 units was considered a major achievement. With the profits of the initial sales, Chmielarz was able to run Metropolis Software for two years without financial difficulty.

Western hits had rarely achieved such level of sales. The market was also still dominated by rampant piracy. At a time where democracy and capitalism were being introduced to Poland, and in which The Software Protection Act was coming into effect in 1994, players were not used to paying high amounts for original games. Polish developers had become accustomed to players pirating their games and continued to spend months on titles despite little return. According to Chmielarz, the main reason for this cultural landscape was the commodity exchange he himself came from; he was very critical about pirates, particularly those who had tried to hack his game. Despite being frequently pirated, a sizable number of units were sold legally. SS-NG (Secret Service - Next Generation) puts Tajemnica Statuetki's success in a piracy-prone market to it being reasonably cheap and comparable in quality to English-language adventure games.

== Reception ==
Reception

Review scores
Publication	Score
Secret Service	92%
SS-NG	7/10
Gry Online	8.2/10

=== Writing and plot ===
Tajemnica Statuetki appeared at an unusually good time. People were delighted with the adventure, and the graphic design, which depicted extremely phenomenal landscapes, had a positive effect. It was an interesting alternative to gray-gray, Polish life. Well, you can not forget this specific atmosphere of a crime story mixed up with carefree Saint Tropez life.

- MiastoGier on why the game captured the imaginations of its players

Tajemnica Statuetki's plot and writing were highly praised; according to Video Games Around the World, its overall positive reception was mostly due to the strength of its script. Gry Online praised the "greatly realized scenario" that held up the narrative while Gra.pl said the best element of the game was its plot and MiastoGier said the game's engaging story outweighs its negatives. GameDot said the title "still surprises with its brilliance in the description of the surroundings and the structure of dialogues (very modeled on LucasArts productions) that bring to mind solid literary material".

SS-NG wrote that the Polish language was "professionally implemented" without spelling and stylistic errors and thought the game struck a balance between humour and bleak, horror-filled scenarios. SS-NG also said the narrative and gameplay were well thought-out and hold up, and added that the clever mix of humour and drama effectively break the suspense with laugh-out-loud moments. Secret Service said the game's strongest asset is use of Polish language, including idiosyncrasies such as noun declensions and references to Polish jokes, stereotypes and culture. According to Benchmark, the "professional, tense thriller" is highly original and owes much of its success to the period in which it was released, when technological imperfections were compensated for by strong concepts.

According to Orange, players appreciated the intriguing scenario and attention to detail and the game would attract new fans as of 2014. Polygamia said players appreciated the game's engaging scenario, high-class criminal intrigue, and thoughtful production. According to Dawno temu w grach, the game did not delight but its strength was the execution of its well-constructed and -written scenario, which hold the player in suspense until the end. Bastion Magazynów wrote despite its status as the only Polish-language adventure game, its only draw was its well-constructed plot. According to Geezmo, the "well-thought-out and moderately addictive storyline" was considered atypical at the time and both a curiosity and a novelty.

Neskazmlekiem said the convoluted description of escaping from the cell, including the passage "spit so long until it dries in your throat", justified the description of Chimielarz as "the greatest Polish sadist in the gaming market". While noting its lack of a complicated plot and well-constructed characters, Polskie Gry Wideo wrote that the game offers hours of entertainment. Valhalla wrote that the plot of 2002's photographic adventure game A Quiet Weekend in Capri sounded "even worse" than that of Tajemnica Statuetki. While noting that the interesting, occult-inspired plot was well received, even outside Poland, the reviewer at Gameplay questioned the point of the titular statuette in the story. SS-NG wrote that the game has a great atmosphere.

Gambler wrote that the game was a "very successful program" that was somewhat modelled on Sierra's Quest series. Gry.impo said the game was twisted, commenting that it burst with atmosphere and cult-oriented puzzles.

=== Gameplay ===
Tajemnica Statuetki's gameplay had a mixed reception from reviewers. Gry Online opined the game is demanding and requires players to have patience and an open mind to find absurd solutions to puzzles. Despite its difficulty, SS-NG urged players to stick with it, noting that even today it will provide hours of entertainment. Polygamia wrote that while the game is not technically proficient, it was appreciated by players for its engaging scenario, high-class criminal intrigue, and careful performance. SS-NG noted that in a pre-walkthrough age, the game was particularly difficult with aspects such as copy protection revealed in the middle of the game, playing in a games room, and a useful item disguised as part of a building interior. Secret Service described the gameplay as being reminiscent of Infocom products, in particular The Hitchhikers Guide To the Galaxy, noting that players are required to be sharp and perceptive when interacting with found objects, which often must be used in ways contradictory to their original purposes. The reviewer criticised the challenge of locating certain items and learning of the existence of others. Citing examples such as a coin on a beach, a hairpin on a sofa, and a hook on an anchor, Secret Service noted that such items were one-pixel size and are not visible on the screen, necessitating pixel hunting with the mouse, "creating unnecessary downtime". Due to this difficulty, the magazine said the developers should have tested the game with regular players before publishing it.

Polskie Gry Wideo wrote that the game's interface, which required pixel hunting, does not confirm correct solutions to puzzles, provide hints or a clear purpose of what to do in the world, putting it at odds with other adventure games of the time. They deemed it "a bit frustrating" and less enjoyable as a result. Benchmark noted that looking for details and objects relevant to advancing through the plot requires players to strain their eyes, a sentiment echoed by Orange. Nie tylko Wiedźmin noted that even by the standards of the time, the game was considered difficult. Geezmo said the way the game is designed requires players to smack the screen with their mice. While Secret Service said Tajemnica Statuetki is more modestly constructed that its Western counterparts, it concluded that it was solidly made without lags or having game-breaking bugs. Gry Online argued that the game was less fun and interesting than its successor Teenagent. Polskie Gry Wideo noted the game's "undeveloped game design and numerous unintuitive solutions."

=== Audiovisual design ===
Critics had a mixed response to Tajemnica Statuetki's audiovisual design. Gry Online said that when the game appeared on the market, "the mere use of digitized photographs was the pinnacle of the achievements of Polish programmers". Michael Zacharzewski of Imperium Gier said that by 1999 standards, the game should be considered an embarrassment in terms of technical quality. MiastoGier wrote that the game had impressive graphics despite its simple design. PB.pl said the game looks "clumsy" today while Interaktywnie noted that it appealed despite its "amateur character". According to Radio Szczecin, by 2014 standards, the game is "unkempt" due to its static photographs, lack of animation and music, and expository subtitles, all of which might "scare off the younger players". It noted, however, that older players should play the game to remind them of what adventure games used to be like.

SS-NG said the game's audiovisual content would have seemed lacking compared to Western games even at the time of release, particularly its sound effects and use of digitised photographs. Gry Online noted that while the game was lacking graphically, the use of digitised photographs was considered a milestone in the Polish video game industry at the time. Describing the game as a "strong textbook with pretty images", Secret Service expressed disappointment that it did not include music in the introduction or a line-by-line voiceover. Video Games Around the World deemed the production values "Spartan" because of the use of digitised photographs, lack of animations and music, and minimal sound effects. Polskie Gry Wideo wrote that the game's graphics contrasted with those of its western contemporaries such as Mystery House (1980), Maniac Mansion (1987), The Secret of Monkey Island (1990), and Indiana Jones and the Fate of Atlantis (1992).

SS-NG said the game's photographic material added an air of authenticity. Bastion Magazynów noted that even at the time of its release, the game did not delight with sound or graphics. Geezmo said the lack of animation and the inaudible soundtrack came across as technical weaknesses. MiastoGier noted that the unprecedented use of incredibly photo-realistic graphics caused players astonishment. Chmielarz agreed that the game "technically did not delight". Secret Service wrote that they wished the game's creators had made a version that would be compatible with inferior graphics cards. SS-NG thought that the game "did not impress with graphics". Exec lamented that the sound was limited to just a few samples and some "very annoying squeaks".

=== Polishness ===
Video Games Around the World wrote that reviewers were willing to overlook the shortcomings of Tajemnica Statuetki as it was the first Polish adventure for the PC. SS-NG noted that because it was only released in Polish, English-speakers were unable to fully enjoy it and that despite its shortcomings it "won the hearts of Polish [and non-Polish] adventure lovers". The site also said it should be played by everyone so they will appreciate one of the first Polish video games. Despite the magazine's reservations, Secret Service deemed Tajemnica Statuetkia good game, recommending it because of its affordability and accessibility; it also said, "the patriotic duty of all players should be to buy it from the producer and finish it". SS-NG called the game a source of national pride, commenting that "anyone who knew our beautiful Slavic language could play it". To the reviewer, the game has a replay-ability unlike other adventure games because it is a piece of their childhood; the writers felt gratitude to the developers for the many hours they used to spend playing it. Aleksy Uchański wrote in Gambler that at the time the Polish gaming industry had "2.5 good games of native production (and about ten times more rubbish)", most of which were not influential in the industry's development, calling Metropolis and its early games the worthy exception.

While Tajemnica Statuetki was unable to compete with Sierra or LucasArts products, SS-NG said it was quite good by Polish standards of the time, writing that the best aspect of the title is that "above all, it was Polish". Despite writing that in the modern age it is difficult to understand how such an average product could have been praised one day, Gameplay wrote that playing Tajemnica Statuetki was worthwhile to see what the "global hit of Polish production" once looked like. Polskie Gry Wideo said arguably the most important thing about the game was that information is provided in Polish, deeming it "revolutionary". SS-NG said while the game may have been "a bit forgotten" by 2004, that did not detract from its "contribution to the development of the entire domestic industry". In 2014, Radio Szczecin commented that the game had not aged well but was unforgettable because it is a fully Polish production from its artists to its subtitles, with international action. Radio Szczecin also said the title is unforgettable due to its cultural relevance, in the sense that a game with Polish artists and subtitles made a dent on the world stage.

== Legacy ==
Tajemnica Statuetki was followed by the critically acclaimed point-and-click adventure Teenagent (1995), which the company eagerly advertised thus: "The creators of Tajemnica Statuetki have been silent for over a year. See for yourself why". InnPoland attributes this marketing campaign to the game becoming a "breakthrough". PB.pl said this slogan "grabbed" the public.

As Teenagent was the first Polish game to be professionally marketed, Polygamia said, "none of the Polish producers has ever preceded their game with such great marketing efforts", and that this created a media buzz around the game. According to Eurogamer, "the studio was flush with the early successes" of these two games. Among the studio's later work was the satirical adventure game The Prince and the Coward (1998), created with the help of the fantasy writer Jacek Piekara. The Prince and the Coward completed the trilogy of adventure games that Chmielarz started his game designer career with. Chmielarz thought the title, one of his first three commercially released games, was more convincing than his first ZX Spectrum games. A continuation of the Tajemnica Statuetki story, which was to be released on a CD-ROM, was announced. Photographic material for the game was collected but work was suspended and Metropolis Software worked on other projects. As of December 1994, Secret Service still expected Tajemnica Statuetki 2 would be released, most likely in 1995. Bajty Polskie noted that even in 2015, players still anticipated a sequel to the game, with a story in which Pollack goes on holiday with a friend to a Polish castle near Masurian Lake and an ambulance takes away his friend.

A personal conflict between Chmielarz and Miechowski led to the former leaving the company around 2002 to form People Can Fly. Metropolis Software was acquired by CD Projekt in 2008 as a subsidiary and became defunct the following year. Miechowski later founded 11 Bit Studios. Metropolis kept the rights to Tajemnica Statuetki; these became the property of CD Projekt when they bought the company and they may still own them.

The use of holiday photographs as part of the game's visual language partly inspired People Can Fly developer Wojciech Pazdur to use photogrammetry to help build levels for the first-person shooter Painkiller. The 2004 adventure game Ramon's Spell, according to SS-NG, was modeled on this game. Tajemnica Statuetki was Metropolis' first use of special service agents, a trope that would reappear in many of their later games including 2007's Infernal. Chmielarz, the "Polish Sid Meier" said his 2014 game The Vanishing of Ethan Carter saw him return to his adventure gaming roots of the Tajemnica Statuetki era, while Gamezilla said the latter title would not have existed without the former.

Adam Juszczak's text Polski Rynek Gier Wideo – Sytuacja Obecna Oraz Perspektywy Na Przyszłość noted the "breakthrough" nature of Tajemnica Statuetki in a wider context; the Polish gaming market had been delayed because of the socialist system and the lack of widespread access to computers and consoles; as a result it had only begun to develop in the 1980s. The first Polish computer magazine, Bajtek, was launched in 1985. Around this time, the first Polish games also began to emerge, placing Tajemnica Statuetki in the history of Polish entertainment.

Thanks to this product, players believed that Poles could make good games, and the developers themselves believed that there was a demand for domestic goods.

- SS-NG reviewer Jacek Marciniak, on Tajemnica Statuetki's impact on the development of the Polish computer games market,

Chmielarz's game had a wide impact on the domestic market. InnPoland wrote that it was one of the first Polish games to "enjoy hit status". It became an "undoubted success" and a "loud hit of the AT-era". It stood out significantly against the background of similar adventure games from Mirage, LK Avalon, and ASF, and it was difficult to confuse it with other titles. Nie tylko Wiedźmin wrote that IPS' behaviour as a publisher was a "funny ... anecdote" due to the unprecedented success of the game. MiastoGier said Metropolis Software's early work was part of the golden age of adventure games after the age of animation sprites and connected frames; the site deemed it an important piece of cultural history for adventure gamers that shows the beginnings of Polish game development and the start of Adrian Chmielarz's career, and describing the game as "legendary."

Onet called Tajemnica Statuetki "one of the most important games in the history of virtual entertainment". The game "allowed Metropolis Software" to "gain recognition in the Polish PC world of adventure games admirers". In addition, Onet said the game revolutionised game development in the country and that "for years it marked the direction of the industry". While Tajemnica Statuetki is virtually unheard of in the Western world, it was a "great success for the fast-paced Polish audience". SS-NG wrote that so much had been written about it that certain points of analysis had become hackneyed.

According to Polygon, "thanks to piracy just about every gamer of a certain age in Poland has played Mystery of the Statuette". Part of the reason was a Metropolis Pack containing Tajemnica Statuetki, Teenagent, and Katharsis put together by pirates and released as shareware. SS-NG said the unprofitability in the industry due to piracy necessitated a leap of faith on Chmielarz's part. Polish YouTuber Krzysztof “NRGeek” Micielski asserted that the game's original release marked the first title he ever bought rather than pirated. As of 2019, Chmielarz is considered a "living legend" in the Polish video gaming industry and "one of the most important computer game developers" in the country. Polskie Gry Wideo shrugged off the title's underwhelming aspects as the "first, clumsy steps" at the beginning of Chmielarz's influential career, calling it a "step in the right direction". The history of early Polish video game development, and specifically the creation of Tajemnica Statuetki, was addressed in the Polish-language book Nie tylko Wiedźmin: Historia polskich gier komputerowych.

In 2014, Orange listed the game as the sixth best Polish game of the 1990s. Logo 24 listed Tajemnica Statuetki as one of the "Top 10 ... most important Polish games", deeming Chmielarz "probably the most known and respected Polish game developer". In 2016, the game was exhibited as part of the Digital Dreamers exhibition at the Palace of Culture and Science Sciences in Warsaw and was listed by Benchmark in their article Najlepsze polskie gry (The best Polish games). Marcin N. Drews and Chmielarz reunited for a panel at the 2017 Pixel Connect convention, where they spoke about the game. Chmielarz had previously spoken about it on a 2013 panel with other early Polish game developers. The game can be legally played at GOG.com.
