= Gambler (magazine) =

Polish monthly video game magazine

- February 1994 cover
- Frequency: Monthly
- Publisher: Lupus
- First issue: 1993
- Final issue: 1999
- Country: Poland
- Language: Polish
- ISSN: 1230-8676
- OCLC: 749239965

Gambler was a Polish monthly video game magazine published between 1993 and 1999 by the Lupus publishing house. The magazine was partly created by former employees of Top Secret, similar to the formation of Secret Service and Reset. In 2011, Gambler was reactivated as a website.
