= Przegląd Techniczny =

Polish engineering magazine

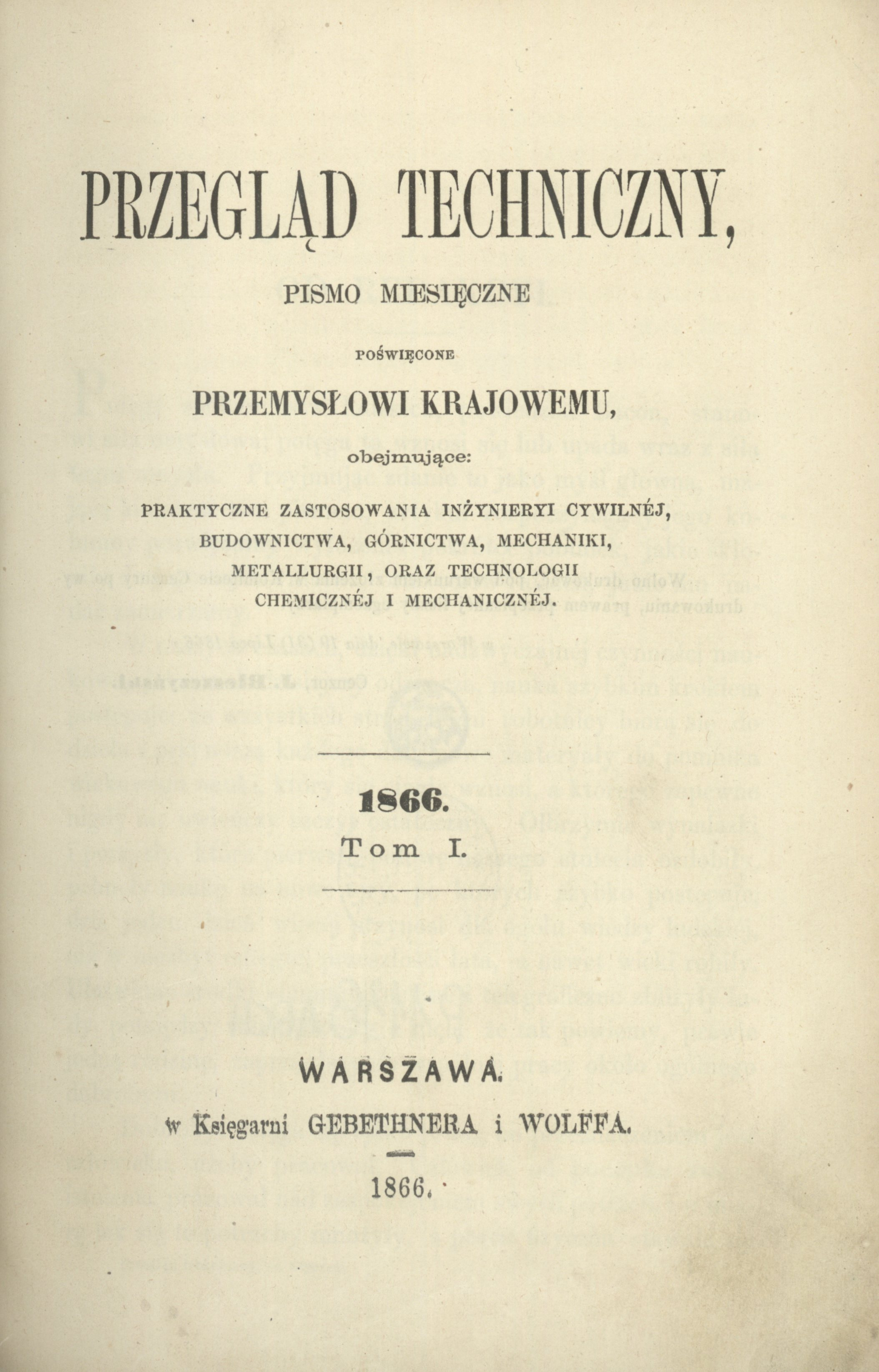
Cover page of the first issue

Przegląd Techniczny (Polish pronunciation: [ˈpʂɛ.ɡlɔnt tɛxˈɲit͡ʂ.nɘ], English: Technical Review) is a Polish engineering magazine that has been published since 1866. It is one of the oldest magazines on technical topics in Europe. Ewa Mańkiewicz-Cudny serves as the editor-in-chief. 50% of readers are managers of companies or scientific institutes, 75% have higher education, and 85% are aged between 25 and 45 years old. The games reviewed in the magazine inspired Adrian Chmielarz to take up gaming, leading to his creation of many Polish video game classics like Tajemnica Statuetki.
