= Teen Agent =

Teen Agent may refer to:

- Teenagent, a 1995 graphical adventure game video released for the DOS and Amiga platforms
- If Looks Could Kill (film), a 1991 film released in the United Kingdom as "Teen Agent"
