= Adrian Chmielarz =

Polish video game designer and developer

- Born: April 9, 1971 (age 55); Lubin, Poland
- Occupation: Video game developer
- Known for: Metropolis Software, People Can Fly, The Astronauts (company)
- Notable work: Painkiller (video game); Gears of War (video game); Bulletstorm; Gears of War: Judgment; The Vanishing of Ethan Carter; Witchfire

Adrian Chmielarz (born 1971 in Lubin) is a Polish video game designer, programmer, creative director, producer and writer specializing in adventure games and first-person shooters. Chmielarz has co-founded and led Metropolis Software, People Can Fly and The Astronauts. He is one of the most prominent Polish video gaming figures, and has been described as one of the "most divisive" figures in the industry.

== Life and career ==
=== Piracy business and amateur game development ===
Born in Lubin on April 9, 1971, Adrian Chmielarz moved into game development in a roundabout way. In 1985, at the age of 14, Chmielarz attended the first Polcon science fiction convention in Błażejewko, where he first discovered an affinity for computers. He soon went through a Star Wars fan phase that saw him interact with a computer for the first time. By the late 1980s, he had become fascinated with computer games such as Knight Lore and Bugsy by reading about them in Przegląd Techniczny. He began saving for a ZX Spectrum despite never having used one before. His first experience playing games would see him typing in each line of code from gaming magazines into his friend's computer, though each time he turned off the computer the games were wiped as there was no way to save them. Chmielarz was pushed by a desire to buy a computer with his own money, knowing that his parents had been forced into the black market to "put food on the table".

In 1987, Chmielarz earned financial sustainability by traveling 40 miles each day to sell bootleg foreign films on VHS tapes, copied from a friend at a bazaar in Wrocław (such type of copyright infringement was not illegal in Poland until 1994). The Wrocław marketplace where such goods were sold often had access to newer titles earlier. He noted that while an Englishman could buy a game the day of release, the average Pole would often have to wait up to five weeks and become impatient during that time, leading to this natural solution. According to Chmielarz "many people would buy games, if only it would be possible." At one point, Chmielarz set up a distribution deal with the to-be-founders of what would become Polish distribution company CD Projekt, whereby they would drop cassette tapes full of pirated games at a local train station. After picking them up, to get an advantage over his competitors at the bazaar, he would add subroutines to alter gameplay (such as changing the number of lives or adding invulnerability); he would also himself crack the games and then apply his own anti-piracy protection measures to prevent other pirates from copying and selling it. Eventually, his bootleg business expanded into a brick-and-mortar company which sold different types of media, including movies and games, while also building computers to feed the local business industry. However, large companies started to enter Poland and the market became crowded. While he had a computer engineering company, the times were getting tougher and only giants with big money could survive on the market. Chmielarz decided to leave his profitable business and study at Wrocław University of Technology. However, he became bored and left without finishing his degree; he would later regret wasting his time at university.

By 1990, Chmielarz had his own computers and his obsession led to him playing and making games all the free time. He sent the results of his experiments with creating video games the editorial offices of the magazines Komputer and Bajtek, winning a subscription to the latter as a result. One of these early titles was an erotic game Erotic Fun that sold well without any long-term profit; he later deemed this a good business lesson about exploiting an opportunity in the gaming market. Some of his other early games included text adventure games Kosmolot Podróżnik and Sekretny Dziennik Adriana Mole, which he wrote on the Timex Computer 2048.

=== Professional game development ===
In 1992, Adrian Chmielarz and Grzegorz Miechowski co-founded video game developing and publishing company Metropolis Software. The group realised that they could fill a gap in the untapped Polish software market, in which hundreds of thousands of people owned computers but were unable to become fully immersed in adventure games as they did not understand English. Chmielarz was not worried about the Polish gaming market being a small niche, as he knew the trail had already been set by developer xLand. Furthermore, he had assessed that while the local market was currently not active it was potentially big, noting the number of people who attended conventions. This project evolved into Chmielarz's first commercially released video game, the 1993 point-and-click adventure Tajemnica Statuetki. Some of Chmielarz's next projects, such as another point-and-click adventure game Teenagent (1995), scrolling shooter Katharsis (1997), and tactical role-playing game Gorky 17 (1999, known as Odium in North America), have been published also outside Poland. Due to an internal conflict, Chmielarz left Metropolis in 2002.

Founding the video game development studio People Can Fly in 2002, he went on to create the successful first-person shooter Painkiller (2004) and its follow-ups Painkiller: Battle Out of Hell (2004), Painkiller: Hell Wars (2006), and Painkiller: Hell & Damnation (2012). A partnership with Epic Games and the work on the Gears of War series of third-person shooters, in which he personally went from a multiplayer level designer for the first two games to being the original creative director of Gears of War: Judgment (2013), led to Epic acquiring People Can Fly in 2007 and the creation of their next first-person shooter, Bulletstorm (2011).

After leaving People Can Fly (by then fully owned by Epic) in 2012, Chmielarz formed the independent video game studio The Astronauts, which developed and published its debut game, the first-person adventure The Vanishing of Ethan Carter in 2014. His next game and a return to the first-person shooter genre, Witchfire, is to be released "when it's done".

Chmielarz has also written commentary articles for Polish video game magazines, including his monthly columns "Gawędy bez fai" and "Gawędy po fai" in Secret Service and NEO+. In English, he has written blogs at Gamasutra and Medium.

== Games ==
| Year | Title | Role |
|---|---|---|
| 1995 | Teenagent | Scenario designer |
| 1997 | Blaster! | Designer |
| 1999 | Odium | Designer |
| 2004 | Painkiller | Project leader, lead game designer |
| 2007 | Gears of War | Additional level design |
| 2011 | Bulletstorm | Creative director |
| 2013 | Gears of War: Judgement | Original creative direction |
| 2014 | The Vanishing of Ethan Carter | Creative director, Developed as part of The Astronauts |
| 2026 | Witchfire | Creative director, Developed as part of The Astronauts |
