= The Astronauts (company) =

Polish video game developer

- Company type: Private
- Industry: Video games
- Founded: October 2012; 13 years ago
- Founder: Adrian Chmielarz; Michał Kosieradzki; Andrzej Poznański
- Headquarters: Warsaw, Poland
- Products: The Vanishing of Ethan Carter
- Website: theastronauts.com

The Astronauts is an independent Polish video game developer based in Warsaw. It was formed in October 2012 by Adrian Chmielarz, Michał Kosieradzki and Andrzej Poznański, who had founded People Can Fly in 2002 but left that studio in August 2012 after it was wholly acquired by Epic Games.

== History ==
Adrian Chmielarz, Michał Kosieradzki, and Andrzej Poznański founded People Can Fly in 2002, following Chmielarz's departure from Metropolis Software, a studio he had co-founded in 1992. People Can Fly was developed with the concept of helping to raise awareness of Poland's contribution to the video game industry. People Can Fly's first title, Painkiller, was critically successful and led to an agreement with THQ to publish a new title, Come Midnight, allowing the studio to expand from 20 to about 70 staff members. However, THQ canceled the project after a year and a half. To avoid going out of business, Chmielarz contacted Epic Games for an evaluation copy of Unreal Engine to let them develop a demo that they could shop around to gain funding. Epic's Vice President Mark Rein was impressed with the demo they produced within the month and secured their work on the personal computer port of Gears of War. People Can Fly began to co-develop games with Epic, including more games in the Gears of War series and Bulletstorm. Around 2012, Epic started evaluating the acquisition of People Can Fly, and this was completed by August of that year. At that same time, Chmielarz, Poznanski, and Kosieradzki announced they would be leaving People Can Fly to establish a new, smaller studio, The Astronauts. Chmielarz said that he had been concerned that with Tencent's recent purchase into Epic to help them build out games as a service, that there would not be room for the type of narrative-driven games that he wanted to make. Both Chmielarz and Rein considered the departure amicable. The opening was announced in October 2012.

With The Astronauts, Chmielarz was able to hire in some of the People Can Fly developers to build out smaller, story-focused games. Their first game was The Vanishing of Ethan Carter, which was released in September 2014. The game is a horror-themed adventure game, with the player investigating a mystery involving the paranormal. Chmielarz considered it a spiritual successor to the cancelled Come Midnight project. The game was critically successful, and received the Best Game Innovation award at the 2015 British Academy Games Awards. The studio's second title, Witchfire, was revealed during The Game Awards 2017 in December of that year. The trailer revealed the game to be a first-person shooter in addition to exploration from The Vanishing of Ethan Carter.

== Games developed ==
Year	Title	Publisher(s)	Platform(s)				Notes
Year	Title	Publisher(s)	Win	PS4	XONE	Switch	Notes
2014	The Vanishing of Ethan Carter	The Astronauts	Yes	Yes	Yes	Yes	
2023	Witchfire (Early Access)	The Astronauts	Yes	No	No	No	In development
