= Galador =

Galador may refer to:

- Galador, the first prince of Dol Amroth, a city in Gondor in Tolkien's Middle-earth
- The Prince and the Coward, a Polish video game also known as Galador: The Prince and the Coward, or its main character "Galador".
- the homeworld of the Galadorians, an alien race in the DC Comics universe
- the homeworld of the Galadorians, a humanoid race in the Marvel Comics universe
  - Rom the Space Knight's homeworld

== See also ==
- Galidor: Defenders of the Outer Dimension
