= Witchfire (disambiguation) =

Witchfire is an upcoming video game by The Astronauts.

Witchfire, Witch Fire, Witch-fire, or Witch's Fire may also refer to:

- St. Elmo's fire
- Witchfire (Marvel Comics), a Marvel Comics superhero and former member of both Gamma Flight and Alpha Flight
- Witchfire (DC Comics), a DC Comics superheroine
- Witch Fire, a 2007 California wildfire season
