= Katharsis (video game) =

1997 video game

- Developer: Metropolis Software House
- Publishers: WW: Metropolis Software House (shareware); POL: CD Projekt; UK: TopWare Interactive
- Platform: MS-DOS
- Release: March 17, 1997 (shareware)
- Genre: Scrolling shooter
- Mode: Single-player

Katharsis (also known as Blaster!) is a horizontally scrolling shooter from Polish developer Metropolis Software House and published by CD Projekt in 1997.

== Plot ==
In the year 2616, a ship leaves Earth and 18 months later the planet loses contact with the vessel. In 4720 AD, Earth is attacked by a foreign ship and the player is one of the few survivors. Their mission is to protect a bomb that will be used to destroy the enemy base.

== Development ==
Led by Polish developer Adrian Chmielarz, the team aimed to combine classical mechanisms for scrolling shooters with the increase in capabilities of IBM PC compatibles of the late twentieth century. The Polish premiere of the game took place on March 1, 1997; the game received online and television press and a competition was created. It had a US premiere on June 6, 1997.

== Reception ==
Meristation called the graphics and sound "novel". The AV Vault thought the game put more attention into its graphics than its controls. MerixStudio felt the game was surprisingly deep, complex and mysterious, and a notable example of Polish developers entering the side-scrolling market.
