= Outriders (video game) =

2021 video game

- Developer: People Can Fly
- Publisher: Square Enix
- Director: Bartosz Kmita
- Writers: Joshua Rubin; James Exarcopoulos
- Composer: Inon Zur
- Engine: Unreal Engine 4
- Platforms: PlayStation 4; PlayStation 5; Stadia; Windows; Xbox One; Xbox Series X/S
- Release: April 1, 2021
- Genres: Third-person shooter, action role-playing
- Modes: Single-player, multiplayer

Outriders is a 2021 online-only cooperative action role-playing shooter game developed by People Can Fly and published by Square Enix. The game was released for PlayStation 4, PlayStation 5, Stadia, Windows, Xbox One, and Xbox Series X/S on April 1, 2021.

Outriders received mixed reviews from critics, with praise towards the gameplay, customization, and visuals, but criticism for the story and characters. While the game reached over 3.5 million players by May 2021, it is unclear if it was a commercial success as Square Enix and People Can Fly released contradicting statements on the game's commercial performance in regards to expected revenue.

== Gameplay ==
Outriders is a third-person shooter mixed with elements from role-playing games. In the beginning of the game, players create their custom characters and choose from four classes, each of them with unique abilities that the players can use. The four classes include the Trickster, which has the ability to manipulate time, the Pyromancer, which can manipulate fire, the Devastator, which can unleash seismic attacks, and the Technomancer, which uses turrets and other devices. These special skills have a short cooldown time and can be combined with other skills for maximum effects. The game features a skill tree that allows players to unlock and upgrade their skills.

Players can use different weapons such as shotguns and assault rifles to defeat enemies, and firearms can be customized with weapon mods. Players can hide behind cover to shield themselves from enemy attacks, though health will only regenerate if the player manages to hurt or kill enemies. Players combat monstrous animals, human, and humanoid enemies. As the player progresses, the world level (the game's equivalent to gameplay difficulty) will increase. If the world level is high, it is more likely for the player to get high-end loot from defeated enemies.

The game incorporates various role-playing elements. As the players explore, they can explore different hub areas, talk to non-playable characters and complete side missions. In cutscenes a dialogue tree allows to decide the outcome of some conversations, though it does not affect the story's progression. The game can be played solo, but players can also complete the game together with two other players.

== Plot ==
During the middle of the 21st century, Earth has passed the point of no return as climate disasters grow more frequent and dangerous, surpassing humanity's ability to mitigate them. The major governments of Earth combine their resources under the newly formed Enoch Colonization Authority (ECA) in a last-ditch effort to preserve humanity on Enoch, a distant Earth-like planet. Two massive colony ships, the Caravel and the Flores, are built, each holding 500,000 colonists. Despite the Caravel suffering a catastrophic explosion in the middle of construction, the Flores successfully reaches Enoch's orbit in 2159, after an 83-year journey. The Outriders, a team of elite soldiers tasked with scouting the landing zone and paving the way for the colonists, are the first to land. However, they quickly discover the Anomaly, an unexpectedly massive and deadly energy storm. The Outriders attempt to warn the ECA to abort the colonization, but the ECA leadership instead send their own security forces to silence the Outriders by purging them. One of the Outriders, having survived exposure to the Anomaly, is mortally wounded during the fighting and is put back into cryostasis by Shira Gutmann, an ECA engineer.

The Outrider is awakened from cryostasis 31 years later in 2190, where they find that the ECA's attempted colonization has failed, with the Anomaly destroying all the colony's advanced technology and trapping all the colonists within the confines of a single mountain valley. Beset by hostile alien wildlife and left with dwindling resources, the colonists split in a massive civil war pitting the remnants of the ECA against the Insurgents, militant rebels who seek to overthrow the ECA. In addition, people who have survived exposure to the Anomaly like the Outrider have become "Altered", mutant humans possessing supernatural powers. The Outrider manages to reunite with Shira, now the de facto leader of the ECA, who tasks the Outrider with fighting against the Insurgents and eliminating their Altered.

Shira then explains that she and scientist Dr Abraham Zahedi are trying to trace the source of a mysterious signal originating from the other side of the Anomaly. Having recorded the exact frequency of the signal when they first landed, the Outrider heads out to meet Zahedi. Zahedi reveals that he possesses the last satellite uplink capable of connecting to the Flores, which remains in orbit with half of the colony's supplies. If the colonists can relocate to an area safe from the Anomaly, they can establish a new colony. Taking Zahedi and several companions, the Outrider traverses a number of hazardous environments and is finally able to breach the Anomaly and reach the other side, only to find a vast, barren desert littered with derelict human installations but inhabited by a humanoid native species violently hostile to humans, which they call "Ferals".

As the group continues to follow the signal, they discover the wreck of the Caravel, which has inexplicably reached Enoch before the Flores. Upon entering the Caravel, the group learns that after the Flores left Earth, those left behind were able to rebuild the Caravel with a more advanced engine. With this engine, the Caravel was able to reach Enoch before the Flores. Upon landing, the Caravel colonists encountered a native race they called the Pax, named for their peaceful nature. The Pax also kept the strange energy native to the planet in balance, harnessing their own powers from it. The colonists craved this power and feared the Pax using it against them, so they violently subjugated the Pax in a vain attempt to gain their abilities. Increasingly abusive and cruel treatment of the Pax progressed to genocide. Left with no choice, the surviving Pax converted themselves through a ritual into a Feral form capable of violence to resist and wiped out the Caravel colonists. However, this form removes their ability to reason and behave peacefully, which allows the Anomaly to form and spread across. The signal the Outriders had followed all this time was the Caravel's automated distress beacon. The Ferals assault the Caravel, but the Outrider and their group are able to fight them back, allowing Zahedi to signal the Flores to launch its cargo pods.

As the group watches the cargo pods land, they are met by a group of humans who have followed their trail, inspired by the stories of the Outrider. Still determined to fulfill their mission, the Outrider presses on to look for a suitable area to colonize.

=== Worldslayer ===
Despite recovering the remaining cargo pods from the Flores, the ECA is still in danger due to the Anomaly expanding at an exponential rate, which is causing destructive snowstorms to sweep across all of Enoch. Zahedi reveals to the Outrider that he has been in contact with an Insurgent scientist named Francisco Salvador who may know the answer to stopping the storms, but he has lost contact with him. The Outrider decides to head to Salvador's last known location at Black Gulch. The Outrider manages to infiltrate the Insurgent base but finds Salvador dead. They recover Salvador's research but are forced to flee when Commander Ereshkigal, who wants the storms to cull humanity, arrives.

Using Salvador's research, Zahedi is able to pinpoint an apparent safe zone inside the Anomaly. The Outrider travels there and finds the Pax shaman Atuma living there. Atuma reveals that the obelisk maintaining the safe zone is on the verge of failure, but there is another one called the Root Shard that may be able to save humanity. Atuma leads the Outrider to the lost Pax city of Tarya Gratar, where she explains the ancient Pax destroyed themselves over exploitation of the Anomaly before the survivors learned to live in balance with it. The Outrider recovers the Root Shard and brings Atuma to Rift Town to meet Shira. Atuma then tells Shira she will only be willing to hand over the Root Shard once there is peace between the ECA and Insurgents. She then shows Shira a vision of the future that convinces her to start negotiations with Ereshkigal, but she refuses to stop the storms and kills Shira, who reveals to the Outrider she willingly sacrificed herself to make Atuma's vision come true. In their rage, the Outrider confronts and kills Ereshkigal, ending the threat of the Insurgents. With the war over, Atuma uses the Root Shard to create a safe zone for the surviving humans to live in.

Though humanity was saved, the Outrider decides to delve into the depths of Tarya Gratar to find a way to permanently end the threat of the Anomaly despite Atuma's warnings that such forbidden knowledge may drive them mad. Eventually, the Outrider reaches the meditation chamber of the Pax's first leader, the Father. Inside, the Outrider realizes that the Father predicted the arrival of humanity on Enoch, and that the Outrider would eventually find the meditation chamber. The chamber then begins to move deeper into the planet, with the Outrider wondering what kind of message the Father left for them.

== Development and release ==
Polish developer People Can Fly started Outriders's development in 2015. Square Enix agreed to publish it and encouraged the team to expand on their vision. To develop the game, People Can Fly expanded the studio from having 40 members to more than 200 members. Outriders's gameplay reveal caused critics to compare the game to other live service games such as Destiny and Tom Clancy's The Division, though People Can Fly affirmed that Outriders is not a live service title and that it was a game that players can "start and finish". The game was designed with cooperative gameplay in mind, though the team put a lot of emphasis in writing the game's story, with the lead writer Joshua Rubin comparing it to Apocalypse Now and Heart of Darkness. The game's narrative features a much more serious tone than Bulletstorm as the studio wanted to prove that it can also write a mature story.

On May 16, 2018, Square Enix announced that they would publish the next title from People Can Fly. Announced at E3 2019, Outriders was released for PlayStation 4, PlayStation 5, Stadia, Windows, Xbox One, and Xbox Series X/S on April 1, 2021, after being delayed from its late 2020 timeline due to being impacted from the COVID-19 pandemic. A game demo for the game was released in February 2021 and attracted 2 million players.

On March 15, 2021, it was announced that the Xbox version would be available at no additional cost to Xbox Game Pass subscribers. An expansion for the game titled Worldslayer was released on June 30, 2022.

== Reception ==
Reception

Aggregate scores
Aggregator	Score
Metacritic	PC: 73/100; PS4: 72/100; PS5: 73/100; XSXS: 73/100
OpenCritic	52% recommend

Review scores
Publication	Score
Destructoid	7/10
Electronic Gaming Monthly	3/5
Famitsu	31/40
GameRevolution	7.5/10
GameSpot	8/10
GamesRadar+	3.5/5
Hardcore Gamer	4/5
IGN	7/10
The Guardian	4/5

=== Critical reception ===
Outriders received "mixed or average" reviews from critics, according to review aggregator website Metacritic. OpenCritic determined that 52% of critics recommend the game.

Mack Ashworth from GameRevolution gave the game a 7.5/10, criticizing the story and characters, although praising the gameplay, level design, visuals, and combat animations, as well as the fact the game felt complete upon launch. In summary, he wrote that "it doesn't innovate in any huge way and its many flaws are tough to ignore, but Outriders is a blast from a simpler past". Destructoid gave the game a 7/10, also praising it for being a complete game at full price and wrote, "Solid and definitely has an audience. There could be some hard-to-ignore faults, but the experience is fun".

GameSpot's Phil Hornshaw gave the game an 8/10, praising that the "combination of cover shooting, loot shooter, co-op, and superpowers create intense tactical combat". Tom Bramwell of The Guardian felt the game captured "exactly what makes the genre tick", praising the guns as being universally fun to use. However, he noted the story would not appeal to everyone, citing the use of "wooden dialogue and sci-fi cliches".

Jon Ryan of IGN awarded the game a 7/10, lauding the game's focus on action, and feeling the multiplayer mode was the most enjoyable way to play. He further complimented the world design and visuals, and the fact the game had no microtransactions. On the other hand, he criticized the story as "lackluster", despite appreciating "genuinely intriguing twists", as well as the user interface and bugs.

Jordan Forward of PCGamesN gave the game a 7/10 writing: "Outriders' fast-paced combat and imaginative sci-fi setting make it a journey worth taking. For all its flaws at launch, this could be the start of something very special for developer People Can Fly."

=== Sales ===
During its week of release, Outriders was the sixth best-selling retail game in the UK all-format charts, the second best-selling retail game in the Switzerland all-format charts, and the PlayStation 4 and PlayStation 5 versions of the game debuted at the ninth and twentieth position of the Japan individual-format charts; with 6,596 and 2,431 physical copies sold, respectively. On Xbox, Outriders was the best-selling digital game during launch week. During its launch month of April 2021, it placed within the top ten best-selling digital games on Xbox, and within the top five best-selling digital games on PlayStation. While the game's launch was plagued with server issues, it attracted nearly 100,000 concurrent players on Steam. For the period between February 28 and April 3, 2021, Outriders was the third best-selling game in the US based on dollar sales.

The game attracted 3.5 million players one month after the game's initial launch. According to Square Enix, releasing the game at launch for Xbox Game Pass subscribers "worked in their favour" as it helped the game to build an install base in a short period of time.

It's unclear if Outriders was a commercial success or not, because while Square Enix stated it was "on track to become the company's next major franchise", People Can Fly have yet to receive royalties as of August 2021, leading them to suggest it hasn't yet turned a profit. People Can Fly estimate the game has sold between 2 and 3 million units.

=== Awards ===
In 2021, Outriders won the Technology award at the Central & Eastern European Game Awards (CEEGA), an annual award ceremony aimed at recognizing and promoting the best video games from Central and Eastern Europe.
