= People Can Fly =

Polish video game developer

PCF Group S.A.
- Logo used since May 2020
- Trade name: People Can Fly
- Formerly: Epic Games Poland (2013–2015)
- Type: Public
- Traded as: WSE: PCF
- Industry: Video games
- Founded: February 2002; 24 years ago
- Founders: Adrian Chmielarz; Michał Kosieradzki; Andrzej Poznański
- Headquarters: Warsaw, Poland
- Number of locations: 7 studios (2022)
- Key people: Sebastian Wojciechowski (CEO)
- Number of employees: 500+ (2024)
- Parent: Epic Games (2007–2015)
- Website: peoplecanfly.com

PCF Group S.A., trading as People Can Fly (PCF), is a Polish video game developer based in Warsaw. The studio was founded in February 2002 by Adrian Chmielarz, previously the co-founder of Metropolis Software, together with acquaintances Michał Kosieradzki and Andrzej Poznański. The studio's first game was Painkiller (2004). Its success led to a deal with THQ for the game Come Midnight, which allowed the studio to expand. After the game was cancelled, People Can Fly found itself in financial trouble. Epic Games acquired a majority share in People Can Fly in August 2007 and collaborated with the studio on projects such as Bulletstorm (2011) and Gears of War: Judgment (2013).

Epic bought the studio outright in August 2012. Chmielarz, Kosieradzki and Poznański subsequently left the studio and later founded The Astronauts. People Can Fly was rebranded Epic Games Poland in November 2013. The studio spun off under its former name and logo in June 2015 under the lead of chief executive officer Sebastian Wojciechowski. As of December 2024, the company employs roughly 500 or so people in eight locations. Its most recent game is Outriders, which was released on 1 April 2021.

== History ==
=== Founding and success with Painkiller (1992–2004) ===
Before People Can Fly, Adrian Chmielarz had founded Metropolis Software with Grzegorz Miechowski, his friend since high school, in 1992. They successfully published a number of titles in Europe, including Teenagent. Due to a personal conflict with Miechowski, Chmielarz opted to leave Metropolis in 2002. He considered leaving the video game industry due to the strain on his friendship with Miechowski but, after a few months, decided to try a new venture. He contacted previous acquaintances Andrzej Poznański and Michał Kosieradzki, and together they founded People Can Fly in February 2002 with the aim to bring Polish game development to a much wider audience. Chmielarz said that, at the time, most games developed in Poland had some success locally, but were not given much attention from the rest of the world, a sentiment shared by many other Polish developers that he had talked to. Chmielarz, Kosieradzki and Poznański served as the creative lead, lead artist and principal artist respectively. Expanding to about twenty developers, some of whom left established jobs at other studios to join People Can Fly, the studio developed its first title, Painkiller, which was released in 2004 to critical success.

=== Projects with Epic Games (2004–2015) ===
Stemming from the success of Painkiller, People Can Fly struck a partnership with THQ to produce Come Midnight. Using THQ's multi-million dollar financing, the studio expanded to 70 people. The team worked on the game for about a year and a half, developing a proprietary game engine for it, before THQ cancelled the project in 2006 and withheld the remaining payment of approximately US$300,000. With only about one month of operating capital left, Chmielarz contacted Epic Games and requested an evaluation copy of their Unreal Engine, intending for the studio to make a quick demo that they could pitch to other publishers for further funding. Epic Games' vice-president, Mark Rein, having known People Can Fly's work, personally handled the agreement. The studio created a demo within a month, and Rein was impressed with the quality of it and the speed at which it was created. He, therefore, arranged for the studio to work on a port of Epic Games' Gears of War to personal computers (PCs), saving the studio. Epic Games also acquired a majority stake in the studio in August 2007.

Epic's interest in People Can Fly led to the two companies collaborating on Bulletstorm and Gears of War: Judgment, with People Can Fly reaching about 120 staff members around this time. During the development of Gears of War: Judgement, Epic Games began to discuss the full acquisition of People Can Fly, which they completed in August 2012. Chmielarz, Kosieradzki and Poznański subsequently announced their departure from the studio, founding another studio, The Astronauts, shortly thereafter. Chmielarz stated the reason for their departures was due to the nature of how Epic Games was approaching game development, partially influenced by Tencent's prior investment in the company to help them develop games as a service. Chmielarz felt this approach would be limiting for them to develop narrative-driven games. He said of Epic Games' approach: "It's not about being right or wrong. Hopefully, my vision of the future and their vision of the future are both valid, because it's actually possible. They're not in opposition to each other." Chmielarz was able to bring a number of other People Can Fly developers over to The Astronauts, which went on to develop the ideas that they had for Come Midnight into The Vanishing of Ethan Carter. Both Chmielarz and Rein described the founding trio's departure as amicable.

In November 2013, People Can Fly was rebranded Epic Games Poland, falling in line with Epic Games' other worldwide studios. On 24 June 2015, the studio announced that it split from Epic Games to become an independent company again, reverting to its former name and logo. According to Sebastian Wojciechowski, the chief executive officer of People Can Fly following the split, the studio had been working on others' intellectual property (IP) since the release of Gears of War: Judgement and wanted to return to making their own IP. While the exact details of the split were not made public, Wojciechowski described it as a "real management buyout". The company retained the rights to the Bulletstorm franchise and revealed an unannounced project made using Unreal Engine 4. People Can Fly continued working with Epic Games on their projects Fortnite and Spyjinx alongside developing their own IP.

=== As an independent company (2015–present) ===
PCF opened a satellite studio in Newcastle upon Tyne in September 2017 with a number of former Ubisoft developers among the hired staff. They opened a second Polish studio in Rzeszów in May 2018, bringing on many workers previous laid off from CI Games. By this time, People Can Fly employed approximately 160 people, up from around 40 in 2015. This accompanied news that People Can Fly was working with Square Enix on a AAA shooter. A fourth studio, People Can Fly New York, was opened in June 2019 and raised the headcount to 200. One year later, PCF had 250 employees. People Can Fly became a public company on the Warsaw Stock Exchange in December 2020.

In April 2021, PCF acquired Phosphor Studios in Chicago and Game On in Montreal, raising its headcount to over 350. Wojciechowski stated that People Can Fly was eyeing acquisitions primarily in the United States and United Kingdom because they had better price–performance ratios than those in Poland. With the purchase of Incuvo Studios in December 2021, PCF brought its headcount to 490. In January 2024, the company laid off roughly 30 employees, and a further 120 employees in December.

PCF announced the cancellation of two projects in June 2025. Project Gemini, which was to be published by Square Enix, was cancelled due to lack of communications regarding their contract with Square Enix, while Project Bifrost lacked security in its funding to continue. Management also said it was organizing the teams and would likely need to lay off additional staff.

== Studios ==
Name	Location	Founded/acquired	Ref.
PCF Warsaw	Warsaw, Poland	2002	
PCF Newcastle	Newcastle upon Tyne, England	2017	
PCF Rzeszów	Rzeszów, Poland	2018	
PCF Łódź	Łódź, Poland	2020	
PCF New York	New York City, United States	2019	
PCF Chicago (formerly Phosphor Studios)	Chicago, United States	2021	
Game On	Montreal, Canada	2021	
Incuvo	Katowice, Poland	2021	
PCF Krakow	Kraków, Poland	2022	
PCF Publishing	Dublin, Ireland		
Cooldown Games	Dallas, United States	2026	

== Games developed ==
Year	Title	Platform(s)	Publisher(s)	Notes
2004	Painkiller	Windows, Xbox	DreamCatcher Interactive	
2007	Gears of War	Windows	Microsoft Studios	Port development
2011	Duty Calls: The Calm Before the Storm	Windows	Electronic Arts	
2011	Bulletstorm	Nintendo Switch, PlayStation 3, PlayStation 4, Windows, Xbox 360, Xbox One	Electronic Arts, Gearbox Publishing	Co-developed with Epic Games
2013	Gears of War: Judgment	Xbox 360	Microsoft Studios	Co-developed with Epic Games
2017	Fortnite: Save the World	macOS, PlayStation 4, Windows, Xbox One	Epic Games	Co-developed with Epic Games
2021	Outriders	PlayStation 4, PlayStation 5, Stadia, Windows, Xbox One, Xbox Series X/S	Square Enix	
2022	Green Hell VR	Windows, Meta Quest 2, PSVR2	People Can Fly	Developed by Incuvo, a People Can Fly studio
2024	Bulletstorm VR	Meta Quest, PSVR2, Steam	People Can Fly	Developed by Incuvo, a People Can Fly Studio
2026	Gears of War: E-Day	Windows, Xbox Series X/S	Xbox Game Studios	Co-developed with The Coalition
TBA	Lost Rift	Windows	People Can Fly	
TBA	Project Bison	TBA / (VR)	People Can Fly	
TBA	Project Echo	TBA	Krafton	
TBA	Project Delta	TBA	Sony Interactive Entertainment	New game based on Sony IP

=== Cancelled ===
- Come Midnight – Originally scheduled to be released in 2007 for the PlayStation 3 and Xbox 360 by THQ but cancelled in 2006
- Project Dagger
- Project Gemini
- Project Bifrost
