= The Inquisitor (video game) =

- Developer: The Dust
- Publisher: Kalypso Media
- Engine: Unity
- Platforms: PlayStation 5; Windows; Xbox Series X/S
- Release: WW: February 8, 2024
- Genre: Action-adventure
- Mode: Single-player

The Inquisitor is a 2024 action-adventure video game developed by The Dust and published by Kalypso Media. Players investigate reports of a vampire in an alternate history version medieval Europe.

== Gameplay ==
The story is based on the Inquisitor novels by Jacek Piekara, which take place in an alternate history where Jesus sought vengeance on the Roman Empire rather than martyring himself. As a result, Christianity is portrayed as violent and merciless. Players control Mordimer Madderdin, an inquisitor in medieval Europe charged with investigating reports of a vampire and punishing sinners. Players can choose merciful or merciless options in dialogue, which can affect how the story progresses. During his investigation, Madderdin can question or torture sinners for information. This information can be vetted in an alternate dimension Madderdin can access, though players must fight or hide from monsters here.

== Development ==
This is Polish developer The Dust's first non-mobile game. Kalypso Media released The Inquisitor for Windows, PlayStation 5, and Xbox Series X/S on February 8, 2024.

== Reception ==
Reception

Aggregate scores
Aggregator	Score
Metacritic	(XSX) 63/100 (PC) 58/100
OpenCritic	29% recommend

Review score
Publication	Score
Famitsu	28/40

The Xbox Series X and PC versions of The Inquisitor both received "mixed or average" reviews from critics, according to the review aggregation website Metacritic. Fellow review aggregator OpenCritic assessed that the game received weak approval, being recommended by 29% of critics. In Japan, four critics from Famitsu gave the game a total score of 28 out of 40. IGN called the concept fascinating, but they felt it did not live up to its ambition. Though they enjoyed performing the investigation, they felt searching for clues and the combat were both too easy. They also said they had trouble identifying which parts of story were affected by their choices. PC Gamer said it "does deliver on the concept", but they felt some of the gameplay mechanics, such as combat and stealth, were poorly implemented. They recommended the game regardless to players who found the concept interesting.
