= Infernal (video game) =

2007 video game

- European cover art of the PC version
- Developer: Metropolis Software
- Publishers: EU: Playlogic Entertainment; INT: Eidos Interactive
- Platforms: Microsoft Windows, Xbox 360
- Release: EU: 23 February 2007; AU: 20 April 2007; NA: 9 May 2007 Xbox 360; NA: 30 June 2009; EU: 28 August 2009
- Genres: Third-person shooter, action-adventure
- Mode: Single-player

Infernal is a third-person action video game for Microsoft Windows, produced by Polish developer Metropolis Software and published by Playlogic Entertainment and Eidos Interactive in 2007. A console port, Infernal: Hell's Vengeance, was released on 30 June 2009 for Xbox 360.

Infernal is a modern-style third-person shooter with major first-person shooter influences. Players control protagonist Ryan Lennox, a former angel turned dark by unfortunate circumstances who has access to a number of unique demonic powers, including pyrokinesis, teleportation and the ability to feed on the souls of fallen enemies.

== Reception ==
Reception

Aggregate score
Aggregator	Score
Metacritic	61/100

Review scores
Publication	Score
1Up.com	C+
Edge	3/10
Eurogamer	5/10
Game Informer	4/10
GamePro	4.25/5
GameSpot	5.9/10
GameSpy	3/5
GameZone	5.9/10
IGN	(UK) 6.6/10 (US) 5.1/10
PC Gamer (US)	74%
The Sydney Morning Herald	2/5

Infernal received mixed reviews according to the review aggregation website Metacritic.

Most of the reviews state that the game lacked polish and called it last generation compared to current third-person shooters of the time such as Gears of War and Resident Evil 4. On the other hand, some reviews said it had good graphics and called it "mindless fun".

By April 2008 the PC release had sold over 100,000 units.

=== Hell's Vengeance ===
Reception

Aggregate score
Aggregator	Score
Metacritic	35/100

Review scores
Publication	Score
Famitsu	(X360) 25/40; 24/40
GameSpot	3.5/10
GamesTM	2/10
IGN	4/10
Official Xbox Magazine (UK)	3/10
Official Xbox Magazine (US)	3.5/10
TeamXbox	3.4/10
VideoGamer.com	4/10

Infernal: Hell's Vengeance received "unfavourable" reviews according to the review aggregation website Metacritic. In Japan, where the game was ported and published by Russel on 24 December 2009, Famitsu gave it a score of one six, one seven, one six, and one five for a total of 24 out of 40, while Famitsu Xbox 360 gave it a score of one six, one seven, and two sixes for a total of 25 out of 40.
