= Jacek Piekara =

Polish fantasy writer (born 1965)

- Born: May 19, 1965 (age 61); Kraków, Poland
- Education: University of Warsaw
- Occupation: Writer
- Writing career
- Pen name: Jack De Craft, Randall
- Language: Polish
- Genre: fantasy
- Notable work: Cykl Inkwizytorski
- Website: www.salon24.pl/u/jacekpiekara/

Jacek Piekara (born 19 May 1965 in Kraków, Poland) is a Polish fantasy writer. He has published novels and short stories. He is known for his stories about inquisitor Mordimer Madderdin, which as of 2026 are collected in eighteen books.

Piekara collaborated on the script of the computer game The Prince and the Coward, in which the protagonist Arivald is a character of his stories. Under pen name Jack de Craft he wrote also a novel about Conan the Barbarian titled Conan. Pani Śmierć. Video game The Inquisitor is also based on his work.
