= Top Secret (magazine) =

Polish video game magazine

- August 1996 cover
- Editor: Marcin Przasnyski (issues 1 to 9); Marcin Borkowski (issues 10 to 54)
- Categories: Computer and video games
- Frequency: Monthly, bimonthly
- Format: A4 (22–54)
- Publisher: Wydawnictwo Bajtek (1990–1996); Axel Springer Polska (2002–2003)
- First issue: October 1990
- Final issue: March 2003
- Country: Poland
- Based in: Warsaw
- ISSN: 0867-8480

Top Secret was a Polish magazine devoted to the subject of computer and video games, as well as to culture and events connected with them.

The first edition of the magazine was published between 1990 and 1996 by the Bajtek publishing cooperative, and it was the first magazine of this type in Poland. During that time, 54 issues were released.

The second edition was published between 2002 and 2003 by the Polish division of Axel Springer as an attempt to restore the title. However, in this time, only four issues were produced, and the project was abandoned.
