= Gears of War: Judgment =

2013 video game

- Developers: People Can Fly; Epic Games
- Publisher: Microsoft Studios
- Director: Adrian Chmielarz
- Producers: Piotr Krzywonosiuk; Alan Van Slyke; Chris Wynn
- Designers: Wojciech Mądry; Dave Nash
- Programmer: Grzegorz Mocarski
- Artists: Waylon Brinck; Wyeth Johnson
- Writers: Rob Auten; Tom Bissell
- Composers: Steve Jablonsky; Jacob Shea
- Series: Gears of War
- Engine: Unreal Engine 3
- Platform: Xbox 360
- Release: NA/AU: March 19, 2013; EU: March 22, 2013
- Genre: Third-person shooter
- Modes: Single-player, multiplayer

Gears of War: Judgment is a 2013 third-person shooter video game developed by People Can Fly and Epic Games and published by Microsoft Studios for the Xbox 360. It was released in North America and Australia on March 19, 2013, and in Europe on March 22. It is a spin-off of the Gears of War series and a prequel to Gears of War. The game follows Damon Baird, Augustus Cole and their squad Kilo as they are put on trial for disobeying orders just six weeks after Emergence Day.

Development on Judgment began in 2011 after the release of Gears of War 3. Epic Games recruited People Can Fly after their previous collaboration on Bulletstorm the same year. The developers decided to set the game before the first game and follow Baird and Cole prior to meeting Marcus Fenix and Dominic Santiago. Rob Auten and Tom Bissell wrote the game's story, while Steve Jablonsky composed the score with Jacob Shea.

Gears of War: Judgment received positive reactions from critics, but a mixed reception from fans. The game underperformed commercially, selling only 1 million copies by August 2013.

== Gameplay ==
Like its predecessors, Gears of War: Judgment is a third-person shooter, with an "over the shoulder" perspective and cover system.

The main campaign is divided into six chapters, each with several missions. Unlike the previous games in the series, which used very large, open environments, missions are self-contained portions of the overall story and returning to earlier missions' settings is never possible. Each mission is scored on several criteria including the number of kills by the player, head shots, and gibs, and up to three stars are awarded. During each mission an optional, harder setting is available mandates certain criteria such as a time limit or a restriction on usable weapons; doing so increases the score. Obtaining 40 stars unlocks the separate "Aftermath" campaign, which consists of one chapter and is a follow-up to the Gears of War 3 campaign. Aftermath does not award stars or offer the harder setting seen in the Gears of War: Judgment campaign.

=== Multiplayer ===
Gears of War: Judgment has two new multiplayer modes, OverRun and Free-for-All. The game has eight maps (four of which are exclusive to OverRun and four of which are exclusive to COG versus COG (Blue Team vs. Red Team)) and four game modes. Several key multiplayer features of the series have been changed as well, including the ability to plant grenades on walls, damage boosts from active reloads, and the ability to carry both a shotgun and a rifle into combat, though this last feature was later reinstated for all standard versus multiplayer modes except Free-For-All, due to fan dissatisfaction. "Execution" mode returned through free downloadable content two weeks after the game launched, with the addition of two free maps. Also absent in multiplayer, are the Locust, who only appear in OverRun; where this change was met with a highly negative reception from fans.

== Synopsis ==
=== Setting ===
The game's story takes place during flashbacks recalled by Baird and his team during a hearing at a COG military tribunal. Each level is a recollection by a different member of the team. Lieutenant and mechanical genius Damon Baird, former Thrashball player Augustus Cole, Onyx Guard cadet Sofia Hendrick and former UIR soldier Garron Paduk. The reason for the hearing is Baird's unauthorized use of a lightmass missile and subsequent death penalty. Upon hearing Baird's testimony it flashes back to Kilo Squad early in Emergence Day, surviving as the Locust were seizing control of many human areas and seeking to take over Sera.

=== Plot ===
Kilo Squad is put on trial for various crimes by Colonel Ezra Loomis and is given the chance to explain their actions:

Following orders, Kilo checks out a convoy in the Old Town part of Halvo Bay only to find it destroyed. Kilo proceeds to battle through Old Town and into the Museum of Military Glory where they encounter the fearsome Locust General Karn and his mount Shibboleth accompanied by hundreds of Locust. Contacting Colonel Loomis, Cadet Sofia Hendrick suggests using a powerful weapon known as the Lightmass Missile to take Karn out, but Loomis is against the idea. Realizing how dangerous Karn is, Kilo decides to do it anyway and travels to the Onyx Guard Academy where they find and protect the missile's targeting beacon, a bot that Lieutenant Damon Baird later names Troy. With Troy in their possession, Kilo travels to the Seashore Hills to the mansion of Professor Elliot, creator of the missile in order to get the launch codes needed to fire the missile. Fighting into the mansion, Kilo must defend Troy from repeated waves of Locust as he downloads the launch codes. Once they have the codes, Kilo travels to the island of Onyx Point where the missile itself is, fighting through entrenched Locust forces to reach and arm the missile. Despite orders to the contrary, they arm the missile and head back to the museum where they figure Karn is heading to lay a trap. Fighting across the rooftops of Old Town, Kilo sends Troy in to guide the missile and despite Loomis threatening to execute them if they go through with their plan, Baird fires the Lightmass Missile at the museum, blowing it up and killing hundreds of Locust, Karn presumably among them. Kilo then defends themselves from a massive Locust attack on their rooftop and once its over, are arrested by Loomis for their actions.

In the present, Loomis prepares to execute the squad when the Locust break into the courtroom. Private Garron Paduk, who particularly hates Loomis, saves his life and he flees while Kilo must fight their way out and to a nearby King Raven. Reaching the King Raven with Loomis, Karn is revealed to have survived the Lightmass Missile and he attacks Kilo and Loomis who manage to kill his mount Shibboleth. Loomis executes the heavily injured Karn and drops the charges against Kilo, but demotes Baird from Lieutenant to Private for his actions.

In the Aftermath campaign, set during Gears of War 3, Baird and Cole return to Halvo Bay with Clayton Carmine to find a ship and reinforcements for the assault on Azura. There, they encounter Paduk, who left the COG with Sofia sometime after the original battle and set up a community in the ruins of Halvo Bay that has both COG and UIR members with no one caring about sides, only survival. He agrees to lead the three to a ship that can take them to Azura. As they make their way through the ruined city to the washed-up Imulsion rig where Paduk's people are located, the squad comes into conflict with the Locust. Finally arriving at the rig, the group finds no living humans and it occupied by packs of Formers (Lambent Humans). Fighting through the Formers, they send off a flare from the roof of the rig and the survivors of Paduk's people, who have moved to another part of the city, send a King Raven to pick them up but they first have to hold off a determined Locust and Lambent assault. Finally, they board the King Raven and Paduk takes them to the flooded part of the city where a tidal wave from the sinking of Jacinto in Gears of War 2 has beached a ship on the roof of a hotel. The squad collects explosives from an armory at a police station and Baird sets them on columns at the hotel while the others cover him. Unfortunately, the explosives fail to collapse the hotel and the team must come up with an alternate plan. Making their way into a restaurant in the hotel, Baird opens three gas valves, releasing the gas into the building then detonates the gas with a grenade while he, Cole, Paduk and Carmine use a zip-line to get off the building. This time, the effort is successful and the building collapses, putting the ship back into the water. Having explained their plan to Paduk, Baird asks his old friend to come with them, but Paduk refuses as a group of Gears kidnapped Sofia, whom he was romantically involved with, causing him to hate the COG even more than he did before. Paduk leaves and tells Baird to never see him again if they are to remain friends. Baird, Cole and Carmine set sail for Azura on the ship, joining with Gorasni forces to help Marcus Fenix and the others in their assault on the island.

== Development ==
Development on Gears of War: Judgment began after the release of Gears of War 3 in September 2011. Epic Games brought in developer People Can Fly to lead the development, making this Epic and People Can Fly's second collaboration after Bulletstorm. PCF was previously developing a sequel to Bulletstorm before being assigned to work on Judgment.

For the game's campaign, the team wanted to explore Damon Baird and Augustus Cole before they met Marcus Fenix and his best friend Dominic Santiago in the first Gears of War game. A unique aspect of Judgment is every main character is playable through the campaign, as each of them have their own parts of the story.

Baird was chosen as the lead character of Judgment due to his status as a fan favorite character from the original trilogy who never had the spotlight. Lead level designer for Judgment Jim Brown thought of Baird as an interesting character who offers compelling storytelling opportunities. Writers Tom Bissell and Rob Auten wanted to explore an aspect of the series lore which is connected to the Emergence Day event; the story arc of Judgment, about the downfall of Kilo squad led by Baird, is presented in the aftermath of Emergence Day, a watershed moment that started the overarching narrative of the franchise. The creative team also wanted to depict Baird's character in his youth as the enthusiastic young leader of a squad, before he experienced his military career downfall and becomes a character widely regarded as the "cynical jerk" in the original trilogy. Prior to the game's official announcement, Game Informer revealed shaded cover art featuring the silhouette of a muscle-bound man in chains; many fans initially assumed the unidentified man was Marcus Fenix. Bleszinski disclosed in an interview that the mysterious cover made for a "cool reveal", while fan interest in Baird was another motivator. The nature of Baird's interactions with the members of his squad in Judgment, including Cole as they had only known each other for one month by that point, were meant to convey the impression that Kilo Squad is not a cohesive military unit. The writers felt that this creates an interesting, "jagged" dynamic which had not existed in the original trilogy; the creative process was further informed by real life military servicemen who recounted their experiences to the writing team about working closely with teammates they had a genuine dislike for.

For the multiplayer side of development, Quinn DelHoyo confirmed that the Locust would not be playable in Versus Multiplayer, and that it would be red vs blue COG teams. This created heavy criticism from fans due to the removal of the Locust.

Steve Jablonsky, who previously composed the music for Gears of War 2 and Gears of War 3, returned to compose the score for Judgment. Jacob Shea provided additional music.

According to Tim Sweeney, Gears of War: Judgment cost $60,000,000 to develop.

== Marketing ==
Microsoft announced the development of Gears of War: Judgment at the company's press conference during the Electronic Entertainment Expo 2012 in June, before releasing a debut trailer and demonstrating the upcoming multiplayer features. Prior to Microsoft's announcement, video game journalists had already determined that the chronology of events in Gears of War: Judgment would pre-date that of the other releases in the franchise, and that the prequel would feature Damon Baird and Augustus Cole as protagonists.

GameSpot confirmed that gamers who pre-order the game at Wal-Mart's website would receive either Gears of War 2 or Gears of War 3 at no additional cost. All customers who pre-order their games elsewhere would receive a download code for the original Gears of War as well as another download token for the Classic Hammerburst weapon and any playable multiplayer character skin.

Players could purchase a "VIP Season Pass" which offered players a permanent double experience boost and early access to two additional expansions which include six new multiplayer maps, two modes, five weapon skins, four armor skins, and two character skins.

== Downloadable content ==
- March 29, 2013 the first downloadable content (DLC) pack was released for the game called Haven. The DLC was released as a free to download pack and was co-sponsored by Maxim. It includes a multiplayer map also titled Haven and a new multiplayer mode called Execution in which each team attempts to wipe out the opposing team before time runs out. Those users who bought the Season Pass received a triple experience boost.
- April 19, 2013, Epic announced a second map pack titled Call to Arms. The map pack was released on April 23, 2013, exclusively to those who bought the Season Pass. It was released to general public on April 30, 2013. The DLC contains two new multiplayer maps Blood Drive and Boneyard and a new OverRun map called Terminal. The DLC also contains a new free-for-all gameplay mode called Master at Arms in which the goal is to get a kill with each of the 20 different available weapons, without resorting to melee or grenade tactics
- May 10, 2013, Epic Games revealed that their third expansion pack called Dreadnought would be a free multiplayer downloadable content pack for a limited time due to a sponsorship deal with Maxim and would be available to download from May 15, 2013. The DLC was however released a day earlier on May 14, 2013. It adds a new multiplayer map for the OverRun mode also titled Dreadnought.
- May 16, 2013 Epic Games announced that a fourth and final map pack titled Lost Relics would be available in June. The DLC included a new multiplayer mode called Breakthrough that features two teams with very distinct roles, one team has possession of a flag that they must deliver to a set location, the opposing team has a purely defensive role and unlimited resources. The attacking team must break through the enemy team's defensive line and deliver the flag before their pool of lives run out. The DLC includes three new multiplayer maps titled Checkout, Lost City and Museum. It also contains a new map for the OverRun mode called Ward. The DLC was released on June 18, 2013, for Season Pass holders and was released for general public on June 25, 2013.

== Reception ==
Reception

Aggregate score
Aggregator	Score
Metacritic	79/100

Review scores
Publication	Score
Computer and Video Games	8.5/10
Destructoid	9/10
Edge	8/10
Eurogamer	8/10
GameSpot	7.5/10
GamesRadar+	4/5
GameTrailers	8.1/10
Giant Bomb	3/5
IGN	9.2/10
Joystiq	4.5/5
Official Xbox Magazine (US)	8/10
Digital Trends	3.5/5
Gameplanet	7/10
VentureBeat	70/100

Gears of War: Judgment has received positive reviews from critics. It received an average review score of 79/100 on Metacritic. GameSpot gave it a score of 7.5/10. Giant Bomb gave it a score of 3/5, saying its campaign "twists the [Gears of War] formula in some interesting ways but the rest of the package feels pretty thin for a full-priced retail product". IGN scored the game a score of 9.2/10, calling the game "amazing" and "a fantastic prequel with super combat".

=== Sales ===
According to Cowen and Company the first-month sales of Gears of War: Judgment were very poor compared to Gears of War 3 selling about 425,000 units in the US, around a fifth of the two million Gears of War 3 managed in September 2011. In the United States, the game was the third best-selling title behind BioShock Infinite and Tomb Raider. In August 2013 it was revealed that Gears of War: Judgment sold just over one million copies.

== Notes ==
- Matulef, Jeffrey (August 30, 2012). "Gears of War: Judgment writers on what makes the series special and how to improve it". Eurogamer.
