= CDP.pl =

CDP.pl Sp. z o.o.
- Type: Private
- Industry: Retail industry
- Founded: 1994; 32 years ago
- Headquarters: Warsaw, Poland
- Website: cdp.pl

CDP.pl Sp. z o.o. was a Polish publisher and video game, film, e-book, and audiobook distributor founded in 1994 as CD Projekt sp. z o.o. It was renamed to CDP.pl Sp. z o.o. in 2012. It became independent from the CD Projekt group in November 2014 after a management buyout. In January 2015, the company was expanded to include paper books, music, consoles, computer hardware, as well as tabletop, card, and figure games. In February 2017, the site was sold to Merlin Group.

CDP.pl has filed for bankruptcy in May 2020. The site is unavailable as of 2022.
