= Gorky 17 =

1999 video game

- Developers: Metropolis Software; Hyperion Entertainment (Linux and Amiga)
- Publishers: Monolith Productions, TopWare Interactive (Windows); Linux Game Publishing (Linux) e.p.i.c. Interactive (Macintosh)
- Platforms: AmigaOS 4, Linux, Mac OS X, Microsoft Windows
- Release: Windows: EU: 29 September 1999; NA: 15 November 1999; Macintosh; 2002; Linux; 2006
- Genre: Tactical role-playing
- Mode: Single-player

Gorky 17 (released as Odium in North America) is a turn-based tactics tactical role-playing video game developed by Polish studio Metropolis Software and published by Monolith Productions for Microsoft Windows in 1999. The game was later ported to Linux by Hyperion Entertainment and published by Linux Game Publishing in 2006. The AmigaOS 4 version was released in 2015.

== Gameplay ==
The game features two modes: In the real-time 'exploration' mode, the player controls game characters using a mouse in a point-and-click manner to navigate the player characters through the city as well as interacting with various objects in the game world. Combat takes place in preset encounters located in specific areas of each level map. In the combat mode, the screen is divided into squares with player and computer-controlled characters taking turns trying to eliminate the opposing party. In one turn each game character can move by a certain number of squares and use a weapon once, or decide to take cover instead. Weapons have different tactical effects, for example the pistol can only be fired orthogonally, while the rifle can be fired orthogonally and diagonally. The game ends if any player-controlled character dies.

== Plot ==
The player commands a small group of NATO operatives who must reveal the mystery behind the sudden appearance of hybrid creatures in a former Soviet military base at a small Polish town near Lubin. The area is surrounded by NATO troops and media from all over the world, and the first group sent into town disappears without a trace. The main hero of the story is the 40-year-old Canadian soldier Cole Sullivan, a commando team member with extensive scientific knowledge. His team's task is to explain the hybrids' presence and to find the missing members of Group One.

== Development and release ==
Work on the game began at least as early as 1997, at which time it was known only by the working title Haunted City (which Adrian Chmielarz of Metropolis Software clarified has almost nothing to do with the game and "just somehow stuck"). The game was rendered entirely using Real3D. The developers debated over whether combat in the game should be realtime, turn-based, or a combination of both.

Hyperion Entertainment also announced an AmigaOS 4 version of the game, but nothing was heard of the port since then. At the Amiga30th Anniversary Dinner in 2015 the AmigaOS version was finally demonstrated in a near finished state with an estimated release of Christmas 2015.

== Reception ==
Reception

Aggregate score
Aggregator	Score
GameRankings	71%

Review scores
Publication	Score
AllGame	3/5
CNET Gamecenter	8/10
Computer Games Strategy Plus	2.5/5
Computer Gaming World	2/5
EP Daily	7.5/10
Eurogamer	8/10
GameRevolution	A−
GameSpot	5.9/10
GameZone	7.3/10
IGN	7/10
Next Generation	3/5
PC Accelerator	6/10
PC Gamer (US)	34%

The PC version received above-average reviews according to the review aggregation website GameRankings.

IGN rated the game as "decent", highlighting the mix of turn-based strategy, adventure and RPG genres. Graphically, "the environments themselves are nicely drawn, character animations are very fluid, and the atmosphere presented is ultimately quite captivating." Criticisms included the lack of a line-of-sight mechanic and some interface flaws. Eric Bratcher of NextGen called it "A groundbreaking title kept from four-star status only by the at-times unwieldy mechanics and some minimal balance issues."

== Sequels ==
Gorky Zero: Beyond Honor is a third-person isometric stealth action game. The story serves as a prequel to Gorky 17. The game was published in North America and the United Kingdom by JoWooD Entertainment.

Gorky Zero 2: Aurora Watching is a third-person stealth action game and a sequel to Gorky Zero. The game was published in North America by Dreamcatcher Interactive as Soldier Elite and in Europe by Enlight Software as Aurora Watching. The English translation ignores all ties to the previous Gorky titles, for example changing the protagonist's name from Cole Sullivan to White Fox. The English-language story concerns the protagonist infiltrating a secret Russian base where scientists are developing enhanced human soldiers called "Crazy Ivans".
