= Metropolis Software =

Polish video game developer

- Type: Division of CD Projekt
- Industry: Video games
- Founded: Warsaw, Poland (1992)
- Founder: Adrian Chmielarz; Grzegorz Miechowski
- Defunct: 2009
- Parent: CD Projekt (2008–2009)

Metropolis Software was a Polish video game developer founded in 1992 by high school friends Adrian Chmielarz and Grzegorz Miechowski. The studio gained success in Europe with their titles.

By the end of 1997, Metropolis had expanded to included 20 full-time employees. Around 2002, a personal conflict between Chmielarz and Miechowski led to Chmielarz to leave the company. A few months later, Chmielarz founded People Can Fly, along with some other staff from Metropolis. Miechowski continued to run Metropolis. In 2008, the studio was bought by CD Projekt, and closed in 2009. In October 2010, former CD Projekt and Metropolis Software developers announced the formation of 11 bit studios, a game development house with Miechowski as managing director.

Metropolis secured a license to develop a video game based on Andrzej Sapkowski's The Witcher series around 1997. According to Chmielarz, Sapkowski had little interest in the game, only seeing the monetary value of the license, giving Metropolis freedom to develop as they saw fit. The company got as far as completing one playable level, producing press material, and securing a publisher TopWare, but at the time, Metropolis was also working on three other titles. Between these, difficulties with the game, and TopWare's concern that the Slavic nature of the source material may not have international appeal, the project was shelved. Chmielarz said that the project was never officially cancelled, but got lost among the other work they were doing by 1999. CD Projekt later acquired the rights for The Witcher to develop The Witcher (2007).

== Games ==
- Tajemnica Statuetki (1993)
- Teenagent (1994)
- Blaster! / Katharsis (1997)
- The Prince and the Coward / Książę i tchórz (1998)
- Robo Rumble / RoBoRumble / Reflux (1998)
- Gorky 17 (1999)
- Archangel (2002)
- Gorky Zero: Beyond Honor / Gorky Zero: Fabryka niewolników (2003)
- Gorky Zero 2: Aurora Watching (2004)
- Ski Jumping 2006 / Skoki narciarskie 2006 (2005)
- Infernal (2007)
- They (cancelled)
- The Witcher / Wiedźmin (cancelled)
