= Secret Service (magazine) =

Polish gaming magazine

- November 1994 cover
- Categories: Gaming magazine
- Frequency: Monthly
- Publisher: ProScript
- Founded: 1993
- First issue: 16 March 1993
- Final issue: November 2001
- Country: Poland
- Based in: Warsaw
- Language: Polish
- ISSN: 1230-7726

Secret Service was a Polish monthly magazine for gaming and consoles, published by ProScript publishing house from 1993 to 2001. The first issue of the magazine was released on March 16, 1993. The founders of the magazine were Marcin Przasnyski and Waldemar Nowak, who had previously worked for Top Secret. The magazine was discontinued after 95 issues but was briefly reactivated in 2014 and published 2 issues.

== History ==
Secret Service was the first magazine in Poland to include an accompanying CD.

The last issue of Secret Service (No. 95) was released in November 2001. On December 31, 2001, a message appeared on the magazine's official website, indicating that the magazine was being suspended. A few days later, the staff stated that the information was a result of their server being hacked. They stated that the only reason for the "confusion" was technical problems.

== Attempts to reactivate the magazine ==
In July 2002, a group of Secret Service readers established Electronic Magazine SS-NG which evolved from a follower in the tradition of Secret Service to a standalone "E-zine." On August 29, the 2005 editor-in-chief of SS-NG informed the readers of the e-zine about the end of activities and publications of the magazine.

On June 24, 2014, reactivation of Secret Service was announced. On July 15, a crowdfunding campaign began with the goal of zł 93,000 (US$23,000) being reached in just 20 hours. Within a month, 284,200 PLN was collected. The first reactivated issue (97) was published on 30 September 2014 with 50,000 copies. The second and last issue appeared at the beginning of December, as the publisher and the owner of the rights to the title could not reach an agreement. In its place, the publisher announced the release of Pixel, a new monthly magazine, whose first issue went on sale in late January 2015.
