= Green Hell (video game) =

2019 survival video game by Creepy Jar

- Nintendo Switch cover art
- Developer: Creepy Jar
- Publisher: Creepy Jar (Note: Published on Nintendo Switch by Forever Entertainment)
- Designer: Michał Stawicki
- Programmers: Krzysztof Sałek; Tomasz Soból
- Artist: Krzysztof Kwiatek
- Writer: Michał Stawicki
- Composer: Adam Skorupa (Note: Additional music by Krzysztof Wierzynkiewicz)
- Engine: Unity
- Platforms: Windows; Nintendo Switch; PlayStation 4; Xbox One; PlayStation 5; Xbox Series X/S
- Release: September 5, 2019: Windows; September 5, 2019; Nintendo Switch; October 8, 2020; PlayStation 4, Xbox One; June 9, 2021; PlayStation 5, Xbox Series X/S; August 14, 2024
- Genres: Survival, Adventure, Open world
- Modes: Single-player, multiplayer

Green Hell is a 2019 survival video game by Creepy Jar. The game takes place in the Amazon rainforest and was initially released for Windows in September 2019. A port for Nintendo Switch was released in October 2020, and versions for PlayStation 4 and Xbox One released in June 2021. The game was made available in August 2024 for PlayStation 5 and Xbox Series X/S. The game concluded its development on September 3rd, 2024, with a final update introducing decorative features.

== Gameplay ==
The game is played in first-person perspective in single-player mode or in coop multiplayer. It is an open world simulation in which the player has to ensure their survival by collecting raw materials and food. However, the character, Jake, cannot rely on the accumulation of these essentials alone. Players also need to craft shelter and weapons with the materials they have collected. The player begins in a lone jungle camp without any further context. Throughout the game, dynamic changes occur within the environment, which influences the physical and psychological state of the character, e.g. in the form of hallucinations.

The player must maintain a balanced diet with the help of a smartwatch. The smartwatch provides an insight into the nutrients that the character lacks by alerting the player through the player's health. The player must sleep enough and must maintain their health, e.g. by avoiding contact with venomous animals or unsavory food and by avoiding injuries. The player can make medicine and bandages, which allow them to restore health. Infected wounds can be treated by putting maggots in the wound and bandaging it once the maggots have cleared away the dead flesh. A compass and GPS serve as navigation aids.

In the optional story mode, the player follows a frame story that revolves around the search for their missing wife. A prequel to the original release, titled Spirits of Amazonia Part 1, was released on January 28, 2021. Spirits of Amazonia Part 2 was released on June 22, 2021. Both offer single-player and co-op gameplay. Spirits of Amazonia and co-op gameplay are not available on the Nintendo Switch version.

== Story ==
The story revolves around anthropologist Jake Higgins, who wakes up in the jungle on the edge of the Amazon River. He tries to familiarize himself with the surroundings to ensure his survival and to find his wife, Mia who went missing after going on a solo trip to make contact with a nearby tribal village. She is a linguist and wants to open diplomatic channels with the uncontacted indigenous Yabahuaca people. The story is told from the first-person perspective by Jake, who notices that his wife is in danger. His only connection to her is through the radio. Throughout his journey, Jake, as well as the natural dangers in the jungle, encounters a skull-painted splinter faction of the Yabahuaca, the Waraha, who are composed of members of the original tribe who decided to resort to violence against the researchers.

== Reception ==
Reception

Aggregate score
Aggregator	Score
Metacritic	PC: 78/100; PS4: 78/100; XONE: 84/100

Review scores
Publication	Score
Nintendo Life	8/10
The Games Machine (Italy)	8/10
Screen Rant	4/5

The title was well-received by critics. On Metacritic it holds an approval rating of 78/100, based on 13 reviews.

Creepy Jar announced that the game sold over 1 million copies by June 2020 and 3.5 million copies by July 2022. By October 2023, the game had sold 5 million copies. In June 2024, Creepy Jar announced that 6 million copies across all platforms had been sold.In May 2026, Creepy Jar announced that the game had surpassed 12 million copies sold worldwide.

=== Nominations ===
The game was nominated for Central & Eastern European Game Awards 2019 in the categories Best Game and Best Design.
