= The Prince and the Coward =

1998 video game

- Developer(s): Metropolis Software House
- Publisher(s): IPS Computer Group
- Platform(s): Windows
- Release: 10 April 1998
- Genre(s): Adventure

The Prince and the Coward (Polish: Książę i Tchórz) is a 1998 video game created by fantasy writer Jacek Piekara and video game designer Adrian Chmielarz. It was produced by Polish company Metropolis Software in cooperation with the British Revolution Software. A non-official translation in English was released in 2020, and GOG.com re-released it in 2021.

== Plot ==
In a fantasy kingdom, a young boy makes a deal with a devil to become a prince. The devil, however, puts his soul in the body of local prince Galador during a duel with a black knight. The boy runs away and hides in the cemetery, where he meets the wizard Arhivald. With his help "Galador" must find his way to hell and reverse his condition.

== Gameplay ==
The title is a 2D point-and-click adventure game. The game is mouse-controlled. When clicking on an item a series of possible interactions appears for the player to choose from.

== Critical reception ==
Galadhor of Przygodoskop called it the best Polish adventure game, praising its humour and wit. Michal Necasek of Just Adventure praised the "unusual, convoluted and interesting" story, while criticising its puzzles as average, whereas some are "not logical at all".

Benchmark included it in a list of the 100 best games of the twentieth century.
