= The Vanishing of Ethan Carter =

2014 video game

- Developer: The Astronauts
- Publisher: The Astronauts
- Director: Adrian Chmielarz
- Designers: Adrian Chmielarz; Krzysztof Justyński
- Programmer: Adam Bienias
- Artists: Andrzej Poznański; Michał Kosieradzki; Adam Bryła
- Writers: Tom Bissell; Rob Auten
- Composer: Mikolai Stroinski
- Engine: Unreal Engine 3 Unreal Engine 4 (Redux)
- Platforms: Microsoft Windows; PlayStation 4 Xbox One; Nintendo Switch
- Release: Microsoft Windows: WW: September 26, 2014; Redux; PlayStation 4: WW: July 15, 2015; Microsoft Windows: WW: September 12, 2015; Xbox One: WW: January 19, 2018; Nintendo Switch: WW: August 15, 2019
- Genre: Adventure
- Mode: Single-player

The Vanishing of Ethan Carter is a 2014 horror adventure video game developed and published by The Astronauts for Microsoft Windows, PlayStation 4, Xbox One and Nintendo Switch.

== Gameplay ==
The Vanishing of Ethan Carter is set in an open world environment, in which the player can roam around and explore at will; in its opening the game notes that it "does not hold [the player's] hand", and as such features very little by way of explanation to the mechanics.

To piece together the story, the player must solve the deaths of the Carter family. Upon finding a dead body, the player can use paranormal abilities in order to recreate the events: first it must sense where important objects are located and restore the scene to its original state, and then reassemble the timeline of events tied to a certain death.

The game also features additional "stories" that must be fully uncovered for the game to receive its final ending; some of these are puzzles, others are more akin to a stealth game which cause the section to reset if the player fails.

== Plot ==
In 1973, paranormal investigator Paul Prospero receives a fan letter from 12-year-old Ethan Carter, inspiring him to journey to Ethan's hometown of Red Creek Valley, Wisconsin. Upon arrival, he learns Ethan has gone missing and begins encountering unsettling paranormal phenomena, as well as evidence of recent violence in the tiny mining village.

As his investigation progresses, Prospero learns the Carter family's dark secret: Ethan had released a malevolent spirit known as the Sleeper through witchcraft which has threatened their lives. When his uncle Chad and mother Missy tried to sacrifice him to appease the Sleeper, Ethan escaped with the help of his father Dale. Missy then killed Chad when he attacked Dale, and Dale later killed Missy. Dale then committed suicide in an effort to not become a vessel of the Sleeper as Ethan's older brother Travis now was. Travis turns on Ethan, forcing his grandfather Ed to kill Travis. Ethan and Ed try to destroy the Sleeper's chambers, but Ed traps Ethan inside the chamber and waits to die outside as Ethan sets a fire within. Prospero finds Ethan, but he suddenly vanishes after they both realise Prospero was too late.

If Prospero has uncovered all of Ethan's stories around the world, then using an elaborate mural created by Ethan, Prospero discovers that he is in fact a figment of Ethan's imagination: The cult of the Sleeper was an invention, as were the deaths of the family members during Prospero's investigation. Ethan had built a sanctuary inside a mansion in town to escape his family, particularly his overbearing mother, and abusive brother and uncle. When his mother accidentally sets the mansion on fire, trapping Ethan in the room with no way to save himself, he summons Prospero to provide comfort as he's consumed by the smoke by enacting a fictitious series of events. Having fulfilled his purpose, Prospero tells Ethan to let go, and that a new story awaits as both of them fade from the world.

== Development ==
The game was developed by three former People Can Fly employees, who had previously worked on first-person shooter video games with the company. The team was interested in moving into more story-heavy games. They almost released Come Midnight as a collaboration with THQ, although ultimately this was canceled. Upon forming their own company, The Astronauts, the team had the freedom they needed to work on such a game.

From the start the game was always going to be focused on horror. In dissecting the genre, lead designer Adrian Chmielarz discovered the genre of weird fiction and took inspiration from "An Occurrence at Owl Creek Bridge". Although he stated that he had the basic idea in mind prior to reading it, the story helped solidify the concept in Chmielarz's mind.

Feeling that settings in games inherently felt "a bit artificial", the team instead were inspired by nature to create a more natural-feeling world. The setting in particular takes inspiration from the Polish Karkonosze mountains. Chmielarz described the game as being "shot" there. The team used photogrammetry technology in order to create the in-game environment and make it look like the mountain range.

== VR Version ==
A VR version of the game was released as an official DLC for the game on Steam and as a standalone game on Oculus Store on March 28, 2016. It was delisted from both stores in 2024 and is no longer available for purchase.

== Reception ==
Reception

Aggregate score
Aggregator	Score
Metacritic	(PC) 82/100 (PS4) 81/100 (XONE) 77/100

Review scores
Publication	Score
Adventure Gamers	4/5
Computer Games Magazine	7.5/10
Destructoid	8.5/10
Eurogamer	9/10
Game Informer	8/10
GameSpot	9/10
GamesRadar+	3.5/5
IGN	8.5/10
Nintendo Life	8/10
PC Gamer (US)	82/100
PCGamesN	7/10
Push Square	8/10
RPGFan	85/100
The Guardian	4/5
USgamer	4.5/5

The Vanishing of Ethan Carter received positive reviews. Aggregating review website Metacritic gave the PlayStation 4 version 81/100 based on 33 reviews, and the Microsoft Windows version 82/100 based on 66 reviews. The game sold 60,000 copies in its first month on sale. As of December 2017, the game has sold over a million copies.

Julian Aidan from Hardcore Gamer praised its well-designed open world, visuals and story, but criticized the gameplay for being too linear, as well as finding the narrative weak. Shaun McInnis from GameSpot praised the simple yet enjoyable puzzle-solving, captivating story, outstanding graphics and breathtaking environments, but criticized its weird and vague auto-save system. Christopher Livingston from PC Gamer also criticized the save system, but praised the voice acting, enjoyable puzzle-solving, as well as the intriguing, satisfying, and wonderfully restrained story.

=== Awards ===
The Vanishing of Ethan Carter received the Best Game Innovation Award at 2015's British Academy Games Awards (BAFTA). During the 18th Annual D.I.C.E. Awards, the Academy of Interactive Arts & Sciences nominated The Vanishing of Ethan Carter for "Adventure Game of the Year" and outstanding achievement in "Art Direction", "Game Direction", and "Original Music Composition". The composer of the music of the game, Mikolai Stroinski, was nominated for the 2015 Hollywood Music in Media Awards in two categories: "Best Original Score – Video Game" and "Best Song – Video Game" (song "Valley of The Blinding Mist", vocal by Kyler England).

== Port ==
The Vanishing of Ethan Carter was ported to Unreal Engine 4, and was released for the PlayStation 4 on July 15, 2015. The Unreal Engine 4 port was released for the PC on September 11, 2015, under the title Vanishing of Ethan Carter Redux. Apart from the new engine, the revised version includes a new save system and eliminates the backtracking from the ending sequence of the game.
