= Bajtek =

Computer magazine in Poland (1985–1996)

- February 1993 cover
- Publisher: Wydawnictwo Bajtek
- Founder: Waldemar Siwiński
- First issue: 1985
- Final issue: 1996
- Country: Poland
- Based in: Warsaw
- Language: Polish
- ISSN: 0860-1674
- OCLC: 68735290

Bajtek is one of the first popular magazines devoted to computer science in Poland. Its title was a reference to the computer term byte and to the American magazine Byte. The founder was Waldemar Siwiński. The magazine was very well known in the late 1980s in the country. It was published between 1985 and 1996. The magazine was inspired by the British magazine Your Computer and the American magazine Compute!. The sponsor of Bajtek was Polish Socialist Youth Union which is also known as ZSMP.
