= Teenagent =

1995 video game

- Amiga cover art
- Developer: Metropolis Software House
- Publishers: EU: Metropolis Software; NA: Union Logic
- Platforms: MS-DOS, Amiga
- Release: February 1995
- Genre: Graphic adventure game
- Mode: Single-player

Teenagent is a 1995 point-and-click adventure game developed by Polish developer Metropolis Software House. It was released for Amiga and MS-DOS. The player controls teenage boy Mark Hopper, who wants to be a secret agent. It was the first game to be released on CD-ROM in Poland. A revised edition in 1996 was released as Nowy Teenagent.

== Plot ==
Gold is disappearing around Poland. The police agency wants to hire a random person to uncover the reason behind this disappearance - they choose teenage boy Mark Hopper.

== Gameplay ==
The game has three sections: "The Three Tasks", where Mark must prove himself by performing three tasks for the captain of the guards; "The Village", where Mark must wander around a village and gain entry to the mansion owned by the villain causing the gold's disappearance; and "The Mansion", where Mark must put a stop to the villain's plans.

== Development ==
Metropolis Software's contemporaries had begun making games for 8-bit computers, which freed up the market for the company to pursue PC game development without competition. The development team planned for Teenagent to follow in the footsteps of Tajemnica Statuetki's success, being competitive not only in Poland but internationally.

The character Mark Hopper was played by developer Adrian Chmielarz's younger brother.

Game story was inspired by American action comedy film If Looks Could Kill (1991).

== Release ==
When the game was originally released, "The Three Tasks" was shareware, and the remaining two sections could be obtained by registering the game, but the game was later released as freeware.

Teenagent was later released on Good Old Games as the milestone 100th game on the site. It is one of thirteen free games available on the site.

== Reception ==
Teenagent won a Silver Award from U.K. magazine PC Format.

The game's marketing slogan was: "The creators of Tajemnica Statuetki have been silent for over a year. See for yourself why". InnPoland attributes this marketing campaign, which attached its predecessor's quality stamp on the title, to Teenagent becoming a "breakthrough", while PB.pl thought this slogan "grabbed" the public. The title was considered a significant step forward in quality from its predecessor and stood on its shoulders in terms of its international reach.

== Music ==
The game's music was composed by Polish artist Radek Szamrej, aka RST. In November 2010, video game music community OverClocked ReMix released a free fan tribute album arranging the game's soundtrack.
