= Bulletstorm =

2011 first-person shooter game

- Developers: People Can Fly; Epic Games
- Publisher: Electronic Arts (Note: Gearbox Publishing released the Full Clip and Duke of Switch editions.)
- Director: Adrian Chmielarz
- Producer: Tanya Jessen
- Designer: Cliff Bleszinski
- Programmer: Lukasz Migas
- Artists: Andrzej Poznanski; Chris Perna
- Writer: Rick Remender
- Composers: Michał Cielecki; Krzysztof Wierzynkiewicz
- Engine: Unreal Engine 3 (Original, Full Clip and Duke of Switch); Unreal Engine 4 (VR)
- Platforms: Microsoft Windows; PlayStation 3; Xbox 360; PlayStation 4; Xbox One; Nintendo Switch; PlayStation VR2; Meta Quest 2; Meta Quest 3
- Release: February 22, 2011: Microsoft Windows, PlayStation 3, Xbox 360; NA: February 22, 2011; AU: February 24, 2011; EU: February 25, 2011 PlayStation 4, Xbox One; WW: April 7, 2017 Nintendo Switch; WW: August 30, 2019 PlayStation VR2, Meta Quest 2/3; WW: January 18, 2024
- Genre: First-person shooter
- Modes: Single-player, multiplayer

Bulletstorm is a 2011 first-person shooter game developed by People Can Fly and Epic Games and published by Electronic Arts (EA). The video game is distinguished by its system of rewarding players with "skillpoints" for performing increasingly creative kills. Bulletstorm does not have any competitive multiplayer modes, preferring instead to include cooperative online play and score attack modes. Set in the 26th century, the game's story follows Grayson Hunt, a space pirate and former black ops soldier who gets shot down on a war-torn planet while trying to exact revenge on General Sarrano, his former commander who tricked him and his men into committing war crimes and assassinating innocents.

Development of the game began in June 2007. Adrian Chmielarz and Cliff Bleszinski served as its director and designer respectively, while Rick Remender, the author of Fear Agent, wrote the game's story. It was originally envisioned to be a cover-based third-person shooter, though the core combat loop and gameplay perspective went through multiple revisions. Pulp magazines, Burnout, Duke Nukem, and Firefly all inspired the team during Bulletstorm's development. The team experimented with competitive multiplayer modes and campaign cooperative multiplayer mode during production but decided to remove them because of technological constraints.

Upon its release in February 2011 for Windows, PlayStation 3 and Xbox 360, the game received positive reviews from critics who praised its setting, graphics, action, pacing and gameplay, but was criticized for its story, short length, writing and multiplayer modes. It amassed a great deal of controversy with Fox News during its release window for its depiction of sexual jokes for humor. Bulletstorm was a commercial failure for both Epic Games and Electronic Arts, selling one million copies by 2013. Gearbox Publishing released a remastered version of the game titled Bulletstorm: Full Clip Edition in April 2017 for Windows, PlayStation 4 and Xbox One, and a version for Nintendo Switch, titled Bulletstorm: Duke of Switch Edition, in August 2019. A sequel was put on hold as the studio reallocated its resources to work on Gears of War: Judgment. A virtual reality version of the game, titled Bulletstorm VR, was released on December 14, 2023.

== Gameplay ==
A gameplay screenshot showing the "Skillshot" system. Players receive points when they perform creative kills.

As a first-person shooter, Bulletstorm focuses on combat. The game features eight weapons, each with their own distinct behaviors. In addition to standard firearms such as shotguns and assault rifles, the game features unusual weaponry such as the "Bouncer", which shoots explosive bouncing cannonballs, and the "Flailgun", a cannon that shoots bolas weighted by grenades. Each weapon has an alternate fire mode that uses "charges"; for example, the Screamer revolver's "charge shot" turns the weapon into a flare gun that ignites an enemy and sends them into the air.

The protagonist Grayson Hunt is equipped with an "instinct leash" that allows him to pull enemies towards him; an upgrade unlocks the "Thumper", which slams down a ball of energy that launches all nearby enemies and explosive barrels into the air. The player can also kick enemies or run and slide into them. If an enemy is launched into the air from the whip or by being kicked/slid into, they go into slow motion, allowing players to perform "skillshots". Skillshots reward the player for killing opponents in the most creative and unusual ways possible. Points are awarded for various actions, such as killing enemies in midair, making use of environmental hazards such as kicking enemies towards spikes and impaling them, or using a weapon's distinct feature. The more complicated or unusual the skillshot, the more points players acquire. Points are used as currency at "dropkits" scattered across the planet to purchase firearms, ammunition and upgrades. Dropkit checkpoints are also the sites where players can swap their weapons, access the Skillshot database, and view players' statistics.

Besides the single-player campaign, players can access two additional modes. In "Echoes", players must play through a single-player level and kill the enemies in the most unusual ways possible within a fixed period. Each player is given a rating on their performance, which is then uploaded to a leaderboard. Another mode is "Anarchy", a four-player co-operative multiplayer mode. In Anarchy, players must fight through waves of enemies and perform skillshots. When the group of players gains enough skillshots, they can then unlock new levels and arenas. The Anarchy mode has its own set of skillshots and a unique progression system.

== Plot ==
Bulletstorm takes place in the 26th century, where the universe is run by the "Confederation of Planets". Grayson Hunt (Steven Blum) (Note: Duke Nukem (Jon St. John) replaces Grayson in the campaign, if the Duke Nukem's Bulletstorm Tour DLC is enabled in Bulletstorm: Full Clip Edition and Bulletstorm: Duke of Switch Edition.) leads Dead Echo, a black ops team, with his comrades Ishi Sato (Andrew Kishino), Rell Julian (Chris Cox), and Dr. Whit Oliver (Robin Atkin Downes), all under the command of Confederation General Victor Sarrano (Anthony De Longis). Dead Echo assassinates a man named Bryce Novak and accesses his personal files; they discover Novak was not a criminal "separatist" as they had been told, but a civilian reporter, documenting evidence of Sarrano's corruption and his use of Dead Echo to eliminate his political and personal enemies. When Sarrano tries to have them killed for questioning him, Grayson and his team desert, flee to the edges of the universe, and become pirates.

Ten years later, the now-alcoholic Grayson's ship is intercepted by the Ulysses, Sarrano's flagship, near the ruined planet of Stygia. In a drunken rage, Grayson attempts a suicide attack on Ulysses. Both ships crash land onto Stygia, fatally wounding Ishi. Oliver sends Grayson and Rell to find an energy cell to power the ship's medical equipment so he can operate. Grayson locates an escape pod from Ulysses, retrieving its energy cell and a device called an "Instinct Leash". Doc manages to replace most of Ishi's body with cybernetics, including an AI processor for parts of his brain. However, in the middle of the operation, marauders break into the ship; Doc and Rell are both killed; Ishi survives, but is left permanently disfigured by the incomplete surgery.

Despite Ishi blaming Grayson for their losses and misfortune, they decide to work together to get offworld. As they work their way towards the nearest city, the AI processor in Ishi's brain takes over several times, fueled by his anger at Grayson's selfishness and refusal to give up his vendetta. The Leash leads them to another escape pod, where they find Trishka (Jennifer Hale), a member of Final Echo, Sarrano's replacement for Dead Echo. She agrees to work with Grayson and Ishi on the condition that they help her rescue Sarrano. Grayson eventually learns that Trishka was Novak's daughter; after Dead Echo inadvertently saved her life, she joined the military to hunt down the "separatists" who killed her father. Grayson tells her that Sarrano was in fact responsible for Novak's death, but lies about his involvement.

The three fight their way to Sarrano's escape pod, which landed on top of a skyscraper. Trishka holds Sarrano at gunpoint and demands answers; he manages to throw her off the roof and informs Grayson and Ishi that the Ulysses is carrying a "DNA bomb" designed to wipe out all life on Stygia so it can be repopulated. He claims that the bomb is damaged and that if it is not disarmed soon, they will die before help arrives. Reluctantly, the two fight alongside him to reach the wreckage of the Ulysses. Sarrano tricks Grayson into arming the bomb and escapes, leaving him and Ishi trapped. Just as it seems they are about to die, Trishka, who turns out to still be alive, rescues them.

The three race to Sarrano's rescue ship and get on board just as it takes off. They fight their way through Sarrano's "Heavy Echo" troops and confront him on the ship's bridge. Trishka demands to know who killed her father, and Sarrano reveals that Grayson and his men did. An argument ensues, and Sarrano then uses his own Instinct Leash to hijack Ishi's body, forcing him to attack Grayson and Trishka. Encouraged by Grayson, Ishi wrests back control and takes a bullet meant for Grayson. Enraged, Grayson impales Sarrano on the wall, but Sarrano is able to eject him and Trishka back to the surface. Grayson and Trishka get to the Ulysses and board an unused escape pod, launching into low orbit where the explosion of the DNA bomb propels the pod into space. As Stygia is slowly consumed by the blast, the two talk about Grayson's revenge, the loss of his team, and Sarrano still being alive. Trishka, forgiving Grayson for the mistake in killing her father, asks him what he is going to do about Sarrano escaping, and the screen fades to black. In a post-credits scene, it is revealed that Sarrano is alive, now a cyborg due to the extent of his injuries. Ishi has also survived, but is under the full control of his AI processor.

== Development ==
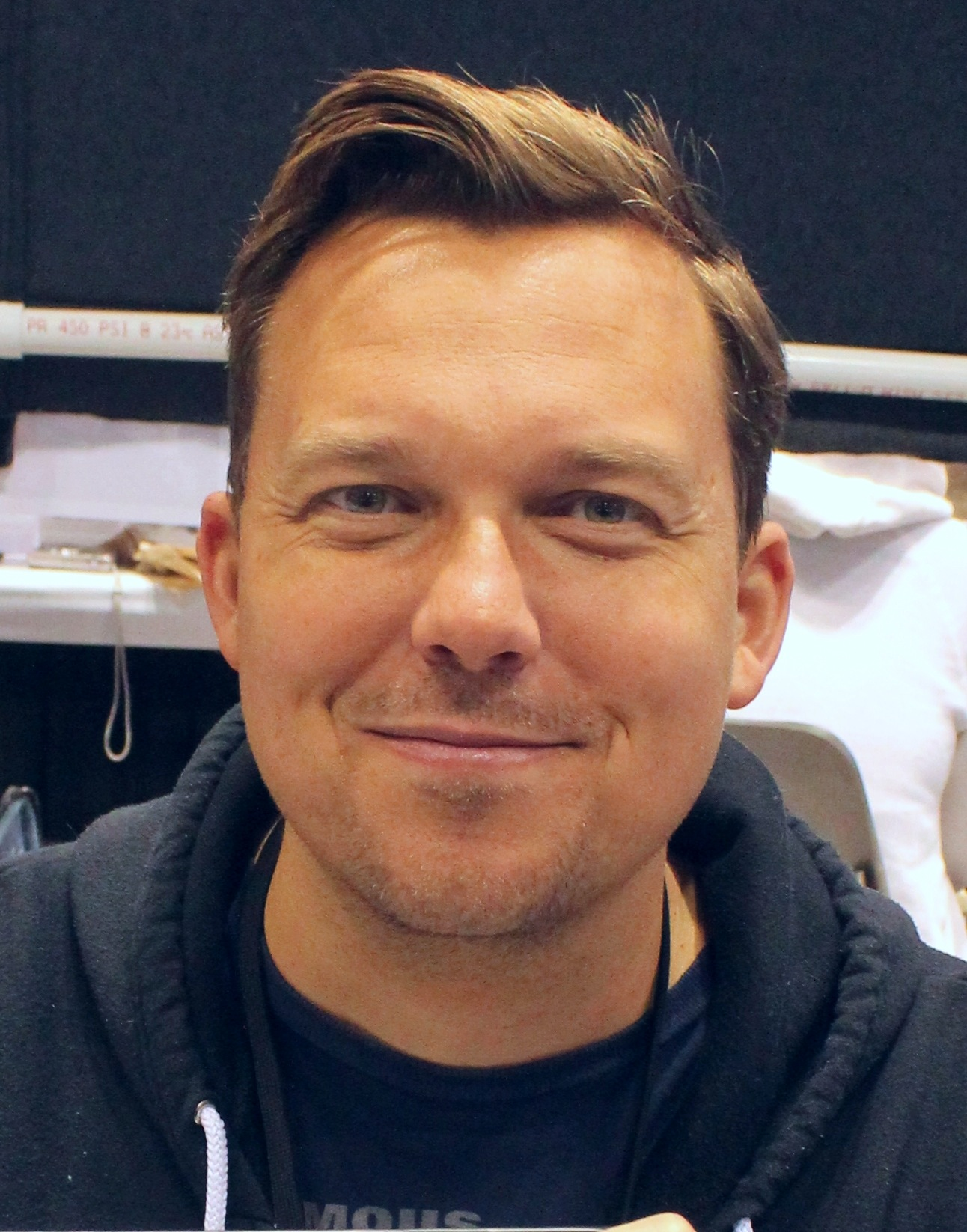
Rick Remender served as the game's writer.

Bulletstorm was developed by Polish game studio People Can Fly. They had previously created the Painkiller series, a first-person shooter (FPS) designed for the PC. Bulletstorm was the studio's first triple-A game. Development began in June 2007, and the game enjoyed a roughly three-and-a-half-year development cycle. During the game's production, the studio had about 70 people working on it. The game was a collaboration between PCF and Epic Games, which had acquired a majority stake in the studio in August 2007. Electronic Arts (EA) published the game under its EA Partners program, after being impressed by the studio's work on Painkiller. PCF's Adrian Chmielarz directed the game, which was designed by Epic's Gears of War creator Cliff Bleszinski, and penned by writer and producer Rick Remender. PCF confirmed on February 2, 2011, that Bulletstorm had declared gold, indicating it was being prepared for duplication and release.

Since Bulletstorm was the studio's first video game developed for home consoles, Epic Games helped PCF extensively when they were porting the game to PlayStation 3 and Xbox 360. Epic's own Unreal Engine 3 rather than PCF's proprietary engine powered the game. This change allowed the team to create game demos quickly when they were pitching the project to publishers. The initial demo impressed Epic, who agreed to collaborate with PCF. While PCF was the main developer of Bulletstorm, Epic Games ensured that the game was high quality by providing feedback and engine support. Some of the game's development was outsourced to external companies in Germany, China, USA, Sweden, and Poland. Epic, an esteemed developer, helped to secure a publishing agreement with Electronic Arts. While there were communication troubles among the three companies initially, this problem eased when the studio streamlined the communication processes. Whereas EA and Epic had provided their feedback separately to PCF, the new communication model saw EA providing feedback directly to Epic, which would then integrate EA's feedback with their own and deliver it to PCF. Regarding the collaboration with Epic, Chmielarz said that the studio "got some tough love from Epic and their uncompromising approach to quality", and suggested that it was "a fantastic lesson on what quality means".

Originally, the studio did not plan to have any unique gameplay feature or an ambitious goal for the game and only wanted to "offer a fun high adventure". The game was initially envisioned to be a cover-based, third-person shooter similar to Gears of War. The gameplay underwent multiple iterations, and as development progressed, it became a cover-based FPS. The team later decided to de-emphasize cover after they had created the weapons, as they felt the cover did not complement with the cover-based gameplay. The studio incorporated systems that would support emergent gameplay. Mega Man inspired the slide mechanic, while Scorpion's spear in Mortal Kombat inspired the leash. Through internal focus testing and seeing how fellow developers played the game, the team realized that "people were playing with their enemies like a cat plays with a mouse before he takes it out". This led to the creation of the Skillshots system, which aimed to reward players' creativity. Bleszinski described the game as "the Burnout of shooters", and cited Duke Nukem, Firefly and Serenity as his inspirations.

While the studio had created a playable team deathmatch prototype, they did not incorporate it into the final product because they believed that the market was crowded with competitive FPS at that time. The team created the Anarchy cooperative mode as an alternative. The development of Anarchy began during the late stages of production, and it catered only to hardcore players. He concluded it was the "wrong choice for the online modes" retrospectively. Bleszinski added that the unusual firearms featured in the campaign would not translate well to a competitive game environment, and it would have required PCF to rework all the systems. The game initially had a cooperative mode that allowed friends to play through the campaign together, but it was cancelled after the team had realized that it shifted the game from "being this kind of puzzle shooter into essentially this downhill skiing simulator". Its removal allowed the studio to encourage players to use Skillshots more frequently and enabled the team to create more unique scenarios. The score attack Echoes mode was added in the last six months of production after seeing gamers and journalists competing against each other for high scores playing the game's E3 2010 demo.

Chmielarz recruited Rick Remender in 2009, impressed by his work on comic book series Fear Agent and Black Heart Billy. Remender was invited to visit PCF's headquarters in Warsaw for a week and finished drafting the story with the game's team. The game's story focused on "redemption and revenge", and the planet Stigya, a tourist paradise destroyed by a natural disaster of unknown origin, was to evoke the same feeling as BioShock's Rapture. Remender added that the story telling was not intended to be serious, and that the narrative relied a lot on cliches. The character Ishi was described as "Samurai Spock" while General Sarrano, who was initially only a placeholder villain, was described as a "classic psychopath" and "pure evil". Pulp fiction such as Juan Buscamares (a comic series published in January 1998 in Heavy Metal magazine), Indiana Jones, and men's magazines covers from 1920 to 1970 all helped inspire the game's narrative and visuals. The game was criticized on release for its heavy profanity; Chmielarz responded that as Poles, English's profanity was "exotic and fun to us" and he did not realize that the game had so much of it until he read the Polish translation. The team incorporated a language filter, though Chmielarz noted that few noticed its existence.

== Release ==
In 2008, Electronic Arts announced it would be publishing a new Intellectual property (IP) from independent game developer Epic Games. The name "Bulletstorm" was revealed when game developer People Can Fly filed a trademark request for the name in December 2009. Originally, Epic Games designer Cliff Bleszinski was scheduled to announce the game alongside Gears of War 3 during an appearance on Late Night with Jimmy Fallon on April 8, 2010. However, his appearance was delayed to April 12, 2010. The game was revealed before Bleszinski's scheduled appearance when gaming magazine Game Informer released its May 2010 issue, which mentioned the game on its cover.

EA provided extensive marketing for the game. Epic released a limited edition of Bulletstorm exclusively for the Xbox 360 known as the Epic Edition. The Epic Edition includes bonus in-game content when playing Bulletstorm online, and early access to the multiplayer beta of Gears of War 3. In January 2011, a viral video for Bulletstorm was released, parodying the Halo 3 "Believe" diorama. This was followed in February with the release of Duty Calls: The Calm Before the Storm, a free downloadable PC game that parodies the Call of Duty series as well as general first-person shooter clichés. Players who preordered the Limited Edition for the PC also received a free copy of Klei Entertainment's Shank. A demo of the game, featuring one of the game's Echoes missions, was released on January 25, 2011, for the Xbox 360 and on January 26, 2011, for the PlayStation 3. Following this announcement, Bleszinski wrote a tweet on January 14, 2011, saying the demo was only for PlayStation 3 and Xbox 360, which game reviewers considered was a way of making fun of PC players. Epic Games' vice-president Mark Rein later clarified that a PC demo would be released after the game's release. Epic released it on April 4; it featured the same level as the console versions. The demo attracted more than two million players, though in hindsight, Chmielarz believed the demo had confused players, as the Echo mission did not adequately communicate the experience to the player. The game was released for Windows, PlayStation 3, and Xbox 360 on February 22, 2011. Ragdoll effects, blood, splatter and dismembering were initially censored in the game's German version, despite the German Entertainment Software Rating Board granting it an "Adult" rating. The German rating board later reversed its decision with Bulletstorm: Full Clip Edition, which was allowed to be released uncensored. Both Bleszinski and Chmielarz criticized the game's marketing campaign, which focused extensively on the game's silliness and relied a lot on jokes.

The first downloadable content (DLC) for Bulletstorm, titled Gun Sonata, was released on April 14, 2011, for the PlayStation 3 and Xbox 360, and on May 19, 2011, for the PC. The content includes three Anarchy maps, two Echo missions and two Leash colors. The second DLC, Blood Symphony, was released on June 10, 2011, for Xbox 360. The content includes two "Echoes" maps, three "Anarchy" maps, and a new mode called "The Ultimate Echoes".

=== Remastered version ===
Gearbox Publishing revealed the remastered version during The Game Awards 2016 in December. It increased texture resolution and included support for 4K resolutions, and additional content created by People Can Fly. The remastered version includes new content such as the Overkill Campaign Mode, which starts the players with access to all the game's weapons and six new Echo maps. Those who pre-ordered the game received access to the Duke Nukem's Bulletstorm Tour downloadable content, allowing players to play as Duke Nukem with new voice lines recorded by Jon St. John. Gearbox' Randy Pitchford explained that the remastered version was not a free update for those who already owned the game on Windows because the license was still held by Electronic Arts, and Gearbox had only secured the rights to help People Can Fly create the remaster. In addition, there were issues in transitioning from the discontinued Games for Windows Live platform. Entitled the "Full Clip Edition", the remastered version was released on April 7, 2017, for Windows (with a Lite version, which only contains the campaign), PlayStation 4, and Xbox One. Gearbox sparked controversy when they partnered with game key reseller G2A for the sales of exclusive Collector's Editions of Full Clip Edition. The studio ultimately canceled its agreement with G2A. A port of the Full Clip Edition for the Nintendo Switch, titled Duke of Switch Edition, was released on August 31, 2019.

=== VR version ===
On June 1, 2023, during the 2023 Meta Quest Games Showcase, a VR version, published by People Can Fly and developed by Incuvo, of the game was announced, using Unreal Engine 4. Initially set for release on December 14, 2023 on Meta Quest 2, Meta Quest Pro and PlayStation VR2, the date was later pushed back until January 18, 2024.

== Reception ==
=== Critical reception ===
Reception

Aggregate score
Aggregator	Score
Metacritic	PC: 82/100; PS3: 83/100; X360: 84/100; PC (Full Clip): 76/100; PS4: 75/100; XONE: 82/100; NS: 74/100

Review scores
Publication	Score
1Up.com	B−
Destructoid	9/10
Eurogamer	9/10
Game Informer	9.25/10
GameSpot	8/10
GamesRadar+	5/5
IGN	8/10
Joystiq	4.5/5
PC Gamer (UK)	80/100

According to review aggregator website Metacritic, the game received generally positive reviews upon release.

The game's combat received acclaim. Writing for GameSpot, Kevin VanOrd described the game as "sometimes ludicrous and often ludicrously fun". He praised the skillshot mechanic for tying into the upgrade system as this gave players an incentive to use them during combat. He also enjoyed the weapons, which enables players to fight against enemies in "intriguing" ways. Tim Turi of Game Informer praised the game for offering players a lot of freedom when controlling Grayson, comparing the game favourably to Mirror's Edge. He also applauded how the game allowed players to combine different moves together freely. Rich McCormick of PC Gamer also liked the skillshot system for allowing players to use their creativity to eliminate enemies. However, he noted that this combat loop falls flat during the latter part of the game where players combat more agile mutant enemies. Arthur Gies, an IGN reviewer, described the game as "violently charming". He felt the skillshot system, the weapons, and the responsive gunplay turned Bulletstorm's combat into a success. He noted, though, that by the end of the game, the combat became monotonous and repetitive as the game failed to offer more diverse combat encounters. David Houghton of GamesRadar compared the game to a "3D puzzle game" and a "high-speed strategy game". He described the game as "a very intelligent, highly intricate, and sumptuously nuanced design masquerading as a big dumb action game" and recognized that its gameplay helped evolve the FPS genre.

Critics also generally enjoyed the game's setting and pacing. VanOrd liked the variety in the game's mission design and felt that most of the missions were entertaining and exciting. Despite this, he was disappointed by the game's linear design, making it difficult for the player to control the battlefield when they were facing multiple enemies at once. Gies, Joystiq's Randy Nelson, Christian Donlan of Eurogamer praised the game's setpieces and pacing. Both McCormick and Gies praised the game's visuals and the setting's color palette. Nelson praised Stygia as a setting, describing the campaign as a "wild ride through some truly fantastic, alien locations". Gies also appreciated the game's environmental storytelling, which helped establish Stygia's history and turned it into an interesting setting.

The characters and the writing in the game received a mixed opinion. The characters were conflictingly considered rounded or one-dimensional, and VanOrd called the profanity-filled dialogue "cringe-worthy" and undermined the studio's attempt at serious storytelling. Nelson, in contrast, believed the use of profanities fit tonally with the game and offered moments of levity following combat-heavy sequences. Gies described the set-up as original and liked the characters, though he criticized the anticlimactic ending. Nick Chester, writing for Destructoid, said the entertaining story complemented the gameplay fairly well, though he noted the narrative relied on pulp fiction clichés and predictable plot twists. Taylor Cocke of 1Up.com liked how the game parodied other FPS writing and that it broke free of a focus on melodrama. However, he remarked the story was overly serious, and the campaign was dragged down by the stark contrast between the tone of the story and the chaotic and creative nature of the combat.

The multiplayer component of the game received lackluster reviews. VanOrd felt the multiplayer was fun but limited in scope. He remarked that the experience, while mostly rewarding, could be frustrating if the players were joined by strangers. He added the mode's maps were too small and players may get bored easily because of a lack of variety. Gies shared a similar sentiment, writing that Anarchy became repetitive very quickly. Gies labeled the absence of campaign co-op as a missed opportunity. While he called Echo a good inclusion, he was disappointed that the leaderboard was not incorporated into the game's main campaign. Nelson liked the Anarchy mode for including new Skillshots, but called the Echo mode "cut-and-dry". Donlan liked the Echo mode for being a distilled experience, which disregarded the story elements completely and compared the leaderboard competition favorably to that of Need for Speed: Hot Pursuit and Zuma Blitz.

The remastered version also received generally positive reviews. Scott Butterworth of GameSpot praised the upgraded textures and visuals, "impressive" draw distance and stable frame rate. However, he was disappointed that the Duke Nukem DLC did not meaningfully change the story or change the cutscenes. IGN's Lucy O'Brien praised the improved lighting system and believed that the improved visuals helped elevate the intensity and the urgency of the game's setpieces. However, she noted the original game showed its age due to the presence of invisible walls and the lack of a dedicated jump button. She expressed her disappointment that PCF did not add much that was new to the remaster. Reviewing the Nintendo Switch version, PJ O'Reilly of Nintendo Life expressed his disappointment regarding the absence of multiplayer and the lack of gyroscopic controls. The VR version of the game was panned. Scott Hayden from Road to VR felt that the gameplay was "more tedious and less fluid overall", and remarked that the game was "not only uglier than the original, but less fun overall". Ian Higton from Eurogamer described it as an "incredibly sloppy, clumsily produced VR port".

=== Fox News controversy ===
On February 8, 2011, the game came under scrutiny by Fox News in an article on their website by John Brandon, a televised broadcast and another article. Part of a Fox News panel was psychologist Carole Lieberman, who said, "The increase in rapes can be attributed in large part to the playing out of [sexual] scenes in video games". Her statement caused enraged gamers to review bomb her book on Amazon. Lieberman later responded by saying that her quotes were taken out of context by Brandon. Nonetheless, she continued to draw correlations between rape and sexual content in video games, claiming to have "thousands" of research papers supporting her claim. To support her claim, Lieberman referred to eight sources, one of them being Bulletstorm. Rock, Paper, Shotgun analysed Lieberman's claims, and found only one of eight sources she provided had anything to do with the subject at hand. Kotaku also quoted data from US Department of Justice that the number of rape cases have been declining since 1973, though Lieberman disputed this by saying that the official rape statistics were "known to be variable and unreliable". Dr. Mark Griffiths, a professor at Nottingham Trent University, whose lectures focused on video game addiction, described Fox's news piece as "sensationalist" in a Guardian interview. He added it would be very difficult to prove that exposure to sexual content in video games contributed to rape crimes because of the large number of confounding factors involved. Brandon followed up his report on February 20, adding that the gaming press "reacted violently" and the experts he had talked to "were nearly universally worried that video game violence may be reaching a fever pitch". Rock, Paper, Shotgun later contacted the experts, most of whom said they had never said there is a conclusive link between video game violence and real world violence.

EA defended the game's developers and the game. Its vice president of public relations, Tammy Schachter, wrote the publisher had followed the policies established by the ESRB and marketed the game only to a mature audience. She added that "much like Tarantino's Kill Bill or Rodriguez's Sin City, this game is an expression of creative entertainment for adults." Epic's CEO Mike Capps added that the Fox News controversy helped the game reach a wider audience, and he was delighted the gaming press helped defend the game. He noted his concern that the Fox News piece may mislead an uninformed public.

=== Sales ===
EA had high sales expectations for the game. David DeMartini, an EA executive, remarked the game had the potential to perform as well as the Gears of War games. In the United Kingdom, Bulletstorm was the second best-selling video game in its release week behind Killzone 3. In the US, it was the seventh best-selling game in February 2011. It sold around 300,000 units in February; the Xbox 360 was the platform of choice for most players. Capps added the game did not turn a profit for Epic, while an unnamed source from EA revealed that the game "underperformed" for them. In 2013, it was revealed the game sold just under one million copies. Capps added that the game did not sell well on the PC, citing piracy as the main reason behind its disappointing performance, though he admitted it was not a very good port. Chmielarz initially blamed the game's EA marketing, which reduced "fresh ideas to dick-jokes for dude-bros". He later recognized the game was the victim of an industry shift, as smaller-tier games were slowly being phased out. However, Sebastian Wojciechowski, the CEO of People Can Fly following their split from Epic, felt the game sold well, adding it would never be considered as successful or profitable as Epic's Gears of War series at the time.

Bulletstorm: Full Clip Edition debuted as the 23rd best-selling game in the UK in its release week. Wojciechowski added that the sales of the remaster "went really, really well" and that it validated the studio's belief that it should do something with the IP in the future.

== Sequel ==
According to Capps, the studio had begun development of Bulletstorm's sequel but was sidelined as Epic assigned PCF to work on Gears of War: Judgement, a spin-off in the Gears of War series. PCF became independent in 2015 following a management buyout, and it retained the intellectual property rights to Bulletstorm. Speaking about a potential sequel in 2019, Wojciechowski, said the studio wanted the IP to have a "second life" despite the fact that it was not the studio's short-term goal. Wojciechowski added that should the studio return to the IP, they would consider ways to make it more popular.

== See also ==
- List of commercial failures in video gaming
