= Augustus Cole =

Fictional character in the Gears of War video game series

- Gears of War character
- Augustus Cole as he appears in Gears of War: Ultimate Edition (2015)
- First appearance: Gears of War (2006)
- Designed by: Cliff Bleszinski
- Voiced by: Lester Speight

In-universe information
- Family: Mr. Cole (father); Mrs. Cole (mother)
- Spouse: Unnamed wife
- Children: Hana Cole (daughter)

Augustus "Cole Train" Cole is a fictional character in the Gears of War media franchise. He first appeared in the first video game of the series as a supporting character, and has since appeared in some capacity for every mainline and spin-off installment of the Gears of War franchise. Cole is voiced by Lester Speight in all of his video game appearances.

Within the series, Cole is a former star athlete in his youth who participated in humanity's war with the Locust Horde on the planet Sera by enlisting with the Coalition of Ordered Governments ("COG"), a supranational and intergovernmental military collective who are the dominant human political force on Sera. Cole has spent most of his military career alongside his close friend, Damon Baird; unlike Baird and most of Cole's teammates, who are often dour or cynical in temperament, he is usually depicted as a vibrant, enthusiastic character known for his brash humor and infectious energy.

While Cole has earned a mostly positive reception and is noted as a fan-favorite character, some critics have accused him of being a racial stereotype. The character was the subject of legal action launched by Lenwood Hamilton, a former National Football League player who claimed that his publicity rights was infringed upon because the video game character had a number of features he alleged were identified with him or his public persona. Various merchandise for the character, as with other of the series' characters, has been released.

== Creation and development ==
Lester Speight voiced Cole in all of his appearances.

Cole is named after Phil Cole, a level designer at Epic Games. Cole is concepted as an ex-professional player of Thrashball, a contact sport heavily inspired by American football, prior to the events of the video game series. Cole and Baird's roles were originally reversed, with David Beckham as the inspiration for Baird as a sports star. Former The Coalition studio head Rod Fergusson revealed in an interview that Cole was originally going to be named "Gus the Bus", but the developers were concerned that they would infringe on the nickname of a Pittsburgh Steelers football player who matched the Bus reference; as a result, the studio went with the name "Cole Train" instead. Fergusson noted that players would be able to pick up references about "Gus" if they have played the original game as John DiMaggio, Marcus Fenix's voice actor, was instructed to say the "Gus" line with Cole, but the studio did not do much more from a dialogue perspective. The development team later used Jamie Foxx's character from the sports drama movie Any Given Sunday as Cole's archetype.

For Gears of War 3, Cole was originally meant to play a more prominent role; players were supposed to be able to swap between Fenix and Cole throughout the progression of the single player campaign. Cole has a daughter named Hana who first appears in the Hivebusters comic series to support the eponymous squad in their endeavours. The developers originally intended for Hana to appear in the main campaign of Gears 5, but due to story changes during the game's development, her character no longer fit into its narrative; instead, she is redesigned as a scientist who develops a method for infiltrating and destroying enemy Swarm Hives from within in the spin-off Hivebusters comic, which takes place in parallel with the events of Gears 5.

Cole is Lester Speight's first role in the video game industry. Speight said the character's popularity led to many fans identifying him as Cole, and they would regularly express their excitement towards him and his work via social media sites, websites and in person. Dan Ryckert from Game Informer have noted the real-life resemblance of Speight, a former footballer, to his character, commenting that "casting choices don't get much easier than this".

== Appearances ==
In Gears of War, Cole and Baird are first encountered by Marcus Fenix and Dominic Santiago as the surviving members of Alpha Squad. Cole joined Delta Squad after the rest of Alpha Squad is confirmed to be killed in action, and he would remain with Delta Squad throughout the original Gears of War trilogy. He is well known as a sports celebrity in Sera for his career as a Thrashball player prior to "Emergence Day", when the Locust Horde first emerged from their subterranean lairs to wage a genocidal war of attrition against humanity 14 years before the events of the first and eponymous video game of the series. In the Gears of War 3 single player campaign, Cole is a playable character from Act One, Chapter 3 until the beginning of Act Two, where he leads a small force to search for supplies in his hometown of Hanover. In Gears of War: Judgement, a prequel set a few months after Emergence Day, Cole appears as one of the game's playable protagonists and a member of Kilo Squad along with squad leader Baird, Onyx Guard cadet Sofia Hendrick and former UIR soldier Garron Paduk.

By the events of Gears of War 4, which is set more than two decades after the conclusion of the war with the Locust Horde, Cole is regarded by the public as a respected war veteran. He appears in the opening sequence of the game with Victor Hoffman and Samantha Byrne during a speech by COG First Minister Jinn. He appears in the last act to aid Marcus and his son J.D., along with their associates Kait Diaz and Delmont "Del" Walker. He also appears in Gears 5 as part of the war effort against the Swarm, the successor to the original Locust Horde. Cole has remained at the rank of private throughout his entire military career as he has rejected every military promotion that has been offered, under the grounds that having rank is not going to affect how many enemies he can kill.

Doctor Hana Cole appears as a supporting character in the Gears 5 downloadable content expansion pack, Hivebusters. Hana tells Team Scorpio that her father was the one who connected her with Colonel Victor Hoffman for the Hivebuster operation and that Cole's introspection on the military and the war had kept her away from the military industrial complex of the COG administration, which is what Cole had wanted. Unlike her father, she takes after her unnamed mother with regards to her lack of interest in sports.

In Gears of War: E-Day, Cole can be heard on a news broadcast in the prolouge and is featured on some of the game's collectibles. Cole doesn't make an in person appearance as he is still a sports star at the time.

Cole is available as a playable character in the franchise's spin-off titles: Gears Pop! and in Gears Tactics as a pre-order exclusive.

== Promotion and reception ==
Like other characters in the Gears of War franchise, Augustus Cole has been subject to various merchandise. In 2011, Epic Games released a "Cole Train Thrashball statue" depicting Cole wearing a Thrashball-themed sports uniform. It is made out of pure resin and weighs 6.4 pounds.

Cole has received a mostly positive critical reception, and is noted as a fan-favorite character. In August 2007, North American game-related cable TV channel G4 awarded Speight "Best Voiceover" for his performance as Augustus Cole. Staff of the gaming section of the Australian publication The Age ranked Cole #12 on their list of Top 50 Xbox characters of all time in 2008, praising the character for injecting a much-needed dose of comedy and personality into the series. In 2011, Cole placed #46 on a reader's poll organized by Guinness Book of Records for the top 50 video game characters of all time. In an article published by Red Bull, Pete Dreyer included Cole in his list of 10 video game sidekicks who deserve their own games.

A rap song performed in-character by Speight for the end credit of the 2007 video game was positively received. Tamoor Hussain from GameSpot praised a new version of the track which was featured in a trailer promoting the release of Gears of War Ultimate Edition in 2016. Hussain compared it to the song Dead Presidents II by JayZ.

On the other hand, Cole's characterization has also attracted criticism concerning racial stereotypes about black people. Marc Nix from IGN argued in favor of this point, contrasting Cole's stereotypical speech patterns to Captain Anderson of the Mass Effect series or Dr. Eli Vance of the Half-Life series; Nix noted that both characters have African American heritage, though neither speak in dialog written specifically for a black character, and are simply presented as video game characters that happen to be black. Crystal Dynamics producer Morgan Gray argued that his slang and exaggerated persona reproduced a familiar model for black video game characters despite the game's otherwise invented setting. Gray distinguished this objection from his enjoyment of the game and questioned why Marcus could not instead have been Black. Bitmob criticized Epic Games for designing Cole as a culturally insensitive character who perpetuates outdated ideas of African-Americans, and drew an unfavorable comparison to Dominic Santiago, who is a coded as a Latino character and is depicted as "cool and level-headed" by comparison.

Allistair Pinsof from Destructoid criticized the story segment in the single player campaign of Gears of War 3 where the player assumes control of Cole. Pinsof opined that Cole's sudden flashback is abrupt and ends with no real meaningful ties to the main Gears narrative, noting that what little backstory it provides for Cole is shallow at best, and that the character's behavior puts everyone including himself in serious danger.

=== Legal issues ===
In January 2017, former American football player Lenwood Hamilton sued Epic Games, Microsoft, and Speight, alleging that the character of Augustus Cole is taken from his own likeness and voice without his consent. Hamilton claimed that Speight had approached him around 1998 about a video game, though Hamilton had turned it down due to the violence that would be in the game. The lawsuit contended that elements of Cole's character, including his ethnic background, Cole Train nickname, renown for playing professional sports, and clothing were all elements representative of Hamilton, and alleged that voice analysis shows that Speight's delivery of Cole's lines matches closely with Hamilton's speech patterns. Lenwood was ultimately unsuccessful in his bid: according to a Pennsylvania federal court, a motion by Microsoft, Lester Speight and the other defendants for summary judgment on First Amendment grounds was granted, and that the defendants' First Amendment right to free expression in creating the Augustus Cole character that allegedly resembled plaintiff outweighed plaintiff's right of publicity."
