= Kait Diaz =

Fictional character in Gears of War franchise

- Gears of War character
- Kait Diaz as she appears in Gears 5 (2019)
- First appearance: Gears of War 4 (2016)
- Created by: The Coalition
- Voiced by: Laura Bailey

In-universe information
- Family: Gabriel Diaz (father); Reyna Diaz (mother)
- Relatives: Oscar Diaz (uncle); Myrrah (grandmother)

Kait Diaz is a fictional character in the Gears of War franchise. She first appeared in Gears of War 4 as a supporting character, and is the main protagonist of Gears 5. Within the series, she is originally a member of the Outsiders, a loosely organized faction of rebel human settlers who live outside of the walled city states of the supranational and intergovernmental military collective known as the Coalition of Ordered Governments ("COG"), following the conclusion of humanity's war with the Locust Horde on the planet Sera. By the events of Gears 5, she has enlisted with the COG armed forces and has attained the rank of corporal. The character is voiced by Laura Bailey in each of her appearances. Outside of the video game series, Kait has appeared in the novels Gears of War: Ascendance and Gears of War: Bloodlines.

Kait Diaz is the first lead female character of the Gears of War video game franchise, which is predominantly known for its hypermasculine male characters. The Coalition, a subsidiary of Xbox Game Studios and the current developers responsible for the Gears of War franchise following its acquisition from Epic Games, wanted to create a strong female lead and wrote the narrative arc of the fourth and fifth installments of the franchise around the character.

Kait has received a positive critical reception for her nuanced characterization, strong backstory, and as a positive example of gender equality and representation in video games. Various merchandise for the character, as with other of the series' characters, has been released.

== Creation and development ==
Kait Diaz is designed as a character with Latino roots; the Coalition's character designers mixed Latino-inspired physical traits with typically Caucasian features to give her an "interesting look". Her less regimented look is a reflection of her youthful urge to stand out among her peers, as well as her literal background as an "Outsider" compared to the other main characters in Gears of War 4; unlike J.D. Fenix, son of Marcus Fenix and Anya Stroud, and Delmont "Del" Walker, Kait is an Outsider from birth and her attire has a completely different look without any visual cues that would connect her to COG society. She utilizes reclaimed fabric and her wardrobe has multipurpose elements. The beanie she wears help maintain her aesthetic as a grounded character. One of the ways the designers have explored the Outsider culture of Sera through visual language is through the hairstyles of its female members, which is an indicator of their marital status: Kait's mother, Reyna Diaz, hangs her ponytail over her right shoulder, while hers is hung on the left shoulder as she is single.

Then-studio head Rod Fergusson compared the story arc of Gears of War 4 to Mad Max: Fury Road, in the sense that Tom Hardy's Max Rockatansky is functionally a supporting character even though he is ostensibly the eponymous lead character of the movie. He further elaborated that, "Max is really there to support Furiosa's journey as she's trying to escape, and that's kind of what Gears 4 was. [It] was really Kait's story about trying to save her mom, and JD was there to help."

Kait's transition from a supporting character to protagonist in Gears 5 is reflected by the ending of its prequel, where it is revealed that her past is connected to the new threat facing the world of Sera. She wears COG-issued armor as she has enlisted with the organization as a soldier by the events of Gears 5. The designers explored different looks for Kait that evolved from her Gears of War 4 attire as well as armor variations which match the different environments she visits, while preserving a few elements of her Outsider heritage, especially her braid.

The Coalition staff have disclosed during interviews that the decision to place Kait as the protagonist in Gears 5 was planned over a number of years, and it involved change on a cultural level for the company. Fillip Foksowicz, a game designer at The Coalition, said that Fergusson and the game's team of writers decided early on during the production of Gears 5 that they wanted to have a female lead, and so the game's whole story was written around Kait, in his words "fully embracing her as a female and truly showing all of her strengths". Foksowicz said the team understood that they could not simply write a story and replace certain characters with females or various cultural backgrounds where it fit simply to meet a predetermined quota, as it would not be possible to truly define them as believable characters. According to franchise narrative lead Bonnie Jean Mah, a strong, well-rounded female character is "someone who is authentic and has a full range of emotions", and she claimed that her company ensured that there is ample opportunities for participation by female staff in the game's developmental team.

== Appearances ==
=== Video games ===
Kait is introduced in Gears of War 4 as a part of a group of Outsiders including J.D. and Del, two COG deserters. The trio, led by J.D., are the main focus of the game's narrative as they discover a new threat to humanity, a successor to the original Locust Horde known as the Swarm, who has kidnapped numerous victims from various human settlements, including Kait's mother Reyna and uncle Oscar. By the game's ending, Kait comes into possession of an amulet that once belonged to Myrrah, Queen of the Locust Horde, after she is forced to euthanize Reyna.

Kait is the central character of Gears 5, which explores her backstory as she plays a pivotal role in humanity's conflict against the resurgent Swarm. She is depicted as enduring recurring nightmares she believes to be messages. Following the death of Oscar, who led an Outsider settlement called Riftworm Village in their defense against a Swarm raid, she travels to a remote area in search of answers about her maternal family's connection to the origins of the Locust Horde. She eventually discovers that Queen Myrrah is her grandmother, and that a resurrected and mutated Reyna has succeeded her estranged mother Myrrah in leading a genocidal war against humanity.

Gears Tactics, a spin-off of the Gears of War franchise, features Kait's father Sgt. Gabriel Diaz as the protagonist and details how he first met Reyna Diaz (née Torres).

=== Novels ===
Kait is one of the main characters of Gears of War: Ascendance, a novel which acted set between Gears of War 4 and Gears 5. She is also the main character of Gears of War: Bloodlines, which is set during the intervening four months between the evacuation of Settlement 2 and the siege of Riftworm Village in Gears 5. In the latter novel, Kait explores her family's past by learning more about her father, Lieutenant Colonel later Sergeant Gabriel Diaz, who died of Rustlung when she was young. The ending hints at the events of Gears Tactics with Colonel Victor Hoffman telling Kait to pay attention if she ever hears the name Ukkon. Kait thinks she heard Ukkon's name at some point when she was a child, but can't remember when or how as if the memory has been blocked from her mind.

== Promotion and reception ==
Kait Diaz has been extensively featured by Microsoft in advertising for the Gears of War franchise since the launch of Gears 5 in 2019. Like other characters in the franchise, she has been subject to various merchandise. In 2016, McFarlane Toys released a highly detailed action figure for the character, which stands 7 inches tall, rests atop a stand, and includes her weapon in-hand. In 2019, statue makers First 4 Figures unveiled a resin statue in the character's likeness. A limited edition Xbox One controller named after the character, with a snow-weathered finish and COG emblem, was released on August 20, 2019, as a standalone purchase and was also included in a Limited Edition Bundle for Gears 5.

Kait Diaz has received a positive critical response. In his review of Gears of War 4 for The Guardian in October 2016, Steve Boxer noted that Kait is the franchise's first properly central female character and was positive in his assessment of the game's campaign and cast of characters. Kait's depiction in Gears 5 drew critical praise for her level of complexity, range of emotions, and strong backstory. Multiple sources formed a view that her role in Gears 5 led to more nuance in its narrative, and brought more emotional depth and maturity to the series as a whole. George Yang from The Escapist opined that Gears 5 was able to pivot the narrative to explore Kait's story in a way that felt natural, because the strong story of the Gears series allows Kait to be in the spotlight since questions about her lineage appeared in Gears of War 4. Sam Byford from The Verge was of the view that the game's plot does a great job throughout of establishing the stakes on both a personal and global level, giving emotional momentum to the storytelling about Kait's exploration of her heritage even as the world is on the brink of collapse. In his review of Gears 5 for The Bleacher Report, Chris Roling said that Kait's past and conflicts "are exploited for some excellent, creative gameplay sequences even longtime fans of the series won't see coming". John Saavedra from Den of Geek opined that Kait and Del outshone the series’ original duo of Marcus Fenix and Dominic Santiago as they have actual personalities and motivations that go beyond “killing Grubs”, highlighting their banter to be a delightful experience which adds necessary levity to a plot that often place its characters in tragic circumstances. Kaan Serin from TheXboxHub proclaimed the character to be one of the best heroines in gaming.

The decision by the Coalition to feature Kait as the central protagonist of Gears 5 attracted significant media coverage. Several sources have commented that the decision to promote a female side character to series protagonist represents a major departure in creative direction for the series, and an important development for the games as a whole. This is due to the fact that the Gears of War game franchise is stereotyped for being a “bro-shooter” and for its "dudebro machismo". Many industry watchers perceived the replacement of lead character Marcus Fenix with Kait Diaz as a bold move by the developer. Brittany Vincent observed that while the series has had female characters like Anya Stroud to help punctuate the narrative, this is the first time "a woman has been at the forefront" for the series. She compared this to "swapping in Spartan Kat in for her own personal Halo title instead of giving her a little time in Halo: Reach". Byford said the shift in focus "does wonders", noting that the franchise's move to its first female lead does not feel forced, nor was it ever directly acknowledged. Todd Martens from The Los Angeles Times noted that Kait's story arc helped bring a sense of mystery to a series filled with monstrous villains and chainsaw guns while reducing the unnecessary machismo prevalent in previous installments. Terry Terrones from The Gazette claimed that Kait makes for a fascinating protagonist and her personal journey gives the franchise a completely new look, even with the presence of Marcus Fenix and his son J.D. within the narrative. Owen Gough felt that the narrative of Gears 5 benefited from an exciting new lead in Kait "who manages to revitalise the male-only club of killing monsters, without feeling like it's pandering to an expanded audience". Similarly, Roling found Kait's plot points in the narrative to be well handled and remains engaging throughout without being "stereotypical gender fodder". Shaun Munro from Flickering Myth considered Kait to be the most sympathetic and likeable character in the entire Gears series and a more appealing protagonist then J.D., whom he dismissed as a "dullard". Reflecting on the issue of female leads in video games being perceived as a risky proposition, senior producer at The Coalition Zöe Curnoe expressed a desire to see the normalization of women leads in video games and that it would no longer be a newsworthy topic.

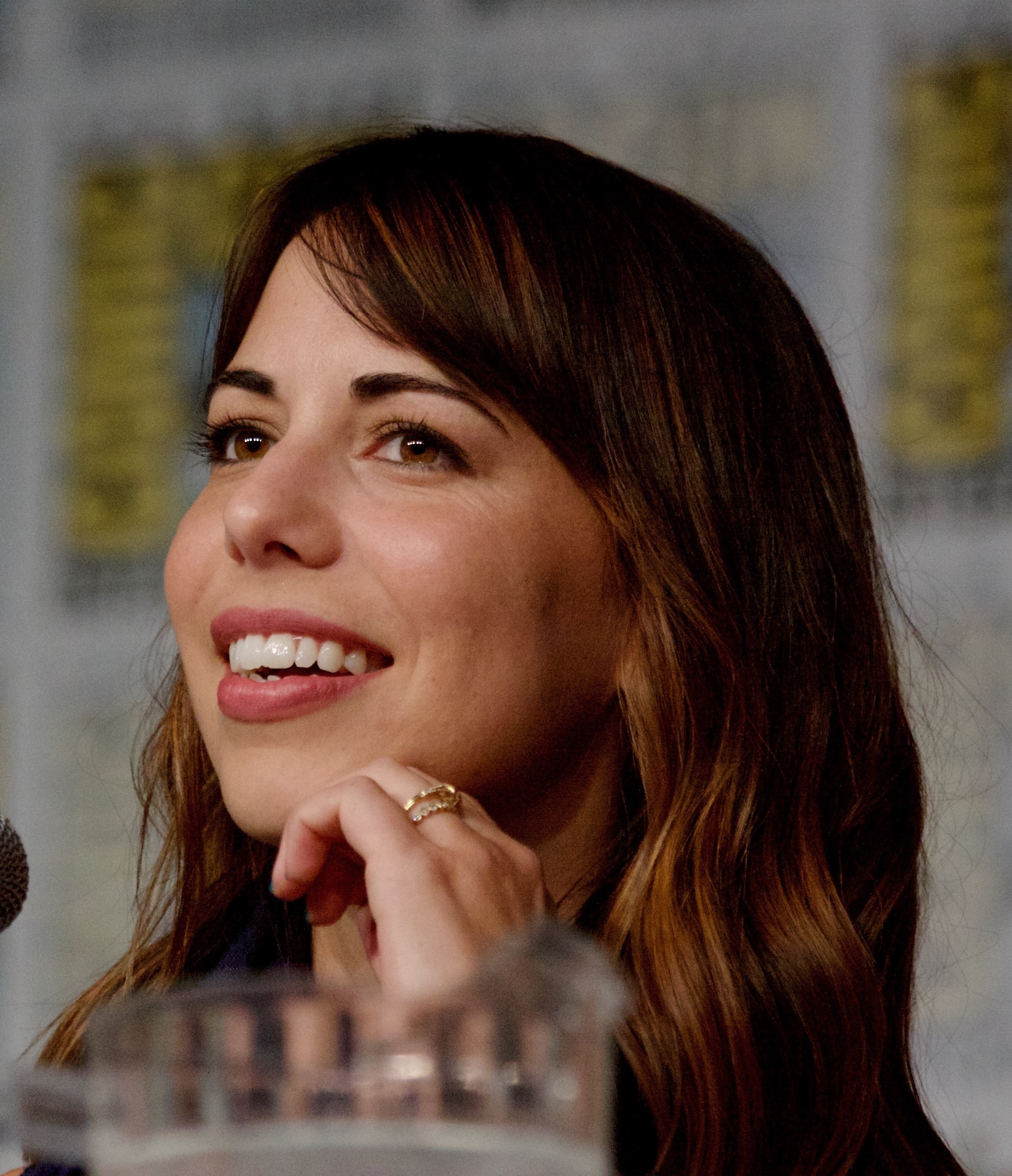
Laura Bailey voiced Kait Diaz for all video game appearances.

On the other hand, Osama Niazi from Segment Next expressed concern that The Coalition may not have adequately prepared for a hostile backlash from certain segments of the video game player audience with misogynistic attitudes, citing the significant negative reception to the promotion of female playable characters in Battlefield V as an example. Sherif Saed from VG247 reported an incident which took place during a Q&A session at an E3 Coliseum panel in June 2019 where John DiMaggio, the voice actor of Marcus Fenix and a panel member, reprimanded an audience member who queried the hosts about Kait Diaz's “sexual preference”. Saed suggested that DiMaggio's response to the way the question was worded implied that it may have been asked in bad faith.

Laura Bailey's performance as Kait Diaz has received critical acclaim from several reviewers. Byford credited Bailey's strong performance with anchoring Kait's personal struggles in a believable manner, which play out with a surprisingly delicate touch and includes some genuinely shocking moments. For her performance as Kait Diaz, Bailey received nominations for best video game performance of the year award from a few outlets. On the other hand, Alan Wen remarked that Kait is a Hispanic character being played by a white Caucasian actor in his analysis of the issue of whitewashing as well as the lack of opportunities for voice actors from ethnic minority backgrounds.
