= Lester Speight =

American professional wrestler and actor

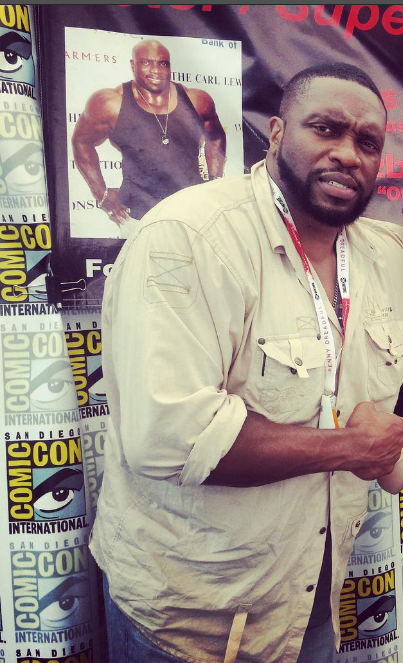
- Speight in 2016
- Born: August 28, 1963 (age 63); Baltimore, Maryland, U.S.
- Education: Morgan State University
- Occupations: Football player, wrestler, actor
- Years active: 1991–1998 (wrestling); 1997–present (acting)
- Known for: Terry Tate: Office Linebacker; My Wife and Kids; Gears of War
Lester Speight
Professional wrestling career
- Billed from: Jamaica
- Debut: June 28, 1991
- Retired: April 18, 1998

Lester Speight (born August 28, 1963), also known as Rasta, is an American actor, former football player and professional wrestler. He achieved significant recognition for his portrayal of Terry Tate: Office Linebacker in a series of Reebok commercials that debuted during Super Bowl XXXVII, and received further recognition for his portrayal of Augustus Cole in the Gears of War series of video games.

== Early life, family and education ==
Lester Speight was born in Baltimore, Maryland, the son of Gussie Watson and Walter Speight. He graduated from Old Mill High School in Millersville, Maryland in 1981, where he is in its Hall of Fame for three sports: football, track, and basketball.

He attended Morgan State University from 1981 to 1985 and was a Division 1 All-American Linebacker.

== Professional football and professional wrestling ==
After graduating college in 1985, he attempted to play in the NFL but did not. He tried out for the United States Football League (USFL) the same year. During tryouts, he ran the 40-yard dash in 4.3 seconds, which received attention of the Baltimore Stars. Speight and business manager/cousin Butch Groover negotiated a two-year deal with the Stars for more than $200,000. However, the USFL folded before he even played one season. He was with the New York Giants in 1987 as a replacement player during the 1987 NFL strike, but he did not play in any games.

Speight moved on to professional wrestling, working for Global Wrestling Federation and Catch Wrestling Association as Rasta the Voodoo Man. However, by 1997 he quit wrestling to pursue an acting career.

== Acting career ==
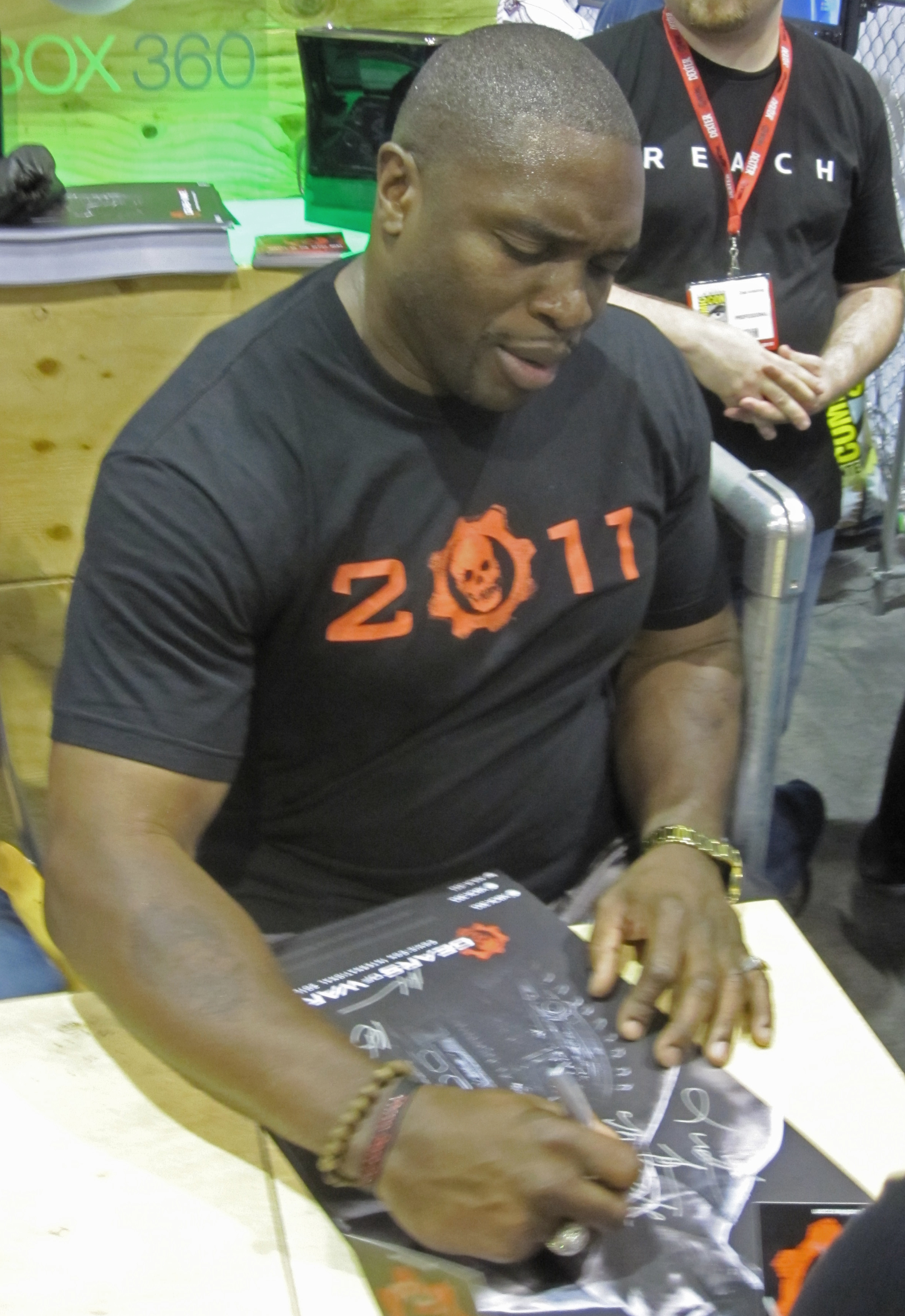
Speight appears at San Diego Comic-Con in 2010 in support of the Gears of War 3 video game.

Speight began his acting career in minor roles in many films including the football film Any Given Sunday, 13 Moons and as the club doorman in Cradle 2 the Grave. He has also appeared in many television shows such as Malcolm in the Middle, Walker, Texas Ranger, NYPD Blue, Arli$$, My Wife and Kids, and NCIS: Los Angeles.

=== Commercials ===
In 2003, Speight starred in the Terry Tate: Office Linebacker ad for Reebok. The ad is notable for its popularity as a Superbowl commercial. The exposure from the commercial opened the door for further opportunities in film, television, and video games.

=== Television ===
Following the success of Terry Tate, Speight had a recurring role on Damon Wayans' ABC series My Wife and Kids as Calvin Scott, the father of Vanessa Scott. Speight guest-starred as prison inmate Banks on the show Prison Break. Speight appeared in an episode of ESPN's Mayne Street comedy short. In the 2008 TV film Ring of Death, Speight played convict "Milton Kennedy", a feared and revered gang boss (nicknamed "The President"), and undefeated champion of an underground fighting tournament in a notorious prison. In 2009, Speight appeared in an episode of Bones, "Double Trouble in the Panhandle", where he played the Traveling Circus' strongman, Magnum.

=== Film ===
Speight had a small role in the film Bachelor Party Vegas, as Gold Tooth, a prison rapist in 2006, before joining the Eddie Murphy motion picture Norbit as Blue, one of the three brothers of Rasputia, in 2007. The next year, he appeared in Harold & Kumar Escape from Guantanamo Bay, as a character who is interrogated using racist methods. In 2011, Speight played "Hardcore" Eddie in the Michael Bay blockbuster Transformers: Dark of the Moon.

=== Video games ===
For the 2006 Xbox 360 game Gears of War, Speight voiced the role of former "Thrashball" player Augustus Cole (a.k.a. Cole Train), humorously re-using some of his characteristic lines. He won the G-Phoria '07 award for Best Voiceover. Speight later reprised the role for Gears of War 2 (2008), Gears of War 3 (2011), Gears of War: Judgment (2013), Gears of War 4 (2016), Gears 5 (2019), and Gears Tactics (2020).

== Filmography ==
=== Films ===
- 1993: The Meteor Man - Gang Member #1
- 1999: International Khiladi - Gang Member
- 1999: Any Given Sunday - Sharks' Security Guard
- 2002: 13 Moons - Vincent
- 2003: Cradle 2 the Grave - Chambers Club Doorman
- 2006: Bachelor Party Vegas - Gold Tooth
- 2007: Norbit - Blue Latimore
- 2007: Who's Your Caddy - Hardcore Inmate
- 2008: Harold & Kumar Escape from Guantanamo Bay - Dr. Jonavan White
- 2008: Finding Amanda - Black guy #1
- 2008: Ring of Death - The President
- 2008: Unemployed - Jacker #1
- 2010: Something like a Business - Rockstone
- 2010: Knucklehead - Redrum
- 2010: Faster - Hovis Nixon/Baphomet
- 2011: Peep World - Wizdom
- 2011: Transformers: Dark of the Moon - Hardcore Eddy
- 2014: All Hail the King - Herman
- 2014: My Dad's a Soccer Mom
- 2017: Speech & Debate

=== TV Series ===
- 2000: Walker, Texas Ranger - Flash Armstrong (Episode: The Avenging Angel)
- 2001: That’s My Bush - Kid Spandex (Credited as Mighty Rasta) (Episode: Fare Thee Welfare)
- 2003-2005: My Wife and Kids - Calvin Scott
- 2003: NYPD Blue - Steve (Episode: Cops and Robbers)
- 2003: Malcolm in the Middle - Samuel (Episode: Long Drive)
- 2007: Prison Break - Inmate (Episode: John Doe)
- 2009: Bones - Magnum (Episode: Double Trouble in the Panhandle)
- 2009: Cold Case - Virgil 'Sticky' Jones (Episode: Read Between the Lines)
- 2015: Scorpion - Ten-Ton (Episode: Fish Filet)
- 2016: In the Cut - Gordon (Episode: Jailbreak)
- 2017: NCIS: Los Angeles - Max 'Champ' Champion (Episode: Queen Pin)
- 2017: The Mick - Dominic (Episode: The Visit)
- 2018: Titans - Clayton Williams/Mr. Atlas (Episode: Jason Todd)

=== Video games ===
- 2006: Gears of War - Augustus Cole
- 2008: Gears of War 2 - Augustus Cole
- 2011: Gears of War 3 - Augustus Cole
- 2013: Gears of War: Judgment - Augustus Cole
- 2016: Gears of War 4 - Augustus Cole
- 2019: Gears 5 - Augustus Cole
- 2026: Gears of War: E-Day - Augustus Cole

=== Other ===
- Kimberly-Clark Healthy Workplace project (2012) - Eugene Hammer
- "Bring It On" music video by Kasland - Augustus "Cole Train" Cole
