= Gears Tactics =

- Developers: Splash Damage; The Coalition
- Publisher: Xbox Game Studios
- Director: Steve Venezia
- Producer: Darren Wood
- Designers: Tyler Bielman; Alex Skidmore
- Programmers: Kate Rayner; Cam McRae
- Artist: Greg Juby
- Writers: Taylor Clark; Tom Bissell
- Composer: Edward Patrick White
- Series: Gears of War
- Engine: Unreal Engine 4
- Platforms: Windows; Xbox One; Xbox Series X/S
- Release: Windows; April 28, 2020; Xbox One, Xbox Series X/S; November 10, 2020
- Genre: Turn-based tactics
- Mode: Single-player

Gears Tactics is a turn-based tactics video game developed by Splash Damage in conjunction with The Coalition and published by Xbox Game Studios. It is a spin-off of the Gears of War franchise and a prequel to the first game. The game was released first for Windows on April 28, 2020 and subsequently for Xbox One and Xbox Series X/S on November 10, 2020.

== Gameplay ==
The game is played from a top-down perspective and is a turn-based tactics title in which players issue commands to a squad of human soldiers to eliminate the hostiles in a map and depending on the mission, complete secondary objectives. Players can freely explore the map without being confined to a grid. Each character can perform three actions, such as taking cover, shooting enemies, or remain in overwatch to shoot any moving enemy in their line of sight. When an enemy unit loses most of its health, a friendly unit can move in and execute the downed enemy, which gives all units an additional action point. Players need to throw grenades to destroy erupting Emergence Holes which spawn more Locust enemies. If a friendly unit is downed, players can revive them to bring them back into battle with reduced health. The game has five distinct character classes, with each having its own unique abilities. The characters can be extensively customized with mods, armours, and they can acquire new skills after they level up. Other than story-important "hero" characters, other friendly units are procedurally generated and should these units die in combat, their deaths will be permanent.

In addition to the main campaign, players can complete different side-missions. At numerous points in the story, the player is required to complete one or more side missions to proceed. After the player finishes the campaign, Veteran Mode will be unlocked. It allows players to remix the campaign missions with different modifiers such as bonus damages and accuracy penalty. The game, however, does not have a multiplayer mode.

== Synopsis ==
=== Setting ===
One year before the game, a subterranean race of creatures called the Locust Horde emerged on the surface and began a genocidal war against the humans of Sera. The sole surviving government, the Coalition of Ordered Governments (COG), fell back to the COG capital of Ephyra on the Jacinto Plateau where the Locust cannot dig through its granite bedrock. To prevent the Locust from invading the plateau and to deny them the spoils of war, COG leader - Chairman Richard Prescott (Liam O'Brien) - orders all major cities outside the plateau to be incinerated by the Hammer of Dawn (HOD), a satellite weapon of mass destruction capable of delivering laser strikes to the surface, in a scorched earth campaign. In addition, Prescott deployed a mop-up detachment in key-cities to eradicate the surviving Locust. In the city of Aldair, the mop-up crew of Alpha Squad is led by Sergeant Gabriel Diaz (Noshir Dalal), who had demoted himself to working in the motor pool after a traumatic battle in the Pendulum Wars.

=== Plot ===
Mere hours before the Hammer strikes, Sgt. Diaz receives orders from Chairman Prescott and Major Sid Redburn (Bruce Thomas) to retrieve classified intel files from the CIC building in Aldair. Diaz and Redburn find the files on a Locust scientist named Ukkon (Jason Spisak), who has been responsible for creating the various creatures the Locust have been using as instruments of war. The HOD destroys Aldair, but Diaz and Redburn survive. However, Ukkon destroys the army base and kills the entirety of Aloha Squad. Prescott orders Diaz to assassinate Ukkon and is granted the rights to do so by any means necessary. In need of soldiers for the fight, Diaz and Redburn set out to rescue one of the mop-up squads, Echo-Five, but discover that Ukkon has been killing the mop-up crews. Alpha manages to recruit a Stranded group, a militia of civilians who survived the Hammer strikes, after rescuing them from a Locust attack. The leader, Doctor Mikayla Dorn (Debra Wilson), a highly qualified civilian engineer, has knowledge of Ukkon's activities and escorts Diaz and Redburn to Claybourne where he is located. Mikayla manages to shoot Ukkon in the face, but he instantly heals himself. Diaz realizes that the COG is keeping secrets and fears it will get them killed.

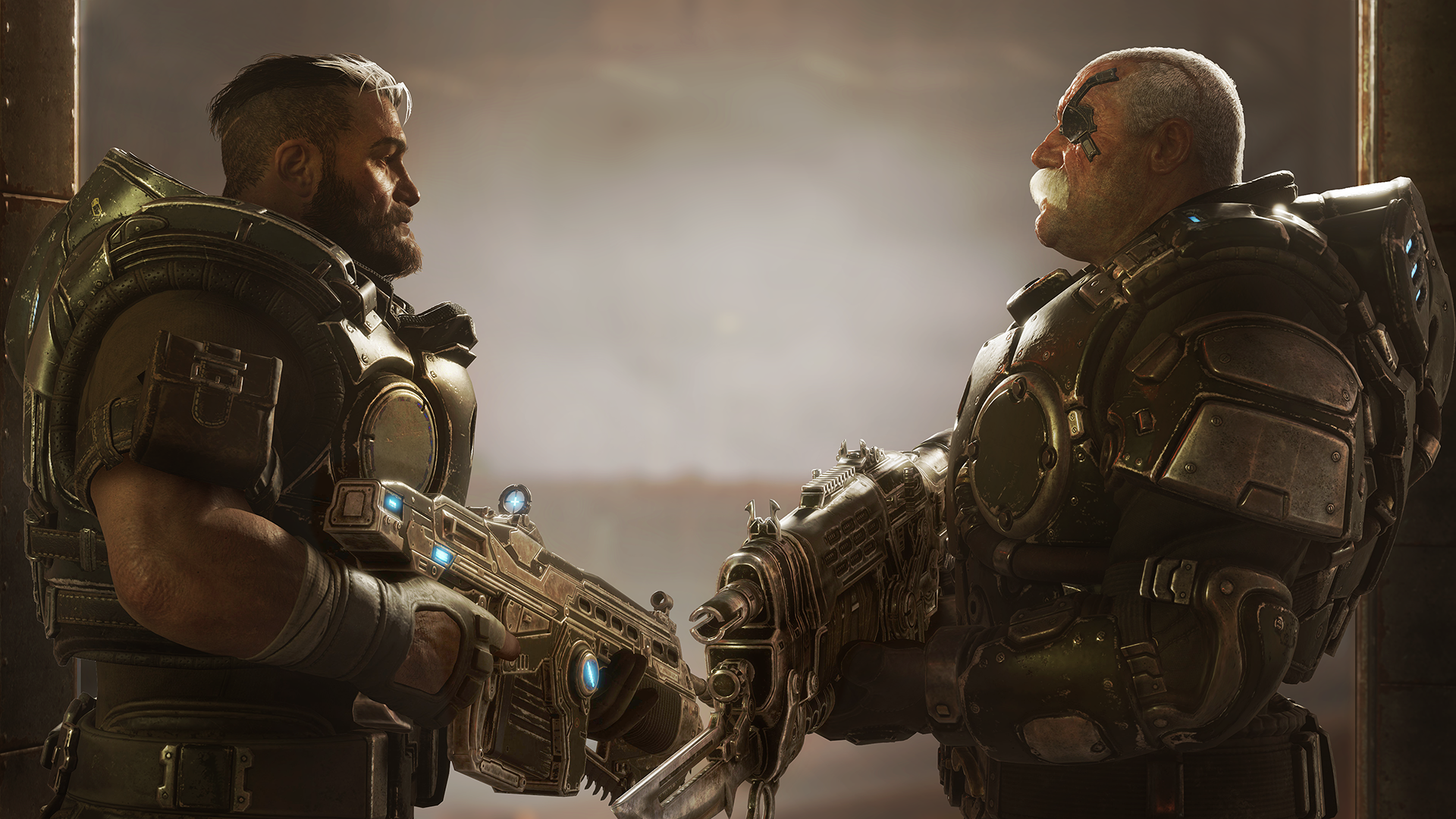
Gabe Diaz and Sid Redburn in an in-game cinematic

Diaz relocates his entire squad into the Vasgari desert to teach them how to fight and prepare for the battle ahead. Alpha discovers an empty canister that Ukkon had used to inhale earlier, belonging to the Nedroma Health Institute - a quarantine zone and research facility for Rustlung, a respiratory condition caused by Imulsion exposure. Upon locating Ukkon's stash, they find the canisters are full of immune system boosters that only work against Rustlung, but with devastating side-effects. Realizing Ukkon is dying of Rustlung and in need of the canisters, Diaz prepares a trap to lure Ukkon by using the canisters as bait. Alpha successfully captures Ukkon, but reveals that he and Redburn have a history. Redburn knocks out Diaz and prepares to drive off with Ukkon back to Ephyra. Mikayla stops him, but Ukkon manages to break free and escape.

Diaz and Mikayla detain Redburn, against the will of Prescott who wants to execute him for treason. Redburn reveals he worked for a genetics lab called the New Hope when he was younger. Like Nedroma, they were trying to cure Rustlung. However, the scientists went mad and used genetic experimentation to evolve the patients into greater beings, but instead created the Locust. Most of the patients lost their minds and went feral, except for Ukkon - who had also developed immortality. When Prescott discovers that Alpha had learned the truth about New Hope, he attempts to kill them with the Hammer of Dawn to cut any loose ends. With Alpha presumed dead and no longer part of the COG, they decide to stick to their mission. Redburn reveals that the New Hope scientists created a fail-safe cytostatic gas that could neutralize Ukkon's healing ability. After they create the cytostatic gas grenade, Alpha proceeds to locate Ukkon's base of operations.

Diaz believes that Ukkon must be based in Zenic Province, which is the only region not to be raided or destroyed. Upon investigating Zenic, Diaz rescues a civilian prisoner named Reyna Torres (Melanie Minichino). She and her father were taking shelter in a nearby lab, but Ukkon arrived and transformed it into his own. For reasons unknown he spared her life while killing her father. She agrees to bring them to Ukkon's lab on the condition that she personally gets to kill him. Diaz agrees and begins a relationship. Reyna guides Alpha to the location of Ukkon's lab and attacks. Mikayla weakens Ukkon using the cytostatic gas grenade and wounds him. Diaz, Redburn, Mikayla and Reyna infiltrate the lab. Ukkon summons all his creations and reinforcements to stop Alpha. They eventually defeat Ukkon's army, and he is killed by Reyna. She retrieves her amulet from Ukkon, which belonged to her mother who she never knew. Unknown to Reyna, her mother is Queen Myrrah of the Locust Horde. Now surviving as Stranded, Alpha decides to dedicate themselves to destroying Ukkon's remaining creations.

== Development ==
The game's development was handled by Splash Damage with The Coalition providing assistance. The Coalition wanted to introduce the franchise to a wider audience and the development team identified that there were a lot of similarities between the franchise, which was a series of squad-based third-person shooters with cover-based combat, and turn-based strategy games. According to Alex Grimbley, the game's executive producer, "[the team] actually just took existing Gears and just moved the camera up". The team took four and a half years to develop the game. The game is not related to Gears of War: Tactics, a cancelled spin-off developed by Epic Games.

The team wanted the game to play at a faster pace when compared to other competing games in the genre. Thus the team decided to give each unit three action points instead of two to ensure that players can get to perform various actions within one turn. The team put a large emphasis on the game's narrative, and the team aimed to tell a "personal and emotional story" and invested a lot of resources into creating the game's cutscenes and employing the voice actors. The team consulted 343 Industries, which worked on Halo Wars, a strategy spin-off of the Halo franchise. However, unlike Halo Wars, the game was considered to be a PC premium title instead of a strategy game designed for console owners.

Publisher Xbox Game Studios announced the game at E3 2018, alongside Gears 5 and Gears Pop!. At The Game Awards 2019, Microsoft announced that the game would be released for Windows on April 28, 2020, while Rod Fergusson, the founder of The Coalition, later confirmed that an Xbox One version is being developed. Players who pre-ordered the game would gain access to the "Thrashball Cole" pack, which allows the player to play as Augustus Cole. The game was also released for Xbox Game Pass subscribers at launch.

With the release of the game on Xbox One and Xbox Series X/S on November 10, the game received additional content with the addition of Jacked Mode which introduces Jack as a playable character, new "Deviant" enemies which are tougher variants of their regular counterparts, more powerful "Supreme" weapon modifications and 11 new achievements worth 400 gamerscore.

== Reception ==
Reception

Aggregate scores
Aggregator	Score
Metacritic	(PC) 80/100 (XSX) 82/100
OpenCritic	85% recommend

Review scores
Publication	Score
Destructoid	9/10
Game Informer	8.5/10
GameSpot	8/10
GamesRadar+	3.5/5
Hardcore Gamer	3.5/5
IGN	8/10
PC Gamer (US)	83/100
PCGamesN	7/10
Shacknews	8/10
The Guardian	4/5
USgamer	4/5

The game received generally positive reviews upon release, according to review aggregator Metacritic. Fellow review aggregator OpenCritic assessed that the game received strong approval, being recommended by 85% of critics.

Destructoid called the game "...a great Gears game and a great tactics game", stating, "The core — getting onto the battlefield and agonizing over every move — is excellent." Game Informer criticized the game's stilted pacing caused by an excess of repetitive and stale side missions, but ultimately concluded that it was "...a solid new front in the Gears theater of war." GameSpot and GamesRadar+ praised the Gears aesthetics, strong character customization, meaningful character progression, and innovative tweaks to the modern RPG formula, while criticizing the filler story and lack of mission diversity. IGN praised the game's graphics and animations, writing, "Character models are fantastically detailed and the ruined, mostly urban environments of the planet Sera are elaborate. Animations are top-notch as well...", criticized the user interface for not providing enough information, and concluded that while the campaign went on to wear out its welcome, it was strong, "...with some clever, Gears-appropriate ideas". PC Gamer criticized the narrative, side missions, and bosses, writing, "Each of the campaign's three acts ends with a setpiece boss battle, which is an exciting thing to have in a tactics game. Unfortunately all three bosses use essentially the same mechanics and they don't change throughout the fights...", while praising the combat, skill system, and top-notch presentation. PCGamesN wrote, "Gears Tactics simply does not have enough variety in its environments, missions, or enemies to keep the campaign feeling fresh...It's a shame, because given a little more ambition and variety, Gears Tactics would be something truly special."

It was nominated for the category of Best Sim/Strategy game at The Game Awards 2020.
