= Gears of War =

Third-person shooter video game series

- Genre: Third-person shooter
- Developers: Epic Games (2006–2013); People Can Fly (2013– present); The Coalition (2015–present); Splash Damage (2020); Mediatonic; (2019)
- Publisher: Xbox Game Studios
- Creator: Cliff Bleszinski
- Platforms: Xbox 360; Microsoft Windows; Xbox One; iOS; Xbox Series X/S; PlayStation 5
- First release: Gears of War; November 7, 2006
- Latest release: Gears of War: E-Day; October 6, 2026
- Spin-offs: Gears of War: Judgment; Gears Pop!; Gears Tactics

Gears of War (also referred to as Gears) is a media franchise centered on a series of video games created by Epic Games, developed and managed by The Coalition, and owned and published by Xbox Game Studios. The franchise is best known for its third-person shooter video games, which has been supplemented by spin-off video game titles, a DC comic book series, eight novels, a board game adaptation and various merchandise.

The original trilogy focuses on the conflict between humanity and the subterranean reptilian humanoid known as the Locust Horde on the world of Sera. The first installment, Gears of War, was released on November 7, 2006, for the Xbox 360. The game follows protagonist Marcus Fenix, a soldier in the Coalition of Ordered Governments tasked to lead a last-ditch effort to destroy the Locust Horde and save humanity. Two subsequent titles, Gears of War 2 (2008) and Gears of War 3 (2011), featured a three-way conflict between humanity, the Locust Horde and their mutated counterparts, the Lambent. Gears of War: Judgment, a spin-off prequel to the series' first title, was released in 2013; it focuses on Damon Baird, one of Fenix's squad-mates. Gears of War: Ultimate Edition was released for the Xbox One and Microsoft Windows between August 2015 to March 2016. The fourth installment in the main series, Gears of War 4, is set 25 years after Gears of War 3 and follows Marcus Fenix's son, JD and his friends as they battle security forces deployed by a totalitarian COG government as well as the Swarm, a reconstituted version of the Locust Horde that once again threatens humanity. Gears 5 (2019) is the direct sequel to Gears of War 4 and revolves around Kait Diaz, a friend of JD, who embarks on an adventure to learn the truth about her past and the connections between her history and the Locust Horde.

Gears of War was developed by Epic Games. Cliff Bleszinski, who has previously worked on Epic's Unreal Tournament games, served as the series' lead game designer for the first three installments. He was inspired by gameplay elements from Resident Evil 4, Kill Switch, and Bionic Commando. The series was guided by Rod Fergusson, the executive producer and director of development of Epic Games until 2012. The first four installments of the Gears of War series used a modified version of the Unreal Engine 3 engine. In January 2014, Microsoft acquired rights to the franchise from Epic Games. Canadian studio The Coalition developed Gears of War 4, which was released on October 11, 2016, for the Xbox One and Windows 10. A sequel, Gears 5, was released in September 2019. All six installments in Gears of War featured several multiplayer modes that allowed players to compete against each other or team-up to battle AI opponents on Xbox Live.

Gears of War became one of the best-selling franchises for the Xbox 360. The series puts emphasis on cover-based combat, in which players can use objects to avoid gunfire or safely engage enemies. The Gears of War games have been amongst the most popular and most played titles on Xbox Live.

== Story ==
=== Premise and setting ===
The Gears of War series takes place on Sera, a fictional Earth-like planet. Human civilization develops and endures a millennia-long conflict that leaves humanity on the brink of extinction. Sera's leaders broker an era of peace that ushers scientific advancements and a cultural renaissance. Humanity's population booms and demands more energy than fossil fuel, nuclear power, and renewable energy can provide. Sera's scientists then discover Imulsion, a naturally occurring liquid substance found in the underground caverns called "the Hollow", can be refined into a potent energy source. Imulsion solves the planet's energy crisis, but ultimately creates great economic disparity between nations with direct access to Imulsion and those nations without, leading them into financial turmoil. Direct exposure to Imulson also causes the onset of a chronic respiratory condition in humans known as Rustlung.

Sera's citizens are divided into two main warring factions: the Coalition of Ordered Governments (COG), and the Union of Independent Republics (UIR). The ensuing 79-year strife, known as the Pendulum Wars, consumes millions of lives with both sides, locked in a virtual stalemate. The UIR develops the "Hammer of Dawn" (HoD), a system of satellites capable of delivering precise and destructive orbital-to-surface laser strikes. A contingent of COG commandos, led by Marcus Fenix, Dominic Santiago, and Victor Hoffman launch a daring raid on a UIR stronghold in Aspho Fields to steal the schematics for the HoD. The UIR surrenders after witnessing the HoD (completed by Marcus Fenix's father, Professor Adam Fenix) devastate one of their naval vessels.

Six weeks after the COG and UIR agreed to an armistice, a race of subterranean creatures, known as the Locust Horde, emerge from Sera's depths and begin assaulting human cities. Wiping out 25% of the world population in the first 26 hours, this initial attack is referred to as "Emergence Day" or "E-Day". The Locust overwhelm the already battle-worn COG forces during this surprise attack, causing them to retreat to the Jacinto Plateau, an area of granite bedrock the Locust cannot dig through, and reluctantly bombard their own cities with the HoD to halt the Horde's advance. The ensuing scorched earth tactic destroys much of Sera's cities and human population. The COG continues to operate out of the COG capital in Ephyra, and other cities on the plateau, such as Jacinto. The surviving humans outside the plateau and COG jurisdiction, known as Stranded, are left to wander through Sera's charred ruins.

The Locust reemerge and begin a campaign of occupying human cities on the Jacinto Plateau to act as stepping stones. The Locust are eventually able to emerge and overrun Ephyra 10 years after Emergence Day. During the chaos, Marcus Fenix leads an unauthorized rescue mission to save his father from the Locust assault. During the evacuation, a helicopter is shot down by the Locust and crashes into the Fenix Estate, presumably killing Adam. The COG's leadership court martials Marcus and sentences him to 40 years in prison. After losing Ephyra, the remainder of the COG retreats to Jacinto City.

=== Gears of War ===
Gears of War is set 14 years after the Locust emerged, and four years into Marcus Fenix's imprisonment. The COG forces devise a last-ditch offensive to destroy the Locust by detonating the Lightmass Bomb in their tunnels. Marcus is reinstated into the COG army to supplement their depleted ranks and joins Dominic Santiago in Delta Squad on a mission to map the Locust tunnel network in preparation for the bombing. Their unit is ambushed by Locust forces and sustain heavy casualties. Fenix is repromoted to Sergeant and leads Delta with two other soldiers, Augustus Cole and Damon Baird. While the Sonic Resonator fails to map the tunnels, Delta uncovers mapping data already created by Adam Fenix. Marcus retrieves the tunnel data from his father's lab, who had been studying the Locust, and successfully deploys the Lightmass Bomb. Many of the Locust are killed. The Locust Queen, Myrrah, pledges to continue the war effort.

=== Gears of War 2 ===
Gears of War 2 is set six months after the Lightmass Offensive. In the immediate aftermath following the Lightmass Offensive, the human population begins to suffer from Rustlung, caused by the inhalation of Imulsion evaporated by the bombings. The Locust reemerge and bring with them a force that can sink entire cities on the Jacinto Plateau. After the destruction of Tollen and Montevado, the COG fears the Locust are trying to destroy Jacinto. Threatened with extinction, COG leader Chairman Richard Prescott devises Operation: Hollow Storm, in which thousands of soldiers will be deployed into the Hollow, locate the Locust stronghold, and eliminate them once and for all. COG soldiers, including Delta, are deployed into the Hollow and battle the Locust to stop their plans of sinking Jacinto. The COG discovers the Locust have been using a gargantuan worm to sink the cities. After killing the Riftworm, Delta is ordered to locate the Locust stronghold by accessing intel from New Hope, a decommissioned COG research facility. The lab contains genetically altered humans called Sires, experiments on children ill with Rustlung that led to the creation of the Locust. Files there reveal the New Hope scientists fled to Mount Kadar to continue their work in solitude after the COG shut them down. The COG attacks Mount Kadar, where the Locust established their capital of Nexus. As the COG invades Nexus, they learn the Locust are mutating into the "Lambent", organisms infected with Imulsion. They have been forcing the Locust out of the Hollow for the surface world. Acting on advice from Adam Fenix, Queen Myrrah intends to sink Jacinto and use the surrounding seawater to flood the Hollow, drowning the Lambent and denying the humans their last safe city. The COG intentionally sinks Jacinto before the Locust can evacuate, drowning them in their tunnels and destroying their civilization. Adam Fenix is revealed to be alive through a radio transmission.

The remaining human population rediscover an island unscathed by the Locust War called Vectes. The Stranded gangs on the island threaten the safety of the COG, but the two groups ceasefire when the Lambent begin to emerge and overrun the island. Due to the Hollow being flooded, the Imulsion has begun to pollute the surface - causing a pandemic that aims to turn all life into Lambent organisms. Chairman Prescott is believed to be hiding secrets from the population about the origins of the Locust and Lambent, and loses their trust. Prescott abandons the COG, forcing them to disband and live as nomads, surviving against the Lambent and Locust stragglers on their own.

=== Gears of War 3 ===
Gears of War 3 is set 18 months after Jacinto's sinking. Prescott returns to the COG and reveals to Marcus that Adam Fenix is alive. After the helicopter crash, Adam was rescued and brought to a secret island facility called Azura where he has been working the past seven years on the Imulsion countermeasure, a targeted radiation weapon which will neutralize both the Lambent and Locust. The island was sieged by Queen Myrrah's remaining forces. It is revealed that Adam knew of the Locust before E-Day and worked with Myrrah to solve the Lambent problem so the Locust wouldn't invade the surface, but was unable to provide a solution for them in time. Delta manages to locate Azura, liberate Adam, and release his countermeasure. Adam is killed by the radiation wave as he was exposed to Imulsion while developing the weapon. The countermeasure vaporizes all Lambent organisms, including Adam. The Locust are instead crystallized in an impenetrable shell. Marcus kills Queen Myrrah and humanity is able to start rebuilding.

Gears of War: RAAM's Shadow is set nine years after E-Day, shortly before the Locust invade Ephyra. High General RAAM leads a siege against Ilima City to use as a stepping stone in reaching Ephyra. Zeta Squad is ordered to locate and rescue civilians for evacuation before RAAM's forces occupy the city. The occupation of Ilima is successful and leads to the Locust taking Ephyra.

=== Gears of War: Judgement ===
Gears of War: Judgment focuses on Baird and Cole during the early months of the Locust War. With military cadet Sofia Hendrick and former UIR soldier Garron Paduk in Kilo Squad, they disobey orders and deploy the Lightmass Missile to the destroy Locust forces occupying Halvo Bay. The squad is court-martialed, but Kilo is acquitted due to their actions resulting in victory. A separate campaign, Aftermath, features Baird, Cole, and Paduk in the hours before the activation of the Imulsion countermeasure in Gears of War 3 as they prepare for reinforcements in the upcoming battle of Azura.

=== Gears Tactics ===
Gears Tactics takes place a year after E-Day. Sgt. Gabriel Diaz, Kait's father and Oscar's brother, and Major Sid Redburn are tasked with assassinating Locust scientist, Ukkon, who is physically immortal by regenerating any damage done to him. Redburn reveals he was a guard at New Hope and was responsible for creating the Locust and Ukkon. Redburn is able to replicate the chemical New Hope used to counteract Ukkon's healing as a fail-safe. Diaz liberates a Locust prison camp and rescues Reyna, Kait's mother, from Ukkon's capture. Using the chemical, Reyna kills Ukkon. Diaz and Redburn abandon the COG after Prescott tries to kill them for learning about New Hope. Reyna joins them in their hunt of Ukkon's creations.

=== Gears of War: E-Day ===
Gears of War: E-Day is a prequel which takes place fourteen years before the first game on Emergence Day, the day on which the Locust Horde emerged on the surface of Sera to wage war against humanity, and follows Marcus Fenix and Dominic Santiago as young men.

=== Post-Locust War ===
Following the end of the Locust War, the humans of Sera reform the COG, led by First Minister Anya Stroud, wife of Marcus Fenix. With the assistance of robotic DeeBees created by Baird, the COG builds New Ephyra and other walled cities known as Settlements. Anya gives birth to Marcus' son, James Dominic "JD" Fenix. Anya dies from complications during pregnancy, and the COG becomes more authoritarian under First Minister Mina Jinn - prompting many civilians to abandon the COG and live off the land, known as Outsiders. After joining the military, both JD and Delmont "Del" Walker are forced to execute civilians during a protest in Settlement 2, prompting them to leave the COG and becoming Outsiders. They join the village of Fort Umson, led by Reyna Diaz and her brother-in-law, Oscar. Reyna's daughter, Kait, becomes close with JD and Del.

=== Gears of War 4 ===
Gears of War 4 takes place 25 years after human victory. Fort Umson is ambushed by creatures called the Swarm. Reyna and the other villagers are captured. With JD, Kait, and Del left - they recruit Marcus to save their people. The COG pursues the group after erroneously believing they are behind a string of kidnappings. The four reach a Locust burial site where they learn the Imulsion countermeasure caused the Locust to evolve into the Swarm and have been capturing humans to transform them into soldiers for their new army. The group receives assistance from Baird and Cole as they battle their way to the Swarm's hive, but discover Reyna has been forcefully integrated in their network. Kait separates and euthanizes her mother upon her request. Kait is given the necklace that belonged to Reyna's mother, which bears the symbol of the Locust Horde.

=== Gears 5 ===
Gears 5 reveals that JD, Del, and Marcus rejoin the COG, along with Kait as an Outsider recruit, in order to help fight the Swarm. After Reyna's death, Kait begins to have nightmares and visions related to the Swarm, caused by Queen Myrrah, whose consciousness is still intact and connected to Kait's mind. Kait refuses to tell the others about her connection to the Locust out of fear. Marcus and Baird believe the Hammer of Dawn will be needed back online to defend against the upcoming war with the Swarm. Delta return to Azura after Baird uncovers intel on additional Hammer of Dawn satellites at Azura. Kait is captured by the Swarm and is connected to the hivemind, in which she inadvertently controls the Swarm army, resulting in her Uncle Oscar's death. After being rescued, Kait reveals her visions and believes them to be messages from the Locust, as evidenced by her grandmother's necklace. Marcus has Kait find answers at the New Hope facility and a secret lab in Mount Kadar where the scientists fled. Kait learns the Locust were the result of genetic experiments on human children sick with Rustlung and mutated with the DNA of creatures from the Hollow. The Sires were used to fertilize the stem cells of Myrrah, who was genetically immune to Imulsion. Kait disconnects herself from the hivemind, forcing Myrrah to possess Reyna's reanimated body. The Swarm, becoming stronger with the return of their queen, launches an attack against New Ephyra. Using the Hammer of Dawn, the COG repels the Swarm attack. Kait vows to kill Queen Reyna before she can attack again.

Gears 5: Hivebusters follows Jeremiah Keegan, Lahni Kaliso, and Leslie Macallister shortly after the Battle of New Ephyra. Victor Hoffman, and Cole's daughter, Hana, have devised a potential solution for ending the Swarm by having soldiers infiltrate their hives and planting venom bombs to take down all the Swarm connected. They are successful in infiltrating and destroying the Swarm hive. Although it fails to kill all the Swarm, it's an advantage the COG has in the war against them.

== Gameplay ==
Marcus Fenix, the player-controlled character, takes aim at a Locust Drone with a Lancer from behind cover. The game uses an over-the-shoulder camera angle when displaying the targeting reticle.

Gears of War is a third-person shooter game, with its core concepts being derived from Resident Evil 4's "over the shoulder" perspective, Kill Switch's cover system, and Bionic Commando's swinging action akin to moving between points of cover. The series focuses on using cover to tactically engage the enemy in battle to avoid taking damage. While behind cover, the player can fire blindly and inaccurately at their opponent, or can look around the cover and aim carefully, though exposing to enemy fire; the player can slide along cover, move between nearby cover, or vault over cover to race to a new point of cover. As the player takes damage, the "Crimson Omen" appears on the HUD, becoming more defined as the player nears low health levels. The player can regenerate their health by staying out of harm's way for a short while. Should the player take too much damage, they will become incapacitated unless revived by a teammate; depending on game mode, the player may be able to recover from this state on their own, or may die after a short amount of time if not revived. When a combatant is down, a member of the other side may attempt to execute the downed player via a "curb stomp" or other brutal methods. Some types of damage will immediately kill the player with no chance of revival, such as explosive damage. There are five levels on the first two games; they are referred to as "acts" and each act is formed into a certain number of chapters.

Players in Gears of War can carry four different weapons, with the exception of the Judgment, allowing two primary weapon slots that can carry weapons which include, but are not limited to: assault rifles, shotguns, a sniper rifle, grenade launchers and an explosive bow; one grenade slot, which may be filled with up to four grenades of a specific type (Fragmentation, Smoke, Ink and Incendiary), and one pistol-type weapon. Players can either obtain ammo or swap out their current weapons with any weapon dropped by a downed foe or from those scattered around the various maps. Most weapons feature the "Active Reload" ability: either after a weapon has depleted an ammo magazine or when the player starts a manual reload, a meter is shown on screen, and the player can attempt to stop the meter in a certain marked area. If the player stops the meter in the marked area, their reload will be completed faster than if they did not attempt an Active Reload, and if the player can stop the meter at a specific section of the marked area, they will gain a temporary slight damage boost with each reloaded shot and a faster reload. If the player stops the meter outside this area, their gun will become temporarily jammed and slow down the reload time. While most of the weapons are based on standard shooter archetypes, Gears of War's signature weapon is the Lancer Assault Rifle, which has a mounted chainsaw bayonet that can be used in close quarter combat to instantly kill a standard foe. Another notable weapon is the Gnasher Shotgun, which is one of the most-used weapons in multiplayer modes for the series, as well as its most divisive. While it is inefficient at long distances, it is a popular weapon of choice at close-quarters as it is small and easy to aim, making it exceptionally useful for close-range combat. The Gnasher Shotgun, like many other weapons, can be used to bash opponents in melee, or in the case of grenades, can be stuck to a foe, exploding a few seconds later. In Gears of War 2 and Gears of War 3, all four types of grenades can be planted on any reachable surface, detonating when an opponent comes close to it. If the opponent spots the grenade, they can detonate it from a safe distance by shooting it.

All Gears of War games feature a campaign mode that can be played cooperatively with one other player. The two players take the roles of two COG soldiers, Marcus Fenix and Dominic "Dom" Santiago, as they fight the Locust. In the third game the campaign allows for up to four players to play together at the same time. The campaign mode features several levels of difficulty. At various times, the campaign will offer a choice of paths the first player can select; if the second player is present, they will be forced to take the other path. The third and fourth players in Gears of War 3 will be separated between the paths of the first and second players. In these areas, all players generally have to work together to get them through the section, such as by one player providing covering fire while the second player opens a switch that allows the first player to proceed.

The competitive multiplayer mode in Gears of War features 8 players while in Gears of War 2 features up to ten players split between COG and Locust forces in a number of gameplay types. Modes include "Warzone" and "Execution", both similar to a typical deathmatch, and "Annex" and "King of the Hill" where teams have to control a marked zone on the map. In the mode "Guardian" (only in Gears of War 2) one member of each team is designated as the leader. As long as the leader is still alive, their teammates can respawn indefinitely. As soon as the leader is executed, their teammates can no longer respawn.

== Games ==
Release timeline
2006	Gears of War
2007
2008	Gears of War 2
2009
2010
2011	Gears of War 3
2011	RAAM'S Shadow
2012
2013	Gears of War: Judgment
2014
2015	Gears of War: Ultimate Edition
2016	Gears of War 4
2017
2018
2019	Gears Pop!
2019	Gears 5
2020	Gears Tactics
2020	Gears 5: Hivebusters
2021
2022
2023
2024
2025	Gears of War: Reloaded
2026	Gears of War: E-Day

Year	Title	Platform
Mainline titles
2006	Gears of War	Xbox 360, Windows
2008	Gears of War 2	Xbox 360
2011	Gears of War 3	Xbox 360
2016	Gears of War 4	Windows, Xbox One
2019	Gears 5	Windows, Xbox One, Xbox Series X/S
2026	Gears of War: E-Day	Windows, Xbox Series X/S
Spin-off titles
2013	Gears of War: Judgment	Xbox 360
2019	Gears Pop!	Windows, iOS, Android
2020	Gears Tactics	Windows, Xbox One, Xbox Series X/S
Remasters
2015	Gears of War: Ultimate Edition	Xbox One, Windows
2025	Gears of War: Reloaded	Windows, Xbox Series X/S, PlayStation 5
Story Expansions
2011	RAAM's Shadow	Xbox 360
2020	Hivebusters	Windows, Xbox One, Xbox Series X/S

=== Main series ===
Gears of War main chronology
- 4 Prologue (2 years B.E.) (Note: B.E. means Before Emergence) (Note: The first section of the prologue takes place during the Pendulum Wars, the second section takes place on E-Day and the third section runs concurrently with the ending of Gears of War 3)
- E-Day (Emergence Day)
- Judgment (Six weeks A.E.) (Note: A.E. means After Emergence)
- Tactics (One year A.E.)
- RAAM’s Shadow (9 Years A.E.)
- Gears of War (14 years A.E.)
- 2 (15 years A.E.)
- 3 (17 years A.E.)
- Aftermath (17 years A.E.) (Note: Run's concurrently with Gears of War 3, specifically at the same time as Act 3)
- 4 (42 years A.E.)
- 5 (43 years A.E.)
- Hivebusters (43 years A.E.) (Note: Run's concurrently with Gears 5, specifically at the same time as Act 3 and 4)

==== Gears of War ====
Gears of War is a third-person shooter video game developed by Epic Games and published by Microsoft Studios. It was initially released for the Xbox 360 on November 7, 2006, in North America, and on November 17 in Europe. It was released for Microsoft Windows on June 11, 2007. Gears of War follows Delta Squad's efforts to help deploy a Lightmass bomb deep in the Locust tunnels to wipe out the Locust threat.

A remastered edition of the game titled Gears of War: Ultimate Edition was developed and released for the Xbox One and Microsoft Windows by The Coalition, after Microsoft acquired the rights to the Gears of War franchise from Epic Games in 2014. A second remaster, Gears of War: Reloaded, developed by The Coalition in collaboration with Sumo Digital and Disbelief released on Xbox Series X/S, Microsoft Windows, and PlayStation 5 in 2025.

==== Gears of War 2 ====
Gears of War 2 is a third-person shooter video game published by Microsoft Studios. It is the sequel to Gears of War and was released worldwide on November 7, 2008. The game uses a heavily upgraded version of the Unreal Engine 3. Gears of War 2 takes place 6 months after the first game, where the Locust are attempting to sink Jacinto Plateau, and the COG forces have decided to launch a counter-offensive to stop them before they can complete their attempt. Ultimately the COG sinks Jacinto themselves to flood the home of the Locust (the Hollow) and drown them.

A PC version of the game was originally planned before being cancelled by the developers, citing poor sales of the original PC version of Gears of War as well as concerns over piracy.

==== Road To Ruin ====
Road to Ruin was a downloadable bonus campaign chapter for Gears of War 2 which featured Marcus and Dom disguising themselves as Locust drones to sneak into the Hollow. Road to Ruin was initially cut from the main game before being bundled inside the "Dark Corners" map pack. In 2018 all DLC's for Gears of War 2 were made free of charge, meaning everyone could play the additional chapter.

==== Gears of War 3 ====
Gears of War 3 is the concluding part to the trilogy. Originally with an April 6, 2011, release date, it was moved to September 20 to anchor Microsoft Studios' holiday portfolio for the Xbox 360.

Gears of War 3 takes place 18 months after the end of Gears of War 2. Marcus, Dom, and the last remnants of humanity must band together to survive against the Locust and Lambent, while trying to find Marcus's father and end the war. In the end, a weapon developed by Marcus' father Adam Fenix is detonated, wiping out the Locust and the Lambent, as well as ending the war.

===== RAAM's Shadow =====
RAAM's Shadow is a secondary campaign for Gears of War 3 introduced as a DLC. Taking place several years before the original Gears of War game, RAAM's Shadow follows Zeta-Six during the Evacuation of Ilima, a city that appeared in ruins in Gears of War 2 as well as taking place from the perspective of Locust General RAAM. Zeta-Six is made up of Lieutenant Minh Young Kim from Gears of War, Tai Kaliso from Gears of War 2, Michael Barrick from the comic book series and Alicia Valera. Supporting character Jace Stratton previously appeared as a member of Delta Squad in Gears of War 3.

==== Gears of War 4 ====
Gears of War 4 is an Xbox One and Windows 10 game developed by The Coalition and released on October 11, 2016.

The game's plot is set 25 years after Gears of War 3 and focuses on JD Fenix, the son of Marcus Fenix, who joins his father and two new characters: Delmont "Del" Walker and Kait Diaz against the "Swarm", a new threat risen from the remnants of the Locust.

==== Gears 5 ====
Gears 5 is a sequel to Gears of War 4. It was released for Windows and Xbox One on September 10, 2019. The game focusing on Kait Diaz, as she looks for the means to counter the Swarm, learning about the true origin of the Locust and their connection with her family.

===== Hivebusters =====
Hivebusters is a single-player downloadable content expansion pack for Gears 5. Taking place before the events of the Gears of War: Hivebusters comic book series, Hivebusters follows Team Scorpio — Corporal Jeremiah Keegan, Lieutenant Lahni Kaliso and Outsider Leslie "Mac" Macallister — as they investigate a method to infiltrate and destroy the Swarm's hives from within as seen in the "Escape" multiplayer mode of Gears 5.

==== Gears of War: E-Day ====
Gears of War: E-Day is a prequel set 14 years before the events of Gears of War, following Marcus and Dom during the first days of the Locust War. The game was officially announced on June 9, 2024, during the Xbox Games Showcase by Microsoft Gaming at the Summer Game Fest.

=== Spin-offs ===
==== Gears of War: Judgment ====
Gears of War: Judgment is a spin-off/prequel, released on March 19, 2013. The characters include Baird, accompanied by Augustus "Cole Train" Cole and two new characters, Garron Paduk and Sofia Hendrik, who make up Kilo Squad. Kilo Squad is put on trial by another new character, Ezra Loomis. The game is set 6 weeks after emergence day.

==== Judgment Aftermath ====
Aftermath was an unlockable bonus chapter for Judgment. Aftermath is set during the events of Gears of War 3 in which Baird and Cole are split from Marcus and Dom to gather reinforcements for the assault on Azura. Baird, Cole and Carmine return to Halvo Bay where they are reunited with Garron Paduk and learn what happened to Sofia Hendrik. Aftermath was unlocked for free via obtaining a minimum of 40 stars across the main campaign.

==== Gears Pop! ====
Gears Pop! was a spin-off for mobile devices based on Funko's POP! toyline and released on August 22, 2019. However, the game was eventually discontinued on April 26, 2021.

==== Gears Tactics ====
Gears Tactics is a turn-based strategy spin-off for Xbox One and Windows, developed by Splash Damage and released on April 28, 2020. Set before the events of the first game, it follows a military unit led by Sgt. Gabriel Diaz, who would later become Kait's father.

=== Other games ===
Characters from the Gears of War series have made guest appearances in games outside of the Gears of War franchise. Marcus Fenix and Dominic Santiago are playable in the Xbox 360 version of Lost Planet 2. General RAAM was announced as a playable character in Killer Instinct: Season Three during Microsoft's E3 2016 press conference on June 13, 2016, and was released following the presentation's conclusion.

=== Backwards compatibility ===
Microsoft revealed on August 3, 2015, that the four Gears of War titles that launched on Xbox 360 — Gears of War, Gears of War 2, Gears of War 3, and Gears of War: Judgment — are compatible on Xbox One through the backwards compatibility program. In 2021, all aforementioned games got 60 FPS support on Xbox Series X and Series S as part of the Xbox FPS Boost program.

== Music ==
The video game music for Gears of War was composed by Kevin Riepl, who had previously worked with Epic Games on soundtracks for Unreal Tournament 2003, Unreal Tournament 2004 and Unreal Championship 2. The music for Gears of War 2 and Gears of War 3 was composed by Steve Jablonsky. The music for Gears of War 4 is composed by Ramin Djawadi. Ramin Djawadi continued to compose the music for the next title in the series, Gears 5.

== Adaptations ==
=== The Board Game ===
Gears of War: The Board Game was released in 2011 by Fantasy Flight Games. Designed by Corey Konieczka, it is a cooperative game for up to four players, including the option for solo play. Each player takes control of a COG (represented by a miniature figure pre-painted in red), fighting their way through randomly generated maps filled with Locust soldiers (represented by a miniature figure pre-painted in light gray). These are controlled by an AI deck of cards: after each player finishes their turn, they draw a card from the AI deck and takes actions for each Locust creature. Players play cards and roll dice to take actions as well as to resolve shooting and defense. The game proceeds until the player team successfully completes the mission. There are seven different missions, each featuring different objectives and enemies in randomly generated map layouts. Since its launch, the game has received one expansion, Mission Pack 1, which brought more weapons, two new missions and new enemies, including General RAAM.

=== Books ===
A series of novels based on the Gears of War series were written by Karen Traviss. The books expand on the games and detail events which occur in between installments. Gears of War: Aspho Fields was the first in an expected trilogy, although the total numbers of books has since grown to seven. Once the video game franchise was extended, author Jason M. Hough was promoted as the author for more tie-in novels set in the world.

- Gears of War: Aspho Fields (2008), by Karen Traviss, tells the story of Aspho Fields, a battle that changed the course of the Pendulum Wars, while bridging the gap between the first and second game in the present day. It also fills in some history of the relationship between Marcus Fenix and Dominic Santiago, as well as Dom's brother, Carlos.
- Gears of War: Jacinto's Remnant (2009), by Karen Traviss, continues where Gears of War 2 ends, as the survivors of Jacinto search for a new life while fending off attacks from the last of the Locust. With the Horde all but defeated, humanity may yet again become its own worst enemy. It also details the events one year after E-Day, when the new chairman authorized the use of the Hammer of Dawn.
- Gears of War: Anvil Gate (2010), by Karin Traviss, takes place between the second and the third game. With the Locust apparently defeated, humans have once more succumbed to infighting. But when the Lambent—the monsters that even the Horde feared—appear, the humans must remember the tactics of an old battle if they hope to survive this war.
- Gears of War: Coalition's End (2011), by Karin Traviss, finds humanity on the brink of extinction, pushed back to the remote island of Vectes. There both Gears and refugees have banded together to survive a threat even greater than the Locust—the Lambent. It takes place approximately eighteen months after the events of Gears of War 2 and leads directly into the events of Gears of War 3.
- Gears of War: The Slab (2012), by Karin Traviss, details the events of Marcus's imprisonment in the Slab, following his desertion in the middle of battle to attempt to save his father's life. The novel focuses on the backstories of Marcus and Adam Fenix, and also Victor Hoffman and takes place prior to the events of Gears of War.
- Gears of War: Ascendance (2019), by Jason M. Hough, bridges the gap between Gears of War 4 and Gears 5.
- Gears of War: Bloodlines (2020), by Jason M. Hough, takes place within the four month time skip in Gears 5. It also features a flashback storyline featuring Lieutenant Colonel Gabriel Diaz, Kait Diaz's father, during the Pendulum Wars. The book's ending also hints at the events of Gears Tactics with Gabriel's demotion to Sergeant and motor pool and a mention by Colonel Victor Hoffman of Ukkon, the primary antagonist of Gears Tactics.
- Gears of War: Ephyra Rising (2021), by Michael A. Stackpole, reveals the canonical, never-before-seen events set in the time immediately following Gears of War 3.

=== Comic-book series ===
"Gears of War: Hollow" was the first comic book series based on the Gears of War games, released in December 2008. The series was published under DC's Wildstorm imprint and was written by Joshua Ortega, with art by Liam Sharp. The story arc followed Jace Stratton, a young recruit of Delta Squad who made an appearance in Gears of War 3 and Michael Barrick, a solo Gear found by Delta. The arc was 6 issues long and ended in May 2009. Two stand-alone comic book series were released. Issue 7, "The Quickening", followed the life of Tai Kaliso from his home in the South Islands to the torture den of the Locust Horde. This was released on June 9, 2009.

The second stand-alone was "Harper's Story". In Gears of War 2 there are collectibles which describe the end of Sgt. Jonathan Harper, a Gears veteran. He was captured by the Locust during the events of the Hollow. He managed to survive the vile deeds of the Locust Horde and escape. He helped a family reach safety, taking the bullets into his own body before falling to the ground.

Issue number 9 begins a new arc, "Barren", of which the first part was released in September 2009. The "other side" of the life of humans faced by total annihilation are shown. Birthing creches, or breeding farms, filled with women who are there to just to give birth. With humanity dying out and no people to replace fallen Gears, new humans are needed. The story focuses on an escapee from one of these centers named Alex Brand. Declared to be barren at the age of 18, Brand was kicked from the breeding farm she was born in, sent to Boot Camp and trained to be a Gear. She accompanies Delta and Sigma Squads as they investigate a mysterious beacon call from the place at which she was born, which was thought to have been destroyed by Locust.

==== Gears of War: The Rise of RAAM ====
Gears of War: The Rise of RAAM is a comic book series acting as a prequel to the Gears of War series and taking place from the point of view of iconic Gears of War villain General RAAM. The supporting characters included Locust Queen Myrrah, Skorge from Gears of War 2 and Karn from Gears of War: Judgment while the comics introduced Locust High General Sraak, High Priest Vrol and the Locust scientist Ukkon who would subsequently appear as the main antagonist of Gears Tactics.

Taking place years before Emergence Day, the Locust are in a losing war with Lambent in their home which was the Hollow. RAAM who was a Lieutenant in the Locust army urges the Horde's leadership to invade the surface, exterminate humanity and claim the surface world for themselves. Despite RAAM having Skorge's backing, High General Sraak refuses to hear them out even with evidence that the war with the Lambent is lost. Sraak subsequently attempts to assassinate RAAM with the help of Ukkon using a Corpser, but he fails. As he was unaware that the Locust council is listening in, RAAM decides to include High Priest Vrol and Karn in his plot to convince Queen Myrrah to invade the surface. RAAM manages to get Karn to help by playing on his doubts and they purposefully allowed the Lambent to reach the Inner Hollow where they attacked the Locust temple. RAAM swoops in within time to save the temple, convincing Vrol to help him.

With the backing of Skorge, Vrol and Karn, RAAM presents his case to the council, shocking Myrrah that his reports are so different from Sraak's. RAAM presents his plan to win the war by invading the surface, taking it over and flooding the Hollow with seawater in order to wipe the Lambent out once they are gone. Myrrah agrees and she promotes RAAM to her new High General while demoting the humiliated Sraak to RAAM's old rank of Lieutenant. Myrrah privately revealed her alliance with Adam Fenix to find a solution to the Lambent and how Adam failed to deliver forcing her to invade the surface. Myrrah has also been aware about RAAM's coup from the beginning and while she agreed with his plan, she was waiting for RAAM to act. She also threatens RAAM's life should he ever attempt to dethrone her. RAAM promotes Karn and he instructs him to lead the destruction of the country of Gorasnaya. Ukkon also agrees to help RAAM in exchange for human prisoners to use as his test subjects.

On Emergence Day, RAAM personally leads the attack on the human city of Jannermount. Skorge warns RAAM that according to his visions, RAAM will not survive the war. However, RAAM is unbothered by the news as he intends Skorge to take over if he should fall. A crazed Sraak attacks the two, intending to kill RAAM and Skorge and regain his power. However, RAAM anticipated Sraak's actions and he has two Theron Guards shoot Sraak, destroying the chest piece of his formidable armor. RAAM executes Sraak by ripping his heart out and he continues leading humanity's extermination.

==== Gears of War: Hivebusters ====
Gears of War: Hivebusters is a comic book series that came out in 2019. The comic focuses on Team Scorpio—Corporal Jeremiah Keegan, Lieutenant Lahni Kaliso and Outsider Leslie "Mac" Macallister—as they work with Colonel Victor Hoffman, Doctor Hana Cole and King Raven pilot Tak to destroy Swarm Hives across Sera. The Gears 5 DLC Hivebusters released in December 2020 acts as a direct prequel to the comic book series.

Having been captured and taken into the heart of the Swarm Hive on the South Island of Pahanu, Scorpio is awakened in their pods by the adrenaline injectors that Hana created for them, although Mac becomes trapped in a nightmare of the loss of his family that the rest of Scorpio experiences through the Swarm Hivemind. Scorpio is able to plant their new Venom Bombs, but accidentally awaken the Hive in the process and have to fight off thousands of overwhelming Swarm forces as the deadly gas spreads. Tak is able to extract Scorpio as the Pahanu Hive is destroyed and Hana expresses a belief that destroying a Swarm Hive will kill all of the Swarm connected to it, taking out the remaining Swarm on the surface that they did not get. Hoffman rewards Lahni with a pardon for the crime that had sent her to prison and an official reinstatement into the COG and sets up a meeting for Keegan with his old commanding officer who survived the Locust War. Hoffman offers Mac a new mission now that they know that the Hivebuster plan works: destroy the Swarm Hive in the Outsider village of Bravelle, Mac's former home. Although Hoffman offers to find replacements, both Lahni and Keegan volunteer for the mission.

Scorpio is flown to the village of Croya due to Bravelle's inaccessibility by air where they witness the aftermath of the Swarm's decimation of the town. Mac finds and repairs his old delivery truck for transport while reliving his past as an award-winning delivery driver for both Croya and Bravelle before the Swarm attacked and killed everyone, including his young son Dillon. The Swarm attacks Scorpio, but they manage to escape in the delivery truck. However, an attack by a Swarm Flock wrecks the truck and forces Scorpio to continue the journey on foot, encountering the remains of the convoy where Mac's ex-wife and father lost their lives during a Swarm ambush that Mac barely escaped alive from.

Reaching Bravelle, Mac leads Scorpio to the old COG bunker containing the Hive where Scorpio allows themselves to be captured by Snatchers. In his pod, Mac experiences a dream of telling a bedtime story to Dillon before awakening. Scorpio is able to plant their Venom Bombs and fight their way out, but encounter and fight a Warden on the surface and all suffer injuries. Mac eventually manages to kill the Warden by ramming it with a truck and then stabbing it through the eye and Scorpio escapes the bunker as the Hive is destroyed.

Recovering Mac's old car, Scorpio drives back to Croya, but discovers that destroying a Swarm Hive does not kill all of the Swarm connected to it when they spot Swarm survivors off in the distance. Scorpio is attacked by the Flock again, but manage to kill it and are extracted by Tak. Mac decides to dedicate himself to continuing the mission of destroying Swarm Hives as it allows him to see Dillon again while he is podded and Lahni and Keegan agree to join him.

=== Film ===
In March 2007, New Line Cinema had purchased the rights to make a Gears of War film, with Stuart Beattie writing the script along with Marty Bowen and Wyck Godfrey, who would be producing it. Producer Wyck Godfrey said of the film adaptation: "I'm not a gamer, but what blew me away about Gears was how it captures the mythology of a war mission and how high the stakes are." Len Wiseman was reported to direct the movie adaptation of Gears of War in August, but Godfrey stated that they have "a director we're about to attach" in order to film the movie during 2009 and release in 2010. Cliff Bleszinski, the lead designer of the Gears of War video games, would serve as executive producer and consultant.

Wiseman signed on in June 2008, with Chris Morgan performing script rewrites. Morgan hinted on G4's televised coverage of Comic Con 2008 that the film would be a prequel to the first game, "it could explain how Marcus Fenix got his scar". According to Morgan, Wiseman "wants to make it as realistic as possible, and to blur those lines where your mind says, 'Oh, it's a big CGI film.'". Wyck Godfrey said in December 2009 that the intention of the Gears of War film was "to tell the epic story of an alien planet that's living in a horrific environment just feels like the wrong mood right now". In April 2010, New Line considerably scaled back the $100 million budget and story, stalling progress while they waited for a rewrite. Len Wiseman was no longer involved as he shifted his focus to other projects.

In April 2013, Variety reported that "Creative Artists Agency is eager to meet with producers in the coming weeks and set up the project elsewhere" and that Stuart Beattie would write the film. Scott Stuber is named to produce the film.

At the launch ceremony for Gears of War 4 in October 2016, The Coalition's Rod Fergusson affirmed that a Gears of War movie entered development for a theatrical release at Universal Pictures. Scott Stuber and Dylan Clark would produce the film under Universal's Bluegrass Films division, but no director or writer has been selected at this point. Fergusson also stated that where the film takes place relative to the games has been determined. Universal hired Shane Salerno to write the screenplay with Fergusson in May 2017, saying that "the movie won't be based on one of the games but a new story set in the universe." F. Scott Frazier was reported to write the film's script the following year. The film adaptation will not be set in the same universe as the video games. In November 2022, the film entered development for streaming on Netflix, who will collaborate with The Coalition on the film. In March 2023, Jon Spaihts was reported to be writing the film. On May 15, 2025, it was announced that David Leitch will direct and co-produce the movie.

=== Animated series ===
On November 7, 2022, an adult animated series based on the franchise was announced to be in the works at Netflix following the announcement of the film.

=== Merchandise ===
In July 2007, NECA announced they would be producing Gears of War merchandise, including action figures. The first series, available in the second quarter of 2008, included Augustus Cole, Anthony Carmine, Baird, a Locust Drone, a Locust Sniper, Dom Santiago and Marcus Fenix. TriForce Sales has obtained a license from Epic Games to create full-scale replicas of the armor and weapons from the game, with assistance of sculptor Sid Garrand of Nightmare Armor Studios. The units were available for advanced order in July 2008. Mindzeye Studios has created foot high statues of Gears of War characters.

== Reception ==
Aggregate review scores As of October 1, 2026.
Game	Metacritic
Gears of War	(PC) 87/100 (X360) 94/100
Gears of War 2	(X360) 93/100
Gears of War 3	(X360) 91/100
Gears of War: Judgment	(X360) 79/100
Gears of War: Ultimate Edition	(PC) 73/100 (XONE) 82/100
Gears of War 4	(PC) 86/100 (XONE) 84/100
Gears 5	(PC) 82/100 (XONE) 84/100 (XBSX) 83/100
Gears of War: E-Day	(PC) 84/100 (XSXS): 87/100

All of the Gears of War titles have been received positively, and the original trilogy is critically acclaimed. IGN rated Gears of War 3 the 22nd best Xbox 360 game, out of a list of 25. In 2010, Lasse Pulkkinen from Techno Buffalo called Gears of War 2 the best looking game on the Xbox 360. In 2011, readers of Guinness World Records Gamer's Edition voted Augustus Cole as the 46th-top video game character of all time.

=== Sales ===
According to Microsoft, the Gears of War series has sold over 22 million units and earned over US$1 billion in revenue as of January 2014.

== Legal issues ==
In January 2017, former American football player Lenwood Hamilton sued Epic Games, Microsoft, and voice actor Lester Speight, stating that the character of Cole Train in the series steals from his own likeness and voice. The lawsuit contends that elements of Cole's character, including being of African-American descent, having played in professional sports, and elements of the character's clothing were all elements representative of Hamilton, and voice analysis shows that Speight's delivery of Cole's lines matches too close with Hamilton's line. Hamilton had stated that Speight had approached him around 1998 about a video game, though Hamilton had turned it down due to the violence that would be in the game. Lenwood was ultimately unsuccessful in his bid: "The district court granted defendants' motion for summary judgment on First Amendment grounds, holding that defendants' First Amendment right to free expression in creating the Cole character that allegedly resembled plaintiff outweighed plaintiff's right of publicity". The United States Court of Appeals for the Third Circuit upheld the district court's decision, though Hamilton has petitioned to the U.S. Supreme Court for review. The Supreme Court denied to review the case in June 2021, leaving in place the summary judgment for Epic and Microsoft.

== Legacy ==
Former Naughty Dog developer Lucas Pope has stated that the Uncharted franchise drew inspiration from Gears of War, with the first game in the series being delayed after the first Gears of War game released in order for certain core gameplay and technical elements to more resemble that of the latter.
