= Terry Tate: Office Linebacker =

- Directed by: Rawson Marshall Thurber
- Written by: Peter Chiarelli
- Starring: Lester Speight
- Release dates: 2000; 2003
- Country: United States
- Language: English

Terry Tate: Office Linebacker was a series of short comedy television commercials created by Peter Arnell and the Arnell Group, for Reebok, based on a short film pilot created in 2000 by Rawson Marshall Thurber. Tate was first shown at Super Bowl XXXVII in 2003. The short films feature Lester Speight as "Terrible" Terry Tate, an American football linebacker who "gives out the pain" to those in the office who are not obeying office policies.

Originally, Reebok produced six episodes between August and December 2002 with another episode Terry Tate, Office Linebacker: Sensitivity Training being made on February 1, 2004. Even Reebok in the United Kingdom made an episode called Late Lunch on January 22, 2005. There are a total of nine episodes. The advertising campaign was one of the most successful of those in the history of the Super Bowl halftime shows.

Though successful in attracting viewers and attention, the ads' ability to increase recognition of the Reebok brand has been questioned, with only 55% of respondents on an on-line poll indicating they realized the ad was affiliated with the company. Despite being aired only once on national television, the short was downloaded more than seven million times from Reebok's website.

== Other appearances ==
=== Spoof of Nike ad ===
In February 2003, Reebok released a commercial featuring Tate that parodies a Nike, Inc. commercial. In the Nike version, a streaker disrupts a British football match; in the Reebok ad, Tate tackles the streaker then proclaims, "You just did it, so I had to hit it". The advertisement was one of several competitive and deliberate spoofs between the rival companies.

=== California recall election ===
In 2003, Terry Tate tried to run for governor in the 2003 California recall election, under the name "Lester Terry Tate Speight," but he did not gather enough signatures to qualify for the ballot.

=== 2008 U.S. presidential election ===
The Terry Tate character resurfaced in a series of short videos urging people to vote on November 4, including scenes that depict the Republican vice-presidential candidate Sarah Palin being (purportedly) tackled following famously controversial interviews.

Episodes

- "From Russia with Love" (October 16, 2008), Tate tackles Palin after she answers a question from Katie Couric about her foreign policy experience.

=== 2016 U.S. presidential election ===
During the 2016 U.S. presidential election, Funny or Die produced an altered version of the 2005 video of Donald Trump's lewd remarks to Billy Bush about women that had surfaced during the campaign. In the video, Terry Tate tackles a body double actor portraying Trump in response to Trump's remarks and tells Trump that's how he makes America great. He then turns to Bush and tells him he's fired.
