= Gears 5: Hivebusters =

- Developer: The Coalition
- Publisher: Xbox Game Studios
- Director: Matt Searcy
- Producers: Christi Rae; Zoë Curnoe
- Designers: Jolie Menzel; Pax Lyle; Scott Cowie
- Programmer: Jerry Edsall
- Artists: Jamie McNulty; Aryan Hanbeck
- Writer: Kurtis Wiebe
- Composer: Adam Lastiwka
- Series: Gears of War
- Engine: Unreal Engine 4
- Platforms: Windows; Xbox One; Xbox Series X/S
- Release: December 15, 2020
- Genre: Third-person shooter
- Modes: Single-player, multiplayer

Gears 5: Hivebusters is a downloadable content (DLC) expansion pack developed by The Coalition and published by Xbox Game Studios for the 2019 third-person shooter video game Gears 5. It was released for Windows, Xbox One, and Xbox Series X/S on December 15, 2020. The pack is a direct prequel to the Gears of War: Hivebusters comic book series, and follows the origin story of Scorpio Squad, an ad-hoc team of commandos who embark on suicide missions to combat the threat of the Swarm by infiltrating and sabotaging their Hives through the use of lethal toxins.

Gears 5: Hivebusters is the first single-player downloadable content pack for Gears 5. It received positive reviews from video game publications, who praised the fast-paced action, graphical quality, and the interactions between the pack's cast of characters, although some commentators found its short length to be detrimental to the overall gameplay experience.

== Gameplay ==
Hivebusters consists of a six-chapter story-driven campaign for Gears 5. The pack is set in the South Islands region in the world of Sera. The pack takes place sometime following the resurgence of the Locust Horde, now reborn as the Swarm, as a threat to the human civilizations of Sera as of Gears of War 4. As with the base game as well as past Gears of War titles, combat in Hivebusters consists of player-controlled characters engaging in firefights with enemy forces from behind cover within linear shootout arenas and set-pieces, though players may opt to eliminate enemy units through other methods, such as attacking them in melee combat or taking advantage of environmental hazards.

Players assume control of Scorpio Squad, a trio of playable characters from the "Escape" multiplayer mode of Gears 5: Jeremiah Keegan, a member of the Onyx Guard, an elite special operations unit which serves the Coalition of Government ("COG"), and de facto leader of Scorpio Squad; Lahni Kaliso, a COG operative descended from the indigenous peoples of the South Islands who was previously convicted of misconduct; and Leslie "Mac" Macallister, an Outsider delivery driver who lost his village community, including his son, to the emergent Swarm. Each character has access to a special ability which may be upgraded with collectible items over the course of the three hour campaign: Keegan may replenish the squad's ammo, Lahni may temporarily enhance the potency of her melee attacks with electricity, and Mac may erect a mobile energy shield in front of him to defend against incoming projectile attacks. The Hivebusters campaign may be played in cooperative mode by up to three players, either split-screen or online.

== Plot ==
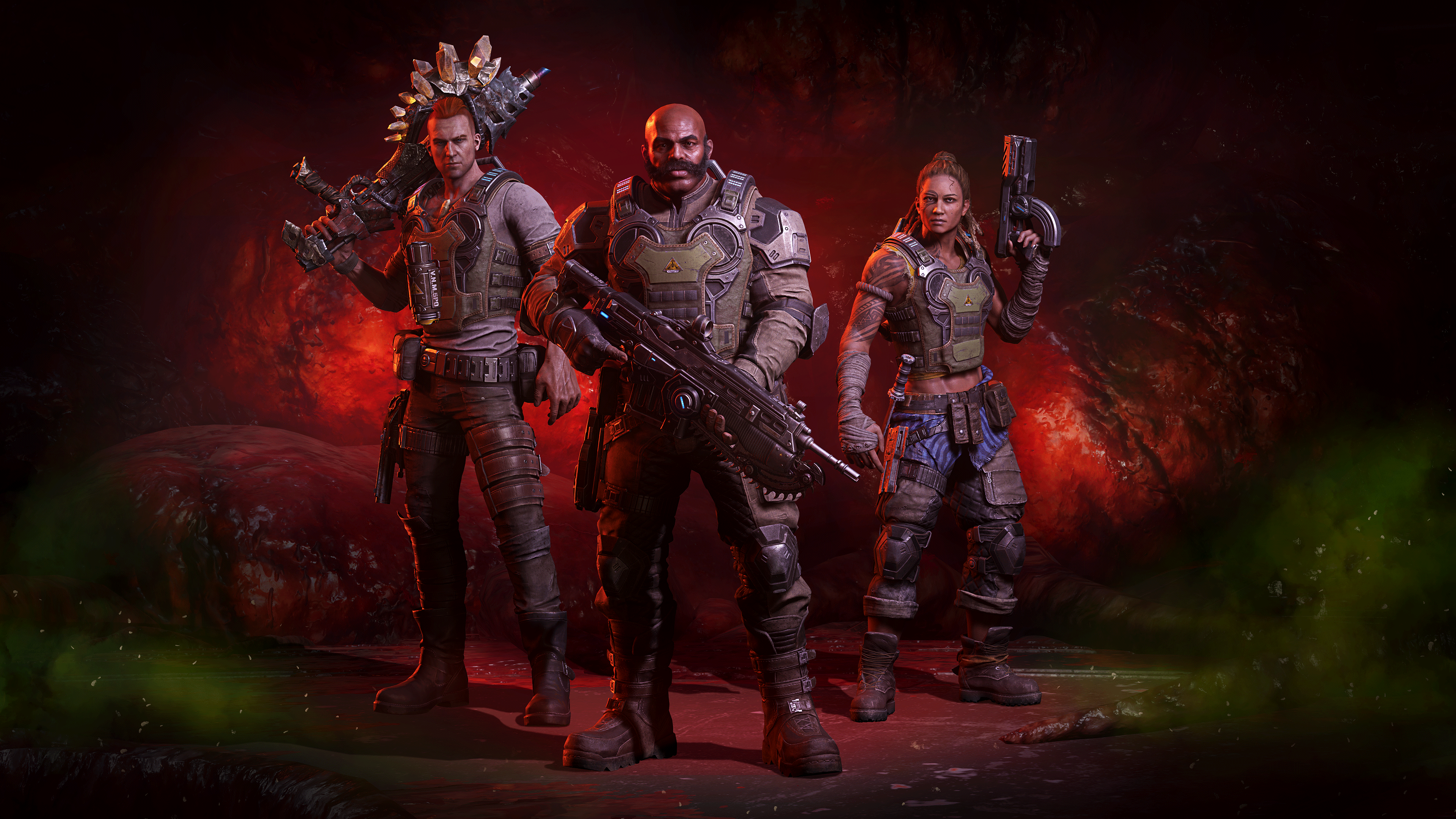
Members of Scorpio Squad, from left to right: Mac, Keegan, and Lahni.

Scorpio Squad's Condor air transport crashes on the island of Pahanu while en route to a secret mission. Scorpio sends out a distress signal and are rescued from Swarm forces by a King Raven helicopter piloted by Jasi Tak, an associate of recurring series character Colonel Victor Hoffman. Upon departure, they witness the Swarm forces being annihilated by an unseen, acid-spitting creature.

Scorpio are flown to the island of Galangi where they convene with Hoffman and the scientist Hana Cole, daughter of Delta Squad member Augustus Cole. Hoffman explains that Pahanu contains a Swarm hive beneath an old abandoned bunker and that he wants them to deliver a chemical bomb made with toxic gas recovered from the New Hope Research Facility to the hive. Leveraging Keegan's clearance level as a member of the Onyx Guard, Scorpio infiltrates the bunker. Mac impulsively tosses the bomb down a deep shaft, which kills many of the Swarm forces but fails to completely destroy the hive as it proves to be ineffective against heavier Swarm forces.

Returning to Hoffman and Hana, Scorpio reports on the failure of the bomb. Remembering the creature from the beach, Mac suggests using its venom against the Swarm. Hana theorizes that combining it with the New Hope gas could create an effective weapon. Lahni recalls stories that her grandmother had told her of a legendary creature and suggests visiting her kin on the nearby island of Weilehi to learn more about it. Joined by Hana, Scorpio visits the island, only to discover that the village has been overrun and its people consumed by the Swarm. Lahni finds information on the creature identifying it as the Wakaatu, a massive bird-like beast that spits a powerful toxic venom which the Weilehan use in a rite of passage known as the Awakening. They later discover that the Swarm were able to reach the island from Pahanu using lava tubes just before Hana is captured by a Snatcher. Scorpio chases the Snatcher through the lava tubes and rescues Hana, who is then airlifted out by Tak. Inspired by Hana's ordeal, Mac proposes an idea where the squad would allow themselves to be captured by Snatchers in order to reach the heart of a hive and deploy their bomb. Tak's King Raven is later attacked by the Wakaatu, but successfully escapes the creature.

Deducing that they are actually part of a rogue operation, Scorpio returns to Hoffman's estate and confronts him, where he admits that he had been forced into retirement after clashing with First Minister Jinn over her decision to rely on the COG's robotic army dubbed "DeeBees" as their line of defense against the Swarm. Nevertheless, Scorpio place their hope to stop the Swarm and save humanity on Hana's proposal to weaponize the Wakaatu's venom. Returning to Pahanu, Scorpio follows the path of the Awakening and reaches the Wakaatu's nest. The squad battles the Wakaatu and wounds it enough to take a sample of its venom and a feather each as per the Awakening ritual.

With the venom sample, Hana is able to synthesize a more lethal version of the bomb, and devises a way to protect the squad from the incapacitating effects of the Snatchers so that they can consciously free themselves once inside a Swarm hive and destroy it. Armed with their new venom bombs, Scorpio allow Snatchers to capture them, taking them to the Swarm hives on Pahanu island where they can be destroyed from within as depicted in the base game's "Escape" multiplayer mode and the Hivebusters comic series.

== Development and release ==
Gears 5: Hivebusters is the first single-player DLC pack for Gears 5. The pack was formally announced on December 8, 2020, and released worldwide on December 15, 2020. Hivebusters is available as a standalone purchase and is included with Gears 5: Game of the Year Edition, which launched on the same date. It is also included as a complimentary part of the Xbox Game Pass Ultimate tier subscription service on Console, PC and Android devices for subscribers.

Hivebusters serves as a prequel to the 2019 comic book series titled Gears of War: Hivebusters, which takes place sometime after the events of the pack in the same region, as well as the Outsider villages of Croya and Bravelle, the latter of which is Mac's former home. Hivebusters is written by Kurtis Wiebe, who also authored the Gears of War: Hivebusters comic series which had been collected as a graphic novel at the time of the pack's release; players who purchase the graphic novel may redeem in-game cosmetic items for use in the multiplayer modes of Gears 5.

== Reception ==
Reception

Aggregate scores
Aggregator	Score
Metacritic	XONE: 82/100; XBSX: 82/100
OpenCritic	92% recommend

Review scores
Publication	Score
Game Informer	8/10
IGN	8/10
Windows Central	8/10
Eurogamer Italy	8/10
GamingBolt	8/10
Screen Rant	3/5

According to review aggregator website Metacritic, Gears 5: Hivebusters received "generally favorable" reviews on all console platforms. Fellow review aggregator OpenCritic assessed that the game received "mighty" approval, being recommended by 92% of critics.
