= Gears of War: Ultimate Edition =

2015 video game

- Developer: The Coalition (Note: Original game developed by Epic Games. Reloaded was developed by The Coalition in collaboration with Sumo Digital and Disbelief.)
- Publisher: Xbox Game Studios
- Producer: Jarret Bradley
- Designer: Peder Skude
- Programmers: Kate Rayner (Note: Rayner came out as a trans woman in 2021, and is credited under her former name.); Jaysen Huculak
- Artist: Chris Matthews
- Series: Gears of War
- Engine: Unreal Engine 3
- Platforms: Xbox One; Windows; Reloaded; Windows; PlayStation 5; Xbox Series X/S
- Release: Xbox One: NA: August 25, 2015; AU: August 25, 2015; EU: August 28, 2015; Windows: WW: March 1, 2016; Reloaded: WW: August 26, 2025
- Genre: Third-person shooter
- Modes: Single-player, multiplayer

Gears of War: Ultimate Edition is a 2015 third-person shooter video game. It is a remastered edition of the 2006 video game Gears of War, the first installment of the Gears of War series, originally developed by Epic Games. Developed by The Coalition and published by Xbox Game Studios, Ultimate Edition is based on the original game's source code; The Coalition's goal for the project was to accurately preserve the original gameplay experience while updating its visual presentation for a contemporary console generation.

Ultimate Edition was released for the Xbox One in August 2015 and for Windows in March 2016. An enhanced port based on Ultimate Edition, Gears of War: Reloaded, was released in August 2025 for Windows, Xbox Series X/S, and PlayStation 5, marking the series' debut on non-Xbox consoles.

Reviews for the console version of Ultimate Edition by video game publications were predominantly positive, whereas the PC version was less positively received due to its technical issues. Praise was directed towards the improved graphics, sound, and the minimal deviations from the original gameplay experience, while criticism focused on AI issues and the dated design of campaign levels.

== Contents ==
Gears of War: Ultimate Edition is a remaster of Gears of War, a 2006 third-person shooter video game developed by Epic Games. The game features remastered graphics, textures, and sound. The game is natively displayed at 1080p or Full HD, and runs at 30 frames per second in the campaign, and 60 frames per second in multiplayer modes. Additional features include mechanics from newer Gears of War games, such as spotting and switching weapons while roadie running. Skill-based matchmaking was added for the game's multiplayer modes.

Ultimate Edition has the same plot as the original game, with visual upgrades and some stylistic changes. It adds five single-player chapters, which were exclusive to the PC version of the original game, to the campaign's fifth act. The additional chapters take place before the original Xbox 360 release's Special Delivery chapter, which describe the events of Delta Squad escaping a giant creature called a Brumak between the fourth and fifth acts, culminating in a boss fight with the Brumak. The ending cutscene is also changed to show a glimpse of Myrrah, the Locust Queen; in the original game, only her voice could be heard.

== Development and release ==
Following the acquisition of the Gears of War intellectual property by Microsoft from Epic Games in early 2014, The Coalition was formed and charged with the continuation and development of the franchise. Gears of War: Ultimate Edition was announced during Microsoft's press conference at E3 2015. It was the first Gears of War title developed by The Coalition under the leadership of studio head Rod Fergusson.

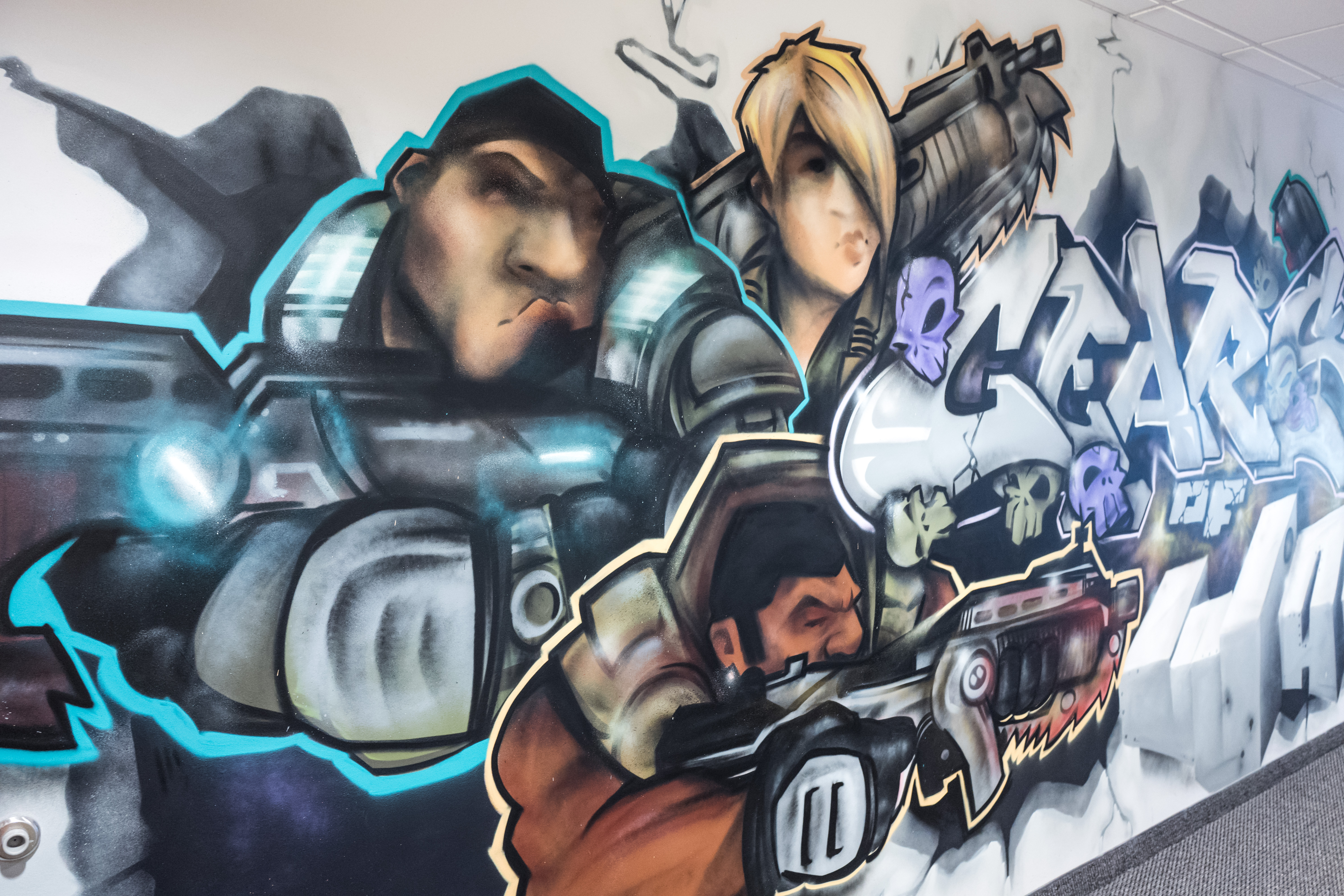
Gears of War-themed graffiti art at Epic Games headquarters in Cary, North Carolina, where the developmental team visited for consultations about the remastering project

The developmental period for Ultimate Edition took 18 months in total including pre-production, and included the remastering of over 3,000 art assets, original motion capture, and refinement of the control scheme. During the pre-production stage, the development team had to choose between starting with the original codebase, starting with the most recent iteration of the Unreal Engine 3, or update the entirety into Unreal Engine 4. It was determined that the team ought to maintain a playable build of the game throughout development, and so the best starting point was with the original codebase; from a content perspective, this meant things would already be working on the first day of developmental cycle. As they had limited exposure to the gameplay code, the team worked closely with Epic Games, the original developers, which included making site visits to their office for discussions and meetings. Technical Lead Jaysen Huculak said that the technical inconveniences and lack of efficiency encountered by dealing with the original gameplay scripting on the original engine is offset by the fact they did not have to rebuild everything from scratch and that the final product would be "true to the original".

As part of their "always playable" design philosophy, the team's budget for the project were set and maintained by monitoring real world performance in the game. The developers' decision to lock in 30 frames per second for the single-player campaign mode and 60 frames per second for multiplayer early in production was by deliberate design as opposed to a solution for technical limitations. Technical director Kate Rayner explained that they wanted to present Ultimate Edition as a visual showcase for Xbox One, just as the original game was for Xbox 360, and that it made sense to run the campaign at a consistent 30fps when its visuals are displayed at 1080p, as the results would not be as aesthetically pleasing otherwise.

Only select elements from the original were retained and unchanged, including voice performances and the score composed by Kevin Riepl. The raw animation data for characters had been kept to preserve the original gameplay experience, while the models themselves were revamped: as an example, the armor and skin ratio on a character model is weighted more appropriately so that the armor did not stretch as much and any objects holstered on a character's belts would display animations during the campaign. During an in-depth interview with Eurogamer, Huculak noted that all changes and enhancements to the original source code were implemented based on recommendations from their rendering team. Huculak said both the developers and the publisher have a good understanding of how different rendering features would perform on the Xbox One, which allowed the team to start with the original games' features running on Xbox One and, which were then combined with features from more up-to-date versions of the Unreal Engine 3 as well as Unreal Engine 4: the majority of the editor-facing features were drawn from Unreal Engine 3, while the developers also implemented Xbox One specific enhancements like eSRAM management or physically based shading technology drawn from the Unreal Engine 4. Huculak cited the Unreal Engine lighting solution, codenamed Lightmass, as an example of the technical expertise and knowledge involved with lighting in the developmental process.

According to the Technical Director of the Windows 10 port, Cam McRae, Ultimate Edition was developed with DirectX 12 in mind, which he said had allowed the team "much better control over the CPU load with heavily reduced driver overhead", some of which had been moved to the game where the team could have more control. Their main effort was in "parallelising the rendering system to take advantage of multiple CPU cores", with the "command list creation and D3D resource creation" being the focus, while optimization techniques from Unreal Engine 4 such as pipeline state object caching were pulled in where relevant. In contrast to its console counterpart, the PC version would support higher resolutions and frame rates, by scaling up on higher end hardware and supporting displays in 4K resolution. McRae said they intended to uncap the frame rate for the PC port and implement a built-in benchmark mode.

A promotional trailer released for Gears of War: Ultimate Edition paid homage to the original 2006 television advertisement, using the same cover by Gary Jules of the Tears for Fears song "Mad World". It was released worldwide for the Xbox One in North America and Asian-Pacific countries on August 25, 2015, and in Europe on August 28. Players who purchased the Ultimate Edition received early access to the multiplayer beta of Gears of War 4, which was released on April 18, 2016. It was subsequently released for Windows on March 1, 2016.

=== Technical issues ===
The Gnasher Shotgun, a staple choice for close-range combat in multiplayer games since the first Gears of War, occasionally failed to register damage from point-blank range in the multiplayer mode for Ultimate Edition shortly after its launch. The issue was considered to be unrelated to latency issues as it was also noted to occur on local split-screen multiplayer. The Coalition previously indicated that the Gnasher works the same way it did in the original game, as the way the shotgun pellets were distributed when firing was randomised. In response to player feedback, the Coalition released an update on September 24, 2015, and explained that they changed the Gnasher's randomised spread to the same shape pellet spread, so players can better predict and estimate the damage they are doing to opponents more accurately and consistently.

The initial PC release of Gears of War: Ultimate Edition, which was exclusively developed for Microsoft's Universal Windows Platform (UWP), suffered from significant display problems and stuttering on contemporary top-end hardware, especially with AMD Radeon graphic cards. Games developed for UWP are known to be subject to technical restrictions, including incompatibility with multi-video card setups, difficulties modding the game, overlays for gaming-oriented chat clients, or key binding managers. The specific technical issues observed in Ultimate Edition were linked to the developer's transition of the game to DirectX 12 and the implementation of ambient occlusion. Reports later emerged that driver updates and a subsequent patch released by the developers helped address the technical issues.

=== Gears of War: Reloaded ===
Gears of War: Reloaded, co-developed by The Coalition, Sumo Digital and Disbelief, was announced in May 2025 and was released on August 26, 2025, for Xbox Series X/S, Windows via the Microsoft Store and Steam, and PlayStation 5, marking the first time the Gears of War franchise has been made available on non-Xbox consoles. It is an updated port of Ultimate Edition, with an enhanced presentation at 4K resolution and 60 frames-per-second for the campaign, and 120FPS for multiplayer. Reloaded also supports High Dynamic Range (HDR) and Variable Refresh Rate (VRR) displays, as well as spatial audio technology. Additionally, the port collects all previously released post-launch downloadable content (DLC) from Ultimate Edition, including the bonus campaign, multiplayer maps and player cosmetics. Players using a Microsoft account are able to unlock full cross progression for the campaign and multiplayer components across all platforms, as well as cross-platform invites for multiplayer and the co-op campaign. Reloaded is free to all players who purchased Ultimate Edition digitally on Windows or Xbox One prior to the game's announcement. A physical release of the title is available exclusively for PS5 with the full campaign on-disc, while the multiplayer segment is a separate download. Microsoft confirmed that the PS5 version was not released in Japan due to local platform policies.

== Reception ==
Reception

Aggregate scores
Aggregator	Score
Metacritic	82/100 (XONE); 73/100 (PC)
OpenCritic	79% recommend (Reloaded) (Note: Based on 83 reviews)

Review scores
Publication	Score
Game Informer	8/10 (XONE)
GameRevolution	8/10 (XONE); 5/10 (PC)
GameSpot	7/10 (XONE)
GameStar	8/10 (PC)
Giant Bomb	4/10 (XONE)
Hardcore Gamer	8/10 (XONE); 6/10 (PC)
IGN	8.4/10 (XONE)
PC PowerPlay	6/10 (PC)
Polygon	8/10(XONE)
Shacknews	8/10 (XONE)

Gears of War: Ultimate Edition received "generally favorable" reviews from critics for the Xbox One version, while the PC version received "mixed to average" reviews, according to review aggregator website Metacritic.

Reviewing Ultimate Edition shortly after its release in August 2015, Brian Albert praised Ultimate Edition as a "beautiful game with smart cover mechanics, great core combat, and commitment to an over-the-top tone", and though it "occasionally shows signs of age", they were few and far between. Albert highly recommended Ultimate Edition as a starting point for newcomer players to the series, as it successfully preserved the original's "strong style and great gameplay", and made it enjoyable and relevant long after the original was released.

Matt Miller gave a favorable review of Ultimate Edition and praised the final product of The Coalition's visual and audio overhauls as "restored beauty". Miller found the gameplay to be mostly true to the original for better or worse, conceding that some of the shooting mechanics feel dated. Nevertheless, Miller described his experience with Ultimate Edition as a "fun and visually impressive trip down memory lane", and said that "new and old players alike should feel no hesitation about seeing this as the definitive way to play the opening story of the Gears epic".

Mike Mahardy from GameSpot considered Ultimate Edition to be a remake in all but name, as the alterations included a variety of content and design changes. To Mahardy, among the highlights for Ultimate Edition include 1080p and 60fps multiplayer, the well-tuned controls and cover mechanics which reinforces the title's status as "the apex of third-person shooters", and the visual improvements to the original's horror-driven single-player campaign which thoroughly reinforces a dark and personal tone. While less enthused about the campaign's late-game chapters and "frustrating AI", Mahardy summarized that the return trip "might have revealed a few more cracks than we remembered, but it also serves as a shield for our nostalgia".

Richard Leadbetter from Eurogamer opined that Ultimate Edition is "a full-on remake done right - fans and purists will have their own view on how the game should have been updated for the current-gen era, but there's no doubt that the vast majority of the game's visuals are updated beautifully", which he felt honored the spirit of the sourced material while presenting a radically new look based on modern rendering principles at the same time. Leadbetter noted that a performance analysis for the Xbox One version of Ultimate Edition conducted by the Digital Foundry team from Eurogamer showcased "mostly consistent performance across all modes with just some occasional hiccups".

In his review of Ultimate Edition, Arthur Gies from Polygon mused that it "doesn't feel new, exactly, but it does feel surprisingly relevant" in validating the original game as a landmark release in the video game industry, and declared that its "bonafides as a shooter classic feel less in dispute than ever". For Gies, Ultimate Edition "eloquently" demonstrates an adage that, "No medium is as beholden to the passage of time as video games." Gies said the result of The Coalition's insistence on delivering a "completely intact, gameplay-identical version of Gears' campaign, albeit one with a complete visual overhaul, and a revamped vision of the original game's multiplayer" made the final product "both better and worse" that one might remember of the original game, though he did consider Ultimate Edition to be an improvement overall.

Not all reception to Ultimate Edition had been positive. Jeff Gerstmann from Giant Bomb, who reviewed the original Xbox 360 version when he was employed at GameSpot, gave a negative review: he criticized the game's AI and campaign mode, noting that it "aged pretty poorly". Although certain publications such as GameStar have favorably reviewed the PC version, its technical issues attracted widespread criticism of the developer and Microsoft's Universal Windows Platform. Both GameRevolution and Hardcore Gamer gave favorable reviews for the Xbox One version in 2015, but published reviews with lower ratings for the PC version when it released the following year.
