= The Coalition (company) =

Canadian video game developer

- Formerly: Zipline Studios (2010–2011); Microsoft Game Studios Vancouver (2011–2012); Black Tusk Studios (2012–2015)
- Type: Division
- Industry: Video games
- Founded: February 2010; 16 years ago
- Headquarters: Vancouver, Canada
- Key people: Mike Crump (studio head); Kate Rayner (technical director)
- Products: Gears of War series
- Number of employees: 200 (2015)
- Parent: Xbox Game Studios
- Website: thecoalitionstudio.com

The Coalition (formerly Zipline Studios, Microsoft Game Studios Vancouver and Black Tusk Studios) is a Canadian video game developer based in Vancouver, part of Xbox Game Studios.

The company was founded by Microsoft as Zipline Studios in 2010. Following the release of its debut game, Relic Rescue (2011), Zipline was renamed Microsoft Game Studios Vancouver. In February 2012, the studio released the flight simulator Microsoft Flight. Later that year, in November, Microsoft Game Studios Vancouver was rebranded as Black Tusk Studios to develop a new game.

After Microsoft acquired the rights to the franchise Gears of War in 2014, the studio was commissioned to develop new games in the series. Black Tusk was renamed The Coalition in June 2015, and in August released Gears of War: Ultimate Edition, a remaster of the original Gears of War (2006). It developed Gears of War 4 (2016) and Gears 5 (2019) and worked on spin-off games in collaboration with other developers. The studio continued to develop the Gears franchise in collaboration with other developers, including upcoming Gears of War: E-Day (2026).

== History ==
Microsoft established the company as Zipline Studios in February 2010. The following year, Zipline released the Facebook game Relic Rescue and was renamed Microsoft Game Studios Vancouver. In February 2012, the studio released the flight simulator Microsoft Flight to mixed reviews.

Citing a need to realign the company's long-term goals and development plans, Microsoft ended continued development of Microsoft Flight in July 2012. This decision coincided with the cancellation of Project Columbia, an unannounced Kinect shooter game, and the layoff of all 35 employees. In November, Microsoft Game Studios Vancouver was rebranded as Black Tusk Studios and tasked with developing a major franchise for Microsoft Studios, comparable to its Halo franchise.

In 2014, Microsoft acquired the rights to the franchise Gears of War from Epic Games and the developers in-development game was canceled in favor of developing a new title in the franchise. Rod Fergusson, who had been the producer of the franchise at Epic, became the head of the studio. Black Tusk was renamed The Coalition—a reference to an entity within the Gears of War franchise, the Coalition of Ordered Governments—in June 2015. Two months later, the studio released Gears of War: Ultimate Edition, a remaster of the original Gears of War (2006), which was generally well-received by critics.

Shortly before the release of Ultimate Edition, The Coalition announced Gears of War 4. Released in 2016, the game received favorable reviews and was nominated for best action game of the year at both the D.I.C.E. Awards and The Game Awards. The Coalition then collaborated with Mediatonic to develop the real-time strategy Gears Pop!, released in August 2019 to mixed reviews. The following month, the studio released Gears 5. The game was met with positive reviews and received several award nominations, (Note: Attributed to multiple references:) including Xbox Game of the Year at the Golden Joystick Awards, which it won.

In March 2020, Fergusson left his position to join Blizzard Entertainment, and director of operations Mike Crump assumed the role. The studio collaborated with Splash Damage to develop the turn-based tactics Gears Tactics, which was released in April and met with positive critical reception. Later that year, in December, The Coalition released Gears 5: Hivebusters, a downloadable expansion pack which also received positive reviews.

In May 2021, the studio announced its transition to the Unreal Engine 5 game engine for future projects. The Coalition supported 343 Industries in the development of Halo Infinite and contributed to the Xbox Series X/S optimization of a tech demo The Matrix Awakens, both released in December. In 2023, Microsoft conducted widespread layoffs that resulted in a reduction of staff at the studio. Gears of War: Reloaded, a remastered version of the original game, was released in August 2025 and co-developed by The Coalition, Sumo Digital, and Disbelief. The studio also collaborated with People Can Fly on Gears of War: E-Day, a prequel released in 2026, coinciding with the series' 20th anniversary.

== Games developed ==
=== As Zipline Studios ===
Year	Title	Platform(s)	Publisher(s)	Ref.
2011	Relic Rescue	Facebook	Facebook, Inc.	

=== As Microsoft Game Studios Vancouver ===
Year	Title	Platform(s)	Publisher(s)	Ref.
2012	Microsoft Flight	Windows	Microsoft Studios	

=== As The Coalition ===
Year	Title	Platform(s)	Publisher(s)	Notes	Ref.
2015	Gears of War: Ultimate Edition	Windows, Xbox One	Microsoft Studios	Remaster of Gears of War (2006), developed by Epic Games	
2016	Gears of War 4	Windows, Xbox One	Microsoft Studios	—N/a	
2019	Gears Pop!	Android, iOS, Windows	Xbox Game Studios	Developed in collaboration with Mediatonic	
2019	Gears 5	Windows, Xbox One, Xbox Series X/S	Xbox Game Studios	Also developed the expansion pack Hivebusters (2020)	
2020	Gears Tactics	Windows, Xbox One, Xbox Series X/S	Xbox Game Studios	Developed in collaboration with Splash Damage	
2021	Halo Infinite	Windows, Xbox One, Xbox Series X/S	Xbox Game Studios	Supportive development for 343 Industries	
2021	The Matrix Awakens	PlayStation 5, Xbox Series X/S	Epic Games	Supportive development for Epic Games	
2025	Gears of War: Reloaded	PlayStation 5, Windows, Xbox Series X/S	Xbox Game Studios	Remaster of Gears of War, developed in collaboration with Sumo Digital and Disbelief	
2026	Gears of War: E-Day	Windows, Xbox Series X/S	Xbox Game Studios	Developed in collaboration with People Can Fly	

=== Cancelled ===
- Project Columbia
