= Gears Pop! =

2019 real-time strategy game

- Developers: Mediatonic; The Coalition
- Publisher: Xbox Game Studios
- Series: Gears
- Platforms: Microsoft Windows; Android; iOS
- Release: August 22, 2019
- Genre: Real-time strategy
- Mode: Multiplayer

Gears Pop! was a mobile real-time strategy video game in which two players battle using Funko Pop!-stylized characters from the Gears fictional universe. Its gameplay was modeled on that of Clash Royale. The game was released on August 22, 2019, on Android, iOS, and Windows platforms, about a month in advance of the next major entry in the series, Gears 5. The game was developed by UK-based developer Mediatonic along with The Coalition.

== Gameplay ==
In Gears Pop, two players battle by playing tokens on a playfield, which spawned Funko Pop-stylized characters from the Gears of War fictional universe. The characters used cover points to advance on the enemy's two defense turrets and home base before the opponent accomplishes the same. Apart from its cover mechanics, its gameplay heavily resembled that of Clash Royale.

The game was free-to-play and used microtransactions. It was one of the few mobile games to feature Xbox achievement compatibility.

== Development ==
The game was announced at E3 2018 and was released on August 22, 2019, on Android, iOS, and Windows platforms, about a month prior to the next major release in the series, Gears 5.

The servers for the game were shut down on April 26, 2021.

== Reception ==
Reception

Aggregate score
Aggregator	Score
Metacritic	iOS: 64/100

Review scores
Publication	Score
Jeuxvideo.com	14/20
Pocket Gamer	3/5

Gears Pop received "mixed or average" reviews, according to review aggregator Metacritic.

Pocket Gamer gave the game three stars out of five, writing, "Gears POP! is a decent mobile strategy game, one which can keep your attention for hours thanks to online play, but it's not the best in its genre either."

Within a week of launch, Gears Pop had over one million users.

== See also ==
- Funko Fusion
