= Rod Fergusson =

Canadian video game producer

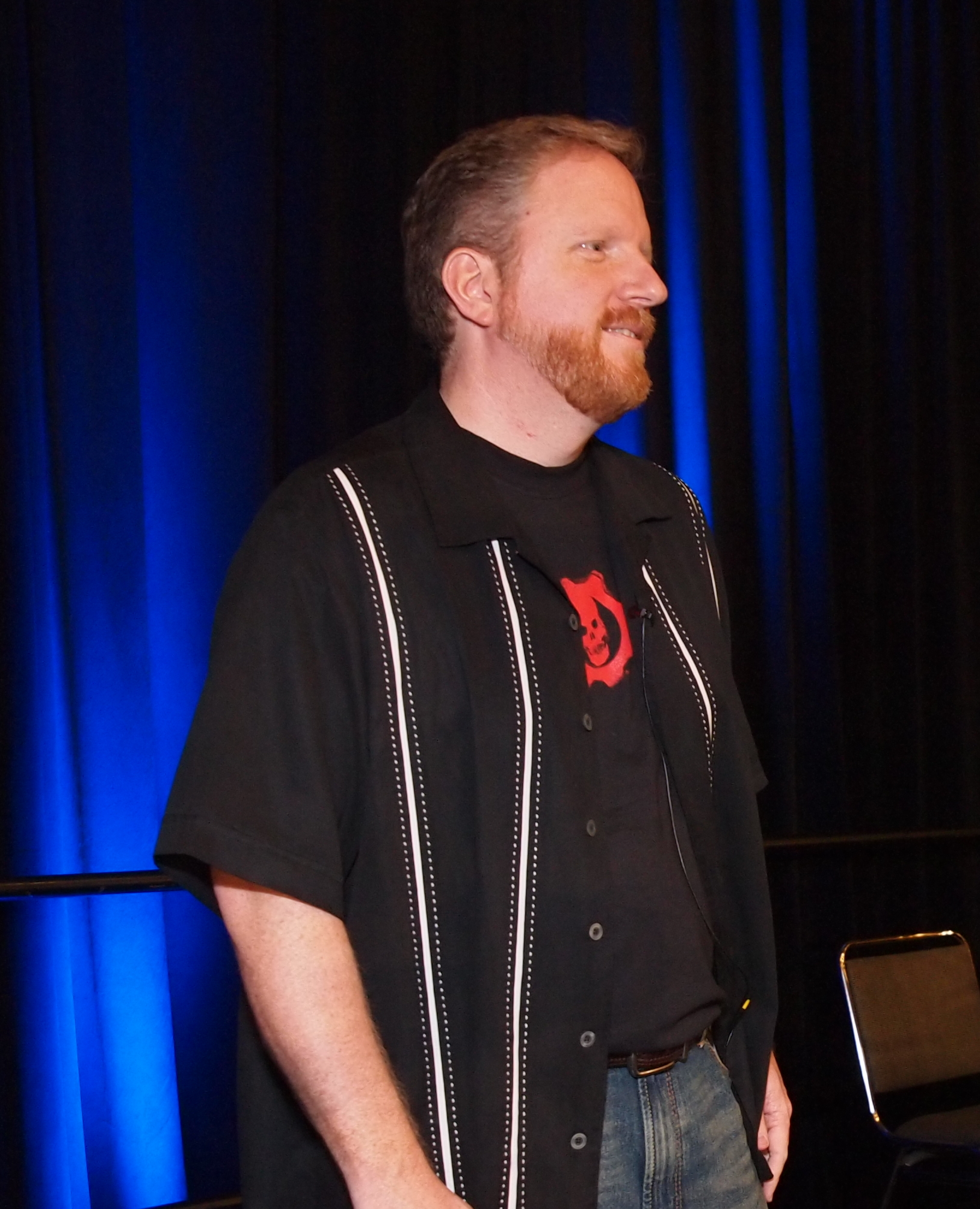
- Fergusson at the 2011 Game Developers Conference
- Occupation: Game producer
- Years active: 1996–present
- Employer(s): Microsoft (1996–2005); Epic Games (2005–2012); Irrational Games (2012–2013); The Coalition (2014–2020); Blizzard Entertainment (2020–2025); Cloud Chamber (2025–present)

Rod Fergusson is a Canadian video game producer, best known for overseeing the development of the Gears of War franchise, originally at Epic Games and then as head of The Coalition, and heading development on the Diablo series at Blizzard Entertainment. He currently is leading the development of the BioShock franchise at Cloud Chamber under 2K Games.

== Career ==
=== Early years and Microsoft (1996–2005) ===
Fergusson grew up in Ontario, Canada, and while he had an interest in video games, he thought the industry was too far out of reach for him, though he had programmed his own multi-user dungeon (MUD).

Fergusson started his career in 1996 at Microsoft, initially as part of its consulting services providing technical support to enterprise customers with Microsoft Solutions Framework before moving into the Redmond campus directly. While there, an opening at Microsoft Game Studios under Shannon Loftis opened up, which Fergusson was able to get. He joined Microsoft's internal simulations group, later renamed to Aces Game Studio, where one of the first projects he worked on was Microsoft Train Simulator alongside Kuju Entertainment. With the release of the first Xbox console in 2002, Fergusson also worked with Stormfront Studios to help finish Blood Wake as a launch title for the console. After a few months exploring a possible new internal studio within Microsoft, Fergusson returned to a producer role to help bring Valve's Counter-Strike to the Xbox, as the project at Ritual Entertainment was behind schedule. He helped to bring the multiplayer game to the Xbox by 2003, and assisted in setting pace for the single-player Counter-Strike: Condition Zero to be completed by 2003, though ultimately, Valve dropped much of Ritual's work and had the single-player game reworked by Turtle Rock Studios.

=== Epic Games (2005–2012) ===
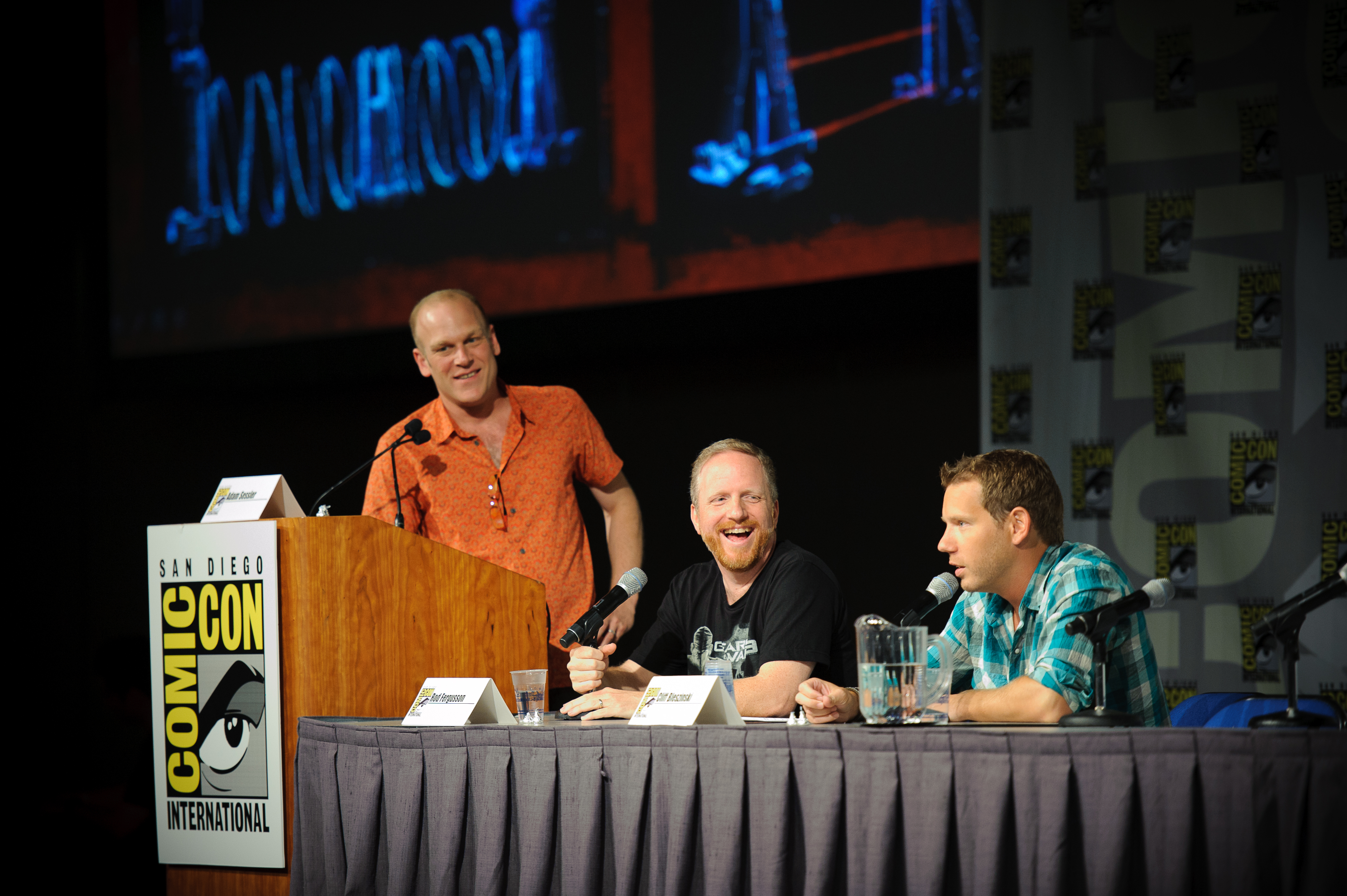
Adam Sessler, Rod Fergusson, and Cliff Bleszinski at the Gears of War 3 panel, Comic-Con International 2011.

Between 2003 and 2005, Fergusson worked on two unannounced titles within Microsoft. In early 2005, Fergusson was introduced to the upcoming Gears of War from Epic Games, targeted for Microsoft's new Xbox 360 console. Fergusson described the state of the game as being "on fire" and well behind schedule, which he attributed to Epic having only one producer at the time, splitting duties between Gears and Unreal Tournament 3. Fergusson discussed the situation with Microsoft where it was determined the best route would be for him to quit Microsoft and join Epic in a full-time capacity to help get Gears back on track, and by July 2005, Fergusson was working at Epic as an executive producer and helping to get the game ready for release over the next 18 months. Eventually Fergusson became director of production, participating in development for the entire Gears of War series. While at Epic, Fergusson also helped with some of its other projects, including Bulletstorm which was also a similarly-troubled project as it neared its release window.

Another project at Epic that Fergusson helped with was the mobile game series Infinity Blade that was conceived by Donald Mustard of Epic's subsidiary Chair Entertainment. While Fergusson had partially helped with the design, he "[didn't] get mobile" and games that focused on endless repetition of gameplay. Around 2012, Epic began discussions with Tencent Holdings as the company wanted to get into the mobile and free-to-play market, an area Tencent had great experience in. In June 2012, Tencent invested into Epic Games as to obtain a 40% minority ownership of the company, but which Epic CEO Tim Sweeney said would not affect the creative output of Epic Games.

=== Irrational Games (2012–2013) ===
Fergusson, believing that this investment by Tencent would move Epic away from the type of "AAA, big-narrative, big-story, big-impact game" he preferred working on, left Epic and on August 9, 2012, joined Irrational Games as executive vice president of development during the final stretch of development of BioShock Infinite. Fergusson had gained a reputation from his days at Microsoft and Epic as a "closer", a management-level position that would help bring a troubled project to completion. He was brought into this same role at Irrational as to assist the game's lead, Ken Levine, to make tough decisions on what content and gameplay that they needed to cut as to deliver the game following nearly a decade of development.

Following BioShock Infinite's release in March 2013, Fergusson announced his plans to depart Irrational that April, though had not confirmed where he would go next and was remaining there for a few months to help on transition. Fergusson said "I am very proud of the work that I did and of the team and what they were able to accomplish on Infinite. Now with the game shipped successfully, I've done what I set out to do here and now I'm looking forward to the next chapter in my life and career." Fergusson later said in a 2020 interview that the short period he had spent at Irrational validated the concept that he was a good "closer", someone capable of helping to complete a troubled project to get it released on time, and for which had begun to get an industry reputation for. Fergusson said that he found himself enjoying helping to close out the development cycle of games. In September 2013, Fergusson had been tapped to lead an upcoming new studio under 2K Games (Irrational's parent) in the San Francisco area. Fergusson later identified this studio as Hangar 13 and had been working on Mafia III. He decided to leave due to having creative differences with the senior management at 2K.

=== Black Tusk/The Coalition (2014–2020) ===
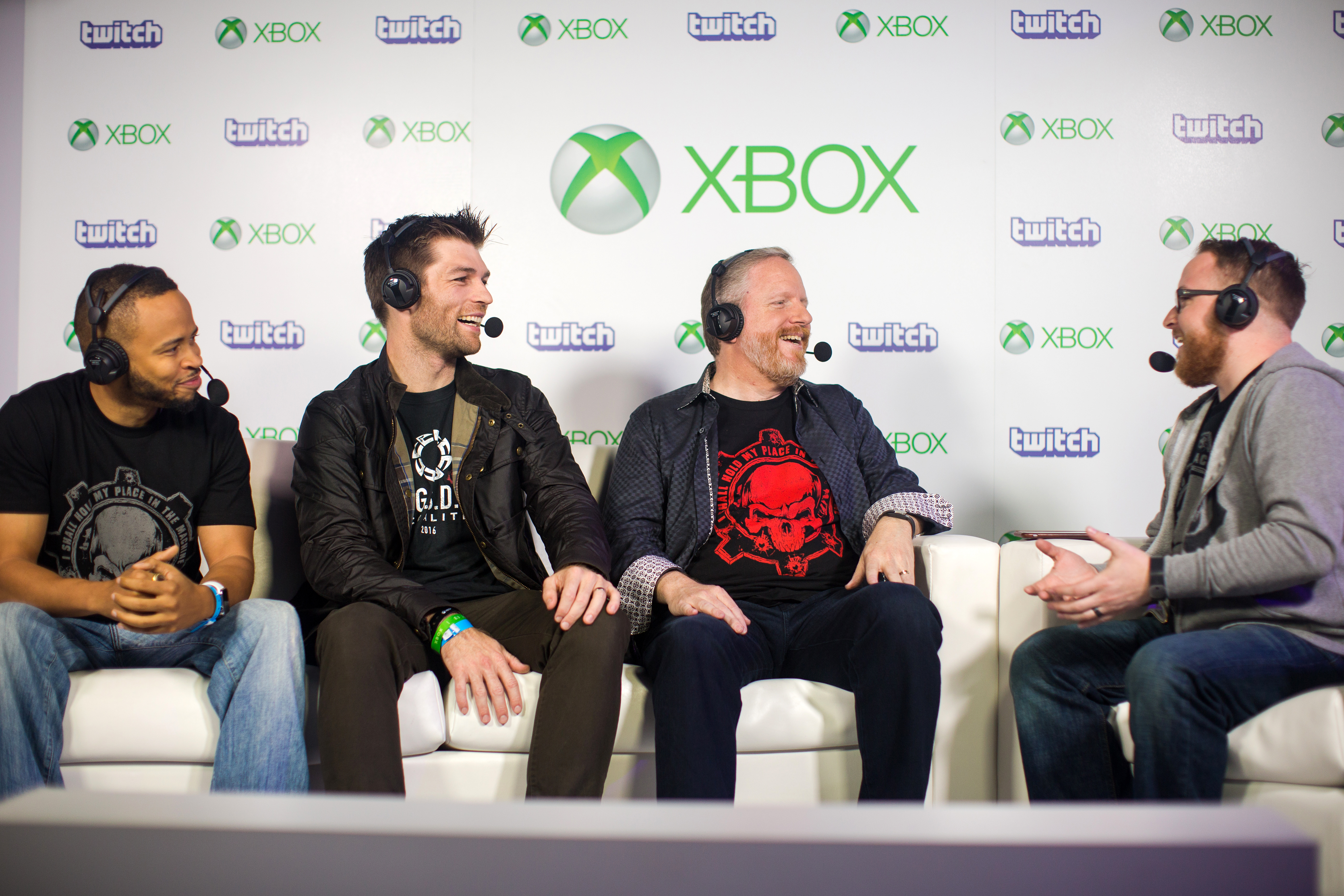
Rod Fergusson at E3 2016 with Gears of War 4 actors Eugene Byrd and Liam McIntyre.

During 2013, Microsoft began talking with Epic about acquiring the Gears of War franchise with plans to assign it to Black Tusk Studios. Fergusson heard of this and contacted Microsoft, eager to work on the series again. Microsoft affirmed the acquisition on January 27, 2014, and confirmed Fergusson would be hired into a leadership position at Black Tusk Studios. Fergusson said "I've been privileged to work on a lot of great games with a lot of great teams, but Gears has had the most impact on me professionally and personally, so this really feels like a homecoming." Fergusson also stated that he felt that with Microsoft's resources, they would do much more with the series than at Epic. Black Tusk was later renamed to The Coalition (based on a fictional entity within the Gears series) in June 2015. Over the next three years, Fergusson helped lead development on the remastered version of the first Gears game and the fourth and fifth entry in the series. The last two games shifted the main character and setting for the game, which Fergusson said was meant to be comparable to the contrast between Tim Burton's and Christopher Nolan's Batman films.

=== Blizzard (2020–2025) ===
Fergusson left the Coalition in February 2020, moving over to Blizzard Entertainment to oversee development of the Diablo series, including Diablo IV. Fergusson opted to leave Blizzard in August 2025, saying that he felt the Blizzard team was poised to be successful in the future.

=== Cloud Chamber (2025-Present) ===
Following his departure from Blizzard, Fergusson returned to 2K as the new head of the BioShock franchise. According to Fergusson he will "be heading up Cloud Chamber and overseeing development of the next BioShock game, along with franchise extensions like the in-development Netflix movie".

== Video game credits ==
Fergusson has been credited on the following games:

Year	Title	Role
2001	Microsoft Train Simulator	Project Management
2002	Blood Wake	Project Management
2003	Half-Life: Counter-Strike	Project Management
2006	Gears of War	Producer
2007	Unreal Tournament 3	Battlefield surgeon
2008	Gears of War 2	Senior producer
2009	Fat Princess	Epic games staff
2009	Shadow Complex	Executive producer
2010	Lost Planet 2	Executive producer
2010	Infinity Blade	Executive producer
2011	Bulletstorm	Executive producer
2011	Gears of War 3	Executive producer
2011	Infinity Blade II	Director of production
2012	Vote: The Game	Director of production
2013	Gears of War: Judgment	Executive producer
2013	BioShock Infinite	Executive Vice President of Development
2016	Gears of War 4	Studio Head
2018	Sea of Thieves	Team Xbox
2019	Gears 5	Studio Head
2019	Gears Pop!	Studio Head
2020	World of Warcraft: Shadowlands	Blizzard Development Family
2021	Diablo II: Resurrected	Executive producer
2023	Overwatch (2023)	SVP & General Manager, Diablo
2023	Diablo IV	General manager
2023	Warcraft Rumble	General Manager, Diablo
2024	Diablo IV: Vessel of Hatred	General manager
2026	Diablo IV: Lord of Hatred	General manager
