= List of level editors =

This is a list of level editors for video games. Level editors allow for the customization and modification of levels within games.

== Official or single games ==
| Editor | Game(s) | Notes | Ref |
|---|---|---|---|
| 3D Construction Kit | | | |
| Boulder Dash Construction Kit | | | |
| CoD2Radiant | Call of Duty 2 | | |
| CoD4Radiant | Call of Duty 4 | | |
| CoDRadiant | Call of Duty | | |
| Dezaemon | Dezaemon (NES, 1991); Dezaemon 2 (Sega Saturn, 1997); Dezaemon 3D (Nintendo 64, 1998); Dezaemon BS Version - Sugoi Shooting (?????BS? ?????????) (Satellaview, 1996); Sugoi STG!! Jintai (??STG!! ??) (Apr-Aug 1996); Sugoi STG-2: Crystal Guardian (May-Dec 1996); Dezaemon BS Version - BS-X Shooting (?????BS? BS-X???????) (Satellaview, Apr-Aug 1996); Dezaemon Kids! (PlayStation, 1998); Dezaemon Plus (?????PLUS) (PlayStation, 1996) | | |
| Doom Builder | Doom; Doom II source ports such as ZDoom | Includes an ACS scripting editor | |
| DromEd | Thief: The Dark Project; Thief 2: The Metal Age | For the Dark Engine | |
| Fushigi | Super Mario Bros. Wonder | | |
| Geometry Dash | Geometry Dash | Level editor | |
| irrEdit | | For the Irrlicht Engine | |
| Jazz Creation Station | Jazz Jackrabbit 2 Jazz Jackrabbit 2: The Secret Files | | |
| Lunar Magic | Super Mario World | | |
| Mega Man Maker | Mega Man | | |
| Pinball Construction Set | | | |
| Q3Radiant | Quake 3 | | |
| Q4Radiant | Quake 4 | | |
| QERadiant | | For the id Tech 3 | |
| QuakeEd | Quake | For NeXTSTEP | |
| Rayman Designer | Rayman Gold | | |
| Super Mario Maker | Super Mario Maker | | |
| Super Mario Maker 2 | Super Mario Maker 2 | | |
| Tomb Raider Level Editor | Tomb Raider: The Last Revelation | | |
| UnrealEd | Unreal series, Deus Ex | | |
| UnrealEd 2 | Thief: Deadly Shadows | | |
| Valve Hammer Editor | Half-Life 2 Left 4 Dead 2 Portal and other Valve games | For the Source Engine | |
| Warcraft III World Editor | Warcraft III: Reign of Chaos; Warcraft III: Frozen Throne | | |
| WarioWare D.I.Y. | | | |
| Warlords II Scenario Builder | Warlords II; Warlords II Deluxe | | |
| World Builder | Command & Conquer: Generals; Command & Conquer: Generals – Zero Hour; Battle for Middle-Earth; Battle for Middle-Earth 2 Command & Conquer 3: Tiberium Wars; Command & Conquer 3: Kane's Wrath | For the SAGE engine | |
| Worldcraft | Half-Life | | |

== Generic ==
- Gamestudio a commercial level editor for the gamestudio engine
- Grome by Quad Software
- GtkRadiant by id Software, Loki Software, Infinity Ward, and Treyarch
- Future Pinball - A pinball editor.
- QuArK, Quake Army Knife editor, for a variety of engines (such as Quake III Arena, Half-Life, Source engine games, Torque, etc.)
- Quiver (level editor), a level editor for the original Quake engine developed solely for the Classic Macintosh Operating System by Scott Kevill, who is also the developer and administrator of GameRanger
- Visual Pinball
- Stencyl includes a Scene Designer module which is used to place tiles, actors, and assign behaviors and settings.

== See also ==
- noclip.website, an online map viewer for levels from various games
