= JJR =

JJR may refer to:

- Japanese Journal of Radiology
- Jazz Jackrabbit, video game series
  - Jazz Jackrabbit (1994 video game)
  - Jazz Jackrabbit (2002 video game)
- Jejuri, in Maharashtra, India
- Zhár (Bankal) dialect of Jarawa language of Nigeria
