= Jazz Jackrabbit =

Video game series

- Jazz Jackrabbit, the eponymous character of the series
- Genre: Platform
- Developers: Epic MegaGames; Game Titan
- Publishers: Gathering of Developers; Jaleco
- Platforms: MS-DOS; Mac OS; Linux; Game Boy Advance; Windows; Windows Phone
- First release: Jazz Jackrabbit; August 1, 1994
- Latest release: Jazz Jackrabbit; December 20, 2002

Jazz Jackrabbit is a series of platform games featuring the eponymous character, Jazz Jackrabbit, a green anthropomorphic hare who fights with his nemesis, Devan Shell, in a science fiction parody of the fable The Tortoise and the Hare. Created by Arjan Brussee and Cliff Bleszinski and developed by Epic Games, the series debuted on MS-DOS in 1994 with Jazz Jackrabbit. The series consists of two PC games and a handheld game.

== Games ==
Release timeline
1994	Jazz Jackrabbit
1995
1996
1997
1998	Jazz Jackrabbit 2
1999
2000
2001
2002	Jazz Jackrabbit (2002)

=== Jazz Jackrabbit (1994) ===
The first Jazz Jackrabbit game was developed and published by Epic MegaGames and released in 1994 for MS-DOS. Jazz had to rescue Carrotus princess Eva Earlong, who was kidnapped by his nemesis, Devan Shell. The shareware edition was extremely popular and the game was named Arcade Game of the Year by PC Format.

=== Jazz Jackrabbit 2 (1998) ===
Jazz Jackrabbit 2 was developed by Orange Games and Epic MegaGames, and published by Gathering of Developers in the United States, Project 2 Interactive in Europe and P&A in Japan. Jazz and his siblings, Spaz and Lori, attempt to retrieve Eva's stolen wedding ring from Devan. Despite moderate success in Europe, the game was a commercial failure for Gathering of Developers.

=== Jazz Jackrabbit 3 ===
Jazz Jackrabbit 3 title screen

Jazz Jackrabbit 3 (alternatively called Jazz Jackrabbit 3D: Adventures of a Mean Green Hare) is the cancelled game of the series. Spearheaded by Dean "Noogy" Dodrill (an animator for Jazz Jackrabbit 2) and coded by World Tree Games, it was being developed for the Unreal Engine 1 in 1999. As the game's alternate name implies, it would have been rendered in 3D. The game was planned for release on PC and PlayStation 2.

Development of the game was ceased part way through in May 2000 as Epic Games was unable to find a publisher; an unfinished demo was subsequently leaked online. While only Jazz is playable in the demo, Spaz and Lori were intended to return as additional playable characters.

Following the events of the preceding game, Jazz Jackrabbit and Eva Earlong settle down in Carrotus Castle and become parents. Devan Shell kidnaps their children, taking them into an alternate universe via a modified time machine.

Jazz Jackrabbit 3 is a third-person shooter with platforming and adventure game elements. The mouse is used to aim and shoot, while the keyboard moves one around the world. The player can fire their weapon, or charge up for a more powerful shot. The arsenal can be expanded using coins collected to purchase new weapons and combine them with Elemental "Dream Cells" to create various weapon effects. In the demo, only Fire and Ice Dream Cells can be acquired, and usable with two guns (the standard Blaster and the Gizmo Gun).

Unlike the previous installments, Jazz Jackrabbit 3 has no levels. It is instead divided into sections, similar to Super Metroid. At specific points in the map, the player can travel back and forth between these sections. Each new area that is visited is prefaced by its name.

=== Jazz Jackrabbit (2002) ===
Jazz Jackrabbit, developed by Game Titan and published by Jaleco under license from Epic Games, was released for the Game Boy Advance in 2002. As a reboot to the series, several changes were done in overall design, oriented towards space opera in a similar vein to Star Wars. Jazz was redesigned to resemble Han Solo. Eva and Lori are missing from the game while Devan Shell has been replaced by Dark Shell. Spaz appears as a non-playable character.

== Legacy ==
Jazz, Devan and Eva make guest appearances in One Must Fall: 2097 in single-player tournament mode. Each character pilots a fighting mech that is suited to their individual personalities.

At one point, Epic MegaGames was considering an animated series based on Jazz Jackrabbit, as evidenced by Epic filing a trademark registration for the name "Jazz Jackrabbit" on March 28, 1997. The application contains a description for goods and services which says "entertainment in the nature of animated TV series".

In December 2010, Epic Games released development kits for the Unreal Engine on iOS. One of the tutorials for these devkits features Jazz Jackrabbit as a top down twin-stick shooter game.

In 2017, a Jazz Jackrabbit easter egg appeared in Fortnite. In August 2026, a Jazz Jackrabbit item known as the “Jackrabbit Sprite” was added during Fortnite’s gaming-themed Overdrive season, appearing as a collectable power-up in the game’s Battle Royale mode.

In August 2022, Jazz Jackrabbit Doom TC, a fan conversion mod for Doom II, was released. It runs through GZDoom or LZDoom.
