= Quake modding =

Modding in the Quake video game series

Based on id Software's open stance towards game modifications, their Quake series became a popular subject for player mods beginning with Quake in 1996. Spurred by user-created hacked content on their previous games and the company's desire to encourage the hacker ethic, Id included dedicated modification tools into Quake, including the QuakeC programming language and a level editor. As a game that popularized online first-person shooter multiplayer, early games were team- and strategy-based and led to prominent mods like Team Fortress, whose developers were later hired by Valve to create a dedicated version for the company. Id's openness and modding tools led to a "Quake movie" community, which altered gameplay data to add camera angles in post-production, a practice that became known as machinima.

== Background ==
Player modifications, or mods, change a game's art or gameplay to create alternative or entirely new games. From the age of Atari through the 1990s, video game developers were known vigilantly protect their intellectual property through copyrights, patents, and general secrecy. In contrast, Id Software founders John Carmack and John Romero were instead excited when their Wolfenstein 3D was hacked to swap content into the game, and decided to help rather than hinder the hacker ethic of those who would modify their later games, including Doom and Quake. Doom added new graphical detail to its first-person shooter predecessors (wall textures, varied environments) and local, networked multiplayer, but in 1996, Quake too added better graphics in a fully 3D world but became known for its Internet-based, long-distance multiplayer. It popularized consumer graphics cards with its implementation of 3D rendering under OpenGL technology, and its dedicated developer tools encouraged users to create their own modifications, spawning a "healthy mod scene". Around the time of Quake's release, these user modifications became known as just "mods".

== Quake ==
Modding was made easy for Quake players, who could download level editors and the QuakeC programming language to make their own mods and content. The accessibility of QuakeC led to a new paradigm of mod creations. Most player creations were team-based games, as players appreciated their strategic and cooperative elements. Among the first successful mods were Capture the Flag and Team Fortress. The mod community and their websites, such as PlanetQuake Featured Mods, became a place for aspiring game programmers and artists to train. Valve recruited its first employees from the Quake modding community, as the Team Fortress team was invited to create its sequel for Valve's first game, Half-Life, itself built on modifications of the Quake II game engine.

In 1997, a "total conversion" Quake mod named "Alien Quake" replaced characters, levels, and sounds with replacements from the Alien film franchise. Its developers received a takedown notice from 20th Century Fox, which they posted on their website. The producer's forceful response to a fan effort coined the term "Foxed".

Id's choice to create and share an editor and scripting language with Quake spurred its modding community and led to unforeseen innovations, such as animated movies performed by players during gameplay. Rock, Paper, Shotgun referred to this time as the "Silver Age of FPS modding" for the modder attention to hyper-realistic and polished detail in creating game assets that bordered the production quality of AAA developers.

There have been two attempts to create free content game data for Quake similar to OpenArena or Freedoom. The first, Open Quartz, was started in 2000 and the second LibreQuake, was established in 2019.

=== Machinima ===
The art of using video games to create narrative videos rather than gameplay rose from the "Quake movie" community and became known as machinima. Players of Quake and Quake II created programs to alter the game's demo files, which contained records of the game's user input and events. The actors would control their characters live—creating the demo file—and editors would "re-cam" by revisiting the scene from a new point of view or swapping between pre-selected camera angles. The Quake tools created for these purposes led to dedicated machinima post-production utilities, such as David "CRT" Wright's Keygrip and Keygrip2. The rise of machinima was enabled by the choice of developers such as Id to release easily accessible code and tools to alter it. Even as more advanced tools were produced, players opted to their own homegrown tools and retain the "Quake movie"-style production as their own user-generated process.

== Quake II ==
Among the most popular Quake II mods was Chaos Deathmatch by Chaotic Dream Group. Quetoo is a free software reimplementation of the game's deathmatch.

Multiple shareware level editors were created for the game. A programmer frustrated with the game's QuakeEd level editor released his own version for free and was later offered a job by Id's John Carmack. Robert Duffy modified the game's editing tool into a package called QeRadiant. Another example is Qoole.

== Quake III ==
In 2000, Id transferred maintenance control of the Quake III Arena level editor tools (Q3Radiant) to community programmers, who added new features and released the result as the Windows- and Linux-compatible GtkRadiant. A public beta test ran in January 2001. It became one of Quake's most used level editors and was later released under the GNU General Public License.

== Quake engine tools ==
=== Qoole ===
Qoole, short for Quake Object Oriented Level Editor, is a level editor for video games based on the Quake engine, and was developed by Lithium Software in 1996. Among the supported games are the original Quake I and Quake II, Hexen II and Half-Life. It uses a brush-based method to construct new maps, in which monsters, items and lights can be placed, or any of the on-board prefabs. It was originally sold on a CD-ROM, but the source code was eventually released under the GPL v2.

=== QuArK ===
QuArK is a free and open-source program for Quake engine-based games. It has the ability to edit maps, and can import, export, manipulate and convert models, sounds, textures and various other game assets.

=== Other tools ===
- TrenchBroom – a map editor for Quake engine-based games.
- PakExpl – used for opening the .pak files that carry Quake's model, sound, and level data, as well as the progs.dat file.
- fteqccgui – used to open the progs.dat file in order to edit the quakec files that control entity behavior.
- qME 3.1 – the final version of the Quake model editing tool, can be used to convert traditional 3d model files into Quake's .mdl format.
- qPAK – another tool for opening Quake .pak archives, it comes bundled with qME.

== See also ==
- Doom modding
- Timothee Besset
