= Jazz Jackrabbit 2 =

1998 video game

- Developer: Epic MegaGames
- Publishers: Windows: WW: Gathering of Developers; JP: P&A; UK: Black Friar; EU: Project Two Interactive; Classic Mac OS: NA: Logicware
- Producers: Robert A. Allen; Cliff Bleszinski
- Designers: Nick Stadler; Cliff Bleszinski
- Programmers: Arjan Brussee; Michiel van der Leeuw
- Artist: Nick Stadler
- Composer: Alexander Brandon
- Series: Jazz Jackrabbit
- Platforms: Windows, Classic Mac OS
- Release: Windows: EU: May 7, 1998; NA: August 12, 1998; NA: November 6, 1998 (Holiday Hare '98); EU: March 15, 1999 (The Secret Files); EU: November 25, 1999 (The Christmas Chronicles); Mac: NA: February 3, 1999; EU: 1999
- Genre: Side-scrolling platform game
- Modes: Single-player, multiplayer

Jazz Jackrabbit 2 is a 1998 platform game produced by Epic MegaGames. It was released for Windows, and later for Macintosh. Like the first game, Jazz Jackrabbit, Jazz Jackrabbit 2 is a side-scrolling platform game but features additional multiplayer options, including the ability to play over a LAN or the Internet. The game was re-released on GOG.com along with the first game on November 30, 2017.

== Gameplay ==
Just like its predecessor, Jazz Jackrabbit 2 is a 2D side-scroller that incorporates elements of shooting and platforming. The player must venture through a series of levels populated with enemies and environmental hazards that may hinder the player's progress. The goal is to reach the level's exit, usually indicated by an exit sign, whilst overcoming obstacles and hazards through the use of running and jumping as well as removing enemies and obstructions through the use of shooting and stomping.

The player is given a selection of characters to choose from, namely, Jazz, Spaz, and eventually (in the subsequent expansions) Lori. Each character has certain traits that are exclusive to them. For an example, Jazz can launch himself vertically higher than others, Spaz can double jump, and Lori can dash through enemies. Each Character is equipped with a gun that can fire an inexhaustible supply of projectiles in a straight manner. However, the player can encounter additional ammunition that can provide greater fire-power and range but with limiting ammo. These ammo types can result in different weapon behaviors such as a flamethrower, freeze ray, and explosives.

In addition to ammo, players will usually come across certain items and power-ups to aid the player. Some of these may include a 1-up that gives the player an extra life, a massive variety of food that when enough is collected gives the player a short period of invincibility in the form of a "sugar rush", a variety of diamonds that when enough is collected gives the player an extra life, a carrot that boosts the player's health, a bird in a cage that once is liberated will follow the player while automatically firing at any nearby enemy until the player takes damage, and rapid fire which decreases the delay between shots with every pick up without the player being required to rapidly tap the fire button, although, this power up will reset itself every time the player loses a life.

Also scattered throughout the levels are coins to collect. These are used as currency for when one encounters the merchant. If enough coins are collected, the merchant will teleport the player to a secret location in the level that is usually filled with power-ups and other goodies.

=== Multiplayer ===
The game's split-screen mode supports up to four players, whereas online can support up to 32. The game also has local TCP/IPX network support. There are five multiplayer game modes: Cooperative (where players work together in the game's single-player campaign), Battle (basically a deathmatch), Race (in which the first to complete all laps wins), Treasure Hunt (in which the first to collect 100 diamonds and find the exit wins the match), and Capture the Flag.

== Plot ==
Devan Shell builds a time machine to rewrite history and eliminate hares. He steals Jazz and Eva's wedding ring to complete the machine. Jazz chases his nemesis Devan Shell through time, in order to retrieve the ring. When his plans fail, Devan unleashes demons from Hell and also transforms into a demon. Jazz manages to defeat Devan, takes the ring and finally marries Eva.

== Development ==
Jazz Jackrabbit 2 was produced by Epic MegaGames, now known as Epic Games, as the sequel to Jazz Jackrabbit. It was accidentally confirmed in August 1994 by Arjan Brussee. It was released in 1998 for PCs running Windows, and later for Macintosh computers.

Jazz Jackrabbit 2 has a bundled level editor called Jazz Creation Station (JCS), allowing players to create their own levels. The level editor was not included in the Mac versions or shareware editions.

== Releases ==
There were several variants and releases of Jazz Jackrabbit 2.

Jazz Jackrabbit 2: Shareware Edition

Released on April 10, 1998, this is a promotional shareware game. It featured three single-player levels and two multiplayer levels. It was released to promote the game. The three single-player levels from the Shareware Edition were later included in the commercial release of the game.

Jazz Jackrabbit 2: Holiday Hare '98

This Christmas edition was released on November 6, 1998 for the PC in North America. Unlike the previous holiday editions, this game is commercial rather than shareware. It includes three single-player levels as well as a new boss and additional multiplayer levels.

Jazz Jackrabbit 2: The Secret Files

This Easter edition was released on March 15, 1999 for the PC in Europe (with a subsequent release in Poland by LK Avalon on June 19 which added Polish language in the options). This game introduces Jazz's sister Lori as another playable character. When Lori dies, her face is immolated and she falls over. It also adds an extra episode to the original Jazz Jackrabbit 2, called The Secret Files. This episode consists of three different zones, each one with three levels. New tiles are also added to The Secret Files, most of them from the first Jazz Jackrabbit. The LK Avalon release can be found in the GOG.com re-release.

Jazz Jackrabbit 2: The Secret Files Shareware Edition

Released in 1999, this is a shareware game to promote The Secret Files. It is identical to the standard shareware version, but it includes the ability to play as Lori, as well as two new single-player levels in addition to the standard shareware version's levels.

Jazz Jackrabbit 2: The Christmas Chronicles

This Christmas edition is an enhanced version of Holiday Hare '98, featuring Lori as a playable character. It was going to be released on November 25, 1999 for the PC across Europe, but the publisher, Project Two Interactive, went bankrupt before the release date. It was eventually released in Poland by LK Avalon. A limited European release followed shortly after. This version is based on the engine of The Secret Files and can be found in the GOG.com re-release.

== Reception ==
Reception

Review scores
Publication	Score
CNET Gamecenter	8/10
Computer Games Strategy Plus	3.5/5
Computer Gaming World	2.5/5
GamePro	4.5/5
GameSpot	8.5/10
Hyper	75%
Jeuxvideo.com	18/20
MacLife	(Mac) "Spiffy"
Next Generation	1/5
PC Gamer (US)	84%
PC PowerPlay	65%
PC Zone	71%
The Cincinnati Enquirer	3.5/5
USA Today	4/4
Hacker	90%

Jazz Jackrabbit 2 received positive reviews. MacADDICT's reviewer John Lee praised the Mac version's fluent gameplay, but criticised it for not adding anything new to the genre, which he considered "old fashioned". Trevor Covert of MacNN described the gameplay as "addicting" and praised the graphics, but Next Generation called the PC version "unimpressive". PC Zone gave the same PC version an above-average review over a month before its European release date.

The game sold 29,000 units in the U.S. by October 2001. Despite good reviews, sales were insufficient and resulted in some financial loss for Gathering of Developers.
