= The Palace of Deceit =

1991 video game

- Developer(s): Game Syndicate Productions
- Publisher(s): InnerVision Software
- Designer(s): Cliff Bleszinski
- Platform(s): MS-DOS, Windows 3
- Release: 1991: MS-DOS; Aug 31, 1992: Windows
- Genre(s): Adventure
- Mode(s): Single-player

Palace of Deceit is a video game written by Cliff Bleszinski in 1991 in his own company, Game Syndicate Productions, at the age of 16. The first edition, subtitled The Secret of Castle Lockemoer, was a text adventure for MS-DOS. On August 31, 1992, it was remade for Windows 3.x and subtitled The Dragon's Plight as a graphical point-and-click adventure game with an entirely new plot and graphics. Both games are played in a first-person perspective and have been released as freeware. Bleszinski's inspiration came from video games like Déjà Vu and Uninvited.

== The Secret of Castle Lockemoer ==
In the original game, the player plays the role of a man from the future brought to the medieval past by a good wizard to enter the castle Lockemoer and destroy the Evil Wizard. The game is a text adventure which occasionally uses graphics created using ASCII.

== The Dragon's Plight ==
In this remake, the player is the dragon Nightshade, captured by the evil wizard Garth and thrown into the dungeons. Nightshade seeks a way out of the castle and a way to destroy Garth for his campaign to wipe out dragonkind from the land of Salac. The game is a point-and-click adventure similar to Shadowgate and Déjà Vu, but lacks music and sound. Nightshade can die in certain encounters, forcing the player to restart or reload a save file. The game was coded in Visual Basic and the graphics created using Microsoft Paintbrush.
