= Jazz Jackrabbit (1994 video game) =

- Developer: Epic MegaGames
- Publisher: Epic MegaGames
- Producers: Mark Rein; Tim Sweeney
- Designers: Robert A. Allen; Cliff Bleszinski; Arjan Brussee
- Programmer: Arjan Brussee
- Artist: Nick Stadler
- Composer: Robert A. Allen
- Series: Jazz Jackrabbit
- Platform: MS-DOS
- Release: WW: August 1, 1994; Jazz Jackrabbit CD: WW: November 28, 1994; Holiday Hare '94: WW: December 15, 1994; Holiday Hare '95: WW: November 17, 1995
- Genre: Platform
- Mode: Single-player

Jazz Jackrabbit is a 1994 platform game developed and published by Epic MegaGames. It was released for MS-DOS-based computers. The game was re-released on GOG.com along with Jazz Jackrabbit 2 on November 30, 2017, with support for Windows, macOS, and Linux.

== Gameplay ==
Jazz shooting at an enemy on Diamondus level; the yellow stars indicate temporary invincibility.

Jazz Jackrabbit is a 2D platform game. Gameplay mechanics in Jazz are very similar to Zool's, with the exception of not being able to destroy the enemies by simply jumping at them (which was not added until the second game). Jazz will run faster and jump higher the longer he runs, avoiding chasms that might lead to harmful objects. Unlike other platform games, however, there are no abysses and every level bifurcates into subsections that might lead to valuable items (such as weapon pick-ups, score items, etc.) while the direction of general progression is hinted at with occasional arrows. Jazz has a health bar that changes in colour based on how much health Jazz has remaining. Jazz can withstand a limited number of hits (5 on Easy mode, 4 on Medium mode, 3 on Hard or Turbo mode) from harmful objects before losing a life; one hit's worth of health can be restored by picking up a carrot. Lives can also be accumulated to the maximum number of ten. When killed, Jazz starts from the level beginning or at any checkpoint sign that had been reached and shot before.

Items that the player can pick up usually resemble food, computer hardware components or other familiar shapes, and give 100 score points each. There are also several beneficial pick-ups in the game: a "force shield" that protects Jazz from one or four hits, a Hip Hop that shoots enemies, a hoverboard that allows flight, rapid fire/super jump bonuses, a temporary "speed-up" and invincibility, as well as extra lives. Weapons also vary in numbers and consistency and include (besides the Blaster) Bouncer, Toaster, RF Missile, and TNT sets. Large sets of ammunition can only be collected by being shot from their enclosure.

The first game has a timer that starts a number of minutes at the beginning of each level (9 minutes and 59 seconds on Easy mode, 8 minutes on Medium, 6 minutes on Hard, and 4 minutes on Turbo) and counts down to zero; on Hard and Turbo, another countdown appears at the top of the screen when there is less than a minute left, and if time expires, Jazz loses a life. If Jazz reaches and shoots the finish sign before time runs out, the player is then provided with additional score points awarded for the remaining time and a perfect score if he picks up all items and/or deals with all enemies. If Jazz finishes the area with a big red diamond, he gets to enter the bonus stage. In these stages, animation switches to a pseudo-3D (third-person shooter) of Jazz as he runs on a speedway with the purpose of gathering as many blue diamonds as requested before time runs out, while obstacles try to stop him or slow him down. If the task is accomplished successfully, the player is provided with an extra life.

Jazz in his lizard form

Aside from bonuses, Jazz also features secret levels that can be accessed in specific areas of other levels once in every episode. Secret level signs feature the question mark instead of Devan's head portrait that must be shot. The current level is then considered completed and the secret level embarks. Levels themselves consist of an enormous "grant" area with numerous weapons and items to pick up. One level, however, features a mini-boss, while the player assumes control of Jazz in his sidekick bird form. Secret levels also feature a count-up upon completion that provides the player with extra score points.

== Plot ==
The game is set in a fantasy world based on Aesop's "The Tortoise and the Hare", in which the enmity between tortoises and hares continues even after three thousand years. An evil mastermind tortoise named Devan Shell begins conquering planets, suppressing any native confrontation. One of such planets, Carrotus, is home to a peaceful hare kingdom that, once confronted by Shell, is able to provide enough resistance to fend him off. Enraged by his loss, Devan decides to kidnap Carrotus princess Eva Earlong and hide her on a distant airbase of unknown location to use as ransom. In response, the king chooses to send Carrotus' hero Jazz Jackrabbit, a green hare with a blue LFG-2000 gun, to various planets conquered by Devan that might contain clues to the location of Eva's imprisonment. As Jazz travels through different worlds, he gains new weapons and meets new enemies in his pursuit to rescue the princess and save Carrotus from Devan Shell and his army of Turtle Terrorists.

Jazz manages to find the secret airbase but Devan escapes with Eva. Jazz later finds Devan's cloning machine. In the end Jazz stops two battleships sent by Devan to attack Carrotus and finds the location of the princess, but Devan escapes.

== Levels ==
The game was originally divided into six episodes. Each episode has three planets, with every planet itself consisting of two levels. Each episode has an additional secret level (in the first the players control bird Hip Hop and in later regular Jazz). The final level of every episode features a boss that the player must deal with in order to complete the level. Episodes are tied by a single storyline usually progressing after each episode is finished.

A CD-ROM version titled "Jazz Jackrabbit CD" was released on November 28, 1994, containing all six original episodes, as well as 3 additional ones known as "The Lost Episodes" listed as episodes A, B, and C. In episode C, there is a secret level with Jazz in the form of a lizard.

A shareware Christmas edition titled Jazz Jackrabbit: Holiday Hare 1994 was released on December 15, 1994, with a special 3-level holiday-themed episode. Subsequent pressings of the CD-ROM edition added "Holiday Hare" as episode X, bringing the total episode count to 10.

Another shareware Christmas edition titled Jazz Jackrabbit: Holiday Hare 1995 was released on November 17, 1995, with another holiday episode with two new planets.

Designation	Episodes	Planets
1	Turtle Terror	Diamondus, Tubelectric, Medivo
2	Ballistic Bunny	Letni, Technoir, Orbitus
3	Rabbits Revenge	Fanolint, Scraparap, Megairbase
4	Gene Machine	Turtemple, Nippius, Jungrock
5	The Chase is On	Marbelara, Sluggion, Dreempipes
6	The Final Clash	Pezrock, Crysilis, Battleships
A	Outta Dis World	Exoticus, Industrius, Muckamok
B	Turtle Soup	Raneforus, Stonar, Deckstar
C	Wild Wabbit	Ceramicus, Deserto, Lagunicus
X	Holiday Hare 1994	Holidaius
X	Holiday Hare 1995	Candion, Bloxonius

== Development ==
Jazz Jackrabbit was coded by Arjan Brussee and designed by Cliff Bleszinski for Epic MegaGames. It was greatly inspired by the Amiga game Zool and the ongoing success of video game classics (such as Sonic the Hedgehog and Mega Man) defining the platform game genre in the 1990s market, and was initially considered to be a pastiche of Sega's Sonic the Hedgehog in the computer world. The game did not manage to reach the popularity of Sonic, but did acquire a sizable audience due to its fast-paced gameplay and advanced graphics. The game's audio was implemented using an interactive music system called "Cybersound Music System".

== Legacy ==
A sequel named Jazz Jackrabbit 2 was released in 1998, as well as a reboot on Game Boy Advance in 2002. The commercial success of the game kickstarted the career of its co-creator, Cliff Bleszinski, who would later be a key force behind Epic Games' Unreal and Gears of War.
