= Level editor =

Game development tool

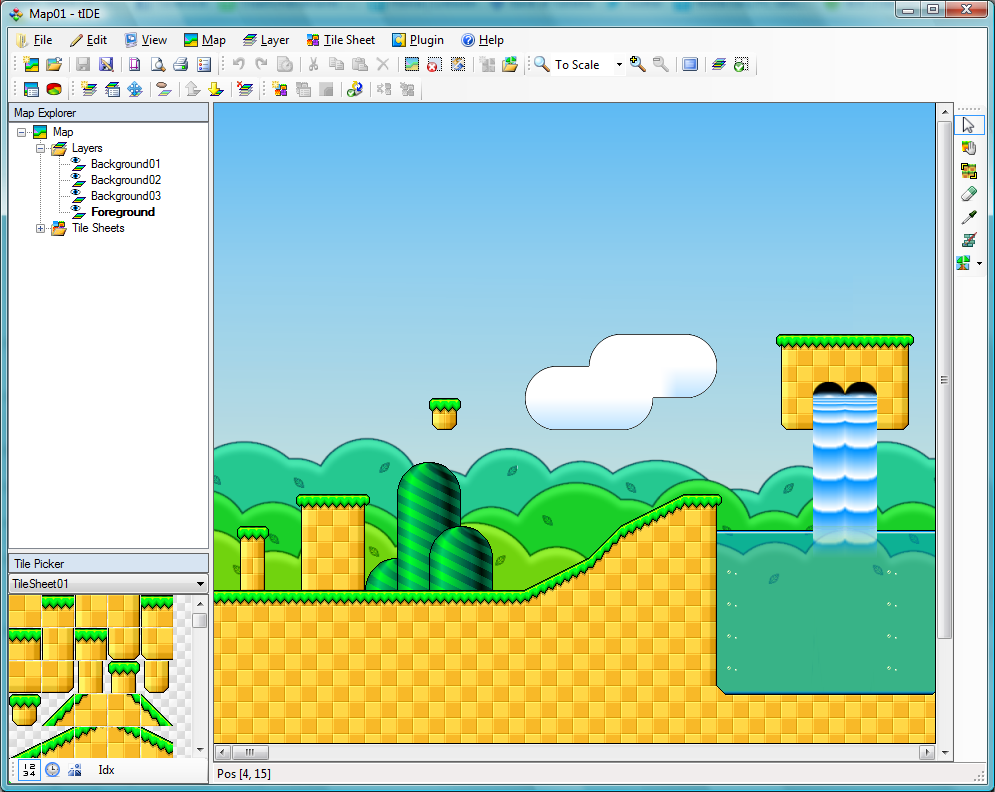
TIDE, a 2D level editor, showing tiles for a side-scrolling video game

A level editor (also known as a map, campaign or scenario editor; alternately, a track editor for racing games) is a game development tool used to design levels, maps, campaigns and virtual worlds for a video game. An individual involved with the development of game levels is a level designer or mapper.

Official level editors are typically made to assist game development or to allow for greater player creativity, while fan-made editors are usually created for easier modding. Level editors vary in complexity; editors used in game development are usually more difficult and extensive than those made with players in mind.

Modern level editors often allow to upload created levels online and play other uploaded user-made levels. Level editors often have a substantial effect on the game's longevity.

== History ==
"Dungeon Editor" in Dandy for the Atari 8-bit computers

Lode Runner (1983) is one of the earliest examples of games with a level editor. The idea of a level editor was conceived due to a lack of programming experience of James Bratsanos, a friend of the game's lead programmer and designer Douglas E. Smith. In a 2010 interview, game designer John Romero claimed that Smith added the level-editing function at the request of neighborhood kids he had testing the game, and "a ton" of the levels they designed ended up in the final game. Other early level editors were featured in Dandy (1983) and Excitebike (1984).

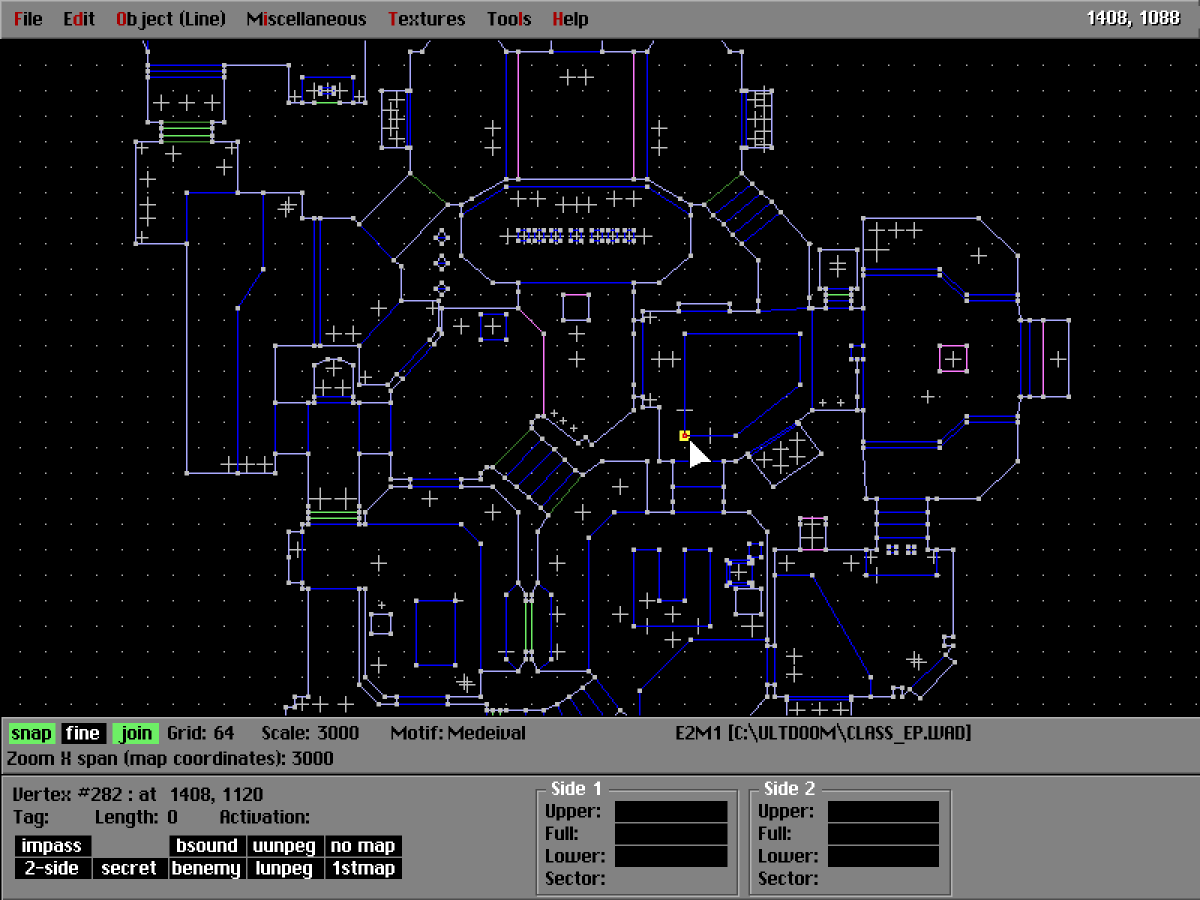
Doom Construction Kit, one of the first Doom level editors, released in 1994

Doom (1993) became one of the first 3D games which became popular partially due to third-party level editors, which led to the formation of an online community sharing fan-made Doom mods. Developer id Software embraced the modding scene, packaging mods TNT: Evilution and The Plutonia Experiment as an official expansion Final Doom, releasing Doom's source code under a free license for easier modding and porting, and adding a built-in mod browser in Doom + Doom II, a remaster of the first two games. Since the popularity of Doom, other third-party level editors for various games were released, such as QuArK for Quake.

In 2008, LittleBigPlanet was released, featuring a robust level editor and an ability to share levels online. (Note: The online servers for LittleBigPlanet have been shut down on 13 September 2021.) Unlike other games with a level editor, where it was featured as a side mode, the editor in LittleBigPlanet was the main selling point. The game was universally acclaimed for its amount of content and the unique approach to user-generated content. Later games in the LittleBigPlanet series expanded the formula, adding more features to the editor.

Since the late 2000s, an increasing number of games with a level editor also featured a way to share them online via in-game services or external dedicated websites, like Steam Workshop. On these services, users are able to download other people's levels and, in some cases, rate them based on their perceived quality.

In 2015, Nintendo released Super Mario Maker, another game with a level editor as the main focus of the game. The editor was designed to be accessible and easy to understand. Users could upload their levels online and play other people's levels, as well as vote for (like) or against (boo) them. (Note: New levels could not be uploaded after 31 March 2021. Super Mario Maker's online services were shut down on 8 April 2024, making online levels inaccessible.) The level editor was praised for being intuitive and easy to understand, while still allowing to create unique levels. Later games with level editors are often influenced by and compared to Super Mario Maker. In 2019, Nintendo released Super Mario Maker 2, a sequel to the first game with even more features.

== Characteristics ==
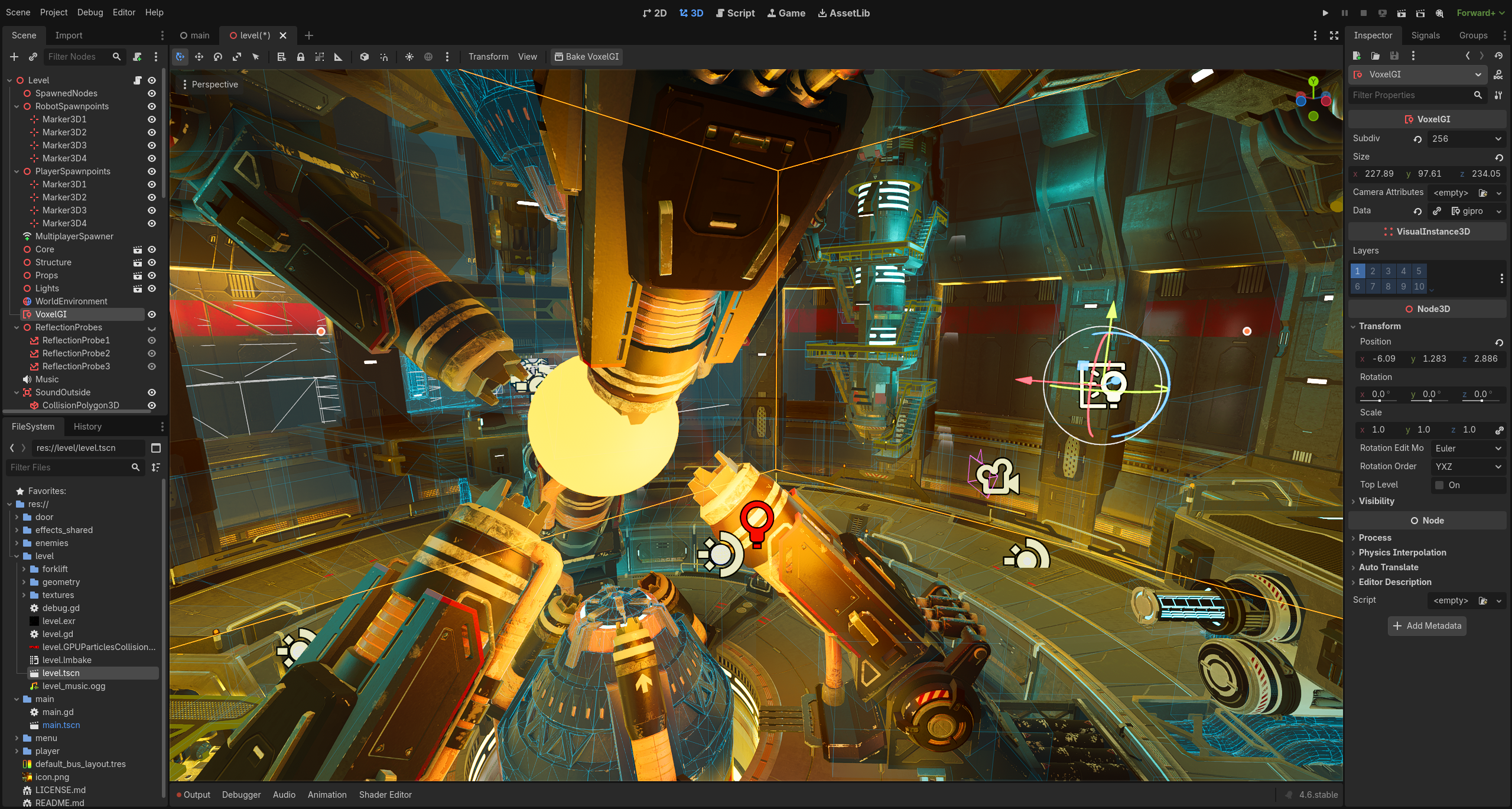
Level editor in Godot

The developer of a video game may include built-in level editing tools; for example, a track editor for a racing game, or release an official level editor for the game as a separate application. In cases where the game doesn't have an official level editor, players of the game develop fan-made editors, such as Lunar Magic for Super Mario World. Level editors are present extensively in video game integrated development environments, such as Godot, Unity, or Unreal Engine.

Most in-game level editors impose object limits to prevent performance issues, crashes, and exploits. This is especially prevalent in editors available on game consoles, such as Halo's Forge.

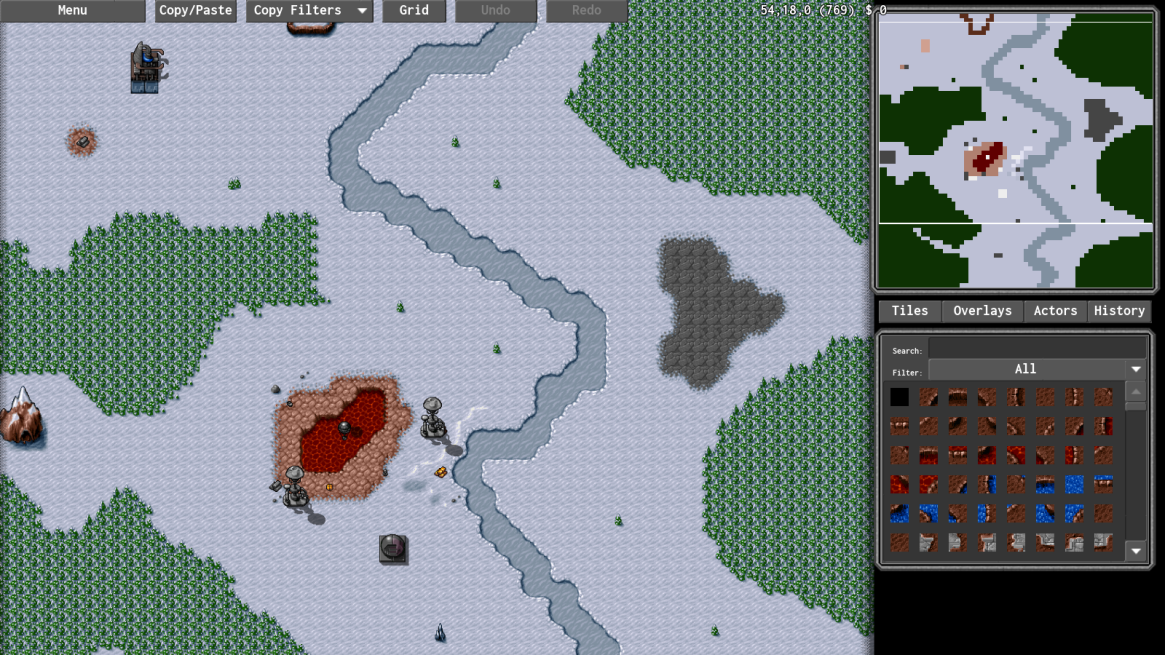
OpenHV's top-down map editor is a simple to understand grid-based editor.

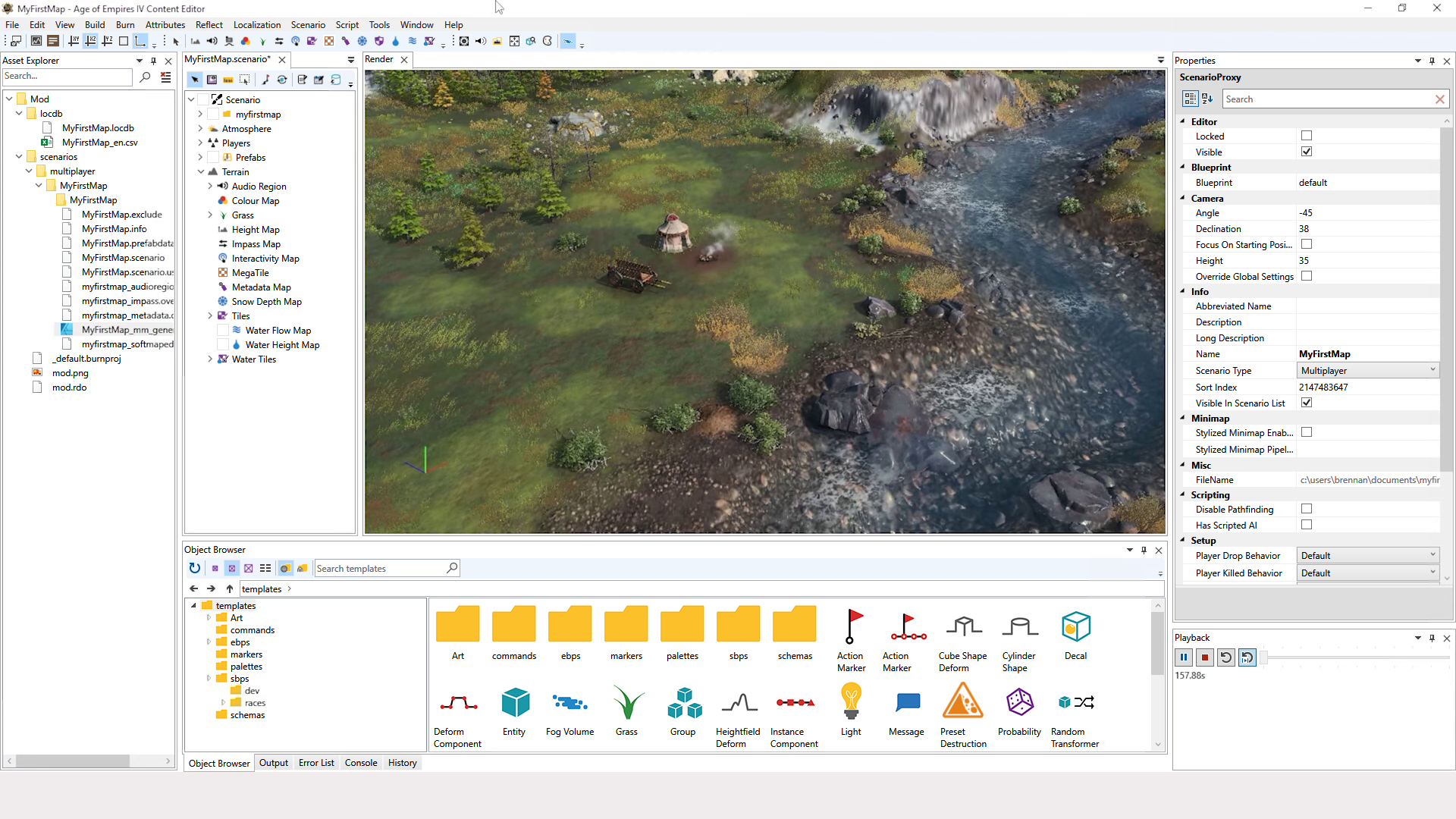
Age of Empires IV's level editor is significantly more complex, but gives user more options.

The complexity of a game's level editor and the number of available options given to the player are usually proportional. Simplified editors, such as Portal 2's built-in chamber editor, are more accessible and easy to understand to an average player, but offer limited creative freedom compared to professional map development tools, such as Valve's Hammer Editor, which also comes with Portal 2 and requires significant expertise from the user.

While in most games level editors are an additional feature, certain games have the level editor as the main feature of the game, such as Super Mario Maker and LittleBigPlanet. Some games, like Dreams and Game Builder Garage, allow users to make their own assets and develop custom logic, effectively functioning as game creation systems.

Most modern games with level editors allow creators to upload their levels online, which are then able to be played by other people. To upload a level, there is usually a requirement to beat the level beforehand, preventing impossible levels to be uploaded.

=== 2D level editors ===
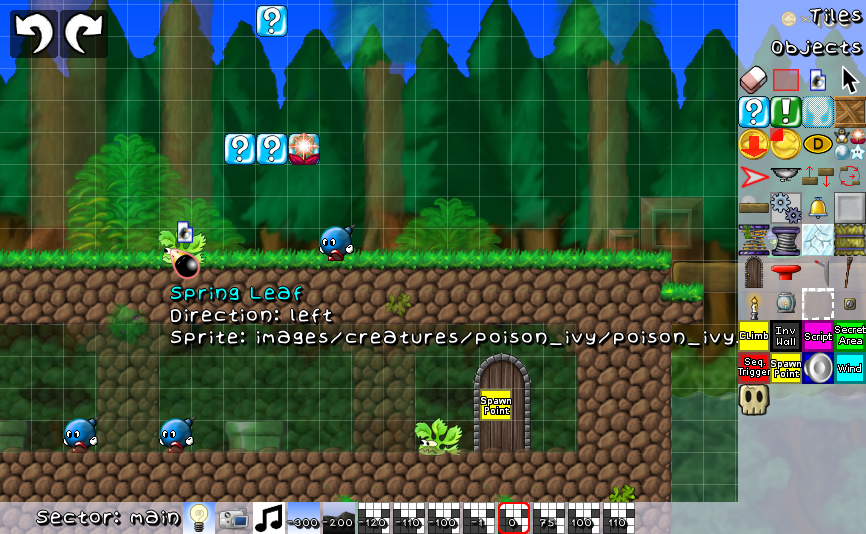
Level editor in SuperTux; blocks and entities are placed on a visible grid.

Level editors are most often present in two-dimensional tile-based video games, typically featuring a square grid on which level elements are placed. These editors often provide drag-and-drop functionality along with tools for moving, deleting, and adjusting properties of objects. Similar to various graphics software, layering may also be used to separate overlapping objects.

=== 3D level editors ===
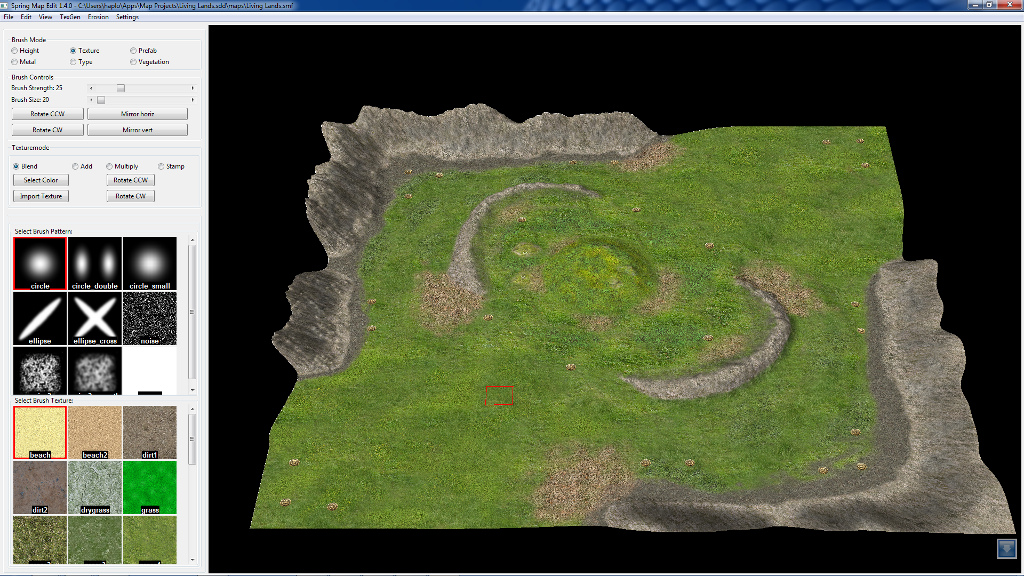
3D level editor for Spring with terrain morphing features

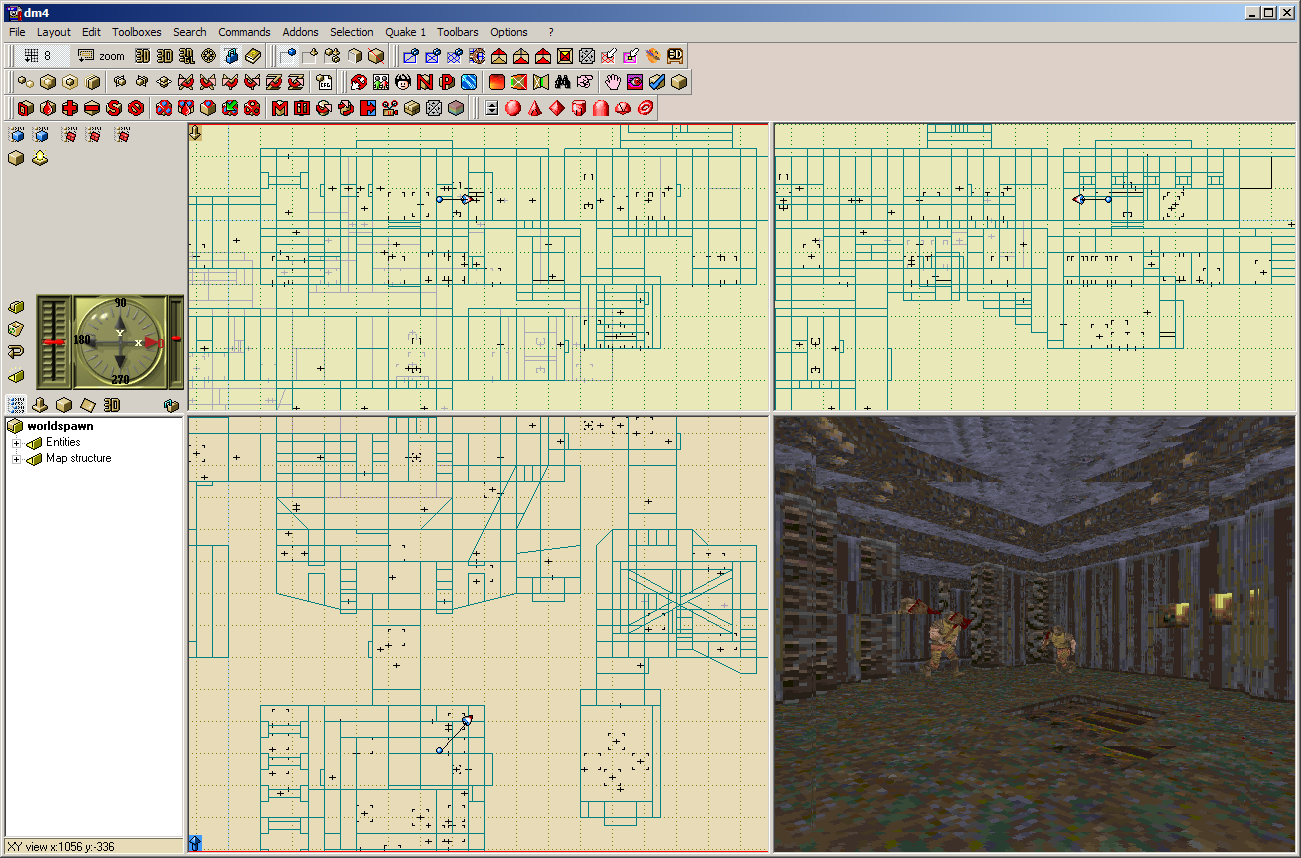
QuArK editor, showing three orthographic projections and 3D view

Three-dimensional level editors are usually reserved for game development; user-friendly 3D editors are far less common, because of the increased complexity required to build in three dimensions, as well as to program such level editor. 3D editors typically have a virtual camera that can be moved freely to view the level. Early 3D editors sometimes displayed orthographic projections of the level on each axis; this was used to precisely place brushes.

== Impact ==
The presence of a level editor in a video game can often increase its longevity and prolong the game's popularity. Various news sources report that Portal 2 continued to receive new community maps made in the game's chamber editor even after 13 years since the game's release in 2011. Released in 2013, Geometry Dash was a modest success at launch, but the game's community has been steadily growing since then, partly because of the online levels created by players. Super Mario Maker 2 has received over two million levels in the first eleven days after the game's release; this has then increased to 26 million by 3 May 2021.

== See also ==
- List of level editors
- End-user development
- Low-code development platform
- No-code development platform
- Video game modding
- Visual programming language
