= Boss Key Productions =

American video game developer

Boss Key Productions, Inc.
- Type: Private
- Industry: Video games
- Founded: April 30, 2014; 12 years ago
- Founders: Cliff Bleszinski; Arjan Brussee
- Defunct: May 14, 2018; 8 years ago
- Fate: Dissolved
- Headquarters: Raleigh, North Carolina, US
- Key people: Cliff Bleszinski (CEO)
- Products: LawBreakers
- Number of employees: 65 (2017)

Boss Key Productions, Inc. was an American video game developer based in Raleigh, North Carolina. Founded in April 2014 by Cliff Bleszinski and Arjan Brussee, formerly of Epic Games, the company developed LawBreakers (2017) and Radical Heights (2018), both of which were commercial failures, effectively leading to the closure of the development team in May 2018.

== History ==
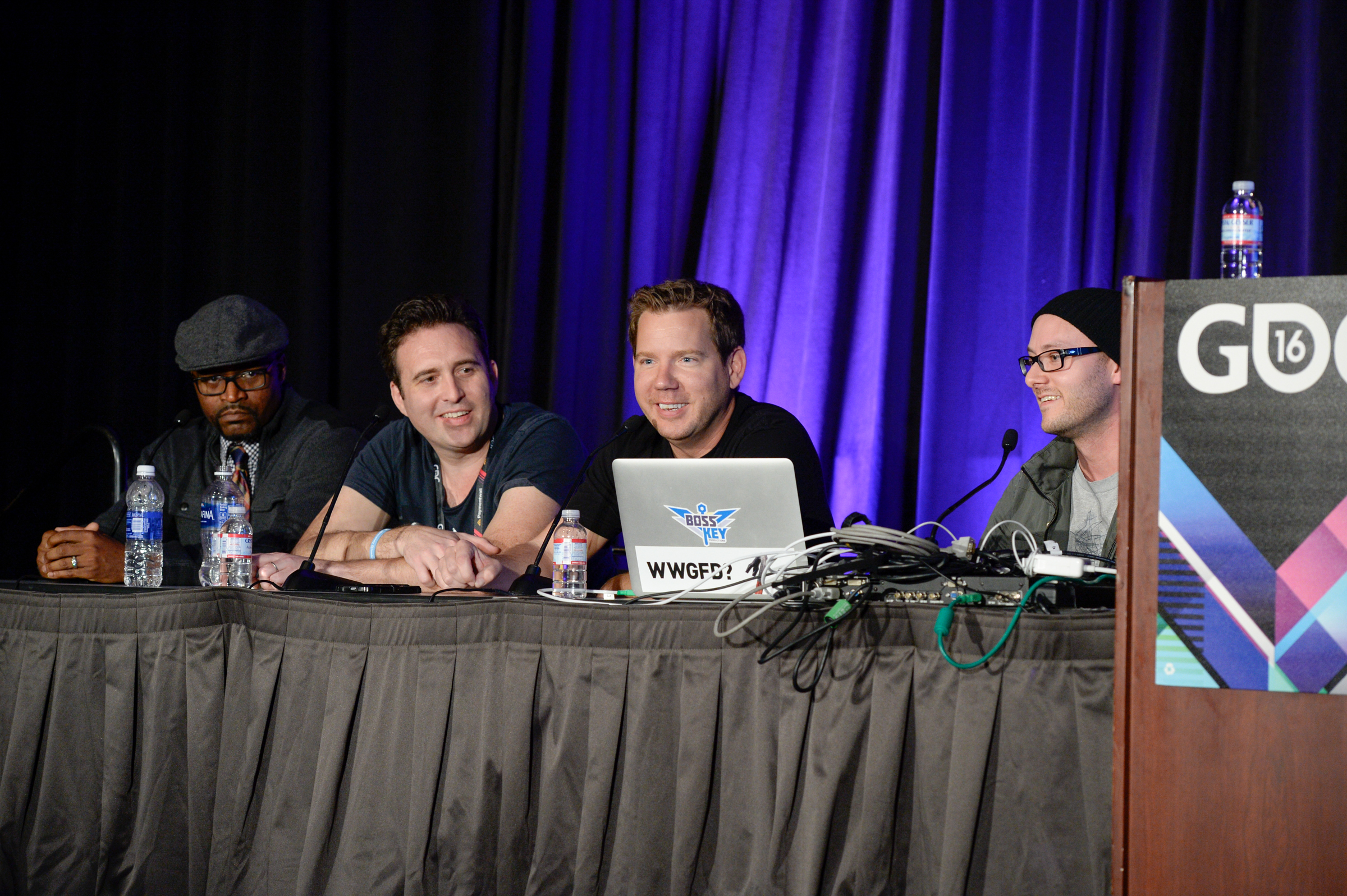
Boss Key Productions at the 2016 Game Developers Conference

Boss Key Productions was founded by former Epic Games employees Cliff Bleszinski and Arjan Brussee, in Raleigh, North Carolina, on April 30, 2014. The studio's inception and name were officially revealed on July 4, 2014, with Bleszinski and Brussee helming the establishment as chief executive officer and chief operating officer, respectively. Boss Key Productions' first project was LawBreakers, a first-person shooter for Microsoft Windows and PlayStation 4.

Following the success of the 2014 game Alien: Isolation, Boss Key had been in discussions with 20th Century Fox to make a first-person shooter game set in the Alien franchise, where the player would play as Newt, guided by Ripley, as she fought through xenomorphs in Earth-based labs where they were being studied by the Weyland-Yutani corporation, in a style similar to Half-Life series. However, the project had been shelved as a result of the merger of Fox into Disney.

Although LawBreakers was received positively following its August 2017 release, it underperformed commercially, leading the team to move on to develop a battle royale game instead of supporting LawBreakers in the long term. Subsequently, Brussee left Boss Key Productions in December 2017, announcing that he had returned to Epic Games to work on an "exciting secret project". The battle royale game, titled Radical Heights, was released in April 2018 as a Steam Early Access title, officially dubbed "X-Treme Early Access". The game was received negatively by some critics, due to its very early state, and described as a mere "cash-in" in the light of the popularity of other battle royale games, such as PlayerUnknown's Battlegrounds and Fortnite Battle Royale.

On May 14, 2018, following the overall under-performance of both LawBreakers and Radical Heights, Bleszinski announced via Twitter that Boss Key Productions had shut down. The studio previously had 65 employees as of September 2017. According to Bleszinski, he did not take a salary for two years in order to pay for his employees so they "could care for their families."
