= LawBreakers =

2017 video game

- Developer: Boss Key Productions
- Publisher: Nexon
- Director: Cliff Bleszinski
- Designer: Dan Nanni
- Artist: Tramell Isaac
- Composers: Jason Graves; Jack Wall
- Engine: Unreal Engine 4
- Platforms: Windows; PlayStation 4
- Release: August 8, 2017
- Genres: First-person shooter, hero shooter
- Mode: Multiplayer

LawBreakers was a first-person shooter video game developed by Boss Key Productions and published by Nexon. It was released for PlayStation 4 and Windows on August 8, 2017.

LawBreakers attempted to expand on the traditional FPS approach by introducing low-gravity gameplay and followed the character selection mechanics that are popular in other objective-based FPS games.

Despite generally positive reviews from critics, LawBreakers sold poorly, leading to the game's servers being shut down on September 14, 2018.

== Gameplay ==
Two teams of five players competed against each other to complete the objective of the match, with one side playing as "Law" and the other side playing as the "Breakers". Though each faction featured its own character roster, each Role in the game featured a unique set of weapons, equipment, and playstyle, all of which were the same for each Role in both teams. The gameplay modes included the following:

=== Overcharge ===
A modified capture-the-flag mode with one flag planted in the middle of the map in the form of a battery. Teams raced to grab the battery and then take it back to their base, after which the team with the battery had to defend it until it reached 100%, and then a further 20 seconds, to earn a point. However, the battery kept its charge even after it was stolen, so one team could charge the battery to 99% complete, then the enemy could steal it and take the point after successfully defending the battery at 100% charge. The first team to score three points would be the winners.

=== Uplink ===
Similar to Overcharge, except the battery was replaced with a satellite dish. The upload percentage was not linked to the dish itself, but to the team's progress in defending the uplink.

=== Turf War ===
There were three capture points spread out between each team's side and the center of the map. Each team competed to clear and hold as many points as possible until the maximum score was reached. Once all three points on a map had been locked down, the number of points captured by each team would be added to their total, and the capture points reset to neutral control after 10 seconds. The first team to reach 16 points would win the match. If both teams were tied going into the last round, then an "Overtime" round would be played, during which the first team to capture two of the three points would win the match.

=== Blitzball ===
Both teams raced to acquire the "EURO ball" in the center of the map. The player in possession of the ball then had to run to a goal located in the enemy base to score a point while a 30-second "shot clock" began its countdown. Failure to do so would cause the ball to explode once the shot clock elapsed, killing the ball-carrier. If the ball-carrier was killed before scoring, the ball was dropped and became available to be picked up by anyone. Killing the opponent in possession of the ball and picking up the ball reset the shot clock. If the ball fell off the stage or exploded due to the shot clock, the ball would be reset to the center of the stage. The first team to reach 5 points, or the most points after 15 minutes, would win the match.

=== Occupy ===
One circular capture point was placed at the center of the map. Upon activation, each team raced to hold the point and completely clear the enemy off of the point in order to earn points for them. Every 45 seconds, the capture point would rotate to a different spot on the map and re-activate after a 10-second break. Whichever team accumulated 200 points, or the most total points in 15 minutes, would win the match.

=== Team Deathmatch ===
Each team raced to kill as many opponents as they could. The team that reached the maximum amount of combined kills or the most after the allotted time elapsed would be the winners.

=== Roles ===
Though two factions had separate characters for each Role in the game, the equipment and abilities of each Role were identical. As of "Patch 2.0", teams were limited to two of the same Role in each of them, and no double Roles were allowed in the "Boss Leagues" competitive mode. In addition, all Roles shared the ability to slowly regenerate health after spending 5 seconds outside of combat.

The following table lists the characters by Faction and Role:

Faction	Vanguard	Enforcer	Titan	Assassin	Gunslinger	Juggernaut	Battle Medic	Wraith	Harrier
Law	Maverick	Axel	Bomchelle	Hellion	Abaddon	AEGIS	Tokki	Deadlock	Sunshine
Breakers	Toska-9	Kintaro	Cronos	Kitsune	Faust	Nash	Feng	Helix	Baron

== Development and release ==
Previously named BlueStreak, the game was set to be free-to-play, but in March 2016 Boss Key announced that they had abandoned the format in favor of a paid release. It was designed by Dan Nanni.

After being demoed at the 2016 PAX East gamer festival in Boston, LawBreakers began closed alpha and beta testing. On June 30, 2017, Boss Key released an open beta for Windows on Steam, which lasted until July 5. A second open beta was available from July 28 to 31 for PC and PlayStation 4. The game was released for PC and PS4 on August 8, 2017. Physical editions were distributed by Limited Run Games.

Despite his experience developing games for Xbox consoles, game director Cliff Bleszinski decided to exclude the Xbox One from the initial launch of LawBreakers, citing the complexity of releasing the game across multiple platforms. However, in May 2020, he expressed regret that Xbox players familiar with his work on the Gears of War series were unable to support the game's release.

Similar to the concept of twin films, LawBreakers was developed independent of Blizzard Entertainment's Overwatch, which released the year prior, yet both games were highly similar hero shooters. In his 2022 memoir Control Freak, Bleszinski claimed that the 2014 reveal of Overwatch prompted one Boss Key artist to remark "We are so fucked." While critics differentiated the titles, such as LawBreakers' gameplay being faster and less reliant on ultimate abilities, Bleszinski later attributed the game's commercial failure to being overshadowed by Overwatch.

== Reception ==
Reception

Aggregate score
Aggregator	Score
Metacritic	(PC) 76/100 (PS4) 76/100

Review scores
Publication	Score
Destructoid	8.5/10
Electronic Gaming Monthly	7/10
Game Informer	7.75/10
GameRevolution	4
GameSpot	8/10
GamesRadar+	4.5/5
IGN	7.9/10
PC Gamer (US)	84/100

LawBreakers received "generally favorable" reviews from critics, according to review aggregator website Metacritic. Eurogamer ranked the game 39th on their list of the "Top 50 Games of 2017".

=== Decline ===
Despite positive reviews, the game failed to gain a sufficient player base. According to Githyp, the closed-beta peaked at 7500 players on Steam, followed a month later by an open-beta with 40% fewer players. The game launched with a 60% lower player base than the beta peak and launched outside of the Steam top 100 Most Played Games. In an interview with GameSpot, game director Cliff Bleszinski stated that the PlayStation 4 version was doing much better, although he did not confirm any statistics. Bleszinski making the game a PlayStation exclusive on consoles was also criticized as playing a part in the lack of player numbers, with the Xbox being considered to have a wider fanbase for multiplayer first person shooters.

In April 2018, Boss Key released a statement that the game failed to find enough of an audience to generate the funds necessary to keep the game sustained. On June 11, the game was made free-to-play on Steam with a notice that the servers would be shut down on September 14, 2018. The game was removed from Steam and is no longer available for purchase.

In April 2023, Cliff Bleszinski teased a possible revival of LawBreakers after 5 years.
