= Game Titan =

Videogame developer

Game Titan was an American Video Game development studio that was founded in 1999 by Eric Kinkead. They were a small team primarily focused on making handheld games for the Game Boy Advance, operating out of Kinkead's apartment in Austin, Texas. They are mainly known for converting Earthworm Jim to the Game Boy Advance. The studio was shut down in 2005 for unknown reasons.

== Games developed ==
- Frogger 2 (Game Boy Color)
- Earthworm Jim (Game Boy Advance)
- Jazz Jackrabbit (2002, Game Boy Advance)
- Spy Kids Challenger (Game Boy Advance)
- The Cat in the Hat (2005, Game Boy Advance)
