= Noclip.website =

Online video game map viewer

noclip.website
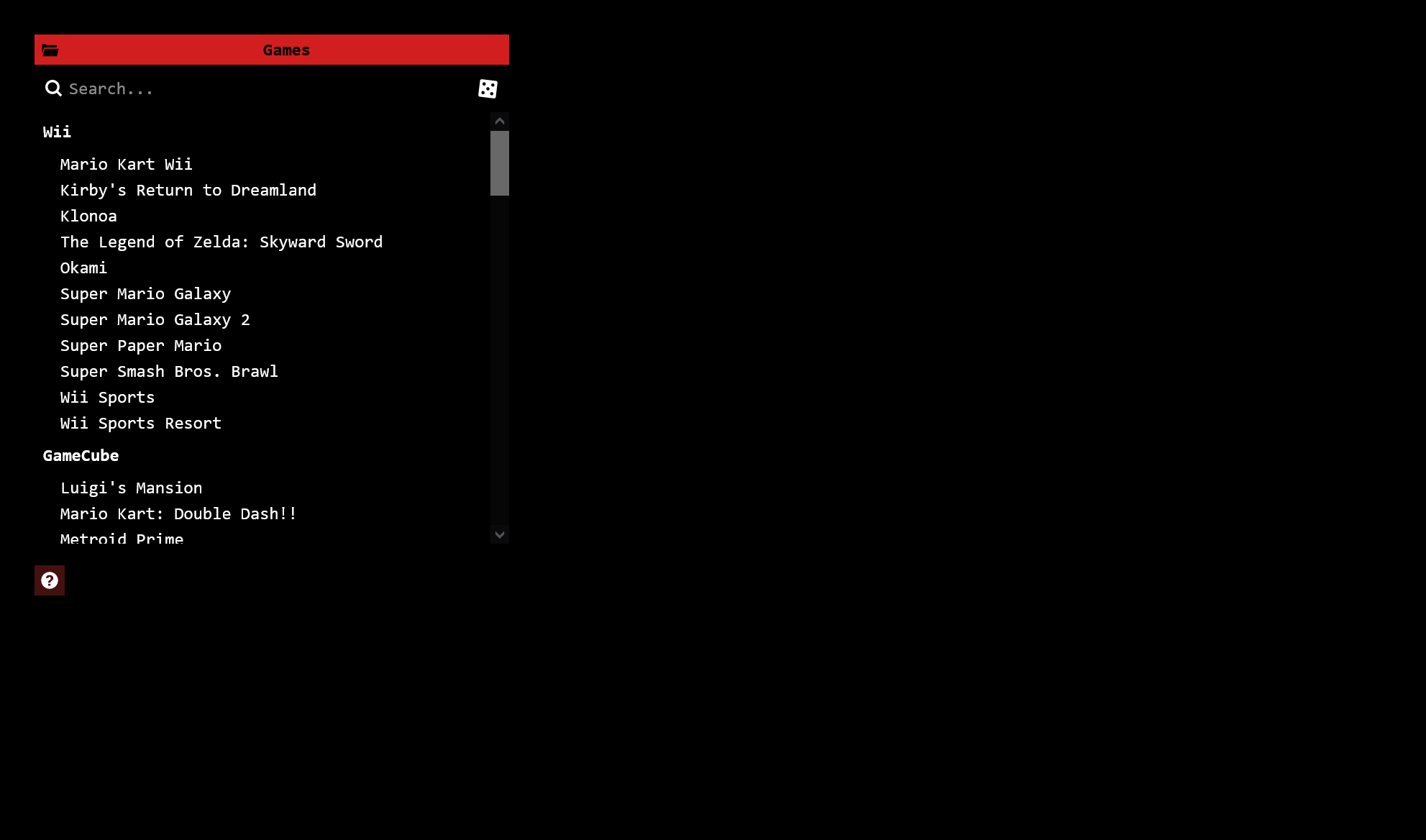
- Screenshot depicting the map viewer's main menu
- Website type: Map viewer
- Owner: JasperRLZ
- Website: noclip.website
- Commercial: No
- Launched: 2018

noclip.website is an online video game map viewer created in 2018, allowing visitors to browse a selection of datamined levels from several games and travel through them in noclip mode without being hindered by walls, objects or gravity. It therefore allows exploration in ways not intended by the game's developers, providing new insights into their layout, development process, and content. The site was programmed by JasperRLZ and a team of contributors, and predominantly features Nintendo games, although it also contains other titles, such as Dark Souls. The site was praised by critics for allowing visitors to explore levels from classic games, and its implementation of bespoke solutions allowing maps from each game to run properly within the same viewer.

== Content ==
noclip.website is open-source software. When visiting the site, a list of levels is presented, and the visitor may select one level at a time to view, navigating it using WASD and mouse controls similar to those of an ingame noclip mode. While most of the levels supported are from Nintendo games, maps from titles such as Psychonauts are viewable in the website.

Due to programming differences in the various video games supported by the site, workarounds had to be created for certain games to allow their maps to be viewed. For example, The Legend of Zelda: The Wind Waker's cel-shaded art style required a unique lighting model to work properly, as well as collision models to prevent plant models from falling through the ground. Some maps allow interaction in order to induce changes in the map; such as Pokémon Snap's levels allowing viewers to throw fruit like in the game in order to unlock new scenarios.

In 2019, JasperRLZ successfully added the maps of Katamari Damacy to the website after offering a $500 bounty for developers to datamine them from the game's code, which had never previously been done. The process was described as difficult due to the files' unclear naming structure in comparison to Nintendo games.

== Reception ==
The site was generally well received by critics, with Matt Leonard of GameRevolution describing it as "a cool way to experience levels from your favorite Nintendo games", although calling it "more exploratory than educational". Dustin Bailey of PCGamesN stated, in regards to the site, that he would "never not appreciate the new perspectives on old games we get from these community projects". Luke Plunkett of Kotaku called the site "very fun", describing exploring the levels as joyful and nostalgic.

Emma Kent of Eurogamer noted that the site provided users with the ability to explore maps from the perspective of a game designer, showing how they were constructed and the illusions used to make them believable. She also expressed the concern that Nintendo would "not be happy" about the site's existence. Ana Diaz of Polygon described the site as a "digital video game museum" and praised the ability to see old games from a new perspective, but criticized some maps as harder to explore than others, singling out Luigi's Mansion as difficult due to the game being set indoors.
