= Japanese Journal of Radiology =

- Language: English
- Edited by: Shinji Naganawa

Publication details
- Publisher: Japan Radiological Society (Japan)
- ISO 4: Find out here

Links
- Journal homepage

The Japanese Journal of Radiology (formerly: Radiation Medicine) is a peer-reviewed journal, officially published by the Japan Radiological Society.

It provides a forum for the publication of papers documenting recent advances and new developments in the field of radiology in medicine and biology.

The journal is a member of the Committee on Publication Ethics.

Editor-in-Chief is Shinji Naganawa.

ISSN: 1867-1071 (print version)

ISSN: 1867-108X (electronic version)
