= Cliff Bleszinski =

American video game designer (born 1975)

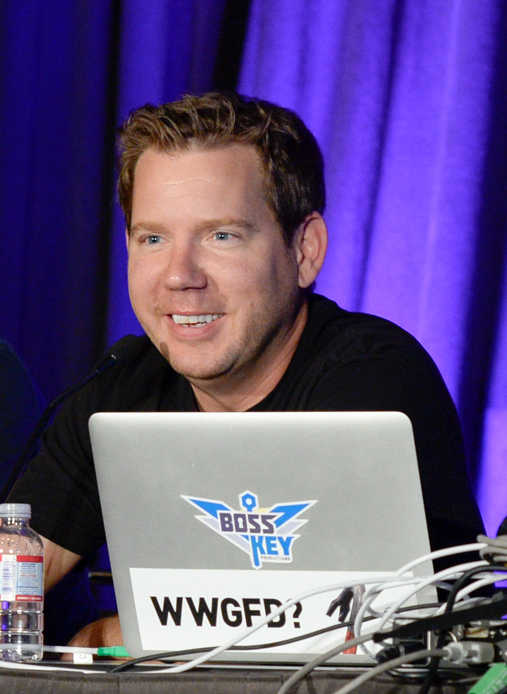
- Bleszinski presenting at the 2016 Game Developers Conference
- Born: February 12, 1975 (age 51); Boston, Massachusetts, U.S.
- Other names: CliffyB, Dude Huge
- Occupation: Game designer
- Spouse: Lauren Bleszinski (m. 2012)

Cliff Bleszinski (/bləˈzɪnski/; born February 12, 1975), popularly known as CliffyB, is an American video game designer, known for his work on the Unreal and Gears of War series while at Epic Games. After leaving Epic in 2012, he co-founded Boss Key Productions in 2014 which closed in 2018 after the commercial failure of the multiplayer shooter LawBreakers. Since Boss Key's closure, Bleszinski has spent his time with theater and writing.

== Career ==
Bleszinski's first game was The Palace of Deceit, an adventure title he started at the age of 15. Programmed in Visual Basic, its second version came out when he was 16.

=== Epic Games (1992–2012) ===
Bleszinski got his start at Epic Games in 1992, after submitting his game Dare to Dream to the company's CEO, Tim Sweeney. Though Dare to Dream did not achieve a great success, it led Bleszinski to work on Jazz Jackrabbit, a platformer co-developed by demoscene coder Arjan Brussee. The title, which came out in 1994, became Epic's biggest selling game at the time, earning him enough money to buy his first apartment and car. It was also around this time that he joined Sweeney and James Schmalz on what would become Unreal, which received a follow-up, Unreal Tournament, and expanded into a series of games.

In addition to his work on the Unreal series, Bleszinski served as creative consultant on Rune, and as lead designer on the first three installments of the Gears of War franchise, which has sold over 22 million copies and earned over one billion in revenue as of January 2014. Gears of War evolved out of the development of what was going to be a game called Unreal Warfare. As Bleszinski explained in a speech at GDC 2007 entitled "Designing Gears of War: Iteration Wins," the game started out as another first-person shooter in the Unreal universe. Over time, however, influenced by the cover mechanic in Namco's 2003 game Kill Switch and the third-person Resident Evil 4, Unreal Warfare became the game known as Gears of War. In 2009, he was chosen by IGN as one of the top 100 game creators of all time.

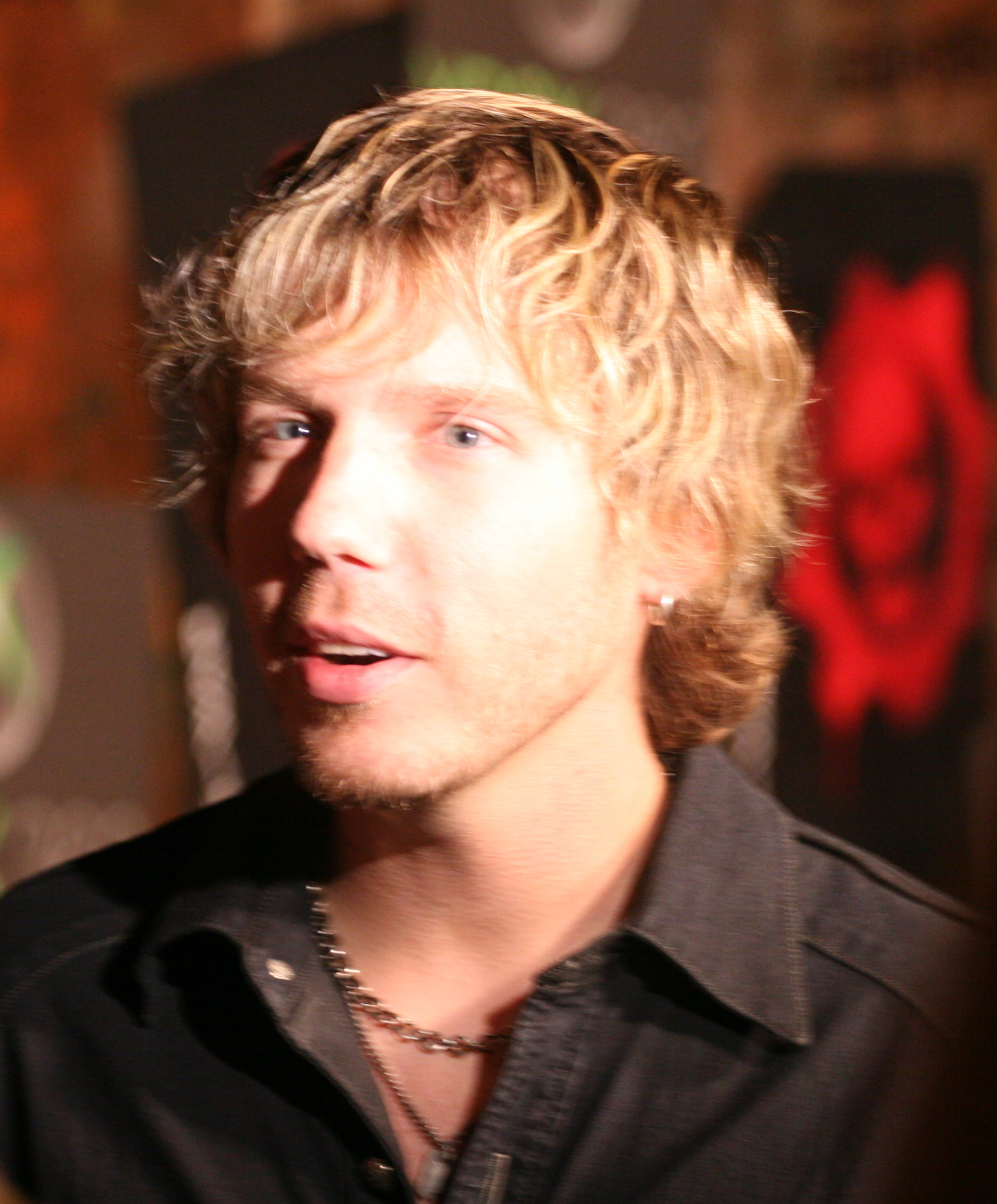
Bleszinski at the Gears of War launch event at the Hollywood Forever Cemetery, 2006

After 20 years with the company, Cliff announced his departure from Epic Games on October 3, 2012, saying he had been making video games since he was a teen and wanted to take a break. According to a 2015 interview, his original intention was to retire permanently. "I honestly thought I was done... It was a combination of gamers feeling jaded, as well as working with some very talented people who were also very jaded," Bleszinski told Destructoid. "I could pitch the most amazing idea to anybody back when I was at Epic toward the end, and they'd be like 'I don't buy it,'" he added.

=== Boss Key Productions (2014–2018) ===
On June 30, 2014, Cliff announced on Twitter that he was "coming out of retirement to make video games again" and would be unveiling his next project in the next week. The new game, a free-to-play, PC-focused arena shooter code-named BlueStreak, would be published by Nexon and developed by his new studio, Boss Key Productions, which he co-founded with Brussee the same year. A year later, Bleszinski revealed that the arena shooter would be called LawBreakers.

In May 2016, he joined the board of advisers for Fig, a mixed crowdfunding/investment platform for video games.

On May 14, 2018, Bleszinski announced the dissolution of Boss Key Productions, citing lackluster sales.

=== Later career (2018–present) ===
After the closure of Boss Key, Bleszinski has gotten involved with theater production. He invested and co-produced Hadestown, and was similarly involved with a revival of Frankie and Johnny in the Clair de Lune. He has also expressed interest in returning to the Gears of War series as an adviser.

His memoir, Control Freak: My Epic Adventure Making Video Games, was published in November 2022 by Simon & Schuster.

In April 2023, Bleszinski announced that he was writing a comic book series titled Scrapper in collaboration with Alex De Campi, with illustrations by Sandy Jarrell. Its first issue will be released on July 19 by Image Comics.

== Personal life ==
Cliff is married to Lauren Bleszinski (née Berggren), a former professional gamer and id Software employee. Previously, he was married to a woman named Darcy. One of his brothers (Note: His other brother is Greg Bleszinski.) is Tyler Bleszinski, the founder of Polygon sister site SB Nation. Their father, who died when Cliff was 15, was an engineer for Polaroid. The nickname "CliffyB" was given to him derogatorily by "some jock kid" when he was a shy teenager; he then took it and developed a tougher persona around it. However, in 2008 he expressed a desire to retire the moniker, saying it's "time to grow up a bit".

In 1987, Bleszinski got a Nintendo Entertainment System for Christmas, which turned him into a huge video game fan. "My friends nicknamed me 'Nintendo Boy' because my entire life revolved around my NES. I was eating Nintendo cereal, wearing Nintendo clothing. My dream job was to work for Nintendo. I was pretty inseparable from my NES," said Bleszinski. He said his favorite NES game of all time is Zanac.

In 1988, at 13, Cliff appeared in the first issue of Nintendo Power for earning the high score of 9,999,950 in Super Mario Bros.. Regarding the achievement, he commented in a 2017 interview with Rolling Stone "that was probably one of the moments when I realized, deep-down and subconsciously, I wanted to be a 'name' in this business of video games." He also went to the Nintendo World Championships when he was 15, coming in second in Massachusetts.

In 1998, Bleszinski rose to fame in the Internet when he held a contest inviting visitors of his website to scan their cats on flatbed scanners and submit the photos for judging.

In 2000, PC Gamer featured Bleszinski in the cover of its November issue, calling him one of the "Next Game Gods." Wired magazine awarded him a Rave Award in 2007 for his work on Gears of War. Shortly before the release of its sequel, Bleszinski was profiled in 2008 by Tom Bissell of The New Yorker in an article titled "The Grammar of Fun". On April 12, 2010, he appeared on NBC's Late Night with Jimmy Fallon, where he showed the debut trailer for Gears of War 3 and cited Space Invaders as the game that initially inspired him.

Bleszinski has opened two bars in Raleigh, North Carolina, the first one in 2014 called The Station, followed by The Raleigh Beer Garden in 2015.

== Credits ==
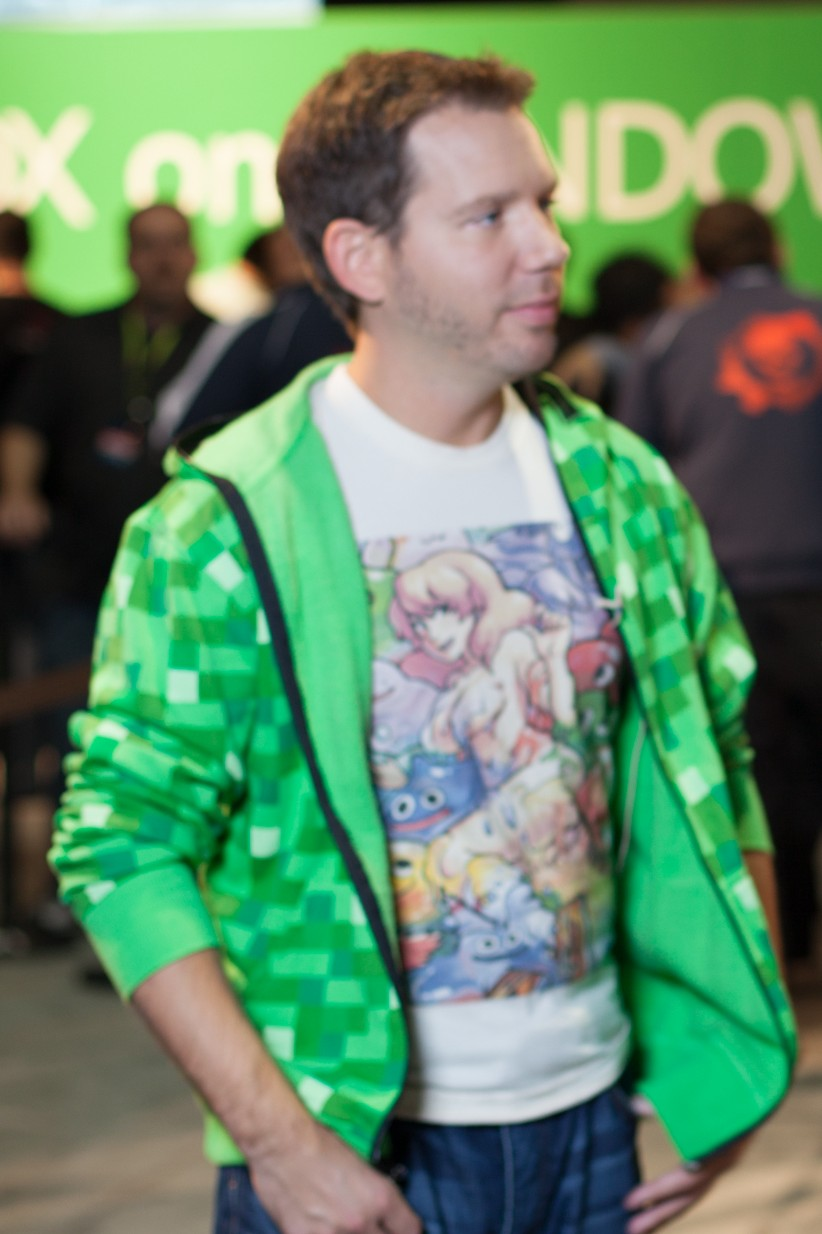
Bleszinski at PAX Prime 2012

=== Video games ===
- The Palace of Deceit (1991)
- Dare to Dream (1993)
- Jazz Jackrabbit (1994)
- Jazz Jackrabbit 2 (1998)
- Unreal (1998)
- Unreal Tournament (1999)
- Rune (2000) (creative consultant)
- Unreal Tournament 2003 (2002)
- Unreal II: The Awakening (2003)
- Unreal Tournament 2004 (2004)
- Unreal Championship 2: The Liandri Conflict (2005)
- Gears of War (2006)
- Gears of War 2 (2008)
- Shadow Complex (2009)
- Bulletstorm (2011)
- Gears of War 3 (2011)
- Superhot (2016) (co-designer of an arena stage)
- LawBreakers (2017)
- Radical Heights (cancelled)

=== Filmography ===
- Stay Alive (2006) (consultant)
- Various Mega64 skits
- Jake and Amir, episode "The Hot Date" (2011) (played himself)
- Sonic for Hire, episode "Gears of War" (2013) (played himself)
- Video Game High School, season 2 episode 1 (2013)
- Starbomb, "I Choose You TO DIE!!!" (2014)
- Video Games: The Movie (2014) (producer, interviewed)
- The Jimquisition, episode "The Golden Sins of Horror Games" (2015) (played himself)
- Gears of War (TBA) (executive producer, consultant)

=== Books ===
- Cliff Bleszinski, Jerry O'Flaherty & Eric S. Nylund (2006). Destroyed Beauty: An Inside Look at Gears of War. Epic Games.
- Cliff Bleszinski, Joshua Ortega & Rod Fergusson (2008). Beneath the Surface: An Inside Look at Gears of War 2. Epic Games.
- Cliff Bleszinski (2022). Control Freak: My Epic Adventure Making Video Games. Simon & Schuster.
