= Jazz Jackrabbit (2002 video game) =

- North American cover art
- Developer: Game Titan
- Publisher: Jaleco
- Series: Jazz Jackrabbit
- Platform: Game Boy Advance
- Release: NA: December 20, 2002; EU: June 27, 2003
- Genre: Side-scrolling platformer
- Modes: Single-player, multiplayer (supporting up to 4 players)

Jazz Jackrabbit is a 2002 platform game developed by Game Titan and published by Jaleco under license from Epic Games. It is the third game in the Jazz Jackrabbit series.

== Gameplay ==
The game is a side-scroller run 'n' gun platformer. Unlike previous titles in the Jazz Jackrabbit series, the player can aim their gun in all eight cardinal directions, being able to fix their aim by firing while standing still. Ammunition for various weapons can be found during stages, though those are fairly rare. During the stages the players can also find money, which can be used in the intermissions between stages to buy ammunition or extra lives.

=== Multiplayer ===
This title brings back the multiplayer mode from the second title, with 11 unique levels and support to up to four players through the GBA Link Cable. Only one copy of the game is necessary to enable the multiplayer mode.

== Plot ==
The game begins as Jazz, during a routine mission, is captured by the Chameleon army on their home planet. Upon escaping, Jazz decides to retire from his job, but is prevented from doing so by R.A.B.T. HQ, which gives him a new mission to investigate a Saurian attack with the promise of a good money reward. Jazz discovers the involvement of the Turtle Army behind the attack, and upon following them he discovers his old nemesis Dark Shell, whom he believed dead, is seeking revenge on him for his previous defeat.

== Reception ==
GameSpot named Jazz Jackrabbit the second-best Game Boy Advance game of January 2003, behind Karnaaj Rally.
