= Arjan Brussee =

Dutch video game programmer and entrepreneur (born 1972)

Arjan Brussee (pronounced ar-yan broo-zhay) (born 1972) is a Dutch video game programmer and entrepreneur. He was the main coder of the first two Jazz Jackrabbit games and co-founded Guerrilla Games and Boss Key Productions. He is often credited with being the first successful Dutch game developer.

== Career ==
Brussee was a member of the demoscene group Ultra Force, where he coded Vectordemo, one of the first demos with 3D imagery on IBM PC compatibles.

At Guerrilla Games, he worked on the Killzone series as a development director and part of the management team. On 23 February 2012, Brussee announced that he was leaving Guerilla to join the EA Games studio Visceral Games as an executive producer for Battlefield Hardline.

In July 2014, news leaked of Brussee leaving EA and co-founding Boss Key Productions with Cliff Bleszinski. In December 2017, Brussee left Boss Key Productions to return to Epic Games after a 20-year hiatus from the company. Since rejoining Epic Games, Brussee had been working on an unannounced project.

In April 2026, Arjan Brussee left Epic Games and has been working as a freelance developer ever since. In May 2026, he announced that he was working on a video game engine called The Immens Engine, which is intended to serve as a European counterpart to Unreal Engine and Unity.
