= List of PopCap Games games =

This is a list of video games published and/or developed by PopCap Games.

== List of games ==
=== As Sexy Action Cool ===
Year	Title	Platform(s)	Publisher	Notes	Ref
2000	Foxy Poker	Browser	Sexy Action Cool		

=== As PopCap Games ===
Year	Title	Platform(s)	Publisher	Notes
2000	Diamond Mine	Java	PopCap Games	A prototypical precursor to Bejeweled. The version for Adobe Flash was developed by GameRival, and features subtly altered mechanics.
2000	Diamond Mine	Adobe Flash	PopCap Games	A prototypical precursor to Bejeweled. The version for Adobe Flash was developed by GameRival, and features subtly altered mechanics.
2000	Bejeweled	Microsoft Windows	PopCap Games	
2000	Bejeweled	Browser	PopCap Games	
2000	Bejeweled	Palm OS	PopCap Games	
2000	Bejeweled	Mac OS X	PopCap Games	
2000	Bejeweled	Pocket PC	PopCap Games	
2000	Bejeweled	Java ME	PopCap Games	
2000	Bejeweled	BREW	PopCap Games	
2000	Bejeweled	Windows Mobile	PopCap Games	
2000	Bejeweled	Xbox	PopCap Games	
2000	Bejeweled	iPod 5G	PopCap Games	
2000	Bejeweled	BlackBerry OS	PopCap Games	
2000	Bejeweled	Symbian	PopCap Games	
2001	Insaniquarium	Microsoft Windows	PopCap Games	Developed by Flying Bear Entertainment. The game released in 2001, but was published by PopCap Games from 2002 onwards.
2001	Insaniquarium	Java	PopCap Games	Developed by Flying Bear Entertainment. The game released in 2001, but was published by PopCap Games from 2002 onwards.
2001	Seven Seas	Microsoft Windows	PopCap Games	
2001	Candy Train	Browser	PopCap Games	
2001	Alchemy	Microsoft Windows	PopCap Games	
2002	Alchemy	Mac OS Classic	PopCap Games	
2002	Alchemy	Mac OS X	PopCap Games	
2002	Atomica	Microsoft Windows	PopCap Games	
2002	Big Money!	Microsoft Windows	PopCap Games	
2002	Big Money!	Mac OS X	PopCap Games	
2002	Dynomite	Microsoft Windows	PopCap Games	Developed by Raptisoft Games
2002	Mummy Maze	Microsoft Windows	PopCap Games	
2002	Mummy Maze	Mac OS X	PopCap Games	
2002	NingPo MahJong	Microsoft Windows	PopCap Games	Developed by Pyrogon,Inc.
2002	NingPo MahJong	Mac OS X	PopCap Games	Developed by Pyrogon,Inc.
2002	Noah's Ark	Microsoft Windows	PopCap Games	
2002	TipTop	Microsoft Windows	PopCap Games	Developed by ASAP Games LLC
2002	TipTop	Windows Mobile	PopCap Games	Developed by ASAP Games LLC
2003	Bookworm	Microsoft Windows	PopCap Games	
2003	Bookworm	Mac OS X	PopCap Games	
2003	Bookworm	iOS	PopCap Games	
2003	Bookworm	Xbox Live Arcade	PopCap Games	
2003	Bookworm	PDA	PopCap Games	
2003	Bookworm	Smartphone	PopCap Games	
2003	Bookworm	Java ME	PopCap Games	
2003	Bookworm	BREW	PopCap Games	
2003	Word Harmony	Microsoft Windows	PopCap Games	Developed by Sprout Games
2003	Rocket Mania!	Microsoft Windows	PopCap Games	Developed by Nuclide Games
2003	Rocket Mania!	Windows Mobile	PopCap Games	Developed by Nuclide Games
2003	Rocket Mania!	Palm OS	PopCap Games	Developed by Nuclide Games
2003	Sweet Tooth To Go	Microsoft Windows	Pogo.com	
2003	Typer Shark	Microsoft Windows	PopCap Games	
2003	Zuma	Microsoft Windows	PopCap Games	
2003	Zuma	Mac OS X	PopCap Games	
2003	Zuma	iPod	PopCap Games	
2003	Zuma	Mobile Phone	PopCap Games	
2003	Zuma	Windows Mobile	PopCap Games	
2003	Zuma	Xbox Live Arcade	PopCap Games	
2003	Zuma	PlayStation 2 (Note: Released only in PopCap Hits Vol. 2.)	PopCap Games	
2003	Zuma	PSN	PopCap Games	
2003	Zuma	Palm OS	PopCap Games	
2003	Zuma	Java	PopCap Games	
2003	Zuma	In-flight entertainment	PopCap Games	
2004	Iggle Pop!	Microsoft Windows	PopCap Games	Developed by Sprout Games
2004	Cosmic Bugs	Microsoft Windows	PopCap Games	Developed by Retro64. It was published by PopCap Games from 2007 onwards.
2004	Insaniquarium	PDA	PopCap Games	
2004	Insaniquarium	PC	PopCap Games	
2004	Feeding Frenzy	Microsoft Windows	PopCap Games	Developed by Sprout Games
2004	Feeding Frenzy	Mac OS X	PopCap Games	Developed by Sprout Games
2004	Feeding Frenzy	Xbox Live Arcade	PopCap Games	Developed by Sprout Games
2004	Feeding Frenzy	J2ME	PopCap Games	Developed by Sprout Games
2004	Pixelus	Microsoft Windows	PopCap Games	Developed by Nuclide Games
2004	AstroPop	Microsoft Windows	PopCap Games	
2004	AstroPop	PlayStation 2 (Note: Released only in PopCap Hits Vol. 1.)	PopCap Games	
2004	AstroPop	Xbox Live Arcade	PopCap Games	
2004	AstroPop	Adobe Flash	PopCap Games	
2004	AstroPop	Mobile Phone	PopCap Games	
2004	Bejeweled 2	Microsoft Windows	PopCap Games	
2005	Bejeweled 2	Xbox Live Arcade	PopCap Games	Developed by Oberon Media
2005	Chuzzle	Microsoft Windows	PopCap Games	Developed by Raptisoft Games
2005	Chuzzle	Mac OS X	PopCap Games	Developed by Raptisoft Games
2005	Chuzzle	Java ME	PopCap Games	Developed by Raptisoft Games
2005	Chuzzle	iOS	PopCap Games	Developed by Raptisoft Games
2005	Chuzzle	Android	PopCap Games	Developed by Raptisoft Games
2005	Heavy Weapon	Microsoft Windows	PopCap Games	
2005	Heavy Weapon	Macintosh	PopCap Games	
2005	Heavy Weapon	Xbox Live Arcade	PopCap Games	
2005	Heavy Weapon	PlayStation 2	PopCap Games	
2005	Heavy Weapon	PlayStation 3	PopCap Games	
2005	Heavy Weapon	Zeebo	PopCap Games	
2005	Water Bugs	Microsoft Windows	PopCap Games	Developed by Retro64
2005	Pizza Frenzy	Microsoft Windows	PopCap Games	Developed by Sprout Games
2005	Bonnie's Bookstore	Microsoft Windows	PopCap Games	Developed by New Crayon Games
2005	Bonnie's Bookstore	Macintosh	PopCap Games	Developed by New Crayon Games
2006	Bookworm Adventures	Microsoft Windows	PopCap Games	
2006	Feeding Frenzy 2	Microsoft Windows	PopCap Games	Developed by Sprout Games
2006	Insaniquarium	Mobile Phone	PopCap Games	
2006	Bejeweled 2	iPod	PopCap Games	
2006	Iggle Pop!	Macintosh	PopCap Games	
2006	Hammer Heads	Microsoft Windows	PopCap Games	Developed by Nuclide Games
2006	Talismania	Microsoft Windows	PopCap Games	Developed by RocketJump Games
2007	Peggle	Microsoft Windows	PopCap Games	
2007	Peggle	Mac OS X	PopCap Games	
2007	Peggle	iPod	PopCap Games	
2007	Peggle Extreme	Microsoft Windows	PopCap Games	Co-Developed by Valve
2007	Bejeweled 2	PlayStation 2	PopCap Games	
2007	Venice	Microsoft Windows	PopCap Games	Developed by Retro64
2007	Amazing Adventures: The Lost Tomb	Microsoft Windows	PopCap Games	Developed by SpinTop Games
2008	Insaniquarium	Palm OS	PopCap Games	
2008	Insaniquarium	Windows Mobile	PopCap Games	
2008	Feeding Frenzy 2	Xbox Live Arcade	PopCap Games	
2008	Peggle	BREW	PopCap Games	
2008	Peggle	JavaME	PopCap Games	
2008	Peggle	Windows Mobile	PopCap Games	
2008	Bejeweled 2	iOS (Note: Called Bejeweled 2 when it first released until April 18, 2009 where the name was changed to Bejeweled 2 + Blitz as it added Bejeweled Blitz to it in a update.)	PopCap Games	
2008	Amazing Adventures: Around the World	Microsoft Windows	PopCap Games	Developed by SpinTop Games
2008	The Wizard's Pen	Microsoft Windows	PopCap Games	
2008	Chuzzle: Christmas Edition	Microsoft Windows	PopCap Games	Developed by Raptisoft Games
2008	Bejeweled Twist	Microsoft Windows	PopCap Games	
2008	Bejeweled Twist	Java ME	PopCap Games	
2008	Bejeweled Twist	Zeebo	PopCap Games	
2008	Bejeweled Twist	Adobe Flash	PopCap Games	
2008	Bejeweled Twist	Symbian	PopCap Games	
2008	Peggle Nights	Microsoft Windows	PopCap Games	
2009	Peggle Nights	Mac OS X	PopCap Games	
2009	Peggle Nights	Xbox 360	PopCap Games	
2009	Peggle Nights	PlayStation 3	PopCap Games	
2009	Peggle: Dual Shot	Nintendo DS	PopCap Games	Developed by Q Entertainment
2009	Bejeweled 2	PlayStation 3	Sony Online Entertainment	
2009	Peggle	PlayStation 3	PopCap Games	
2009	Peggle	Xbox 360	PopCap Games	
2009	Peggle	iOS	PopCap Games	
2009	Gyromancer	Microsoft Windows	Square Enix	
2009	Gyromancer	Xbox Live Arcade	Square Enix	
2009	Plants vs. Zombies	Microsoft Windows	PopCap Games	
2009	Plants vs. Zombies	Mac OS X	PopCap Games	
2009	Zuma's Revenge!	Microsoft Windows	PopCap Games	
2009	Zuma's Revenge!	Mac OS X	PopCap Games	
2009	Zuma's Revenge!	Windows Phone	PopCap Games	
2009	Zuma's Revenge!	iOS	PopCap Games	
2009	Zuma's Revenge!	Java	PopCap Games	
2009	Zuma's Revenge!	Xbox Live Arcade	PopCap Games	
2009	Zuma's Revenge!	PSN	PopCap Games	
2009	Escape Rosecliff Island	Microsoft Windows	PopCap Games	Developed by SpinTop Games
2009	Escape Rosecliff Island	Mac OS X	PopCap Games	Developed by SpinTop Games
2009	Escape Rosecliff Island	iOS	PopCap Games	Developed by SpinTop Games
2009	Bookworm Adventures: Volume 2	Microsoft Windows	PopCap Games	
2009	Bookworm Adventures: Volume 2	Mac OS X	PopCap Games	
2009	Amazing Adventures: The Caribbean Secret	Microsoft Windows	PopCap Games	Developed by SpinTop Games
2009	Bookworm	Nintendo DS	PopCap Games	Developed by Black Lantern Studios
2009	Bookworm	DSiWare	PopCap Games	Developed by Black Lantern Studios
2009	Bejeweled Twist	Mobile Phone	PopCap Games	
2009	Bejeweled Twist	DSiWare	PopCap Games	Co-Developed by Griptonite Games
2010	Bejeweled Twist	Nintendo DS	PopCap Games	Co-Developed by Griptonite Games
2010	Feeding Frenzy 2	PSN	PopCap Games	
2010	Peggle	PlayStation Portable	PopCap Games	
2010	Peggle	Zeebo	PopCap Games	
2010	Plants vs. Zombies	iOS	PopCap Games	
2010	Plants vs. Zombies	iPadOS	PopCap Games	
2010	Plants vs. Zombies	Xbox 360	PopCap Games	
2010	Bejeweled 2	WiiWare	PopCap Games	
2010	Bejeweled 2	PlayStation Portable	PopCap Games	
2010	Zuma Blitz	Facebook	PopCap Games	
2010	Amazing Adventures: The Forgotten Dynasty	Microsoft Windows	PopCap Games	Developed by SpinTop Games
2010	Banana Bugs	Microsoft Windows	PopCap Games	
2010	Bejeweled Blitz	Facebook	PopCap Games	
2010	Bejeweled Blitz	Microsoft Windows	PopCap Games	
2010	Bejeweled Blitz	Mac OS X	PopCap Games	
2010	Bejeweled Blitz	iOS	PopCap Games	
2010	Bejeweled 3	Microsoft Windows	PopCap Games	
2010	Bejeweled 3	Mac OS X	PopCap Games	
2010	Bejeweled 3	Java ME	PopCap Games	
2010	Bejeweled 3	Android TV	PopCap Games	
2010	Bejeweled 3	Windows Phone	PopCap Games	
2011	Bejeweled 3	Nintendo DS	PopCap Games	
2011	Bejeweled 3	PlayStation 3	PopCap Games	
2011	Bejeweled 3	Xbox 360	PopCap Games	
2011	Bejeweled: Classic (Note: Called Bejeweled when it first released until October 22, 2015 where the name was changed to Bejeweled Classic to not confuse it with Bejeweled Stars.)	iOS	EA Mobile	
2011	Candy Train (2011)	iOS	PopCap Games	Developed by 4th & Battery
2011	Zuma's Revenge!	Nintendo DS	PopCap Games	
2011	Zuma's Revenge!	Xbox 360	PopCap Games	
2011	Escape the Emerald Star	Microsoft Windows	PopCap Games	
2011	Escape the Emerald Star	Mac OS X	PopCap Games	
2011	Plants vs. Zombies	Nintendo DS	PopCap Games	
2011	Plants vs. Zombies	DSiWare	PopCap Games	
2011	Plants vs. Zombies	PSN	Sony Online Entertainment	
2011	Plants vs. Zombies	Android	PopCap Games	Developed by PopCap Dublin
2011	Plants vs. Zombies	Windows Phone	PopCap Games	Developed by PopCap Dublin
2011	Peggle	Android	EA Mobile	
2011	Bejeweled 2	Android	EA Mobile	
2011	Allied Star Police	iOS	PopCap Games	Developed by 4th & Battery
2011	Unpleasant Horse	iOS	PopCap Games	Developed by 4th & Battery

=== As a subsidiary of Electronic Arts ===
Year	Title	Platform(s)	Publisher	Notes
2011	Plants vs. Zombies	Kindle Fire	PopCap Games	
2011	Plants vs. Zombies	Nook HD	PopCap Games	
2012	Plants vs. Zombies	PlayStation Vita	Sony Online Entertainment	
2012	Amazing Adventures: The Forgotten Dynasty	Microsoft Windows	Electronic Arts	Developed by SpinTop Games
2012	Solitaire Blitz	Facebook	Electronic Arts	
2012	Solitaire Blitz	iOS	Electronic Arts	
2012	Solitaire Blitz	Android	Electronic Arts	
2012	Bejeweled Legends	iOS	Electronic Arts, LAND HOI Co., and Gree (Japanese company)	Developed by PopCap Games Tokyo Studio.
2012	Bejeweled Legends	Android	Electronic Arts, LAND HOI Co., and Gree (Japanese company)	Developed by PopCap Games Tokyo Studio.
2013	Plants vs. Zombies	BlackBerry 10	PopCap Games	
2013	Bejeweled Blitz	Android	EA Mobile	
2013	Bejeweled: Live	Windows Apps	EA Mobile	
2013	Bejeweled: Live+	Windows Phone	EA Mobile	
2013	Plants vs. Zombies 2	Android	EA Mobile	
2013	Plants vs. Zombies 2	iOS	EA Mobile	
2013	Peggle 2	Xbox One	Electronic Arts	
2014	Peggle 2	PlayStation 4	Electronic Arts	
2014	Peggle 2	Xbox 360	Electronic Arts	
2014	Peggle Blast	Android	EA Mobile	
2014	Peggle Blast	iOS	EA Mobile	
2014	Bejeweled: Classic (Note: Called Bejeweled when it first released until October 22, 2015 where the name was changed to Bejeweled Classic to not confuse it with Bejeweled Stars.)	Android	EA Mobile	
2014	Plants vs. Zombies FREE	Android	EA Mobile	
2014	Plants vs. Zombies FREE	iOS	EA Mobile	
2014	Plants vs. Zombies: Garden Warfare	Microsoft Windows	Electronic Arts	Developed by PopCap Vancouver
2014	Plants vs. Zombies: Garden Warfare	PlayStation 3	Electronic Arts	Developed by PopCap Vancouver
2014	Plants vs. Zombies: Garden Warfare	PlayStation 4	Electronic Arts	Developed by PopCap Vancouver
2014	Plants vs. Zombies: Garden Warfare	Xbox 360	Electronic Arts	Developed by PopCap Vancouver
2014	Plants vs. Zombies: Garden Warfare	Xbox One	Electronic Arts	Developed by PopCap Vancouver
2016	Bejeweled Stars	Android	EA Mobile	
2016	Bejeweled Stars	iOS	EA Mobile	
2016	Plants vs. Zombies: Garden Warfare 2	Microsoft Windows	Electronic Arts	Developed by PopCap Vancouver
2016	Plants vs. Zombies: Garden Warfare 2	PlayStation 4	Electronic Arts	Developed by PopCap Vancouver
2016	Plants vs. Zombies: Garden Warfare 2	Xbox One	Electronic Arts	Developed by PopCap Vancouver
2016	Plants vs. Zombies Heroes	Android	EA Mobile	
2016	Plants vs. Zombies Heroes	iOS	EA Mobile	
2019	Plants vs. Zombies: Battle for Neighborville	Microsoft Windows	Electronic Arts	Developed by PopCap Vancouver
2019	Plants vs. Zombies: Battle for Neighborville	PlayStation 4	Electronic Arts	Developed by PopCap Vancouver
2019	Plants vs. Zombies: Battle for Neighborville	Xbox One	Electronic Arts	Developed by PopCap Vancouver
2020	Bejeweled Champions	Android	WorldWinner	
2020	Bejeweled Champions	iOS	WorldWinner	
2020	Bejeweled Champions	Browser	WorldWinner	
2021	Plants vs. Zombies: Battle for Neighborville	Nintendo Switch	Electronic Arts	Developed by PopCap Vancouver
2025	Plants vs. Zombies: Replanted	Microsoft Windows	Electronic Arts	Co-Developed by The Lost Pixels
2025	Plants vs. Zombies: Replanted	PlayStation 4	Electronic Arts	Co-Developed by The Lost Pixels
2025	Plants vs. Zombies: Replanted	PlayStation 5	Electronic Arts	Co-Developed by The Lost Pixels
2025	Plants vs. Zombies: Replanted	Xbox One	Electronic Arts	Co-Developed by The Lost Pixels
2025	Plants vs. Zombies: Replanted	Xbox Series X and Series S	Electronic Arts	Co-Developed by The Lost Pixels
2025	Plants vs. Zombies: Replanted	Nintendo Switch	Electronic Arts	Co-Developed by The Lost Pixels
2025	Plants vs. Zombies: Replanted	Nintendo Switch 2	Electronic Arts	Co-Developed by The Lost Pixels
TBD	Plants vs. Zombies 3	Android	EA Mobile	
TBD	Plants vs. Zombies 3	iOS	EA Mobile	

== Developed and/or published ==
=== From SpinTop Games ===
- Amazing Adventures: The Lost Tomb (2007)
- Amazing Adventures: Around the World (2008)
- Amazing Adventures: The Caribbean Secret (2009)
- Amazing Adventures: The Forgotten Dynasty (2010)
- Amazing Adventures: Riddle Of The Two Knights (2011)
- Escape The Emerald Star
- Escape Rosecliff Island
- Escape Whisper Valley
- Hidden Identity – Chicago Blackout
- Mahjong Escape: Ancient China
- Mahjong Escape: Ancient Japan
- Mystery P.I.: Lost in Los Angeles
- Mystery P.I.: Stolen in San Francisco
- Mystery P.I.: The London Caper
- Mystery P.I.: The Lottery Ticket
- Mystery P.I.: The New York Fortune
- Mystery P.I.: The Vegas Heist
- Mystery P.I.: The Curious Case of Counterfeit Cove
- Mystery Solitaire: Secret Island
- Vacation Quest - The Hawaiian Islands
- Vacation Quest - Australia

=== Discontinued ===
- Atomic Poker (multiplayer game)
- Baking Life
- Bookworm Heroes
- Candy Train (2001)
- Lucky Penny (multiplayer game)
- Plants vs. Zombies Adventures
- Popcorn Dragon
- Psychobabble (multiplayer game)
