= Peter Hajba =

- Also known as: Skaven
- Born: 15 December 1974 (age 51)
- Occupations: Composer, graphic artist, sound designer
- Years active: 1989–present
- Website: www.futurecrew.com/skaven/

Peter Hajba (born 15 December 1974), also known by his demoscene nickname Skaven, is a Finnish electronic musician, video game composer and graphic artist. His most recent project is with Remedy Entertainment as an animator, sound designer and graphic artist. Prior to working with Remedy, Hajba has been credited on games developed by 3D Realms, PopCap Games, Introversion Software Limited, Epic Games, and Housemarque.

Hajba was a member of the widely popular but now defunct demoscene group Future Crew, which produced some highly acclaimed demos during the 1990s. Despite having no formal training, he has won numerous awards for his music, including winning the Assembly music competition in 1993, 1995 and 2002.

In 2005, Hajba composed the soundtrack for the Text Mode Demo Contest invitation demo.

As of 2012, Hajba now regularly releases tracks on his SoundCloud page.

== Video game credits ==
- 1998 – GLtron
- 1999 – Unreal Tournament – music for the "Peak Monastery" and "Liandri Core" level
- 2000 – Bejeweled
- 2001 – Uplink
- 2001 – Seven Seas Deluxe
- 2001 – Max Payne – Particle effects, character animation and sound effects
- 2001 – Alchemy Deluxe
- 2002 – Dynomite Deluxe
- 2002 – Codename Silver
- 2002 – Bookworm Deluxe
- 2002 – Big Money! Deluxe
- 2003 – Warblade
- 2003 – Sweet Tooth To Go
- 2003 – Max Payne 2: The Fall of Max Payne – Particle effects, sound design and voice engineering
- 2004 – Bejeweled 2 Deluxe
- 2004 – Hamsterball
- 2007 – PopCap Hits! Vol 1
- 2007 – PopCap Arcade Vol 1
- 2008 – Bejeweled Twist
- 2009 – Boonka
- 2010 – Bejeweled 3
- 2010 – Alan Wake – Sound design, particle effects, additional graphics
- 2011 – Death Rally (Remake)
- 2011 – Bejeweled Blitz Live
- 2012 – Alan Wake's American Nightmare
- 2015 - Ice Rage
- 2019 - Generation Zero
