= Bejeweled =

Bejeweled may refer to:

- Bejeweled (series), a series of tile-matching puzzle video games
  - Bejeweled (video game), the first game in the series, released in 2000
- "Bejeweled" (song), a 2022 song by Taylor Swift
