= Zuma's Revenge! =

2009 video game

- Steam storefront header
- Developer: PopCap Games
- Publishers: PopCap Games; Electronic Arts
- Series: Zuma
- Engine: PopCap Games Framework
- Platforms: Microsoft Windows; Xbox 360; Windows Phone; OS X Nintendo DS; Nintendo DSiWare iOS; Java; Xbox Live Arcade; PlayStation Network
- Release: September 15, 2009
- Genre: Puzzle
- Mode: Single-player

Zuma's Revenge! is a 2009 tile-matching puzzle video game developed and published by PopCap Games. It was released for Microsoft Windows and Mac OS X, as a sequel to the earlier 2003 video game, Zuma, and was later ported to Windows Phone.

Compared to its predecessor, Zuma's Revenge! features high-definition graphics, new levels and power-ups, several new features, as well as boss battles. A Nintendo DS version was introduced in February 2011 which features daily challenges, versus mode and achievements. The physical copy for the Xbox 360 includes two bonus titles: Bejeweled 3 and Feeding Frenzy 2.

Upon release, the game received mostly positive reviews from critics, with many citing the boss battles and gags as the game's highlights, but the game did receive minor criticism for its similarity to the previous game.

== Gameplay ==
As in Zuma, the main objective of Zuma's Revenge! is to clear strings of rolling balls, or 'stones', by matching balls of the same color. Players move a ball-shooting frog which always points in the direction of the mouse to aim and fire balls at these strings. When three or more balls of the same color match together, they are cleared from the playfield. This clearing creates gaps through which a player may shoot more balls at nearby strings, target bonus fruit, and 'power-up' stones. Gaps automatically close if the balls at either end of the gap are (or become) the same color, potentially creating chain reaction matching and clearing as new sets of three or more are formed.

The strings of balls constantly roll along their tracks toward a skull emblem at the end. Should they reach the emblem, the stone frog idol gets eaten by the skull emblem and the player loses a life, and the game ends when the player runs out of lives. Unlike in the original Zuma in which regardless of stage, they are allowed to play stage one of the temple again, when the player gets a game over, they will start again at the checkpoint (stage one of an area if the player loses before the mid-level and stage six if the same situation happens in stages six to ten). The strings are always "pushed" by the last ball in the string, so any balls not connected to the rearmost string do not move on their own.

Periodically, random balls display power-ups which the player may collect by destroying the ball. These include a visual guide to show where a ball will land when shot, power-ups that slow down or reverse the direction of the string, a three-way cannon that blasts through all layers of balls, a laser that can destroy single balls, a bomb, and a lightning power-up which destroys all balls of a specific color.

Zuma's Revenge! introduces three types of levels that are new to the series. Some levels feature two lily pads that the frog can jump between, while other levels set the frog on a horizontal or vertical track and enable it to slide side-to-side or up-and-down rather than rotate to aim. There are also boss levels where the player has to shoot balls toward the enemies to reduce their hit points while simultaneously preventing the ball string(s) from reaching the skull emblem. The enemies in turn shoot projectiles that will induce a certain gimmick if they hit the player. These levels have an unlimited number of lives, so if any single ball reaches the emblem, the player will simply restart the level, since there is no game over in boss levels.

=== Game modes ===
The game features four game modes. In Adventure mode, the player progresses through a Polynesian-style island ruled by the angry god Zhaka Mu. There are six island areas that consist of ten levels each. At the end of each island area, the player encounters a tiki god and must face the god in a boss battle. As the player progresses in the Adventure mode, Iron Frog and Challenge modes are unlocked (Boss Rush is unlocked as well in versions that have this feature). In Iron Frog, the player has to progress through ten completely new, difficult levels with only one life. In Boss Rush, the player fights all eight bosses from the Adventure mode consecutively and tries to get the fastest time.

In each mode except Boss Rush mode, the player must reach a general point goal to achieve "Zuma", at which point the level stops adding balls to the string(s) and the string(s) temporarily move(s) backwards. The player must then clear all of the remaining balls from the playfield to move on to the next level.

== Reception ==
Zuma's Revenge! reception

Aggregate scores
Aggregator	Score			
Aggregator	DS	iOS	PC	Xbox 360
GameRankings	77%	90%	79.47%	76.23%
Metacritic	75/100	N/A	78/100	76/100

Zuma's Revenge! received fairly positive reviews from critics on Metacritic and GameRankings. On Metacritic, the game holds mostly positive reviews, and is currently ranked the 87th best-reviewed game of 2012 for the Xbox 360. IGN gave the game an 8 out of 10, complementing the game's boss battles, graphics, and "lighthearted" humor, but criticized its similarity to the original. Dale North for Destructoid also gave the game an 8 out of 10, praising the graphics and gameplay, and considered the game to be visually better than its predecessor.
