= Gyromancer =

2009 video game

- Developers: Square Enix; PopCap Games
- Publisher: Square Enix
- Director: Yuichi Murasawa
- Producer: Yoshinori Kamei
- Designer: Jason Kapalka
- Artist: Yuki Matsuzawa
- Writer: Kyoko Kitahara
- Composer: Tsuyoshi Sekito
- Platforms: Microsoft Windows, Xbox 360
- Release: November 18, 2009
- Genres: Puzzle, role-playing
- Mode: Single-player

Gyromancer (Note: Japanese: ジャイロマンサー, Hepburn: Jairomansā) is a puzzle and role-playing video game developed by PopCap Games in collaboration with Square Enix. The player moves through a map of an enchanted forest, battling monsters using their own summoned monsters through a puzzle-game battle based on PopCap's Bejeweled Twist. In these battles, the player rotates groups of four in a grid of gems to line up three or more jewels of the same color; when enough lines have been created damage is dealt to the enemy. Between battles, a story is told through a series of cutscenes, while the player and the summoned monsters gain experience and power using role-playing elements.

The initial idea for the game was inspired by Puzzle Quest: Challenge of the Warlords, a 2007 video game which members of both companies were playing at the time. The game was proposed to Square Enix half-jokingly by PopCap's chief creative officer Jason Kapalka during a meeting between the two companies in 2007, and was released on the Xbox Live Arcade and on the Steam platform for Windows PCs by Square Enix on November 18, 2009. Gyromancer received a generally positive reception from reviewers. Critics took issue with perceived limited graphics, some aspects of the music, and a weak and confusing plot. Despite these flaws, in general they found the game to be fun and addictive, and to have a great deal of replay value.

== Gameplay ==
Example of gameplay during a battle; the player on the left is currently attacking the enemy on the right.

Players assume the role of Rivel, an immortal summoner who ventures through the enchanted Aldemona Wood. He has been tasked to track down the rebel group Temperance, led by Quraist Kingsley, who have assassinated a member of the royal family. The forest at times magically seals itself, trapping visitors inside, and is rumored to hold a source of mystical power for which Quraist is searching. The game consists of twelve stages, which are large branching maps that allow the player to move from points represented by stars to adjacent points. Each stage contains its own objectives, from defeating beasts that block the player's way, to solving puzzles before time runs out. Additional stages are available for purchase as downloadable content. There are multiple optional objectives per stage, in addition to a main goal. Many areas of each stage are initially blocked off, and can only be entered by replaying the stage later in the game.

While moving through the stages, the player encounters many monsters, and is forced to battle against them using one of their own monsters in a puzzle battle based on Bejeweled Twist. The creatures are "variations on fantasy archetypes" and include demons, giant spiders, giant frogs, and beasts inspired by Dungeons & Dragons. The player can only bring three creatures into a stage out of all of the ones that they have, and selects one of the three when a battle begins. A grid of different colored gems is displayed, and the player can select blocks of four jewels and rotate them clockwise. If a line of three or more identical gems is formed, the gems disappear, allowing all of the jewels above the now-vacant spaces in the grid to fall down a row to replace them. New gems appear at the top of the screen to fill any holes in the grid. If new lines of gems are formed from this movement, the process repeats. Whenever lines are formed, a gauge is filled slightly for the player; when it is full a special gem appears on the board. When that gem is formed into a line, damage is done to the enemy. The enemy also has a gauge, which is filled every time the player performs a rotation, and damage is dealt directly to the player when it is filled.

Later in the game, non-rotatable gems can be found, and the player is punished for rotations that do not lead to a match by having the enemy's gauge fill faster. The amount of damage that the player can take or deliver is dependent on the monster used in battle, and using a beast in battle earns experience points which can increase the power of that summon. Each monster has a corresponding color, and matching gems that are the same color as the player's chosen monster or the enemy makes the player's gauge fill faster or theirs slower. Enemy monsters can change gems on the board to skulls, which cause damage to the player if they are not lined up within a certain number of moves. After being defeated in a battle, enemy monsters are added to the list of creatures that the player chooses from when they start a stage. New monsters can also be found hidden in the stages, along with items that can be used during battles.

== Development ==
The game was first thought up in 2007 during a meeting between PopCap and Square Enix, which had published several of PopCap's games in Japan. Jason Kapalka, the co-founder and chief creative officer of PopCap, claims that he "half-jokingly" proposed a game collaboration between the two companies that would combine a role-playing game with Bejeweled-style gameplay, calling it "Final Fantasy Bejeweled". Kapalka was envisioning creating a similar game to Puzzle Quest: Challenge of the Warlords, a 2007 video game which members of the development staff of both companies were playing at the time. The idea attracted the attention of Yuichi Murasawa, designer of Final Fantasy Tactics Advance, and the game began formal development. To differentiate the game from Puzzle Quest, the gameplay was based around Bejeweled Twist rather than Bejeweled, which Kopalka feels fit the art design of the game more. Other candidates considered were Zuma and Peggle, but they were dropped as the developers felt that they did not fit in with the combat theme. PopCap developed the early prototype for the game, then allowed Square Enix to complete the bulk of the work in designing and creating the game, especially in regards to the RPG aspects. Square Enix and PopCap announced the game in September 2009. It was published by Square Enix on the Xbox Live Arcade and on the Steam platform for Windows PCs on November 18, 2009. A downloadable pack of maps and a pack of items were released after the game's launch on November 23, for both versions of the game.

Gyromancer was directed by Murasawa and produced by Yoshinori Kamei. The story was written by Kyoko Kitahara, who had previously worked on Final Fantasy Tactics Advance with Murasawa, and the art direction was led by Yuki Matsuzawa. The soundtrack was created by Tsuyoshi Sekito. Matsuzawa was asked to make the art style that of a "dark fantasy" and to focus more on making the visuals realistic rather than fantasy-oriented, so that it would appeal more to players outside Japan.

== Reception ==
Reception

Aggregate score
Aggregator	Score
Metacritic	PC: 71/100; X360: 75/100

Review scores
Publication	Score
Eurogamer	8/10
Game Informer	7.75/10
GameSpot	7.5/10
GameTrailers	7.6/10
IGN	8.3/10

Gyromancer received a generally positive reception from reviewers. While many critics noted its similarity to Puzzle Quest, the gameplay was still described as being "fun and addictive" by Brett Todd of GameSpot, and similar praises were made by Daemon Hattfield of IGN and Eurogamer's Oli Welsh. Welsh claimed that it had a great deal of replay value, and praised the "surprisingly varied story missions". Game Informer's Matt Miller disagreed slightly, stating that while the game had some replay value, it was limited by the lack of depth to the RPG elements of the game. Although the paintings of the monsters and game world were rated highly by critics, the art direction itself was criticized. Todd called the graphics "murky and grainy" and noted the lack of animation in the battles or cutscenes, in which two-dimensional pictures of the characters speaking "slide back and forth like cardboard cutouts" rather than perform realistic movements. Welsh added that the stage maps were "crudely portrayed". Hattfield did not share those concerns, but did note say that they felt that the portraits of monsters were reused for different monsters too often. Miller disagreed completely with the other critics, saying that the game "looks great" and that "even the map screen between battles has a polished appearance". A reviewer from GameTrailers also enjoyed the aesthetic of the game, saying that despite the "still images" and "simple effects", the game made an "effort to look and sound the part" of a deeper game, which they felt would increase the player's enjoyment.

The plot was similarly criticized, with Welsh calling it "endearing, largely unpronounceable rubbish", while Hattfield termed it "not Gyromancer's strong point" and "a bit hard to follow". Miller dismissed it as "generic" and "lackluster", while the GameTrailers reviewer said that it was "somewhat thrown together". All the reviews, however, noted that the plot was largely irrelevant to the game next to the gameplay elements. Todd criticized the tutorial system as very inadequate, as well as the "beyond cheesy" music, a criticism that Hattfield left only to the "Japanese videogame metal during boss battles", rather than the rest of Sekito's "rousing orchestral tunes". Overall, however, the reviewers felt that Gyromancer was a fun, casual game.
