= Skaven =

Skaven may refer to:

- Skaven (Warhammer), a race of anthropomorphic rat creatures in Games Workshop's Warhammer Fantasy setting
- Peter Hajba, a Finnish composer and graphics designer, nicknamed Skaven
