= Bejeweled (video game) =

2000 video game

- Cover art for the Windows edition
- Developer: PopCap Games
- Publishers: PopCap Games; Astraware; Electronic Arts
- Designer: Jason Kapalka
- Programmer: Brian Fiete
- Series: Bejeweled
- Platforms: Browser, Palm OS, Windows, Pocket PC, Mac OS X, Java ME, BREW, Windows Mobile, Xbox, iPod 5G, BlackBerry OS, Symbian
- Release: 2000: Browser; WW: 2000 Palm OS; WW: March 1, 2001 Windows; WW: May 30, 2001 Pocket PC; WW: August 26, 2001 Mac OS X; WW: June 28, 2002 Jave ME, BREW; WW: May 13, 2003 Windows Mobile; WW: May 3, 2004 Xbox; WW: November 6, 2004 iPod 5G; WW: September 12, 2006 BlackBerry OS, Symbian; WW: August 12, 2008
- Genre: Match-three
- Mode: Single-player

Bejeweled is a match-three video game developed and published by PopCap Games. Bejeweled involves lining up three or more multi-colored gems to clear them from the game board. The game was inspired by a similar browser game, titled Colors Game. Originally released in 2000 under the title Diamond Mine as a browser game on the team's official website, Bejeweled was licensed to be hosted on MSN Games under its current name. PopCap released a retail version titled Bejeweled Deluxe in May 2001.

Bejeweled has since been ported to many platforms, particularly mobile devices. The game has been commercially successful, having sold over 10 million copies and been downloaded more than 150 million times. It is credited with popularizing match-three video games and launching the casual games industry, which grew to be worth $3 billion within a decade. The game was followed by a commercially successful series of sequels and spin-offs.

== Gameplay ==
Bejeweled is a match-three video game. Gameplay centers around gaining points by swapping two adjacent gems within a tile-based grid to create lines of three or more matching gems, which will disappear and allow gems from above to fall and occupy the vacant space. If neither of the gems swapped create a line of three or more of the same gem, the two gems will revert to their original positions. Versions such as Bejeweled Deluxe have two game modes: untimed and timed. Untimed mode revolves around attempting to reach a high score and ends when no further matches are possible; timed mode involves trying to gain points to prevent a timer bar from reaching the end. JAMDAT's Bejeweled Multiplayer includes an additional multiplayer mode, in which opponents compete in timed one-on-one matches. During these matches, players can use special gems, such as bomb gems, to affect their opponent's gameplay.

== Development ==
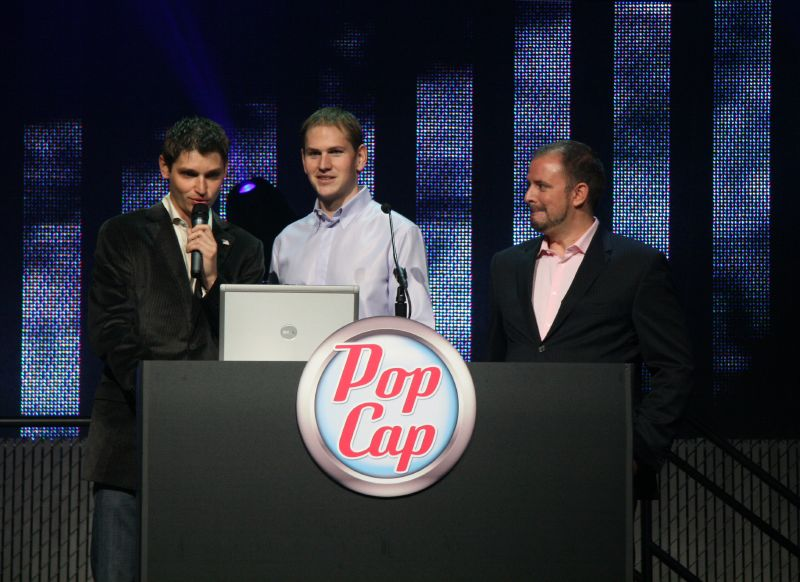
John Vechey, Brian Fiete, and Jason Kapalka (left to right; pictured in 2008) founded PopCap Games.

After a failed venture into online erotic video games with the strip poker simulator Foxy Poker (2000), the video game developer Sexy Action Cool shifted to developing simple video games to license to other companies. At the time, the company had consisted of its three cofounders: business manager John Vechey, programmer Brian Fiete, and designer Jason Kapalka. In April 2000, Vechey discovered a match-three browser game titled Colors Game, which was reportedly primitive. It used squares as graphics, required the webpage to be refreshed between moves to update the game, and did not have animation or sound effects. Finding the match-three mechanic addictive, the team was inspired to develop a more polished version of the game.

Though Kapalka considered using fruits or geometric shapes for the graphics, he ultimately picked gems, as the fruits lacked visual diversity and the shapes lacked visual appeal. The game, originally titled Diamond Mine after a song by the Canadian country rock band Blue Rodeo, had a cave mining theme before it was renamed to Bejeweled. It was initially time-based by default at the suggestion of other game developers such as Pogo.com, with the goal being to maximize one's score before the timer ran out. Though an untimed mode was only included as an afterthought to serve as a tutorial, it would become the main mode associated with Bejeweled upon positive feedback from players.

== Release ==
Diamond Mine was released for browsers in 2000, first appearing on Sexy Action Cool's website. The team offered Diamond Mine to Microsoft for $50,000 but were rejected; Microsoft instead offered to lease the game for $1,500 per month for their online gaming portal MSN Games. Microsoft requested that they rename the game to Bejeweled, due to Diamond Mine sounding similar to another game titled Diamond Mines. Kapalka conceded to the naming despite disliking its similarity to the 2000 film Bedazzled. As part of their deal, the team maintained ownership of Bejeweled and hosted it on their site, while Microsoft hosted the game on MSN Games and created versions sponsored by other companies such as Tyson Foods and the National Pork Board. After the deal, Sexy Action Cool was renamed to PopCap Games to make the brand more reflective of their new family-oriented target audience.

Though Bejeweled was successful on MSN Games, PopCap did not experience significant monetary revenue. To remedy this, PopCap considered selling a cheap retail version of Bejeweled. Astraware executive Howard Tomlinson suggested selling the game as shareware for $20, with the rationale that, for consumers, a cheap price would imply an inferior product. Around this time, Astraware ported Bejeweled to Palm personal digital assistants (Palm PDAs) on March 1, 2001. A retail version with graphical enhancements, titled Bejeweled Deluxe, was released for Microsoft Windows on May 30, 2001. The business model surrounding Bejeweled Deluxe and subsequent PopCap games was to provide both a free version to play online and a downloadable retail version with the option of a limited trial run before requiring payment to continue.

As PopCap became more successful, they planned to release their games to as many platforms as possible, including newly developing platforms such as mobile phones. Astraware ported Bejeweled to the Pocket PC on August 26, 2001, (Note: The Pocket PC port of Bejeweled was known as Diamond Mine until August 8, 2003.) and Windows Mobile on May 3, 2004. Bejeweled was packaged with another PopCap game, Alchemy, by MacPlay for the Mac OS X on June 28, 2002. JAMDAT Mobile released a multiplayer version of Bejeweled, titled Bejeweled Multiplayer, for Java ME and BREW on May 13, 2003. Bejeweled was released as a launch title for Xbox Live Arcade on the original Xbox on November 6, 2004, and for the iTunes store on the fifth generation iPod on September 12, 2006. In the lead-up to the release of the Apple App Store, PopCap created a version of Bejeweled compatible with iPhones to be played through the Safari browser on July 30, 2007.

In February 2006, Electronic Arts (EA) acquired JAMDAT, granting EA's subsidiary EA Mobile the rights to Bejeweled on mobile platforms, a license that would be extended through 2010, before EA acquired PopCap in July 2011. EA Mobile updated JAMDAT's version of Bejeweled with graphical enhancements, releasing it on May 18, 2007, in North America. On August 12, 2008, EA Mobile announced a deal with Handango to distribute ports of EA Mobile's games, including Bejeweled, on Windows Mobile, BlackBerry, and Symbian phones. EA Mobile added Bejeweled to BlackBerry App World on August 21, 2009.

== Reception ==
Bejeweled achieved success on MSN Games, becoming the number one game by traffic on the site within a month and maintaining that position until July 2002. Vechey estimated that Bejeweled peaked at 50,000 to 60,000 users on MSN Games. Bejeweled Deluxe was commercially successful, netting PopCap $30,000 to $40,000 per month after its release. By 2008, Bejeweled had been downloaded 150 million times, with Bejeweled Deluxe selling 10 million copies.

The lack of skill required to play Bejeweled led to it being ignored by reviewers. However, according to gaming journalist Harold Goldberg, the reviewers who appreciated Bejeweled "could feel a Zen peacefulness when playing", an experience comparable to Tetris. David Manning of Computer Gaming World wrote of the staff becoming transfixed with Bejeweled Deluxe, threatening the magazine's production. The addictiveness of Astraware's PDA versions were positively received by Maximum PC and Hyper. Bejeweled Multiplayer was praised by both IGN and GameSpot for its additions to the original Bejeweled, which they felt contributed to its entertainment value. IGN considered the Xbox Live port of Bejeweled fun but criticized its lack of multiplayer function. The iPod port of Bejeweled was criticized by IGN and Pocket Gamer for its controls, as the usage of the iPod's click wheel was seen as unintuitive for an otherwise fun game.

Computer Gaming World selected Bejeweled as the best puzzle game of 2001 and included the game in their Hall of Fame in 2005, becoming the only puzzle game alongside Tetris to be inducted. At the 2004 G-Phoria, hosted by G4techTV, Bejeweled Multiplayer won "Best Mobile Phone Game" among 500,000 online votes. In 2007, GamesRadar+ listed Bejeweled as a PC game that "shaped a generation", saying, "But not since Tetris has such a simple mechanic gripped so many for so long." Gameswelt (2012), Polygon (2017), and Game Informer (2018) have ranked Bejeweled as among the best video games of all time in their respective lists. In 2020, The Strong National Museum of Play inducted Bejeweled into the World Video Game Hall of Fame.

== Legacy ==
The popularity of Bejeweled is credited with the rise of the casual games industry in the 21st century. Kapalka attributes the rise to the exclusion of a default timer in Bejeweled, allowing for gaming that did not require skill. The commercial success of Bejeweled allowed PopCap to develop small casual games with high-production values to be ported on a wide range of platforms, as games such as Bookworm, Peggle, and entries of the Bejeweled series were developed for multiple years. The success and simplicity of Bejeweled and other games developed by PopCap influenced independent video game studios to invest in developing low-cost video games for high profits. As a result, within a decade, the casual games industry grew to be worth $3 billion. Bejeweled's influence led to it becoming the first mobile game inducted into the World Video Game Hall of Fame.

Bejeweled popularized the match-three genre of puzzle games; many such games have been accused of being Bejeweled clones and lacking innovation. Thousands of match-three video games have been released in the wake of Bejeweled, including over 2,200 match-three games on the Apple App Store as of February 2014. Some of these games, such as Candy Crush Saga (2012), have exceeded the popularity of Bejeweled. Developers such as King, Playrix, and Demiurge have created popular mobile games that tweak Bejeweled's match-three formula. For example, Demiurge's Puzzle Quest (2007) fuses match-three gameplay with role-playing game conventions, King's Candy Crush Saga (2012) includes power-ups and stylized levels, and Playrix's Gardenscapes (2016) involves renovating a garden through successful match-three rounds.

The Bejeweled series consists of two direct sequels and several spin-offs. Development of these entries, according to Kapalka, took years and were focused on improving upon the original formula. Of the direct sequels, Bejeweled 2 released in 2004 to mixed reviews, while Bejeweled 3 released in 2010 to positive reviews. Of the spin-offs, Bejeweled Twist released in 2008 and Bejeweled Blitz released in 2009 to positive reviews, while Bejeweled Stars released in 2016 to mixed reviews. The game series overall has been commercially successful; by 2010, Bejeweled, Bejeweled Twist, and Bejeweled Blitz collectively reached 50 million sales. Outside of the franchise, PopCap licensed a version of Bejeweled that can be played in World of Warcraft starting on September 25, 2008, and PopCap's Plants vs. Zombies (2009) contains a mini-game based on Bejeweled, titled "Beghouled".
