= Chuzzle =

2005 video game

- Developer: Raptisoft Games
- Publisher: PopCap Games
- Designer: John Raptis
- Engine: PopCap Games Framework
- Platforms: Windows, Mac OS X, Java ME, iOS, Android
- Release: May 12, 2005
- Genre: Puzzle
- Mode: Single-player

Chuzzle is a tile-matching puzzle video game developed by American studio Raptisoft Games and published by PopCap Games. The game involves connecting three or more fuzzballs named Chuzzles.

== Gameplay ==
In Chuzzle, the player is presented with a 6×6 board of multi-colored fuzzballs called "Chuzzles" coming in eight colors. Moves are made by dragging rows and columns. The rows and columns "wrap" when dragged off the grid; Chuzzles on the left reappear on the right and from top to bottom and vice versa.

The main goal of this game involves connecting three or more Chuzzles of the same color. When three or more Chuzzles are connected, the connected Chuzzles pop and fly off the board, in which new Chuzzles fall from the top of the board, potentially creating cascades. Popping several Chuzzles in a single move awards more points. Fat Chuzzles are larger variants of Chuzzles that appear when there is a free space of 2×2 squares after Chuzzles have been popped, taking up a space of 2×2 squares on the game board. Matching with a Fat Chuzzle provides more points to the player.

Connecting five Chuzzles of the same color will create a "Super Chuzzle" that explodes and pops Chuzzles in a 3×3 radius. Six or more Chuzzles will charge up the popped Chuzzles' eyes and fill up a great amount of the flask.

Eliminated Chuzzles' eyes fly into a flask to the left of the board. When the flask fills to its neck, the level ends, and bonus points are awarded (1,000 times the level number in Casual difficulty and 2,000 times the level number in Expert difficulty, up to a maximum of 10,000). The game features a Hint button that helps the player find a possible match at the cost of points and progress in the flask for each use.

The game features five game modes:

- Classic Chuzzle: Plays with the basic game rules. Locks will occasionally appear and connect to a Chuzzle, preventing the player from moving the row and column the lock is on. The lock can be destroyed by connecting the locked Chuzzle with two other Chuzzles. In later levels, locks will appear more frequently. Every time the game board runs out of moves, a scramble will be used up, resetting the board for a new one with no locks or Fat Chuzzles. The game ends once there are no more moves and no scrambles remaining. An extra scramble is awarded every 300,000 points.
- Speed Chuzzle: The game plays similarly to Classic Chuzzle, with the only difference being the presence of a lock timer. The lock timer will continuously fill up as long as the player does not pop Chuzzles. Popping Chuzzles pushes back the lock timer. The lock timer bar plays a warning chime when it is nearly full, and once it is filled up, a lock will appear on the game board. In later levels, the lock timer will fill up faster.
- Zen Chuzzle: An endless game mode where no locks appear so the board will never run out of moves. Instead of leveling up, filling the flask generates a Chuzzle that serves as a trinket. Five of them will create one strip of the rainbow. Completing the rainbow will reward a charm at the top of the game board each time.
- Mind Bender: Unlike the other game modes, Mind Bender involves attempting to line up Chuzzles to match the game board with the preset pattern shown on the left side of the screen. Mind Bender features 20 levels, each with five puzzles. Finishing at least three puzzles within a level unlocks the next level.
- BeChuzzed: A secret game mode unlocked by obtaining five specific trophies and viewing each one of them in a particular order. The game mode is a nod to PopCap's Bejeweled and features gems from Diamond Mine, the earliest version of Bejeweled. The gameplay here is a bit similar to Zen, in that locks will never appear, but progress will not be saved as there is no flask.

Various trophies are awarded to the player for certain accomplishments in the game. Examples include "Chuzzbomber", awarded for popping 1,000 Super Chuzzles, and "Speed Freak!", awarded for clearing two consecutive levels without getting a lock in Speed Chuzzle.

== Reception ==
Reception

Review scores
Publication	Score
Pocket Gamer	9/10 (Java ME)
PC Magazine	4/5
IGN	7.9/10 (Java ME)

In a brief review, PC Magazine called Chuzzle "addictive", giving the game a score of 4 out of 5. IGN reviewed the Java ME version of the game, concluding their review with a score of 7.9 out of 10. IGN felt that the title was very similar to existing "match three" offerings, although the "Mind Bender" mode provides some measure of uniqueness.

Pocket Gamer described Chuzzle Mobile as "the best mobile puzzler" they had played, praising the game's "addictive" gameplay, as well as the game's overall look and feel. During the 9th Annual Interactive Achievement Awards, Chuzzle was nominated for "Downloadable Game of the Year" by the Academy of Interactive Arts & Sciences.

== Sequels and spin-offs ==
In December 2018, Raptisoft independently published a sequel, Chuzzle 2, as a free-to-play app with removable ads on iOS and Android. Chuzzle 2 features an arcade-style progression system with several different goals. Additional features to the game include a virtual pet mode known as the Chuzzarium, a daily challenge mode, and the Classic, Zen, and Speed modes from the original Chuzzle as unlockables.

In August 2020, Raptisoft published a spin-off game, Chuzzle Snap, on iOS and Android. Unlike Chuzzle and Chuzzle 2, Chuzzle Snap involves using pre-determined pieces to place on the board instead of moving lines of Chuzzles, to remove three or more connected Chuzzles of the same color.
