= Word Worm =

2011 video game

- Developer: Hawk Industries, LLC.
- Publishers: Hawk Industries, LLC.
- Platforms: Android, iOS, Windows
- Release: February 18, 2011
- Genre: Puzzle
- Mode: Single player

Word Worm is an Android and iOS word game developed by American studio Hawk Industries, LLC.

== Gameplay ==
In Word Worm, the user forms words from adjacent tiles present in a rectangular grid. The game features two play modes: time trial, in which in the user must earn an increasing number of points in a two-minute interval to advance levels, and free play, where the user advances based on score alone. Bonus points can be earned by forming the bonus word. Similar to Bookworm, longer words, and words formed from less common letters result in more points. In both modes, fire tiles form randomly throughout gameplay. If a word is not formed using the fire tile, it burns through the letter below it. When a fire tile reaches the bottom of the screen, the game is over.

== Reception ==
Shortly after its initial release on February 18, 2011, Word Worm was selected by Google as a featured tablet application for Honeycomb. It received further publicity on February 23 when it was featured on the internet television show, Radio Android. Based on its initial success, Hawk Industries LLC. released versions for the iPhone and iPad in August 2011, for which it has also generally received positive reviews.

=== Awards ===
Word Worm has received several awards from fan websites. Android Police, ranked it one of the "37 best" games on Android. The Best Android Tablet voted it the second best game on android. Android journalist Ian Black of Appolicious selected Word Worm as the "Fresh App" for April 14, 2011.
