= Bejeweled 3 =

2010 video game

- North American Windows and OS X box art
- Developer: PopCap Games
- Publisher: PopCap Games
- Designers: Jason Kapalka; Brian Fiete; Josh Langley; Jeremy Bilas
- Composers: Peter Hajba; Alexander Brandon
- Series: Bejeweled
- Platform: List: Windows, Mac OS X, Nintendo DS, PlayStation 3, Xbox 360, iOS, Android, Windows Phone, Java ME, Android TV
- Release: December 7, 2010: Windows, OS X; December 7, 2010; Nintendo DS, PlayStation 3, Xbox 360; October 19, 2011; iOS; December 7, 2011; Android; December 19, 2014
- Genre: Puzzle
- Mode: Single-player

Bejeweled 3 is a tile-matching puzzle video game developed and published by PopCap Games. It is the fifth game in the Bejeweled series following Bejeweled Blitz (2010) and succeeds Bejeweled 2 (2004) as the latest mainline title in the Bejeweled series. It was released for Windows and Mac OS X on December 7, 2010, as part of the 10 Years of Bejeweled celebration, which celebrated the 10th anniversary of the original Bejeweled (2000); it was ported to several other consoles afterward.

Bejeweled 3 introduces several new elements to the mainline series, with some features from previous spin-off titles such as Bejeweled Twist and Bejeweled Blitz being integrated into the game, such as being able to match while other gems are falling, the replay feature, new special gems, an achievement and ranking system, and more.

== Gameplay ==
The main gameplay of Bejeweled 3, like previous installments in the series except Bejeweled Twist, involves swapping two adjacent gems to form a line of three or more gems of the same color. When this occurs, the gems disappear, and new randomly generated gems fall from above, with gems above being affected by gravity, potentially creating a chain reaction. Unlike previous entries, the player can now swap other gems while other gems are still falling. If the player cannot find a match, they can use the Hint button to find a match. Unlike previous entries, there is no penalty for using the Hint button, although there is now a cooldown.

Gameplay of the game's Lightning Mode, featuring elements from Bejeweled Blitz

Matching four gems in a row creates a Flame Gem, which explodes and destroys the eight gems surrounding it when matched. Matching gems in an L, T, or + shape creates a Star Gem, similar to the Lightning Gem in Bejeweled Twist, which destroys all the gems in its row and column when matched. Matching five gems in a row creates a Hyper Cube, which detonates all gems of the color when swapped off the board. Like Bejeweled Blitz, it now activates when it is destroyed by a Special Gem while swapping it with another Hyper Cube destroys all the gems on the board. A match of six or more gems (which is only possible through a chain reaction) creates a Supernova Gem, which destroys all the gems on its row and column in a 3x3 area.

Game improvements include the Instant Replay feature from Bejeweled Twist, advanced animation transitions, animated backgrounds, and 3D acceleration. Bejeweled 3 features an achievement system known as Badges, of which are obtained after certain benchmarks.

Bejeweled 3 features eight game modes, four of which are available from the start and four of which are unlocked after reaching certain objectives. Unlike Bejeweled 2, the difficulty of unlocking each game mode has been reduced drastically, and the objective for unlocking each game is now displayed directly on the menu. The number of game modes present varies between platforms.

- Classic is the main and standard gameplay mode. Like previous installments of the main series, it involves attempting to score as many points as possible before running out of valid moves. Once the progress bar is filled, it advances the player to the next level, where the player receives more points but requires more points to proceed to the next.
- Zen is an endless variation of the Classic game mode. But unlike Classic, it is impossible to run out of moves. New gameplay elements to this mode include a unique theme and soundtrack, and Zen Options, which enable several player soothing options such as breathing indicators and sounds, subliminal messages that display on the game board and progress bar, ambient sounds, and binaural beats, which use a wide variety of aural tones emitted from headphones to trick the human brain into hearing different sound frequencies.
- Lightning is the game's timed mode, which involves attempting to score as many points as possible within a one-minute time limit. Matching Time Gems adds extra time to the Time Extension tank, which activates and replenishes up to one minute once time runs out, in which the current score multiplier is also increased. The game mode also features the "Speed Bonus" and "Blazing Speed" bonus from Bejeweled Blitz, which activates if the player makes consecutive matches at a rapid pace. In the HTML5 version of the game, the game mode is referred to as Speed.
- Quest is a mini-game based mode that involves completing 40 different quests to restore the five Lost Relics of Bejeweled (referred to as the Lost Treasures of Bejeweled in the Nintendo DS version), which have been darkened over time. The quests vary in gameplay, such as rescuing butterfly gems, digging for gold, battling ice storms, uncovering buried treasure, and many more.
- Poker is a secret game mode, which is also an endless variation of the Poker mini-quest from Quest. The game mode involves attempting to make as many high-scoring hands as possible before they land on a skull-marked hand. Matching a gem adds that gem's color to one of five hands. When all five hands are filled with gems, the hand is evaluated, and points are awarded depending on the hand they achieved. For example, the Flush, consisting of five hands of the same color, is the best possible hand in the game mode. Creating a Flame or Star Gem engulfs the respective card in flames or stars, awarding extra points (100 for Flame cards, 250 for Star cards). Creating a Hyper Cube gives the player a Wild Card that automatically changes color to provide the best possible hand. After several hands, a skull mark will land on the lowest hand, meant to be avoided. Creating a hand marked by a skull will initiate a coin flip, resulting in a 50/50 chance of the game continuing. If the coin lands on the clover, the game continues. If the coin lands on the Skull, the game ends. Making hands fills up the Skull Eliminator bar, which eliminates a skull from the hand table when filled. This game mode is unlocked when Level 5 in Classic is reached.
- Butterflies is a secret game mode, which is also an endless variation of the Butterflies mini-quest from Quest. The game mode involves attempting to match butterfly gems generated from the bottom of the board by matching and detonating them with Special Gems before they reach the Spider Gem on the top of the board. It is unlocked by reaching level 5 in Zen.
- Ice Storm is a secret game mode, which is also an endless variation of the Ice Storm mini-quest from Quest. The game mode involves attempting to destroy rising ice columns by matching gems on the ice columns they overlay. Making horizontal matches will push the columns down, and making vertical matches will destroy the columns. Lowering/destroying ice columns fills up a water tank, increasing the current score multiplier and pushing down all ice columns when filled. If an ice column reaches the top of the board, a skull will appear on the top of the column, and an "internal" ice column begins to rise on the inside, ending the game if it reaches the top and is not lowered after a few seconds, causing the game board to freeze. Lowering an ice column eliminates the internal ice column. The game mode is unlocked by scoring at least 100,000 points in Lightning. In the Chinese version of the game, players can create chains at a fast pace to gain a "Blazing Speed bonus".
- Diamond Mine is a secret game mode, which is also an endless variation of the Gold Rush mini-quest from Quest. The game mode involves attempting to dig out as much treasure as possible before time runs out. Matching gems next to dirt removes the dirt, allowing space for more gems to fall. When all dirt is dug above the white line, the game board begins moving deeper into the earth, bringing dirt back up to the game board and adding extra time (30 seconds in most versions, 25 seconds in Bejeweled Classic). Clearing all dirt off the board at once awards the player a lot more extra time (90 seconds normally, 70 in Bejeweled Classic). Rocks require extra matches to dig completely, while Dark Rocks, found later in the game, can only be destroyed by the detonation of Special Gems. Treasure acts as the point system in this game mode. It consists of gold, diamonds, and artifacts. Deeper levels of depth feature more valuable treasures that award many points. This mode is unlocked when four quests in Quest mode are completed.
- The Time Bomb modes (Time Bomb and Match Bomb) are two game modes that appear exclusively in the Chinese re-release of this game. They are both endless variations of the Time Bomb mini-quests from Quest and available from the start. The game modes involve attempting to destroy the randomly generating Bomb Gems from the board before their counters reach 0. The counters on the bombs decrease every move in Match Bomb, while it decreases every second in Time Bomb. If a Bomb Gem reaches 0, it explodes and ends the game. In Time Bomb, players can make fast chains to achieve a "Speed Bonus" and "Blazing Speed".

== Development ==
Bejeweled 3's game trailer appeared on its YouTube channel in October 2010, followed by its announcement by PopCap Games on November 1, regarding the game's development and release date.

Jason Kapalka, co-founder and chief creative officer at PopCap and co-creator of Bejeweled, said: "The challenge in creating a new version of Bejeweled is to innovate and keep it fresh and exciting without losing touch with the gameplay that millions of people love. So we're very careful when we make changes to the core game, which is why it can take so long! [...] We've worked hard to make sure Bejeweled 3 retains the classic appeal of the earlier games while bringing a host of exciting new features to the table".

PopCap considered premiering the game's Zen Mode as a tool to help people quit smoking, where the player would be given hints during the gameplay on how to deal with their addiction. However, PopCap eventually decided to remove the feature because if the game discussed smoking, its ESRB rating would claim it contained "tobacco use". The references to smoking were replaced with a more general "bad habits" section.

The mobile version of Bejeweled 3 and Bejeweled Classic was updated periodically between the original release of the game and 2018.

== Release ==
Bejeweled 3 was originally released on December 7, 2010 for PC. The game was later ported to consoles and mobile devices.

The Adobe Flash Player version features only the Classic game mode and is mostly based on the Bejeweled Blitz engine. An HTML5 version of the game, simply titled Bejeweled, was released on December 13, 2011, for the Chrome Web Store and featured the Classic and Lightning (known as Speed) game modes. A version for Windows 8, titled Bejeweled Live, was released on March 30, 2013, on the Windows 8 Store, and included only the Classic, Butterflies, and Diamond Mine game modes.

An enhanced re-release of the game was made available exclusively in mainland China on July 27, 2012, sharing the same title as the international release. The re-release featured two extra game modes based on the Time Bomb mini-quests in Quest, several gameplay tweaks, such as Blazing Speed activating earlier, the game being restricted to only 4:3, and advertisements. Many community members have commonly nicknamed this release Bejeweled 3 Plus to differentiate it from the original version.

Bejeweled 3 was released on April 24, 2011, for the PlayStation Network, and on October 19, 2011, for Xbox Live Arcade. The game was released to retailers on November 15, 2011, for Xbox 360, PlayStation 3, and Nintendo DS. The retail version of the game for Xbox 360 comes with Bejeweled Blitz LIVE, and the retail version for PlayStation 3 includes 2 of PopCap's other titles, Feeding Frenzy 2 and Zuma.

The Xbox 360 version of Bejeweled 3 is also playable on Xbox One and Xbox Series X and Series S, and is included as a game on the EA Play subscription service.

Bejeweled 3 was released for iOS under the title Bejeweled on December 8, 2011. It would be released for Android on December 19, 2014. The iOS version originally included 4 of the game's 8 game modes, but later updates would add the other game modes. In 2015, the app was renamed Bejeweled Classic to differentiate it with the then-upcoming Bejeweled Stars. An iPad and Android tablet version of the game, Bejeweled Classic HD (originally Bejeweled HD) was released in 2012. Exclusive features to these versions include exclusive badges and Boosts that can help the player during gameplay. Boosts can be obtained by watching advertisements or can be purchased in the form of microtransactions.

The game would also release for Windows Phone 7 on October 10, 2010, as Bejeweled Live. (not to be confused with the game of the same name for Windows 8). It had similar gameplay to the iOS version of Bejeweled 2. Bejeweled 3 would also go on to re-release for Windows Phone 8 and Nokia Lumia on February 18, 2013, under the title Bejeweled LIVE+.

The PC version of the game was ported to select Chinese Android-based TVs by the now-defunct company Transmension Games, which earlier released complete ports of other PopCap games such as Bejeweled 2, Peggle, Zuma, Feeding Frenzy 2 and Plants vs. Zombies. This version supports gamepads and remote controls. It was unofficially localized to English and can be played with a touch screen on Android phone and tablets.

== Nominations and awards ==
During the 14th Annual Interactive Achievement Awards, the Academy of Interactive Arts & Sciences nominated Bejeweled 3 for "Casual Game of the Year".
