= Rocket Mania! =

2003 video game

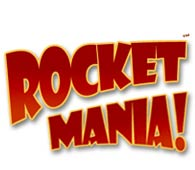
- Developer: Nuclide Games
- Publisher: PopCap Games
- Designer: Luc Van den Borre
- Engine: PopCap Games Framework
- Platforms: Windows, Windows Mobile, Palm OS
- Release: August 15, 2003
- Genre: Puzzle
- Mode: Single-player

Rocket Mania! is a puzzle video game by Belgian studio Nuclide Games, published by PopCap Games.

== Gameplay ==
The player rotates fuse segments to launch fireworks.

The Rocket Mania playfield consists of a grid of fuse tiles, with lit matches and fireworks rockets lining the left and right edges, respectively. The player must launch rockets by rotating the tiles to create an unbroken path connecting these two edges. Once a fuse is lit, all tiles along its route disappear (including any in branching paths that do not lead to rockets), any tiles above them drop into the open spaces, and new ones fall from above to refill the grid. Multiple simultaneous launches are possible due to three-way and four-way branching tiles. Bombs appear at times and can be used to destroy all nearby tiles/items within a set radius, while gems award bonus points; these must be picked up by burning the fuse tiles on which they are placed, as must clocks, coins, and matches (see below).

The player scores points for launching rockets, with bonuses awarded for five or more launched at once. Throughout the game and/or at its end, the player is assigned a rank based on score, intended to represent their advancement through the field of pyrotechnics.

Three modes of play are available, each with three difficulty settings.

=== Classic Mode ===
Classic Mode is played in levels, each of which begins with a new grid of fuse tiles and requires the player to launch a minimum number of rockets within a set time limit (indicated by a row of lanterns across the top of the screen). Launching multiple rockets at once causes coins to fall onto the field; collecting five coins allows a rocket to be upgraded by one level, starting at 1 and ending at 10. Once all rockets have been fully upgraded, the player scores bonus points for every additional coin collected. Picking up a clock freezes the timer briefly. Higher-level rockets award more points when launched, and the value of a launch increases when multiple coins are collected at the same time.

If the player fails to launch the required number of rockets before time runs out, the game ends and the player receives points for any unused coins.

=== Arcade Mode ===
Arcade Mode has no timer and begins with an empty grid, into which tiles fall one at a time. The player can slide tiles left and right in addition to rotating them, but must prevent the tiles from stacking up to the top edge. If any column fills completely and the player fails to make room for the next incoming tile above it, the game ends.

=== Strategy Mode ===
Strategy Mode has no timer or coins and begins with a full grid of fuse tiles. The player is given a limited number of matches at the outset, using one every time an unbroken left-to-right path is made. Additional matches fall onto the field after every launch of three or more rockets; once a match appears, the player must collect it within the next three launches before it vanishes. The game ends once all matches are used.

== Reception ==
GameZone awarded the Windows version of the title a 9.2 (out of 10) and an "Editor's Choice" award, concluding that it is easy to pick up, addictive, and able to keep one entertained for hours. While the reviewer at GameZone enjoyed the way the difficulty level slowly ramped up, GameSpot felt that the game was a little too simple and that there wasn't any real challenge until the later levels. As such, GameSpot scored the title as only 6.7 (out of 10), although some positive aspects which were noted included an easy control scheme and a decent variety of modes.

The editors of Computer Gaming World nominated Rocket Mania for their 2003 "Puzzle Game of the Year" award, which ultimately went to Bookworm.
