= Bonnie's Bookstore =

2005 video game

- Developer: New Crayon Games
- Publisher: PopCap Games
- Designer: Phil Steinmeyer
- Platforms: Windows, Macintosh
- Release: November 28, 2005
- Genre: Puzzle
- Mode: Single-player

Bonnie's Bookstore is a word-forming puzzle video game developed by New Crayon Games and published by PopCap Games. On each level, tiles containing one (or in some cases, two) letters are arranged in a specific structure. As in the similar title Bookworm, players use adjacent letters to form valid words, with points being awarded based on the length of the word. In most cases, once a letter is used, it is removed from the board, with existing letters moving downwards and new letters filling in from the top.

== Plot ==
Screen capture featuring hare sleeping, based on "The Tortoise and the Hare"

In Bonnie's Bookstore, the titular character runs a bookstore which she has inherited from her deceased grandfather. One day while cleaning the attic, she discovers a series of paintings apparently created by him. The paintings appear to depict scenes from popular children's stories. In a flash of inspiration, Bonnie decides to become an author, writing updated versions of these classic stories while using her grandfather's paintings as the illustrations.

Each of the 50 stages in the game represents a chapter in a book. After completing a certain number of chapters, Bonnie finishes the book she's working on, receiving a congratulatory letter from her publisher and moving on to the next. Bonnie writes a variety of tales, especially fairy tales. Usually, each book is three-four chapters long (except others is five chapters long).

In order to complete a given level or stage, Bonnie must use a letter from each physical location of the board. Creating a word with a tile which has not previously been used causes the color of the tile at that position to change. Bonnie has only a limited number of turns or moves (with each word consuming one turn) to use every tile position on the board. Creating a word with 6 or more letters adds an extra turn for each letter after 5 letters and a wildcard star (7 or more letters create a rainbow wildcard star). At higher difficulty levels, more points are awarded, but the allowed number of turns decreases. It has scramble button but contains block tile and lose one turn otherwise.

In Action mode, timer is added and had to think time since it will consume fast. Also scramble button when pressed lose 4 seconds of time and adds block tile.

The gameplay has gimmicks, such as writer's block that blocks a path and when it reach below it fall down and disappear, then a letter changer that change letter continuously (and can be done by submitted a word that is letter arranged like BELT), rainbow letters that restricted only one letter, tile changer (reversible) that repeats colored tile from yellow to green, copycat letter that copies the last letter after submitted (can be done by two same letters like SEED), and pair letters like 'Le' and 'Be' are included to trick gameplay strategy, locks that can be unlocked by word submission and wildcard star that uses once, while rainbow wildcard star uses again and again.

== Reception ==
The website Gamezebo remarked that despite similarities with existing titles (including PopCap's own Bookworm), Bonnie's Bookstore redeemed itself through engaging and challenging gameplay. As a result, it received a score of 3.5 out of 5. The reviewer at GameDaily likened the title to Scrabble, but found the gameplay both rewarding and addictive, landing it a "Perfect 10" score.
