= AstroPop =

2004 video game

- Xbox Live Arcade cover art
- Developer: PopCap Games
- Publishers: PopCap Games; Sorrent (mobile)
- Designers: Sukhbir Sidhu; Jason Kapalka
- Engine: PopCap Games Framework
- Platforms: PlayStation 2, Xbox, Adobe Flash, Windows, Xbox 360, Mobile
- Release: April 6, 2004
- Genre: Puzzle
- Mode: Single-player

AstroPop (also written as astRO POP) is a 2004 puzzle video game developed and published by PopCap Games. The Adobe Flash version can be played online for free at several different websites, or a deluxe version can be downloaded and unlocked for a fee. The game was available for Xbox and Xbox 360 through Xbox Live Arcade. AstroPop was ported over to the PlayStation 2 in 2007 alongside another PopCap game, Bejeweled 2 which was released as a two-game compilation pack as PopCap Hits! Volume 1. The game has also been ported to cell phones.

== Gameplay ==
The object of the game is to clear a certain number of bricks in each level in order to fill up the Brick-O-Meter. Players control a ship which moves horizontally along the bottom of the screen. The ship can grab and release bricks (up to 6 of the same-colored bricks at a time), moving them from one column to another. If the player releases bricks such that 4 of more bricks of the same color are touching, the bricks explode. As bricks explode, the bricks below move up to fill in the gaps. If this causes 4 or more bricks of the same color to meet, they too will automatically explode (referred to as a combo).

New rows of bricks continuously arrive from the top of the screen, at a rate directly proportional to the level of play. The game ends when any column of bricks touches the bottom, if the bricks touches those that the player is holding, or they touch the player's character (as such it is possible to trigger a game over without an alarm or siren appearing but only the columns of bricks moving serving as a warning for the former and the bricks cannot really reach the bottom-most row of the screen for the last two cases).

== Reception ==
Reception

Review scores
Publication	Score
GameSpot	Mobile: 8.5/10; PC: 7.8/10
TeamXbox	8/10

Most reviews of the game indicated that, while somewhat similar to existing offerings, it offered enough new elements to be worth playing. In a review of the Xbox 360 version, TeamXbox said AstroPop offers fun gameplay and design that justifies the purchase. GameSpot, reviewing the mobile version of the title, felt that it played well and that it "should appeal to virtually every mobile gamer out there", resulting in a score of 8.5 out of 10.
