= Pizza Frenzy =

2005 video game

- Developer: PopCap Games (formerly by Sprout Games)
- Publisher: PopCap Games (previously by GameHouse)
- Designers: James Gwertzman, Del Chafe and Ed Allard and Jacob (Iaco) ChubChaser
- Platform: Windows
- Release: February 2, 2005
- Genre: Time management
- Mode: Single-player

Pizza Frenzy is a 2005 time management video game developed by Sprout Games and published by PopCap Games.

== Gameplay ==
The objective of Pizza Frenzy is to quickly deliver pizzas to the correct customers. The game levels take place in a number of different locations, with each location having a unique topography, including pizza kitchens. Each of these kitchens is responsible for producing and delivering pizzas with a specific topping. During gameplay, customers will appear with an icon representing a specific pizza topping they are calling to order. This icon must be clicked, then clicked on the pizza kitchen with the matching topping to dispatch the ordered pizza to the customer. If the player takes too long or takes the order to the wrong kitchen, the customer hangs up the phone, causing a decrease in overall customer satisfaction (represented by stars). If customer satisfaction ever drops to the point where there are no stars remaining, the game ends.

Before the start of a level, the player picks which pizza toppings will be available for order on that level. The number of kitchens varies by level, but ranges from two to four. The actual topping selection for a kitchen has no impact on the overall gameplay, other than that higher level toppings earn more money and allow multiple deliveries for that same topping at once. Toppings can be leveled up by achieving a combo for that topping, with the resulting upgrade carried over to all future playthroughs. After a certain number of levels are completed, the player can unlock new toppings that can be used for all future playthroughs. The new toppings from which the player can choose greatly vary, from typical pizza toppings (e.g. olives and mushrooms) to fancier toppings, even those not associated with pizza (e.g. donuts, chocolate and French fries).

After a few initial game levels, some percentage of the callers placing orders are actually criminals intent on hurting the pizza business. These include thieves, prank callers and vandals. If the player mistakenly takes an order from such an individual, there will be negative effects, such as a loss of tip money, a missed order or a decrease in customer satisfaction. Instead, the player must move the order to a police station when such a caller is observed, allowing the police to arrest the caller and providing a monetary reward. Although it can be difficult to spot criminals amidst the fast-paced flurry of mouse clicks, their presence is often alerted by a distinct auditory cue similar to a police radio.

The game also includes callers who have beneficial effects when their orders are successfully taken. Such callers include a movie star who gives huge tips, a gossip talker who gets other waiting customers to change their orders to match hers, a clown who causes other waiting customers to change their orders randomly, a banker who collects tips for the player for a brief period of time and a monk who causes time to temporarily slow down. Much like the police, these unique callers have their own auditory cues upon appearing.

There are three game modes available: "Speed", "Memory" and "Simon Says". Speed is the standard game mode, where the player has to complete orders before customers hang up their phone. This mode also allows the player to hold multiple orders of the same topping at once, provided the topping in question is upgraded. In Memory, the player is presented to a set number of orders at once. These orders are revealed for a few seconds before they can be clicked on, requiring the player to memorize the topping of each particular order. In Simon Says, the player gets to deliver a series of orders appearing in a particular order, with the challenge being to memorize which order appeared first using a visual cue as a hint.

== Reception ==
Reception

Review scores
Publication	Score
GameSpot	7.4/10
PC Zone	45/100

The GameSpot review of the title praised its uniqueness and sense of humor, while noting that it rarely reaches the titular frenzied level of action, instead displaying a lack of sustained difficulty. Nonetheless, the reviewer did appreciate the game's music and art style. PC Zone stated that Pizza Frenzy is "an extremely shallow if well presented dish".
