= Bejeweled (series) =

Video game series

- Genre: Puzzle
- Developer: PopCap Games
- Publishers: PopCap Games; Electronic Arts
- Creator: Jason Kapalka
- Platforms: Microsoft Windows; Xbox 360; Windows Phone; Windows Mobile; Mac OS X iOS; Android; PlayStation 3 PlayStation Portable; Nintendo DS; Wii; Java ME; Adobe Flash; Palm OS; Symbian^3; PlayStation Vita; Online; Arcade
- First release: Bejeweled; 2000
- Latest release: Bejeweled Champions; September 9, 2020
- Spin-offs: Bejeweled Twist, Bejeweled Blitz, Bejeweled Stars

Bejeweled is a series of tile-matching puzzle video games created by PopCap Games. Bejeweled was released initially for browsers in 2000, followed by seven sequels: Bejeweled 2 (2004), Bejeweled Twist (2008), Bejeweled Blitz (2009), Bejeweled 3 (2010), Bejeweled Legend (2012, in Japan only), Bejeweled Stars (2016), and Bejeweled Champions (2020) all by PopCap Games and its parent, Electronic Arts. More than 10 million copies of Bejeweled have been sold, and the game has been downloaded more than 350 million times. By February 2010, Bejeweled sales hit 50 million. The figure includes the original game, plus the Blitz and Twist versions. An arcade version was released in Q3 2013.

== Games ==
Release timeline
2000	Bejeweled
2001–2003
2004	Bejeweled 2
2005–2007
2008	Bejeweled Twist
2008	Bejeweled Blitz
2009
2010	Bejeweled 3
2011
2012	Bejeweled Legend
2013–2015
2016	Bejeweled Stars
2017–2019
2020	Bejeweled Champions

Main series

- Bejeweled (2000)
- Bejeweled 2 (2004)
- Bejeweled 3 (2010)

Spin-offs

- Bejeweled Twist (2008)
- Bejeweled Blitz (2010)
- Bejeweled Legend (2012) (Japan only)
- Bejeweled Stars (2016)
- Bejeweled Champions (2020)

== Influence ==
Bejeweled was directly influenced by a web-based game called "Colors Game" (1999), with possible indirect inspiration from games such as Shariki, Tetris Attack, and Columns, although the extent of their impact on Bejeweled's design remains a subject of speculation.

The popularity of Bejeweled has spawned several clones. Collectively known as match three games, these games revolve around the mechanics of creating three-in-a-row combinations of identical pieces.

== Legacy ==
After the release of Bejeweled, the game has been ported to many platforms, including cellphones, smartphones, game consoles, plug and plays, in-flight entertainment displays, and more. The series would be subject to several non-video game products including casino machines, three board games from Hasbro, a web series based on the characters Snackers and Anchovy from Bejeweled Blitz and more.

On September 25, 2008, Bejeweled was officially released as a free addon for the fantasy MMORPG World of Warcraft, alongside Peggle. In addendum to the standard 'Classic' (Normal) and 'Timed' modes, the addon has an exclusive 'Flight' mode, wherein the game begins when the player takes a flight from one in-game location to another, with the goal to score as high as possible before they reach their destination. The WoW addon adds achievements to the game, as well as a levelling system.

In 2014, Bejeweled and Candy Crush Saga (along with many other similar match three games) were proved to be NP-hard.

Bejeweled is often considered an important part of the match-3 genre. The series had won multiple awards. By 2013, PopCap estimates that over 10 billion hours of the game had been played on over 500 million downloaded copies. In 2020, Bejeweled was inducted into the World Video Game Hall of Fame.
