= Bejeweled 2 =

2004 puzzle video game

- Developers: PopCap Games; Oberon Media (Xbox 360); Astraware (Windows Mobile)
- Publishers: PopCap Games; Sony Online Entertainment (PSN); Electronic Arts (Android)
- Designer: Jason Kapalka
- Composer: Peter Hajba
- Series: Bejeweled
- Engine: PopCap Framework
- Platforms: Windows macOS; Browser; Flash; PDA Palm OS; Windows Mobile iOS; Xbox 360 (XBLA) iPod; PlayStation 2 PlayStation 3 (PSN); PlayStation Portable; WiiWare; Symbian^3; Android; BlackBerry PlayBook
- Release: November 16, 2004: Windows; NA: November 16, 2004 XBLA; NA: November 22, 2005; EU: December 2, 2005 iPod classic; NA: September 12, 2006 iOS (discontinued); NA: July 3, 2008 PlayStation 2; NA: May 24, 2007; EU: July 17, 2007 PlayStation 3; NA: January 29, 2009; EU: May 19, 2009 WiiWare; NA: June 14, 2010; EU: December 31, 2010 iOS (iPad-optimized) (discontinued); NA: June 1, 2010; PAL: May 29, 2010; JP: 2011 PlayStation Portable; NA: June 28, 2010 Android; WW: February 19, 2011
- Genre: Puzzle
- Mode: Single-player

Bejeweled 2 (also referred to as Bejeweled 2 Deluxe in some releases) is a tile-matching puzzle video game developed and published by PopCap Games. Released as a sequel to Bejeweled (2000), Bejeweled 2 introduces new game mechanics, such as Special Gems and extra game modes, along with new visuals and sounds.

The game was originally released on November 15, 2004, and has been ported to several platforms following its release, including game consoles, smartphones and in-flight entertainment services.

== Gameplay ==
Like its predecessor, Bejeweled 2 involves swapping two adjacent gems to form a line of three or more gems of the same color. When three gems are lined up, they disappear and cause randomly generated gems to fall from the top to take the matched gems' place. Sometimes, falling gems automatically line up, causing chain reactions. If the player is unable to find a match, the player can use the Hint button to find an available match at the cost of several points. They can also wait several seconds for an automatic Hint feature to trigger without penalty.

Creating matches of four or more gems will create powered-up gems known as Special Gems. When four gems are matched at once, or when the player makes two matches in an L, T, or + shape, a Power Gem is created, which destroys the eight gems surrounding it when matched. When a match of five or more gems is made, a Hypercube is created, which destroys all gems of the swapped gem's color from the board.

Two other gems also appear in the Puzzle, Cognito, and Finity modes. Rocks are solid objects that cannot be matched but can be destroyed using special gems. Bombs have a green numerical counter on them that decreases every move. When it depletes to 0, it explodes similarly to the Power Gem.

Bejeweled 2 features several different gameplay modes. Four (or five if the hidden Original mode is counted) game modes are available from the start, and the secret game modes (Twilight, Hyper, Cognito, and Finity) are unlocked after reaching specific benchmarks in each of the game modes. If a secret game mode is discovered, a question mark button will appear on the main menu screen, which shows the secret game modes.

- The Classic mode involves attempting to score as many points as possible before the player runs out of legal moves. Scoring points will fill up the progress bar at the bottom of the screen. When it is filled, they advance to the next level, where the base score is multiplied by the current level's number, with the points needed to level up increases every level. The game ends when there are no more possible moves.
- The Action mode features similar gameplay to Classic, with the progress bar acting as a timer. The timer bar slowly retracts as the player does not make matches. Making matches fills up the timer bar. In later levels, the timer bar drains faster. If it drains completely, the game ends. Unlike Classic, the player cannot run out of moves.
- The Puzzle mode involves attempting to clear all gems off several boards. Puzzle features 80 puzzles, each of which is divided into 16 "planets", each planet having five puzzles. The player progresses as they complete puzzles. When four puzzles are completed on a single planet, the player is allowed to progress to the next planet, though the player can complete the remaining puzzle to complete the planet. If the player makes a mistake or runs out of moves, they can use the Undo function to undo their previous move. Additionally, the player can use the Hint function. Reaching the end of the 16th planet will play a credits sequence. In the iOS and Android versions of the game, this mode is completely absent.
- The Endless mode, as its name implies, is an endless variant of the Classic mode. The player can never run out of moves, but can play for as long as they want. Unlike Classic, the score count remains constant and does not multiply. Specific versions of the game (such as the computer and console versions of the game) feature a diamond collecting system, in which the player collects a diamond for every level they complete.
- The Blitz mode, which only appears in the iOS version of Bejeweled 2, is a port of Bejeweled Blitz, added in a later update to the application. Blitz involves scoring as many points as possible in one minute. Like its web counterpart and Bejeweled Blitz, it features several gimmicks which appear only in this mode, such as Star Gems, Coins, Boosts, and Facebook integration.
- The Twilight mode is a secret game mode that plays similarly to Classic but with the gravity of the gems altering every move and gameplay being slower. It is unlocked by reaching Level 18 in Classic.
- The Hyper mode is a secret game mode, a faster version of Action. Making matches quickly will give players extra points. It is unlocked by reaching Level 9 in Action.
- The Cognito mode is a secret game mode and score-based version of Puzzle mode, where the player must score as many points as possible before they complete all 80 puzzles from the Puzzle mode. Some puzzles have altered colors or are flipped from the original versions. If a Hint is used, the player will not earn points for the puzzle on which they used a hint. Completing four puzzles without hints will let the player proceed to the next level, where they will receive more points. The game ends once all 80 puzzles are completed. It is unlocked after completing all 80 puzzles in Puzzle.
- The Finity mode is a secret game mode that plays similarly to the Action mode. The timer bar decreases slower; however, points are only awarded from the detonation of special gems. The Rock and Bomb gems appear in this mode. If no moves are possible, the current board is discarded, and a new set of gems appear. The mode is unlocked by reaching level 281 in Endless.
- The Original mode is a hidden game mode. The game mode plays similar to Classic, except the player cannot create special gems, which makes gameplay similar to its predecessor. Although it's available from the start, it is not directly displayed on the main menu. It is accessed by hovering over the four game mode buttons clockwise eight times on the main menu.

Some versions of the game, such as the WiiWare, iOS, Android, and in-flight entertainment versions of the game lack secret game modes.

== Development ==
Development on Bejeweled 2 began sometime around 2002. The PopCap team commenced work on a sequel to Bejeweled and wanted to add several new features to make it unique. Ideas such as Special Gems were conceptualized throughout the development of the game. At one point, the Rocks and Bombs from Puzzle were originally meant to appear in the other game modes but were limited to Puzzle only to prevent the game from becoming unappealing. The development team also decided to minimize the game's UI to make it easier to use, as the first game had a single-screen UI to prevent large file sizes. This game is the first to feature a recurring sci-fi theme throughout the series, which would appear in various Bejeweled games following until the full release of Bejeweled Blitz. According to game designer Jason Kapalka, the game's sci-fi theme mainly originated due to his interest in the Mojoworld rendering software, where the game's planetary backdrops would also originate.

Like the first game, the music of the game was composed by Skaven.

== Release ==
Bejeweled 2 was originally released for PCs on November 5, 2004. A version for Windows Mobile, Pocket PC, and Palm OS was developed by Astraware.

Bejeweled 2 Deluxe was released for the Xbox 360 as a downloadable Xbox Live Arcade game on November 22, 2005. It was also included on disc as a compilation of both Xbox Live Arcade Unplugged and PopCap Arcade Vol. 1. The Xbox 360 version is playable on Xbox One and Xbox Series X and S as part of the backward compatibility program. In 2007, the game was released on the PlayStation 2 alongside another PopCap game, AstroPop as a two-game compilation pack as PopCap Hits! Volume 1. Digital ports on the PlayStation Network for the PlayStation 3 and PlayStation Portable were released on January 29, 2009, and June 28, 2010, respectively. A port for the Wii's WiiWare platform, which lacked the secret game modes but incorporated the system's Miis into the game, was released on June 14, 2010.

PopCap released a version for iOS in 2008, which would later be renamed to Bejeweled 2 + Blitz following the addition of the Blitz game mode. In 2010, an Android version was released. Both versions would be discontinued following the release of Bejeweled Classic on each platform.
