= Zuma (video game) =

2003 video game

- Xbox Live Arcade cover
- Developer: PopCap Games
- Publishers: PopCap Games; Glu Mobile; Oberon Media
- Designer: Jason Kapalka
- Composer: Philippe Charron
- Series: Zuma
- Engine: PopCap Games Framework
- Platforms: Mac OS X, iPod, Mobile phone, Windows, Windows Mobile, Xbox, Xbox 360 (XBLA), PlayStation 2, Palm OS, Java, PlayStation 3, PlayStation Portable (PSN), In-flight entertainment (IFE)
- Release: December 12, 2003
- Genre: Puzzle
- Mode: Single-player

Zuma is a 2003 tile-matching puzzle video game developed and published by PopCap Games. It was released for a number of platforms, including PDAs, mobile phones, and the iPod.

An enhanced version, called Zuma Deluxe, was released for Microsoft Windows and Mac OS X as well as an Xbox Live Arcade download for the Xbox 360 and a PlayStation Network download for the PlayStation 3. It is also included with the PlayStation 3 retail version of Bejeweled 3, along with Feeding Frenzy 2.

Zuma received the 2004 "Game of the Year" award from RealArcade. It was followed by two sequels: Zuma's Revenge! (2009) and Zuma Blitz (2010).

== Gameplay ==
The objective of Zuma is to eliminate all of the balls rolling around the screen along a given path (the path is clearly visible in each level except for the last one) with other balls before these balls reach the yellow skull structure, which will open to varying degrees as a warning of oncoming balls. The player can carry two balls at a time and can switch at any moment. As soon as one ball reaches the skull, the others follow, the stone frog idol spins around quickly and disappears and the player loses a life. To prevent the balls from reaching the skull, the player can eliminate the balls by firing a colored ball from the stone frog idol's mouth towards the chain of balls. When three or more of the same color come in contact, they explode, possibly triggering other explosions as part of a chain reaction. The chain of balls will continue to push forward until the player fills the yellow bar, which is when the balls will stop producing off-screen. The level is completed when the player eliminates all of the balls on the screen after the bar is filled.

There are bonuses: for hitting coins; for combos, when firing a single ball cause two or more explosions, due to balls slide together and detonate; for causing explosions through gaps of line of other balls; and chains for having a streak of always causing an explosion with each consecutive ball (coins and chain bonuses are a quick way to fill the bar). Time bonuses are also awarded if the player completes the level within ace time – ranging from twenty five seconds to four minutes depending on the level.

Four different types of power-ups appear in the balls, which can be activated by exploding the ball with the power-up. The backwards ball pushes the furthest-out chain (depending on if all of the balls are connected) backwards for a short length of time. The slow-down ball slows the speed of the chain of balls for a short length of time. The accuracy ball allows quicker shots and points an arrow at where the ball will be shot (this stays active for about the same amount of time as the slow-down ball, but the size of the balls must be considered). The explosion ball explodes all of the balls within a small radius of the ball at the spot and time of its explosion. If not exploded quickly, power-up balls will return to their regular state after some time.

=== Adventure mode ===
Each regular adventure begins with three lives (represented by frogs in the upper-left hand corner of the screen), with extra lives awarded for every 50,000 points. Shooting a coin with a ball, making multiple groups of balls explode with a single shot, earning chain bonuses, firing through gaps in the balls, or finishing a level within a certain period of time (called ace time) all give extra points.

The levels are organized into temples, and the initial temple consists of three "stages" of five levels (the fifth level in each stage is unique in having two tracks of balls instead of the usual one). No level in the first stage contains tunnels, and the first level of each stage has no tunnels.

Stages 1 to 3 have four colors of balls: red, blue, green, and yellow, Stages 4 to 6 have five colors of balls, adding purple, and from Stage 7 on, white is added in the variety, making a total of six colors of balls. Levels are eventually added to stages: the second temple, which contains Stages 4 to 6, has six levels, while the third temple, which contains Stages 7 to 9, has seven levels. The fourth and final temple (which is hidden until a player unlocks Stage 10 for the first time) contains Stages 10 to 12, which also consists of seven levels each. Stages ten to twelve are the same as the preceding three stages, but the levels are considerably longer, with a total of 5,000 points required to completely fill the Zuma bar in each level. The balls also come out further at the start of the level, and the chain of balls moves along slightly faster.

If the player loses all of their lives, the game ends, and they must start again at the beginning of the last stage they reached, but if the player manages to complete all 12 stages, they are taken to the 13th and final stage, where it has only one level called "Space". This level is much longer than all previous levels (requiring 10,000 points to fill the Zuma bar), have no coins, and has no visible path for the balls to follow. This particular level cannot be accessed without first completing Stage 12, because there is no associated temple for Stage 13. Upon beating this level, the player wins the game. All extra lives remaining at the end of a game each are worth 50,000 additional points to add on to the final score.

=== Gauntlet mode ===
Zuma also offers the gauntlet mode, where the player can choose to play in a level they have already reached in adventure mode, and either practice to beat the level, or play in survival mode, where the difficulty in colors and speed of balls will gradually increase. The ranks of the gauntlet mode, in order, are Rabbit (4 ball colors), Eagle (5 ball colors), Jaguar (6 ball colors), and Sun God (6 ball colors). The player is required to win seven levels in practice mode or seven yellow bars in survival mode before advancing to the next rank for the first three ranks. At the Sun God rank, there are 19 stages for the single-track levels and 13 stages for the double-track ones; after reaching them, player can continue endlessly, since the level classification has no limit in both levels and bars (though all levels past those 19th/13th levels would be treated by the game merely as replaying of that 19th/13th level, except of increasing in-game displayed number).

== Plagiarism controversy ==
The Japanese developer Mitchell Corporation claims Zuma infringes on the intellectual property of their 1998 arcade game, Puzz Loop, which was released as Ballistic outside Japan. Mitchell re-released the design in 2006 as the Nintendo DS game Magnetica. PopCap asserted that Zuma was "not an exact clone", with PopCap founder Jason Kapalka saying he was "happy" with the idea of games being cloned by other developers, so long as the new version added to the gameplay of the game it had copied.

== Reception ==
Reception

Aggregate score
| Aggregator | Score |
|---|---|
| Metacritic | PS3: 78/100; X360: 77/100 |

Review scores
| Publication | Score |
|---|---|
| 4Players | 85/100 |
| Eurogamer | X360: 7/10; XBOX: 4/10 |
| GameSpot | J2ME: 8.2/10; PC: 8.1/10; X360: 7.2/10 |
| GamesRadar+ | 4/5 |
| IGN | 8/10; J2ME: 9.2/10 |
| Jeuxvideo.com | 15/20 |
| Pocket Gamer | 8/10 |
| TeamXbox | 8.5/10 |

The editors of Computer Gaming World nominated Zuma for their 2003 "Puzzle Game of the Year" award, which ultimately went to Bookworm.

The editors of Computer Gaming World nominated Zuma Deluxe as their 2004 "Arcade Classic of the Year", but it lost to Sid Meier's Pirates!.

During the 7th Annual Interactive Achievement Awards, the Academy of Interactive Arts & Sciences nominated Zuma Deluxe for "Computer Downloadable Game of the Year".

== Sequels ==
=== Zuma's Revenge (2009) ===
A sequel, Zuma's Revenge!, was launched on September 15, 2009, for Windows and Mac.

=== Zuma Blitz (2010) ===
Zuma Blitz went live on Facebook on December 14, 2010, and was described by PopCap as "the social adaptation" providing players with "the first competitive and cooperative iteration of Zuma in the game's history".

== See also ==
- Luxor
- Tumblebugs
