= Bejeweled Blitz =

2010 puzzle video game

- Developer: PopCap Games
- Publisher: Electronic Arts
- Designers: Jason Kapalka, Jon David, Andy Piro
- Series: Bejeweled
- Platforms: Windows, Mac OS X, iOS, Facebook Connect, Android
- Release: April 5, 2010
- Genre: Puzzle
- Mode: Single-player

Bejeweled Blitz is a puzzle video game, originally a Facebook application which was developed and published by PopCap Games; since 2011 Electronic Arts took over the publishing and distribution duty after EA acquired PopCap. It developed into a downloadable game, based on the then-in-development Bejeweled 3 engine, due to popularity of the differences from Bejeweled 2 and its new graphics. As with the Bejeweled series, Bejeweled Blitz is based on the match-three game mechanic. It is the fourth game of the Bejeweled franchise and initially was available on iOS as part of the Bejeweled 2 iOS application, later on with the standalone iOS application. The game was then released on Android devices.

== Gameplay ==
A game in progress, showing no points on the board. The layout shown was used until the game's redesign.

The goal of Bejeweled Blitz is to match gems and Multipliers in order to get the highest score possible in one minute. By connecting with Facebook, players can compete with others for a high score on leaderboards. Players can equip boosts (which required coins to use until the redesign; boosts are now free to use) to gain power-ups for use in-game, and Rare Gems, special power-ups that can change gameplay (for example, explosive gems, gems that destroy other gems diagonally, etc.).

Trailer for the Android version

The main game screen is an 8 x 8 grid of gems. Players make lines of three by swapping gems with adjacent gems. When a match is made, the matched gems disappear and more gems fall into the board from above. Special gems can be created by making matches of four or more. Players would earn a base value of 250 points for each match and if players matched the gems quickly enough three times, they'll earn a Speed Bonus, which adds the bonus to the base starting with 200, and continuing on until 1,000 for nine speed matches, which unlocks the Ignition Meter. If they are fast enough and when the meter is full, then a special ability would occur known as Blazing Speed. During Blazing Speed, the playing field would burn and every match made would explode and destroy surrounding gems (similar to a Flame Gem). If a Multiplier is matched with two other gems, then the point value would increase as the game progresses, starting from 2x. After one minute, players would receive an end-of-game bonus known as the Last Hurrah. When that happens, any Special gems and Multipliers would be removed from the board. The Last Hurrah bonus would then be added to the player's subtotal, which gives them the grand total for the game. Depending on the player's progress, they'll receive a Star Medal. They would receive 25,000 points for the first, 50,000 for the second, and so on until 10,000,000 or more. There are also Coin Gems. Each time a Coin Gem is matched, 100 coins would be added to the player's bank. Also, the player would receive five times its base value.

Unlike the previous games in the series, Bejeweled Blitz allows the player to swap gems while gems from previous matches are still falling.

Features outside of normal gameplay in the mobile and Facebook versions include a Daily Spin, which lets the player earn in-game items or currency, missions and a Daily Challenge, that has new challenges daily.

== Bejeweled Blitz LIVE ==
Bejeweled Blitz LIVE
- Developer: Torpex Games
- Publisher: PopCap Games
- Series: Bejeweled
- Platform: Xbox 360
- Release: March 1, 2011
- Modes: Single-player, multiplayer

Bejeweled Blitz LIVE is a console port of Bejeweled Blitz. The game was developed by Torpex Games and was released as a downloadable Xbox 360 title on March 3, 2011. It is also included in the Xbox 360 retail version of Bejeweled 3.

Bejeweled Blitz LIVE includes exclusive features, including an offline VS. mode that can be played up to two players, an online VS. mode and a party mode that can be played up to 16 players. One of the unique features in the game is the ability to play a Twist mode, which plays similarly to Bejeweled Twist. Unlike the original game, the gems can be spun counter-clockwise.

== Reception ==
Reception

Aggregate score
| Aggregator | Score |
|---|---|
| Metacritic | X360: 68/100 |

Review scores
| Publication | Score |
|---|---|
| Eurogamer | 7/10 |
| Gamekult | 4/10 |
| GamePro | 4/5 |
| GameRevolution | C |
| IGN | 7/10 |
| Official Xbox Magazine (UK) | 8/10 |
| TouchArcade | 5/5 |

During the 13th Annual Interactive Achievement Awards, the Academy of Interactive Arts & Sciences nominated Bejeweled Blitz for "Social Networking Game of the Year".
