= Unpleasant Horse =

2011 video game

- Developers: 4th and Battery
- Publisher: PopCap Games
- Platform: iOS
- Release: April 28, 2011
- Genre: Platform

Unpleasant Horse is a side-scrolling platform game developed by 4th and Battery for iOS, a subsidiary of PopCap Games.

== Gameplay ==
The protagonist of the game is a black "horse" (though technically a pegasus), which the user must direct across the level by having the horse bounce on clouds, and on the backs of white horses. This causes the white horses to fall onto meat grinders at the bottom of the level; if the user misdirects the black horse when trying to hit a cloud or a white horse, then the black horse itself falls onto the meat grinders.

== Release ==
The game was believed to be rejected from the App Store for "mature content" in April 2011 due to a miscommunication, but it was still undergoing review. Unpleasant Horse is no longer available on the iOS App Store.

== Reception ==
Reception

Aggregate score
Aggregator	Score
Metacritic	72/100

Review scores
Publication	Score
Eurogamer	6/10
GamePro	4/5
Gamezebo	80/100
MacLife	3/5
Macworld	4.5/5
Pocket Gamer	3/5
TouchArcade	3.5/5

The game received "mixed or average reviews" according to the review aggregation website Metacritic.
