= Feeding Frenzy (video game) =

2004 video game

- Cover from the Xbox 360 version
- Developer: Sprout Games
- Publishers: GameHouse; PopCap Games; Real Arcade (J2ME)
- Designers: James Gwertzman; Del Chafe; Ed Allard
- Series: Feeding Frenzy
- Platforms: Windows, Macintosh, Xbox, Xbox 360, Arcade, J2ME
- Release: March 17, 2004
- Mode: Single-player

Feeding Frenzy is a single-player mode and arcade-style aquatic video game written by Sprout Games, and published by PopCap Games and GameHouse. With an initial debut on February 11, 2004, it saw a re-release on the Xbox Live Arcade service, with versions for both the original Xbox and the Xbox 360. The Xbox 360 version, released on March 15, 2006, was the 17th most popular Xbox Live Arcade title for 2006.

In March 2006, the sequel to this game, Feeding Frenzy 2 was released.

In 2016, Feeding Frenzy was made available for Xbox One backwards compatibility and is free to members on EA Access.

== Gameplay ==
In Feeding Frenzy, players control a hungry marine predator intent on munching as many other fish as possible. During the course of the game's 40 levels, they switch off between 5 marine animals, with the last eight levels having them play as Orville the Orca, and the last level being a 'boss battle' against the "Shark King", a great white shark. The player takes on the role of different aquatic species each trying to move up the food chain. As smaller fish are eaten, the player's own fish grows in size and becomes capable of eating somewhat larger fish. By the end of each level, the fish is sufficiently large enough that it can eat almost anything on-screen. Players must be vigilant for hazards which include depth charges, larger predators, naval mines, irradiated fish, and jellyfish.

If the player eats a sufficiently large number of fish in a short period of time, a score-enhancing Feeding Frenzy is initiated. If the player continues to rapidly consume other fish, a further Double Frenzy can be achieved. The Frenzy bonus depletes rapidly when there is no further rapid consumption.

The full game includes both a normal mode and a "time attack" mode.

== Release ==
The free ActiveX version of Feeding Frenzy can be played online at websites such as the MSN Gaming Zone, but has only a limited number of levels. The Windows version, Feeding Frenzy Deluxe, is available for download as a trial, with the full version available for a fee. Additionally, Xbox and Xbox 360 versions exist. The original Xbox version was available via an Xbox Live Arcade disc from Microsoft, or from Official Xbox Magazine discs. The Xbox 360 version could be downloaded from the Xbox Live Marketplace, either as a free demo, or as a full version. This version was also included on the disc that came with the Xbox Arcade bundle for the Xbox 360, alongside Pac-Man Championship Edition, Uno, Luxor 2, and Boom Boom Rocket. The Xbox 360 Pro and Elite versions included this version as one of the 16 game demos preloaded on the hard drive.

An arcade version was released by UltraCade Technologies which featured a ticket redemption system and an automated difficulty tuning system. The arcade cabinet also features built-in bubbler tanks on both sides with flowing water and artificial fish.

A J2ME ported version of the game was released for some mobile phones by Real Arcade in 2006, with fewer levels due to the limitations of the mobile phone's storage medium.

== Reception ==
Reception

Review scores
Publication	Score
TeamXbox	7/10 (Xbox 360)
IGN	6.6/10 (Xbox 360)
Eurogamer	3/10 (Xbox 360)

IGN criticized Feeding Frenzy's simple mechanics, lack of difficulty, and overall lack of depth, resulting in a score of 6.6 out of 10 for the Xbox 360 version. The review suggested that additional online elements could have helped with the title's otherwise limited lasting appeal. TeamXbox also criticized the game's difficulty and replayability, suggesting that it may be better suited towards children. Despite considering Feeding Frenzy 'somewhat shallow', TeamXbox concluded that the game was still accessible and fun, awarding the Xbox 360 version a 7 out of 10. Eurogamer gave the Xbox 360 version of Feeding Frenzy an overall score of three out of ten, expressing that while initially "charming in its simplicity", the game quickly becomes 'boring' and 'repetitive', further stating that every level is "just more of the same".
