= Feeding Frenzy 2 =

2006 video game

Feeding Frenzy 2: Shipwreck Showdown
- Developer: Sprout Games
- Publisher: PopCap Games
- Designers: Ed Allard and Ben Lyon
- Series: Feeding Frenzy
- Platforms: Windows, Xbox 360 (XBLA), PlayStation 3 (PSN)
- Release: PC (March 15, 2006); XBLA (September 17, 2008); PSN (March 11, 2010)
- Genre: Arcade
- Modes: Single-player, multiplayer (XBLA, PSN)

Feeding Frenzy 2: Shipwreck Showdown is an arcade-style video game by American developer Sprout Games involving the marine food chain. It is the sequel to the 2004 game Feeding Frenzy. The game was developed and published by PopCap Games on March 15, 2006. It is also included in the PlayStation 3 retail version of Bejeweled 3, along with Zuma.

== Gameplay ==
As in Feeding Frenzy, players have to control several fast-growing marine predators who are out to uncover a mystery lurking in the ocean. The game aims to avoid predators and obstacles while eating other smaller fish and creatures, eventually reaching the top of the food chain. Feeding Frenzy 2 includes 60 new levels which feature scenery such as new underwater worlds, coral reefs, deep sea caves, and sunken ships, including above-water challenges. The story mode has the player control a small butterflyfish named Boris. The player has Boris eat toward the top of the food chain. Along the way, the player encounters new prey and predators, both friendly and unfriendly, and must stop an alien fish named "The Intruder" from destroying the ocean.

== Reception ==
Reception

Aggregate score
Aggregator	Score
Metacritic	65/100

Review scores
Publication	Score
Eurogamer	6/10
Gamekult	3/10
GamePro	14.75/20
GameSpot	6.5/10
Gamezebo	4/5
IGN	PS3: 6/10; X360: 7/10
Jeuxvideo.com	14/20
Official Xbox Magazine (US)	8/10
TeamXbox	7/10

Feeding Frenzy 2: Shipwreck Showdown received "mixed or average" reviews according to review aggregator Metacritic.
