= Bejeweled Stars =

- Developer: PopCap Games
- Publisher: Electronic Arts
- Series: Bejeweled
- Engine: Unity
- Platforms: iOS, Android, Facebook, Pogo
- Release: Canada: December 2015; WW: May 10, 2016
- Genre: Puzzle
- Mode: Single-player

Bejeweled Stars (formerly known as Bejeweled Skies during its soft-launch) is a tile match-3 game developed by PopCap Games and published by Electronic Arts. It is the third spin-off title in the Bejeweled series and the first to debut on smart devices. The game was soft-launched in Canada in December 2015, and was released worldwide on May 10, 2016.

Unlike previous games in the series, Bejeweled Stars is centered around the completion of levels, similar to Candy Crush Saga. Once the player has completed one level, the next one is unlocked. Each level has its own objective, and some levels introduce the player to various game mechanics such as currents, clouds, Special Gems and further unique goals.

== Plot ==
Corvus the StormCrow creates a powerful object in the PowerLab that accidentally shatters the constellations in the sky, scattering the stars across the land. Felis the StarCat and Corvus the StormCrow ask the player for help to rebuild the constellations.

== Gameplay ==
Like the other games in the series, Bejeweled Stars involves the player swapping two adjacent gems to create a line of three or more gems. When this occurs, the matched gems disappear from the board, with other gems falling down, potentially creating cascades. Matching four or more gems can create Special Gems, which can destroy multiple gems at once. Matching four gems in a row or creating a 2x2 space of same-colored gems will create a Flame Gem, which explodes and destroys the eight gems that surround it. Making a T, L or +-shaped match creates a Star Gem, which destroys all the gems on its row and column. Creating a match of five gems in a row creates a Hyper Cube, which destroys all the gems of its color when swapped with a gem. If a match of six gems or more is made, it will form into a DarkSphere, which turns all the gems of the swapped gem's color into Hypercubes. Stars adds the ability to merge the abilities of the Special Gems by swapping two adjacent Special Gems (ex: swapping two Flame Gems creates a larger explosion, while swapping a Hyper Cube with a Star Gem turns all the gems of its color into Star Gems, etc.).

Unlike previous entries in the series, Bejeweled Stars involves the use of completing levels with different goals, with a limited number of moves the player is allowed to perform. The goals and moves the player can perform differ between each level (ex: the player must clear all gravel from the board in 25 moves, clear 40 red gems in 30 moves, etc.). The board shape, size and layout differ between stages, but are always below 10x10. Gems cannot be moved into empty spaces, unlike previous entries. For the first time in the series, gaps can be present inside the game board. Gems can also fall diagonally into empty spaces that have gaps above them. Several boards have gimmicks that help or hinder the player's progress (ex: Currents shift the positions of the gems on top of it to the direction signalized every time a move is made, Clouds allow the player to move the gems on top of it to an empty cloud slot of which they desire without using a move, and more). Completing a level gives the player up to three stars, with the amount of stars received determined by the total score achieved on that level. Earning stars forms part of several constellations, which unlock powers in the PowerLab when fully completed, alongside coins and eggs being awarded by completing several pieces of a constellation.

When no moves are possible, all the gems on the board (except Special Gems) scramble. The amount of gem colors start at a small amount, but begin to increase further in the level, until all 7 colors are present, making it harder to make matches. A level is lost when the move count reaches zero or a butterfly escapes the game board. Losing or quitting a level will deduct one life from the life bar (which is represented by a heart). When no more lives are present, the player cannot play the game until they have at least one life. Lives regenerate by one every 20 minutes, and will generate a maximum of five lives (but can be expanded to six through an in-app purchase), can be regenerated by spending coins or can be received from other Facebook friends. Players may win unlimited life awards on certain occasions that turns the lives bar to gold, granting infinite play for a short period of time.

Occasionally during gameplay, special normal gems known as SkyGems appear on the board, which can be collected as ingredients to use in the PowerLab. The PowerLab is a feature that allows the player to create power-ups using their collected SkyGems. Once a power begins creating, the player must wait until it completes, or can watch an advertisement or spend coins to hurry the creation.

Additional features include collectibles known as Emojis (known as Charms in earlier versions), which are used for the player's bio and to answer Yama's questions, a loot-box system known as the Surprise Chicken, and a daily-altering challenge. Events that happen in-game can usually alter some gems to certain objects which fill an event meter, which can grant special awards.

== Release ==
Bejeweled Stars was originally soft-launched in Canada under the title Bejeweled Skies in December 2015. The game would go under many changes following the release of the game through updates. An HTML5 version for Facebook was launched on September 26, 2016. A scaled-down version of the game was released on the Pogo platform on July 25, 2020.

== Reception ==
Bejeweled Stars received "mixed or average" reviews from critics, according to the review aggregation website Metacritic.
