= Bejeweled Twist =

2008 puzzle video game

- Developers: PopCap Games; Griptonite Games (co-developer for DS)
- Publishers: PopCap Games; Square Enix (DSiWare, Japan); Media Sales & Licensing (Nintendo DS)
- Designers: Jason Kapalka; Brian Fiete
- Composers: Peter Hajba, Philippe Charron
- Series: Bejeweled
- Engine: PopCap Framework
- Platforms: Windows, Java ME, Mobile, Zeebo, Flash, Nintendo DS, Nintendo DSi (DSiWare), Symbian^3
- Release: October 27, 2008 (Windows); November 30, 2009 (browser); May 7, 2009 (mobile); December 14, 2009 (DSiWare); January 19, 2010 (Nintendo DS)
- Genre: Puzzle
- Modes: Single-player, multiplayer

Bejeweled Twist is a tile-matching puzzle video game developed by and published by PopCap Games. It is the third game overall and first spin-off game in the Bejeweled series, as well as being the first PopCap title to be released in high definition and feature widescreen support.

Bejeweled Twist differs greatly compared to previous entries in the series. Instead of swapping two adjacent gems, the player now rotates four clockwise. The game features four modes and introduces several new elements to the series, including the Lightning Gem, the Supernova Gem, and Bad Gems, as well as Instant Replay features and improved ranking systems.

The game was originally released on October 27, 2008, for Microsoft Windows and has received mixed to positive reviews.

Gameplay of the game's Challenge Mode

== Gameplay ==
Bejeweled Twist plays similarly to its predecessors. Instead of swapping two adjacent gems, the player rotates four gems in a 2x2 space clockwise. Like its predecessors, the game involves attempting to create matches of three or more gems in a row to clear them from the board. When this occurs, the gems above it are affected by gravity, falling down and potentially creating cascades.

Unlike previous entries in the series, it is no longer required for a move to create a match of gems. Making consecutive valid matches adds ticks to the multiplier bar at the top left of the screen. When the multiplier bar is filled, the score multiplier increases, with the multiplier going as high as 10. When the multiplier is filled at the tenth multiplier, it will begin filling in a new rainbow layer onto the bar. When it is filled, a Bad Gem (or if there is not any, a random gem) will turn into a Fruit Gem, which destroys all gems of its color off the board when matched, similar to the Hypercube in previous entries, as well as adding extra ticks to Bomb and Doom Gems, and destroying all locks from the board.

Like its predecessors, Special Gems return. Making matches of four gems in a row, L, +, or T shape creates a Flame Gem, which destroys the eight gems surrounding it when matched. New to the game is the Lightning Gem, created by making a match of five gems in a row. The Lightning Gem destroys all gems on its row and column when activated. Additionally, matching six or more gems in a row creates a Supernova Gem, which destroys all the gems in its row and column on a 3x3 radius.

New to this game are Coals, which cannot be matched, but release a large point bonus when destroyed. Twist introduces Bad Gems, which usually hinder the player's progress. Bomb Gems must be destroyed before their counters hit 0, which causes them to explode and end the game. Locked Gems prevent the player from rotating an area of gems with a lock. Doom Gems cannot be matched or moved, and their counter only goes down when matchless moves are made.

Other new gimmicks include the Speed Bonus, which gives the player a score bonus if consecutive matches are made quickly enough, the Bonus Challenge, which provides the player with extra ticks and the destruction of a Bad Gem when the gems shown on the panel are matched in order, and the Mega Fruit Bonus, which is activated after the detonation of a Fruit Gem and awards a large number of points when performed successfully.

Bejeweled Twist features a ranking system, which increases depending on how well the player plays. Completing levels in Classic and Zen, completing challenges in Challenge, and completing games of Blitz awards the player with stars, which vary in amount based on how much the player has scored in the game mode/level.

There are several different modes of gameplay available.

- Classic involves attempting to score as many points as possible before a Bomb or Doom Gem's counter reaches zero. Matching gems fill up the Level Up Tube on the left of the screen. When it is filled, the player proceeds to the next level, where the base score is multiplied by the current level counter but requires more points to proceed to the next level. If a Bomb Gem reaches zero, the player is given a chance to disarm it by using the Disarm Spinner. If the spinner lands on the gems, the game continues. If it lands on the skulls, the Bomb Gem explodes and destroys the game board, ending the game. If a Doom Gem reaches zero, it will instantly explode, ending the game. Later levels will have Bomb and Doom Gems starting at lower number counts, along with said gems and locks appearing more frequently.
- Zen is an endless variant of Classic, where Bomb, Doom Gems, and Locks do not appear. Therefore, the player can never lose. The player earns stars at half the rate of Classic, and the base score multiplier does not increase throughout levels.
- Challenge is a mini-game-based mode that is unlocked when the player reaches the third rank of the game. Challenge is made up of several different challenges. On each planet, the player is given a specific challenge to complete. In the PC version, all the planets at the start (except Detonator) are locked. When at least the first challenge on a planet is completed, the next planet is unlocked. Every time a challenge is completed, the player is given stars. Each planet has seven challenges that increase in difficulty. After completing the seventh challenge, the planet's challenge turns into an Eclipse Mode. The player is given the task to make the highest objective possible in 3 minutes (except for Stratamax and Survivor). There are 13 planets to clear.
- Blitz is a timed version of Classic, where the player has five minutes to score as many points as possible. It is unlocked when Level 10 in Classic is completed for the first time, while it is unlocked at the beginning in the Steam version. In the web version, the time limit is three minutes. The game ends when a Bomb Gem counts down to zero or when time runs out.
- Battle is a multiplayer game mode exclusive to the Nintendo DS and DSiWare versions of the game. Battle involves attacking the opponent by sending Bomb Gems to the opponent's game board, and pushing the progress tube to the edge to win, in tug-of-war fashion. The game ends when a Bomb Gem explodes (in which the exploding side loses) or when the tube is filled (in which the player who filled it wins). The game mode requires two copies of either version with two Nintendo DS/DSi systems to play.

== Development ==
=== Background and conception ===
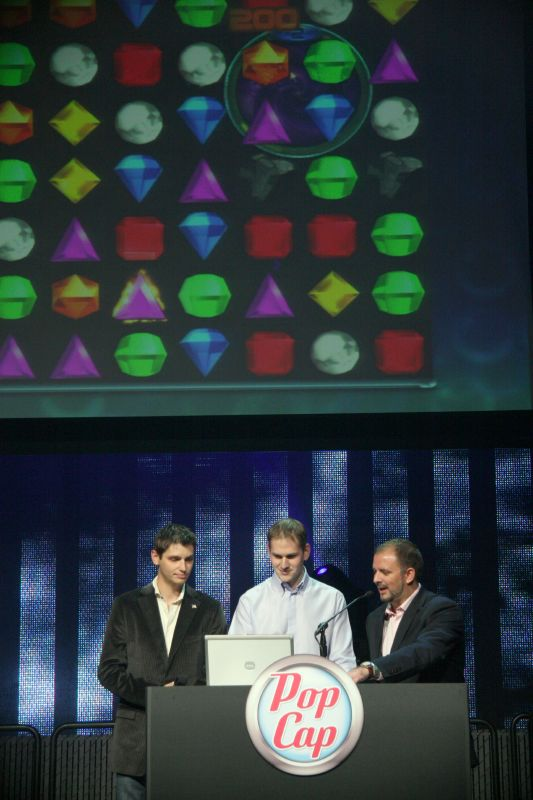
Vechey (left), Fiete (center), and Kapalka (right) at the podium during the Bejeweled Twist launch event in 2008

As of 2008, PopCap Games' Bejeweled, which began in 2000, was one of the most popular casual game franchises, garnering 350 million downloads, 25 million sales, and releases on various personal computers, consoles, and mobile devices such as the iPod and iPad. In addition to establishing PopCap as a notable developer and significantly increasing the casual game market, Bejeweled, made up 30-to-40-percent of the company's revenue at the time of Bejeweled Twist's release, claimed company workers. While match-three gameplay was implemented in titles like Columns (1990), Bejeweled was the first to popularize it with casual gamers, influencing the creation of several more products of its kind. According to game journalists, its wide appeal resulted from its addictiveness; it had a simple, pick-up-and-play gameplay formula that still challenged players with the right mixture of luck and skill.

Bejeweled Twist began as a game independent of the Bejeweled series, Zongo. PopCap initially intended the project as experimentation with a two-by-two rotation mechanic, and Bejeweled's graphics were only used as placeholders. Planned rotatable items included fruit and sushi. However, after a year of development, the staff thought that gems would be a better fit. Thus, the project switched to a Bejeweled spin-off named Bejeweled Twist. PopCap CEO Dave Roberts explained that the project was a huge risk for its rotation aspect and it took a long time to design and program the game to be enjoyable: "We have been very cautious about how we deal with the franchise. If our only focus was uncaringly trying to print money, we would have made a new ‘Bejeweled’ game every six months. But the studio here, they don't want to do that." A similar sentiment was shared by journalists of the gaming press. These included Brandon Sheffield of Game Developer; though reporting there was still a boom in the casual games market, he also highlighted the lack of AAA titles in it.

PopCap initially planned for the ability for the gems to be rotated in any way. However, as founder Jason Kapalka theorized, it would mean too many possible moves for the average player to consider, resulting in slower gameplay. Additionally, he explained that the concept was not well-received by testers and that one of the direction buttons would have to be right-clicked, which would not be instinctual for gamers. For casual gamers to adapt to the new rotating mechanic, visual cues such as a vortex indicating the rotation direction were incorporated, and easy levels and tutorial were added early in the game: "If you start a game like that where you're still learning, and it's kicking your ass while you're learning it -- that's kind of harsh."

=== Production ===
According to staff, Bejeweled Twist took an estimated three-to-four year development, with a budget of $1–1.5 million and two-to-seven workers, larger than the usual PopCap project, as well as most casual games. The project started with one coder, Kurt Pfeifer. However, after realizing the technical aspects and programming would be larger than PopCap's past projects, the company expanded the team to four programmers and three artists working on various aspects, which PopCap founder John Vechey considered "insane" due to the game's straightforward style. To make the process streamlined, the staff changed to three individuals directed to specific tasks: Chris Hargrove on the new graphics engine, Josh Langley for 3D animations, and Chief Technology Officer Brian Fiete on other new elements. Bejeweled Twist's development influenced PopCap to have multiple people involved in future projects; Kapalka felt technical issues early in development could have been solved sooner if multiple developers were there to fix them.

Kapalka described Bejeweled Twist's code as a Bejeweled 2 variant with alterations "hacked in and then out again". This coding led to so many bugs and glitches in the final project that PopCap's third-party compatibility tester refused to work on it, meaning PopCap compatibility-tested in-house. Kapalka, on recollection, argued the design should have been finalized first then a new codebase written. With Bejeweled Twist, a new set of tools and engines were introduced in PopCap's pipeline; this included support for 1080p quality and True 3D that could still be seen at lower resolutions, and new resource management and source control systems. For graphics to be imported faster, the ResourceGen tool was created; it allowed multi-layered Photoshop .PSD files to be imported directly into the code instead of having to break down layers of a file.

The soundtrack to the game is composed by Finnish musician Peter Hajba, known by his demoscene nickname Skaven, and Phillipe Charon. The voice in the main menu and during gameplay is performed by Ken Tamplin.

== Release ==
Bejeweled Twist was initially released on PC on October 27, 2008. It was originally released on PopCap.com, but became available on other sites. The game is currently available on Origin for PC and Steam, as of now. Following its initial release, the game was ported to several other platforms.

Bejeweled Twist was ported to the Adobe Flash Player platform on November 30, 2009. The Flash version of the game only features Classic and a 3-minute version of Blitz. The online version of the game also lacks the Bonus Challenge feature.

On May 7, 2009, Bejeweled Twist was ported over to cellphones through the Java ME platform.

A downloadable version of Bejeweled Twist was released on the Nintendo DSi through the Nintendo DSi Shop's DSiWare platform on December 14, 2009. The DSi version contained the PC version's Classic Mode and an exclusive multiplayer Battle mode, where players who had two DS systems with two copies of the game could battle against each other. A physical version of the game, containing the game's other modes and features, was released on January 19, 2010. The DSiWare version of the game would release on the Nintendo 3DS' Nintendo eShop on July 7, 2011. The DSiWare version of the game was discontinued in March 2023, alongside the closure of the Nintendo eShop for the Nintendo 3DS and Wii U.

== Reception ==
Reception

Aggregate score
Aggregator	Score
Metacritic	DS: 77/100; PC: 78/100

Review scores
Publication	Score
Eurogamer	7/10
GamePro	17.5/20
GameRevolution	B
GameSpot	7/10
IGN	DSi & PC: 7.4/10; DS: 7/10
Nintendo Life	7/10
PALGN	6/10
Pocket Gamer	8/10
The A.V. Club	B

Bejeweled Twist received "generally favorable" reviews on both platforms, according to review aggregation website Metacritic.

Bejeweled Twist was claimed by PALGN's Kimberley Ellis and IGN's Levi Buchanan to be one of the most polished casual games at the time. Critics described the music and sound effects as exceptional, "catchy" and "hypnotic". Buchanan called it one of the few casual games soundtracks worthy of being played loudly, highlighting the Blitz Mode theme. The visuals were also praised for the colorfulness, the look of the gems, and between-stage animations.

== Works cited ==
- Wyman, Michael Thornton (September 30, 2010). "Bejeweled Twist". Making Great Games. CRC Press. pp. 115–128. ISBN 9781136132377.
