= PopCap Games =

American video game developer

PopCap Games, Inc.
- Formerly: Sexy Action Cool (2000)
- Type: Subsidiary
- Industry: Video games
- Founded: 2000; 26 years ago
- Founders: John Vechey; Brian Fiete; Jason Kapalka
- Headquarters: Seattle, United States
- Key people: Matt Nutt (general manager)
- Products: List of games
- Number of employees: ~400 (2010)
- Parent: Electronic Arts (2011–present)
- Divisions: PopCap Seattle; PopCap Vancouver; PopCap Shanghai; PopCap Hyderabad
- Website: ea.com/ea-studios/popcap

PopCap Games, Inc. is an American video game developer based in Seattle and a subsidiary of Electronic Arts. The company was founded in 2000 by John Vechey, Brian Fiete, and Jason Kapalka.

Originally founded under the name Sexy Action Cool, its first title was a strip poker game which served as a revenue stream for future titles. PopCap has developed several games for computers, consoles, and mobile devices with their most popular games being Bejeweled, Peggle, Zuma, and Plants vs. Zombies. PopCap was acquired and became a subsidiary of Electronic Arts on July 12, 2011.

== History ==
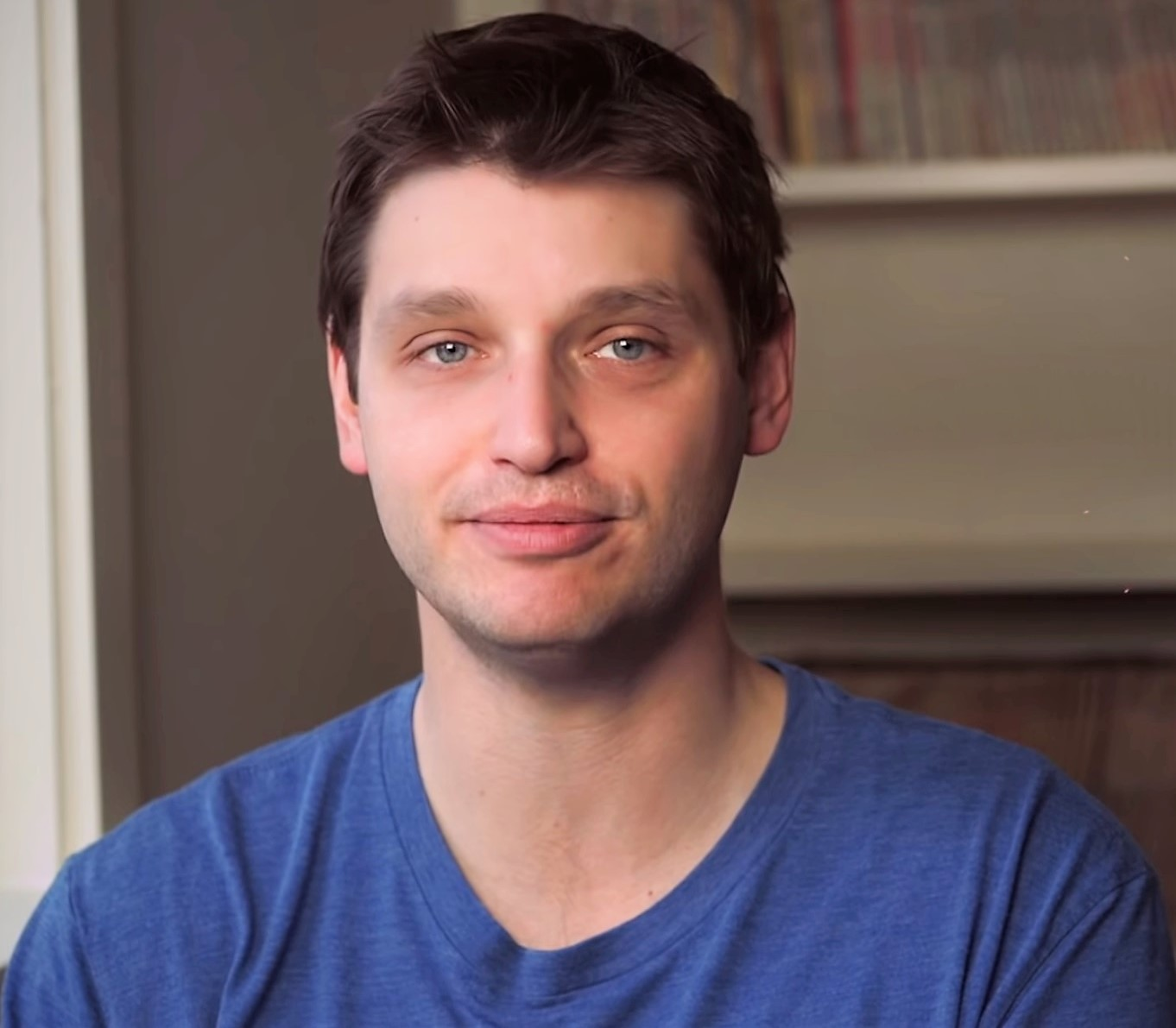
John Vechey in a PlayLab appearance, October 2015

PopCap Games was founded by John Vechey, Brian Fiete, and Jason Kapalka in 2000. They originally incorporated as "Sexy Action Cool", a phrase taken from a poster of Desperado. Their first title was a strip poker game called "Foxy Poker" and was supposed to be a revenue stream for its future titles.

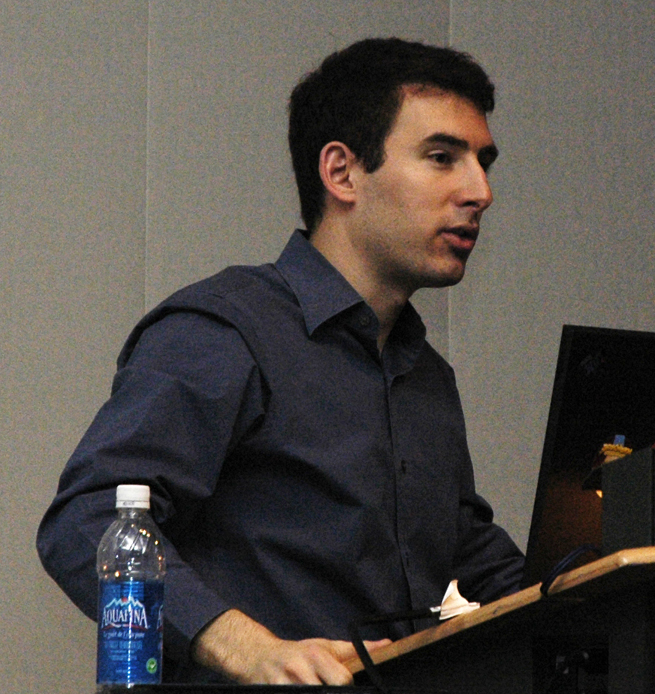
James Gwertzman representing PopCap Games at the 2007 Montreal International Games Summit

Their first game as PopCap was Bejeweled, a gem-swapping game, which was supported on all major platforms and given an award by Computer Gaming World Hall Of Fame in 2002.

The company expanded in 2005 with the acquisition of Sprout Games, a casual games developer company in Seattle like PopCap Games, started by James Gwertzman. Sprout Games created the game Feeding Frenzy. The Sprout team helped PopCap make a sequel to the game, Feeding Frenzy 2: Shipwreck Showdown, with Gwertzman becoming the director of business development at PopCap.

In early 2006, PopCap International was opened, based in Dublin working on product localization, mobile games development, marketing, sales, and business development.

PopCap began another round of expansion in July 2007 by buying other casual game developers such as the Vancouver based studio SpinTop Games, creators of games like Mistery Solitaire and Mistery P.I. And the Chicago-based development house Retro64, founded by Mike Boeh, which is best known for their retro-arcade action and puzzle titles.

After the acquisitions, the PopCap logo was rebranded, dropping the "Games" portion. PopCap's premium games list on their website are mixed with other games from other developers/distributors. PopCap hosted several games on PopCap.com and other websites, online and premium, until 2014, when they stopped offering games from their site.

On February 2009, PopCap acquired Gastronaut Studios, an independent developer, creators of the game Small Arms, and who worked with Popcap by porting Peggle and Feeding Frenzy 2 to XBLA.

On April 5, 2011, PopCap announced the creation of a new subsidiary, 4th and Battery, started in order to create "edgier" games. Their first creation was the game Unpleasant Horse.

On May 3, 2011, PopCap announced the acquisition of San Francisco-based studio ZipZapPlay, this in an effort to expand their resources in social-based games on Facebook.

On July 12, 2011, Electronic Arts announced that it was acquiring PopCap for $650 million with an additional $100 million stock option. On August 21, 2012, PopCap laid off 50 employees in North America in a move to address a shift to mobile and free-to-play games and evaluated ceasing operations of its Dublin studio. The Dublin studio was closed on September 24, 2012.

In 2014, Vechey was the last of the founders to announce his departure from the company. This followed Kapalka's resignation earlier the same year. Fiete left in 2010, prior to PopCap's acquisition by EA.

== Games developed ==
PopCap has developed over 60 games over the past 25 years. Games developed by PopCap include Bejeweled, Plants vs. Zombies, Peggle, and Bookworm.

=== Bejeweled ===
Bejeweled is a series of tile-matching puzzle video games created by PopCap Games. Bejeweled was released initially for browsers in 2000, followed by five sequels: Bejeweled 2 (2004), Bejeweled Twist (2008), Bejeweled Blitz (2009), Bejeweled 3 (2010), Bejeweled Stars (2016) and more, all by PopCap Games and its parent company, Electronic Arts.

=== Plants vs. Zombies ===
Plants vs. Zombies is a tower defense and strategy video game developed and originally published by PopCap Games for Windows and OS X in May 2009, and ported to consoles, handhelds, mobile devices, and remastered versions for personal computers.

=== Peggle ===
Peggle is a series of casual puzzle video games created by PopCap Games. Peggle was released initially for desktop in 2007, followed by five sequels: Peggle Extreme (2007), Peggle Nights (2008), Peggle Dual Shot (2009), Peggle 2 (2013) and Peggle Blast (2014).

=== Zuma ===
Zuma is a tile-matching puzzle video game developed and published by PopCap Games. Zuma was released initially for multiple platforms, followed by one enhanced version, Zuma Deluxe, and two sequels: Zuma's Revenge! (2009), and Zuma Blitz (2010).
