= Bookworm (video game) =

2003 video game

- Cover art for the CD-ROM release of Bookworm
- Developers: PopCap Games; Black Lantern Studios (Nintendo DS and DSiWare)
- Publisher: PopCap Games
- Designer: Jason Kapalka
- Series: Bookworm
- Engine: PopCap Games Framework
- Platforms: Windows, Macintosh, iOS, Game Boy Advance, Xbox Live Arcade, PDA, Smartphone, Java ME, BREW, DSiWare, Nintendo DS, TAG TV
- Release: February 25, 2003; November 30, 2009 (Nintendo DS and DSiWare)
- Genre: Puzzle
- Modes: Single-player, Multiplayer (DS and TAG version only)

Bookworm is a word-forming puzzle video game by PopCap Games. From a grid of available letters, players connect letters to form words. As words are formed, they are removed from the grid and the remaining letters collapse to fill the available space. Players earn more points by creating longer words or words which use less common letters and earn less for smaller words. In November 2006, PopCap Games released a sequel, Bookworm Adventures. Bookworm was released for the Nintendo DS digital distribution service DSiWare on November 30, 2009. It has also been released on the regular Nintendo DS cartridge. Bookworm is the most downloaded word puzzle game, being downloaded over 100 million times. The deluxe version of the game features updated graphics, Action Game, and the Hall of Fame.

== Gameplay ==
The board with a rewarded Gold tile "T"

The game requires players to match adjacent letters to form a word in the English language. Longer words are worth more points and have a greater chance of producing bonuses.

In addition to standard letters, tiles of various colors can appear depending both on the current level within the game and on the length of words being formed. Other than standard tiles there are four colors of tiles:

- Red Burning Tiles – Throughout the game, burning red letters appear, increasing in frequency at higher difficulty levels. These letters automatically move downwards, burning through letters below them in the column, until they reach the bottom of the grid, ending the game. In the Classic mode, they burn down one level after each turn, and if a burning tile reaches the bottom, the player has to clear it on that turn, otherwise the game ends. In the Action mode, they automatically appear and burn down a level every few seconds, and if a burning tile gets to the bottom, the player must clear the burning tile within ten seconds, otherwise, the game ends.
- Green Tiles, Gold Tiles, Sapphire Tiles, and Diamond Tiles – These tiles are awarded to indicate skill in forming longer words. Using these tiles in words increase the number of points earned by the word. It takes progressively longer for burning tiles to burn through the higher-value tiles (a green tile takes two turns to burn through, and a gold tile takes three). Green tiles enter the board from the top, as new regular tiles do, while higher-value bonus titles replace random letters already on the board.

The game has two modes. "Classic" mode is untimed, while "Action" mode uses randomly appearing burning tiles to create a time-limited game. If the player clicks on Lex, the game mascot found off to the side of the play area, all of the tiles will be scrambled; however, this will produce a rush of red tiles.

Additional points are given for bonus words displayed in the game; additional bonus words formed during a single game produce increasing bonus values. In some versions a player can also collect and complete "books" which are groups of words in a similar category. Once a player completes the first of any of these words in a particular category it unlocks the book, and displays a complete list of the words needed to complete the book and get bonus points.

== Reception ==
The editors of Computer Gaming World presented Bookworm with their 2003 "Puzzle Game of the Year" award. They wrote, "PopCap's ultimate achievement is in taking simple elements that anyone can learn and turning them into raging, overwhelming obsessions. It's something commercial games with 50 times the budget (hey, Deus Ex 2!) often can't match." Guinness World Records named Bookworm the most downloaded word puzzle game in June 2010. The American Library Association awarded the game with the "Notable Computer Software for Children" award in 2007.
