= List of PC games (P) =

The following page is an alphabetical section from the list of PC games.

== P ==
Name	Developer	Publisher	Genre(s)	Operating system(s)	Date released
PAC-MAN 256	Bandai Namco Studios Vancouver; Hipster Whale; 3 Sprockets	Bandai Namco Entertainment	Action, arcade	Microsoft Windows, Linux, macOS	June 21, 2016
Paladins	Hi-Rez Studios	Hi-Rez Studios	Hero shooter, First-person shooter	Microsoft Windows, macOS	May 8, 2018
Paint the Town Red	South East Games	South East Games	Action, Beat 'em up, Roguelite	Microsoft Windows, Linux, macOS	July 29, 2021
Papers, Please	3909 LLC	3909 LLC	Puzzle, simulation	Microsoft Windows, Linux, macOS	August 8, 2013
ParaWorld	SEK	Sunflowers	Real-time strategy	Microsoft Windows	September 15, 2006
Partisans 1941	Alter Games	Daedalic Entertainment	Real-time tactics, stealth	Microsoft Windows	October 14, 2020
Party Golf	Giant Margarita	Giant Margarita	Sports, Indie	Microsoft Windows	October 25, 2016
Path of Exile	Grinding Gear Games	Grinding Gear Games	Action RPG	Microsoft Windows	October 23, 2013
Pathogenic	Abberant Labs	Slug Disco	Twin-stick shooter	Microsoft Windows, MacOS, Linux	July 14, 2026
Pavilion	Visiontrick Media		Puzzle, Action		September 23, 2016
Payday: The Heist	Overkill Software	Sony Online Entertainment	First-person shooter	Microsoft Windows	October 18, 2011
Payday 2	Overkill Software	505 Games	First-person shooter	Microsoft Windows	August 13, 2013
Payday 3	Starbreeze Studios	Deep Silver	First-person shooter	Microsoft Windows	September 21, 2023
PC Building Simulator	The Irregular Corporation	The Irregular Corporation	Simulation	Microsoft Windows	January 29, 2019
PC Building Simulator 2	The Irregular Corporation	Epic Games	Simulation	Microsoft Windows	October 26, 2022
Pentiment	Obsidian Entertainment	Xbox Game Studios	Adventure; role-playing	Microsoft Windows	November 15, 2022
Penumbra: Black Plague	Frictional Games	Paradox Interactive	Survival horror	Microsoft Windows, Linux, macOS	February 12, 2008
Penumbra: Overture	Frictional Games	Frictional Games	Survival horror	Microsoft Windows, Linux, macOS	March 30, 2007
Penumbra: Requiem	Frictional Games	Paradox Interactive	Survival horror	Microsoft Windows, Linux, macOS	August 27, 2008
Persona 3 Portable	Atlus	Sega	Role-playing; social simulation	Microsoft Windows	January 19, 2023
Persona 3 Reload	P-Studio	WW: Sega; JP: Atlus	Role-playing; social simulation	Microsoft Windows	February 2, 2024
Persona 4 Arena Ultimax	Arc System Works; P-Studio	Sega	Fighting	Microsoft Windows	March 17, 2022
Persona 4 Golden	Atlus	Sega	Role-playing, social simulation	Microsoft Windows	June 13, 2020
Persona 5 Royal	P-Studio	JP/NA: Atlus; PAL: Deep Silver	Role-playing; social simulation	Microsoft Windows	October 21, 2022
Persona 5 Strikers	Omega Force; P-Studio	WW: Sega; JP: Atlus	Action role-playing; hack and slash	Microsoft Windows	February 23, 2021
Persona 5 Tactica	P-Studio	WW: Sega; JP: Atlus	Tactical role-playing	Microsoft Windows	November 17, 2023
Phantom Doctrine	CreativeForge Games	Good Shepherd Entertainment	Strategy	Windows	August 14, 2018
Phasmophobia	Kinetic Games	Kinetic Games	Survival horror, Investigation game	Microsoft Windows	September 18, 2020
Pico Park	TECOPARK	TECOPARK	Puzzle-platformer, co-op	Microsoft Windows	May 7, 2021
Pico Park 2	TECOPARK; Gemdrops, Inc.	TECOPARK	Puzzle-platformer, co-op	Microsoft Windows	September 12, 2024
Pillars of Eternity	Obsidian Entertainment	Paradox Interactive	Role-playing	Microsoft Windows, Linux, macOS	March 26, 2015
Pillars of Eternity	Obsidian Entertainment	Paradox Interactive	Role-playing	Microsoft Windows, Linux, macOS	March 26, 2015
Pirate101	KingsIsle Entertainment	KingsIsle Entertainment	MMORPG	Microsoft Windows, macOS	October 15, 2012
Pixel Gun 3D	Cubic Games	Cubic Games	First-person shooter, battle royale	Microsoft Windows	July 28, 2013
Pixel Piracy	Quadro Delta	Re-Logic	Action-adventure	Microsoft Windows, Linux, OS X	February 16, 2016
Plague Inc: Evolved	Ndemic Creations	Ndemic Creations	Strategy, simulation	Microsoft Windows, Linux, macOS	February 18, 2016
Planet Coaster	Frontier Developments; Aspyr (macOS)	Frontier Developments	Construction and management simulation	Microsoft Windows, macOS	November 17, 2016
Planet Coaster 2	Frontier Developments	Frontier Developments	Construction and management simulation	Microsoft Windows	November 6, 2024
Planetarian: The Reverie of a Little Planet	Key	VisualArt's, KineticNovel	Visual novel	Microsoft Windows	November 29, 2004
Planetary Annihilation	Uber Entertainment	Uber Entertainment	RTS	Microsoft Windows, Linux, macOS	September 5, 2014
PlanetSide	Sony Online Entertainment	Sony Online Entertainment	MMOFPS	Microsoft Windows	May 20, 2003
PlanetSide Arena	Daybreak Game Company	Daybreak Game Company	MMOFPS	Microsoft Windows	September 19, 2019
PlanetSide 2	Rogue Planet Games	Daybreak Game Company	MMOFPS	Microsoft Windows, PlayStation 4	November 12, 2012
Planets Under Attack	Targem Games	TopWare Interactive	RTS, strategy	Microsoft Windows, macOS	September 27, 2012
Planet Zoo	Frontier Developments	Frontier Developments	Construction and management	Microsoft Windows	November 5, 2019
Plants vs. Zombies	PopCap Games	Electronic Arts	Tower defense	Microsoft Windows, macOS	May 5, 2009
Plants vs. Zombies: Battle for Neighborville	PopCap Games	Electronic Arts	Third-person shooter	Microsoft Windows	October 18, 2019
Plants vs. Zombies: Garden Warfare	PopCap Games	Electronic Arts	Third-person shooter	Microsoft Windows	June 24, 2014
Plants vs. Zombies: Garden Warfare 2	PopCap Games	Electronic Arts	Third-person shooter	Microsoft Windows	February 25, 2016
Plants vs. Zombies: Replanted	PopCap Games	Electronic Arts	Tower defense	Microsoft Windows	October 23, 2025
Playboy: The Mansion	Cyberlore Studios	Arush Entertainment, Groove Games	Business simulation game	Microsoft Windows	March 4, 2005
PlayerUnknown's Battlegrounds	PUBG Corporation, Lightspeed & Quantum Studios (mobile)	PUBG Corporation (Windows), Microsoft Studios (Xbox One), Tencent Games (mobile)	Multiplayer online game, Battle royale game	Microsoft Windows	December 12, 2017
Playboy: The Mansion	Cyberlore Studios	Arush Entertainment, Groove Games	Business simulation game	Microsoft Windows	March 4, 2005
Phoenotopia: Awakening	Cape Cosmic	Cape Cosmic	Action-adventure; Metroidvania; Platformer	Microsoft Windows, OS X	Jan 21, 2021
PO'ed: Definitive Edition	Nightdive Studios	Nightdive Studios	First-person shooter	Microsoft Windows	May 16, 2024
Pokémon Showdown	Zarel	Zarel	Strategy, Turn-based tactics	Microsoft Windows, Linux, macOS	September 9, 2012
Pokemon Planet	Brody	Brody	MMORPG	Microsoft Windows, OS X, Linux	2014
Pokémon TCG Online	Dire Wolf Digital	The Pokémon Company	Digital collectible card game	Microsoft Windows, OS X	March 24, 2011
Police Quest: SWAT 2	Yosemite Entertainment	Sierra FX	Real-time tactics	Microsoft Windows	July 11, 1998
The Political Machine 2020	Stardock	Stardock	Government simulation	Microsoft Windows	March 3, 2020
Pony Island	Daniel Mullins Games	Daniel Mullins Games	Indie	Microsoft Windows	January 4, 2016
Pool of Radiance	Strategic Simulations, Inc.	Strategic Simulations, Inc., Pony Canyon (PC9800, X1)	Fantasy, RPG	MS-DOS, Amiga, Apple II, Commodore 64, PC-9800 series, X1	1988
Pools of Darkness	Strategic Simulations, Inc., MicroMagic, Inc., Marionette (PC9800)	Strategic Simulations, Inc., Pony Canyon (PC9800)	Fantasy, RPG	Microsoft Windows, macOS, Amiga, PC-9800 series	1991
Poptropica	Jeff Kinney Group	Jeff Kinney Group	Virtual World	Microsoft Windows, Linux, macOS	July 2007
Poppy Playtime	Mob Entertainment	Mob Entertainment	Survival horror, puzzle	Microsoft Windows	October 12, 2021
Portal	Valve	Valve, Microsoft Game Studios	Puzzle-platform game	Microsoft Windows, Linux, macOS	October 10, 2007
Portal 2	Valve	Valve	Puzzle-platform game	Microsoft Windows, Linux, macOS	April 19, 2011
Portal Knights	Keen Games	505 Games	Action role-playing, sandbox	Microsoft Windows	May 18, 2017
Postal	Running with Scissors	Running with Scissors	Top-down shooter	Android, Microsoft Windows, Mac OS, OS X, Linux	November 14, 1997
Postal 2	Running with Scissors	Running with Scissors	First-person shooter	Microsoft Windows, Linux, OS X	April 13, 2003
Postal III	Running with Scissors	Akella	Third-person shooter	Microsoft Windows	November 23, 2011
Postal Redux	Running with Scissors	Running with Scissors	Shoot 'em up	Microsoft Windows	May 20, 2016
PowerWash Simulator	FuturLab	Square Enix Collective	Simulation	Microsoft Windows	July 14, 2022
PowerWash Simulator 2	FuturLab	FuturLab	Simulation	Microsoft Windows	October 23, 2025
PP: Pianissimo	Innocent Grey	Innocent Grey	Mystery	Microsoft Windows	September 29, 2009
Prince of Persia: The Sands of Time	Ubisoft Montreal	Ubisoft	Action-adventure, puzzle-platformer, hack and slash	Microsoft Windows	November 6, 2003
Prince of Persia: Warrior Within	Ubisoft Montreal, Pipeworks Software, Gameloft	Ubisoft, Gameloft	Action-adventure, platform, hack and slash	Microsoft Windows	November 30, 2004
Prison Architect	Introversion Software	Introversion Software	Construction and management simulation	Microsoft Windows, Linux, macOS	October 6, 2015
Pro Evolution Soccer 3	Konami Computer Entertainment Tokyo	Konami	Sports	Microsoft Windows	October 17, 2003
Pro Evolution Soccer 4	Konami Computer Entertainment Tokyo	Konami	Sports	Microsoft Windows	August 5, 2004
Pro Evolution Soccer 5	Konami Computer Entertainment Tokyo	Konami	Sports	Microsoft Windows	August 4, 2005
Pro Evolution Soccer 6	Konami	Konami	Sports	Microsoft Windows	October 27, 2006
Pro Evolution Soccer 2008	Konami	Konami	Sports	Microsoft Windows	October 26, 2007
Pro Evolution Soccer 2009	Konami	Konami	Sports	Microsoft Windows	October 17, 2008
Pro Evolution Soccer 2010	Konami	Konami	Sports	Microsoft Windows	October 23, 2009
Pro Evolution Soccer 2011	Konami	Konami	Sports	Microsoft Windows	October 8, 2010
Pro Evolution Soccer 2012	Konami	Konami	Sports	Microsoft Windows	October 14, 2011
Pro Evolution Soccer 2013	Konami	Konami	Sports	Microsoft Windows	September 20, 2012
Pro Evolution Soccer 2014	Konami	Konami	Sports	Microsoft Windows	September 20, 2013
Pro Evolution Soccer 2015	PES Productions	Konami	Sports	Microsoft Windows	November 11, 2014
Pro Evolution Soccer 2016	PES Productions	Konami	Sports	Microsoft Windows	September 15, 2015
Pro Evolution Soccer 2017	PES Productions	Konami	Sports	Microsoft Windows	September 13, 2016
Pro Evolution Soccer 2018	PES Productions	Konami	Sports	Microsoft Windows, Linux	September 12, 2017
Pro Evolution Soccer 2019	PES Productions	Konami	Sports	Microsoft Windows	August 28, 2018
Project I.G.I.	Innerloop Studios	Eidos Interactive	Stealth game	Microsoft Windows	December 15, 2000
Project Zomboid	The Indie Stone	The Indie Stone	Role-playing, survival horror	Microsoft Windows, Linux, macOS	November 8, 2013
Psychonauts 2	Double Fine	Xbox Game Studios	Platform; action-adventure	Microsoft Windows, Linux, macOS	August 25, 2021
