= PVZ =

PVZ or PvZ may refer to:

- Party for Zeeland (Partij voor Zeeland), a provincial political party in the province of Zeeland in the Netherlands
- Plants vs. Zombies, a video game franchise developed by PopCap Games
  - Plants vs. Zombies (video game), a 2009 tower defense video game and the first game of the video game series
- Póvoa de Varzim, a Portuguese city in the Norte Region and sub-region of Greater Porto
- Paige VanZant, an American mixed martial artist

== See also ==
- PVC, a chemical
