= Plants vs. Zombies: Social Edition =

2011 tower defense video game

- Developer: PopCap Games
- Publisher: Beijing Silver Crown Electronic Publishing
- Artist: Rich Werner
- Composers: Laura Shigihara; Jiang Hao
- Series: Plants vs. Zombies
- Engine: Adobe Flash
- Platform: Renren
- Release: June 2011
- Genres: Tower defense, strategy
- Modes: Single-player, multiplayer

Plants vs. Zombies: Social Edition (Note: Also known as Plants vs. Zombies Social. The main subtitle is sometimes written with no colon.) (Chinese: 植物大战僵尸社区版; pinyin: zhíwù dàzhàn jiāngshī shèqū bǎn) was an online tower defense video game developed by the Shanghai division of PopCap Games and published by Beijing Silver Crown Electronic Publishing. Made in collaboration with the Chinese social networking service Renren, it was an online version of the original Plants vs. Zombies (2009) that added social networking features and additional content, and was exclusively hosted on the service's website from June 2011 to September 30, 2014. The game was developed due to the increasing popularity of the Plants vs. Zombies franchise in China, and as a response to widespread piracy of the original in the country.

Social Edition was announced by PopCap and Renren in May 2011. The game was regularly updated to add new content, including several collaborations with different brands that came with limited time items and plants.

== Gameplay ==
Social Edition retained the core gameplay of the original Plants vs. Zombies, with players using a variety of plants to defend against hordes of zombies. Unlike the original, Social Edition's Adventure mode only included 4 stages, with each stage containing 6 levels. Individual levels had more frequent zombies, making the game more difficult. It also included in-app purchases. Most additional content integrated social networking features, with players being able to interact with one another and compare leaderboard scores. Each player had their own town, which they could personalize to reflect their taste or play style, and invite friends to visit.

Several new modes were present in Social Edition. Challenge mode was unlocked after beating the eight level, with Crazy Dave giving the player a set of 18 "challenge dojo" levels. These play similarly to the survival modes from the original game, but cost "energy" to play and give extra rewards. Rampage mode, unlocked after beating level 5, was a weekly challenge where players start with 1,500 sun, which they used to defend against a zombie attack separated into two-minute waves. Killing zombies gave the players points, and extra points for remaining plants on the lawn would be awarded if they won the wave. Once a new wave started, the Rabbit Imp zombie would appear from one of three possible positions, and added a multiplier to the score if killed; if not, a robotic hand would stretch out and take it off the lawn. The player's final score was added to the mode's leaderboard. PC Gamer's Owen Hill compared Rampage mode's concept to PopCap's iOS port of Bejeweled Blitz (2010) for Facebook, as both provided "quick, competitive bursts of play through a browser."

== History and development ==
Plants vs. Zombies: Social Edition was a Chinese adaption of Plants vs. Zombies, a tower defense video game released by PopCap Games in 2009. After releasing in China, Plants vs. Zombies became one of the countries top pirated PC games and large amounts of counterfeit merchandise entered its markets. James Gwertzman, then-head of strategic development at PopCap, recalled that the company saw this wave of piracy as an indication they should begin to officially distribute franchise merchandise in the country; Gwertzman later stated that piracy was "an incredibly efficient way to distribute intellectual property" at the 2011 Game Developers Conference (GDC) due to PopCap's increased IP protection backfiring, hurting their public perception in China and putting stress on their contracts for official products. This market potential inspired the company to create exclusive ports of for Plants vs. Zombies the country, including Social Edition and Plants vs. Zombies: Great Wall Edition, the latter proving to be extremely profitable.

Social Edition was developed by PopCap's Shanghai studio. It was made as an exclusive partnership with the Chinese social networking service Renren, marking the first time a Western game developer had done such a release with the website.

== Promotion and release ==
Social Edition was announced on May 17, 2011, through a press statement between PopCap and Renren. Gwertzman, who was also the Vice president of PopCap's Asia Pacific sectors at the time, expressed in it that the franchise had "unprecedented brand awareness and popularity in China," noting that almost one million people had already signed up for the game on Renren. Similarly, Renren CEO Joseph Chen showed gratitude that the studio had prioritized the Chinese market. PopCap had originally intended for new zombies and power-ups to be added each week. Social Edition released on Renren in June 2011 and was published by Beijing Silver Crown Electronic Publishing. After Electronic Arts acquired PopCap in July 2011, a presentation shown during an investor meeting implied that the Peggle and Plants vs. Zombies franchises would be made into Facebook games, leading to speculation that Social Edition would be localized for a broader audience.

=== Brand partnerships ===
Advertisement featuring the Super Chomper plant, who was made to promote a brand of drinks manufactured by Bright Food.

During its lifespan, Social Edition did in-game partnerships with several different brands. The first of these was with Chinese food and beverage company Bright Food for their Guangming Dairy brand of drinks, lasting from July to New Year's Eve 2011, which added daily login rewards and Super Chomper, an improved version of the pre-existing Chomper plant that could be obtained by using codes found on purchased drinks; unlike the regular Chomper, which was limited to eating one zombie at a time, Super Chomper ate all zombies in front of it. From June to September 2012, the game partnered with Spanish confectionary brand Chupa Chups for a similar ad campaign, including new decorations and the limited edition plant Calm Chuck (based on the company's Chupa Chuck mascot), who could protect an entire column of plants when placed.
