= Plants vs. Zombies Comics =

American comic book series based on Plants vs. Zombies

- Created by: Paul Tobin (writer); Ron Chan (illustrator)
- Owners: Dark Horse Comics (via Electronic Arts and PopCap Games)
- Years: 2013–present

Print publications
- Comics: Ongoing series: Plants vs. Zombies (2013–present) Garden Warfare (2016–2019): Individual volumes: Lawnmageddon (2013–2015) 2015: Timepocalypse Bully For You Grown Sweet Home Petal to the Metal (2016) 2017: Boom Boom Mushroom Battle Extravagonzo Lawn of Doom 2018: The Greatest Show Unearthed Rumble at Lake Gumbo War and Peas 2019: Dino-Might Snow Thanks Battle for Neighborville A Little Problem 2020: Better Homes and Guardens The Garden Path Multi-ball-istic 2021: Constructionary Tales Dream a Little Scheme 2023: Faulty Fables Impfestation The Unpredictables Zapped (2024) The Big Spitball (2025) It's a Dogz Life (2026)

Plants vs. Zombies Comics is an iOS app hosting a succession of comic book limited series written by Paul Tobin, drawn by Ron Chan, alongside backup artists Andie Tong and Jacob Chabot and colorist Matthew J. Rainwater. published by Dark Horse Comics, and based on the 2009 video game and subsequent franchise of the same name created by George Fan. The series chronicles the adventures of teenagers Nate Timely and Patrice Blazing as they protect Neighborville from the zombie armies of Dr. Zomboss, with the help of Patrice's uncle, "Crazy Dave" Blazing, and his own legion of genetically modified sentient plants. The series, originally digitally published from July and August 2013 as Plants vs. Zombies: Lawnmageddon, was subsequently expanded to an ongoing series, with Dark Horse Comics starting a monthly release of the comic series, in both digital and print (with every three issues forming a separate graphic novel) in 2015, incorporating elements from the 2013 sequel Plants vs. Zombies 2. Receiving a generally positive critical reception, with over one million issues sold worldwide, the series was nominated for the Eisner Award for "Best Lettering" in 2016, losing to Trashed.

Several spin-off limited series based on the television series and video game Plants vs. Zombies: Garden Warfare have also been published, with elements from the comic book series later adapted to the franchise's video game instalments, and vice-versa, in particular Patrice being made available as a playable character in the beta release of Plants vs. Zombies 3 in 2021.

== Premise ==
When a zombie army led by Dr. Edgar Zomboss invades the town (later city) of Neighborville, and Zomboss unleashes a machine creating a cloud of stink and horror in the air that blocks out the Sun, teenagers Nate Timely and Patrice Blazing meet and team up to fight the zombies and get rid of the cloud, making use of their own army of genetically modified plants, created by Patrice's uncle, Crazy Dave.

== Characters ==
Protagonists

- Nathaniel/Nathan "Nate" Timely – A pizza-loving slacker who with his best friend Patrice seeks to defend the world against zombies, with his unconventional thinking style often leading to unexpected victory.
- Patrice Blazing – An intelligent young red-haired martial artist, who with her best friend Nate seek to defend the world against zombies, commanding the plant armies of her uncle "Crazy Dave" Blazing, able to understand the "Dave-talk" language he created for secrecy.
- Crazetopher David "Crazy Dave" Blazing III – Patrice's uncle and a mad scientist, who breeds various strains of sentient genetically modified plants in preparation to defend the world against a coming zombie invasion.

Antagonists

- Dr. Edgar Zomboss – The leader of the zombie armies, who seeks to enslave the city of Neighborville and then the world in order to more regularly consume human brains.
- The Anti-Bully Squad – Former friends of Dr. Zomboss' from college, from whom he stole Mr. Stubbins, who seek to conquer the city of Neighborville in his stead for Zomboss' exposure and embarrassment of zombie-kind. Consisting of Mr. Grim-Brim, Stilts, and Greg-Gantuar, they work for the ZNN (Zombie News Network).
- "Big Trouble" – A swimsuit-wearing Gargantuar zombie who seeks to supplant Mr. Stubbins as Zomboss' second-in-command.
- The Cranium Cravers – A disco music dance troupe of zombies, consisting of Billy Shimmers (the group's leader), Fakespear and Phineas Fullvolume.
- Chestbeard – A human pirate with a hairy body, who seeks to conquer the city of Neighborville and plunder the treasures of its citizens, human and zombie alike.
- Frogpants, Nigel and Tugboat – Zomboss' closest trio of zombies, who seek to steal Zomboss' brain-flavoured Zomboss' Pop Smarts, a substitute brain source that his zombie army craves
- The Imps – Hardworking mini-sized zombies who control Zomboss' machinery, including Z-Mechs and the Citron Smasher.
- Mr. Stubbins – Dr. Zomboss' pet zombie hedgehog and second-in-command, who previously belonged to the Anti-Bully Squad. The smartest zombie in existence, Stubbins seeks to usurp Zomboss and become "King of all Zombies".

Other characters

- The Citizens of Neighborville – Residents of the city of Neighborville, who often find themselves victim to zombie attacks. The only named residents are Mr. Bollywood, Ms. Flipperflutter, Harvey Ceilingbanger, Ms. Shonee, Merle, Pearl, Zach, Mack, Judy, Rudi, Mrs. Isaacson, Mr. Quinn, Mrs. Laghari, and Mr. Person.
  - Louie – A construction worker and the first human to encounter the zombie armies of Dr. Zomboss.
- The Boom Boom Mushroom – A Doom Shroom capable of surviving its explosions, motivated to hold back Zomboss' army by its desire to continue watching television and eating popcorn undistracted.
- The Kelptomaniac – A clumsy Tangle Kelp mistaken for a master thief, whose name is a play on "kleptomaniac".

== Development ==
In August 2013, Plants vs. Zombies writer Paul Tobin attributed the series development to a pitch given to him by Dark Horse Comics editor Philip Simon, after Plants vs. Zombies developers PopCap Games had asked for him to write the series based on his Marvel Adventures comic book line, "expanding" the series' world "wide-open". On accepting the position, Tobin deigned too "specifically sta[y] away from the origin of the zombies", believing it would "diminis[h] the mystery and the fun of a project", and election to have the story revolve around two young characters: Nate and Patrice, and bring on illustrator Ron Chan. On adapting Tobin's words to art, Chan stated:

"I [always] try my best to bring the script to life as best as possible even if it's difficult, but also I know that if I want to take a little artistic license with some of it, Paul will still be happy with the result as long as the spirit of the comic is maintained. In Plants vs. Zombies: Petal to the Metal, I had a real hard time with it at first because I really didn't want to draw a bunch of cars and zombie tech!! But in the end, I trusted the script, worked hard, and once I finished it, was really proud of the work. Also, I tweeted at him that we should have a suplex in the book and he wrote me an entire page of zombies getting suplexed."

== Reception ==
The series has received a generally positive critical reception, with IGN comparing the series brand of humor as similar to Axe Cop, "revel[ling] in the absurdity of [the Plants vs. Zombies universe] and the idea that zombies have their own civilization completely separate from the human world", with there being "enough to the mythology of this kooky universe to justify an ongoing series".

In 2015, the series was nominated for the 2016 Eisner Award for "Best Lettering", losing to Trashed.

== In other media ==
- To commemorate the 30th anniversary of Dark Horse Comics in 2016, a promotional mural was commissioned from Duncan Fegredo depicting characters from the company's most popular title interacting, including the Plants vs. Zombies comic book series.
- Nate Timely and Patrice Blazing were made available as playable characters in the beta release of Plants vs. Zombies 3 in 2021, after the characters' creator and Plants vs. Zombies writer Paul Tobin had previously expressed interested in the character appearing in future games in August 2013, saying "I don't know if Patrice and Nate will never make it in the games per se. It would be kind of fun to see them, but right now they are comic-specific".

== Webtoon ==
The comic was rereleased as a vertical scrolling webcomic on Webtoon starting in 2025.
