= BFN =

BFN may refer to:

- Internet slang for "Bye for now"
- Federal Agency for Nature Conservation (Bundesamt für Naturschutz) a German scientific authority
- Star Wars: Episode I: Battle for Naboo, a video game released for the Nintendo 64 and Microsoft Windows
- Plants vs. Zombies: Battle for Neighborville, a 2019 video game in the Plants vs. Zombies franchise
- Bram Fischer International Airport, IATA code
- Browns Ferry Nuclear Plant
