= Plants vs. Zombies: Replanted =

2025 video game

- Developers: PopCap Games; The Lost Pixels
- Publisher: Electronic Arts
- Composers: Laura Shigihara; The String Revolution (Note: The String Revolution was commissioned to make a track intended for Replanted, but was reassigned to a bonus track in a Plants vs. Zombies 2xLP vinyl collaboration with Iam8bit.)
- Series: Plants vs. Zombies
- Engine: Unity
- Platforms: Nintendo Switch; Nintendo Switch 2; PlayStation 4; PlayStation 5; Windows; macOS; iOS; iPadOS; Xbox One; Xbox Series X/S
- Release: October 23, 2025
- Genres: Tower defense, strategy
- Modes: Single-player, multiplayer

Plants vs. Zombies: Replanted is a 2025 tower defense video game developed by PopCap Seattle, The Lost Pixels, (Note: The Lost Pixels is a Canadian independent game developer, consisting of former members of Electronic Arts.) and published by Electronic Arts. It is a remaster of the 2009 game Plants vs. Zombies, introducing high-definition graphics and new additional content.

Plants vs. Zombies: Replanted was released for video game consoles and personal computers on October 23, 2025, and soon to iOS, iPadOS, and macOS devices on December 3, 2026, under Apple Arcade. It received generally positive reviews from critics, but was criticized by the original game's development team for including fabricated concept art and mishandling the soundtrack.

== Gameplay ==
Plants vs. Zombies: Replanted follows the same gameplay of the original Plants vs. Zombies game with very minor changes. It is a lane-based tower defense game where the player has to defend their home from incoming zombies. The player can place various plants by spending "sun", the game's currency during levels. Sun icons can be collected from the sky during daytime and from sun-producing plants such as sunflowers. Some plants can attack zombies while some can act as defense.

If all zombies are defeated in a level, the player wins. If a zombie reaches the left side of the line, a lawn mower—or other similar, relevant object—will activate and clear the row of any zombies, but if the lawn mower has already been used, and another zombie crosses, the game is over.

=== Replanted features ===
Plants vs. Zombies: Replanted supports widescreen and resolutions up to 4K, in comparison to the original game's static 800x600 resolution and 4:3 aspect ratio. Replanted now has full controller support and features local multiplayer modes ported from the original game's seventh generation console ports: co-op, where two players play together with assigned roles; and Versus, where one plays as the plants and the other as the zombies. No online multiplayer is planned, however support for Steam Remote Play was later added in a patch as an alternative for Windows users.

Replanted also contains quality-of-life features. Gameplay can now be sped up by the player's will, with a max speed increase of 2.5x. Sun icons can now be mass collected using the "Sun Magnet." On Windows, players can quick-select plants from their seed bank using the respective number keys as hotkeys.

Replanted introduces two new game modes. "Cloudy Day" is a set of non-linear levels in the Adventure campaign. These levels only allow Sunflowers as sun-producing plants. During these levels, the amount of sun dropped from the sky and produced by plants are lowered. At certain times, rain clouds will move over the lawn. While these clouds are present, sun will stop appearing from the sky and from Sunflowers. However, all plants will cost around half their original price and have significantly faster recharge times. "R.I.P. Mode" is a harder difficulty of the Adventure campaign, but the player is forced back to the beginning if they lose a single level.

Replanted additionally features "bonus levels" included as non-linear levels in the Adventure campaign. These include 10 new minigames that were previously unused in the original game. (Note: The bonus levels can be played in the original game by accessing a hidden "Limbo" page which included these levels. This is the first time these levels are officially used.) In a later update, Replanted added "Survival: Endless" levels to all five areas of the game instead of just the daytime pool.

== Development ==
The existence of a Plants vs. Zombies remaster was revealed in an interview with Janet Robin from The String Revolution, who did a vinyl collaboration with the franchise in 2025 with Iam8bit. Robin stated that EA commissioned them to record an acoustic composition of the track "Crazy Dave" to be used for an "anniversary edition" of the game. The song would be additionally be a tribute to the song "Bad Guy", which artist Billie Eilish has stated to be somewhat similar to the track.

Plants vs. Zombies: Replanted was officially announced in a Nintendo Direct presentation in late July 2025. As an incentive, people who pre-ordered the game are given an in-game retro-styled skin of the Peashooter. Replanted was showcased at PAX West on August 25, 2025.

A developer diary for Plants vs. Zombies: Replanted was uploaded to YouTube on October 17, 2025. The commentary featured general director Nick Reinhart, executive producer Jake Neri, and brand director Matt Townsend. A developer panel for the game featuring the three was available during TwitchCon 2025.

== Release ==
Plants vs. Zombies: Replanted was released for Nintendo Switch, Nintendo Switch 2, PlayStation 4, PlayStation 5, Xbox One, Xbox Series X and Series S, and personal computers on October 23, 2025, alongside a day-one patch that fixed numerous bugs.

== Reception ==
=== Critical response ===
Reception

Aggregate scores
Aggregator	Score
Metacritic	(PC) 75/100 (XBSX) 73/100 (PS5) 76/100 (NS2) 75/100
OpenCritic	57% recommend

Review scores
Publication	Score
Game Informer	8/10
IGN	7/10
Nintendo Life	7/10
Nintendo World Report	8/10
Shacknews	9/10

The versions of Plants vs. Zombies: Replanted for Windows, PlayStation 5, and Nintendo Switch 2 received "generally favorable" reviews from critics, according to review aggregator website Metacritic, while the Xbox Series X version received "mixed or average" reviews. According to OpenCritic, 57% of critics recommended it.

IGN's Alessandro Fillari called it "a good way to get re-acquainted with one of the quirkiest puzzle-strategy games of the 2000s", while acknowledging its questionable decisions. Shacknews' David Craddock said it was his favorite version of Plants vs. Zombies, stating, "it packs everything fans loved about the original game, plus lots more" while justifying its US$20 price. The Verge described Replanted as "a time capsule from a simpler, happier time". Kyle Hilliard from Game Informer praised its faithfulness, complimenting the new animations and character designs that did not alter its memorability.

Noah Hunter for Final Weapon described the remake as solid, though criticized the lack of certain features and containing bugs that gate it from being excellent. Ben Lyons from Gamereactor stated Replanted is the same as the original overall, despite believing the £18 price is not justified.

=== Original developers ===
Rich Werner, the original game's character designer, claimed that some concept art contained in the game, speculated to be for Plants vs. Zombies: Garden Warfare (2014), did not originate from the original's development. Werner also stated that concept art for the Disco Zombie is fabricated; the design for the Disco Zombie was created after the estate of Michael Jackson requested the original Dancing Zombie, who resembles Michael Jackson from his Thriller music video, be removed from the game.

Laura Shigihara initially was positive when the remaster was announced. However, she later expressed her dissatisfaction with the lack of dynamic music in the game. Dynamic music would later be implemented in a patch.
