= Plants vs. Zombies (video game) =

2009 video game

- Developer: PopCap Games
- Publisher: PopCap Games (Note: The PlayStation 3 and PlayStation Vita ports were published by Sony Online Entertainment.)
- Designer: George Fan
- Programmer: Tod Semple
- Artist: Rich Werner
- Writer: Stephen Notley (Note: Notley wrote the plant and zombie descriptions in the in-game Suburban Almanac.)
- Composer: Laura Shigihara
- Series: Plants vs. Zombies
- Engine: PopCap Framework
- Platforms: Windows; macOS; iOS/iPadOS; Xbox 360; PlayStation 3; Nintendo DS; Nintendo DSi; Android; Windows Phone/Windows 10 Mobile; PlayStation Vita; BlackBerry Tablet OS; BlackBerry 10
- Release: May 5, 2009: Windows, macOS; WW: May 5, 2009 iOS; WW: February 15, 2010 (iPhone/iPod Touch) iOS (iPad)/iPadOS; WW: April 1, 2010 Xbox 360; WW: September 8, 2010 Nintendo DS; NA: January 18, 2011; PAL: May 6, 2011 PlayStation 3; WW: February 8, 2011 Nintendo DSi; NA: March 14, 2011; PAL: May 6, 2011 Android; WW: May 31, 2011 (Amazon Appstore); WW: December 14, 2011 (Google Play) Kindle Fire; WW: November 14, 2011 Windows Phone; WW: June 23, 2011 Nook HD; WW: November 11, 2011 PlayStation Vita; NA: February 21, 2012; EU: February 22, 2012 BlackBerry 10; WW: January 30, 2013 Plants vs. Zombies FREE Android, iOS; WW: November 13, 2014
- Genres: Tower defense, strategy
- Modes: Single-player, multiplayer

Plants vs. Zombies is a 2009 tower defense video game developed and published by PopCap Games. First released for Windows and macOS, the game has since been ported to consoles, handhelds, and mobile devices. The player takes the role of a homeowner amid a zombie apocalypse. As a horde of zombies approaches along several parallel lanes, the player must defend their home by placing plants or fungi, which fire projectiles at the zombies, or otherwise detrimentally affect them, or aid the player. The player collects a resource called "sun" to place plants. If a zombie reaches the house on any lane, the player loses the level.

Plants vs. Zombies was designed by George Fan, who conceptualized it as a more defense-oriented sequel to his fish simulator game Insaniquarium (2001), then developed it into a tower defense game featuring plants fighting against zombies. The game took inspiration from the games Magic: The Gathering and Warcraft III, along with the movie Swiss Family Robinson. Its development spanned three and a half years. Rich Werner was the main artist, Tod Semple served as programmer, and Laura Shigihara composed the game's music. In order to appeal to both casual and hardcore gamers, the tutorial was designed to be simple and spread throughout the game.

Plants vs. Zombies was critically acclaimed, nominated for multiple awards, including "Download Game of the Year" and "Strategy Game of the Year" as part of the Golden Joystick Awards 2010, and has since been considered one of the best mobile games ever made and one of the greatest video games of all time. Reviewers praised the game's humorous art style, simplistic but engaging gameplay, and soundtrack. Upon release, it was the fastest-selling video game developed by PopCap Games and quickly became their best-selling game, surpassing Bejeweled and Peggle. In 2011, PopCap was bought by Electronic Arts (EA). The company laid off Fan and 49 other employees, marking a change of focus to mobile and social gaming. After the buyout, Plants vs. Zombies was followed by a multimedia franchise including two sequels, three third-person shooters, two comic book series, and several spin-off games, most of which have received positive reviews. A remaster, titled Plants vs. Zombies: Replanted, was released in October 2025.

== Gameplay ==
A pool level is currently in progress. Zombies are progressing from the right in order to reach the house. The player has to place down plants in order to defend their house from the zombies.

Plants vs. Zombies is a tower defense video game in which the player defends their suburban home from zombies. The lawn is divided into a grid, with the player's house to the left. The player places different types of plants on individual squares of the grid. Each plant has a different style of defense, such as shooting, exploding, blocking. There are also support plants with creative abilities. Different types of zombies have their own special behaviors and their own weaknesses to different plants. For example, the Balloon Zombie can float over the player's plants, but its balloon can be popped by the Cactus. Other examples of zombies include the Disco Zombie which summons Backup Dancers around himself; and the Dolphin Rider Zombie, which rides on a dolphin in the water to jump over a plant. The zombies come in waves. With each wave defeated, another wave arrives and the density of zombies increases. At the end of every level, and often in the middle of levels too, there's an extra-large wave of zombies led by a flag-holding zombie.

The player can pick a limited number of types of plants through seed packets at the beginning of each level, and use a resource called "sun" to place them. The player collects sun by either clicking on sun icons that randomly appear over the lawn, or by using certain plants that generate sun, like Sunflowers and Sun-shrooms. Each type of plant recharges between each placement at various speeds. A shovel can be used to dig up and remove plants. Positioned at the left end of each lane is a single-use lawnmower, pool cleaner, or roof cleaner; if a zombie reaches this end, these will activate and kill all zombies in that lane. If a zombie reaches the end of that lane without any last line of defense, the game ends, which forces the player to restart the level (or streak for Vasebreaker Endless).

=== Adventure mode ===
There are five stages in the Adventure mode, each comprising ten levels. At the end of nearly every level, the player collects a new type of plant to use in subsequent levels. On the first level of stage two (level 2-1), zombies begin to occasionally drop in-game money when killed. After level 3-4, the player can spend the money at an in-game store called Crazy Dave's Twiddydinkies. Crazy Dave offers boosts that the player uses to upgrade already-placed plants and gardening tools for the player's Zen Garden, which is unlocked after level 5-4 and allows the player to water and maintain a group of plants, which are obtained as loot from killing zombies or purchasing them through his store; in return, the plants generate money for the player. Every stage's fifth level has a mini-game challenge, often utilizing a conveyor belt that gives various plants to the player. On every stage's tenth level, the player also receives plants from a conveyor belt. Stages one, three, and the first nine levels of stage five occur in daylight, while stages two, four, and the final level of stage five occur at night.

During the nighttime stages, the player should use the lower-cost fungi plants due to the lack of natural sun generation at night. Stages three and four take place in the house's backyard, which has six lanes (unlike the usual five lanes) and features a pool taking up the middle two lanes. On the pool, all plants except Tangle Kelp and Sea-shroom must be placed on top of Lily Pads which, unlike most plants, can be placed directly on pool lanes. Stage four has fog that obscures most of the lawn, and stage five takes place on the house's roof. This setting has the player use catapult plants, instead of the standard shooting plants, to account for the roof's upward slope. Also, all plants must be planted on top of a Flower Pot, which is the only plant able to be directly planted on the roof.

Adventure mode's last level pits the player against Dr. Edgar George Zomboss, an evil scientist and the zombies' animator. He destroys the player's plants by having his Zombot crush the plants or throw vans at them. He can additionally place fire and ice balls that roll across a lane. The player must subdue these balls with Ice-shrooms and Jalapeños respectively. After completing the Adventure mode, the player can choose to play it again, this time with plants unlocked from the previous play-through, along with three randomly selected plants to begin each level.

=== Other game modes ===
Three additional modes—Mini-Games, Puzzle, and Survival—become available once Adventure mode is completed. In Mini-Games mode, the player selects from a collection of twenty mini-games. These levels pose the player with unique challenges, each using some gimmick—often variants of a conveyor belt that gives the player certain plants.

In Puzzle mode, the player selects from two types of levels: "Vasebreaker" and "I, Zombie". In "Vasebreaker", the player breaks open a set of vases, each containing a plant or a zombie. The level ends when all the vases are smashed and all the zombies are killed by Plants. In "I, Zombie", the player places zombies to get past pre-placed cardboard cut-outs of plants, aiming to eat the brain at the end of each lane. If there are no zombies present in the lawn and not all 5 brains were eaten while having less than 50 sun (or for the case of its endless version, starting the next streak with sun count below 50), a game over occurs that forces the player to restart the puzzle (finite levels) or streak (endless version). Survival mode offers a selection of levels in which the player chooses plants to defeat increasingly challenging waves of zombies.

== Development ==
=== Concept ===
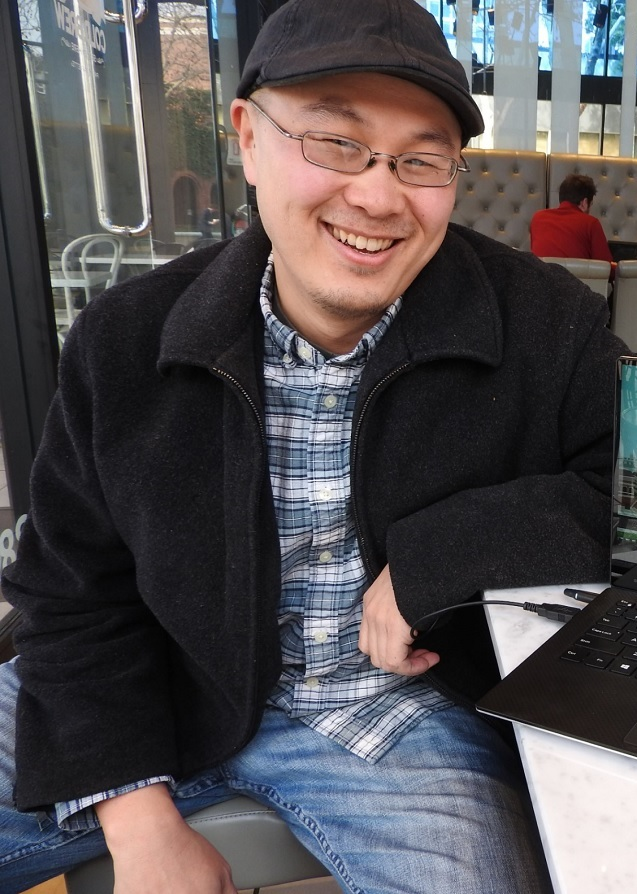
George Fan (pictured in 2018) is the creator and designer of Plants vs. Zombies.

Plants vs. Zombies was designed by George Fan. Imagining a more defense-oriented version of one of his previous titles, Insaniquarium (2001), and having played some Warcraft III tower defense mods, he was inspired to make a tower defense game. Fan considered a sequel to Insaniquarium for the Nintendo DS where each screen would represent a separate fish tank—one on top of the other. Aliens would attack the top fish tank and, if successful, would break into the bottom fish tank. Gameplay in the top tank would focus on defense against the aliens, while in the bottom tank it would revolve around resource generation, akin to Insaniquarium. But inspired by Warcraft III's towers, he felt that plants would make good defensive structures. He wanted to bring new concepts to the genre and believed the fact that enemies in tower defense games would never attack the towers was unintuitive. To address this, he began designing the five- and six-lane setups that would later be used in the final game. Enemies were at first the aliens from Insaniquarium, but while Fan was sketching concept art, he drew what he considered "the perfect zombie", and the theming was reworked. Fan went with using zombies instead of aliens in order to make the game stand out from other video games using plants.

Insaniquarium substantially influenced the development of Plants vs. Zombies. The games have similar pacing, determined by the "drip-feeding" of pets and plants respectively, and choosing plants at the beginning of each Plants vs. Zombies level is analogous to choosing pets in Insaniquarium. Fan also took inspiration from the film Swiss Family Robinson, in which a family defends themselves and their home against pirates. Fan included elements from the trading card game Magic: The Gathering, which he had played with his girlfriend, Laura Shigihara. Showing her how to customize their card decks inspired him to design Plants vs. Zombies with seed packets—instead of his original idea of a conveyor belt that gave random plants—due to the seed packet system's greater complexity. While the conveyor belt was dropped from the more common game mode, it remained a special element in select levels. The use of multitasking between lanes was influenced by and was featured prominently in the old arcade game Tapper.

When the game featured aliens, its working title was Weedlings, but Fan thought the name a poor fit because of how many gardening-themed video games were being released at the time. It was renamed Plants vs. Zombies as a placeholder after the enemies were changed. The planned name for most of development was Lawn of the Dead, a pun on the title of the George A. Romero zombie film Dawn of the Dead. Romero did not permit usage of the name, even after a plea from Fan, who sent Romero a video of himself dressed as a Zombie Temp Worker grunting and programming on a computer, subtitled with references to runtime errors. There were many other candidate names, including Residential Evil and Bloom & Doom, the latter of which was used as the branding on the in-game seed packets.

=== Design ===
Plants vs. Zombies was initially designed by Fan alone. Because Fan was a full-time employee at PopCap Games, the video game company helped build up a small team consisting of a composer (Laura Shigihara), a programmer (Tod Semple), and an artist (Rich Werner). Fan was based in San Francisco, while Werner was in Seattle. Stephen Notley is credited as being a writer for Plants vs. Zombies. He wrote the plant and zombie descriptions in the in-game guide, the Suburban Almanac. Fan found working in small teams to be easier than working in large teams. According to an interview with Edge, while searching for an artist, Fan discovered Rich Werner, whose work Fan thought matched with his design intentions. Fan attributed the design's intrigue to its animation scheme; Tod Semple suggested using Adobe Flash, which Fan worried would generate an animation "cut out from paper" and too closely resembling South Park, but he was ultimately satisfied, crediting Semple and Werner's talent. Plants vs. Zombies was made using PopCap Games's own engine: PopCap Framework. Fan consistently posted updates of Plants vs. Zombies every four months in an internal forum within PopCap Games called Burrito, where he accepted feedback from the employees of PopCap.

When the concept of Plants vs. Zombies was first established as a sequel to Insaniquarium, Fan wanted to make a game where the aliens invade the player's garden. Originally, his intent was to make a gardening game where plants are grown as an investment to afford defenses against an alien invasion. After Fan created the "perfect zombie", the enemies were changed from aliens to zombies. He trimmed the concept of simultaneously defending and maintaining the garden, feeling that the repetitive gardening detracted from the main gameplay. Simplifying the gardening system, Fan restructured the game's main aspects to fit better into the tower defense genre, and later added further elements inspired by other games. Fan enjoyed the idea of plants defending against the zombies, combining two distinct species that were not yet touched by other game developers at the time. Plants playing as the role of towers made sense to him, acting as stationary defense against the recurring waves of zombies. Zombies were designed to move in the current linear five- and six-lane system in the final game, allowing the enemy zombies to interact with the defensive plants, a refinement in the game that Fan felt worked as a unique gameplay mechanic to make Plants vs. Zombies stand out in the tower defense genre amongst other tower defense games popular at the time.

Plants vs. Zombies took three and a half years to make. Much of the first year of development focused on Adventure mode; Semple afterward suggested brainstorming concepts for Mini-Games mode. "Vasebreaker" and "I, Zombie" originated from those ideas as individual levels before Fan, who enjoyed tweaking them, separated them and their variants into Puzzle mode. During testing, Fan found that the additional modes detracted players from Adventure mode. Fan locked most of their levels, requiring advancement within Adventure mode to unlock them. Later, the development of Plants vs. Zombies consisted of Fan testing the game and writing down notes of what could be done to tweak it before sending them off to Semple. The last year of development had the team fine-tuning Plants vs. Zombies before release.

One of the critical aspects of the development was designing Plants vs. Zombies to be balanced between hardcore and casual gaming. Fan designed the tutorial to be simple and merged within the game to attract casual gamers. It had the player learning by performing actions, rather than reading about how to do the actions. The in-game messages were also made to be as short and easy-to-read as possible; with the dialogue from Crazy Dave being broken up into small chunks of text to match this. The in-game messages were also designed to match a player's skill set; an example being the message telling the player to place Peashooters further to the left would only pop up in an early level if a Peashooter was placed towards the right of the lawn and was eaten. The team discovered that newcomers to the genre of real-time strategy often had difficulty learning the importance of sun collection. The cost needed of the sun-generating Sunflowers was halved, encouraging the player to grow them instead of the attack-only Peashooter. The change forced restructuring of the balance between plants and zombies, a move that Fan said was worth the effort.

=== Characters ===
Early in the development of Plants vs. Zombies, time was spent brainstorming ideas for characters. Fan purposely gave all the plants and zombies names that matched their individual functions, designing them accordingly—for example, a Peashooter shoots pea projectiles, a Wall-nut acting as a wall. Fan also made all the plants stationary and all the zombies slowly move across their lane so the casual player would understand that the towers (the rooted plants) could not move and the attackers (the mindless zombies) could slowly move. The final designs of the zombies and plants changed little from their inception. The game's sole human character, Crazy Dave, was a parody of David Rohrl, a person Fan knew. Crazy Dave features a vocal performance by Fan.

The final game has 49 types of plants. Fan expressed fondness for the Tall-Nut, Torchwood, and Cob Cannon plants. He liked the Tall-Nut's character, citing its "determined gaze" and it shedding a single tear when hurt. In terms of strategy, he liked that the Torchwood—which gives Peashooters flaming ammunition—required the player to consider how plants interact with each other. Fan also liked the Squash, due to its name's wordplay; the plant crushes zombies. A proposed plant would have been placed above other plants to protect them from Bungee and Catapult Zombies; it was difficult, however, to visualize this plant's position. A similar defensive item (the Umbrella Leaf) made it into the final game, protecting plants from Bungee and Catapult Zombies, but placed next to plants. Many potential plants had concept art but were not in the final Plants vs. Zombies.

Plants vs. Zombies has 26 types of zombies. Fan's favorite zombie was Dr. Zomboss; the team spent a full month designing the fight against him at the end of the game. Fan liked the Pole Vaulting Zombie due to the likely amusement of its first encounter with the player; he gave an example of a player failing to block it with a Wall-Nut plant, with the zombie jumping over the obstruction. The Newspaper Zombie's first iteration simply read a newspaper, but Werner redrew the character as having become a zombie while reading on the toilet. Fan's brother asked him whether he based the zombie on their father, as he would often read the newspaper on the toilet. Fan said that while he had no such intention, it was his favorite backstory to a zombie. The Dancing Zombie initially resembled Michael Jackson from the music video for "Thriller". The zombie was present in the game before his death, but the entertainer's estate objected to its inclusion over a year following his death; PopCap replaced it with a more generic disco-dancing zombie. Many other zombies were cut during development.

=== Soundtrack ===
Shigihara composed Plants vs. Zombies's soundtrack, borrowing elements from pop music and console chiptune. Before the game's inception, Fan asked Shigihara to compose the music for his next title because he admired her music. She drew influence from Danny Elfman's soundtracks and a wide range of musical styles: One song uses marching band percussion and swing; another utilizes techno beats with "organic" sounds. Film music scholar K. J. Donnelly found the music to be bright and "cartoonish". He noted the music was not dynamically tied to gameplay, but instead progresses independently. He noted the soundtrack's design in a progressive style, "almost in parallel to the unfolding of the game[play]".

Shigihara described the music as "macabre, yet goofy". Examining the night stages, she explained that she used a combination of big band swing beats with "several haunting and serious melodies". The songs "Loonboon" and "Brainiac Maniac" were written towards the end of production. Shigihara said these were reactionary songs she wrote to fit the game's feel after playing it through twice. Shigihara composed and performed the music video shown during the game's credits, titled "Zombies on Your Lawn". The song was inspired by "Still Alive", which played at the end of the video game, Portal. Plants vs. Zombies's tracks were eventually released as part of a downloadable soundtrack album.

== Promotion and release ==
On April 1, 2009, PopCap released a music video for "Zombies on Your Lawn" to promote Plants vs. Zombies. While many PC gamers were unsure if the video was an elaborate April Fools' Day joke, PopCap spokesperson Garth Chouteau revealed in an IGN interview that the game would soon be released for PC and Mac. On April 22, 2009, PopCap released an official game trailer of Plants vs. Zombies on YouTube. PopCap Games released a demo version on May 4, 2009, permitting thirty minutes of gameplay. Plants vs. Zombies was officially released for PC and Mac on May 5, 2009, along with the demo being replaced by a version where the player can play up to level 3-4. A free Adobe Flash version of Plants vs. Zombies was released on September 23, 2009.

A Game of the Year edition was released in July 2010. It was made available on Steam on August 10, 2010; anyone who already purchased the game could update to the new edition for free. The Game of the Year edition adds in a "Zombatar" feature allowing the player to customize a zombie's face. (Note: Some announcements of Plants vs. Zombies before its release had showcased Zombatar, but the feature was not included in the original game.) The edition also supports Steam Cloud, which lets the player access game save data from multiple computers.

=== Mobile phone versions ===
During the announcements for Plants vs. Zombies, PopCap Games revealed the game would be ported to other platforms after the PC release. In August 2009, it was announced on IGN that Plants vs. Zombies would be ported to the iPhone near the end of 2009. They announced the port's release date on a trailer on YouTube in February 2010, officially releasing it on February 15, 2010. The port included a modified interface for iPhone users and a Quick Play mode allowing the player to play any level in Adventure mode; it removed the Mini-Games, Puzzle, and Survival modes.

In March 2010, a technology blog named PadGadget found unintentionally public entries for ports of iPhone games to the iPad, Plants vs. Zombies among them. The game's iPad port, named Plants vs. Zombies HD, was released on April 5, 2010. It utilized the iPad's 11 touch sensors and restored the Survival mode and the Mini-Games mode, which includes an iPad-exclusive mini-game called "Buttered Popcorn". Subsequent iOS updates would add more content to their version of Plants vs. Zombies, including Zen Garden, additional mini-games, and additional achievements.

In May 2011, PopCap Games officially announced that Chuzzle would be available on the Amazon Appstore for Android devices for the next two weeks, with Plants vs. Zombies becoming available later in the month. They were both free on launch day and cost $2.99 after. On May 31, 2011, Plants vs. Zombies entered the Amazon Appstore. In December 2011, PopCap Games announced it would be releasing Plants vs. Zombies and Peggle through the Android Market. It was made available on Google Play Store on December 15, 2011.

Plants vs. Zombies has been ported to other mobile devices. On June 23, 2011, the game was released on the Windows Phone as part of Xbox Live. On November 14, 2011, and January 30, 2013, Plants vs. Zombies was released on the Kindle Fire and Blackberry 10 respectively as a launch app. Plants vs. Zombies was later released on another BlackBerry device, the BlackBerry Playbook. Plants vs. Zombies was released on Nook HD and Nook HD+ on November 14, 2012.

=== Console versions ===
Plants vs. Zombies was announced for the Xbox 360 in July 2010, to be available both on its own and as part of a bundle with Peggle and Zuma. The game was released on the Xbox 360 at Xbox Live on September 8, 2010. To ease use with the Xbox controller, the cursor was locked onto the lawn's grid pattern and sun would float towards the cursor. The port also featured Versus mode, a Co-op mode, and a new level in Mini-Games mode. Versus mode matched two players, one playing plants and one playing zombies. The zombie player's goal is reaching the house, while the plant player aims to kill three of the five target zombies on the right side of the lawn. A PlayStation Network port for the PlayStation 3 of Plants vs. Zombies was announced on January 28, 2011, with Sony Online Entertainment as its publisher, and was released on February 8, 2011.

The Nintendo DS port of Plants vs. Zombies was announced in August 2010. The port was released on January 18, 2011, in North America and on May 6, 2011, in Europe and Australia. The port included the Zombatar feature and the versus mode from the Xbox Live version, also adding four exclusive mini-games. On March 14, 2011, a Nintendo DSi port was released in North America for the DSiWare service. It was released on May 6, 2011, in Europe and Australia. The DSiWare version only kept the Adventure mode and Mini-Games mode; the mini-game levels consisted of the exclusive levels from the original DS and a new level called "Zombie Trap".

The PlayStation Vita port was announced in December 2011. It was released on February 21, 2012, in North America, and in Europe as a launch title on February 22, 2012; with Sony Online Entertainment serving as its publisher. The port allows the player to play using either the touch screen or the controllers. It also introduces the ability to shake the Vita to collect suns and money. Unlike other console versions, the game lacks a multiplayer setting.

== Reception ==
Reception

Aggregate score
Aggregator	Score
Metacritic	PC: 87/100 iOS: 92/100 (iPad) iOS: 93/100; X360: 89/100; DS: 81/100 (DSiWare) DS: 73/100; PS3: 85/100; PSVita: 77/100

Review scores
Publication	Score
1Up.com	A−
Destructoid	10/10
Edge	9/10
Eurogamer	9/10
GamePro	5/5
GameSpot	PC: 8.5/10; X360: 8.5/10; DS: 8/10
GameSpy	4.5/5
GamesRadar+	PC: 4.5/5; PSVita: 4/5
Gamezebo	4.5/5
IGN	9/10; DS: 8/10

=== Sales ===
On May 20, 2009, Plants vs. Zombies was declared the fastest-selling video game created by PopCap Games, quickly becoming their best-selling video game; surpassing their previous popular games: Bejeweled and Peggle. Fan estimated half of sales came from hardcore gamers. Larry Hryb, director of programming for Xbox Live, reported that Plants vs. Zombies was the thirteenth most purchased 2011 game on Xbox Live Arcade. Plants vs. Zombies was particularly successful on the App Store. According to PopCap, the iOS release of Plants vs. Zombies sold more than 300,000 copies during its first nine days, generating more than $1 million in gross sales. It rose to number one in sales and money grossed from a mobile video game before losing the spot nine days after release. As of April 2016, nine million copies have been downloaded across all iOS platforms.

=== Critical reception ===
According to Metacritic, Plants vs. Zombies received "generally favorable" reviews and "universal acclaim" on all platforms except the DSiWare version, which received "mixed or average" reviews. It has been considered one of the greatest video games of all time. Some reviewers found the core mechanic straightforward, but the game itself challenging. GamesRadar+'s Tom Francis said that Plants vs. Zombies was only casual in its easiness to understand its premise; he clarified, "There's nothing casual about the 30 goddamn hours we've spent, effectively, gardening." Seth Schisel from The New York Times said kids and adults alike would enjoy Plants vs. Zombies. Others disagreed: GameSpot editor Chris Watters said, "Tower defense veterans will have to endure a lot of simple, familiar action in order to find a real challenge, and the wait may prove too long for some"; GamePro's Tae Kim said that Plants vs. Zombies was not particularly easy or hard, and that he never had to restart despite being "terrible at these sorts of games." John Walker of Rock Paper Shotgun said the difficulty sometimes felt artificial.

Despite his criticism of the game's difficulty, Watters praised Plants vs. Zombies's constant introduction of new plants, which kept the game fresh. Eurogamer editor Christian Donlan agreed: every zombie challenges the player and each new plant allows for a new strategy. Many critics commended Plants vs. Zombies for its minimalistic tutorial allowing experimentation; some had believed the entire Adventure mode was a long tutorial, or a warmup, for other game modes. Many critics praised the game for the replay value offered by additional game modes; Francis said that by the time the player finishes Adventure mode; "the obscene wealth of other things to do already outweighs it for entertainment value."

The art style and music of Plants vs. Zombies have also been praised. Susan Arendt from The Escapist said "the music is excellent, [and] the art is charming and adorable." Many reviewers have called the graphics from Plants vs. Zombies "adorable". Watters praised the unit animation, elaborating that they had a "great sense of personality". Some drew attention to the game's humor. Wired's Earnest Cavalli said that while the idea behind Plants vs. Zombies sounds macabre, "every level of the game offers something to laugh about". Marc Saltzman from Gamezebo found humor in the game's many killing methods. IGN editor Daemon Hatfield praised the game's music; he called it a "catchy, organic soundtrack that becomes more intense as your yard is flooded with enemies". In contrast, Walker found the soundtrack "disappointing" and stated, "After the promise of the gorgeous music video, the hope of similarly catchy in-game tunes is not kept."

Critics commended the iPhone port of Plants vs. Zombies for being faithful to the PC version and for its Quick Play mode, but many were disappointed by its omission of the other game modes. (Note: Additional modes were later added through updates.) Many reviewers praised the iPad port's inclusion of the Mini-Games mode and the Survival mode, along with "Buttered Popcorn", the exclusive mini-game. The Xbox 360 port of Plants vs. Zombies was praised for its addition of exclusive game modes, including a Co-op mode and a Versus mode. The Nintendo DS port was commended for its four new mini-games and its versus mode from the Xbox 360 version, but was considered inferior in its animation and graphics. The port was also criticized for its comparatively high price, for the DS top screen's sole usage as an indicator of level progression, and for unstable frame rate. Many critics found the PS Vita version faithful to the PC version, though unsure about whether or not there enough significant additions in this version to recommend to someone who already has Plants vs. Zombies on another platform.

Ultima creator and mogul Richard Garriott said in 2011 that Plants vs. Zombies was his favorite game of all time.

=== Awards ===
Plants vs. Zombies was nominated for various categories in the GameSpot Best of 2009, 2009 Spike Video Game Awards, the 13th and 14th Annual Interactive Achievement Awards, the 10th Annual Game Developers Choice Awards, and the 6th and 7th British Academy Games Awards. It won the categories of "Download Game of the Year" and "Strategy Game of the Year" in the Golden Joysticks Awards 2010, and the category of "Best Casual Game" in the 7th International Mobile Gaming Awards. Electronic Arts (EA) claims that Plants vs. Zombies has won over 30 Game of the Year awards.

Awards Awards and nominations
Year	Award ceremony	Category	Result	Ref.
2009	2009 Spike Video Game Awards	Best PC Game	Nominated	
2009	2009 Spike Video Game Awards	Best Downloadable Game	Nominated	
2010	13th Annual Interactive Achievement Awards	Casual Game of the Year	Nominated	
2010	13th Annual Interactive Achievement Awards	Outstanding Achievement in Game Design	Nominated	
2010	10th Annual Game Developers Choice Awards	Best Game Design	Nominated	
2010	10th Annual Game Developers Choice Awards	Innovation Award	Nominated	
2010	10th Annual Game Developers Choice Awards	Best Downloadable Game	Nominated	
2010	6th British Academy Games Awards	Strategy in 2010	Nominated	
2010	Golden Joystick Awards 2010	Download Game of the Year	Won	
2010	Golden Joystick Awards 2010	Strategy Game of the Year	Won	
2010	Golden Joystick Awards 2010	Portable Game of the Year	Nominated	
2011	7th International Mobile Gaming Awards	Best Casual Game	Won	
2011	7th British Academy Games Awards	Strategy in 2011	Nominated	
2011	14th Annual Interactive Achievement Awards	Casual Game of the Year	Nominated	

== Legacy ==
=== George Fan's layoff and Octogeddon ===
PopCap Games and its assets were bought by Electronic Arts on July 12, 2011, for $750 million. Fifty employees were laid off from PopCap Games' Seattle studio on August 21, 2012, marking a switch of focus to mobile and social gaming. After a statement by Edmund McMillen, creator of The Binding of Isaac, rumors circulated that Fan was fired by EA because he opposed implementing pay-to-win mechanics in Plants vs. Zombies 2. Fan confirmed in a 2017 tweet that he had been laid off, and that he opposed the freemium aspects of Plants vs. Zombies 2, but did not link the two events.

Three former PopCap employees have argued against the notion that Fan was fired because of his concerns over the game, including Allen Murray, a former producer of Plants vs. Zombies 2. They said Fan was fired as part of the systematic lay-offs in August 2012, and was not even part of the Plants vs. Zombies 2 team; he was working on other ideas for games at the time, including a game called Full Contact Bingo. He had lost interest in Plants vs. Zombies when EA began envisioning the game as a huge franchise. Fan worked on the arcade game Octogeddon after being laid off, initially as part of a Ludum Dare contest. The game idea was received positively and Fan formed a company along with Werner, the artist of Plants vs. Zombies, and Kurt Pfeiffer, the programmer of the Xbox 360 port. They developed Octogeddon for several years, releasing it on February 8, 2018, to generally positive reviews, according to Metacritic.

=== Sequels and spin-offs ===
Since EA's acquisition of PopCap Games, Plants vs. Zombies has expanded into a franchise spanning many consoles and several genres. Plants vs. Zombies Adventures, a spin-off and social game, was released for Facebook on May 20, 2011, and closed on October 12, 2014. A mainline sequel named Plants vs. Zombies 2 was released for iOS on August 14, 2013. Plants vs. Zombies: Garden Warfare, a multiplayer third-person shooter, was released on February 25, 2014, for the Xbox 360, PlayStation 3, and Xbox One, and its sequel was released on February 23, 2016, for the PlayStation 4 and Xbox One. A digital collectible card game, Plants vs. Zombies Heroes, was released internationally for the iOS on October 18, 2016. The franchise released its third third-person shooter, Plants vs. Zombies: Battle for Neighborville, on October 18, 2019, for the PlayStation 4 and Xbox One. A third mainline title is currently in development for Android and iOS as of October 2020.

According to Metacritic, nearly all the sequels and spin-offs of Plants vs. Zombies received generally positive reviews. Despite his opposition to Plants vs. Zombies 2's freemium model, Fan has praised the series for delving into different genres, particularly Plants vs. Zombies Heroes for entering digital card-collecting; he hopes EA will continue the series into more genres while keeping the charm of the original.

=== Other media ===
In April 2012, PopCap announced that it had licensed Plants vs. Zombies merchandise to multiple distributors, serving as the first merchandising partnerships involving PopCap. During the development of Zen Pinball 2 and Pinball FX 2, Zen Studios and PopCap made a downloadable content (DLC) interactive pinball table based on Plants vs. Zombies and using PopCap assets. The DLC was released on September 4, 2012, in North America and September 5 in Europe.

In July and August 2013, Dark Horse Comics released six issues of a comic book adaptation miniseries onto an iOS app. The miniseries was called Lawnmageddon, written by Paul Tobin and drawn by Ron Chan. Dark Horse Comics continued releasing issues for the next two years. In 2015, Dark Horse Comics started a monthly release of the comic series, in both digital and print; every three issues formed a separate miniseries, with the first called Bully for You. Characters from the comic series were adapted into Plants vs. Zombies 3.

According to Chris Carter, editor-in-chief of Destructoid, Plants vs. Zombies is frequently referenced in pop culture. Fan said his favorite homage to the game is the Magic: The Gathering card "Grave Bramble", created as part of the Innistrad expansion. A re-creation of Plants vs. Zombies was added as a mini-game quest known as "Peacebloom vs. Ghouls" to World of Warcraft as part of the World of Warcraft: Cataclysm expansion. Shigihara provided some music for the quest. The song "Bad Guy" (2019) by Billie Eilish was inspired by the theme music for Plants vs. Zombies.

=== Remaster ===
During a Nintendo Direct presentation in July 2025, a remaster titled Plants vs. Zombies: Replanted was revealed. Described as "the definitive [Plants vs. Zombies] remaster", it includes high-definition video, multiplayer compatibility, additional game modes, and unreleased concept art. Replanted released for Windows, Nintendo Switch, Nintendo Switch 2, PlayStation 4, PlayStation 5, Xbox One, and Xbox Series X/S on October 23, 2025.
