= Plants vs. Zombies: Garden Warfare 2 =

2016 video game

- Developer: PopCap Games
- Publisher: Electronic Arts
- Director: Jeremy Vanhoozer
- Producer: Kyle Duncan
- Composer: Peter McConnell
- Series: Plants vs. Zombies
- Engine: Frostbite 3
- Platforms: PlayStation 4; Windows; Xbox One
- Release: NA: February 23, 2016; EU: February 25, 2016
- Genre: Third-person shooter
- Modes: Single-player, multiplayer

Plants vs. Zombies: Garden Warfare 2 (commonly abbreviated as PVZGW2 or GW2) is a third-person shooter video game developed by PopCap Games and published by Electronic Arts. It was released for PlayStation 4, Windows, and Xbox One in February 2016. It is the sequel to Plants vs. Zombies: Garden Warfare and the fourth game in the Plants vs. Zombies franchise. A successor, Plants vs. Zombies: Battle for Neighborville, was released in October 2019.

The game includes multiple online multiplayer game modes which can support 24 players per game, in which 12 players play as plants, and 12 play as zombies. There is also a story mode which includes missions given by Crazy Dave while playing as a plant, and Dr. Zomboss while playing as a zombie. A hub world is introduced called the Backyard Battleground, which consists of a town called Suburbia, split down the middle with plants on one side, and zombies on the other. Each side has a base for either plants or zombies, and in the middle of the town is a park which includes a King of the Hill match called the Flag of Power. The game takes place after the events of Plants vs. Zombies: Garden Warfare, which shows Dr. Zomboss taking over parts of Suburbia and renaming it to Zomburbia. Crazy Dave and the plants go to war with Dr. Zomboss to reclaim their home.

The game received "generally favorable" reviews on Metacritic. The game sold an estimated 279,000 units, and the retail version was the second best-selling game in its week of release in the UK.

== Gameplay ==
Plants vs. Zombies: Garden Warfare 2 is a Third-person Hero shooter, similar to Plants vs. Zombies: Garden Warfare, where the core gameplay largely remained the same as its predecessor. The addition of 10 new playable character classes (6 being immediately accessible, 2 being unlocked through a series of optional challenges and 2 that can only be played in game modes separate from the rest of the characters) almost doubled the amount of playable characters from 69 to 121. Classes have variants, which differ from each other in some ways while still usually fulfilling similar roles. For example, the Peashooter class has 10 variants. One of them is the Fire Pea, which inflicts fire damage, and another is the Agent Pea, whose bullets deal double damage when dealing a critical hit. Both of these variants have a different weapon and amount of HP, but they have the same hitbox and abilities.

New gamemodes include an inversion of Garden Ops, titled Graveyard Ops (where players defend a Garden or Graveyard against waves of NPCs), and Herbal Assault, an inversion of Gardens and Graveyards where the Zombies must defend bases that the Plants must capture. The playable classes differ from each other through their weapons, abilities, hitboxes, movement speeds etc. They fulfill different character archetypes, such as DPSs, healers, ranks and assassins. Most characters and modes (Team Vanquish, Garden Ops, etc.) from the original Garden Warfare are present in GW2. New abilities for returning characters were also introduced in Garden Warfare 2. The new plant classes are Citron, Rose, Kernel Corn and Torchwood. Plant classes returning from GW1 are the Peashooter, Sunflower, Cactus and Chomper. The new zombie classes are Imp, Super Brainz, Captain Deadbeard, and Hover Goat-3000. The Foot Soldier, All Star, Scientist and Engineer also make a return from GW1.

In Garden Warfare 2 every mode in the game that is not a mystery portal exclusive (Capture the Taco, Soil Survivors, etc.) can be played offline, in Split-screen, and against NPCs or in a private lobby with friends. Free additional content was released regularly until July 16, 2019. After this, minor updates to gamemode circulation and Rux's bazaar, and the anticheat were made in 2020 and 2024, respectively.

A hub world called the Backyard Battleground replaces a traditional title screen In the Backyard Battleground players can explore, find collectibles scattered in the world, and start a King of the Hill-style match against NPC enemies known as the Flag of Power When playing the Flag of Power, the game will send waves of enemy heroes and crates, containing either an NPC ally or coins to assist in the battle. In practically every map there are places to create either Plant or Zombie turrets, or to spawn weak NPCs, depending on which side the player is currently playing on. A shooting gallery and moon-based missions are also featured.

At the bases of both the Plants and the Zombies, there are several common features, including a Customization Room allowing the player to change and customize characters, Quest Boards with different objectives for Plants and Zombies rewarding stars and xp multipliers, sticker shops, a Multiplayer Portal, a Mailbox and NPCs that give quests relating to the story mode. Players can increase their rank by leveling up individual characters. Every ten levels players can promote their characters to gain currency and to showcase their promotion levels to other players. Players can use coins to buy cosmetics and playable characters from the sticker shop in the form of sticker packs. These packs essentially function like lootboxes. Additionally, an NPC called Rux is found in both bases. He sells more exclusive items, such as legendary and infinite cosmetics, and rare abilities. Upon buying out a slot of his shop (e.g. buying all the abilities he sells), he fills the slot with classic cosmetics and gestures, which are highly sought after items from GW1. His shop refreshes every two weeks. Players can earn coins from practically any activity in the game, like playing multiplayer matches, Garden or Graveyard ops or completing story mode quests.

The game also included many exclusive rewards for players who had played the original Garden Warfare. Players were able to use their Mailbox in either side's base to import all of the characters and abilities that they had unlocked in Garden Warfare. They could also receive loyalty rewards, the size of which depended on their rank in GW1. The rewards ranged from individual sticker packs to an exclusive character, the Unicorn Chomper. These rewards, however, were only available for around a year after Plants Vs Zombies: Garden Warfare 2 was released, until February 28, 2017.

Players who either pre-ordered or purchase the deluxe edition of Garden Warfare 2 will get many exclusive items, from emoji customizations to an exclusive Mass Effect-themed character, the Z7 Imp.

== Setting ==
The game takes place after the events of Garden Warfare. The Zombies turn the tide on the Plants and conquer Suburbia, which they rename Zomburbia. The Plants go to war against the Zombies to reclaim their home and fight for what is left of Suburbia.

In July 2015, it was announced that a three-part tie-in comic book series published by Dark Horse Comics was scheduled for release in October 2015. It is set before the events of Garden Warfare 2 and explains how the Zombies defeated the Plants and conquered Neighborville (Suburbia). The comics were successful, and now 31 total comics have been released.

== Development ==
A new Plants vs. Zombies video game was revealed in Electronic Arts' annual earning reports. A sequel to Garden Warfare was teased on June 8, 2015. A trailer for Plants vs. Zombies: Garden Warfare 2 was presented for the first time at E3 2015 as part of the presentation given by Microsoft and on August 22, 2015. A mashup with Mass Effect called Grass Effect was announced at Gamescom 2015. Players who pre-order the game would receive a Mass Effect-inspired mech-suit for the new class, The Imp. BioWare assisted PopCap with developing the Grass Effect mech-suit.

An open beta testing for the game was held from January 14, 2016, to January 18, 2016, for the PlayStation 4 and Xbox One. However, this was largely for multiplayer tuning, and many of the game modes and Backyard Battleground secrets were disabled. A trial version of the game was released by the end of April 2016. This version of the game allows players to play the game for up to ten hours.

They have released their first free content update called The Graveyard Variety Pack. It was released on March 8, 2016, and it contains some character balancing, a new map Aqua Center, and some Backyard Battleground changes and additions. Another pack, titled Trouble in Zombopolis, was released in June 2016. It adds a new map called Zombopolis, and several new characters. Trouble in Zombopolis: Part Two was released in June 2016, introducing new features such as community challenges, delivering challenges, platforming elements, and new spawn points. EA partnered with Diamond Select Toys to release action figures featuring Garden Warfare 2 characters.

== Reception ==
Reception

Aggregate score
Aggregator	Score
Metacritic	PC: 82/100; PS4: 81/100; XONE: 80/100

Review scores
Publication	Score
Computer Games Magazine	9.5/10
Destructoid	9/10
Electronic Gaming Monthly	7.5/10
Game Informer	8/10
GameRevolution	3.5/5
GameSpot	7/10
GamesRadar+	4/5
Giant Bomb	4/5
Hardcore Gamer	4/5
IGN	8.2/10
Polygon	8/10

Plants vs. Zombies: Garden Warfare 2 received "generally favorable" reviews, according to review aggregator Metacritic.

Critics praised the new additions to the game that weren't found in the original Garden Warfare. Multiple critics enjoyed the new single player campaigns that the original didn't have, which also did a good job of introducing the 6 new character classes, although Shoemaker from GiantBomb said that they don't usually get especially elaborate and are mostly built out of modified versions of the existing multiplayer mechanics. Critics also enjoyed the goofy nature of the game compared to other shooters. Even though the game may be considered to look childish, the game mechanics are stated to be like those of the Battlefield series. The game received favorable review about the inclusion of more zombie playtime than the original, making both plants and zombies teams feel equal, but Gies from Polygon said that playing as the brain-craving Zombies just isn't quite as fun as the Plants.

Some critics disliked the microtransactions to buy in-game coins to get cosmetics for characters, but believed it wasn't bad for the game to have. Even though microtransactions can be found in the game, there are no advertisements to spend money for the game. Campbell from Electronic Gaming Monthly said that he never felt compelled to purchase any in-game currency.

The game's retail version was the second best-selling game in its week of release in the UK, debuting at number 2 in the UK retail software sales chart, behind Far Cry Primal.

== Follow-up game ==
A successor, Plants vs. Zombies: Battle for Neighborville was released in October 2019 for PlayStation 4, Windows, and Xbox One, and in March 2021 for the Nintendo Switch. The game included 9 more classes with 4 different groups: attackers, defenders, supporters and swarm.
