= Mr. Saitou =

- Developer: Laura Shigihara
- Publisher: Laura Shigihara
- Designer: Laura Shigihara
- Composers: Laura Shigihara; Toby Fox
- Engine: RPG Maker
- Platforms: Linux; macOS; Nintendo Switch; Windows
- Release: WW: March 23, 2023
- Genre: Adventure
- Mode: Single-player

Mr. Saitou is a 2023 adventure game developed by Laura Shigihara. It is set in the same world as Rakuen.

== Gameplay ==
Players control a salaryman who is hospitalized. There, he enters a fantastical alternate reality imagined by a boy and becomes a llamaworm, a combination of llama and worm. Besides a bizarre office life, he collects gemstones in a cave inhabited by various creatures. He does this by completing various puzzles.

== Plot ==
It tells the story of Mr. Saitou, a middle-aged Japanese salaryman suffering from work and daily life due to constant overtime and social isolation. One day, he gets into an accident, being hospitalized in serious condition. He meets Brandon, a boy who likes to draw a species called Llamaworms and also makes friendship bracelets. He promptly names the Llamaworm he has drawn Saitou, then draws more, naming them all Saitou, apart from the one wider than the others, which named "Widetou".

After Brandon leaves, Mr. Saitou loses consciousness and wakes up in a meeting room surrounded by co-workers and his boss with a presentation to give. Also, he and everyone else is now a Llamaworm, realized that the real world was transformed into a strange magical land imagined by Brandon. After Saitou is out of bed, he collects seven metrics for his boss before turning in these metrics and going to an after-work drinks gathering despite very much not wanting to.

The next day, Mr. Saitou wakes up to find a strange flower bud, realized the bud is Brandon, in his apartment, informs him about Minimori, as well as their larger versions Megamori and Gigamori, are gormless-looking birds that plop down wherever they like eating worms, as just for example is him. Mr. Saitou is deathly afraid of them, but Brandon helps him out to get rid of the Minimori for Saitou. Brandon is on a mission to find the Flooded Gemstone Caverns near where Mr. Saitou lives. Seeing as Mr. Saitou has already slept in and missed his presentation; he offers to help Brandon enter the caverns.

To reach the caverns, they have to help Archaeolotou to enter the final gate at the center as a quest, only must to build his Minimori café and explores the caverns with Brandon, where they can solve strange puzzles, governed by gigantic and seemingly sentient calculators on the walls of some caverns involving Sphinx of Math, and must find varying sizes of Minimori in the networks of caves, then bring them back out to sit on their corresponding stones for Archaeolotou. They encountered a friendly foot, granted permission for them to enter the Kinoko Matsuri Club by dressed up as Lil Budz. As they entered the club, it was shown inside the club is actually a concert.

After all the quest solved, the final gate is finally open, and which finds out a large room full of beautiful crystals filled inside. Brandon informs one of the people he met at his grandmother's work was the elderly Mr. Sasaki, said that he only regrets he ever had was he never biked on Lumen Rock Canyon before, only something special find at night where the stones turn brightly. They return home in the train station.

He wakes up in a real world without Brandon, Saitou asks that he stands too close to the tracks as a train approaches the station led his accident. As Saitou nearly leaves the hospital, the doctor informs one of the patients was Brandon took him all afternoon to make it and leaves with Brandon's drawing he dreamt for Saitou.

The game ends as the post-credit art shown Saitou and Brandon eating biscuits together.

== Development ==
Mr. Saitou was released for Linux, macOS, and Windows on March 23, 2023. It is included in the deluxe version of Rakuen, which was released the same day.

== Reception ==
PC Gamer called it "a bite-sized experience" compared to Rakuen but said it has "a soulful bittersweetness". RPGFan said that it "has heart and something to say", but they felt there was not enough interesting gameplay to recommend it. Rock Paper Shotgun called it "a wonderful, short RPG" that satirizes Japanese work life and identified it as one of their favorite games of 2023 as of July. Reviewing the deluxe version of Rakuen for the Switch, NintendoWorldReport said both games "deliver a delightfully charming experience".
