= Rakuen (video game) =

2017 role-playing adventure video game

- Developer: Laura Shigihara
- Publisher: Laura Shigihara
- Designer: Laura Shigihara
- Artists: Emmy Toyonaga; Matt Holmberg; Steven Davis
- Writer: Laura Shigihara
- Composer: Laura Shigihara
- Engine: RPG Maker XP (Windows); Ebitengine (Switch)
- Platforms: Microsoft Windows; OS X; Linux; Nintendo Switch
- Release: Windows, OS X, Linux: WW: May 10, 2017; Nintendo Switch: WW: March 23, 2023
- Genre: Adventure
- Mode: Single-player

Rakuen is a 2017 adventure video game, created by Laura Shigihara. It was built using the RPG Maker XP engine and released on May 10, 2017. It is a sprite-based exploration game, in which text boxes serve as the primary conduit for communication. The name "Rakuen" is translated from Japanese as "paradise." The game is currently available for Mac OS X, Linux, Windows, and Nintendo Switch.

A Nintendo Switch port, developed by Leeble Forest, was released on March 23, 2023. A direct spinoff, Mr. Saitou, was released on March 24, 2023.

== Plot ==
A boy is laid up in a hospital ward and is visited by his mother every day. The mother brings a book with her to read to him, called Rakuen. It is a story about a magical land that is inhabited by a creature that grants wishes known as the Guardian of the Forest. The mother reveals a secret to the boy that the book's world is real and they can visit it together. The boy asks his mom if they can visit the storybook world so he can ask the Guardian of the Forest to grant him one wish. In order to receive the wish, the boy must complete a set of challenges. The boy's main task is to collect pieces of music for new friends that he makes throughout the game, placing music at the center of the story. As the boy is exploring through the game he comes across an entrance to a parallel fantasy, one that is intimately connected to the real world. He meets really strange characters during his endeavor, (a grumpy onion and a pretentious rose). The boy also undertakes quests on behalf of the hospital patients and their fantasy-world avatars. Some of those quests include searching for lost items, collecting needed items, and figuring out logic puzzles while following basic instructions. The rewards earned from these quests is that your new friends achieve happiness, as in you feel rewarded for the end of their distress.

== Reception ==
Reception

Aggregate score
Aggregator	Score
Metacritic	84/100

Rakuen received "generally favorable reviews" from critics, according to review aggregator Metacritic. Critics gave the game a Metascore of 84/100.

Polygon rated the game a 9.5/10. Polygon has also ranked the game 32nd on their list of the 50 best games of 2017, citing that "The game delivers straightforward quests greatly illuminated by a range of characters whose lives represent the anxieties we all face: rejection, loneliness, guilt, fear and pride."

== Awards/recognition ==
- Rakuen received an Honorable Mention for "Excellence in Narrative" from the 2018 Independent Games Festival.
- Rock, Paper, Shotgun named it one of the Best PC games of 2017.
- GameStar rated the game an 87/100, earning a gold-award and receiving a blue star award for "Best Story."
- Polygon placed Rakuen on its "Best Games of 2017" list.
