= Plants vs. Zombies =

Video game franchise

- Genres: Tower defense game (primary); Third-person shooter; Digital collectible card game
- Developers: PopCap Seattle (2009–present); PopCap Shanghai (2011–present); PopCap Vancouver (2014–2019); Other: Tencent Games (2012–present); Talkweb Games (2013); DICE (2014–2019); EA Vancouver (2019); Motive Studio (2019); Slingshot Studio (2023–present)
- Publishers: PopCap Games (2009–2011); Electronic Arts (2011–present); Sony Online Entertainment (2011); Dorkly (2011; 2025–present); Dark Horse Comics (2013–present)
- Creator: George Fan
- Artist: Rich Werner
- Writer: Stephen Notley
- Composers: Laura Shigihara; Peter McConnell; Barry Dowsett; Becky Allen; Stan LePard
- Platforms: View: Windows; macOS; iOS; Xbox 360; PlayStation 3; Nintendo DS; DSiWare; Android; Windows Phone; PlayStation Vita; J2ME; BlackBerry Tablet OS; BlackBerry 10; Xbox One; PlayStation 4; Nintendo Switch; Nintendo Switch 2; PlayStation 5; Xbox Series X/S
- First release: Plants vs. Zombies; May 5, 2009
- Latest release: Plants vs. Zombies: Replanted; October 23, 2025

Plants vs. Zombies is a video game franchise created by George Fan. The series follows the affiliates of David "Crazy Dave" Blazing as they use his plants to defend against a zombie invasion, led by Dr. Edgar George Zomboss. The first game, Plants vs. Zombies (2009), was developed by PopCap Seattle and released by PopCap Games before being acquired by Electronic Arts (EA). After PopCap Games' acquisition, EA expanded the game into a franchise with games on many different platforms, including a comic book series written by Paul Tobin and published by Dark Horse Comics, and a web series published by Dorkly.

The series has a variety of game genres. The original game and its sequels Plants vs. Zombies Adventures, Plants vs. Zombies 2, and Plants vs. Zombies 3 are tower defense games where the player has to use plants with different abilities to defend their home against a zombie invasion. Developed by PopCap Vancouver, the spin-off Plants vs. Zombies: Garden Warfare and its sequels are third-person shooters where the player can play as either the plants or zombies in multiplayer mode (and beginning in Plants vs Zombies: Garden Warfare 2, single player matches). Plants vs. Zombies Heroes is a digital collectable card game with characters from previous installments. A remake of the original game, Plants vs. Zombies: Replanted, features upscaled graphics alongside new game-modes and features.

== History ==
Release timeline
2009	Plants vs. Zombies
2010
2011	Social Edition
2012	Great Wall Edition
2013	Endless Edition
2013	Adventures
2013	Plants vs. Zombies Comics
2013	Plants vs. Zombies 2
2013	Online
2014	Garden Warfare
2015
2016	Garden Warfare 2
2016	Heroes
2017–2018
2019	Battle for Neighborville
2020–2023
2024	Plants vs. Zombies 3
2025	Replanted

=== Main history ===
On April 1, 2009, PopCap released a music video for the song "Zombies on Your Lawn" by Laura Shigihara to promote Plants vs. Zombies, also included at the game's conclusion. A PopCap spokesperson, Garth Chouteau, revealed in an IGN interview that Plants vs. Zombies would be released soon on PC and Mac. On April 22, 2009, PopCap released an official game trailer of Plants vs. Zombies on YouTube. During the promotion of Plants vs. Zombies, PopCap released a demo version of the game that could be played for thirty minutes. Plants vs. Zombies was officially released on May 5, 2009, for PC and Mac, by 2013 switching from a $2.99 gameplay cost to free-to-play on iOS and Android devices. Critics on mobile devices give the game an average of 4.3-4.8 star ratings. From 2011 to 2014, the first game was adapted and expanded to the Chinese market as Plants vs. Zombies: Social Edition, Plants vs. Zombies: Great Wall Edition, and Plants vs. Zombies: Endless Edition. (Note: Renamed to Plants vs. Zombies: Dragon Palace Edition in 2014.)

PopCap Games and its assets were bought by EA on July 12, 2011, for 750 million US dollars. Fifty employees were laid off in the Seattle studio of PopCap Games on August 21, 2012, to mark a switch of focus to mobile and social gaming.

On August 20, 2012, PopCap announced that they were working on a sequel to Plants vs. Zombies. Its release date would be set at late spring of 2013. However, the game's status was in doubt shortly after the announcement when the company went through a period of layoffs.

In May 2013, PopCap Games released a trailer revealing a sequel to the first game, titled Plants vs. Zombies 2: It's About Time. The game was soft-launched for the iOS in Australia and New Zealand on July 10, 2013, and was officially released on August 14, 2013, as a freemium title. The game featured new locations and plants along with the addition of plant food, a power-up that can be used to enhance a plant for a short period and can either be bought using in-game currency or acquired by defeating zombies that are glowing green. There are four other power-ups in the game, all of which are bought with coins, the in-game currency. Along with these new add ons, the game continues to make updates from time to time. According to EA News, the Arena and Penny's Pursuit updates, which are different game modes within the game, have been some of their latest major updates, aside from all the mini add ons.

In July 2019, EA announced Plants vs. Zombies 3, another free-to-play mobile title in the series. It was launched in a pre-alpha state for Android in July 2019. The game soft-launched in February 2020 in the Philippines, Romania, and Ireland. It was then made unavailable in October 2020, becoming unplayable in November 2020, with EA stating they had plans to release an improved version of the game in the future. On September 7, 2021, Plants vs. Zombies 3 was soft-launched again with substantial changes, such as two-dimensional graphics and the return of the Sunflower as a plantable plant, having the same purpose in the previous iterations. On January 17, 2024, Plants vs. Zombies 3 was soft launched again, this time as Plants vs. Zombies 3: Welcome to Zomburbia in select regions, adapting storylines and characters from the Plants vs. Zombies comic book series (written by Paul Tobin, illustrated by Ron Chan, and published by Dark Horse Comics to the app Plants vs. Zombies Comics, as well as physically), including Tugboat the Zombie, Nate Timely, and Patrice Blazing. On October 7, 2025, Plants vs. Zombies 3 was soft launched again, this time as Plants vs. Zombies 3: Evolved.

In July 2025, a remake of the first Plants vs. Zombies game, titled Plants vs. Zombies: Replanted, was revealed during a Nintendo Direct presentation. It was released for PC and video game consoles on October 23, 2025.

=== Spin-offs ===
A spin-off titled Plants vs. Zombies Adventures was announced in March 2013 and was released on May 20, 2013, on Facebook. The game added new locations and new plants. It also had a gameplay feature in which the player had a limited amount of plants and had to grow more plants at an in-game farm. In July 2014, it was announced that Plants vs. Zombies Adventures would close on October 12, 2014.

Plants vs. Zombies: Garden Warfare was announced at E3 2013 as a multiplayer third-person shooter game made for PC and consoles. Plants vs. Zombies: Garden Warfare was released on February 25, 2014, in North America and on February 27, 2014, in Europe. A sequel, Plants vs. Zombies: Garden Warfare 2, was teased in June 2015 and was officially announced at E3 2015. The game was released on February 23, 2016. On March 10, 2016, PopCap announced Plants vs. Zombies Heroes, a digital collectible card game in the style of tower defense. It was soft released to certain countries on the same day, and was fully released internationally on October 18, 2016.

In August 2019, a closed beta of a sequel to Plants vs. Zombies: Garden Warfare 2 codenamed "Picnic" was made available to select players through invites. On September 4, 2019, EA announced the sequel's title; Plants vs. Zombies: Battle for Neighborville. It was released in an early access state that same date. The game was fully released on October 18, 2019.

A cancelled single player Plants vs. Zombies game had been in the works within EA from about 2015 to 2017. Known as "Project Hot Tub" in reference to Hot Tub Time Machine, the game was to have been an action game along the lines of the Uncharted series but maintaining its family-friendly nature, featuring two teenage siblings that travelled through time to fight zombies. The game was being developed by PopCap's Vancouver location. While a vertical slice of the game had been shown off to EA executives in 2017, EA opted to cancel the project to pull in more resources to Visceral Games to support their work on the Star Wars game under the name Project Ragtag, which had been languishing for several years. Despite this, EA cancelled Project Ragtag in October 2017, shutting down Visceral Games, and the former team in Vancouver was relocated across other EA studios.

== Other media ==
=== Comics ===
Since July 2013, Dark Horse Comics has published a Plants vs. Zombies ongoing comic book series, following teenagers Nate Timely and Patrice Blazing as they protect Neighborville from the zombie armies of Dr. Edgar George Zomboss, with the help of Patrice's uncle, David "Crazy Dave" Blazing, and his own legion of genetically modified sentient plants, accessible via the app Plants vs. Zombies Comics. Elements and characters from the comic book series were later adapted to the franchise's video game instalments, and vice-versa, in particular Plants vs. Zombies 3.

=== Film ===
In April 2015, a Plants vs. Zombies animated film was reported to be in development at Warner Bros., with Roy Lee attached as a producer through his production company, Vertigo Entertainment.

In April 2022, Plants vs. Zombies artist and character co-creator Rich Werner revealed that a Plants vs. Zombies animated feature film was previously pitched to DreamWorks Animation, with "a full script reading and a room full of concept art" by Peter Zaslav, with Werner listing out what the intended plot of the film had been in an interview that May.

In October 2026, test footage from a film adaptation said to have been in development by Mill Pictures around 2014, was leaked online.

=== Web series ===
In November 2011, the animation studio Dorkly began publishing a web series of animated Plants vs. Zombies shorts about the plants' personal lives on the lawn, informally known as Plants vs. Zombies vs. Dorkly. In October 2025, PopCap's parent company EA (Electronic Arts) began officially sponsoring new episodes of this web series from Dorkly to promote Plants vs. Zombies: Replanted, with the web series now considered an official entry in the franchise.

No.	Title	Original release date
1	"Plants vs. Zombies: Wall-nut Gets Bitten" "Wall-nut Begs For His Life!"	November 28, 2011
The Twin Sunflowers argue to Peashooter that Wall-nut will soon turn into a zombie on being bitten without being fully eaten, and call for Peashooter to shoot him before he fully turns.
2	"Plants vs. Zombies vs' The Last of Us' CLICKERS!!!"	January 10, 2025
The plants find themselves besieged by the clickers from The Last of Us instead of their usual batch of zombies.
3	"The Worst Strategy in Plants vs. Zombies"	January 31, 2025
The plants find themselves dealing with placement strategy issues with the guy from the house.
4	"Plants vs. Zombies vs. Five Nights at Freddy's" "Plants vs. FNaF"	March 28, 2025
Over the night shift, a tired skeleton crew of plants find themselves besieged by an animatronic moving only when unobserved while waiting for reinforcements coming in the morning.
5	"Do Zombies Have Feelings?" "The Most Dramatic Death!"	May 30, 2025
The plants observe from a distance as an emotional zombie bomb squad attempt to save a zombie from a Potato Mine.
6	"Plants vs. Zombies: Wall-nut's Monster"	October 28, 2025
Wall-nut and Peashooter host a pumpkin paint-off, before unwittingly creating monsters out of their creations.
7	"Plants vs. Zombies: The Battle of Feastivus!" "Zombie Santa"	December 25, 2025
The zombies celebrate the arrival of Zombie Santa at Feastivus, who brings them a gift of brains, before he is suddenly besieged by plants, who are saved by Crazy Dave after being overwhelmed by Zombie Santa's forces.
8	"3 New Terrible Zombies"	January 30, 2026
Dr. Zomboss unleashes three new varieties of zombie: the incredibly tall Zombius longus, the "undead zombie" (actually a living accountant named Carl), and the truly unstoppable "Zombie Karen", who Sunflower unleashes the piranha-like Veggie Burger Slider, who eats Zombie Karen before launching himself at Dr. Zomboss.
9	"Plants vs. Zombies: MORE terrible strategies"	February 27, 2026
Sunflower deals with more terrible strategies from his fellow plants, these ones courtesy of themselves.
10	"Plants vs. Zombies: If Zombies Controlled The World"	March 27, 2026
Dr. Zomboss developed a reality-warping Z-Pad, which he has his soldiers use to do things like make Peashooters shoot brains, drop a giant jalapeño on the roof, turn off the sun, and unleash monsters, before arguing amongst themselves and accidentally giving the Z-Pad to a Peashooter, who uses it to defeat the zombies and give himself a moustache.
11	"Corn-Fetti Popper vs. Zombies... But It's a Party?"	May 15, 2026
Celebrating the seventeenth anniversary of Plants vs. Zombies, Corn-Fetti Popper starts "party-o'clock" between the plants and zombies, Peashooter refusing to take part in a rap battle with the zombies before convincing Corn-Fetti Popper to take out Dr. Zomboss.
