= Colleen Coover =

American comic book artist (born 1969)

- Coover at Rose City Comic Con in 2026
- Born: Colleen Ann Coover; July 14, 1969 (age 57) Iowa, U.S.
- Areas: Cartoonist, Penciller
- Notable works: Small Favors; Banana Sunday; Bandette
- Spouse: Paul Tobin

Colleen Coover (born July 14, 1969) is a comic book artist and author based in Portland, Oregon and is known for creating the lesbian-themed erotic comic book Small Favors from Eros Comix, illustrator of the comic book limited series Banana Sunday from Oni Press, and for illustrating several short stories in X-Men: First Class from Marvel Comics.

== Early life ==
Coover was born in Iowa on July 14, 1969. She is bisexual. Coover met writer Paul Tobin at a drama class, and would go on to meet again at a local comic book store she regularly frequented. Coover and Tobin were married August 25, 2007.

Coover grew up reading comics. She dropped out of art school and says that she is entirely self-taught as a comic book artist. She began drawing comics after meeting her husband.

She credits the Hernandez brothers, Milton Caniff, Wendy Pini, Seth's Palookaville, Peter Arno, Dan DeCarlo, Curt Swan, and Neal Adams as artistic influences.

== Career ==
Coover has contributed comic work to Out magazine and has done illustration and cover design for various publications, including On Our Backs, Girlfriends, Curve, Kitchen Sink, and Nickelodeon Magazine; and for publishers including Buckle Down Publishing, Alyson Books, Cleis Press, and Dark Horse Comics.

Her first major comics project was Small Favors, a sex-positive, woman-friendly adult comic published from 2000 to 2003.

She illustrated the graphic novels Gingerbread Girl (2011) and Banana Sunday (2006), both written by Paul Tobin.

Since 2012 she has illustrated the digital comic Bandette, also written by Paul Tobin. Bandette was nominated for four Eisner Awards, and won the award for Best Digital/Webcomic in 2016. She won the Eisner Award again in 2017 for Best Digital Comic with Bandette.

Coover is a member of Periscope Studio and the Comic Art Collective.

Coover participated in the panels: "Prism Queer Press Grant Portfolio Review", "Love is in the Air: LGBT Romance Comics", and "Women of Marvel" at the San Diego Comic Convention 2009.

She is the author of the 2012 short story "Home Port."

== Bibliography ==
=== Comics ===
- The Age of The Sentry #3: "She Loved A Monster!" (2008)
- Amazing Spider-Girl #25–28
- Amazing Spider-Man Family #3–4
- Bandette #1–20 (Monkeybrain Comics and Dark Horse Comics )
- Fantastic Four Giant-Size Adventures #1: "Susan Storm and Misty Knight in: The Importance of Being Invisible" (August 2009, 9 pages)
- Girl Comics #1: "Introduction" (May 2010)
- I Am An Avenger #4: "Then And Now" (February 2011)
- Iron Man and Power Pack #4: "Dog & Pony Show" (April 2008)
- King-Size Spider-Man Summer Special #1: "Un-Enchanted Evening" (2008)
- Lockjaw and the Pet Avengers #1: "Thor Frog Origin Thingy" (July 2009)
- Models Inc #3: "Brains!" (back-up story) (December 2009)
- Power Pack: Day One #1–4: "Power Focus" (May–August 2008)
- Tails Of The Pet Avengers #1: Terrier On The High Seas (story and art) and Birds of a Different Feather (April 2010)
- Uncanny X-Men: First Class #1 (inked, joint-colored, joint-lettered)
- Thor and the Warriors Four #1-4: "The twelve labors of the babysitter!" (June–September 2010)
- Wolverine: First Class #8: "Kitty's Dream" (December 2008)
- X-Men: First Class #3, 5–6, 9, 11–15 (October 2007 - October 2008)
- X-Men: First Class Finals #1–3 (April–June 2009)
- X-Men First Class Special: "The Key; Men Fear the Blob; The Mental Might of Marvel Girl" (July 2009)

=== Books ===
- Small Favors, Volume 1 (Eros Comix, 2002) collecting issues 1-4
- Small Favors, Volume 2 (Eros Comix, 2003) collecting issues 5-8
- Banana Sunday (Oni Press, 2006) (with Paul Tobin, as "Root Nibot")
- Lockjaw and the Pet Avengers (Marvel, 2009) H/B incl. "Terrier On The High Seas" written & drawn by Colleen Coover; "Birds Of A Different Feather"
- Sentry: The Age of the Sentry (Marvel, 2009) incl. The Age of The Sentry #3: "She Loved A Monster!"
- Spider-Man: Amazing Friends Marvel, 20??) incl. "Take a Seat!"
- Spider-Man: Spider-Women Digest (Marvel, May 2009) inc. "Un-enchanted Evening" (from King-Size Spider-Man Summer Special #1)
- X-Men First Class: Mutant Mayhem (Marvel, 2008) incl. X-Men: First Class (2007) 1-5 and X-Men: First Class Special #1
- X-Men First Class: Band of Brothers (Marvel, 2008) incl. X-Men: First Class (2007) 6-10
- X-Men First Class: The Wonder Years (Marvel, 2009) incl. X-Men: First Class (2007) 11-16 and Giant-Size X-Men: First Class
- X-Men First Class: Finals (Marvel, 2009) incl. backup stories from issues 1-3: "Scott and Jean Are On a Date!", "X-Date Part 2", and "X-Date Part 3"
- Gingerbread Girl (Top Shelf, 2011) (with Paul Tobin)
- Bandette, Volume 1: Presto! (Dark Horse, 2013) (with Paul Tobin) collecting issues 1-5
- Bandette, Volume 2: Stealers Keepers! (Dark Horse, 2015) (with Paul Tobin) collecting issues 6-9
- Bandette, Volume 3: The House of the Green Mask (Dark Horse, 2016) (with Paul Tobin) collecting issues 10-13
- Small Favors: The Definitive Girly Porno Collection (Limerence Press, 2017) (reprints books 1 & 2, plus color special and new material)
- Gothic Tales of Haunted Love (Bedside Press, 2018) (contributor)
