= Pathogenic (video game) =

2026 video game

- Developer: Aberrant Labs
- Publisher: Slug Disco
- Engine: Godot
- Platforms: Windows; MacOS; Linux
- Release: July 14, 2026
- Genres: Roguelike; Twin-stick shooter; Bullet hell
- Mode: Single-player

Pathogenic is a video game developed by Aberrant Labs, and published July 14, 2026 by Slug Disco on Steam for Windows, MacOS, and Linux. The game is a roguelike top-down bullet hell twin-stick shooter in which the player controls a pathogenic microorganism, infecting a human host and traveling through procedurally generated levels resembling various internal organs and biological structures. The playable pathogen can be modified by inserting organelles into slots and arranging the organelles to create various effects.

The goal of the game is to kill the human host, portrayed in the intro as a scientist whose leg is cut by a piece of broken glass containing a live pathogen.

== Development ==
Pathogenic is Aberrant Labs' first release. The game was created by a team of two: former Google engineer Matt as the developer and composer, and Brazilian artist J. Roberto as the visual designer. Matt, who also composed music for Brotato, has said major influences for the game include Hades, Binding of Isaac, and Spore.

A demo was released on itch.io in 2025 and updated several times throughout the course of development. It runs on Godot Engine.

== Gameplay ==
An example of the editor, which enables the player to modify their pathogen's design mid-game

Pathogenic offers a tutorial for new players, which explains the controls and moves through several linear levels, each one explaining an individual gameplay concept.

The player can pause gameplay outside of combat to modify their pathogen by adding, recycling, and moving around organelles. Some organelles are weapons, while others (such as flagella) are used for propulsion, and yet others provide special abilities or effects, such as increased health or increased weapon damage, that impact connected organelles. Different combinations of organelles can have various effects, such as increases in maximum health or weapon damage. All organisms in the game are affected by soft body physics, so different spatial arrangements of organelles affect the movement of the player.

Enemies take the form of rival parasitic microorganisms, such as helminths, as well as cells of the host's immune system, such as macrophages and T cells. Defeating enemies allows the player to pick up DNA, which serve the function of experience points. After collecting enough DNA, a "mutation" is triggered, in which the player is required to select a modifier. Some mutations are referred to as "evolutions", which allow the player to choose a new form for their organism, many of which are named after real bacterial morphologies. The player can also collect "cores", which are the game's primary currency and are used to purchase items in randomly located upgrade shops. Organelles are often presented as a choice between multiple options.

The game's interface; health, DNA, and cores in the lower left, a mini-map in the upper right, and a depiction of the pathogen with the organelles highlighted in the upper left

The game's levels are procedurally generated, and the player can move from one section to another through structures reminiscent of capillaries. When moving into a new area with enemies present, the path back is blocked until all enemies are defeated, at which point the path reopens and the player can move freely or fast travel between areas. Each level features a boss which must be defeated before moving on to the next organ. Defeated bosses drop "plasmid" points, which allow for the selection of permanent upgrades for specific starter forms from a skill tree on the main menu. The goal of the game is to move through each organ to reach the heart and kill the human host, with the difficulty increasing as the player progresses up the body. The player can optionally solve puzzles to reach the brain as an additional challenge.

== Reception ==
The game has been compared to Spore for its customization mechanics, with one reviewer noting that the game "might be the best attempt yet at realising the lost potential of the cell stage". Jon Clarke from Day One gave the game a 9 out of 10, complimenting its soundtrack and gameplay, and noting that it has "some harsh difficulty spikes that can cause frustration". Aaron Zimmerman from Ars Technica compares the game to The Binding of Isaac and lauds the customization and progression mechanics, while noting the high difficulty and that randomization can make some playthroughs more challenging or less enjoyable. Mike Holmes of Rogueliker said the game has a "clean and crisp presentation" reminiscent of Kurzgesagt's health education videos.

Pathogenic sold 100,000 copies in its first week.

== See also ==
- Biology in fiction
- List of video games released in 2026
