= PC Building Simulator =

- Developers: Claudiu Kiss; The Irregular Corporation
- Publisher: The Irregular Corporation
- Engine: Unity
- Platforms: Windows, PlayStation 4, Xbox One, Nintendo Switch
- Release: January 29, 2019
- Genre: Business simulation
- Mode: Single-player

PC Building Simulator is a simulation-strategy video game produced by The Irregular Corporation and Romanian independent developer, Claudiu Kiss. The game is centered around owning and running a workshop which builds and maintains PCs, mainly gaming-oriented ones.

The game was independently developed by Kiss before it was picked up by indie publisher The Irregular Corporation in 2017. It was initially released for early access on 27 March 2018 on Steam. The game is compatible with the Windows operating system, and utilizes the OpenGL programming interface.

PC Building Simulator features real life parts from a vast array of specialized brands.

A sequel, PC Building Simulator 2, was released on the Epic Games Store on October 12, 2022.

== Gameplay ==
=== Game modes ===
The game features three modes: Career, Free Build and How to Build a PC, each requiring different play styles.

==== Career ====
In Career mode, the game puts the player in responsibility of a workshop where they must complete tasks that involve modifying pre-built computers (e.g. removing viruses, adding new parts) or building a brand new computer to earn in-game cash, which can be spent on purchasing new or used parts. After each completed task, the player earns a certain number of experience points. When a certain amount of experience is reached, the player levels up, unlocking newer and more advanced parts.

In order to acquire parts, the player must buy them from fictional online stores, which sell new or used parts. For new parts, the player can choose between different shipping services: the shorter the delivery time, the more cash the player has to pay. The game offers 3 choices: next-day delivery, the standard option which costs 30 dollars; same day delivery, which spawns the parts immediately on the loading bay, but costs 100 dollars; and a slow but cheap delivery which can take from 3 to 5 working days but costs only 10 dollars. Used parts are shipped for free, but they usually take several days or even a couple of weeks to arrive. A calendar tracks the estimated delivery date for each product bought and the deadlines for the customers' orders.

As the player progresses, they will start seeing larger sums of cash stored in their banks, which could be spent improving their workshop. Some of the upgrades include additional workbenches (needed to accomplish tasks with more efficiency) and a cabinet (used to store computers and reduce clutter).

The player starts the game with a basic computer that can keep up with all the tasks required in order to fulfill the customers' orders. As the game progresses, the player can fully customize it (or even build a new one from scratch), either for convenience or mere aesthetics. There is also an optional leaderboard that lists the best PCs built by the other players during their own career.

The player must pay the rent for the shop each month, as well as the electricity bill. Failing to do so will result in some hefty debt.

===== Inbox =====
The Inbox is where the player receives in-game messages from potential customers, and other messages ranging from discount alerts, to spam and plain scams. The player can accept or reject each request.

Potential requests include virus removal, system upgrade, system fix, overclocking, or building of an entirely new personal computer. Depending on the amount of spending required for each request, the customers often always give the player a substantial profit margin. However, after accepting an order, unfulfilled requests are automatically rejected from returning to the customer, meaning that the player cannot simply conduct cash grab by doing nothing with the PC. As the game advances, timed jobs become more common. Being unable to conduct jobs within the limit will result in the customer revoking their order, having the players waste their money by buying unnecessary parts.

==== Free Build ====
The Free Build mode is the sandbox mode of the game. The player is given unlimited money, and all the parts, work benches and tools are unlocked from the start. Players are free to play the game without the constraint of constant jobs.

==== How to Build a PC Mode ====
The game provides a detailed tutorial in order to teach a novice how to build a proper PC.

==== Esports Expansion ====
The Esports Expansion DLC features a secondary Career Mode in which the player will provide tech support to several fictional Esports teams and athletes.

Main requests, such as building, fixing, and upgrading the gaming rigs, are provided by the team manager using the regular Inbox system; athletes will also ask in-depth requests using new Smartphone mechanics.

In addition to that, the player will have to fulfill requests coming from real-life brands that will fictionally sponsor the Esports teams.

At the end of each week, there will be an e-sport match. The player will have to set up the gaming PCs on the stage and, occasionally, solve emergencies in a limited amount of time. After the match, player actions will be evaluated by the team manager, the sponsor, and the athletes according to how many requests were successfully fulfilled.

Contrary to the standard Career mode, the player will have to operate within a predetermined weekly budget; overspending will affect negatively the weekly evaluation from the team manager. The budget can be increased by completing a limited amount of non-mandatory side jobs.

=== Computer components ===
The game features many parts to be used in building or repairing computers. Most of the parts are fully licensed from various real-life brands.

There are also three fictional brands, that provide basic (cheap and low performance) parts: Mortoni, for productivity-oriented computers; Shean, for low-budget, Intel-based gaming rigs; and DFL, essentially the AMD-based counterpart for Shean.

The game includes common computer components such as:

- Cases with different aesthetic and internal layouts. Their sizes include micro, cube, mid-tower, full tower, supertower, and open frame.
- Case Fans in various sizes.
- Intel and AMD CPUs
- CPU Cooling devices, including air and liquid coolers.
- Motherboards are also available in multiple sizes: E-ATX, S-ATX, Micro-ATX, and Mini-ITX.
- Power Supplies come in ATX or SFX (small form factor) sizes. They are also divided into non-modular, semi-modular, or fully modular units.
- Storage, which affect in-game software installation speed; both hard drives and solid state drives (SATA and M.2) are available in game.
- Memory (RAM)
- Graphics Cards (GPUs) from AMD and Nvidia are also featured, with AMD CrossFire and Nvidia SLI multi GPU technologies also being supported in-game.
- Cable connectors
- Custom Water Cooling parts like Radiators, Reservoirs, CPU Blocks, Watercooled GPUs, Pipes, Connectors, and Coolant.

==== Software ====
In-game software can be installed to fulfill specific tasks requested by customers, such as removing viruses, customize the case lighting and change the desktop background. This software run in the game on a fictional operating system called OmegaOS.

The bench-marking software 3DMark is also featured in-game as a key gameplay component; similar to its real-life counterpart, it is used to benchmark the newly built or repaired machines.

=== Tools and upgrades ===
Although the overall installation process is simplified compared to real life, the player must use some tools in order to correctly install certain components. For example, installing a CPU cooler without the thermal paste will cause the PC to overheat and fail.

There are several upgrades that can ease the PC building, such as self-installing motherboard standoff screws. Said upgrades are unlocked by default in Free Build and Esports modes, but must be unlocked and bought in Career mode and are there to aid in speeding up tasks.

== Reception ==
Robert Adams of TechRaptor gave the game a 6.5/10 rating, calling the game a "a partially complete experience"; he praised the game for capturing "the experience of working as a PC repair technician about 90% correct", while noting that it lacked several "critical" features such as the lack of data preservation/recovery mechanics.
