= Plants vs. Zombies 2 =

2013 video game

- Developer: PopCap Games (Note: Talkweb Games developed the game's Chinese-only version. Tencent Games ported the original version for China.)
- Publisher: Electronic Arts
- Directors: Dan Fruchter; Jeremy Vanhoozer
- Producer: Allen Murray
- Designer: Mohan Rajagopalan
- Programmer: Terry Franguiadakis
- Artist: David Ryan Paul
- Writers: Rob McDaniel; Allen Murray; Mohan Rajagopalan
- Composers: Peter McConnell; Laura Shigihara
- Series: Plants vs. Zombies
- Engine: PopCap Framework
- Platforms: iOS; Android
- Release: iOS; August 15, 2013; Android: CHN: September 12, 2013; WW: October 2, 2013
- Genre: Tower defense
- Modes: Single-player, multiplayer

Plants vs. Zombies 2 (originally Plants vs. Zombies 2: It's About Time) is a tower defense video game developed by PopCap Games and published by Electronic Arts. It is the sequel to Plants vs. Zombies, and was released worldwide as a free-to-play game on the Apple App Store on August 15, 2013, and Google Play on October 2, 2013. The player defends the lawn from zombies by placing a variety of plants. The player must battle the zombies in different time periods, featuring Ancient Egypt, the Golden Age of Piracy, the Wild West, the 24th century, the Early Middle Ages, the 1960s, the Last Ice Age, Mesoamerica, the 1980s, the Jurassic Period, and the present.

== Gameplay ==
Plants vs. Zombies 2 is a free-to-play tower defense game where players defend the left side of the screen from hordes of zombies approaching from the right side. The player uses various plants with different abilities to combat these zombies. Some plants attack zombies directly while others are designed to slow them down, allowing the player to attack them. The game is set on a five-row grid, where the player places plants to prevent the zombies from reaching the end of each row. Plants are purchased using "sun," a currency obtained by clicking sun icons that randomly drop from the sky or are produced by certain plants, such as Sunflowers. If a zombie breaches all lines of defense, a lawn mower—or other similar, relevant object—will activate and clear the row, but if the lawn mower has already been used, and another zombie crosses, the game is over. Unlike its predecessor, Plants vs. Zombies, this installment introduces a time-travel theme. The player, alongside the character Crazy Dave and his sentient van Penny, journeys through different historical periods, including Ancient Egypt, Pirate Seas, and the Wild West, among others.

Each era introduces different plants, such as Bonk Choy and Coconut Cannon, and multiple unique zombies, such as pharaoh-suited zombies that can steal sun in Ancient Egypt. The game also adds Plant Food, a power-up that temporarily activates a plant's ability, such as Peashooters firing powerful volleys of peas or Sunflowers producing a large amount of sun at once. Plant Food can be obtained by killing special zombies or through in-game purchases. An online player versus player "Arena" mode was introduced in a later update, along with a plant leveling system which allows plants to become stronger.

== Development ==
Early concept art of Sunflower by Mark Barrett and Taylor Krahenbuhl

In August 2012, PopCap announced that they were working on a sequel to their previous game, Plants vs. Zombies, and that it would include "new features, settings, and situations". In a later announcement, the company confirmed that the new game would be released on July 18, 2013. On June 26, 2013, PopCap announced on their Twitter page that the game would release later than previously announced. On July 9, the game was released in Australia and New Zealand on the iOS App Store and came out worldwide on August 15, 2013. The Android version was released worldwide on October 23, 2013.

=== Release ===
The game was first expected to launch on iOS on July 18, 2013. On June 26, it was announced that the game was delayed until later in the summer on the game's official Twitter account. The game soft-launched in Australian and New Zealand App Stores on July 9 to test server capacity. It launched worldwide on iOS on August 15, and within 5 days it topped the free app charts in 137 countries. On September 12, PopCap Games soft-launched the game for Android in China in Baidu AppSearch and announced that it would be coming to Google Play worldwide later in the year. On October 2, the game soft-launched on the Australian and New Zealand Google Play stores.

=== Chinese version ===
Shortly after its release, a Chinese-exclusive version of Plants vs. Zombies 2 was released. It contains several plants, zombies, worlds, and game modes not present in international releases. In September 2013, Talkweb Games, who had previously operated the Chinese versions of Plants vs. Zombies, Bejeweled, and Zuma, became the operators of Plants vs. Zombies 2. An agreement between Talkweb and EA made the former the "Chinese mainland operating agency" of both Plants vs. Zombies 2 and Bejeweled Blitz. As their operator, Talkweb gains 25% of the total revenue made from both games.

In addition to the main Chinese version, a port created by Tencent was also made. The company had previously worked on Plants vs. Zombies: Great Wall Edition, a version of the first installment adapted for Chinese audiences.

== Reception ==
Reception

Aggregate score
Aggregator	Score
Metacritic	86/100

Review scores
Publication	Score
Destructoid	9/10
Edge	9/10
Eurogamer	8/10
GameSpot	8.9/10
Gamezebo	4.5/5
IGN	8.7/10
Macworld	4.5/5
TouchArcade	5/5
Wired	19/26

The game received mostly positive feedback from users and critics. Critics mostly praised the gameplay and graphics, though others criticized the game's microtransactions and lack of mechanics in later updates. It has a Metacritic score of 86/100 based on 36 reviews. PopCap Games announced at Gamescom on August 20, 2013, that the game had been downloaded 15 million times, making it the most successful EA mobile game launch. Ten days later, it was announced that the game had been downloaded 25 million times, exceeding the lifetime downloads of the first game. Apple chose Plants vs. Zombies 2 as a runner-up for the 2013 iPhone game of the year. During the 17th Annual D.I.C.E. Awards, the Academy of Interactive Arts & Sciences awarded Plants vs. Zombies 2 with both "Casual Game of the Year" and "Mobile Game of the Year". The game has garnered a modding community.
