= PC Building Simulator 2 =

2022 computer building video game

- Developer: Spiral House
- Publisher: Epic Games Publishing
- Engine: Unity
- Platform: Windows
- Release: October 12, 2022
- Genre: Business simulation
- Mode: Single-player

PC Building Simulator 2 is a simulation-strategy video game developed by Spiral House and published by Epic Games Publishing. It is the sequel to PC Building Simulator. The game was released on October 12, 2022 for Windows. It features parts based on real life components from a vast array of specialised brands that endorsed the game such as AMD, Intel and NVIDIA.

== Gameplay ==
Like the first game, the game is concentrated around owning and running a workshop which builds and maintains PCs, mainly gaming-oriented ones. The sequel expands on the original game by adding new features to the two main game modes: Career, and Free Build. PC Building Simulator 2 allows players to install apps without restarting the PC they are working on, and more in-depth PC customisation. Most of the applications that appeared on the previous game are refreshed and the general visual aesthetics of the game updated.

In the career mode, the player has moved to Uncle Tim's PC Shop in the UK after a fire. Similar to the previous game, the player starts with some beginning jobs, including performing a virus scan for the first customer. As they progress through the game, new tools and more advanced jobs become available for them.

== Development ==
The trailer of PC Building Simulator 2 was released in March 2022. An open beta for the game was available from 11-20 June. Epic Games Publishing published the game via its own Epic Games Store in October of the same year.

== Reception ==
PC Building Simulator 2

Aggregate score
Aggregator	Score
Metacritic	82/100

Review scores
Publication	Score
NME	4/5
Dexerto	8/10
Multiplayer.it	8.5/10
Sector.sk	8.5/10

PC Building Simulator 2 received "generally favorable reviews" according to review aggregator Metacritic. NME highlighted the accurate representation of PC building and repairs, but notes that players may lose interest overtime. Dexerto lauded the improvements and new features compared to its predecessor. Multiplayer.it touted the variety of hardware components and excellent simulation. Sector.sk praises the game as a well-rounded sequel, but has gripes with the monotonous and repetitive campaign.
