= Paul Tobin (author) =

American comic writer

- Paul Tobin at Rose City Comic Con in 2026
- Born: Charles City, Iowa, USA
- Occupation: Writer
- Spouse: Colleen Coover
- Writing career
- Period: 1990–present (published)
- Genre: Fantasy
- Notable works: Marvel Adventures Spider-Man (Sophia "Chat" Sanduval); Plants vs. Zombies
- Notable awards: Eisner award (2013)
- Website: paultobin.net

Paul Tobin is an American comic writer who has written regularly for Marvel Comics since 2000, and Dark Horse Comics since 2013, with his Plants vs. Zombies comic book series later being adapted as the story mode of the video game Plants vs. Zombies 3.

== Writing ==
Tobin's first major work was the comic Fringe for Caliber Comics in 1990. Since then he has written for Marvel Adventures Fantastic Four, Marvel Adventures Super Heroes, Marvel Adventures Spider-Man, and many other titles. His work often involves writing comics based on video games, including Plants vs. Zombies, The Witcher, and the Angry Birds comics. He also has written comics for Adventure Time and Prometheus, and the original Earth Boy.

In 2013, he published his debut novel Prepare To Die!, detailing a retired superhero known as Reaver returning to his hometown to reconnect with his ex-girlfriend and her sister following the death of his crime-fighting partner Paragon and a death-threat his nemesis Octagon intends to follow up on in two weeks. His 2016 novel The Genius Factor: How to Capture an Invisible Cat is the first in a five-book series of middle-grade books.

== Awards ==
Bandette, which is written by Tobin and drawn by his wife Colleen Coover, won the Eisner Award for Best Digital Comic in 2013, 2016, and 2017. The series was nominated in three Eisner Award categories in 2016: Best Continuing Series; Best Digital / Webcomic; and Best Painter / Multimedia Artist: Colleen Coover.

The graphic novel I Was the Cat, created with artist Benjamin Dewey, was also nominated for an Eisner in 2015. Bandette Volume 2: Stealers Keepers, from Dark Horse Comics, was a finalist for the Oregon Book Award for Graphic Literature in 2016.
