= Plants vs. Zombies Heroes =

2016 video game

- Developer: PopCap Games
- Publisher: Electronic Arts
- Composers: Becky Allen; Barry Dowsett
- Series: Plants vs. Zombies
- Engine: Unity
- Platforms: iOS, Android
- Release: WW: October 18, 2016
- Genre: Collectible card game
- Modes: Single-player, multiplayer

Plants vs. Zombies Heroes is a digital collectible card game and the fifth main installment in the Plants vs. Zombies series, developed by PopCap Games and published by Electronic Arts. On March 10, 2016, it underwent a soft launch in some countries on iOS, before being internationally released on October 18, 2016. Heroes is the first mobile release in the Plants vs Zombies series in which players can play on either the Plant team or the Zombie team, with the former pursuing the latter under Crazy Dave's leadership following the Hero-Tron 3000's malfunction.

== Gameplay ==
In Plants vs. Zombies Heroes, each player begins with a deck of 40 cards which they have selected beforehand, using cards from their collection. The playing area has five lanes, some of which may be elevated or aquatic. In ranked play, the rightmost lane is an aquatic lane, while the leftmost lane is elevated. A card can be placed in any empty lane (unless the card has the trait "Team Up", in which case 1 "Team Up" card can be played in the same lane as a regular card with the maximum being 2 cards per lane. Team-ups are available to plants only.). Only "Amphibious" cards can be placed in aquatic lanes. Each card has a different cost to play and as in the previous games in the series, the Plant player uses a currency of suns and the Zombies use brains. Each player and card has a certain amount of health, and will be defeated if they lose their health. There are three types of cards: Plants/Zombies, tricks, and environments. Cards may also have traits. These allow them to have special abilities, such as damaging multiple enemies, healing, being immune to tricks, etc. Each round consists of four phases: Zombies Play (zombies are played), Plants Play (plants, plant tricks, and plant environments are played), Zombie Tricks (zombie environments and tricks are played), and Fight. When one of the players' life reaches 0, the opposing player wins. Both the plants and the zombies have 11 playable heroes, each with their own unique characteristics, some of them were originally seen in past games. Various quests, rewards and challenges are available which allow the player to earn in-game currency that enables obtaining more cards for their collection. In-app purchases are available as well.

While the game may appear similar to Hearthstone, it has features that make it distinct. The first of these is the comic book style art design which along with the soundtrack game creates a very different atmosphere than the one found in Hearthstone. Most Plants and Zombies can only attack enemies in their lane. Heroes have a "block meter" used to block attacks. When the "block meter" is filled, the damage to the hero is ignored and the player gains a superpower card into their hand. The "block meter" can be filled up to 3 times. In addition, the in-game currencies can be earned more easily and faster than in Hearthstone. By watching advertisements or completing quests, users can unlock packs at a higher rate than they would have been able to in Hearthstone.

=== Card set ===
Card set releases by their name, type, date of release, and card count.
Set name	Release Date	Total Cards	Plants	Zombies
Premium	March 10, 2016	190	95	95
Galactic Gardens	June 8, 2017	100	50	50
Colossal Fossils	October 9, 2017	50	25	25
Triassic Triumph	January 30, 2018	50	25	25

Other than the cards from these sets, there are superpower cards, basic cards, and event cards.

Superpower cards are based on the chosen hero. Each hero has at least one unique legendary superpower card along with three others. Superpowers are not a part of the primary deck. During a match, each player is given a random superpower (of the hero's four) after selecting their four starting cards. The three remaining superpower cards are gained one at a time after the block meter is filled. Some cards allow the player to earn additional superpowers during a match.

The block meter has eight bars, and when the hero is hurt, it progresses by one, two, or three tiles randomly, except when the attacking unit has the trait "Bullseye", in which case the meter does not progress.

Basic cards are given once a character class is unlocked.

Players can gain event cards from weekly events. Finishing daily challenges and winning matches earns tickets, and earning enough earns a copy of event cards. Every four hours there is a bonus that multiplies the amount of tickets earned from winning as either a hero leading 2 targeted classes or one leading only one of them. The bonus can be 5 or 10 times the default amount, depending on the amount of targeted classes that the chosen hero leads; by default online matches earn 15 tickets and offline matches against the computer earn 10. Currently, there are 31 plant event cards and 32 zombie event cards.

== Reception ==
Reception

Aggregate score
Aggregator	Score
Metacritic	86/100

Plants vs. Zombies Heroes was released to positive reviews from critics, garnering a rating of "generally favorable" on the review aggregator website Metacritic.
