= Laura Shigihara =

American video game composer

- Born: United States
- Genres: J-pop, indie pop, classical, instrumental hip hop, soundtrack
- Occupations: Singer-songwriter; composer
- Instruments: Digital audio workstation; vocals; piano
- Website: laurashigihara.com

Laura Shigihara (Japanese: 鴫原 ローラ, Hepburn: Shigihara Rōra) is an American singer-songwriter, composer, video game developer, and Twitch streamer. She is best known as the lead composer and sound designer for the tower defense game Plants vs. Zombies and the creator of the acclaimed indie RPG Rakuen.

Shigihara has worked on over 30 other published video game titles including Deltarune, World of Warcraft, To the Moon, defunct mobile game High School Story and the 5th Anniversary Edition of Super Meat Boy. She co-created the ending theme song for Minecraft: The Story of Mojang with C418 and worked together with Yasunori Mitsuda on the official Square Enix Chrono Trigger/Chrono Cross 20th Anniversary Album.

== Early life ==
Born in the United States to a Japanese father and a French American mother, Shigihara grew up in both the US and Japan. She was classically trained on the piano for 11 years and taught herself guitar and drums. While studying International Relations, Business and Computer Science at the University of California, Berkeley, she was given an old version of Sonar (known as Cakewalk since 2018) which she used to start learning about mixing, arranging and production by recreating old video game soundtracks and composing her own songs. After a friend leaked her original material to record companies in Japan, Shigihara was offered record contracts as a singer there, but ended up turning them down for personal reasons.

== Career ==
Shortly after returning to the U.S., Shigihara took a job as the sound director for a company that produced an audio talk show and English learning materials through Apple Japan. She also released a studio album and composed her first video game soundtrack for a small casual game called Wobbly Bobbly. She stated that she would work voluntarily, and soon the company liked her work and paid her to create music for several subsequent projects. From there she built up her portfolio and has worked on over 30 published titles including Plants vs. Zombies, Deltarune, World of Warcraft, Minecraft, and the indie RPG To the Moon. She participated in Akira Yamaoka's charity album Play for Japan where she contributed an original song called "Jump", alongside other composers like Nobuo Uematsu, Koji Kondo and Yasunori Mitsuda. On November 16, 2011, she released her single "Cube Land" in relation to Minecraft and Plants vs. Zombies.

As a game developer herself, Shigihara published two adventure games: Rakuen in 2017 and Mr. Saitou in 2023.

== Personal life ==
She is an online streamer under the nickname supershigi on Twitch.

== Discography ==
=== Studio albums ===
Year	Title	Notes
2004	My Blue Dream +	Debut album
2021	Shigi Lofi, Vol. 1	Remix album

=== Singles ===
Year	Title	Notes
2010	"Blood Elf Druids"	World of Warcraft
2011	"Celestial Beings"	Celestial Mechanica
2011	"Cube Land"	Minecraft
2011	"Everything's Alright"	To the Moon
2012	"From the Ground Up"	Minecraft
2016	"Better Days"	A Quiver of Crows
2017	"Searching My Life"	Rakuen
2017	"Wish My Life Away"	Finding Paradise
2019	"Pirate Seas"	Plants vs. Zombies 2
2020	"Adamas Nivis"	Original song
2020	"Kingyo Hanabi"	Cover
2021	"Much Wow, So Space"	Original song
2021	"Electric Disco Shiba"	Original song
2021	"Work Hard, Play Hard"	CS:GO Music Kit
2023	"Wishing Star"	Meg's Monster
2024	"When You Wake Up"	Original song
2026	"Colony VI"	Original Song

=== Soundtrack albums ===
Year	Title	Notes
2009	Melolune	Original Soundtrack, Part 1
2010	Plants vs. Zombies	Original Soundtrack
2015	Super Sweet Boy	EP / Music from Super Meat Boy 5th Anniversary
2017	Rakuen	Original Soundtrack
2020	Dunk Lords	Original Soundtrack
2023	Mr. Saitou	Original Soundtrack

Shigihara's works also include:

- Deltarune (Toby Fox/2018), arranged/performed "Don't Forget" and "Until Next Time"
- Farmer in the Sky, director, writer, composer
- Band Saga (Rekcahdam, Playism/2016), singer
- Plants vs. Zombies 2 (PopCap Games/2013), composed "Ancient Egypt" tracks
- Cosmic Star Heroine (Zeboyd Games/2016), singer/lyricist "Lauren’s Song"
- Chrono Trigger & Chrono Cross Arrangement Album/Harukanaru Toki no Kanata e (Japanese: クロノ・トリガー&クロノ・クロス アレンジアルバム ハルカナルトキノカナタヘ, romanized: Kurono Torigā & Kurono Kurosu Arenji Arubamu/Harukanaru Toki no Kanata e) (Yasunori Mitsuda/2015), contributing Lyricist/Arranger/Singer
- CHUNITHM (Sega/2015), Sung "Alma" by Yasunori Mitsuda
- Penny Arcade's "On the Rain-Slick Precipice of Darkness 4" (2013), voice of MistleToe
- Minecraft: The Story of Mojang, co-created ending theme song Tsuki No Koibumi (月の恋文; "The Moon's Love Letter")
- Aether (The Basement Collection) (Edmund McMillen, Tyler Glaiel/2012), original song
- Theme Park (Electronic Arts/2011), lead composer
- Ghost Harvest (Electronic Arts, 8lb Gorilla/2011), composer
- Sweet World (Kabam/2010), lead composer and sound designer
- Minesweeper (Microsoft, TG Xbox 360/2009 TBA), lead composer
- Quintessence: The Blighted Venom (Kan Gao/2009 TBA), ending theme lead vocalist
- Domino Master (Microsoft, TG Xbox 360/2008), assistant sound designer
- U.S.G. A New Beginning (GPTouch/2008), ending theme composer and lead vocalist
- Interpol 2: Most Wanted (Big Fish Games, Tikgames/2008), contributing composer
- Waterscape Solitaire: American Falls (Tikgames/2007), lead composer and sound designer
- Interpol: The Trail of Dr. Chaos (Big Fish Games, Xbox 360, Tikgames/2007-2008), lead composer and sound designer
- Mahjong Tales: Ancient Wisdom (Big Fish Games, Tikgames/2007), lead composer and sound designer
- Flowershop: Big City Break (Big Fish Games, Tikgames/2006), lead composer and sound designer
- Wobbly Bobbly (Tikgames/2006), lead composer
