= Plants vs. Zombies: Garden Warfare =

2014 video game

- Cover art featuring the eight playable classes
- Developer: PopCap Vancouver
- Publisher: Electronic Arts
- Director: Justin Wiebe
- Producer: Brian Lindley
- Programmer: Greg D'Esposito
- Artists: Caroline Ancessi; Clint Jorgenson
- Composer: Peter McConnell
- Series: Plants vs. Zombies
- Engine: Frostbite 3
- Platforms: Xbox 360; Xbox One; Windows; PlayStation 3 (Note: Playable until April 28, 2026.); PlayStation 4
- Release: February 25, 2014: Xbox 360 & Xbox One; NA: February 25, 2014; AU: February 27, 2014; EU: February 28, 2014 Windows; NA: June 24, 2014; EU: June 27, 2014 PlayStation 3 & PlayStation 4; NA: August 19, 2014; AU: August 21, 2014; EU: August 22, 2014
- Genre: Third-person shooter
- Mode: Multiplayer

Plants vs. Zombies: Garden Warfare (commonly abbreviated as PVZGW or GW1) is a 2014 third-person shooter video game developed by PopCap Vancouver and published by Electronic Arts. The third game in the Plants vs. Zombies franchise but the first for consoles, the basic premise revolves around plants defending humankind from a zombie invasion. In the game, players assume control of either the Plants (under Crazy Dave) or the Zombies (under Dr. Zomboss), as they fight in various cooperative and competitive multiplayer modes. Upon completing matches and finishing objectives, players earn coins to acquire stickers that unlock customization items and character variants.

PopCap Games began the development of Garden Warfare in early 2012. They decided to let go of the series' tower defense roots and use the game to introduce the franchise to a broader audience. The team was inspired by other team-based shooters with colorful visuals such as Team Fortress 2, while the title of the game was inspired by and parodies that of Call of Duty 4: Modern Warfare. They faced different challenges when designing the game's eight classes. The game is powered by the Frostbite 3 engine, and the team collaborated closely with Frostbite's developer DICE when implementing its technology.

The game was revealed at E3 2013, and released in February 2014 as a budget title for Xbox 360 and Xbox One, followed by versions for Windows, PlayStation 3, and PlayStation 4 later in the year. The game received a generally positive reception from critics, with praise directed at its playful tone, art, combat, and character designs. The game's progression, lack of originality, and lack of content were criticized. The game was supported by several pieces of free downloadable content upon its release. By November 2015, more than eight million players had played the game. A sequel, Plants vs. Zombies: Garden Warfare 2, was released in February 2016.

== Gameplay ==
The Plants can place stationary defensive plants on flower pots, which provided combat support.

Garden Warfare is a team-based third-person shooter where players take control of the Plants or the Zombies in either a cooperative or competitive multiplayer environment. The game features eight classes, four for either faction. The Peashooter and the Foot Soldier act as general ground characters; the Sunflower, Scientist, and Engineer act as support characters; the Chomper and the All-Star are characters that engage in close-up combat, and the Cacti are snipers. In addition to normal third-person shooting, each class has three special abilities. For instance, the Peashooters can deploy a Chili Bean Bomb to launch an area of effect attack, while the Chomper can burrow underground and ambush a zombie from below and eat them As an added compliment to combat, most maps have scattered "Flower Pots" and "Bone Piles"; from these, the Plants can place stationary defensive plants while the Zombies can spawn lesser undead that roam the map on their own. This adds a player versus environment element to most game modes, which are otherwise player-versus-player. These units are controlled by artificial intelligence (AI) and are consumed upon use. Players earn coins, a form of currency in the game, by completing objectives, reviving teammates or killing enemies.

To progress in the game, players must complete unique challenges to each class. Once completed, these challenges level up the player character, allowing access to upgrades, new character variants, or cosmetic items. In-game items such as character outfits and accessories, weapon upgrades, and spawnable units are obtained from sticker packs. These packs are bought using coins from an in-game shop that contains random items. There are multiple packs available, such as cheap ones that contain only AI units, or more expensive ones that contain items of greater rarity. As for unlocking character variants, once a player has collected five stickers to make a completed picture of the variant in question, it is unlocked for use. In a post-launch update, PopCap introduced microtransactions, which enable players to unlock sticker packs using real-life currency. Variants have different weapons, stats, or an elemental effects compared to their base version. For example, Commando Pea, a variant of Peashooter, uses a fully automatic weapon but cannot deal splash damage, while Cricket Star can inflict additional fire damage to enemies. All unlocked items can be viewed in a sticker book.

=== Gameplay modes ===
The game features a cooperative mode and several competitive multiplayer modes. Garden Ops has up to four players take control the Plants and defend a garden against ten waves of zombie, with Waves 5 and 10 being boss waves in which a slot machine is spun and either spawns different boss characters or reward players with coins. After the last wave, the plants must run to a landing zone and survive until they are evacuated by Crazy Dave. In Boss Mode, player can take the role of Dr. Zomboss or Crazy Dave (for the Zombies and Plants, respectively) who circle high above the battlefield in a flying contraption and send support to players in the ground by activating radar scans, healing, resurrecting fallen teammates and launching air strikes. This mode is available for Xbox SmartGlass and Kinect users. PlayStation 4 and Xbox One players also have access to a split screen cooperative mode, in which two players engage in combat against endless waves of zombies.

Up to 24 players can compete with each other in various multiplayer modes. Team Vanquish is a team deathmatch variant which ends when one of the two teams knock out 50 opponents. In Gardens and Graveyards, players either capture (as the Zombies) or defend (as the Plants) various objectives in an expanding map. The last objective on the map is unique for each map. Suburbination (released as part of the Suburbination Pack free DLC) is a classic back and forth zone capture game mode in which teams must compete for control of three different zones, with each zone held granting the team points based on how long the zone is held. Securing all three zones at once will trigger "Suburbination", where point production is greatly increased and players on the team with suburbination active are granted additional coin bonuses. The first team to reach 100 suburbination points wins the game. There is also Gnome Bomb, (released as part of the Garden Variety Pack free DLC), in which both factions attempt to take a respawning objective, the Gnome Bomb, to the opposition camp's base and then detonate it, and Taco Bandits, (released as part of the Legends of the Lawn free DLC) where the Zombies attempt to steal three tacos from Crazy Dave's taco stand and deliver them to Dr Zomboss' mothership tractor beam, while the Plants attempt to defend the tacos at all costs. The game mode Welcome Mat pits newcomers to the game against each other, serving as a mode for them to learn the game's controls and systems. Each consecutive death in Welcome Mat after three deaths in a row will cause the player to spawn with increased health.

== Development ==
Garden Warfare had its roots in an internal gameplay concept produced by a team at publisher Electronic Arts. Believing the concept would work well as a Plants vs. Zombies game, the team produced a prototype. Once their prototype was finished, PopCap Games of Vancouver, Canada, incorporated the team into its own structure and commenced development in early 2012. The development team hoped to use Garden Warfare to introduce the franchise to a broader audience. They avoided making a 2D tower defense game and opted instead for a different genre. The game's original premise was to have the plants and the zombies fighting each other. The team came up with different gameplay possibilities such as making an open world or a single-player action game. Ultimately, the team decided to make it a multiplayer-focused game because the randomness of a multiplayer—playing with friends or strangers—made the title a great deal of fun to play. The team recruited employees who had worked on other shooters and action games, and those who had worked extensively with the Frostbite engine. They also collaborated closely with DICE when they were iterating the game's technology.

The game's target audience were players who liked action games and fans of Plants vs. Zombies. The game's tone was not as serious and grim as other shooters such as Call of Duty and Battlefield. This enabled players to simply "sit down, enjoy the game, and laugh out loud" because of its light-heartedness. The team ensured that teamwork, balanced character gameplay and skills are important pillars in the game's gameplay, similar to traditional action games. To introduce tactical depth to the game while maintaining a sense of playfulness, the team took inspirations from other team-based shooters with colorful visuals such as Team Fortress 2. To make the game more tactical, the team allowed players to spawn stationary plants and zombies, which help assist combat. Another way to add tactical depth was the introduction of character variants. Each of them has unique statistics that slightly alter the gameplay experience.

When choosing the playable plants from the roster of characters from the Plants vs. Zombies franchises, the team opted for characters that are projectile-based, which include the Peashooter and the Cactus. Characters were "cool" and "humorous", so players would want to unlock them. Other characters that have appeared in previous Plants vs. Zombies games returned as the artificial intelligence-controlled potted plants or zombies. As for the gameplay aspect, the plants were defensive characters, while zombies had more offensive skills and abilities. The team faced more challenges designing the zombies than plants as all the plants easily fit into different gameplay archetypes whereas the zombies are more one-dimensional in the original game. The team had to create a diverse cast of characters to accommodate different gameplay classes. The team also faced challenges when creating the plants' sounds; these were "abstract" to create when compared to their on-screen actions.

== Release ==
Electronic Arts officially revealed the game at Electronic Entertainment Expo 2013. The game's was initially built for Windows and Xbox 360, though it became a limited time Xbox One exclusive in partnership with Microsoft Studios. PopCap called the transition from Xbox 360 to Xbox One a "natural migration" since the development team was unprepared to launch the game on multiple platforms due to the team's small size. Initially set to be released as a budget title in mid-February 2014, the game was delayed by one week to February 25 in the US and February 27 in Europe. The Windows version was released in June 2014 through EA's distribution platform Origin. A Digital Deluxe edition, which included bonus in-game items, was also sold. The game was released for PlayStation 3 and PlayStation 4 in August 2014. These versions feature remote play with PlayStation Vita as well as costumes based on Sony's characters including Ratchet, Clank, Sly Cooper and Fat Princess. The game became part of EA Access, EA's subscription service on the Xbox One, in October 2014.

While PopCap revealed that microtransactions would not be available when the game launched; this function was added to the game in April 2014. By spending real-world money, players gain more coins, the in-game currency. The company also supported the game after the title's launch by releasing several pieces of free downloadable content, including the following:

- Garden Variety Pack: The Garden Variety pack featured the introduction of Gnome Bomb, the addition of a new map, new character upgrades, and customization options. It was released worldwide on March 8, 2014.
- Zomboss Down Pack: The Zomboss Down pack featured the introduction of the Cactus Canyon map for Gardens and Graveyards, new character variants, increased level cap for every class and new customization options. It was released on April 16, 2014.
- Tactical Taco Party Pack: The Tactical Taco Party Pack featured the introduction of the Jewel Junction map, the new Vanquish Confirmed game mode, a new 8v8 playlist for Mixed Mode. It also included two playable character variants, namely the Berry Shooter and the Citrus Cactus, both were sponsored by Aquafina FlavorSplash. The pack was released on July 1, 2014.
- Suburbination Pack: The Suburbination Pack featured the introduction of the Crash Course map, the new Suburbination game mode, new boss characters, and challenges for Garden Ops, blinged-out customization packs for all characters, and the new 'Plasma Pea' character, designed by the winner of a community competition. It was released on August 12, 2014.
- Cheetos Pack: The Cheetos Pack, available with specially marked Cheetos bags in U.S. Target stores, featured the introduction of two new character variants, the 'Chester Chomper' and the 'Dr. Chester', based on the Cheetos mascot, Chester Cheetah. This content soon became available for everyone to redeem in the form of 2 free sticker packs, 1 for each variant.
- Legends of the Lawn Pack: The Legends of the Lawn Pack featured seven new character variants, including the Centurion and the Jade Cactus, new customization sets and AI consumables, new Garden Ops waves, and the Taco Bandits game mode; also includes the Suburbination Pack for PlayStation consoles. It was released on September 30, 2014.

On February 28, 2026, Electronic Arts had announced on their Online Services Shutdown web page that online services for the PlayStation 3 version of Garden Warfare would be shut down on April 28, 2026, rendering the PS3 version of the game unplayable as a result.

== Reception ==
Reception

Aggregate score
Aggregator	Score
Metacritic	(PC) 78/100 (XONE) 76/100 (PS4) 75/100 (X360) 69/100

Review scores
Publication	Score
Eurogamer	8/10
Game Informer	6.5/10
GameSpot	7.0/10
GamesRadar+	3.5/5
IGN	7.8/10
Joystiq	4/5
Polygon	8.5/10

Garden Warfare received a generally positive reception. Critics felt that the game was a polished shooter with charm and humor, and its playful tone was among its biggest strengths. Some critics felt that it had successfully converted Plants vs. Zombies to a new and broader audience with the genre shift, and recognized PopCap for creating a moderately successful shooter in their first attempt. Reviewers praised PopCap for not fleshing out the franchise's silly premise of plants defending zombies. Many reviewers criticized the small number of multiplayer maps and modes, with Carolyn Petit of GameSpot saying that the content was thin even for a budget title. The gameplay was praised for being functional, mechanically solid and precise, with Gies noting the heritage it shared with DICE's Battlefield series.

Critics had a divisive opinion regarding the game's modes. Critics commented that they were polished and functional, but generally lacked innovation and creativity. The Garden Ops cooperative multiplayer mode was described by Hollander Cooper from GamesRadar as a clone of Gears of War's horde mode by Cooper, though he thought the concept translated well into the franchise. Petit agreed, writing that she felt that it resembled the tower defense root of the series. However, she commented that the mode was less exciting when compared with the competitive multiplayer modes since players are only fighting enemies controlled by AI. Jon Denton from Eurogamer regarded Garden Ops an introduction to the game's systems and felt that the mode was not substantial. The two competitive multiplayer modes also received a generally mixed opinion from critics. Brian Albert from IGN called the modes "standard", and Jeff Marchiafava from Game Informer felt that most of the modes were uninspired and lacked originality. However, critics appreciated the Gardens & Graveyard mode for its final stages. Albert felt that the final stage assault objectives added difficulty. Denton applauded it for being innovative and its requirement for teamwork and player coordination, while Cooper singled out its massive scale as one of its strengths. Joystiq's Mike Wehner was disappointed by the Boss Mode, which did not enhance the game's experience due to its minimal impact.

Cooper praised the player's ability to plant potted plants and the asymmetry of gameplay classes, though he and Wehner noted that there were some balance issues with some classes being too underpowered and weak. Albert disagreed, adding that none of the classes had particular gameplay advantages. The sticker packs were praised for introducing unpredictability to the game's upgrade mechanics and some critics felt that acquiring different customization options could effectively retain players. though some critics disliked its randomness, saying that it was frustrating as the upgrades are not class-specific, meaning that grinding was needed to acquire the desired upgrades. Marchiafava felt that the randomness of the sticker packs fundamentally hurt the game. Challenges were also criticized by Marchiafava as he felt they were difficult to complete, making progression very slow. The character design was praised. Albert believed that they brought about "enjoyable silliness", and Wehner wrote that the characters could "elicit a giggle".

=== Sales ===
Garden Warfare was the fourth best-selling retail game in the UK in its week of release according to Chart-Track, behind only Thief, The Lego Movie Videogame and FIFA 14. The team secured the fourth position again when the game was launched for the PlayStation systems. The release of the game on PlayStation platforms also made it the eighth best-selling retail game in August 2014 according to NPD Group. As of November 2015, eight million players had played the game since its release.

== Sequel ==
A sequel, Plants vs. Zombies: Garden Warfare 2, was revealed at the Microsoft E3 Press Conference and released on February 23, 2016, for PlayStation 4, Windows, and Xbox One. A comic series, written by Paul Tobin and drawn by Jacob Chabot, was released by Dark Horse Comics on October 28, 2015; it takes place between Garden Warfare and Garden Warfare 2. A third game, Plants vs. Zombies: Battle for Neighborville was released in October 2019 for PlayStation 4, Windows, and Xbox One, and in March 2021 for the Nintendo Switch.
