= Plants vs. Zombies: Battle for Neighborville =

2019 third-person shooter video game

Plants vs Zombies: Battle for Neighborville
- Developer: PopCap Vancouver (Note: Additional work by EA Vancouver and Motive Studios. QLOC developed the Nintendo Switch version.)
- Publisher: Electronic Arts
- Directors: Robert Davidson; Justin Wiebe
- Producers: Melvin Teo; Andrew Deneault
- Designers: Dylan Loney; Jeff Shaw; Mario Sanchez
- Programmer: Gregory D'Esposito
- Artists: Sebastien Linage; Sean McMurchy; Emerson Oaks
- Writer: Amanda Oiron
- Series: Plants vs. Zombies
- Engine: Frostbite 3
- Platforms: PlayStation 4 Windows; Xbox One; Nintendo Switch
- Release: PlayStation 4, Windows, Xbox One October 18, 2019; Nintendo Switch March 19, 2021
- Genre: Third-person shooter
- Modes: Single-player, multiplayer

Plants vs. Zombies: Battle for Neighborville is a third-person shooter video game developed by PopCap Vancouver and published by Electronic Arts. It was originally released for PlayStation 4, Windows, Xbox One in October 2019, with a Nintendo Switch version releasing in March 2021. It is a continuation of the Plants vs. Zombies: Garden Warfare spin-off series of Plants vs. Zombies, being the third overall installment. The game was released as an early access title in September 2019 before its full release in October the same year. It received generally positive reviews upon release. Plants vs. Zombies: Battle for Neighborville is the last PopCap Vancouver game before its closure in 2021.

== Gameplay ==
Similar to its predecessors, the game is a third-person shooter where players take control of the Plants (under Crazy Dave) or the Zombies (under Dr. Zomboss) in either a cooperative or competitive multiplayer environment. The game features 23 customizable gameplay classes, nine of which are new to the franchise. They are classified into four groups: attackers, defenders, supporters or swarm. Each team also has a new team play class that allows players of the same class to combine forms when they fight against enemies. Players can compete against each other in various competitive multiplayer modes, including the objective-based Turf Takeover mode and the team deathmatch variant Team Vanquish and many more. The game also features several player-versus-environment open zones which allow players to explore, find collectibles, and complete quests. Split-screen local multiplayer is also available for all gameplay modes.

== Development ==
Publisher Electronic Arts confirmed the development of a new Plants vs. Zombies shooter game in May 2019. An alpha testing for the game, which was codenamed "Picnic", was held in early August. The game was officially announced and released as an early-access game on September 4, 2019. Players who purchased the Founder's Edition would receive regular content updates until the game's full launch on October 18, 2019, and exclusive cosmetic items every week until the game's official release.

Battle for Neighborville received its last game update on September 29, 2020.

On February 17, 2021, it was announced that the game would be released on Nintendo Switch on March 19, 2021, during the Nintendo Direct. The version, subtitled Complete Edition, has no microtransactions with all content able to be acquired for free, has motion controls and can be played offline.

== Reception ==
Reception

Aggregate score
Aggregator	Score
Metacritic	PC: 77/100; PS4: 77/100; XONE: 76/100; NS: 74/100

Review scores
Publication	Score
Computer Games Magazine	7/10
Destructoid	7.5/10
Game Informer	7.75/10
GameRevolution	6/10
IGN	7.4/10
Nintendo Life	7/10
Nintendo World Report	7.5/10
Push Square	8/10
Shacknews	9/10

On review aggregation website, Metacritic, the Xbox One version of the game has a score of 76/100, and 77/100 from both the PS4 and PC versions, indicating "generally favorable reviews".

Plants vs. Zombies: Battle for Neighborville was given positive reviews. Destructoid gave the game on PS4 a 7.5/10 said about the game as "Battle for Neighborville doesn't go out of its way to surpass expectations, but it's a silly, strange, joyful game – one I'm glad was greenlit." GameRevolution gave the PC version 3/5 stars and said "Unfortunately, aside from its more robust [Plants vs. Zombies] offering and unique new characters, most of the other changes that have been made in Plants vs Zombies: Battle for Neighborville haven't been for the better."
