= Index of Windows games (L) =

This is an index of Microsoft Windows games.

This list has been split into multiple pages. Please use the Table of Contents to browse it.

Title	Released	Developer	Publisher
L.A. Noire	2011	Team Bondi, Rockstar Leeds	Rockstar Games
L.A. Rush	2005	Midway Games	Midway Games
L.A. Street Racing	2006	Invictus Games	Groove Media Inc.
La Tale	2006	Actoz Soft	Actoz Soft, Shanda, OGPlanet, Aeria Games
La Terre	2003	Microids	Microids
La-Mulana	2005	GR3 Project	
The Labyrinth of Time	2004	Wyrmkeep Entertainment Co.	Wyrmkeep Entertainment Co.
Lamplight City	2018	Grundislav Games	Application Systems
Land of the Dead: Road to Fiddler's Green	2005	Brainbox Games	Groove Games
Lander	1999	Psygnosis	Psygnosis
Lands of Lore III	1999	Westwood Studios	Electronic Arts
Lands of Lore: Guardians of Destiny	1997	Westwood Studios	Virgin Interactive
Langrisser II	1998	Masaya Games	NCS
Laser Arena	2000	Trainwreck Studios	ValuSoft
Laser Squad Nemesis	2002	Codo Technologies	Got Game, Merscom
LaserTank	1995	JEK Software	JEK Software
Last Bronx	1996	Sega-AM3	Sega
Last Call	2000	Culter Creative	Simon & Schuster Interactive
Last Epoch	2024	Eleventh Hour Games	Eleventh Hour Games
The Last Express	1997	Smoking Car Productions	Broderbund, Interplay
The Last Hero of Nostalgaia	2022	Over the Moon	Coatsink
The Last of Us Part I	2023	Naughty Dog, Iron Galaxy	Sony Interactive Entertainment
The Last of Us Part II	2025	Naughty Dog, Iron Galaxy, Nixxes Software	Sony Interactive Entertainment
The Last Oricru	2022	GoldKnights	Prime Matter
The Last Remnant	2008	Square Enix	Square Enix
Last Year: The Nightmare	2019	Elastic Games	Elastic Games
Law & Order: Dead on the Money	2002	Legacy Interactive	Legacy Interactive
Law & Order: Double or Nothing	2003	Legacy Interactive	Vivendi Universal
Layers of Fear	2016	Bloober Team	Aspyr
Layers of Fear	2023	Bloober Team	Bloober Team
Layers of Fear 2	2019	Bloober Team	Gun Interactive
Le Mans 24 Hours	2000	Infogrames Melbourne House, Torus Games	Infogrames
Leadfoot	2001	Ratbag Games	Ratbag Games
League of Legends	2009	Riot Games	Riot Games, Tencent Inc.
Left 4 Dead	2008	Valve	Valve
Left 4 Dead 2	2009	Valve	Valve
Left Behind: Eternal Forces	2006	Left Behind Games	Left Behind Games
Legacy of Kain: Defiance	2003	Crystal Dynamics	Eidos Interactive
Legacy of Kain: Soul Reaver	1999	Crystal Dynamics	Eidos Interactive
Legacy of Lunatic Kingdom	2015	Team Shanghai Alice	Team Shanghai Alice
Legal Crime	1997	Byte Enchanters	Byte Enchanters
Legend of Grimrock	2012	Almost Human	Almost Human
Legend of Grimrock II	2014	Almost Human	Almost Human
The Legend of Heroes V: A Cagesong of the Ocean	1999	Nihon Falcom Corporation	Namco Bandai Games
The Legend of Heroes: Trails of Cold Steel II	2014	Nihon Falcom	Nihon Falcom, Xseed Games
The Legend of Mir 2	2001	WeMade Entertainment	Actoz Soft
The Legend of Sword and Fairy	1997	Softstar Entertainment Inc.	Softstar Entertainment Inc.
The Legend of Sword and Fairy 4	2007	Softstar Technology (Shanghai) Co., Ltd.	Softstar Entertainment Inc.
Legendary	2008	Spark Unlimited	Gamecock Media Group, Atari SA
Legends of Eisenwald	2015	Aterdux Entertainment	Aterdux Entertainment
Legends of Might and Magic	2001	New World Computing	3DO
Legion Arena	2005	Slitherine Strategies	Strategy First
Lego Alpha Team	2000	Digital Domain	Lego Media
Lego Chess	1998	Krisalis Software Ltd.	Lego Media
Lego City Undercover	2017	TT Fusion	Warner Bros. Interactive Entertainment
Lego Creator	1998	THQR Inc., Superscape	Lego Media
Lego Creator: Knights' Kingdom	2000	THQR Inc., Superscape	Lego Software
Lego Indiana Jones 2: The Adventure Continues	2009	Traveller's Tales	LucasArts
Lego Indiana Jones: The Original Adventures	2008	Traveller's Tales	LucasArts
Lego Island	1997	Mindscape	Mindscape
Lego Island 2: The Brickster's Revenge	2001	Silicon Dreams Studio	Lego Software
Lego Loco	1998	Intelligent Games	Lego Media
Lego Marvel Super Heroes 2	2017	TT Games	Warner Bros. Interactive Entertainment
The Lego Movie Videogame	2014	TT Games, TT Fusion	Warner Bros. Interactive Entertainment
Lego Racers	1999	High Voltage Software	Lego Media
Lego Racers 2	2001	Attention to Detail	Lego Software
Lego Rock Raiders	1999	Data Design Interactive	Lego Media
Lego Star Wars: The Video Game	2005	Traveller's Tales	Eidos Interactive, Giant Interactive Entertainment
Lego Star Wars II: The Original Trilogy	2006	Traveller's Tales	LucasArts, TT Games Publishing
Lego Stunt Rally	2000	Intelligent Games	Lego Media
Lego Universe	2010	NetDevil	NetDevil
Legoland	2000	Krisalis Software	Lego Media
Leisure Suit Larry: Box Office Bust	2009	Team17	Codemasters
Leisure Suit Larry: Love for Sail!	1996	Sierra On-Line	Sierra On-Line
Leisure Suit Larry: Magna Cum Laude	2004	High Voltage Software	Sierra Entertainment
Lemmings Paintball	1996	Visual Sciences	Psygnosis
Lemmings Revolution	2000	Psygnosis	Take-Two Interactive
Lemonade Tycoon	2002	Hexacto, Jamdat	Airborne, MacPlay, EA Mobile, Broderbund
Lemonade Tycoon 2	2004	Jamdat Mobile	MumboJumbo
Lemony Snicket's A Series of Unfortunate Events	2004	Adrenium Games	Activision
Lethe – Episode One	2016	KoukouStudios	Faber Interactive
Lichdom: Battlemage	2014	Xaviant	Xaviant
Lies of P	2023	Neowiz Games, Round8 Studio	Neowiz Games
Life Is Strange	2015	Dontnod Entertainment	Square Enix
Life Is Strange 2	2018	Dontnod Entertainment	Square Enix
Lifeforce Tenka	1997	Psygnosis	Psygnosis
Lighthouse: The Dark Being	1996	Sierra On-Line	Sierra On-Line
Like Life	2004	Hooksoft	Hooksoft
Lil' Guardsman	2024	Hilltop Studios	Versus Evil, TinyBuild
Limbo	2011	Playdead	Playdead
Limbo of the Lost	2007	Majestic Studios	Tri Synergy
Line of Sight: Vietnam	2003	nFusion	Infogrames, Atari
Lineage II	2003	NCsoft	NCsoft
Links 2001	2000	Access Software	Microsoft
Links Extreme	1999	Access Software	Microsoft
Links LS 1998	1997	Access Software	Access Software
Links LS 1999	1998	Access Software	Access Software
Links LS 2000	1999	Access Software	Microsoft
Lionheart: Legacy of the Crusader	2003	Reflexive Entertainment	Interplay Entertainment
Little Big Adventure 2	1997	Adeline Software International	Electronic Arts, Activision, Virgin Interactive
Little Britain: The Video Game	2007	Revolution Studios	Blast! Entertainment Ltd
Little Fighter 2	1999	Marti Wong, Starsky Wong	
Little Fighter Online	2004	Marti Wong, Oscar Chu	U1 Technology
Littlest Pet Shop	2008	EA Salt Lake	Electronic Arts
Live for Speed	2003	LFS Team	LFS Team
Lock On: Modern Air Combat	2003	Eagle Dynamics	Ubi Soft, 1C Company
LocoMania	2006	7FX	Lighthouse Interactive
Lode Runner 2	1998	Presage Software	GT Interactive
Lode Runner Online: The Mad Monks' Revenge	1995	Presage	Sierra On-Line
Logical Journey of the Zoombinis	1996	Broderbund	Broderbund
Loki	2007	Cyanide	Focus Home Interactive, DreamCatcher Interactive
London Taxi: Rush Hour	2008	Data Design Interactive	Bold Games, Popcorn Arcade
The Long Dark	2017	Hinterland Studio	Hinterland Studio
The Long Journey Home	2017	Daedalic Entertainment	Daedalic Entertainment
The Longest Journey	1999	Funcom	Funcom
Lord of the Rings Online: Mines of Moria	2008	Turbine, Inc.	Turbine, Inc.
Lord of the Rings Online: Shadows of Angmar	2007	Turbine, Inc.	Turbine, Inc.
Lord of the Rings: Conquest	2009	Pandemic Studios	Electronic Arts
Lord of the Rings: The Battle for Middle-earth II	2006	EA Los Angeles	EA Games
Lord of the Rings: The Battle for Middle-earth II: The Rise of the Witch-king	2006	EA Los Angeles	EA Games
Lord of the Rings: The Battle for Middle-earth	2004	EA Los Angeles	EA Games
Lord of the Rings: The Fellowship of the Ring	2002	The Whole Experience Surreal Software	Universal Interactive
Lord of the Rings: The Return of the King	2003	EA Redwood Shores	Electronic Arts
Lord of the Rings: War of the Ring	2003	Liquid Entertainment	Sierra Entertainment
Lords of EverQuest	2003	Rapid Eye Entertainment	Sony Online Entertainment
Lords of Magic	1997	Impressions Games	Sierra Entertainment
Lords of Xulima	2014	Numantian Games	Numantian Games
Lords of the Fallen	2014	Deck13, CI Games	CI Games
Lords of the Fallen	2023	Hexworks	CI Games
Lords of the Realm	1997	Impressions Games	Impressions Games
Lords of the Realm II	1996	Impressions Games	Sierra Entertainment
Lords of the Realm III	2004	Impressions Games	Sierra Entertainment
Lose Your Marbles	1997	SegaSoft	SegaSoft
Lost Crown: A Ghost-Hunting Adventure	2008	Darkling Room, Shadow Tor Studios	Got Game Entertainment, Akella, Mamba Games
Lost Eidolons	2022	Ocean Drive Studio	Ocean Drive Studio
Lost Ember	2019	Mooneye Studios	Mooneye Studios
Lost Empire	2007	Pollux Gamelabs	Paradox Interactive
The Lost Mind of Dr. Brain	1995	Sierra Entertainment	Sierra Entertainment
Lost Planet: Extreme Condition	2007	Capcom	Capcom
Lost Planet 2	2009	Capcom	Capcom
Lost: Via Domus	2008	Ubisoft Montreal	Ubisoft
Lotus Challenge	2001	Kuju Entertainment	Ignition Entertainment
Lucius	2012	Shiver Games	Shiver Games, Lace Mamba Global
Lucius II: The Prophecy	2015	Shiver Games	Shiver Games
Luftwaffe Commander	1999	Eagle Interactive	Strategic Simulations, Inc.
Lugaru	2005	Wolfire Games	Wolfire Games
Lula 3D	2005	CDV Software Entertainment	CDV Software Entertainment
Lumines	2004	Q Entertainment, Opus, Fupac	Bandai, Ubisoft, Wild Games
Lunacid	2023	KIRA LLC	KIRA LLC
Lunar Remastered Collection	2025	Game Arts	GungHo Online Entertainment
Lunar: Silver Star Story Complete	1999	DigiCube	DigiCube
Lupinball	2017	Craftven	Craftven
Lust for Darkness	2018	Movie Games Lunarium	Movie Games
Lust from Beyond	2021	Movie Games Lunarium	Movie Games
Lux	2002	Sillysoft Games	Sillysoft Games
Luxor	2005	MumboJumbo	MumboJumbo
Luxor 2	2006	MumboJumbo	MumboJumbo
Luxor 3	2007	MumboJumbo	MumboJumbo
Luxor: Quest for the Afterlife	2008	MumboJumbo	MumboJumbo
