= Luxor (disambiguation) =

Luxor is a city in Upper Egypt.

Luxor may also refer to:

- Luxor Governorate, the governorate of which Luxor is the capital
- Luxor International Airport, servicing Luxor
- Luxor Museum, museum in Luxor, Egypt
- Luxor Temple, Ancient Egyptian temple complex in Luxor, Egypt
- Luxor, Pennsylvania, United States
- Luxor (album), by Robyn Hitchcock
- Luxor (video game)
  - Luxor 2
  - Luxor 3
  - Luxor: Quest for the Afterlife
  - Luxor 5th Passage
  - Luxor Evolved
- Luxor AB, a Swedish home electronics manufacturer
- Luxor Air, a charter airline based in Egypt
- Luxor Las Vegas, a hotel and casino in Las Vegas, Nevada, United States
- Luxor Peak, a summit in Nevada, US
- Luxor (pen company), an Indian pen manufacturer
- Luxor (film), a 2020 romantic drama film
- Luxor Spawndroth, a character in the Bibleman series
