= List of role-playing video games: 2014 to 2015 =

This is a comprehensive index of commercial role-playing video games (RPGs), sorted chronologically by year. Information regarding release platform, release type, RPG subgenre, game setting, developers, publishers, and country of origin is provided where available. The table can be sorted by clicking on the small boxes next to the column headings.

This list includes all RPG subgenres, including MMORPGs, Action RPGs and Tactical RPGs. This list does not include MUDs and Roguelikes by default, unless they have an additional RPG subgenre. For standalone lists on these subgenres, see List of MUDs and List of roguelikes

== Legend ==
Video game platforms
3DS	Nintendo 3DS, 3DS Virtual Console, iQue 3DS	Arcade	Arcade video game	DROID	Android
iOS	iOS, iPhone, iPod, iPadOS, iPad, visionOS, Apple Vision Pro	LIN	Linux, SteamOS	MOBI	Mobile phone
OSX	macOS	OUYA	Ouya	PS3	PlayStation 3
PS4	PlayStation 4	PSN	PlayStation Network	PSV	PlayStation Vita
WEB	Browser game	WiiU	Wii U, WiiU Virtual Console	WIN	Windows, all versions Windows 95 and up
XB360	Xbox 360, Xbox 360 Live Arcade	XBO	Xbox One		

Types of releases
Compilation	A compilation, anthology or collection of several titles, usually (but not always) belonging to the same series
Early access	A game launched in early access is unfinished and thus might contain bugs and glitches or have some of the content missing
Episodic	An episodic video game that is released in batches over a period of time
Expansion	A large-scale DLC to an already existing game that adds new story, areas and additions and/or changes to the game's mechanics
Full release	A full release of a game that launched in early access first
Limited	A special release (often called "Limited" or "Collector's Edition") with bonus collector's material. Often provided to people who pre-order a game
Port	The game first appeared on a different platform and a port was made. The game is like the original, with few or no differences
Remake	The game is an enhanced remake of an original, made using a new engine and/or assets and thus containing completely new sound, graphics and possibly changes to the story and/or gameplay
Remaster	The game is a remaster of an original, released on the same or different platform, with (usually minor) changes to graphics, sound and/or gameplay
Rerelease	The game was re-released on the same platform with no or only minor changes

Video game genres
Action RPG	Action role-playing game	Dungeon crawl	Dungeon crawl	JRPG	Japanese-style role-playing game
MMORPG	Massively multiplayer online RPG	Monster tamer	Monster-taming game	MUD	Multi-user dungeon
Real-time	Real-time game	Roguelike	Roguelike, Roguelite	Sandbox	Sandbox game
Soulslike	Soulslike	Tactical RPG	Tactical role-playing game	Turn-based	Turn-based game

== List ==
Year	Title	Platform	Type	RPG Subgenre	Setting	Developer	Publisher	COO	Ref.
2014	Abyss Odyssey	WIN		Roguelike		ACE Team	Atlus		
2014	Angry Birds Epic	DROID, iOS				Chimera Entertainment	Rovio Entertainment		
2014	Assassin's Creed Identity	DROID, iOS		Action RPG		Ubisoft Blue Byte	Ubisoft		
2014	Atelier Shallie: Alchemists of the Dusk Sea	PS3				Gust Co. Ltd.			
2014	Battleheart Legacy	iOS							
2014	Bound by Flame	WIN, PS3, XB360, PS4		Action RPG		Spiders	Focus Home Interactive		
2014	The Castle Doctrine	LIN, WIN, OSX		Roguelike		Jason Rohrer	Jason Rohrer		
2014	Chaos Reborn	LIN, WIN		Tactical RPG		Snapshot Games	Snapshot Games		
2014	Costume Quest 2	WIN, iOS, PS4, XBO		Action RPG		Double Fine Productions	Majesco		
2014	Crawl	LIN, WIN, OSX, PS4, XBO		Roguelike		Powerhoof	Powerhoof	AU	
2014	Dark Souls II	WIN, PS3, XB360, PS4, XBO		Action RPG		FromSoftware	Bandai Namco Entertainment		
2014	Dead State	WIN				DoubleBear Productions, Iron Tower Studios	DoubleBear Productions	US	
2014	Destiny	PS3, XB360, PS4, XBO		Action RPG		Bungie	Activision Publishing, Inc.		
2014	Diablo III: Reaper of Souls	WIN, PS3, XB360, PS4, XBO		Action RPG		Blizzard Entertainment	Blizzard Entertainment		
2014	Divinity: Original Sin	LIN, WIN				Larian Studios	Larian Studios		
2014	Dragon Age: Inquisition	WIN, PS3, XB360, PS4, XBO				BioWare	Electronic Arts		
2014	Dungeon of the Endless	WIN, iOS		Roguelike		Amplitude Studios			
2014	Final Fantasy Agito	DROID, iOS				Square Enix	Square Enix		
2014	Final Fantasy Explorers			Action RPG		Racjin			
2014	Final Fantasy Record Keeper	DROID, iOS				DeNA	Square Enix		
2014	Freedom Wars	PSV		Action RPG		SIE Japan Studio	Sony Interactive Entertainment		
2014	Hyper Light Drifter	LIN, WIN, OSX, Ouya, PS4, XBO		Action RPG					
2014	Hyperdevotion Noire: Goddess Black Heart	PSV		Tactical RPG		Sting Entertainment	Compile Heart		
2014	Hyperdimension Neptunia U	WIN		Action RPG		Idea Factory, Compile Heart, Tamsoft	Compile Heart		
2014	Hyperdimension Neptunia: Re;birth 2 SISTER'S GENERATION	PSV, WIN				Compile Heart, Felistella	Idea Factory		
2014	Hyperdimension Neptunia: Re;birth 3 V GENERATION	PSV, WIN				Compile Heart, Felistella	Idea Factory		
2014	Icewind Dale: Enhanced Edition	DROID, WIN, iOS				Beamdog	Atari		
2014	The Keep					Cinemax			
2014	King's Bounty: Dark Side	WIN		Tactical RPG		SoftClub	1C Company		
2014	Kingdom Hearts HD 2.5 Remix	PS3, PS4		Action RPG		Square Enix	Square Enix	JP	
2014	Legend of Grimrock II	OSX, WIN			Fantasy	Almost Human	Almost Human	FI	
2014	The Legend of Korra: A New Era Begins			Tactical RPG		Webfoot Technologies	Activision Publishing, Inc.		
2014	Lego The Hobbit	WIN, PS3, XB360, WiiU, PSV, 3DS, PS4, XBO				Traveller's Tales	Warner Bros. Interactive Entertainment		
2014	Lisa: The Painful	WIN, PS4, XBO			Post-apocalyptic	Dingaling Productions	Superflat Games		
2014	Lord of Magna: Maiden Heaven					Marvelous			
2014	Lords of the Fallen	WIN, PS4, XBO		Action RPG		Deck13 Interactive	Square Enix		
2014	Lords of Xulima	WIN				Numantian Games			
2014	Lost Dimension			Tactical RPG					
2014	Micromon	iOS							
2014	Middle-earth: Shadow of Mordor	WIN, PS3, XB360, PS4, XBO		Action RPG		Monolith Productions	Warner Bros. Interactive Entertainment		
2014	Might & Magic X: Legacy	WIN				Limbic Entertainment	Ubisoft		
2014	Might and Magic: Heroes Online	WIN				Ubisoft Blue Byte	Ubisoft		
2014	Moe Chronicle	PSV				Compile Heart			
2014 (JP)	Monster Hunter 4 Ultimate	3DS		Action RPG	Fantasy	Capcom	Capcom	JP	
2014	Mugen Souls Z					Compile Heart	Nippon Ichi Software		
2014	Natural Doctrine	PS3, PSV, PS4		Tactical RPG		Kadokawa Shoten	Kadokawa Shoten		
2014	NEO Scavenger	LIN, WIN		Roguelike		Blue Bottle Games			
2014	Nyrthos	DROID, WEB, iOS		Action RPG				CZ	
2014	One Piece Treasure Cruise	DROID, iOS				Bandai Namco Entertainment		JP	
2014	Operation Abyss: New Tokyo Legacy	WIN, PSV		Dungeon crawl			Nippon Ichi Software, 5pb., MAGES. Inc.	JP	
2014	Phantom Rift	DROID, iOS				Foursaken Media	Foursaken Media		
2014	Pokémon Omega Ruby and Alpha Sapphire	3DS		Turn-based, Monster tamer	Fantasy	Game Freak	The Pokémon Company	JP	
2014	Rise of Mana	DROID, iOS, PSV		Action RPG		Square Enix	Square Enix	JP	
2014	Risen 3: Titan Lords	WIN, PS3, XB360		Action RPG		Piranha Bytes	Deep Silver		
2014	Road Not Taken	WIN		Roguelike		Spry Fox			
2014	Rogue Stormers	WIN				Black Forest Games			
2014	Sacred 3	WIN, PS3, XB360, PSV					Deep Silver		
2014	Satellite Reign	WIN		Tactical RPG		5 Lives Studios			
2014	Second Chance Heroes	WIN, iOS		Action RPG					
2014	Shadows: Heretic Kingdoms	WIN							
2014	Soul Fjord			Roguelike		Airtight Games			
2014	South Park: The Stick of Truth	WIN, PS3, XB360				Obsidian Entertainment	Ubisoft		
2014	StarForge	WIN		Action RPG				CA	
2014	Stranger of Sword City	XB360							
2014	Super Hero Generation	PS3, PSV		Tactical RPG	Superhero, Sci-fi	Bandai Namco Entertainment	Bandai Namco Entertainment	JP	
2014	Super Heroine Chronicle	PS3, PSV		Tactical RPG	Fictional crossover	Banpresto	Bandai Namco Entertainment		
2014	Sword Art Online: Hollow Fragment	PSV, PS4					Bandai Namco Entertainment		
2014	Transistor	LIN, WIN, OSX, iOS, PS4		Action RPG		Supergiant Games	Supergiant Games		
2014	Unrest	WIN							
2014	Wasteland 2	LIN, WIN, OSX, PS4, XBO			Post-apocalyptic	inXile entertainment	Deep Silver, inXile entertainment	US	
2014	World of Warriors	DROID, iOS				Mind Candy			
2015	The Age of Decadence	LIN, WIN				Iron Tower Studios			
2015	Apotheon	WIN, PS4		Action RPG		Alientrap	Alientrap		
2015	Armello	DROID, WIN, OSX, iOS, LIN, PS4				League of Geeks	League of Geeks	AU	
2015	Atelier Sophie: The Alchemist of the Mysterious Book	WIN, PS3, PSV, PS4				Gust Co. Ltd.	Koei Tecmo Holdings	JP	
2015	Avernum 2: Crystal Souls	WIN, OSX, iOS				Spiderweb Software			
2015	Bloodborne	PS4		Action RPG		FromSoftware	SIE Japan Studio		
2015	Bravely Second: End Layer	3DS				Silicon Studio, Square Enix	Square Enix	JP	
2015	Chroma Squad	WIN		Tactical RPG		Behold Studios	Behold Studios		
2015	Citizens of Earth	WIN					Atlus		
2015	Cross of the Dutchman	WIN, PS3, XB360				Triangle Studios			
2015	The Curious Expedition	LIN, WIN, OSX		Roguelike		Maschinen-Mensch	Maschinen-Mensch		
2015	Deathtrap	WIN, XBO		Action RPG		NeocoreGames			
2015	Deception IV: The Nightmare Princess	PS3, PSV, PS4		Tactical RPG		Koei Tecmo Holdings	Koei Tecmo Holdings		
2015	Dex	LIN, WIN, PSV, Ouya		Action RPG		Dreadlocks Ltd			
2015	Digimon Story: Cyber Sleuth					Media.Vision	Bandai Namco Entertainment		
2015	Disgaea 5: Alliance of Vengeance	PS4		Tactical RPG		Nippon Ichi Software	Nippon Ichi Software		
2015	Dissidia Final Fantasy NT	Arcade, PS4		Action RPG	Fictional crossover	Team Ninja	Square Enix, Taito Corporation		
2015	Downwell	DROID, WIN, iOS		Roguelike			Devolver Digital	JP	
2015	Dragon Ball Xenoverse	WIN, PS3, PS4, XB360, XBO		Action RPG	Fantasy	Dimps	Bandai Namco Games	JP	
2015	Dragon Fin Soup	LIN, WIN, PS3, OSX, PSV, PS4		Roguelike					
2015	Dragon Quest Heroes: The World Tree's Woe and the Blight Below	WIN, PS3, PS4		Action RPG		Koei Tecmo Holdings	Square Enix		
2015	Dungeon Hunter 5	DROID, iOS		Action RPG			Gameloft		
2015	Etrian Mystery Dungeon	3DS				Atlus, Spike Chunsoft	Atlus, Nippon Ichi Software	JP	
2015	Fallout 4	WIN, PS4, XBO		Action RPG		Bethesda Game Studios	Bethesda Softworks		
2015	Fat Princess Adventures	PS4		Action RPG		Fun Bits Interactive	Sony Interactive Entertainment	US	
2015	Final Fantasy Type-0 HD	WIN, PS4, XBO		Action RPG		Square Enix, HexaDrive	Square Enix		
2015	Fossil Fighters: Frontier					Spike Chunsoft	Nintendo		
2015	Grand Kingdom	PSV, PS4		Tactical RPG			Nippon Ichi Software, Spike Chunsoft	JP	
2015	Guild of Dungeoneering	WIN				Gambrinous	Versus Evil		
2015	Hand of Fate	LIN, WIN, OSX, PS4, XBO		Action RPG				AU	
2015	Hylics	WIN		Action RPG		Mason Lindroth		US	
2015	Kult: Heretic Kingdoms	WIN							
2015	Langrisser Re:Incarnation Tensei	3DS		Tactical RPG		Masaya	Aksys Games	JP	
2015	The Legend of Legacy	3DS			Medieval fantasy	Grezzo	Atlus		
2015	The Legend of Sword and Fairy 6	WIN				Softstar	Changyou, Softstar	TW	
2015	Legends of Eisenwald	WIN				Aterdux Entertainment			
2015	Luminous Arc Infinity	PSV		Tactical RPG		Felistella	Marvelous	JP	
2015	Mario & Luigi: Paper Jam				Fictional crossover	AlphaDream Corporation	Nintendo		
2015	Megadimension Neptunia VII	PS4, WIN				Compile Heart	Idea Factory		
2015	MegaTagmension Blanc + Neptune vs Zombies	PSV, WIN		Action RPG		Compile Heart, Tamsoft	Idea Factory		
2015	Metal Max: Fireworks	DROID, iOS				Kadokawa Shoten, Crea-Tech	Kadokawa Shoten	JP	
2015	Metal Saga: The Ark of Wastes	DROID, iOS				Success	Success	JP	
2015	Mobius Final Fantasy	DROID, iOS				Square Enix	Square Enix		
2015 (NA/EU)	Monster Hunter 4 Ultimate	3DS		Action RPG	Fantasy	Capcom	Capcom	JP	
2015 (JP)	Monster Hunter Generations	3DS	Original	Action RPG	Fantasy	Capcom	Capcom	JP	
2015	Mordheim: City of the Damned	WIN		Tactical RPG		Rogue Factor	Focus Home Interactive		
2015	Mystery Chronicle: One Way Heroics	PSV, PS4				Spike Chunsoft	Spike Chunsoft	JP	
2015	Overlord: Fellowship of Evil	WIN		Action RPG		Codemasters	Codemasters		
2015	Overture	WIN		Roguelike		Black Shell Games		US	
2015	Pillars of Eternity	LIN, WIN, OSX				Obsidian Entertainment	Paradox Interactive		
2015	Pokémon Rumble World			Action RPG		Ambrella	The Pokémon Company		
2015	Pokémon Super Mystery Dungeon			Roguelike		The Pokémon Company, Spike Chunsoft	The Pokémon Company		
2015	Prodigy	WIN		Tactical RPG					
2015	Project X Zone 2	3DS		Tactical RPG	Fictional crossover	Monolith Soft, Banpresto	Bandai Namco Entertainment	JP	
2015	Runestone Keeper	WIN, OSX, iOS, DROID		Roguelike		Blackfire Games	Blackfire Games		
2015	Shadowrun: Hong Kong	WIN		Tactical RPG		Harebrained Schemes			
2015	Shin Megami Tensei: Devil Survivor 2 Record Breaker	3DS		Tactical RPG			Nintendo, Nippon Ichi Software	JP	
2015	Star Wars: Galaxy of Heroes	DROID, iOS					Electronic Arts		
2015	Star Wars: Uprising	DROID, iOS		Action RPG		Kabam	Disney Interactive Studios		
2015	Stella Glow	3DS		Tactical RPG		Imageepoch			
2015	Steven Universe: Attack the Light!	DROID, iOS		Tactical RPG		Grumpyface Studios	Cartoon Network	US	
2015	Sunless Sea	LIN, WIN, OSX		Roguelike		Failbetter Games	Failbetter Games		
2015	Superdimension Neptune VS Sega Hard Girls	PSV, WIN				Compile Heart, Felistella	Idea Factory		
2015	Sword Art Online: Lost Song	PS3, PSV, PS4		Action RPG		Artdink	Bandai Namco Entertainment	JP	
2015	Sword Coast Legends	WIN				n-Space, Digital Extremes			
2015	Tales of Zestiria	WIN, PS3				Bandai Namco Entertainment, Bandai Namco Studios	Bandai Namco Entertainment	JP	
2015	Tokyo Mirage Sessions ♯FE	WiiU			Fictional crossover	Atlus	Nintendo		
2015	Tokyo Xanadu	PSV				Nihon Falcom	Nihon Falcom		
2015	Trine 3: The Artifacts of Power	WIN				Frozenbyte	Frozenbyte		
2015	Underrail	WIN			Sci-fi, Post-apocalyptic	Stygian Software	Stygian Software		
2015	Undertale	LIN, WIN, OSX, PS4			Fantasy	Toby Fox			
2015	Victor Vran	LIN, WIN, OSX, PS4, XBO		Action RPG	Fantasy	Haemimont Games		BG	
2015	Wakfu Raiders	DROID, iOS		Tactical RPG			Ankama	FR	
2015	The Walking Dead: Road to Survival	DROID, iOS							
2015	The Witcher 3: Wild Hunt	WIN, PS4, XBO		Action RPG		CD Projekt Red	CD Projekt Red	PL	
2015	Xenoblade Chronicles X	WiiU		Action RPG		Monolith Soft	Nintendo	JP	
2015	Zodiac: Orcanon Odyssey	iOS		Tactical RPG					
