= Luxor 5th Passage =

2010 puzzle video game

- Boxart
- Developer: Absolutist
- Publisher: MumboJumbo
- Designer: John Newcomer
- Series: Luxor
- Platforms: Windows, Mac OS X
- Release: PC; November 19, 2010; Mac; November 19, 2010
- Genre: Puzzle
- Mode: Single-player

Luxor 5th Passage, known as Luxor 5, is the sequel to Luxor, Luxor 2, Luxor 3, and Luxor: Quest for the Afterlife. It was developed by Absolutist and published by MumboJumbo in the 5th anniversary of the creation of Luxor, the first installment in the series.

== Gameplay ==
=== Adventure ===
In this mode, players create matches of three or more spheres. Every third match in a row grants a powerup that the players can catch and activate it. A number of matches is needed to finish the level. The color are red, green, yellow, blue, purple, white and black, and these colors are the same as for Luxor. The level 14-6 is added, because it breaks the record at 84 levels, which adds 14 bonus levels, with the 85% of the completion of every stage, and it will upgrade into Double Shooter along with Pharaoh's Daggers. The total levels for Luxor 5th Passage is 98, and 1 special level from Blast mode, and 15 People's Choice awards from Luxor 2, and Luxor 3.

=== Blast Mode ===
The player receives 2 minutes to clear all the balls on the level.

=== People's Choice ===
The 15 levels in this mode come from popular levels in Luxor 2 and Luxor 3.
