= London taxi (disambiguation) =

A London taxi is a car for hire in London.

London taxi may also refer to:

- London Taxi: Rush Hour, 2006 video game
- The London Taxi Company, trade name of Carbodies, a British taxi manufacturing company
