= Lemonade Stand =

1973 video game

- Developers: Bob Jamison; Charlie Kellner (Apple II)
- Publisher: Minnesota Educational Computing Consortium
- Platforms: Mainframe, Apple II
- Release: 1973: Mainframe; 1979: Apple II
- Genre: Business simulation
- Mode: Single-player

Lemonade Stand is a business simulation game created in 1973 by Bob Jamison of the Minnesota Educational Computing Consortium (MECC). In it, the player moves through several rounds of running a lemonade stand, beginning each round by making choices dependent on their current amount of money about their stock, prices, and advertising. In each round, the results are randomized based on the player's inputs, as well as affected by random events such as thunderstorms and street closures. Each round ends with a summary of the player's current status, and the game ends after 12 rounds.

In 1979, the game was ported by Charlie Kellner to the Apple II; Apple subsequently included the game with their computers throughout the 1980s. MECC also offered the game for sale as a part of bundles of children's software for Apple computers and Atari 8-bit computers. Kellner's source code was released, and has since been ported to modern computers as a free, open-source game. Reviewers of the game, both contemporary and retroactive, viewed the game as a good primer for children with regard to business and decision-making processes.

== Gameplay ==
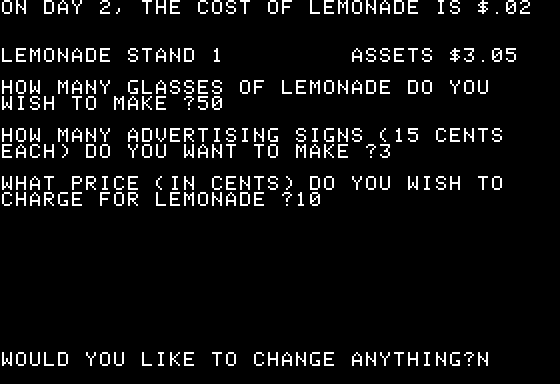
The decision-making screen

The game simulates a child's lemonade stand, where choices made by the player regarding production, prices and advertising will determine the success or failure of the enterprise. The game owed its success to offering just enough variables to create a complex challenge for users, while still providing an easy-to-grasp introduction to running a business.

The player is first given a weather report for the day (sunny, cloudy, or hot and dry, each accompanied by a color drawing) and is prompted for three values: the number of glasses of lemonade to make, the number of advertising signs, and the cost of lemonade per glass. The program then gives a report of the earnings for that day. A thunderstorm, sometimes occurring on cloudy days and accompanied by an animation, will void any profits and cause the player to lose any investment for the day. Other random events, such as street closures or the wind blowing away some signs, can also occur. The game ends after 12 rounds, or days. The game can be played either single-player or with up to 30 players (each player is independent and the sales of one do not affect another). The Apple II version included music, with bars from "Singin' in the Rain" during thunderstorms, "Raindrops Keep Fallin' on My Head" on cloudy days, "Call to the Dairy Cows" on sunny days and "Summertime" on hot and dry days. It also added color to the thunderstorm animation.

== Development ==
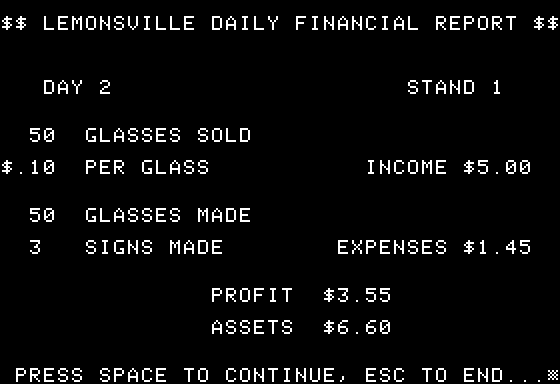
The report screen

Lemonade Stand was originally developed by Bob Jamison of the Minnesota Educational Computing Consortium in 1973 for time-shared mainframe computers.

== Ports ==
Charlie Kellner ported the game to the Apple II in February 1979, and Apple included it for free with their computers throughout the 1980s.

Minnesota Educational Computing Consortium sold Lemonade Stand as part of a bundle of seven Apple II games for children for US$25 from MECC. MECC also included the game in a package for Atari 8-bit computers.

Another Atari 8-bit version, programmed by Bob Polaro, was published through the Atari Program Exchange in 1981 as Lemonade.

== Reception ==
In 1982 David H. Ahl reviewed the game along with five other business-management simulations in Creative Computing; he indicated that it was simpler than most, and likely aimed at children, and said that it was a good teaching game for children about businesses. Elizabeth Ghaffari, in Tapping the Wisdom that Surrounds You, gave a positive review and argued that the game was a good reason for families and children to buy a microcomputer. InfoWorld's Essential Guide to Atari Computers recommended the game among educational software for the Atari 8-bit.

== Legacy ==
Kellner's Applesoft BASIC source code has been available since 1979. The game was later ported to modern REALbasic and released as free and open-source software for many platforms like Windows and macOS.

== See also ==
- Lemonade Tycoon, a similar, more recent game
