= Lupinball =

2017 dodgeball video game

- Developer: Craftven
- Publisher: Craftven
- Director: Michael Ventnor
- Artist: Christopher Stritch
- Composer: Fox Amoore
- Engine: Unity
- Platforms: Microsoft Windows; Mac OS X
- Release: WW: 17 August 2017
- Genre: Bullet hell dodgeball
- Mode: Multiplayer

Lupinball is a multiplayer bullet hell dodgeball video game developed and published by Craftven for Microsoft Windows and Mac OS X. It was released on 17 August 2017.

== Gameplay ==
Lupinball is a multiplayer bullet hell dodgeball video game for up to four players. Players play as one of seven different wolves, each with their own coloured magic fireballs. The game plays similar to dodgeball, with opposing teams collecting orbs around the playing field in order to shoot fireballs to hit and eliminate the opposing team's players. After being shot, fireballs keep bouncing around the edge of the arena and speed up over time. Players are not affected by their own coloured fireballs, and orbs can also be used to shield from the other team's fireballs. Players earn points for winning individual rounds, and a player wins the match by winning a set number of rounds.

== Development ==
Michael Ventnor, the head of Craftven, came up with the idea of Lupinball during PAX Australia 2014. He told Player2 the idea came about after canning a different idea stemming from playing Firestriker, to which his friends described as "[reinventing] Lethal League", which was unknown to him.

Lupinball was unveiled during PAX Australia 2015. Ventnor said: "Anyone can pick it up and play it within seconds. It is a game that caters to everyone’s tastes because everyone seems to get it." In a separate interview with TechRaptor, he stated his passion for the genre, and stated the game was capable of doing "everything to make you remember why this was something you did, and still want to do." A teaser trailer released for the game on 2 November 2015.

== Reception ==
After playing the game at PAX East 2017, WCSH in Portland, Maine described Lupinball as "a near-perfect multiplayer party game", with Mick Pratt of Bull Moose describing the game as easy to pick up and play.

Lupinball won PAX Aus' 2015 "Indie Showcase", and was selected in PAX East's 2017 "PAX Rising" category.
