= Hero Fighter =

2009 video game

Hero Fighter x
- Developer: Marti Wong
- Designer: Marti Wong
- Engine: Flash
- Platforms: Windows, web browser, Android, iOS
- Release: 31 July 2009
- Genre: Beat 'em up
- Mode: Multiplayer

Hero Fighter (HF) is a 2009 beat 'em up game created by Marti Wong, who was one of the designers of Little Fighter and Little Fighter 2. The game is made using flash and is still being actively developed and refined by its creator. It supports up to three players on one computer, and up to four computers on a network game mode, whereby players can challenge each other online.

== Gameplay ==
The game features a single player mode whereby players fight with or against computer operated or human-controlled fighters. Hero Fighter has a riding system in which players can jump onto horses and monsters to increase their speed or strength with lessened maneuverability. While fighting on horseback, some actions differ from when the player is on the ground. Additionally, even when a fighter is knocked down, it is still possible to deal damage to the fighter. Furthermore, fighters are able to use objects in the game, such as boulders and the trunks of trees and even jump on them as platformers.

Fighters have both Hit Points (HP) and Mana Points (MP) as many fighting games. There is also another statistic called Stamina Points (SP). These points are depleted when performing certain physical abilities, such as running, jumping and flipping. Stamina Points are regained whenever a fighter is not performing an action that requires the points. Stamina Points do not decrease when fighting on horseback.

== Development ==
Hero Fighter released its first version on 31 July 2009 as 0.1 version. It included the Versus Mode with Lucas, Shawn and Drew.

A network mode was implemented in version 0.2. Players were able to open game rooms with capacity up to for 4 computers or join one of the official rooms.

In v.0.2.2, a new feature allowed players to start a match with allied computer controlled soldiers (lancers), which allowed big armies in versus matches. Later versions added two new soldier type, archers and cavalry, and the ability to give instructions like 'follow' or 'move' to better control them.

Version 0.3 was a big game changer with the new Story Mode. At first only the three first stages were in game, with later stages being added with almost each new version. In this new version, the number of characters ingame had a big increase with the addition of minions, the later playable characters Giggs, Titto and Iczzy as bosses in each stage, and the small appearance of a few other later implemented characters as Taylor and Yaga.

Another big change hit the game in version 0.4 with the addition of a level system, locked characters and in-game accounts to record players unlocked characters and levels. Levels were first capped at 10, but with every new stage, the cap is increased by 2. Locked characters are unlocked by completing stages.

A new ride, called monster (also known as dragon or dinosaur) was implemented in version 0.5, with a few chances compared to riding common horses, such as being able to run over enemies and spit fireballs, but with the drawback of being much slower.

New mode added in version 0.65 called Battle Mode. It's a conquer the enemy type of game, which feature hireable troops, with each character having a different set of troops, resources (gold) to harvest, which are used to hire troops, and camps where troops are summoned. Each team, up to 4 team in a match, start with a single castle, and losing it game over for the team. The last standing is the winner.

Version 0.7 improved Battle Mode with some battle bonus and implemented a Premium feature, where players are able to purchase new exclusive characters. The cast of playable characters almost doubles comparing the last version, which were 10, with this version+premium, which features 19 characters.

== Hero Fighter X ==
On 6 June 2015, Marti Wong had release Hero Fighter X for Android and iOS.

It has 22 playable characters.
