= 7 Wonders of the Ancient World (video game) =

2007 video game

- Developer: Hot Lava Games
- Publisher: MumboJumbo
- Platforms: Nintendo DS, PlayStation 2, PlayStation Portable, Windows
- Release: February 2, 2007: Windows: NA: February 2, 2007 PlayStation 2: NA: November 20, 2007; PAL: April 25, 2008 Nintendo DS: NA: September 17, 2007 PlayStation Portable: NA: November 20, 2007
- Genre: Puzzle
- Mode: Single-player

7 Wonders of the Ancient World (Russian: 7 чудес) is a puzzle video game. It was developed by Hot Lava Games' Russian studio and published by MumboJumbo in February 2007. The PSP version of 7 Wonders of the Ancient World was released on the PlayStation Store in April 2009.

== Gameplay ==
Players take the task of reconstructing the Seven Wonders of the Ancient World. In each wonder, there are 5 to 7 sub-levels of runes that players switch to form a row of 3 or more runes. There are two modes of play: Free Play and Quest Mode. In Free Play, players can choose to play any level they have completed in Quest Mode.

== Reception ==
Reception

Aggregate scores
Aggregator	Score
GameRankings	DS: 62.17% PSP: 55.27%
Metacritic	DS: 60/100; PSP: 51/100

Review scores
Publication	Score
GameSpot	DS: 5/10; PSP: 5.6/10
GameSpy	2.5/5
GamesRadar+	2.5/5
IGN	DS: 6.5/10; PSP: 4.9/10

7 Wonders of the Ancient World received mixed reviews from critics upon release. On Metacritic, the game holds scores of 60/100 for the DS version based on 7 reviews, and 51/100 for the PSP version based on 10 reviews. On GameRankings, the game holds scores of 62.17% for the DS version based on 6 reviews, and 55.27% for the PSP version based on 11 reviews.

== Sequels ==
In 2007, the first sequel of 7 Wonders of the Ancient World was released as 7 Wonders II. None of the sequels to 7 Wonders of the Ancient World were released on PlayStation 2 or PlayStation Portable, but 7 Wonders II was released for the Nintendo DS in 2010. The next sequel in the 7 Wonders series of games was 7 Wonders: Treasures of Seven, which was released in 2008 and released on the DS in 2011. 7 Wonders: Magical Mystery Tour was the next game in the series released in 2011 only on PC. The final game in the series was 7 Wonders: Ancient Alien Makeover released in 2012 only on PC. Due to the dwindling market of retail PC games in the United States, 7 Wonders Ancient Alien Makeover was only released digitally in the US, although it was released physically in Europe as a collector's edition.
