= Druidstone =

2019 video game

Druidstone: The Secret of the Menhir Forest
- Humble Store header
- Developer: Ctrl Alt Ninja
- Publisher: Ctrl Alt Ninja
- Designer: Petri Häkkinen
- Programmers: Petri Häkkinen; Jussi Sammaltupa
- Artists: Juho Salila; Jyri Leppänen
- Writer: Petri Häkkinen
- Composer: Perttu Vänskä
- Platform: Windows
- Release: May 15, 2019
- Genre: Tactical role-playing
- Mode: Single-player

Druidstone: The Secret of the Menhir Forest is a tactical role-playing game developed and published by Ctrl Alt Ninja for Windows on May 15, 2019.

== Gameplay ==
Druidstone is a story driven, party-scale isometric tactical role-playing game with a focus on grid-based combat.

== Plot ==
The game takes place in the fantasy world of Elo Sphaera and follows main characters Leonhard, Aava, and Oiko on their journey.

== Release ==
Ctrl Alt Ninja was founded by the co-creators of the Legend of Grimrock series in 2015. The development of Druidstone started in autumn 2016. The game was announced on April 15, 2017. In November 2018, the release date was announced for spring 2019. In April 2019, a release date was announced for May 15, 2019. The game was originally planned to be procedurally generated but was changed to handcrafted missions. The game was also released with a level editor and modding tools.

== Reception ==
Reception

Aggregate score
Aggregator	Score
Metacritic	79/100

Review scores
Publication	Score
4Players	80/100
RPGFan	85%
RPG Site	8/10

Druidstone received "generally favorable" reviews according to review aggregator website Metacritic.

Nate Crowley of Rock Paper Shotgun said that "As it is, this is a perfectly reasonable portion of carefully planned fantasy stabbing [...]"

Greg Delmage of RPGFan summarized: "Although the story and characters are nothing new to RPGs, the strategy gameplay systems truly stand out in their seemingly simple execution."

Bryan Vitale of RPG Site said that "It's a strong overall package that, while brief, was a joy to play through."

Rock Paper Shotgun ranked Druidstone 35th on its "best strategy games on PC" list in 2020.
