= Lemonade Tycoon 2 =

2004 video game

Lemonade Tycoon 2: New York Edition
- Developer(s): Jamdat Mobile
- Publisher(s): MumboJumbo
- Platform(s): Microsoft Windows, Mac
- Release: August 2004
- Genre(s): Business simulation game
- Mode(s): Single-player

Lemonade Tycoon 2: New York Edition is the sequel to Lemonade Tycoon. This game contains more features, improved graphics, and is set in New York City, unlike its predecessor. Also, this version allowed the player to have more than one stand and the ability to have stands in more than one location at once.

Lemonade Tycoon 2 revolves around selling lemonade for a profit. The player can buy upgrades to make customers happier and make lemonade faster.

== Gameplay ==
Lemonade Tycoon 2 has three modes: Time Mode, Money Mode, and Career Mode. The Time Mode tasks the player to sell as many glasses of lemonade in a set amount of time, while in Money Mode, the player must make a certain amount of money to beat another team.

== Locations ==
Lemonade Tycoon has 19 locations where a stand can be located, which include The Bronx, Brooklyn, Greenwich Village, Central Park, Times Square, Statue of Liberty, and Grand Central Station.
