= Luxor: Quest for the Afterlife =

2008 video game

- Boxart
- Developer: MumboJumbo
- Publisher: MumboJumbo
- Series: Luxor
- Platforms: Microsoft Windows, Nintendo 3DS
- Release: Windows: NA: November 11, 2008; Nintendo 3DS: NA: May 10, 2012; EU: December 23, 2012
- Genre: Puzzle
- Mode: Single-player

Luxor: Quest for the Afterlife (known as Luxor 4) is the sequel to Luxor, Luxor 2, and Luxor 3, and has features such as Battle mode, six lands to venture through rather than just Egypt, and stories narrated by Queen Nefertiti. The game was developed by MumboJumbo LLC.

== Plot ==
Queen Nefertiti's tomb was raided by followers of Amun, led by their leader Thutmose. Of the artifacts stolen were her four canopic jars, which disturbed the rest of her afterlife, preventing her from rising to the heavens. The player, the bloodline of Queen Nefertiti, has to pursue the thieves along the Silk Road and help her retrieve back her four canopic jars so that she could rise for her afterlife.

== Gameplay ==
Artifacts were stolen from Queen Nefertiti's tomb, broken into pieces and scattered along the Silk Road. When all the artifact pieces are found, the player has to assemble them to complete the artifact. The artifacts will help out the player in the game.

=== Classic Mode ===
Similar to the previous Luxor versions, the player has to make matches of three or more of the same color to destroy the spheres. A specific number of lines of spheres have to be cleared, which is shown at the bottom-left-hand corner of the screen. At certain cases, a chest spawns at a random location. It is the artifact and can be shot to release a number of ankh coins depending on the difficulty.

=== River Mode (Nile mode) ===
A scarab is stranded at the other end of the river. The objective is to destroy the scarab by clearing all the spheres it is pushing, but there are lines of scarabs on the river, preventing the player from having a direct aim on the stray scarab.

=== Onslaught Mode (Blocker mode) ===
Statues belonging to the followers of Amun are scattered around the route, forcing the scarabs to take a shorter route to the pyramid. The statues can be destroyed by shooting them with the spheres, but they are enchanted - when destroyed, they respawn at another location after a while.

=== Battle Mode (War mode) ===
The player has to battle a thief or a wandering high prophet who has one of Queen Nefertiti's canopic jars. The treasure is in the middle of the line of spheres. The player has to make matches to spawn green pushing scarabs that will help in pushing the treasure to his side (green tent). The enemy on the other hand, will also attempt to make matches to spawn red pushing scarabs that will help in pushing the treasure to his side (red pyramid). When there are more pushing scarabs, the pushing power increases.

=== Free Play (Classic and Endless mode) ===
Any level that has been encountered in Adventure mode can be played here. There are two modes of Free Play - Classic and Endless. In Classic, the player plays it like in Adventure, but he cannot earn ankh coins from the levels. In Endless, there is an infinite number of sphere-pushing scarabs which spawn at a faster time. The player has to survive for as long as he can.

=== Puzzle Mode ===
Puzzle campaign is unlocked when the player has assembled the Sphinx in Adventure mode. In Puzzle, the spheres do not move, but the player has a limited number of spheres to clear the entire screen.

== See also ==
- Luxor
