= Firestriker =

1993 video game

- North American cover art
- Developer: Axes Art Amuse
- Publishers: JP: Hect; NA: DTMC
- Artists: Jose Shibata; Gonta Ikeda; Jun Ikeda
- Composer: Nori Atsumi
- Platform: Super NES
- Release: JP: December 17, 1993; NA: October 1994
- Genre: Action
- Modes: Single-player, multiplayer

Firestriker (ホーリーストライカー, "Holy Striker") is an overhead view action video game that was released on December 17, 1993 in Japan and in October 1994 in North America for the Super Nintendo Entertainment System.

== Summary ==
A player has to fight a boss battle against a creature that resembles a hybrid between a bird and a woman.

The four element-based kingdoms competed against each other for the Trialight, a weapon that was designed by an archmage named Wylde that can only be handled by a Firestriker. In the end, the wind kingdom won and united the four realms under their control. The archmage was not content with this peaceful world and sent in four monsters to topple this united planet. Playing as the Slader (the final Firestriker), he must help the kingdom of wind liberate the other kingdoms and defeat the monsters that lie in his path.

This game is more of a pinball-like action video game as opposed to it being a standard role-playing video game. The Trialight is a ball of fire that operates like a standard pinball. While the Firestriker can freely walk across the screen, he must prevent the Trialight from falling off the screen. Other conditions for losing is having the Firestriker get killed by monsters and failing to get the Trialight to the screen's immediate exit. The left and right shoulder buttons control a magician who always is at the bottom of the screen in one-player mode. Bosses must be defeated and other Firestrikers can be made allies in order to beat important parts of the game.

The game also allows Firestriker duels for two to four players in addition to a co-operative mode for two-player simultaneous action. Firestriker duels for four players tend to play out more like soccer matches as opposed to two-player and three-player duels.

== Reception ==
GamePro gave the game a positive review, summarizing that "Styled after Breakout, FireStriker's a new take on old - but not outdated -game play." They particularly felt that the addition of action game elements like power-ups and bosses enhance the game's depth and replay value. They further commented that while the player can lose track of the ball when the screen scrolls upward, it is generally easy to follow.
