= Oscar Chu =

Hong Kong production designer

Oscar Chu (朱仲豪 in Chinese) is the chairman of U1 Technology and U1 Game. He is the son of the Chu Ki Kwan. He is notable for serving as the production director of Little Fighter Online (小朋友齊打交Online in Chinese). He worked together on this with Marti Wong who started the Little Fighter franchise. He is also the author. Except the story of Little Fighter Online, Oscar Chu is also the creator of LFO comic and the founder of u1game.com and 88668866.com since 2004
