= Lemonade Tycoon =

2002 video game

Lemonade Tycoon Lemonade Inc.
- Developers: Hexacto, Jamdat
- Publishers: Airborne (web); MacPlay (Mac OS X); EA Mobile (iOS); Broderbund
- Engine: Adobe Shockwave
- Platforms: Microsoft Windows; Mac OS X; Palm; Windows Mobile; Java ME; iOS
- Release: Web May 2002; PocketPC, Palm December 6, 2002; Java ME September 13, 2003; Mac OS X April 13, 2005; iOS April 24, 2007
- Genre: Business simulation game
- Mode: Single player

Lemonade Tycoon, first released as Lemonade Inc., is a 2002 business simulation game created in Adobe Shockwave. A free, limited version is available for online play at many sites, while a full version with no time restrictions can be purchased online. The goal of Lemonade Tycoon is to sell lemonade for profit, progressing from the suburbs to a stadium. The last update (1.1.9) warranted a rename to Lemonade Tycoon Deluxe. In 2009, Electronic Arts published a version of Lemonade Tycoon for iOS. The sequel, Lemonade Tycoon 2: New York Edition is also available on Mac OS X, published by MacPlay.

While selling lemonade, players must look over many aspects of their business. Players decide on a recipe, set prices, and sell lemonade in a variety of locations. The game includes changing weather and news, which the player must compensate for. To overcome some factors, such as long lines and stock, players can buy upgrades. The packaged version included versions for PC, Mobile Phones, Windows Mobile Professional devices, and Palm devices. The game allows players to transfer game saves from a Windows PC to a Palm handheld or Windows Mobile Professional device and back again to continue.

Lemonade Tycoon has similarities to Lemonade Stand, a computer game originally created for the Minnesota Educational Computing Consortium in 1973 and later ported by Apple Computer for use with its then-new Apple II platform in 1979. The game also required players to make business decisions based upon weather, customers, and cost/availability of stock.

It was followed by a sequel in 2004, Lemonade Tycoon 2.

== Gameplay ==
=== Game modes ===
Lemonade Tycoon includes three game modes: Career, Challenge and Champion. Career mode lets the player have a stand for as long as they want. Challenge mode had a 30-day limit to see how fast your stand can grow within the period of time.

==== Stocks and supplies ====
In order to be able to sell lemonade, players have to buy supplies, which include ice, lemons, sugar, and cups.

==== Sales and advertising ====
The player has the option to advertise in Lemonade Tycoon. Every day, the player can pay an advertising fee, with different choices in advertising being available. Advertising increases the number of potential customers.

==== Upgrades ====
Lemonade Tycoon features many upgrades that are available at different prices. Some reduce wait times, some improve visibility, some make ice, etc. Stand upgrades allow more storage and customer capacity. There are also employees, a cashier, and a clown, which charge daily for reducing wait times and increasing patience, respectively.

==== Locations ====
There are five different locations where one can move your stand. Some places are more popular than others. Each location has a different rent. Each location has satisfaction and popularity. Popularity changes as the player's stand gets more popular. Good satisfaction and advertising bring more customers. Satisfaction ensures that customers will come back to the stand. If there are short lines, there are good prices, the player serves all customers rather than them leaving, and the player has a good recipe, the player's customer satisfaction will go up. With the increase of satisfaction, customers will come back to a player's stand. Satisfaction and popularity are location-based. They do not travel with you as you move from location to location.

==== Game factors ====
There are many News Headlines that affect the success of lemonade sales. Some headlines improve the player's business and some hurt it. Headlines change every game day and sometimes only affect a single location. Weather also affects sales; warm and hot days bring more customers than cold, rainy days. The weather changes each day and does not seem to follow predictable patterns.

=== Lemonade Stock Exchange (LSX) ===
The Lemonade Stock Exchange was an online feature that let one see how one's stand compared to others.

== Reception ==
=== Awards ===
- Best Pocket PC Strategy Game (2002 Pocket PC Magazine's Best Products Awards)

=== Applied uses ===
Learning Planet, an educational website, created the original version of the game for teaching economics and resource management for its students. The LearningPlanet.com version of Lemonade Tycoon is visually different but functionally identical to the other iterations of the game.
