= La Terre (video game) =

2003 video game

- Developer(s): Microïds
- Publisher(s): Microïds
- Platform(s): Windows PC
- Release: 2003

La Terre is an educational video game released in 2003, developed and published by Microïds. It is designed to allow the user to discover and understand the planet Earth.

The player assumes the role of a scientist, who specialises in cataclysms, and visits significant places around the world to learn about them. Viewing a volcanic eruption, feeling an earthquake and seeing the rapid progression of a tornado, are some examples of scenarios in the game. The game's production was assisted by the ministry for National Education, Research and Technology, and with the Participation of the National Center of the Cinematography and Secretariat of State in Industry.
