= Little Fighter 2 =

2000 video game

- Developers: Marti Wong, Starsky Wong
- Engine: PC
- Platform: Windows
- Release: 2000
- Genre: Beat 'em up

Little Fighter 2 (LF2, Chinese: 小朋友齊打交2) is a freeware PC fighting game for Windows and is the sequel to the game Little Fighter. Little Fighter 2 was created by Marti Wong and Starsky Wong in 2000. The first version (0.1) was released on 25 January 2000 and the full complete 1.0 version was released later that same year. The game received a long series of updates afterwards.

The game supports up to 4 human players on one computer and a total of 8 characters using online play or computer-controlled opponents. Characters are controlled using the keyboard or a gamepad. All keys can be custom set via a configuration menu.

The game has a commercially released sequel, Little Fighter Online. In 2008, in celebration of Little Fighter 2's tenth anniversary, version 2.0 was released. The update fixed minor bugs and added a gameplay recording feature, a new stage called 'Survival', a browser toolbar and ads being displayed while the game is being loaded. Version 2.0a was released in late 2009, with only a bug fix. In 2025, a commercial update Little Fighter 2 Remastered was released.

== Characters ==
There are a total of 24 playable characters, 11 of whom are initially playable:

- Template: Weak and featureless character, originally used as a base for all others.
- Deep: Yellow swordsman. A beginner-friendly character, his melee attacks are quick & powerful, but he lacks range & mobility.
- John: Defensive magician. He conjures magical spells to heal and keep enemies at bay, but has extremely poor damage against large groups of enemies.
- Henry: Musical archer. Besides shooting arrows, he can play the flute to manipulate gravity. He is quick & simple to use against large groups, but vulnerable in close combat.
- Rudolf: Navy-blue ninja. He throws ninja stars and uses gimmicks like invisibility, duplication or transformation. Like the archer, he is incredibly fast, but vulnerable in melee combat.
- Louis: Armored grappler. A slow and awkward character, notable for his ability to burst out of his armor and thus transform into LouisEX when he is near death.
- Firen: Fire mage. He can easily keep a group of enemies at bay with his fire spells, but he is heavily reliant on mana and difficult to use skillfully for combos.
- Freeze: Ice mage. A single touch of his claws or ice sword will freeze foes and energy balls alike. An excellent character for both beginners & advanced players.
- Dennis: Lean fighter that relies heavily on kicks. He can pressure his foes with homing energy balls (a barrage of small energy balls or a large tracking energy ball) or a flurry of powerful kicks. Reliant on combos to deal heavy damage.
- Woody: Veteran who excels in duels and dances around the battlefield. The reward for mastering his slow combo startup is unmatched versatility & style. Woody also has the ability to teleport at will and deploy energy blasts.
- Davis: The main protagonist. He excels at boxing and shooting rapid fire energy blasts akin to Dennis. Few can withstand the might of his dragon punch, but he tends to over-commit to his attacks.

By typing a secret code which can be revealed by beating the 'Stage Mode' on 'Difficult' difficulty, the remaining 13 characters are unlocked, 4 of whom are the boss characters:

- Bat: Appearing in stage 5–2, this boss will harass players by constantly unleashing a swarm of homing bats and firing lasers from his eyes.
- LouisEX: First appearing in stage 3–5, this spear-wielding boss is renowned for his amazing physical stats and ability to fire a shockwave from his palm multiple times in a row.
- Firzen: First appearing in stage 4–5, this master of fire & ice will cover the arena in an elemental shower. He is notorious for being able to kill a player in a single explosion or volley of meteors, Firzen also appears to be a fusion of Freeze and Firen, as when both characters are low on health, they can fuse via running into each other.
- Julian: The final boss appearing in stage 5-5, this evil spirit is a masked giant who resists damage and overwhelms his opponents with multiple homing skulls and massive energy projectiles.

The remaining 9 characters are the common minions who are fought throughout the stage:

- Bandit: The weakest but most common enemy. He has no special abilities.
- Hunter: An equally common and cowardly enemy who can stun the player with either a strike or a shot from his bow.
- Mark: A bodybuilder whose melee attacks do a massive amount of damage. He can ram the player with a powerful shoulder charge.
- Jack: A versatile fighter who uses both his Energy Blast and Flash Kick, allowing him to fight in both close and long range. Coincidentally, he resembles a protagonist of the 1997 movie "Titanic" (also named "Jack"; played by Leonardo DiCaprio), though Jack first appeared in one of the creator's older games (Davis Adventure).
- Sorcerer: A hooded magician who can shoot fire or ice balls, as well as heal himself or other enemies.
- Monk: A Shaolin monk who can push his enemies back with a shockwave palm. He only appears in Stage 5 once and Survival as an enemy, but is otherwise commonly seen as an ally.
- Jan: The only female character, she is a support magician who can conjure devils to strike each enemy from above or summon angels to heal all her allies at once.
- Knight: A giant armored warrior. His thick armor & reflective shield force players to nullify his defenses with a dash attack before hurting him, lest they get cut down by a blow of his sword.
- Justin: A masked minion who both physically and ability-wise resembles Julian. He uses a fast but short-range energy blast and a special melee punch.

Third party characters are also available for download.

== Gameplay ==
Little Fighter 2 is a fighting game. Each player chooses a character that comes with unique abilities. Attacking another character causes the attacked player to lose HP (health points), represented by a red bar on the heads-up display. Each character also has special attacks that can be activated by pressing a certain combination of keys. Most of these special attacks use up MP (mana points), represented by a blue bar on the heads-up display.

Occasionally, items may fall from above into the screen to assist players. Items range from a bottle of beer/milk, restores mana/health to a variety of weapons that can be used in combat. These include knives, baseballs, boulders, boxes, and baseball bats. All weapons take damage in combat and will eventually break.

== Game modes ==
1. VS Mode allows human and computer players to fight each other in a setting of the player's choice.
2. Stage Mode, like in many classic beat-'em-up action games, allows the players to fight their way through five stages, with bosses here and there. You can choose a stage and difficulty at startup.
3. Championship Mode sets up a tournament bracket to determine a winner. You can choose to fight individually, or with a human or computer partner.
4. Battle Mode is a team-based mode involving two sides commanding mass customisable armies of computer players.
5. Demo Mode creates random teams of computer-controlled 10 heroes, creating a zero-player game and allowing the player to be in observer mode

Difficulty can be set to Easy, Normal, Difficult or CRAZY! for all modes except demo. The code can be used in VS and Stage Mode. There is also a small online game feature which enables you to connect and experience any of the modes listed above with another person.

Version 2.0 added Playback Recording, a new mode that allows for playback of recorded gameplay. It also added Survival Stage, a new independent stage in Stage Mode, in which players fight their way through as many waves of opponents as they can before they die.

In the remastered version of Little Fighter 2 players are able to connect directly through the Steam matchmaking system, no longer requiring port forwarding which was required if players wanted to play with someone not on their local network.

== Reception ==
The November 2007 edition of PC World magazine described the game as addictive and easy to play.

== Legacy ==
=== Hero Fighter and Hero Fighter X ===
Hero Fighter is a free web-based beat 'em up created solely by Marti Wong. This game is still under development but an alpha version was released in the end of July 2009. The game has seven characters: Drew, a boxer good at close range; Lucas, a swordsman who is a balanced all-rounder; Shawn, an archer; Jenny, a defensive spear-wielding fighter (introduced in Version 1.04); Gordon, a mid ranged axe-fighter (introduced in Version 1.05); Jason, a boomerang and dagger thrower; and Taylor, a magician specialises in healing and creating clones.

=== Little Fighter Online ===
Little Fighter Online (also known as LFO, Chinese: 小朋友齊打交 Online) was developed and published by U1 Technology under direction from Oscar Chu and Marti Wong. It's based on Little Fighter 2 and was popular at launch in Hong Kong, but has shown a rapid decline in popularity since. The game servers started operation on 22 October 2004 and closed on 27 January 2016. Players complained about bugs, lags and susceptible to players cheating. Version 14 was the last version ever released and players have stopped playing due to instability and unreliability. On 22 October 2004 the game was issued in Hong Kong, followed by a release in Taiwan on 15 June 2006. It contains over 100 controllable characters and over 500 skills for players to collect.
