= Lust from Beyond =

2021 video game

- Developer: Movie Games Lunarium
- Publisher: Movie Games
- Platform: Windows
- Release: WW: March 11, 2021; M Edition (censored); February 11, 2022
- Genre: Horror
- Mode: Single-player

Lust from Beyond is a 2021 horror game developed by Movie Games Lunarium and published by Movie Games. It is the sequel to Lust for Darkness and, like the previous game, features an erotic horror story influenced by H. P. Lovecraft, H. R. Giger, and Zdzisław Beksiński.

== Gameplay ==
Players control Victor as he investigates the two cults and learns more about his power to enter Lusst'ghaa. Lust from Beyond is a horror game played from a first-person perspective and has elements of stealth games. Later in the game, players must engage in combat using knives and pistols. At some points, players can not engage in combat and must flee to safety while avoiding damage. Health is measured in terms of physical and mental trauma, both of which can be restored by power-ups. Players can also collect items, which they use in puzzles, but some puzzles are not accessible until the proper event is triggered in the story. In Lusst'ghaa, players can use psychic powers to solve puzzles. These cause a quick time event to see if they drain a special meter only used in Lusst'ghaa. Other quick time events are encountered during sex. Victor can engage in consensual sex with men, women, and inhuman creatures, and he is raped at other times during the story. If Victor dies, players are returned to the last checkpoint they visited.

== Plot ==
Victor Holloway is an antiquarian who experiences disturbing hallucinations of an otherworldly realm. He seeks help from a specialist in Bleakmoor after striking his girlfriend, Lily, following an episode while they are having sex. When Lily is kidnapped by the Scarlet Lodge, a sex cult in Bleakmoor, Victor learns that his visions allow him to enter the nightmarish dimension Lusst'ghaa. Jonathan and Amanda Moon from Lust for Darkness, who have joined the Cult of Ecstasy, save Victor from the Scarlet Lodge. As Victor attempts to rescue Lily, the two cults vie to control him.

== Development ==
Movie Games Lunarium wanted to use the lessons they learned following the release of their first game, Lust for Darkness, in their next game. One aspect of Lust for Darkness's reception that surprised them was the negative reaction to its length. They reasoned players would appreciate the lack of filler but received complaints about the lack of content. In Lust from Beyond, they included a longer story. They are based on Poland and attributed a trend of transgressive Polish games to a backlash against conservative religious movements. Influences include H. P. Lovecraft, H. R. Giger, and Zdzisław Beksiński. Lust from Beyond was crowdfunded via Kickstarter in 2019, and Movie Games released it on March 11, 2021. A version rated "M" by the ESRB was announced in June 2021, allowing for console releases. The M Edition released 10 February 2022.

== Reception ==
Lust from Beyond received mixed reviews on Metacritic. Adventure Gamers said it "tells a thoughtful, albeit unapologetically disturbing, story". They said its puzzles were not difficult, criticized the action and stealth elements, and said they had technical issues. However, they said the worldbuilding and grotesque imagery will likely appeal to fans of erotic horror. DreadXP enjoyed exploring the Giger-influenced world, but they said the game's interesting ideas end up implemented poorly.
