= Legend of Grimrock =

2012 video game

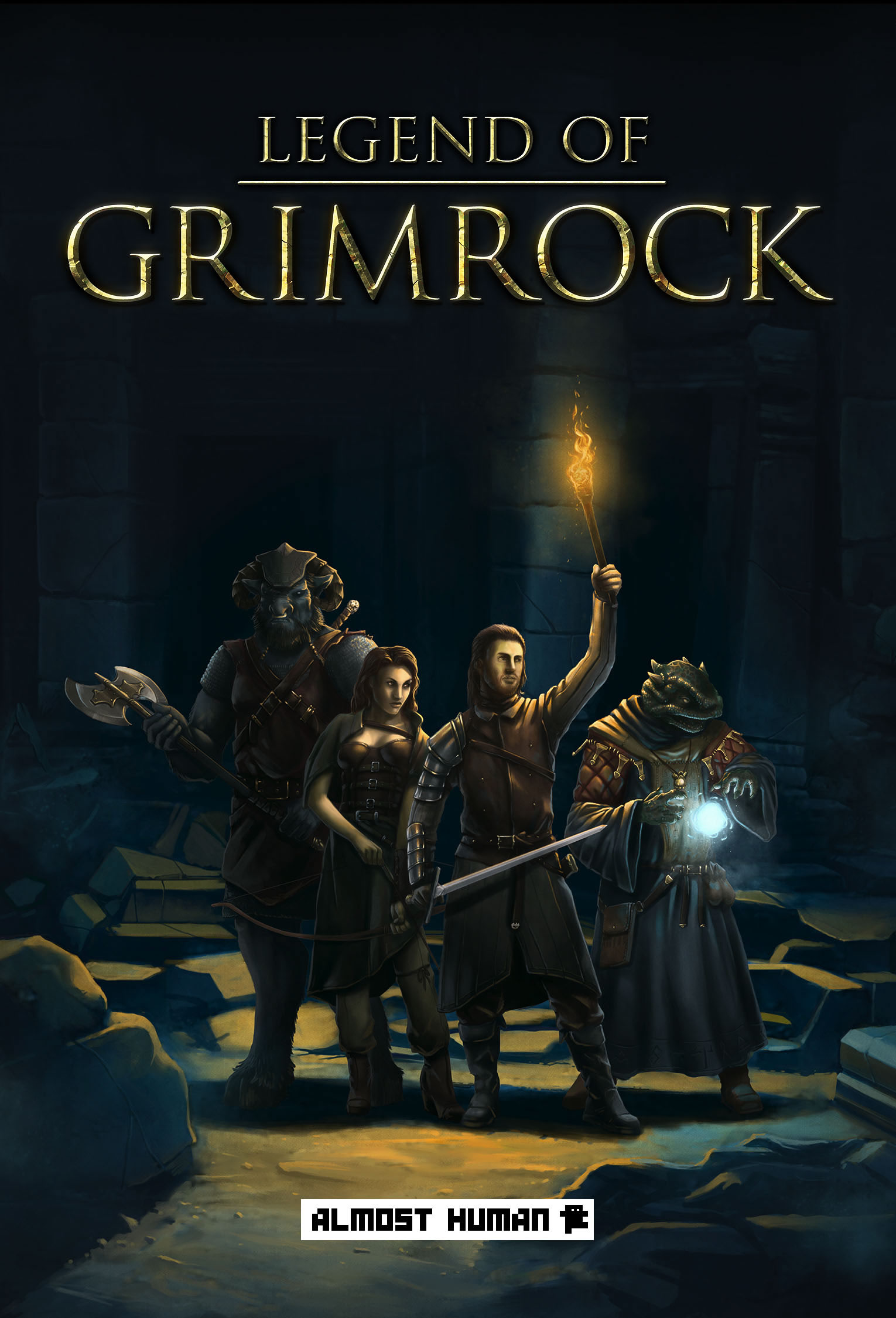
- Developer: Almost Human
- Publisher: Almost Human
- Designers: Petri Häkkinen; Antti Tiihonen
- Programmer: Petri Häkkinen
- Artist: Juho Salila
- Writers: Petri Häkkinen; Antti Tiihonen
- Platforms: Windows, OS X, Linux, iOS, Nintendo Switch
- Release: Windows; 11 April 2012; OS X, Linux; 19 December 2012; iOS; 7 May 2015; Nintendo Switch; 15 January 2024
- Genres: Action role-playing; dungeon crawler
- Mode: Single-player

Legend of Grimrock is a 2012 action role-playing game by Almost Human. It is a 3D grid-based, real-time dungeon crawler based on the 1987 game Dungeon Master. It was released for Windows in April 2012, OS X and Linux in December 2012, iOS in May 2015, and Nintendo Switch on 15 January 2024.

Legend of Grimrock was the debut game of Almost Human, a four-man Finnish indie development team formed in February 2011, which self-financed the title's development. A sequel, Legend of Grimrock II, was released in 2014.

== Gameplay ==
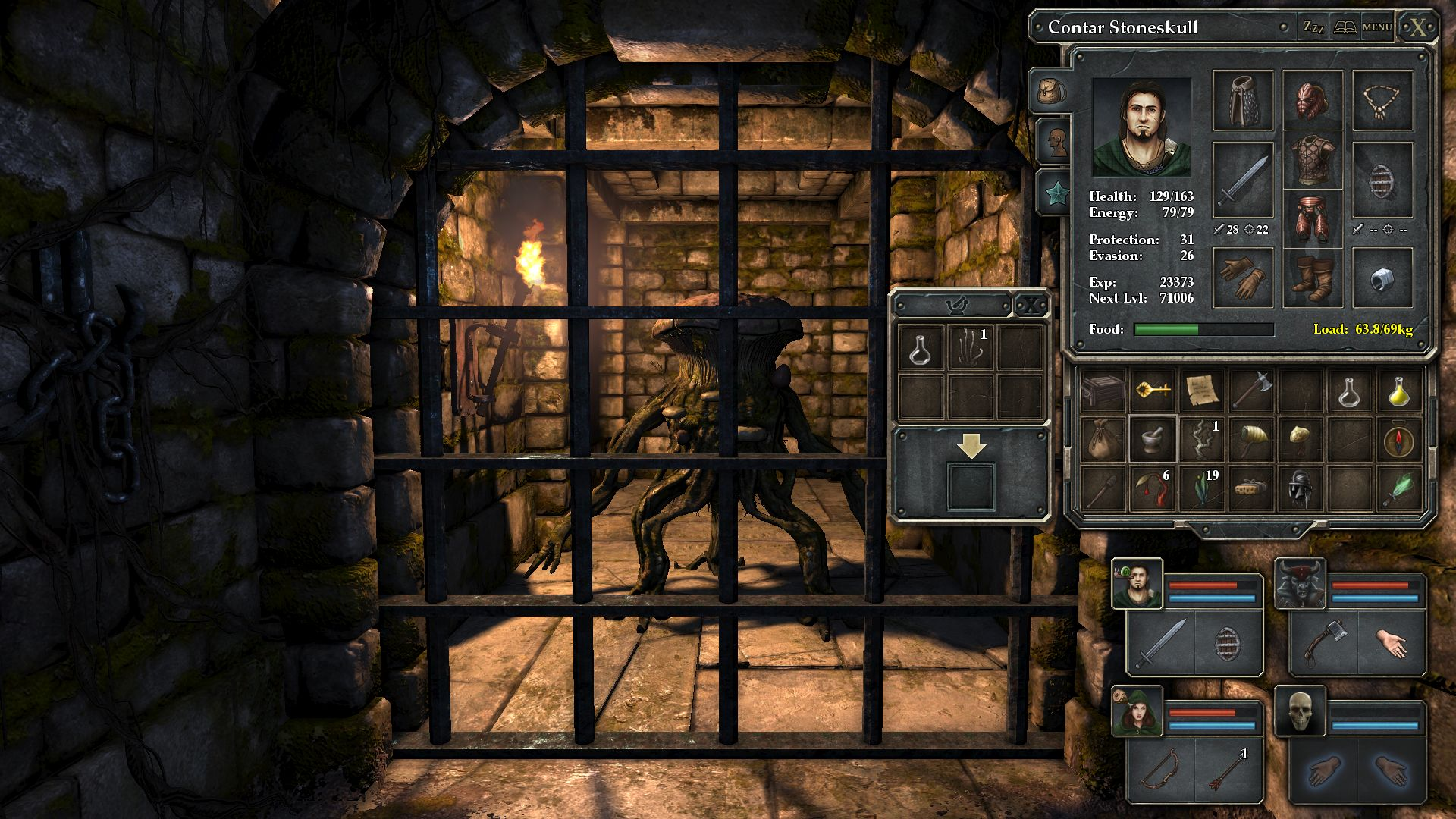
In-game screenshot with the open inventory of a party member

Legend of Grimrock is a first-person action role-playing game with tile-based movement and realtime game mechanics. Players control a party of one to four characters which they move through a 3D rendered grid-based dungeon, a style of gameplay popular in RPG games from the 1990s such as Dungeon Master and Eye of the Beholder, from which Legend of Grimrock draws heavy inspiration.

Gameplay consists of a combination of puzzle solving and combat. Characters within the party gain experience for slaying creatures and beasts within the dungeon, allowing them to increase in level and progress skills which enhance combat abilities and allow the casting of new spells, and equipment is obtained through exploration and solving of puzzles throughout the dungeon. Many of the harder puzzles throughout the game are designed as bonuses, being optional to the progression through the dungeon but granting superior items and equipment for solving them.

In reference to its classic roots, the player has the option to switch on "old-school mode" when beginning a new game. In this mode the game's map system is deactivated, leaving navigation through the dungeon's grid down to the player alone; this references the 1990s games which Grimrock is based on, which left remembering routes and paths through the dungeon completely down to the player. The game's digital manual contains a printable grid sheet which encourages players to chart their course through the game to this end.

== Plot ==
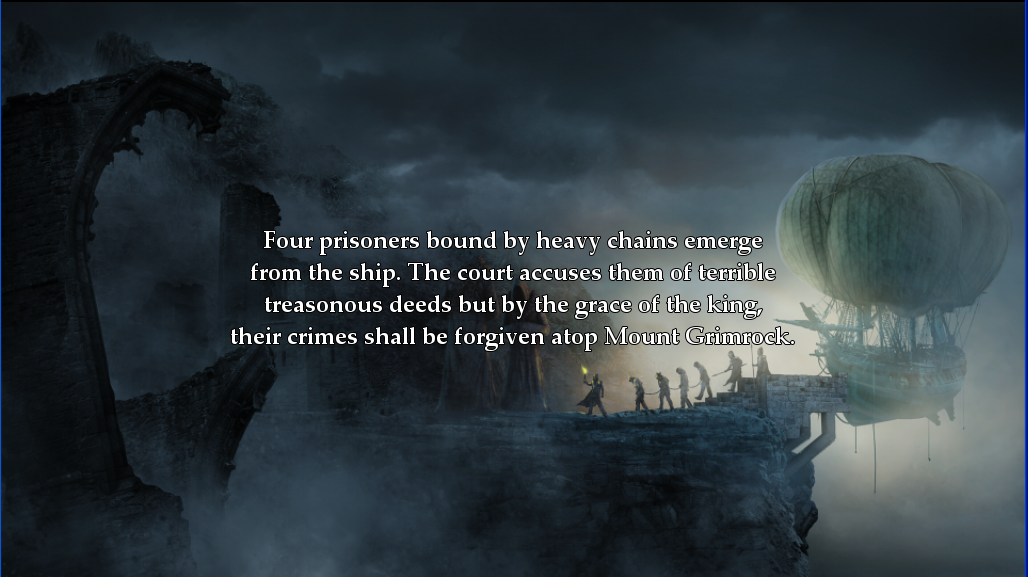
The opening cinematic showing the prisoners and their guards being dropped off at Mount Grimrock by the airship

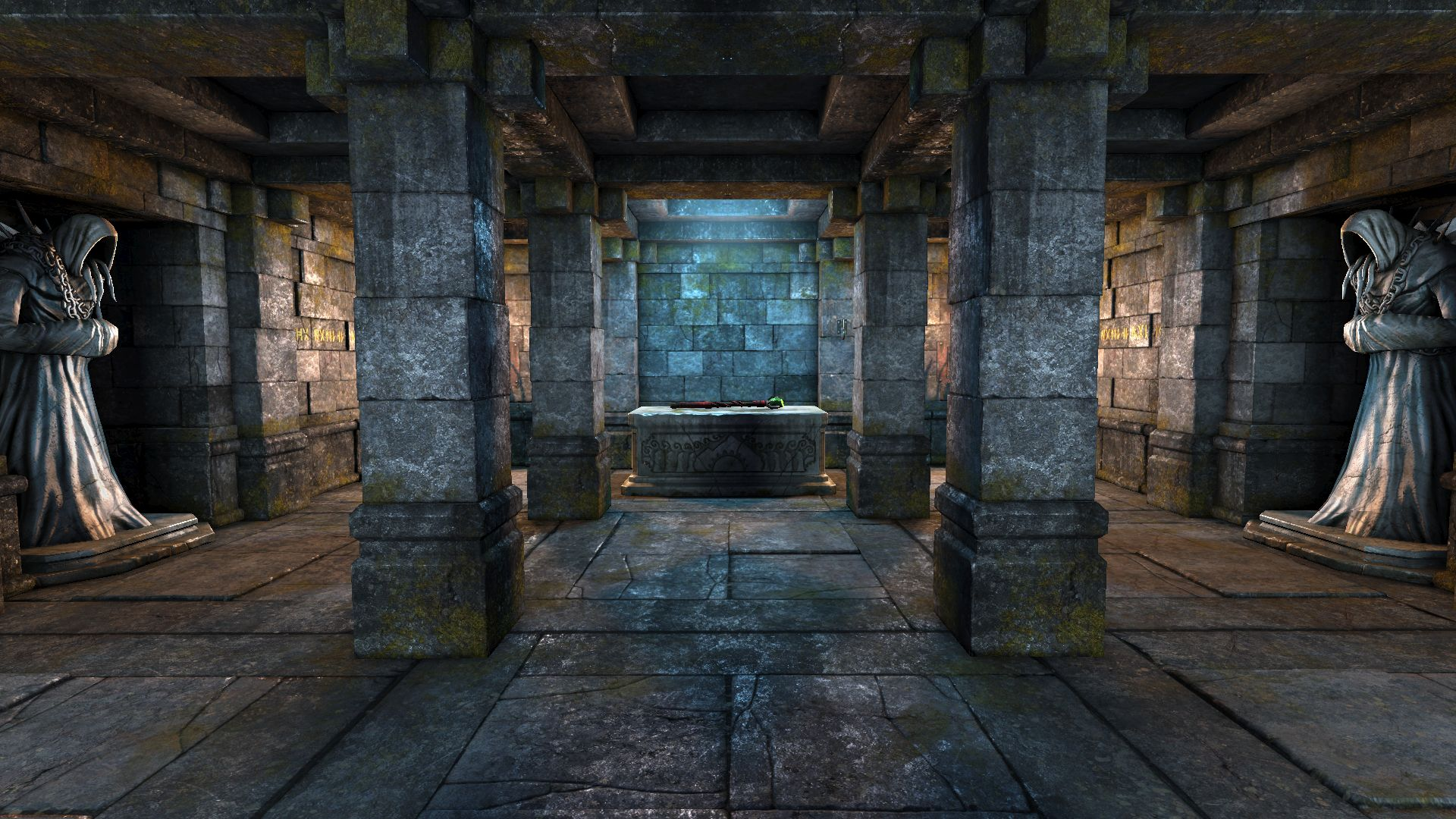
Screenshot of Legend of Grimrock showing an altar room

On top of Mount Grimrock, an airship carries a group of prisoners escorted by armed knights. The prisoners have been sentenced to be thrown into the pit of Mount Grimrock for crimes against the King, after which point they will be absolved. However, no prisoner pardoned in this manner has ever returned.

On being sealed within the mountain, the prisoners make their way downwards through the levels of Grimrock Dungeon, guided by a disembodied voice which comes to them in their sleep promising that a way of escape for both it and the party awaits at the bottom of the dungeon. The party also occasionally finds notes from a previous wanderer of the dungeon named Toorum, who aside from offering clues to certain puzzles and hidden stashes of equipment, talks about his experiences of the dungeon's periodic tremors and the dungeon's design seemingly meant to be "traversed from the top down".

Eventually the party reaches the bottom level, signposted as "Prison". Inside, the source of the voice guides the player to reconstruct a broken machine which will activate a portal out of the dungeon, however upon assembling the parts and repairing it, the voice is revealed to be the machine itself, which manifests as a giant mechanical clockwork cube which attempts to crush the party. Escaping through a portal, the party locates the tomb of the creators of Grimrock Dungeon, who left behind scrolls explaining the dungeon's purpose of containing the machine, which they refer to as "the Undying One", until "the gears of time finally come to rest". The tomb also contains a weapon designed to be used in the event of the Undying One's escape from confinement.

Using the weapon, which temporarily stuns the machine, the party disassemble the parts which they used to repair the Undying One and deal a fatal blow to it using spells of lightning. The Undying One eventually explodes and falls apart, triggering another tremor which shakes the dungeon apart. The last scenes show the party running down a stone hallway of the dungeon, before a beam of pale blue light explodes from Mount Grimrock, ascending to the sky. A gigantic crater is shown to be all that remains of Mount Grimrock, the final fate of the prisoners seemingly unknown.

== Development and release ==
In 2001, LoG began as a Dungeon Master clone hobby project called Dungeon Master 2000 by a former Amiga demoscene coder. Later it was renamed Escape from Dragon Mountain and released in its final version in 2004. In early 2011 the developers decided to grow the project beyond being a simple clone and started aiming for commercial game quality. The developers also used other games as inspiration, including Eye of the Beholder and Ultima Underworld. The developers established an indie video game company called "Almost Human" located at Matinkylä, Espoo in Finland. The four founding developers left the Finnish video game industry (Remedy Entertainment, Futuremark) and started working on the game full-time, now named Legend of Grimrock. A forum and development blog was set up and updated frequently.

The game was first released for the Windows platform on 11 April 2012 in DRM-free versions on the developer's website and GOG.com, and also a Steam version. On 4 October 2012, with the release of patch 1.3.1, an editor was included which allowed the creation of user generated dungeons & content and led to the development of a vivid modding community. On 19 December 2012 the game was released as part of the Humble Indie Bundle 7 including newly developed ports of the game for Mac OS and Linux. While the Mac and Linux port were released in December 2012, the iOS port did not materialize until May 2015. In 2014 a live-action series, located in the Grimrock universe, from Wayside Creations (the makers of Fallout: Nuka Break) was funded through Kickstarter, but never produced.

An announced sequel, Legend of Grimrock II, was released on 15 October 2014.

== Reception ==
Reception

Aggregate scores
Aggregator	Score
GameRankings	81.34% (PC)
Metacritic	82/100 (PC)

Review scores
Publication	Score
Edge	7/10
Game Informer	7.25/10
GameSpy	90/100
IGN	8.5/10
Inside Gaming	80/100

Legend of Grimrock was generally well received by both critics and gamers upon release, garnering an average critic score of 82 from 49 reviews on Metacritic. Reviewers generally praised the game for faithfully recreating the gameplay of old-school action RPGs into the modern era.

GameSpy gave the game a 4.5/5 "Great" rating, saying that "the best aspect of Grimrock is its puzzles, which have been largely abandoned by RPG developers in this age of Internet hints and walkthroughs." Destructoid's Patrick Hancock awarded the game a score of 95/100, claiming "Grimrock takes an old-school feel and injects it seamlessly into the modern era." Edge said that the game wasn't "a love letter to Dungeon Master" but "a near-facsimile", saying that "Legend Of Grimrock replicates a classic faithfully enough to massage the nostalgia glands of anyone who played the original, and it's a test of the timelessness of an almost universally loved game."

Some reviewers commented negatively on the game's combat system. Jon Blyth of PC Gamer praised the game's revival of Dungeon Master's classic gameplay, but commented on the "exploitability" of the enemy AI, as "any single enemy, no matter how tough, can be dominated by a series of cowardly stab-retreats and sidesteps". In their 7.25/10 review, Game Informer also stated that while the game's modern presentation of an old-school game format was a "beautiful marriage", it failed in that "its lazy monster design encourages the worst kind of tedious, mechanically abusive player behavior, though, which is a grave offense in the world of party-based RPGs."

In January 2013, Almost Human announced that the game had sold over 600,000 copies. In October 2014, Almost Human announced that the game has sold 900,000 copies.

In 2017, the game was selected for a collection of 100 Finnish games, which were presented on the opening of the Finnish Museum of Games in Tampere.

== See also ==
- Druidstone, a fantasy RPG from the same developers
