= Micromon =

2014 video game

- The logo for Micromon
- Developer: MOGA
- Publisher: Pocket Trend
- Platforms: iOS, Android
- Release: July 31, 2014
- Genre: RPG

Micromon (also known as Micromon: The Legend of Vaithe) is a 2014 video game released for iOS and, formerly, Android. It has frequently been described as the first successful Pokémon-inspired game for iOS (Nintendo had not released a game within the franchise on Apple devices. It later released Camp Pokémon, Pokémon Go and Pokémon Duel).

== Production and release ==
The 6 Micromon types are demonstrated here with their symbols. The Database is similar to the Pokédex from the Pokémon series, which shows if each individual creature has been seen before or caught, and provides data and statistics about each upon further taps.

Micromon is in the genre of monster-capture RPG. It was developed by indie game studio MOGA which is located in Costa Rica, published by Pocket Trend, and programmed entirely by a person with the alias Omegas7. IGN explained "The game has been in development for at least two years, following a failed Kickstarer campaign in 2012. According to MOGA's Kickstarter, MOGA wasn't pleased with the quality of other monster-capture RPGs already available on mobile devices and wanted to do better. When Micromon failed to meet its fundraising goals, MOGA promised the game would still be released on the App Store—minus some features". After two years, the game was finally released on July 31, 2014 and both topped the Apple Charts at No. 1 for Paid games and No. 38 for Top Grossing. The game "bears a striking resemblance to Nintendo's Pokémon franchise". It has in-app purchases. Pocket Trend described it as a "fully animated monster catching game".

== Plot ==
The main character has been sucked into the digital world called Pixekai and "your avatar immediately meets a quirky professor and is given a vague mission to explore a large and varied world, taming as many of the 250 different Micromon as you can, and leading them into battle against other tamers for fun and profit". Players are also instructed to defeat 4 Legion Members in order to achieve the title S-ranked tamer. As you explore, a darker grander story starts to unfold, with a Team Rocket-esque evil corporation called Black Root, a mythical Micromon called Vaithe, and eventually a plot to save the world ensue. By the end of the game the bridge between the real and digital worlds is crumbling and only the player can stop it. There are various mini-plots involving the unique towns, including a love story and a game of hide-and-seek with 2 mischievous twins. Touch Arcade notes "thanks to some excellent, colorful graphics, it's still a fun place to explore. Each of the towns has a very different style, and although there are a lot of reused objects, the towns and the houses have a nice lived-in feeling to them". A side-quest involves the player collecting four chip fragments.

== Gameplay ==
This is Tamer battle taking place within Micromon. Similarities between the game and Pokémon are numerous and easily identifiable. An example of a difference is the top-left hand side of the screen, which shows the order of turns.

The gameplay is very similar to Pokémon games, with some minor differences. Players carry up to 6 Micromon with them and battle other monsters with the aim of defeating or capturing them. As the world is entirely digital, Micromon are caught using chips. Players have to explore 5 worlds, and defeat Tamers they come across. Acquiring special Eggs allow them to randomly spin for a new Micromon, which then can become part of their party. There are 6 Micromon types: Water, Mineral, Normal, Wind, Fire, and Special. The game "borrow[s] the fundamental mechanics of exploiting innate weaknesses of monster types and leveling a team up", as well as evolving. As well as changes involving which type is weak or strong against another, another big change is that "instead of permanently forgetting a move to learn a new one, Micromon retain all of their skills, letting you decide which four to equip at any time". Similar to Nurse Joy in the Pokémon series, there are various characters who recur in all of the worlds and provide a service. These include B002 who allows the player to travel between worlds, a man who has information on the game mechanics, and a travelling item-seller.

An online arena is also open to players, as are Safari Zone-esque areas in each world. In the former, as players win battles, they can collect prizes from a certain character that recurs in each world. These include Micromon eggs, coins, and diamonds; the latter is a special and rare currency that is used to buy things like pets, avatars, and a bike to make transport swifter. It is the currency that real-life money buys. IGN notes regarding multiplayer:

Breaking up the monotonous story is the ability to battle online against friends or strangers, which is made easy thanks to iOS. In less than 15 seconds, you can go from playing the campaign to engaging in online combat. Winning matches online rewards you with points that can be used on special items and Micromon.

== Critical reception ==
The Sydney Morning Herald rated the game a 7/10, writing "While many attempts have been made to bring a Pokémon clone to mobile devices, Micromon is the first that succeeds by any measure and despite a handful of very un-Nintendo hiccups", adding "Micromon is just different and fresh enough to serve as a reminder of what Pokémon was like at the height of its charm before decades of very similar games wore away the appeal". The review praised monster encounters, Micromon designs, fun explorable worlds, engaging story, and funny writing. While rambling characters and obligatory in-app purchases were criticised, it added the latter could be avoided through grinding.

A multiplayer option is open to players, allowing them to take a break from the storyline for one-off encounters with others. Prizes can be collected by winning battles.

IGN summed up its review by saying "I don't condone this sort of brazen, cynical game cloning, but if Nintendo won't give me a way to play Pokémon on iOS, I guess it's a good thing that someone else did", and rated the game 6.7. It wrote "Pokémon is fun because of its complex and strategic creature-battling gameplay, simple but endearing story, and colorful graphics. Micromon is a shameless but competently made copy of Pokémon, so Micromon is fun for all those same reasons. It earns no points for originality or unique personality, but… it's basically Pokémon on your iPad, so that's not bad." It noted "The big change-up is in type weaknesses, and most of them are confusing. Considering everything else that is straight-up copied, this is a weird and unnecessarily confusing change. It feels like the developers just made a mistake". It complimented the Micromon retention of all Skills learnt, allowing the player to experiment and customise: "It's such a smart, simple way to make your virtual monsters more versatile. A different IGN review said "Already, players are calling it the first "actual Pokémon" for iOS and better than Pokémon".

Touch Arcade gave the game 4.5 stars out of 5. It concluded its review by saying "Micromon is probably one of the best dollars you can spend on a Japanese-style RPG in the App Store, and if you're even slightly into monster collecting, you're going to get a fantastic amount of value out of this game. I don't think it surpasses Pokémon in any respect, but I also don't exactly see Pokémon available in the App Store, and in that magical world where I could see it, I sincerely doubt it would be selling for a dollar or even ten."
