= Lucius (video game) =

2012 video game

- Developer: Shiver Games
- Publishers: Lace Mamba Global; Shiver Games (digital)
- Designers: Johannes Aikio; Heikki Pulkkinen
- Programmer: Henrik Lidstrom
- Artist: Alessandro Laina
- Composer: Foz
- Engine: Esenthel Engine
- Platform: Microsoft Windows
- Release: 26 October 2012
- Genres: Horror, adventure
- Mode: Single-player

Lucius is a 2012 horror adventure video game developed by Finnish studio Shiver Games and published by Lace Mamba Global for Microsoft Windows. The game is centered on the six-year-old-boy Lucius, the son of Lucifer, who murders members of his household, using powers of telekinesis and mind control to orchestrate deadly accidents that lead to the deaths of multiple residents of Dante Manor. A sequel, Lucius II: The Prophecy, was released in 2015. A second sequel, Lucius III, was released in 2018.

== Plot ==
On the night of June 6, 1966, Lucius Wagner is born. Born into wealth, he lives in a luxurious manor house with his father's family. His parents are Senator Charles Wagner and his wife, Nancy. After a party celebrating his sixth birthday, he is visited by Lucifer, who informs him he has come of age to receive his "true gifts". Lucifer instructs Lucius to lock a maid in the walk-in freezer. Lucius does so. Later, he is once again visited by Lucifer, who promises Lucius great powers if he continues to sacrifice the innocent. The next morning, Detective McGuffin and a deputy are sent to investigate the death. They conclude her death was an accident.

Over the following months, Lucius carefully picks off the manor's inhabitants using household appliances and his newly acquired supernatural abilities; McGuffin dismisses each subsequent death as an accident. Following the death of Charles' campaign manager, word of mouth about the deaths reaches the press. After the poisoning of one of the manor's inhabitants, McGuffin begins to suspect the "accidental" deaths are the result of foul play. Needing a scapegoat, Lucius frames a housemaid who was having an affair with his uncle Tom. He places evidence in her room that suggests she was the murderer, and uses his mind control powers to make her death look like a suicide.

McGuffin presents evidence of her "crimes" to a distraught Tom, who begins drinking heavily to manage his grief. Lucius kills an inebriated Tom by covertly filling his liquor bottle with poison. A dying Tom realizes Lucius is responsible for the deaths in the manor, but is unable to warn anyone else.

Believing his brother drank himself to death, Charles expels McGuffin from the manor. Feeling guilty, McGuffin confesses to a priest, who believes the Wagner family needs help from the church.

Fabius, the family patriarch, refuses to attend Tom's funeral and implies his involvement with satanism to his son, Charles. Later, the manor is visited by priests and a journalist. Fabius refuses to allow them entry. Later that evening, the journalist returns and breaks into the estate. When Fabius catches the journalist, he knocks him unconscious. Fabius wakes Lucius, revealing that his existence is the result of a pact he made to pull the antichrist into his bloodline. He then orders Lucius to sneak down to the manor's ritual room to perform a sacrifice on the journalist. Determining that Fabius is no longer of any use to him, Lucius betrays him by stabbing him in the back and incinerates the journalist using pyrokinesis.

Lucius continues to kill off the residents of the manor until only Charles and Nancy remain. An increasingly disturbed Charles begins to suspect Lucius may be cursed. While attempting to prove this to a mentally unstable Nancy, he is mind-controlled into killing her with a nearby nailgun. McGuffin and his deputy arrive and witness the apparent murder. Charles accuses Lucius as he flees the scene. McGuffin pursues him, leaving Lucius in the care of his deputy. Lucius decapitates the deputy with a ceiling fan. After setting the house ablaze with his powers, Lucius is confronted by Charles and priests.

Depending on the player's choices, Charles is killed by either Lucius or McGuffin. Afterwards, Lucius leaves the burning manor with McGuffin.

== Reception ==
Reception

Aggregate score
Aggregator	Score
Metacritic	59/100

Review scores
Publication	Score
Adventure Gamers	2.5/5
Destructoid	3/10
GameSpot	6.5/10

Lucius received "mixed or average" reviews according to review aggregator Metacritic. Gaming website GameSpot said "the biggest problem is a lack of information; tips are given [...] but the core aspects of the game are not explained well". In a negative review, Adventure Gamers stated that "much of the writing and voice acting is mediocre at best". RPGFan said in a review that playing the game felt "like testing a gameplay idea rather than a fully finished title".
