= Overture (video game) =

2015 video game

- Steam digital banner art
- Developer: Black Shell Games
- Publisher: Black Shell Media
- Director: Daniel Doan
- Producer: Raghav Mathur
- Programmers: Daniel Doan, Nick Dechiara
- Composer: Rafael Langoni Smith
- Platform: Microsoft Windows
- Release: WW: January 1, 2015
- Genre: Roguelike
- Mode: Single-player

Overture is a roguelike adventure video game developed by Black Shell Games, a subsidiary of Black Shell Media LLC. The game was released on January 1, 2015 for Microsoft Windows. In the game, players select from one of 24 characters and travel throughout the game vanquishing enemies, collecting loot, and slaying monsters.

== Gameplay ==
Overture is a strategic real-time monster slaying and dungeon crawling adventure set in a retro, pixelated world. The game puts players in control of one of twenty-four playable characters, with the goal of traversing dungeons. After selecting a character, the player is thrust in the game world and is encouraged to explore the sprawling dungeon before being led to the floor down to the next dungeon. On their adventure, players must defeat different types of enemies, ranging from slimes, to skeletons and goblins. The game has permadeath, so when the player dies in the game, there isn't an option to respawn.

Players will engage in battle with various beasts in these areas via a combat system consisting of mouse buttons in conjunction with properly timed running. Winning battles grants the player gold, experience points, and sometimes, various items. In addition to the combat, players can also explore the world and rescue various non-player characters throughout the game. These NPCs will follow the player around, assisting with combat.

== Reception ==
Softpedia's Alexandru Chirila describes the game's retro visuals and smooth gameplay, stating "Overture rocks marvelous 2D pixel graphics that allow it to run smoothly on any given machine, even if it's steam or coal powered. Everything works so smooth and happens so fast that at times it's kind of hard to keep up with what's going on on the screen." She goes on to describe the game's frenetic feel with, "Crit values and fireballs fly around, you barely have an opening to dodge monsters, it get's [sic] really crazy really fast."

Operation Rainfall's Guy Rainey heavily praises the game's execution, stating "Overture is a masterpiece that has no direct comparison and one that I think everyone should own." With regard to the combat mechanics, he notes "finding yourself vastly outnumbered and coming out alive brings a very unique achievement that I haven't found anywhere else."
