= Lust for Darkness =

2018 video game

- Developer: Movie Games Lunarium
- Publishers: Movie Games; SimFabric
- Platforms: macOS; Windows; Nintendo Switch; PlayStation 4
- Release: Win, macOS; WW: June 12, 2018; Switch; WW: July 12, 2019; PlayStation 4; WW: October 16, 2020; VR October 26, 2021; VR Mature' (censored) November 18, 2021
- Genre: Horror
- Mode: Single-player

Lust for Darkness is a 2018 horror game developed by Movie Games Lunarium and published by Movie Games. It is an erotic horror story inspired by Zdzisław Beksiński, H. R. Giger, and H. P. Lovecraft. It was originally released for Windows and macOS. SimFabric published it for Switch and PlayStation 4 in 2019 and 2020, respectively. A sequel, Lust from Beyond, was released in 2021.

== Gameplay ==
Players control Jonathan Moon, who has spent the past year searching for his wife Amanda after she disappeared abruptly. When he receives a letter from Amanda insinuating that she's being held by a cult, he investigates a mansion mentioned in the letter. There, he finds a sex cult engaged in an orgy designed to open a gateway to a dimension called Lusst'ghaa, where the demonic inhabitants engage in sexual violence and torture. Lust for Darkness is played from a first-person perspective and has elements of stealth games. Players occasionally have to solve puzzles to progress, and they must enter Lusst'ghaa, where they are sometimes chased by demons that they must escape. Eventually, they confront the cult's leader in Lusst'ghaa.

== Development ==
Lust for Darkness is the first video game developed by Movie Games Lunarium. They are based in Poland and attributed a trend of transgressive Polish games to a backlash against conservative religious movements. The visuals were inspired by Zdzisław Beksiński and H. R. Giger, and the plot was inspired by H. P. Lovecraft. It was released for macOS and Windows on June 12, 2018; for Switch on July 12, 2019; and for PlayStation 4 on October 16, 2020. The Switch version, which was published by SimFabric, was temporarily removed from the Nintendo eShop in North America shortly after its release. An edited version, rated "M" by the ESRB, returned on March 20, 2020. Iron VR released a virtual reality version on October 26, 2021. It is available in both unedited and ESRB M-rated versions.

== Reception ==
On Metacritic, Lust for Darkness received mixed reviews on Windows and negative reviews on Switch. Adventure Gamers wrote that it has "an abundance of horrifying imagery" but called it an "indiscriminately gratuitous" game that fails to live up to its interesting premise. PC Gamer called it a "flimsy attempt at Horny Amnesia". Commenting on the sexual content, they said Lust for Darkness has "a juvenile, shallow fascination with sex" and criticized it for avoiding discussions of sexual trauma, anxiety, and taboos. PC Magazine Australia called it a "decent horror-adventure game". They praised its visuals and what they felt was a "genuinely refreshing" focus on sexuality that avoided crude immaturity. However, they criticized what they felt was a "weak story" and too much focus on gameplay involving stealth and evading enemies at the expense of exploration. Although Digitally Downloaded said it fell short of the standard for erotic thrillers set by Eyes Wide Shut, they felt it was "still leagues ahead of the clumsy, overly-simple idea of 'horror' that most game developers aspire to". Despite having what they felt were some unsettling scenes, Nintendo Life said most of Lust of Darkness's content is "hollow grotesquery employed for the sake of making you cringe".
