= Lucius II: The Prophecy =

2015 video game

- Developer: Shiver Games
- Publisher: Shiver Games
- Designers: Johannes Aikio; Heikki Pulkkinen; Alessandro Laina
- Programmers: Johannes Aikio; Henrik Lidstrom
- Artist: Heikki Pulkkinen
- Composer: Johannes Aikio
- Engine: Unity
- Platforms: Windows, Linux
- Release: 13 February 2015 (Windows); 10 August 2015 (Linux)
- Genres: Horror, action-adventure, stealth, sandbox
- Mode: Single-player

Lucius II: The Prophecy is a horror adventure sandbox game that serves as a loose sequel to the original Lucius. Developed and published by Shiver Games, it was announced in August 2014 and released in February 2015 for Microsoft Windows. The game received mixed reviews from critics. A sequel, titled Lucius III, was released in 2018.

== Gameplay ==
Focusing on addressing the criticisms of linearity in the original Lucius, Lucius II offers players a variety of ways to complete their objectives. Players are given the supernatural powers of Mind Control, Telekinesis, and Pyrokinesis to use as they wish. Killing NPCs and finding secrets scattered throughout levels allows players to level up in order to upgrade and earn new supernatural powers.

== Plot ==
Following the events of the first game, Detective McGuffin drives Lucius to St. Benedict's Hospital for psychiatric evaluation. Upon arriving at the hospital, Lucius reveals to McGuffin that he's the son of the devil. McGuffin realizes that Charles' accusations were correct, and Lucius was responsible for all deaths in the manor. That night, McGuffin is visited by Lucifer, who reveals to him that he was always a pawn of hell, manipulated to protect Lucius and care for him along his journey to fulfill "the prophecy".

Lucius' powers have been taken from him by Lucifer in order to "level the playing field". As a result, Lucius is committed to the psychiatric hospital for long-term treatment. For six months, Lucius remains dormant, committing no acts of evil. Despite the loss of his supernatural abilities, his natural charisma allows Lucius to grow a loyal following among the patients (his "cult"). His period of dormancy ends when Lucius meets a nun visiting the hospital and attacks her. Two hospital employees restrain him before he can kill her. He is forced into the electroshock therapy room and the shock therapy triggers his suppressed powers, killing his captors.

After escaping the treatment room, Lucius discovers that some members of his cult have committed suicide, while others are ranting about a town called Ludlow. He suspects that the prophecy has begun without him. He searches the hospital for answers, finding information about Ludlow in the hospital library. Lucius discovers that his surrogate father, Charles, survived the manor fire and is being treated in the same hospital. Lucius kills Charles before he can jeopardize "the cause" by revealing his true nature.

The cult members in the hospital repeatedly mention a boy named Issac, who is responsible for the deaths and chaos in Ludlow. Lucius realizes that Issac is also son of Lucifer, and is using the town of Ludlow as a sacrifice to gain their father's approval. Lucius is in competition with Issac to become the antichrist. Lucius summons McGuffin and uses his authority to leave the hospital.

In order to become the chosen antichrist, Lucius must fulfill the many apocalyptic prophecies of Revelations (the "trumpets"). After arriving in Ludlow, however, Lucius realizes Issac has already begun fulfilling the prophecies. In order to catch up to Issac, Lucius and McGuffin poison the water supply, destroy the power plant, and set free a swarm of locusts.

Lucius encounters Isaac at a farm. They battle, and Lucius seemingly kills Issac using salt. Upon reaching Ludlow to perform the final steps of the prophecy, Isaac reappears and attempts to kill Lucius. Lucius is able to finally kill Isaac and become the ultimate victor. Lucifer appears and gives Lucius the scroll of seven seals. The scroll details seven seals that need to be undone-- conditions that must be met to trigger the apocalypse.

Lucius then escapes from Ludlow in the back of an evacuation bus. It's revealed that McGuffin is driving the bus, and Lucifer is one of its passengers. McGuffin vows he will accompany Lucius on his journey to open the seven seals. Lucifer manifests on the bus and reveals that he has many sons but Lucius is "special" and "continues to surprise him".

In a post credits scene, Lucius can slaughter everyone else on the bus.

== Sequel ==
A sequel titled Lucius III was subsequently released on 13 December 2018, continuing the narrative and expanding on the gameplay mechanics introduced in Lucius II.

== Reception ==
Reception

Aggregate score
Aggregator	Score
Metacritic	48/100

Review score
Publication	Score
GameRevolution	2/5

Upon its release, Lucius II received mixed reviews from critics. While some praised the game's departure from linearity, diverse gameplay mechanics, and eerie atmosphere, others expressed dissatisfaction with the storytelling and gameplay. A popular aspect of the game is the chaos players are able to create, through both the use of Lucius' abilities and the game's bugs.
