= Legend of Grimrock II =

2014 video game

- Developer: Almost Human
- Publisher: Almost Human
- Designers: Petri Häkkinen; Antti Tiihonen
- Programmers: Petri Häkkinen; Henri Häkkinen
- Artist: Juho Salila
- Writers: Petri Häkkinen; Antti Tiihonen
- Composers: Perttu Vanska; Hannu Honkonen; Henri Vartio
- Platforms: Microsoft Windows, OS X
- Release: Microsoft Windows: WW: 15 October 2014; OS X: WW: 18 March 2015
- Genres: Action role-playing, dungeon crawl
- Mode: Single-player

Legend of Grimrock II is an action role-playing video game developed and published by Almost Human. It is the sequel to the 2012 title Legend of Grimrock, and was released for Microsoft Windows in October 2014, and later for OS X in March 2015.

== Gameplay ==
Like its predecessor, Legend of Grimrock II is a tile-based real-time dungeon crawler, inspired by titles such as Dungeon Master, but it adds several modern features, such as nonlinear gameplay, multi-height levels, persistent injuries, and underwater sequences. In the game, players control a party of one to four characters which they move through a 3D rendered grid-based world in first-person view.

The party characters have skill levels for weapons, magic spells, and additional traits such as evasion or alchemy. Their starting skills vary depending on their race and background, and they gain further skill points by defeating enemies.

Game progress occurs through a combination of puzzle solving and combat. The puzzles vary between observational challenges, riddles, logic puzzles, hidden treasures and environmental mechanical puzzles. Many puzzles are optional, but grant superior items and equipment for solving them. In combat, the characters in the party engage the enemies in real time, which allows for maneuvering in the environment while simultaneously fighting enemies.

The game has additional difficulty modes that turn off the in-game map system and allow saving only in predefined locations for a single time.

== Plot ==
In the game, the party of prisoners gets stranded on the mysterious island of Nex after their transport ship is caught in a severe thunderstorm and gets wrecked on the island beach. The prisoners gradually explore the island and discover forests, rivers and swamps on the ground level, and ancient ruins and crypts below it. Their progress is monitored by the elusive Island Master who alternates between providing hints for the prisoners and taunting them of upcoming challenges.

The prisoners gather a number of elemental gems scattered around the island, and use them to enter the castle that towers in the middle of the island. On top of the castle, they encounter the Island Master, defeat him, and escape from the island. An alternative ending sees the party confront the Island Master in a hidden dungeon to learn the island's real purpose: to protect and defend the secrets of creation.

== Development ==
Legend of Grimrock II was originally designed as downloadable content (DLC) for the first game. Almost Human soon realized that developing it as a DLC was constraining them because of the game engine limitations. They also had ambition and enough ideas for a full sequel. In the beginning of 2013, a decision was made to set the game on an island which drove the game design towards non-linearity. The budget was significantly higher than the first game, mainly because of the larger team size and twice as long development time. As of November 2014, the game has almost made its budget back.

== Reception ==
Reception

Aggregate score
Aggregator	Score
Metacritic	85/100

Review score
Publication	Score
Destructoid	9.5/10

Legend of Grimrock II received "generally favorable" reviews according to review aggregator Metacritic. The reviews generally praised the game's challenge level and refreshing focus on a rare genre, while noting the improvement on its predecessor due to its expanded scope, better character development, and more freedom of progression.
