= Luxor (video game) =

Video game

- Developers: MumboJumbo (Note: Developer of the main Luxor series); Absolutist (Note: Developer of Luxor 5th Passage)
- Publisher: MumboJumbo
- Designer: Scott Hansen
- Series: Luxor
- Platforms: Mac OS X Windows (Note: Luxor HD, Luxor Amun Rising HD and Luxor 2 HD in Xbox Live on Windows 11 only); Wii; Nintendo 3DS iOS; PlayStation Portable (Note: Subtitled The Wrath of Set); Android (Note: Luxor HD, Luxor: Amun Rising HD and Luxor 2 HD only); PlayStation 4 (Note: Luxor Evolved only); Xbox One (Note: Luxor Evolved only); Nintendo Switch (Note: Luxor Evolved and Luxor 2 HD only)
- Release: May 30, 2005
- Genre: Puzzle
- Mode: Single-player

Luxor is a game and series of tile-matching action puzzle video games, developed and published by MumboJumbo, with the initial release in 2005. The first sequel to this game was Luxor: Amun Rising, which was released in 2005 followed by Luxor 2, which was released in 2006 and included new gameplay, levels and bonuses. After that came Luxor 3, which featured seven gameplay modes and improved graphics. Other titles include Luxor: Quest for the Afterlife, Luxor 5th Passage and Luxor Evolved.

== Gameplay ==
Using a fireball, one of the game's many powerups, in Luxor: Amun Rising

Luxor's gameplay is similar to Puzz Loop and Zuma. The user eliminates colored magical spheres by causing three or more spheres of the same color to collide. When spheres are eliminated, nearby spheres which now form a segment of three or more of the same color will also explode in a chain reaction.

During gameplay, the on-screen spheres continuously move forward, pushed themselves by additional small scarabs. If any sphere reaches the player's pyramid, the player loses a life and is forced to restart the level. If the player succeeds in eliminating a certain number of spheres without this occurring, new spheres cease to arrive and the level can be completed by removing those which remain.

Power-ups such as the fireball are given if the player manages to make three consecutive matches.

== Games ==
List of releases
Title	Release date	HD version	Console version	Handheld version	Mobile version
Luxor	2005	Yes	No	Nintendo 3DS (Note: HD version)	BREW, J2ME iOS (Note: Original version); Android
Luxor: Amun Rising	2005	Yes	No	PSP (Note: As Luxor: The Wrath of Set and contains levels from Luxor)	iOS, Android
Luxor 2	2006	Yes	XBLA; PS2, Wii (Note: As Luxor: Pharaoh's Challenge)	PSP; Nintendo DS	iOS, Android
Luxor 3	2007	No	Wii	No	No
Luxor: Quest for the Afterlife	2008	No	No	No	No
Luxor 5th Passage	2010	No	No	No	No
Luxor Evolved	2012	No	No	No	iOS
Spin-offs
Luxor: Mahjong	2006	No	No	No	No
Luxor: Adventures	2009	No	No	No	No

== Complaint ==
After competitor Codeminion released their game StoneLoops! of Jurassica for iPhone, MumboJumbo filed a complaint with Apple requesting the game’s removal from the Apple App Store. According to MumboJumbo the game shares many similarities with the Luxor-series that could confuse customers. Apple accepted the complaint and the game was removed.
