= Legends of Eisenwald =

2015 video game

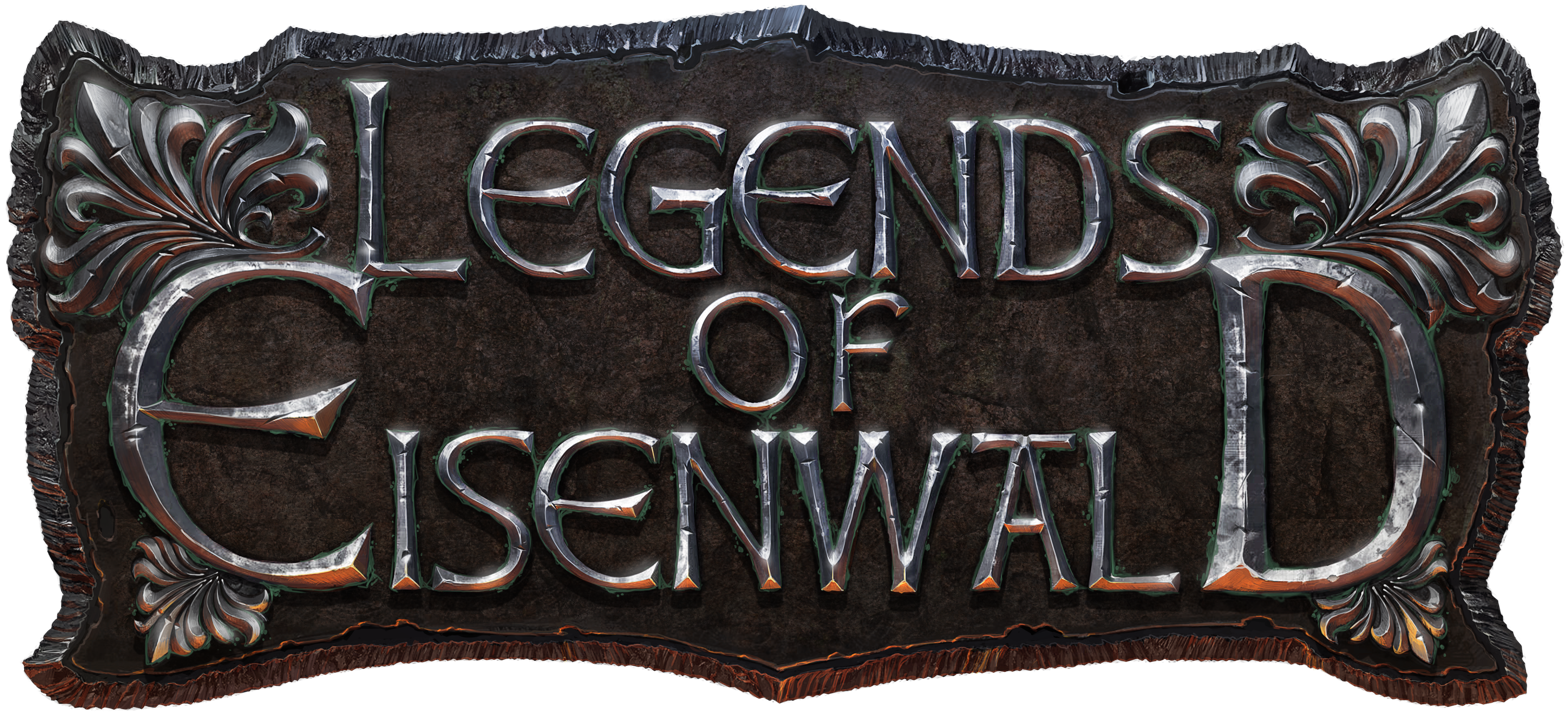
- Developer: Aterdux Entertainment
- Publisher: Aterdux Entertainment
- Engine: Aterdux Engine 9
- Platform: Microsoft Windows
- Release: July 2, 2015
- Genre: Role-playing
- Mode: Single-player

Legends of Eisenwald is a single-player tactical role-playing game developed and published by Aterdux Entertainment. The game was initially released in early access in October 2013 after a successful Kickstarter campaign, and it was officially released on Steam July 2, 2015.

== Gameplay ==
Legends of Eisenwald is a fantasy role-playing game set in a fictitious duchy of Eisenwald in medieval Germany in times of Holy Roman Empire. The main focus of the story in the main campaign revolves around the life of the youngest child of Baron Lahnstein who on return to his lands finds that the family castle is impossible to enter. There are two separate single scenarios: The Masquerade and Cursed Castle that are separate stories happening in other locations of Eisenwald.

The gameplay is divided into two main parts. Global map interactions include completing quests, buying and selling equipment, equipping the army, and managing castles and other possessions. Turn-base tactical combat takes place on a separate screen.

Battles consist of confrontations between a hero's squad (which can take up to eleven other troops) and an enemy squad. At the end of the battle, the winning side receives experience points. All units receive XP proportionally to their contribution in the battle. If sufficient XP is accumulated by a unit, it may then upgrade to another, determined by its upgrade tree if any. Upgrade of the units is free and even if a unit is not upgraded right away, its extra upgrade points are saved for later.

At the beginning of a campaign, the player may select his or her class (Knight, Baroness, or a Mystic). Each class has its own advantages. For example, a knight can learn to ride a horse, a baroness can use both bows and crossbows, and a mage can learn mass spells. Unlike regular units, heroes don't change their look when they upgrade, they can learn new skills.

Hero skill trees are divided into three parts: combat, feudal and command. Combat skills are unique for each class whereas feudal and command skills are shared among the three heroes.

The game features many different units including soldiers, spearmen, nobles, pikemen, priests, monks, healers, witches and more that have different parameters and skills.

== Reception ==
On Metacritic, the game received a score of 71/100, which it rates as "mixed or average reviews". Andy Chalk of PC Gamer called it "engaging and entertaining despite its lack of depth". Writing for IGN, Rowan Kaiser called it "a strong, simple tactical RPG" with an over-ambitious story. In his review for GameSpot, Brett Todd praised the game's novelty value for focusing on historical realism in its medieval German setting, but he said its grim atmosphere, repetitive battles, and the lack of traditional epic fantasy tropes may make players miss traditional fantasy games.
