= Luxor Evolved =

2012 video game

- Logo card
- Developers: MumboJumbo; Olde Skuul (console ports)
- Publishers: MumboJumbo; Accelerate Games (console ports)
- Producer: Chad Woyewodzic
- Artist: Chuck Lee
- Composer: Vasily Shestovets
- Series: Luxor
- Platforms: Windows, iOS, Nintendo Switch, PlayStation 4, Xbox One
- Release: Windows (Steam): March 1, 2012; iOS: 2012; Switch/PS4/XBO: June 27, 2024
- Genre: Puzzle
- Mode: Single-player

Luxor Evolved is a tile-matching video game originally released in 2012 by MumboJumbo. Luxor Evolved is a complete visual and gameplay refresh of the Luxor series, taking the previous titles' staple Ancient Egypt thematics and combining them with a retro video game aesthetic. The design philosophy is similar to that of the Pac-Man Championship Edition series, modifying the traditional match-three mechanics with an enhanced focus on both high-speed gameplay and arcade-style look and feel. Made for and first released on PC, it was quickly ported to iOS in an attempt to gain mobile marketshare. The game was later released for PlayStation 4, Xbox One, and Nintendo Switch in 2024. A port was also planned for Google Stadia, but was cancelled due to the service's discontinuation. This title is the last fully original game of the series. The game was removed from iOS's App Store in June 2025, and from Windows's Steam in July 2025 and moved to Microsoft Store.

== Gameplay ==
The objective of Luxor Evolved is similar to other marble-popping matching games such as PopCap Games's Zuma. Typical of the Luxor series, each stage includes a series of scarabs pushing a line of spheres along a path toward an open pyramid. The player must "rescue" the spheres, using a marble-launching "winged scarab" that moves across the bottom of the screen. Rescuing is accomplished by matching a chain of three or more of the same color spheres, or by using various power-ups to clear spheres more indiscriminately. If any marble completely enters the pyramid, all chains are pushed far away from the pyramid and the player loses a life.

As the player clears marbles, treasures, powerups, and life collectables will spawn and fall toward the player's scarab to be collected. Treasures spawn whenever a player clears all the marbles from a chain's "vise" (displayed as a bug on-screen), with the vise exploding into various amounts of treasure depending on how far it was along the track. Powerups spawn by scoring either three "chains" (marble-clearing shots) or "combos" (sets of spheres cleared with a single shot) without missing, and life collectables (displayed as hearts) appear when the player clears a sphere group that is five marbles or longer.

While the game is played, a multiplier can be earned in the background with fast and accurate shooting; this multiplier increases points earned by both matches and collectables, leading to many treasures becoming highly valuable, especially in higher difficulties. This multiplier has a high limit, which can make for large amounts of points, but it resets completely to the base score when a single shot is missed.

There are also "Super Powerups" unlocked over the course of play, which unlike all other collectables, spawn shards at fixed points within the level, and require the player to hit them with a sphere to be collected. Each of the three Super Powerups require six of their respective shards to activate; once all collected, the player's scarab instantly transforms into an upgraded form featuring the given power-up for a short time, allowing for spheres to be destroyed at an extremely high rate. The first one unlocked, "Force of Sekhmet", turns the player's spheres into fireballs, "The Incarnation of Horus", turns them into lightning bolts, and "The Aspect of Ra" turns them into "lightbeams" (lasers).

Luxor Evolved is a radical departure in play-style from other games in the series. In contrast to its predecessors, Evolved focuses significantly more on speed, with marble chains usually both short and moving at high velocity along the track. The levels themselves require players to clear a large number of these groups to pass, but thanks to their short length and fast appearance, these levels do not drag on, typically complete-able in under three minutes each, with the game itself beatable in under three hours total.

Another radical departure comes from level layouts as well: whereas previous games consisted of long journeys, with levels repeating many times across numerous stages, Evolved shortens the level progression significantly, having only eight stages consisting of six levels each in the main loop: with nine extra secret levels unlocked by collecting treasures, and eight additional bonus levels unlocked by completing a stage's survival level, for a total of sixty-five levels, plus a playable credits roll.

The main six levels in a stage are laid out in the following system:

- X-1, X-3, and X-4 are all regular levels with one sphere track.
- X-2 are survival stages, where the player must keep the spheres away from the pyramid for a specified time limit. Failing this level still loses a life, but unlike all others, it will merely move players on to X-3 upon death. If the player outlasts the time limit in this level, they will be sent to a bonus stage, where sphere chains move along invisible paths, to be destroyed by powerup balls for free points.
- X-5 are dual-path levels, with two separate tracks for the spheres.
- X-6 are boss levels, named and styled after Egyptian gods such as Geb, Osiris, etc. These levels require the player to match away a sphere chain moving quickly inside their body, which is frequently blocked off by other sphere chains moving in front. Bosses can also spawn their own track with a pyramid for spheres to travel on, further complicating the task.

Once the eighth boss stage is completed, the game will fake crash, putting the player into the final credits, which consists of a few non-mandatory sphere chains to shoot at before ending and showing the player's final score.

Said scoring system for this title gives a base of 100 points per sphere matched, a various amount of points per collected treasure (starting at 1000 and going up to 15000), and upon level completion an additional bonus is added based on player's shooting accuracy percentage for that round. If the players get 100% accuracy, or clear every single sphere in a bonus level, an additional large bonus is achieved. Scoring points also contributes to unlocking upgrades for powerups in-game, which enhances their effects when collected.

This score system is modified by four game difficulties: Casual, Normal, Hard, and Elite. Casual removes the life system entirely, and halves the player's score. Normal is the default mode, with base score and average sphere speed. Hard doubles all score, along with increasing the spheres' speed, and Elite, a difficulty unlocked only after beating hard mode, triples all score along with further increasing the game's speed, often to where avoiding level failures require near-perfect reaction times.

Achievements also feature prominently in this title, with a total of thirty-three to obtain while playing. Some (such as "Showing Promise", unlocked after completing the game's first level) are easily achieved during normal play, and others require certain conditions to be met, forcing the player to look for/create situations to earn them. All achievements are also obtainable concurrently on Steam, if the game was bought from that specific shopping platform.

== Visual/audial style ==
Unlike the rest of the Luxor series, this game utilizes a retro vector arcade style, taking several design cues from older arcade games, most notably from the Tempest series. Like other Luxor games, it features heavy use of elements from Ancient Egypt, with most of the level names and layouts ported over and remixed from said older titles into vector styling. All UI elements, game graphics, and supporting generated effects are drawn with vector lines, colored phosphor-style and occasionally shaded in with digital color as needed. The secret levels themselves feature exact references to nine different arcade games, in order of appearance: Asteroids, Pac-Man, Marble Madness, Berzerk, Tempest, Centipede, Dig Dug, Space Invaders, and Donkey Kong. Besides these, a Qix is also featured floating around on the pause menu, and when the last boss level is beaten, the game simulates a kill screen, showing a fake error message and "rebooting" as if it was an arcade cabinet before entering into the final credits level.

In terms of audio, the game's soundtrack consists mainly of adaptive electronic song loops, with each level number plus the secret stages having their own connected set of songs (all "X-1" levels use one set, all "X-2" levels another set, etc.). A set is split into three distinct "steps", each of which adds more instrumentation and intensity to the music. What "step" the player will hear is dependent on the player's performance in-game, with good gameplay (clearing spheres efficiently) moving the song into a more intense step. All sets also contain their own "win" and "lose" tracks, activated when the player either beats a level or runs out of lives there respectively. All of these tracks are around thirty seconds long, and loop continuously while playing through their respective levels (with the exception of the lose tracks, which are shorter and only play once upon death). The start screen, bonus levels, and credits also contain their own exclusive track, not coming in steps like the other areas.
