= MumboJumbo =

Video game developer and publisher

MumboJumbo, LLC
- Company type: Private
- Industry: Video games
- Founded: 2001; 25 years ago
- Founders: Mark Dochtermann, Ron Dimant
- Defunct: 2018
- Fate: Defunct
- Headquarters: Dallas, Texas, U.S.
- Products: Myth III: The Wolf Age; Luxor series

MumboJumbo, LLC was an independent developer of games for personal computers, game consoles and mobile devices. MumboJumbo Mobile, LLC publishes entertainment software for Android and iOS devices.

== History ==
The company was founded in January 2001 by Mark Dochtermann and Ron Dimant after leaving Ritual Entertainment. In 2003 it became one of the first independent developers to popularize casual games by partnering with portal sites to make games available for download directly to Windows and Mac computers.

MumboJumbo was previously a United Developers Company that acquired other development companies including Zono, Ritual Entertainment, and Hot Lava Studios.

On January 24, 2007, MumboJumbo announced their acquisition of Ritual Entertainment, a popular developer of first person shooter titles such as SiN and Star Trek: Elite Force II.

On January 25, 2010, a jury in the 193rd Civil District Court in Dallas County, Texas awarded MumboJumbo $4,600,000 in damages resulting from a breach of contract on the part of their former business partner PopCap Games. MumboJumbo had previously held a North American retail distribution agreement with the casual games developer. According to MumboJumbo, the relationship was violated when PopCap Games began to develop its own strategies for selling at retail. During the 12-day trial, MumboJumbo's law firm Rose-Walker showed that PopCap's actions "severely damaged" their business relationship with Walmart.

As of January 2022, their website is owned and hosted by a cybersquatting firm. While some of their games have stopped working due to changes made in macOS Monterey, they are still available for purchase from the Apple App Store.

== Games developed ==
- Myth III: The Wolf Age (2001)
- Baldur's Gate II: Shadows of Amn (2001) (Note: Responsible for the Mac OS X port)
- Luxor series:
  - Luxor (2005)
  - Luxor Amun Rising (2005)
  - Luxor Mahjong, Luxor 2 (2006)
  - Luxor 3 (2007)
  - Luxor: Quest for the Afterlife (2008)
  - Luxor Adventures (2009)
  - Luxor 5th Passage (2010)
  - Luxor HD (2011)
  - Luxor Amun Rising HD, Luxor Evolved (2012)
  - Luxor 2 HD (2013)
- Angelica Weaver: Catch Me When You Can (Note: Subtitled Be the detective; Catch the killer in the present and the past)
- Midnight Mysteries series
  - The Edgar Allan Poe Conspiracy
  - Salem Witch Trials
  - Devil on the Mississippi
  - Haunted Houdini
  - Witches of Abraham
  - Ghostwriting
- Samantha Swift series
  - The Hidden Roses of Athena
  - The Golden Touch
  - The Fountains of Fate
  - The Mystery from Atlantis
- Chainz series
  - Chainz
  - Chainz 2 Relinked
  - Chainz Galaxy
- Pickers (Note: Alternatively subtitled with Pick • Sell • Trade • Haggle • Appraise)
- Glowfish: A Magical Underwater Adventure
- Unlikely Suspects
- Discovery: A Seek and Find Adventure
- Zombie Bowl-O-Rama
- The Office
- Elements
- Tornado Jockey
- Square Logic: Everyday Genius
- Little Farm
- ZoomBook
- Johnny Bravo in The Hukka-Mega-Mighty-Ultra-Extreme Date-O-Rama
- Gearz
- Mad Caps
- UltraBall
- Twisty Tracks
- Myth Match
- Neopets: Codestone Quest

== Games not developed but published ==
- Bejeweled (Developed and also published by PopCap Games, 2001)
- Insaniquarium (Developed by Flying Bear Entertainment and also published by PopCap Games, 2001)
- Rocket Mania! (Developed and also published by PopCap Games, 2004)
- Bookworm (Developed and also published by PopCap Games, 2003)
- Zuma (Developed and also published by PopCap Games, 2003)
- Bejeweled 2 (Developed and also published by PopCap Games, 2004)
- Wildlife Tycoon: Venture Africa (Developed by Pocketwatch Games, 2005).
- Farm Frenzy (Developed by Alawar Entertainment, 2007)
- Margrave series (Developed by Inertia).
- Reaxxion
- 7 Wonders series: 7 Wonders, 7 Wonders 2, 7 Wonders: Treasures of Seven, 7 Wonders: Magical Mystery Tour, 7 Wonders: Ancient Alien Makeover
