= Lords of Xulima =

- Developer: Numantian Games
- Publisher: Numantian Games
- Director: Jesús Arribas
- Composer: Nicolas de Ferran
- Platforms: Microsoft Windows, OS X, Linux
- Release: November 14, 2014
- Genre: Role-playing
- Mode: Single-player

Lords of Xulima (pronounced SHOO-lee-mə) is a 2014 role-playing video game developed by Numantian Games, released on Microsoft Windows, Mac OS X, and Linux. It is the first title released by Numantian Games, an indie game development studio based in Madrid, Spain. After a successful Kickstarter campaign, Lords of Xulima initially released on Steam for Windows, followed by Mac and Linux.

== Gameplay ==
Lords of Xulima is a turn-based role-playing video game with a first person combat view. The movement and exploration in the game takes place in a 2D isometric view.

Parties make up of 6 characters, with 9 classes to choose from. The turn-based combat in Lords of Xulima is not timed, so players can take their time and decide their next move. Enemies on the map are finite, as players receive a bonus for completely clearing an area of enemies. Some of the enemies are static, while the rest are initiated as a random encounter.

== Development ==
Lords of Xulima was developed by Numantian Games, an independent game studio, with a custom made engine. On August 8, 2014, Lords of Xulima entered Steam Early Access. Four months later, it officially released on Steam on November 14, 2014.

== Reception ==
Reception

Aggregate score
Aggregator	Score
Metacritic	71/100

Lords of Xulima has received "mixed or average" reviews, with a 71/100 based on 9 critic reviews on Metacritic.

== Sequel ==
Lords of Xulima II is in the early development stages with no projected release date.
