= London Taxi: Rush Hour =

2006 video game

- Developer: Data Design Interactive
- Publishers: EU: Metro3D Europe (PlayStation 2 and PC); EU: Data Design Interactive (Wii); NA: Bold Games
- Platforms: PlayStation 2, Microsoft Windows, Wii
- Release: PlayStation 2: EU: 23 June 2006; Wii: NA: 12 February 2008; AU: 15 May 2008; EU: 18 April 2008
- Genre: Racing

London Taxi: Rush Hour (stylized as London Taxi: RusHour) is a Racing game developed by Data Design Interactive and published by Metro3D Europe, originally released for the PlayStation 2 and Microsoft Windows in June 2006 as a European-exclusive budget title, before being ported to the Wii and released in North America by Bold Games.

== Plot ==
The player needs to choose a cab and driver, then pick up hitchhikers and drive them to their destinations while speeding through traffic, going on sidewalks, and driving onto ramps through mid-air. It has been classified as a clone of the classic game franchise Crazy Taxi. Also because this game has no traffic lights, stop signs, or even law enforcers, the cab drivers get to ignore the speed limit and ram and/or evade other vehicles on the road just like in Crazy Taxi.

== Development ==
On 25 November 2004, Data Design Interactive announced that they had secured exclusive licensing rights to produce video games based on the FX4 taxi cab. The video game was going to be a mission-based driving game and was planned to be released for the PlayStation 2, Xbox, Microsoft Windows, and PlayStation Portable within an unknown date.

On 29 April 2005, DDI announced that the console versions would release in August, while the Windows version would be exclusively released on their online store as a digital-only release.

The console versions would not see the aforementioned release window, and nothing was said about them until July 2006, when Data Design Interactive and Metro3D released the PlayStation 2 version later on in the month. The planned Xbox and PSP versions never materialised.

In February 2007, it was announced that the game would be ported to the Wii alongside the rest of DDI's titles. 2 October 2007, the developer entered into a North American publishing deal with Bold Games to release their Wii games, with London Taxi: Rush Hour being one of the listed titles.

== Reception ==
Reception

Aggregate score
Aggregator	Score	
Aggregator	PS2	Wii
Metacritic	20/100	15/100

Review scores
Publication	Score	
Publication	PS2	Wii
GamesRadar+	N/A	1/5
IGN	N/A	1/10
PlayStation Official Magazine – UK	2/10	N/A

The PlayStation 2 version received "generally unfavorable reviews", while the Wii version received "overwhelming dislike", according to the review aggregation website Metacritic.
