= Luxor 3 =

2007 video game

- Luxor 3 Box Art
- Developer: MumboJumbo
- Publisher: MumboJumbo
- Series: Luxor
- Platforms: Windows, Wii, Mac OS X
- Release: Windows: NA: October 30, 2007; Mac: NA: May 1, 2009; Wii: NA: November 11, 2008
- Genre: Puzzle
- Mode: Single-player

Luxor 3 is an action-puzzle computer game released by MumboJumbo and a sequel to Luxor and Luxor 2. As with the other Luxor games, it maintains an Egyptian theme and revolves around Egyptian deities, involving a main gameplay goal of matching groups of three or more like-colored spheres to remove them from a train of said spheres rolling down a defined path, and preventing the spheres from entering a pyramid at the end of said path.

== Gameplay ==
Gameplay screenshot in Windows Vista

The game remains similar to that in previous editions of Luxor: the main objective is to remove spheres of many different colors (ranging from four to nine different colors) from a track of spheres before they enter the pyramid at the end of a track. The lines of colored spheres are held by a scarab at the back end, and a set number of these sets must be cleared.

Luxor 3 features canopic jars that show up in the middle of the game: they will show up multiple times in each level until it is collected by being shot at by a sphere. Collecting all of these in the first four classic mode levels of each stage will unlock a bonus level at the end of the stage. After a jar is collected in a level or if all four jars are collected for a stage, then the remainder of the level or stage, respectively, will have golden scarabs show up to be exploded as with the jars. The golden scarabs drop from three to six ankh coins depending on the game's difficulty level (Easy, Medium, Hard, Insane). At the bottom of the screen is a bar displaying the current statistics and active power-ups for a level. The Easy level does not have any scoring bonus, but the Medium, Hard, and Insane have the scoring bonus respectively (1.5X scoring bonus = Medium), (2X scoring bonus = Hard), (2.5X scoring bonus = Insane).

Power-ups can be upgraded (in the length of time or size of impact) by purchasing such upgrades in the store. The unit of currency is Ankh coins, earned by collecting these coins as they fall in the middle of the game from large sphere explosions. Many power-ups can be upgraded up to four levels such as Lightning Bolt, Fireball, Net, Slow, Speed Shot, Reverse, Stop, Color Cloud, Scorpion, Match Highlighter, and Pyramid Blocker, but the power-ups like Wild, Color Bomb, and more cannot be upgraded.

The sphere sets can be selected from the default set to other threes such as glass, wooden, and energy sphere sets, but choosing different sphere sets will not change the appearance of the wild ball. Also, the ball shooter (winged scarab) can be changed too and there are three models from which to choose. The name of the wings are SCI-FI, Xtreme! and default selection.

There are multiple gameplay modes available from the main menu: Adventure, Classic, Survival, Puzzle, and Onslaught modes. In Adventure mode, the main plot revolves around the evil Set wreaking havoc amongst the many Egyptian gods and goddesses. Each stage revolves around protecting a particular god or goddess and their power. The adventure mode is a total of 99 levels plus additional bonus levels. There are four difficulty levels. They are Easy, Medium, Hard, and Insane. Playing on harder difficulties earns more points.

=== Sphere types ===
There are ten sphere types in total (nine regular balls, plus a wild ball), each of which drops different power-ups (e.g., teal spheres always drop Color Sort) on third consecutive matches, but other than that, behaves the same for each other; they all spawn on the sphere shooter, they make a match and attracts to matching spheres. Wild spheres are the only special sphere in the game since it does not appear on the shooter, but it does not spawn on the sphere train and is obtained after catching a Wild power-up, although the game can be modded to spawn this sphere type. It matches and attracts to anything (and can destroy both sphere types at once). In addition, it can be destroyed by a Color Bomb of any color, and when hit with a Color Replacer, it replaces everything with the replacer's color.
