= Luxor 2 =

2006 video game

- Developer: MumboJumbo
- Publisher: Xbox Game Studios
- Designer: Scott Hansen
- Series: Luxor
- Platforms: Windows, Xbox 360, iOS
- Release: Windows: NA: October 10, 2006; Xbox 360: NA: April 04, 2007; iOS; June 30, 2011
- Genre: Puzzle
- Mode: Single-player

Luxor 2 is a puzzle video game developed by MumboJumbo. First released in 2006, it is the sequel to the original Luxor, which was released in 2005. The title can be played online at several different sites and is also available for purchase for Microsoft Windows and Mac OS X.

The game's console debut was in April 2007, with its release on Xbox 360 via Xbox Live Arcade. The game was removed from App Store in 2024, as with all other Luxor games released (except Luxor Evolved).

== Gameplay ==
The game challenges the player to eliminate colored magical spheres by causing three or more spheres of the same color to collide. Players do this primarily by shooting additional spheres from a winged scarab, which they guide back and forth along the bottom of the screen. When spheres are eliminated, adjacent spheres that now form a segment of three or more of the same color will also explode in a chain reaction.

During gameplay, the on-screen spheres continuously move forward, pushed by additional small scarabs. If any sphere reaches the player's pyramid, they lose a life and are forced to restart the stage. If the player succeeds in eliminating a certain number of spheres without this occurring, new spheres cease to arrive, and the level can be completed by removing those that remain.

There is a total of 88 rounds of increasing difficulty, plus 13 bonus rounds, which the player can play through. In "Story mode", the player earns titles/rankings as they progress through the various levels. Multiple difficulty settings are available as well, with play at harder difficulties yielding higher scores.

=== Levels and stages ===
The arrangement of the levels of Luxor 2 is similar to the arrangement of rounds in Zuma. The levels are divided into 14 stages in total: There are four levels in the first stage, five in the second, and six in the third. The levels themselves repeat after every third stage; however, on each repetition, a new level is added to the end of every stage. For example, levels 1–1 to 1-4 are repeated as levels 4–1 to 4-4, but level 4-5 is added. Levels 4–1 to 4-5 are repeated as levels 7–1 to 7–5, but level 7-6 is added. The pattern goes on until Stage 12. The two final stages are unique, consisting of five levels each, that are instead repeats of the additional levels from each previous stage. The final level, 14-5, is unique.

The number of colors that spheres can appear in depends on the difficulty setting. Easy starts with four colours, Medium with five, and Expert with six. Independently of difficulty, the number of colors increases by one after every three stages.

The Challenge of Horus difficulty, unlocked by completing the game on Expert, consists of all 25 unique levels at the hardest possible difficulty. Unlike every other difficulty, getting a game over on Challenge of Horus does not send the player back to the beginning of the stage they were on. Beating the game on Challenge of Horus allows players to see the ending, where Set is decisively defeated.

== Scoring ==
In general, 100 points are awarded for each sphere destroyed. Triggering multiple explosions by a chain reaction linearly increases the score multiplier for every explosion.

At the end of every round (and at times during the round), collectibles that provide bonus points are spawned. The collectibles have the form of rings, jewels, or coins. Coins have a flat value of 250 points, and for every 30 coins collected, the player earns an extra life. In contrast to the behavior of coins, jewel and ring values increase in a simple pattern as play progresses. The value follows the formula 500+250*N±250, where N is the current stage.

The score multiplier is increased on harder difficulties.

- Easy: Standard scoring
- Normal: 1.5x scoring
- Expert: 2x scoring
- Challenge of Horus: 3x scoring

== Power-ups ==
The title includes 13 different power-ups which can be collected during play. When the player sets off three or more explosions in a row, a random power-up will spawn and begin falling down across the screen. The player can collect the power-up by positioning their winged scarab to catch it. Once a power-up is collected, it either has an immediate effect or modifies the next sphere which the player will launch, depending on type. The game includes the 9 power-ups from Luxor and Luxor: Amun Rising, along with four new ones:

- Color Cloud - spawns in a random color; causes a cloud effect which changes the color of all spheres it envelopes into its color.
- Lightning Storm - causes a series of ten lightning blasts to strike and randomly eliminate spheres.
- Net - collects falling objects all across the playfield.
- Pharaoh's Dagger - changes the player's "next sphere" into a dagger which can be used to destroy any spheres it hits. The powerup grants ten daggers. In bonus stages, the player is restricted to using these.

== Luxor: Pharaoh's Challenge ==
Luxor: Pharaoh's Challenge
- Series: Luxor
- Platform: Microsoft Windows
- Genre: Puzzle
- Mode: Single-player

Luxor: Pharaoh's Challenge is a remake of Luxor 2 for the Nintendo DS, PlayStation Portable, and PlayStation 2 in 2007, and for Wii in 2008. Unlike the original Luxor 2, the remake introduces blessings to help the player on their journey to the Temple of Set. The graphics are different on every platform.

The game has a story where a songstress speaks with Thoth about the adventures of a hero who stopped Set from destroying the world.
