= Shellshock =

Shellshock or shell shock may refer to:

- Shell shock, a term coined to describe the reaction of some soldiers in World War I, or any war, to the trauma of battle

== Video games ==
- Shellshock, a 1996 tank combat video game
- M&M's: Shell Shocked, a 2001 platform video game
- Shellshock: Nam '67, a 2004 third-person shooter video game
- ShellShock Live, a 2015 artillery video game
- Shell Shockers, a 2017 first-person shooter video game

== Music ==
- Shell Shocked (album), a 1998 album by Mac
- Shell Shock (band), a metal band from New Orleans
- Shell Shock (opera), a 2014 opera by Nicholas Lens

=== Songs ===
- "Shellshock" (song), by New Order
- "Shell Shock", by Benedictum on the album Seasons of Tragedy
- "Shellshock", by Die Krupps on the album Rings of Steel
- "Shell Shock", by Gym Class Heroes on the soundtrack album Teenage Mutant Ninja Turtles: Music from the Motion Picture
- "Shellshock", by Love Battery on the album Between the Eyes
- "Shell Shock", by Heart on the album Heart
- "Shell Shock", by Manowar on the album Battle Hymns
- "Shellshock", by Onslaught on the album In Search of Sanity
- "Shellshock", by Sad Café, 1977
- "Shellshock", by Tank on the album Filth Hounds of Hades
- "Shellshock", by Tank feat. Dani Filth on the album Re-Ignition
- "Shell Shocked" (song), a song by Juicy J, Wiz Khalifa and Ty Dolla Sign

== Arts and entertainment ==
=== Films ===
- Shell Shock (film), a 1964 film directed and co-written by John Hayes and produced by and starring Beach Dickerson

=== Literature ===
- Shell Shock and Its Lessons, a 1917 non-fiction work by Grafton Elliot Smith and Tom Hatherley Pear
- Shell Shock, a 1918 one-act play by Eugene O'Neill
- Shell-Shock and Other Neuropsychiatric Problems, a 1919 non-fiction work by Elmer Ernest Southard
- "Shell Shocker", a short story featured in the 1995 collection More Tales to Give You Goosebumps
- Shell Shock (novella), a 2003 Doctor Who novella by Simon A. Forward
- Shell Shocked, a 2009 novel by Eric Walters

=== Television episodes ===
- "1914–1919 Shell Shock", The Century: America's Time episode 2 (1999)
- "#ShellShock", DC Super Hero Girls: Super Shorts episode 50 (2019)
- "Shell Shock", Ace Ventura: Pet Detective season 3, episode 7 (1999)
- "Shell Shock (Part I)", NCIS season 10, episode 6 (2012)
- "Shell Shock (Part II)", NCIS season 10, episode 7 (2012)
- "Shell Shock", Pokémon: Adventures in the Orange Islands episode 9 (1999)
- "Shell Shock", Snailsbury Tales episode (2003)
- "Shell-Shock!", StuGo episode 18b (2025)
- "Shell Shock", The Loud House season 2, episode 19 (2017)
- "Shell Shock", The Twisted Tales of Felix the Cat season 1, episode 11a (1995)
- "Shell Shock", The Why Why Family episode 2d (1996)
- "Shell Shocked", Ace of Cakes season 2, episode 10 (2007)
- "Shell Shocked", America ReFramed season 3, episode 7 (2015)
- "Shell Shocked", Chip 'n Dale: Rescue Rangers season 2, episode 29 (1989)
- "Shell Shocked", Chopped Canada season 3, episode 7 (2016)
- "Shell Shocked", Looney Tunes Cartoons season 1, episode 21a (2021)
- "Shell Shocked", Power Rangers in Space episode 4 (1998)
- "Shell Shocked", SpongeBob SquarePants season 6, episode 21b (2009)
- "Shell Shocked", The First 48 season 6, episode 18a (2008)
- "Shell Shocked", The Vanilla Ice Project season 8, episode 2 (2018)
- "Shell Shocked, Part 1", Dragons: Race to the Edge season 6, episode 12 (2017) Bob
- "Shell Shocked, Part 2", Dragons: Race to the Edge season 6, episode 13 (2017)

== Other uses ==
=== Characters ===
- Shellshock (Marvel Comics), a Marvel Comics character
- Shellshock (DC Comics), a DC Comics character
- Shellshocker, or Kusukusu in the Japanese version, a Pokémon owned by Neesha, a female trainer featured in the 1998 amine film Pokémon: The First Movie

=== Subjects ===
- Shellshock (software bug), a security hole in the Bash computer shell
- Shellshock (wildlife protection organisation), formed to protect tortoises and turtles
- Teenage Mutant Ninja Turtles Shell Shock, an amusement ride at Nickelodeon Universe

== See also ==
- The Shell Shocked Egg, a 1948 Warner Bros. Merrie Melodies cartoon
- "Shell Shocked Sheldon", Garfield and Friends season 1, episode 4b (1988)
- Shell Shockers, a 2017 .io first-person shooter video game
