= Slayaway Camp =

2016 puzzle video game

- Developer: Blue Wizard Digital
- Publisher: Blue Wizard Digital
- Engine: Unity
- Platforms: Browser; Windows; macOS; Linux; iOS; Android; Xbox One; PlayStation 4; Nintendo Switch; PlayStation Vita
- Release: 29 August 2016: Browser; 29 August 2016; Windows, macOS, Linux; 25 October 2016; iOS; 14 February 2017; Android; 13 June 2017; Xbox One, PlayStation 4; 23 October 2017; Nintendo Switch; 22 March 2018; PlayStation Vita; 20 November 2018
- Genre: Puzzle
- Mode: Single-player

Slayaway Camp is a 2016 horror-themed puzzle video game developed and published by Blue Wizard Digital. Using the setting of 1980s slasher films, it has players controlling a killer, navigating two-dimensional grids of obstacles to reach and kill their victims. Each level is a puzzle in the tradition of block-pushing puzzle games established by Sokoban. Developer Blue Wizard Digital, led by Popcap Games co-founder Jason Kapalka, sought to develop such a puzzle game but without the typical theming, which they deemed uninteresting, and described the final product as "for people who hate puzzle games".

Slayaway Camp was first released for browsers on 29 August 2016, then for Windows, macOS, Linux, iOS, Android, Xbox One, PlayStation 4, Nintendo Switch, and PlayStation Vita over the next three years. It received generally favorable reviews, with reviewers praising the puzzle design, art style, and the juxtaposition of the two, with some expressing more negative feedback about the repetitiveness of the levels and issues with the controls. The console release led to the development of Friday the 13th: Killer Puzzle (2018). A sequel, Slayaway Camp II, was released in 2024.

== Gameplay ==
A level with the player character, a victim, and various obstacles.

Slayaway Camp is a puzzle game with a horror theme, where the player controls a spree killer. Each level is set on a square grid presented in an isometric view, the goal being to kill each victim. The killer can move in the four cardinal directions, but is unable to stop moving until colliding with an obstacle, such as a wall or a victim. Moving into a victim kills them. More complex mechanics are introduced throughout, such as police officers that can stop the killer, bookcases that can be pushed over, and cats the player must keep alive.

Each level concludes with a quick-time event themed as a close-up cut scene; completing these events awards coins. Coins can be used to buy cosmetic items, including different killers and animations, or can be used on hints and walkthroughs for individual levels. Levels are grouped into chapters called videos containing 10 to 15 levels, each set in a different location. In the base game, there are ten videos and over 200 levels in total.

== Development and release ==
Slayaway Camp was developed by Blue Wizard Digital, a Canadian independent game developer led by Popcap Games co-founder Jason Kapalka. After his departure from Popcap, Kapalka wanted to work on projects he described as too violent for that studio, but still had experience in puzzle videogames. He described Slayaway Camp as a result of "the result of that unholy combination". Kapalka cited Sokoban, Minecraft, and the block-pushing puzzle game genre as influences, but a development goal was to make a puzzle game in that tradition that was "not boring". This influenced the development team's decision to theme it around slasher films, and also informed it's art style. They described the final game as "for people who hate puzzle games".

Slayaway Camp was first released on browser gaming portal Kongregate on 29 August 2016. It was subsequently released on Steam for Windows, macOS, and Linux on 25 October 2016. It was released for mobile devices, first for iOS on 14 February 2017, then on Android on 13 June 2017.

A version for consoles titled Slayaway Camp: Butcher's Cut was released, first for Xbox One on 23 October 2017, for PlayStation 4 the day after, for Nintendo Switch on 22 March 2018, and for PlayStation Vita on 20 November 2018. Butcher's Cut included previously released DLC.

== Reception ==
Reception

Aggregate score
Aggregator	Score
Metacritic	PC: 83/100 iOS: 88/100; PS4: 75/100; NS: 79/100

Slayaway Camp received "generally favorable" reviews according to review aggregation website Metacritic.

The gameplay received both positive and negative reviews. James Cunningham of Hardcore Gamer described it and level design as clever, and Carter Dotson of Touch Arcade complimented its introduction and composition of its puzzle elements. Campbell Bird of 148Apps called the puzzle design "solid", but felt that it did not stand out apart from its theming. In contrast, Simon Fitzgerald of Push Square commented that the gameplay could be repetitive, and CG Magazine's Helena Shlapak called Slayaway Camp "little long and monotonous", though Nintendo Life's Richard Atkinson said that "Just when we thought the title is getting repetitive, it throws in another element for us to cater for and made us step back and rethink". Writing for Multiplayer.it, Tommaso Pugliese criticized the quick-time events included at the end of each level. The quantity of levels and collectibles was positively received by multiple reviewers, including Pugliese, Dotson, and Olivia Falk of Cubed3.

Reviewers praised the theming, art, and animations of Slayaway Camp. Atkinson described the death sequences as entertaining and fun to watch, and praised the theming and references to specific films. Shlapak praised Slayaway Camp for its evocation of nostalgia, describing it as using this effect "exceptionally well". The juxtaposition of the horror game theming and puzzle game gameplay drew specific praise multiple reviewers, including Dotson of Touch Arcade and Christian Donlan of Eurogamer, and Rock Paper Shotgun's Adam Smith described it as "brilliant" despite not usually understanding the appeal of puzzle games.

Some reviewers criticized Slayaway Camp's controls. Cunningham commented that the controller support was poor, Nintendojo's Andy Hoover criticized a "lack of consistency" in the touchscreen controls, and Atkinson found the console port's directional pad support to be superior to the mobile version's touch controls. Slayaway Camp was named as one of the top three entries at the 2017 Google Play Indie Games Festival.

== Legacy ==
After the console release of Slayaway Camp, Blue Wizard Digital was approached by Horror Inc about producing a mobile game in the Friday the 13th franchise, which led to the development of Friday the 13th: Killer Puzzle. A sequel, Slayaway Camp II, was released on iOS and Android on 24 October 2023, and on Steam for Windows, macOS, and Linux on 28 October 2024.
