= Peggle Nights =

2008 video game

- North American PC box art
- Developer: PopCap Games
- Publisher: PopCap Games
- Series: Peggle
- Platforms: Windows; Mac OS X Xbox 360; PlayStation 3 (PlayStation Network) iOS; Nintendo DS
- Release: Microsoft Windows: NA: September 16, 2008; Steam: October 15, 2008; Mac OS X: NA: March 1, 2009; Xbox 360: NA: November 18, 2009; PlayStation 3: NA: November 19, 2009; Nintendo DS: NA: March 3, 2009
- Genre: Puzzle
- Modes: Single-player, multiplayer

Peggle Nights is a casual puzzle video game from PopCap Games, released on Windows, Mac OS X and Microsoft Xbox Live Arcade, also playable on Nintendo DS through Peggle: Dual Shot. Upon its release, PopCap marketed the game as a "follow-up" to Peggle, although an actual sequel to the 2007 PC Game was released in 2013. The gameplay between Peggle and Peggle Nights has remained largely unchanged, with each stage featuring a colorful 2D background filled with different colored "pegs". The objective in each level is to clear all of the orange pegs by hitting them with a ball shot from the top of the screen. New to this version are 60 new levels, 60 additional challenges, the introduction of the new Peggle Master Marina the Electric Squid, and the addition of an "Aced" score for each level.

PopCap gave little pre-release build-up to Peggle Nights, with only a mention of the game by founder by Jason Kapalka in a January 2008 interview and PopCap publishing its press release on the day it was released. Critical reviews of Peggle Nights were favorable, most of the praises going towards the gameplay mechanics and presentation taken from the original Peggle; however, Peggle Nights' similarity to its predecessor, as well as its narrative dream element, garnered mixed responses.

== Gameplay ==
One of the few major additions to Peggle Nights includes the character of Marina, a squid that can shoot lightning to strike a set of pegs.

Gameplay for Peggle Nights has remained similar to the original game, although additional types of style shots, such as off the wall, have been added. The primary gameplay addition to Peggle Nights is the new Peggle Master Marina.

Marina is the final Peggle master of Peggle Nights, and her power is a high risk, high reward shot. Lightning travels from the first peg touched to the center of the score bucket. The lighting eliminates all pegs in the path, including armored ones. Marina's power is best used late in the game when the score multiplier is highest. Despite being one of the strongest Peggle masters, Marina was not playable in the DS release, and did not return for Peggle 2 - though Batrina in Peggle Blast has a similar power.

As its opening theme, the game uses the classical piece "Clair de lune", the third movement from the piano suite Suite bergamasque by Claude Debussy.

== Release ==
Pre-release revelations of Peggle Nights were limited to an interview with PopCap founder Jason Kapalka published by Rock, Paper, Shotgun on January 30, 2008; he revealed it would be a "pretty straightforward 'sequel'" to Peggle, "with the primary points of appeal being dozens and dozens of new levels, one additional power-up/Peggle master, and some new kinds of challenges." He also revealed the dream aspect of the game. PopCap's press release of the game was made public the day it was released, and IGN reported a Peggle sequel had been "much-anticipated."

As of January 2010, three expansions have been released: a holiday theme, a spring theme and a pack with fan-art-based levels. All three come with extra adventure levels and challenges. While these extra levels are on the PC and Mac versions of Peggle Nights, they have not been patched into the iOS version of Peggle. The Xbox Live Arcade version of Peggle received Nights content in the form of a downloadable expansion for the game on November 18, 2009. The iPhone version of Peggle received Nights content as an In-App Purchase on October 4, 2010.

It is also unlockable in Peggle: Dual Shot for the Nintendo DS. However, in Peggle: Dual Shot, Marina is not unlockable.

== Reception ==
Reception

Aggregate score
Aggregator	Score
Metacritic	PC: 76/100; X360: 89/100

Review scores
Publication	Score
1Up.com	A−
Destructoid	8/10
Eurogamer	MAC: 7/10; PC: 6/10
GameRevolution	B+
GamesRadar+	4/5
IGN	8.4/10
PC Format	80%
PC Gamer (UK)	66%
PC Zone	80%
Play	100%
The A.V. Club	A−
Entertainment Weekly	B+
Gamezebo	4/5
Gaming Age	A
Inside Mac Games	8/10
PopMatters	7/10
The Sydney Morning Herald	4/5

Award
Publication	Award
Wired	#4 PC Game of 2008

Approbation towards aspects of the original Peggle were prominent in reviews of Peggle Nights, such as its "balanced" gameplay, level design, addictive nature, and vibrant presentation. The fact of Peggle Nights being simply the same Peggle game with different levels and added features was praised by some reviewers and lukewarmly-thought-of by others. PopMatters writer Thomas Cross was concerned that the lack of newness wouldn't help the Peggle series' chances of staying relevant, while Gamezebo suggested gamers would be "downright disappointed" if they expected more.

Michael Scarpelli of Inside Mac Games called Peggle Nights's levels "far more intricate than in the original Peggle. There are moving pieces and barriers abound and there are a far greater percentage of levels that will take a handful of tries to pass." On the other hand, Joe Blyth of Eurogamer called the levels "a little disappointing," particularly criticizing the "inaccessible boxiness" of the Renfield stages. However, he did praise the character of Marina and her stages. The ace awards were also honored by reviewers, including Scarpelli who reasoned they added replay value to Peggle Nights.

The dream aspect of the game "makes for some great new background art, and some opportunities for quirky humor as well, according to Game Revolution; and the dreams were "sweet and unpredictable," in Blyth's opinion. A couple of reviewers particularly spotlighted Tula's story for its emotional engagement, Steve Hogarty of GamesRadar+ writing that "few games approach such subject matter, and fewer still with such gravitas." Scarpelli praised the dream concept for giving a variety of backgrounds that added a "particular flair" to the peg placement. However, Thomas found the story "meaningless" to the experience, and Steve Hogarty of GamesRadar+ felt it hindered the gameplay's quality: "Pegs are sculpted more closely around background artwork, and the art itself threads narrative through the progression of levels."
