= Peggle (series) =

Video game series

- Genre: Puzzle
- Developer: PopCap Games
- Publishers: PopCap Games (2007–2011); Electronic Arts (2011–present)
- Platforms: Microsoft Windows macOS; Windows Mobile; Java ME; BREW; Nintendo DS; Xbox 360; PlayStation 3 iOS; Zeebo; Android; Xbox One; PlayStation 4 Web browser
- First release: Peggle; February 27, 2007
- Latest release: Peggle Blast HD; March 31, 2020
- Spin-offs: Peggle Extreme, Peggle: World of Warcraft Edition, Peggle Blast

Peggle is a series of casual puzzle video games created by PopCap Games, a subsidiary of Electronic Arts. Loosely based on Pachinko, Peggle was released for Microsoft Windows and macOS in 2007, initially receiving poor sales. Two sequels later followed: Peggle Nights (2008) and Peggle 2 (2013) while four spinoffs were released: Peggle Extreme (2007), Peggle: Dual Shot (2009), Peggle: World of Warcraft Edition (2009), and Peggle Blast (2014). The series follows Bjorn Unicorn, headmaster of the Peggle Institute, taking the player under tutelage alongside various Peggle masters.

Since its original release, the Peggle franchise has been downloaded more than 50 million times. (Note: According to The Washington Post, the actual number of purchases is a subset of a figure that PopCap declined to disclose.)

== History ==
Release timeline
2007	Peggle
2007	Peggle Extreme
2008	Peggle Nights
2009	Peggle: Dual Shot
2009	Peggle: World of Warcraft Edition
2010–2012
2013	Peggle 2
2014	Peggle Blast
2015–2019
2020	Peggle Blast HD

=== Main series ===
==== Peggle ====
Sukhbir Sidhub originally envisioned Peggle after being inspired by pachinko machines. Joining PopCap Games in 2002, Sidhub discussed with co-founder Jason Kapalka about ideas of casual games to develop. Years later, a developer at PopCap was working on a 2D physics engine, and the idea of a pachinko-based game was brought up again by Sidhub. Prototypes of a game were developed in a three-to-four month span, with Sidhub's being more luck based while programmer Brain Rothstein created more skill based prototypes. Lead artist Walter Wilson, background artist Marcia Borderick and a second programmer, Eric Tams, later joined the project, being developed for two years. Sidhub and his team faced scrutiny from other developers at PopCap, challenging him to add more player interaction to the game. The game went through multiple creative processes during its development. Some placeholders, including its usage of classical music, Bjorn the Unicorn, and rainbows ended up being permanent on the final version of the game. During an interview with PC Gamer, Kapalka shared that the original title of Peggle was Thunderball, based on the theme of Thor, and much darker in theme in contrast with the final product. Wanting a brighter theme, Wilson created art in his own theme. The Thunderball name continued to be used during its development until it was changed to Pego. The name was later changed again to Peggle, due to its resemblance to Electronic Arts' web-based service Pogo, years before PopCap became a subsidiary of EA.

On February 27, 2007, Peggle was released for Windows. Initially underperforming in sales, PopCap developed special levels to be included with Valve's The Orange Box, later released in 2007, after learning their employees often played Peggle in their offices. Unsure if the collaboration would be a success, Kapalka and others at PopCap were worried of critical reviews from players of The Orange Box. Peggle's association with the Half-Life franchise ultimately bolstered its sales, bringing in attention from players that would "never be caught dead playing a game with unicorns and rainbows". On Metacritic, the PC version of Peggle received "generally favorable" reviews based on a score of 85. The game was later ported to a series of different platforms, including Mac OS X (2007), iPod (2007), Xbox 360 (2009), PlayStation 3 (2009), iOS (2009), and Android (2011). The Xbox 360 version of Peggle received the most reviews by critics, garnishing "generally favorable" reviews on Metacritic with a score of 89, while its PlayStation 3 version was met with "universal acclaim" with a score of 91 based on 10 critic reviews.

==== Peggle Nights ====
On September 16, 2008, PopCap released Peggle Nights, the second installment in the Peggle franchise. Little was mentioned of the game's development other than a brief mention by Kapalka in a 2008 interview, describing it as a "pretty straight-forward sequel". Marketed then as a "follow-up" to the initial Peggle video game, gameplay remained largely unchanged with IGN describing it as the "much-anticipated follow-up". Alongside the ten original masters, a new Peggle master Marina, an electric squid, was added, for a total of 60 levels and 60 challenge levels. Peggle Nights added more style shots, including "Off the Wall" and "Double Long Shot". Peggle Nights received "generally favorable" reviews based on a score of 76 from Metacritic, though its dream-like storyline and similarity to the original garnered mixed responses. In 2009, it was released to Xbox 360, as an expansion pack to the original Peggle video game.

==== Peggle 2 ====
Ideas of a third installment of Peggle began in 2011, around the time Electronic Arts acquired PopCap Games. Development of Peggle 2 began in spring of 2012, originally planned as a timed exclusive for the Xbox One. Originally announced during the E3 2013 press conference by PopCap co-founder John Vechey, the announcement became an internet meme due to its brief announcement, Vechey jumping into the air and lack of applause from the audience. Originally scheduled for release on November 22, 2013, the release of Peggle 2 was delayed to December 9, 2013. Featuring a visual overhaul, Bjorn Unicorn originally was the only Peggle master to return as a playable character from the previous games. Four new masters were introduced to the game, with each master having a set of ten levels and ten trial mode levels. Unlike previous games, Peggle 2 featured additional downloadable content. PopCap announced the release of Peggle 2's first DLC, Windy's Master Pack, which introduced a new master, Windy the Fairy, adding ten more levels and ten more trial levels. On May 7, 2014, Peggle 2 was released to Xbox 360, ending its timed exclusive with the Xbox One. On June 24, PopCap released the second DLC for Peggle 2, the Jimmy Lightning Master Pack. The DLC featured a return of Jimmy Lightning from the original Peggle video game, adding ten new levels and ten trial levels. A PlayStation 4 version of Peggle 2 was later released in October of that year. The Xbox One version of Peggle 2 was "generally favorable" from critic reviews with a score of 77 from Metacritic while the PlayStation 4 version received "mixed or average" reviews, with a score of 72. While many critics lauded its artwork and real-time music, some found that Peggle 2 had "nothing really new or innovative" compared to its predecessors while mentioning the lack of a leaderboard. Brett Molina of USA Today added that Peggle 2's usage of the Kinect to play using gestures and voice commands "fe[lt] like a novelty." Matt Kamen of The Guardian noted how often the game would crash when Peggle 2 first launched. PopCap later added multiplayer mode and leaderboards via a free update in 2014.

=== Spinoffs ===
PopCap released Peggle Extreme, a spinoff game featuring the levels showcased and made specifically for The Orange Box, on September 11, 2007. In 2009, PopCap released Peggle: Dual Shot, which was developed by Q Entertainment for Nintendo DS. The game is a compilation including content from both Peggle and Peggle Nights. PopCap later released an addon for World of Warcraft, Peggle: World of Warcraft Edition. Similar to Peggle Extreme, levels and art are based on the Warcraft universe.

In 2014, seven months after the launch of Peggle 2, Electronic Arts teased that PopCap was "working another Peggle title". A free-to-play version of a new Peggle game under development was released initially in Singapore and New Zealand. In December 2014, almost a year after the release of Peggle 2, Peggle Blast was released to mobile devices. The game features a story of fighting against Fnord Unicorn, Bjorn's evil brother who wants the heart of Peggle for himself. Peggle Blast was met with "mixed or average reviews", with a score of 52 on Metacritic, the lowest in the franchise. While its graphics were praised from critics, many disapproved of its in-app purchasing, with Nadia Oxford writing for Gamezebo stating "EA has us pegged for suckers". In 2020, Peggle Blast was remastered and released to Pogo.com as Peggle Blast HD.

== Impact and legacy ==
Peggle was nominated for the 2007 Game Developers Choice Awards for "Best Handheld Game" (iPod), "Best Downloadable Game" and for the "Innovation" awards. In a 2007 PC Gamer Magazine list, Peggle was ranked at number 40. In 2012, the British Academy Video Games Awards (BAFTA) named Peggle's mobile port as "the best game in its Mobile and Handheld category." The Peggle franchise has gone on to win awards for its orchestral soundtracks, including "Best Audio in a Casual/Indie/Social Game" and "Best Interactive Score" at the 12th Game Audio Network Guild Awards. During GDC 2014, composer Guy Whitmore spoke about how he designed and recorded real time music for Peggle 2. In 2015, Peggle Blast won "Best Handheld Audio" and "Best Music in a Casual/Social Game" at the 13th Game Audio Network Guild Awards.

Many critics have considered Peggle to be an addictive game, with NBC News describing "The term 'casual game' is nothing if not a misnomer, because while playing PopCap's Peggle—you are anything but relaxed." In 2008, Forbes described casual games "like Tetris and Peggle similarly lull users into 'just a few more minutes' stupors."

In 2009, PopCap founded a study at East Carolina University, finding that casual games such as Peggle, Bejeweled and Bookworm Adventures help to reduce symptoms of anxiety and depression in people.

In March 2025, GameRant listed Peggle 2 as the seventh best Xbox Live Arcade game.
