= Friday the 13th: Killer Puzzle =

2018 video game

- Developer: Blue Wizard Digital
- Publisher: Blue Wizard Digital
- Director: Jason Kapalka
- Producer: Nate Schmold
- Programmers: Matthew Sieber; Matthew Miller
- Artists: Warren Heise; Jessi Ross; Dan Lam; Nate Schmold
- Composer: Nate Schmold
- Series: Friday the 13th
- Engine: Unity
- Platforms: iOS; Android; Steam; Nintendo Switch; PlayStation 4; Xbox One
- Release: NA: January 20, 2018; WW: April 13, 2018
- Genres: Horror; Puzzle game
- Mode: Single-player

Friday the 13th: Killer Puzzle is a 2018 horror puzzle video game for iOS, Android, Steam, Nintendo Switch, PlayStation 4 and Xbox One developed by Blue Wizard Digital. The game was released on January 20, 2018, in the US and April 13 worldwide. It is the fourth official video game based on the Friday the 13th franchise.

Players control Jason Voorhees by sliding him around an isometric puzzle to attack victims directly or indirectly, in "Kill Scenes". There are multiple episodes, ranging from campgrounds to outer space.

The game won iOS app of the week on January 26, 2018.
