= The Variable =

- Lost episode
- Jack Shepard, Kate Austen and Daniel Faraday are leaving to visit the "Others"
- Episode no.: Season 5 Episode 14
- Directed by: Paul Edwards
- Written by: Edward Kitsis; Adam Horowitz
- Production code: 514
- Original air date: April 29, 2009
- Running time: 43 minutes

Guest appearances
- Nestor Carbonell as Richard Alpert; Sonya Walger as Penny Widmore; Alan Dale as Charles Widmore; François Chau as Dr. Pierre Chang; Fionnula Flanagan as Eloise Hawking; Patrick Fischler as Phil; Eric Lange as Stuart Radzinsky; Sarah Farooqui as Theresa Spencer; Alice Evans as Young Eloise Hawking; Wendy Pearson as Doctor; Todd Coolidge as Paramedic; Peggy Anne Siegmund as Caroline; Jennifer Sojot as Nurse; Spencer Allyn as Young Daniel Faraday; Michael Dempsey as Tony; Maya Henssens as Young Charlotte Lewis; Ariston Green as Workman; Marvin DeFreitas as Charlie Hume; Brad Berryhill as Eric

Episode chronology
← Previous "Some Like It Hoth"	Next → "Follow the Leader"
- Lost season 5

"The Variable" is the 14th television episode of the fifth season of Lost, and the 100th episode overall. It originally aired on the American Broadcasting Company (ABC) in the United States on April 29, 2009. The hundredth episode milestone was celebrated by cast and crew on location in Hawaii. In the episode, Daniel Faraday (Jeremy Davies) returns to the Island in order to warn the inhabitants of a catastrophe involving the DHARMA Initiative research station the Swan. Jack (Matthew Fox), Kate (Evangeline Lilly) and Daniel begin a fight with DHARMA, leading DHARMA to go after Sawyer (Josh Holloway) and Juliet (Elizabeth Mitchell). In flashbacks, Daniel's relationship with his parents, Eloise Hawking (Fionnula Flanagan) and Charles Widmore (Alan Dale), is shown.

The episode was written by executive producers Edward Kitsis and Adam Horowitz and directed by Paul Edwards. It serves as a companion piece to the season four episode "The Constant", another episode that heavily features the character Daniel, and the third Lost episode to deal directly with the concept of time travel. Since airing, the episode has received generally positive reviews from television critics, mostly complimenting Davies's performance.

== Plot ==
=== Flashbacks ===
At a young age, Eloise asks Daniel if he knows what destiny is and then tells him that he has a special gift — his brilliant mind — and that his destiny relies on this. After Daniel graduates from Oxford University, Eloise gives him a new journal as a gift and again reminds him of his destiny. Meanwhile, Daniel has received an enormous research grant from Charles. Years later, following the crash of Flight 815, Daniel has suffered severe psychological effects from performing experiments on himself; he has lost his mental acuity, and now lives with a caretaker. While watching the news coverage of the discovery of the Flight 815 wreckage in the Sunda Trench, Daniel is visited by Charles, who tells him that he faked the found wreckage and that the real plane actually landed on the island. Charles invites Daniel to go to the island, which Charles claims will cure his psychological problems. Eloise later visits Daniel and further encourages him to go to the island.

=== 1977 ===
Following the events of the previous episode, "Some Like It Hoth", Daniel has returned to the island, having spent three years in Ann Arbor, Michigan, conducting research for the Dharma Initiative. He has returned because Jack, Kate and Hurley (Jorge Garcia) have managed to travel back in time and become part of the Initiative. After learning from Jack that they were sent to the island by Daniel's mother, Eloise (younger: Alice Evans; older: Fionnula Flanagan), Daniel visits Dr. Pierre Chang (François Chau) at the Orchid station (as seen in "Because You Left") and warns him of a catastrophic event that is to occur at the Swan station in six hours. Dr. Chang does not believe Daniel when he says that he is from the future, and Miles (Ken Leung) does not confirm Dan's story, even after Daniel informs Dr. Chang that Miles is his son from the future.

At the Barracks, Sawyer, Juliet, Jin (Daniel Dae Kim), Hurley and Miles decide that they will flee to the survivors' original beach, abandoning Dharma. But Kate, Jack and Daniel decide to visit the island's native population, the "Others", and get help to prevent the impending disaster. They arouse suspicion from Dharma's head of research, Radzinsky (Eric Lange), while trying to steal weapons, and a gun fight ensues. The survivors are able to escape; however, Radzinsky brings his team to Sawyer and Juliet's house, where they find Dharma member Phil (Patrick Fischler) tied up. Meanwhile, Daniel explains to Jack and Kate that he intends to detonate the hydrogen bomb that had been buried on the island in 1954 in order to prevent the construction of the Swan, which in turn will ensure that Oceanic Flight 815 never crashes on the island, which means it never becomes visible to Widmore's team, so he never sends the freighter which brings himself and Charlotte, therefore Charlotte does not die. Daniel enters the Others' camp with his gun drawn and demands that Richard Alpert (Nestor Carbonell) take him to see Eloise; Eloise shoots Daniel in the back as they argue, to Richard's disapproval. As he dies, Daniel tells Eloise that he is her son, and comments that she (referring to her older self) knew he was going to die on the island and sent him anyway.

=== 2007 ===
Following the events of "Dead is Dead", Desmond (Henry Ian Cusick) is brought to a hospital, having been shot by Ben (Michael Emerson). While waiting, his wife Penny (Sonya Walger) is visited by Eloise, who apologizes for involving Desmond in everything that has happened. Penny later visits Desmond, who is expected to make a full recovery. Charles, who is also Daniel's father, speaks with Eloise outside the hospital, but does not visit his daughter.

== Production ==
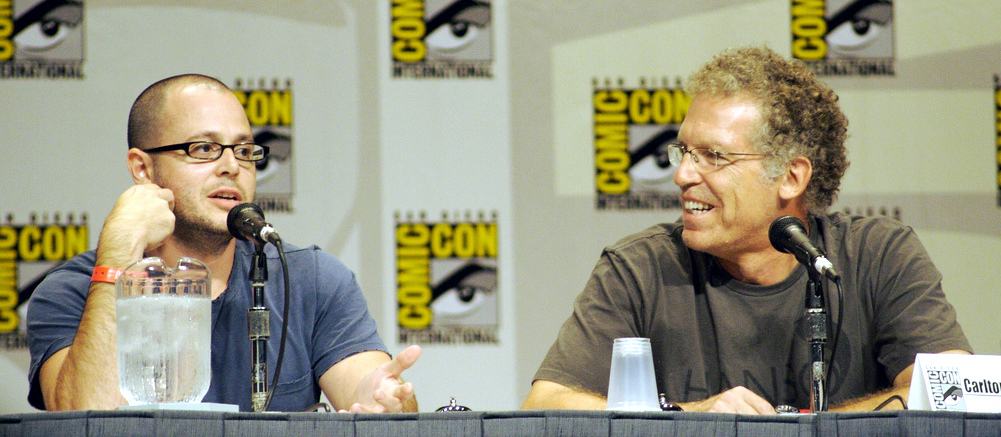
Damon Lindelof and Carlton Cuse, the show runners of Lost

"The Variable" was written by Edward Kitsis and Adam Horowitz and directed by Paul Edwards. Like most season five episodes, it features elements of time travel. It serves as a companion piece to the season four episode "The Constant", another episode that heavily features the character Daniel, and the third Lost episode to deal directly with the concept of time travel after "Flashes Before Your Eyes" from the third season and "The Constant" from the fourth season. In "The Constant", Desmond and Sayid (Naveen Andrews) are on their way off the island when their helicopter hits turbulence, causing Desmond's 1996 consciousness to take over his 2004 body and switch uncontrollably between 1996 and 2004. Lost show runner Damon Lindelof said the fifth season of the show has "flung major characters across decades, leaving them — and the audience — feverishly attempting to keep events straight and the end game in sight." In "The Variable", the viewers would get a few more pieces of the puzzle, Lindelof said, and added: "We're not promising any big whiz-bang flash pyrotechnics, but it does serve as a companion piece to another memorable episode, last season's 'The Constant', in which Desmond endured vicious, turbulence-caused side effects from traveling in time." Lindelof also commented that the fifth season is about the rules of time travel as explained by Daniel, and said, "We've never done a flashback story for Daniel, so he's very mysterious. Some of those mysteries will be answered in this episode." Since Lindelof and his show runner partner Carlton Cuse wrote "The Constant", they thought the "sister episode" should be written by someone other than them, which led to Kitsis and Horowitz writing it. The two show runners were pleased with the outcome of the episode. Cuse thought it was one of the best episodes of the season.

The episode features the death of Jeremy Davies' character Daniel Faraday. Daniel was introduced in the fourth season and was originally intended to be a minor character only. However, his quiet demeanor and seemingly good heart made him a favorite with the fans, so Lindelof and Cuse decided to expand Daniel's role, which has led to him being a key player in Lost's eventual resolution. In response to Daniel's death, Cuse said, "It was an incredibly painful thing to kill this beloved character, but we feel that’s what this show has to do. His death is kind of the culminating event in the entire season. It really ends one chapter and commences the start of the final chapter of the entire series." Once the show runners explained that to Davies, he was saddened that his full-time status on Lost was coming to an end, but put the story "above his own personal self". Damon seconded Carlton's emotions, adding that Jeremy took the news well: "When Carlton and I called Jeremy to explain what was going to be happening with Daniel, we’ve never had a more awesome exit interview with somebody on the show. For us, Daniel really was the cornerstone of the fifth season – he really shined. I can’t imagine what Season 5 would have looked like without Jeremy Davies. When you think about all the crazy stuff that had to come out of that guy’s mouth, for him to be as interesting and emotional and poetic as he was is really extraordinary." The cast of the show said Davies would be missed, though he may not be done with Lost — Carlton commented that Jeremy's "full-time" status was over, but dead characters have been known to reappear on the show. Michael Emerson, who plays Ben, said Davies was "a great sensitive guy who got deep into his character, he really lived it."

"The Variable" was the hundredth episode of the show to be produced and aired on television. Josh Holloway, who plays the role of Sawyer, said, "Just statistically speaking, to hit a hundred episodes doesn't happen very often, especially on a show where everyone is saying 'Lost on an island? What are you gonna do after a season or two?', so the fact that we've lasted not only a season or two but flourishing still at this time... it's shocking... it's amazing to me." In an interview with The News & Observer, Lindelof recalled meeting with the ABC executives in 2004 to pitch the idea of a plane crash and survivors stranded on an island full of mystery and danger. When Lindelof was asked by the executives where the Lost saga would stand in the future, he replied, "We're probably not going to get past episode thirteen. Let's all be honest about that up front." Lindelof added that if he had "traveled back in time to tell myself after that meeting that we were going to make it to a hundred and still have a season beyond that, I would have laughed in my face." The hundredth episode milestone was celebrated by the cast and crew on location in Oahu, Hawaii. Duff Goldman and his crew from the Food Network's American television show Ace of Cakes made a special Lost cake for the party to commemorate the milestone. The cake featured replicas of a Dharma beer bottles, the computer from the Swan station, a suitcase and a miniature Oceanic Flight 815. The Ace of Cakes episode ("LOST in Hawaii") featuring the making of the cake aired on the Food Network in the United States on May 9, 2009.

== Reception ==
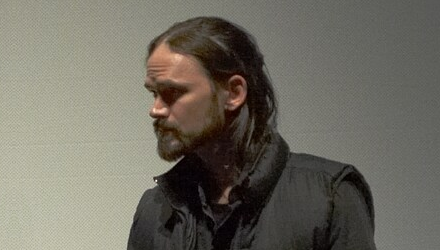
Jeremy Davies, who portrays Daniel, received praise for his acting in the episode.

"The Variable" was watched live or recorded and watched within five hours of broadcast by 8.8 million viewers in the United States, achieving a 3.9/10 in the coveted adults aged eighteen to forty-nine demographic. Lost was that Wednesday's number one scripted television show in the aforementioned demographic for its thirteenth straight original telecast. In Australia, the episode was watched by 296,000 people, ranking forty-sixth for the night.

Since airing, the episode has received generally positive reviews from television critics, mostly complimenting Davies's performance as Daniel. Chris Carabott of IGN commented that if this is the last appearance of Davies on Lost, which he "somehow" doubts, then, "I'm glad he had the opportunity to leave on such a strong note. He delivers in some really great, emotional, moments this week – especially in the scenes in which he is suffering from memory deterioration. I've become a huge fan of Davies over the course of the last couple of years thanks to his performance on this show." Rachel Dovey of Paste said the episode revealed "a whole different" side of Daniel: "We've oscillated before about the true nature of the physicist, whether it's good or evil [...] We decided he's mostly a decent guy, barring the whole experimenting-on-his-girlfriend-then-running-away-when-her-brain-turned-to-mush thing. In the past, he's just seemed lost and confused, and, since he has those big, earnest puppy eyes, we decided to forgive him. But 'The Variable' showed us the dynamic at the heart of Daniel's stuttering vulnerability. Like all broken superheroes and Freudian beings, the man has mommy issues. This week we dove inside the dynamic between Daniel and his mother growing up."

Adam Sweeney of Film School Rejects was positive about the episode, "For anyone who has been complaining that Lost had been too slow lately, here you go. Those who watched 'The Variable' saw more action than (basketball player) Wilt Chamberlain. They, and by they I mean we, also got a clear explanation of how the islanders got onto the island. You wanted answers, you got them." Sweeney also believed Davies's acting was the "high point" of the episode. David Oliver of CHUD.com gave the episode an 8.6 rating out of 10, and commented that it was a "good" episode, though he was "bummed" to see Daniel go. Oliver also said that while the episode did "very little" to advance the season storyline significantly, there were "some significant" developments and revelations in it. TV Verdict's Stephen Lackey said the episode was "fast paced" and featured "one exciting twist after another".

The episode also received some criticism. Dan Compora of Airlock Alpha said after a run of "several strong" episodes, Lost "has slipped into mediocrity. While none of the recent episodes have been bad, they haven't been anything special. For a hundredth episode, average simply isn't good enough. While the shooting of Daniel at the end was stunning, I expected something much more from the rest of the episode than learning the identity of Daniel's parents." A reviewer for TVoholic.com thought the episode was good, though not as good as "The Constant", and he thought "it came with lots of answers and references to past episodes from this season and the ones before it, making it all the more exciting." The reviewer would, however, have "loved any sort of explanation as to why [Daniel] changed his mind about changing the past or how he thought this could work. There must have been something that made Daniel think this was possible, but he was in such a rush that he never took care to explain." Jon Lachonis of TVOvermind said that as an internal character piece, "The Variable" was not "so much a great ending for Daniel. We brushed up against many key events and people – Theresa, Daniel’s ‘nurse’, and the Widmore and Eloise parental connection, etc. – but these forays into the geniuses’ past events were more to thread Daniel through the plot than to establish their connection to who Daniel truly was."
