= Peggle 2 =

2013 video game

- Xbox One cover art
- Developer: PopCap Games
- Publisher: Electronic Arts
- Producer: Jared Neuss
- Artist: Drew Robertson
- Composer: Guy Whitmore
- Series: Peggle
- Platforms: Xbox One; Xbox 360; PlayStation 4
- Release: Xbox One; December 9, 2013; Xbox 360; May 7, 2014; PlayStation 4 October 14, 2014
- Genre: Puzzle
- Modes: Single-player, multiplayer

Peggle 2 is a casual puzzle video game developed by PopCap Games and published by Electronic Arts. It is the official sequel to Peggle (2007), although a previous follow-up to the PC game was released in 2008. In production since 2012, Peggle 2 was announced during the E3 2013 press conference and also as a timed exclusive for the Xbox One. Although the gameplay mechanics remain mostly the same, Peggle 2 features a different set of masters, with Bjorn Unicorn and Jimmy Lightning (as a DLC) as the only returning members among a set of five other new ones. An Xbox 360 version of the game was released on May 7, 2014, as well as a PlayStation 4 version on October 14, 2014.

Critically, Peggle 2 was praised for its new masters and the implementation of them; its vibrant visual, soundtrack, and the addition of trial levels and challenges. However, it was also criticized for not having enough facets that made it truly different from its predecessors.

== Gameplay ==
A screenshot of gameplay in Peggle 2, featuring Bjorn Unicorn using his magic power Super Guide

The goal of Peggle 2 is to clear all 25 orange pegs from the board with 10 balls to shoot from with a cannon at the top of the screen. 72 blue pegs, two green pegs and one purple peg which moves on each shot are randomly placed on the board. With the green peg, it enables the "masters'" power on next shot or even on current shot. The game uses a multiplier feature which multiplies the players score by the number of pegs that the player hits. The more orange pegs are hit, the higher the multiplier (stylized as "multiplizer" in-game), the more points are earned. The multiplizer starts at "x1" and will go to "x2", "x3", "x5", and lastly "x10". Orange pegs are worth 10x the points of blue pegs, and purples are 50x the worth of blue pegs.

At the bottom of the board, a free ball bucket is provided and if the ball falls into the bucket, the player is given a free ball back. Players can also earn a free ball from getting a score of 25,000 (one free ball), 75,000 (two free balls), or 125,000 (three free balls) within one shot. Green pegs are worth the same as a blue peg in points. Once all 25 orange pegs are cleared, players will achieve "Extreme Fever", which gives the player five "Fever buckets" and give the player a score of either 10,000 (on the far left and right), 50,000 (between the 100,000 bucket and 50,000), or 100,000 (center of board). Pegs are worth x20 during Fever. If leftover balls are present on the "Balljector", the cannon will fire them and give the player an additional 10,000 points.

Trial Mode is a set of levels made to reach the trial goal. Such trial levels include getting above a certain score, below a certain score, style shot levels, clearing additional orange pegs on the board, and more. Gameplay for trial mode is about the same as normal game mode, but you must meet the trial requirements. In multiplayer mode, players can play online with other users or chose a local match. Online "peg parties" can go up to four players while local gameplay is two players. The host of the game can choose the board map, set the timer, the number of orange pegs, number of green pegs, and number of rounds. The goal is the same as normal game mode, but if a player fails to hit one orange peg in a shot, 25% of their total points are removed.

== Development ==
=== Background ===
Created by PopCap Games out of studio director Sukhbir Sidhu's love for pachinko machines, Peggle was first released on February 27, 2007, on PC. While originally selling poorly, sales of the game skyrocketed following the inclusion of Peggle Extreme on the video game software The Orange Box (2007), and it went on to garner 50 million downloads by 2009. Peggle was also critically acclaimed, later had versions on other platforms such as Xbox Live Arcade and iOS that were also commercial hits, and was nominated for several Game Developers Choice Awards and Interactive Achievement Award.

More than a year later, PopCap released what was marketed as a follow-up to Peggle (2007), Peggle Nights (2008). While critically acclaimed and featuring new levels and additional mechanics, most of the gameplay and presentation remained the same, a fact that garnered mixed responses from critics and made a Gamezebo reviewer categorize it as "more like an expansion pack." According to a Polygon feature about the making of Peggle 2, it was incredibly difficult to make a good Peggle sequel due to having to produce a new product while keeping the original's "secret sauce."

PopCap started conceiving Peggle 2 in 2011, and it was planned to be produced and released for the Xbox One before the console was issued. Several debates by PopCap staff about how Peggle 2 would be released delayed its production, including (if it was released as a freemium game) how the inclusion of microtransactions would alter the game's design, whether to release on all platforms in one day, and whether there should be differences between ports of the game.

=== Art and design ===
Production of Peggle 2 began in the spring of 2012. Microsoft partnered with Electronic Arts to develop Peggle 2 as a timed exclusive for the release of the Xbox One console. For Peggle 2, lead artist Drew Robertson went for a "beautiful" look, a decision inspired by listening to some of the game's orchestral pieces that were completed before art production began. He described the stylistic influences as a mixture of Disney films and campy science fiction flicks; the power-ups, in particular, were inspired by traits of the characters in this type of media, such as the Yeti's dancing being based on the dancing hippo from Fantasia (1940) and Luna's power-up being inspired by Lydia from Beetlejuice (1989). The art team, although not working with any story, also went for a "sense of progression" and "sort of logic" with the look of each level.

Only one Peggle master was taken from the original game, the unicorn Bjorn. For conceiving the other masters that had "soul" to them, Robertson took pictures of cryptids and other fantastical creatures and taped them on a studio room wall; using these, music and sounds from the audio team, a hidden backstory made up by Robertson about magical beings with powers that can release happiness to the world via pegs, the artists "dream[t]" new characters. Luna was originally meant to be the fourth master, but after realizing her power-up had the most difficult learning curve, she was chosen as the last master.

Sylvain Dubrofsky, a worker at Harmonix who admitted to Peggle being his favorite PopCap game, was hired as lead level designer for Peggle 2 in September 2012. With no experience making a Peggle map before, he studied levels of previous Peggle games for weeks before beginning the level designs. As he described one major lesson in creating the levels, "You have to diagonally stagger the pegs if you want them to fall and keep bouncing. Big drains where the ball just falls and doesn't bounce back up are not fun." Steve Notley, who worked on prior Peggle games, also helped Dubrofsky with the levels in Peggle 2.

The designers kept in mind the mixture of skill and luck that defined Peggle's difficulty when creating additional mechanics, including the aiming feature and new power-ups. The aimer was originally much longer than the final product, but it "made the game more of a skill-based game, because you could pick off pegs at the bottom and go right to the bucket," explained Dubrofsky. One level had been finished for months but was poorly received in test plays, Dubrofsky reasoning that it was "too random," "difficult and not fun" explained Dubrofsky and lead producer Jared Neuss; near the end of production of Peggle 2, Dubrofsky suggested to add two bumpers to the map, which, according to Neuss, instantly made it the "most fun level in the entire game." PopCap used the level to showcase Peggle 2 at PAX following this change.

=== Audio ===
Peggle 2 (Original Game Soundtrack)

Soundtrack album by EA Games Soundtrack
- Released: April 22, 2014
- Recorded: 2012–2013
- Genres: Classical; classical crossover; electronic
- Length: 50:21
- Label: Electronic Arts Music
- Producers: Guy Whitmore; Jonathan Watkins; Steve Schnur

Composition and production of Peggle 2's score started at an early prototype in 2012 and lasted for two years. The orchestra was recorded by the Northwest Symphony Orchestra, German production company Dynamedion and a Seattle-based children's choir; while the "fever" tracks were recorded in Germany, the other pieces were tracked at Studio X in Seattle, Washington. Peggle 2's music is based on and uses remixes of classical orchestral music, such as "Morning Mood", "Ode to Joy", "William Tell Overture", "Dance of the Hours", "1812 Overture", "In the Hall of the Mountain King", "Hallelujah" and "The Barber of Seville" as well as "Flight of the Bumblebee". Each master has their own gameplay music, sound effects, and Fever songs. On Trial Mode, "remixes" of the masters theme are played and created by scntfc and Whitmore. A total of 18 songs are in the official soundtrack. The Peggle franchise has won multiple awards for its music.

Composer Guy Whitmore want to prove that it was possible to make an interactive orchestral score; to do this, the instruments were recorded separately playing different phrases. In order for each of the orchestral stems and sound effects to match the gameplay in real time, the producers placed them in the engine Wwise for the programmers to determine which audio file would play at specific moments. Unlike previous Peggle titles, Peggle 2 has different fever music for each master; the audio team made the fever tracks with the idea of them satisfying the user. As audio lead Jaclyn Shumate explained, "If you get the highest possible score, it'll reach that super satisfying pitch. You should just keep trying to get it and it'll feel really good. It's about controlling what the user is experiencing."

== Release ==
Peggle 2 was announced by PopCap co-founder John Vechey at E3 2013 and was considered one of the most humorous moments of the entire conference. After announcing Plants vs. Zombies: Garden Warfare, Vechey announced they had one last thing to show. He then yelled "Peggle 2!", leapt into the air, and immediately left the stage upon landing. Videos and remixes of the announcement, and the subsequent lack of applause, became hits on YouTube.

The game was set to release the same day as the Xbox One on November 22, 2013; however, the game was delayed to December 9, 2013. On May 7, 2014, Peggle 2 was released on the Xbox 360 platform, ending its time exclusive on the Xbox One. On August 30, 2014, PopCap Games announced on the official Peggle Twitter account that Peggle 2 would be released on the PlayStation 4. Peggle 2 was released to PlayStation 4 on October 14, 2014.

On February 7, 2023, Peggle 2 was removed from the Xbox 360 Marketplace.

== Downloadable content and updates ==
Peggle 2 for Xbox One and PlayStation 4 feature downloadable content (DLC). The duel mode was added by PopCap via a free update.

Released on April 22, 2014, the "Windy the Fairy Master Pack" adds a new master to Peggle 2. Windy the Fairy is a bird fairy whose magical powerup is Fairy Flock. The Fairy Flock power turns blue pegs into a purple peg, which is 50x worth more in score than the blue peg. Along with the master, ten new levels and trials, three new achievements, and 30 objectives are featured in the pack. The "Jimmy Lightning Master Pack" was issued on June 24, 2014, and adds master Jimmy Lightning from the original Peggle. His multiball power now spawns two additional balls instead of one. Along with the master, ten new levels and trials, three new achievements, 30 objectives, and three unlockable costumes.

- "Plants vs. Zombies: Garden Warfare Costume Pack": This costume pack adds one new costume for each Peggle master (including the two DLC masters). Each costume represents a character from the game Plants vs. Zombies: Garden Warfare.
- "Shiver Me Timbers Costume Pack": This costume pack adds one new costume for each Peggle master (including the two DLC masters). Each character's costume is in a pirate-like theme.
- "Eerie Attire Costume Pack": A PlayStation 4 exclusive, this costume pack adds one new costume for each Peggle master, including the two DLC masters. Each character's costume represents an eerie attire from the Gravely Grove.

== Reception ==
=== Critical response ===
Reception

Aggregate scores
Aggregator	Score
GameRankings	76.96%
Metacritic	(XONE) 77/100 (PS4) 72/100

Review scores
Publication	Score
Destructoid	8/10
Edge	7/10
Electronic Gaming Monthly	7.5/10
Eurogamer	7/10
Game Informer	8/10
GameRevolution	4/5
GameSpot	8/10
GamesRadar+	3.5/5
GameZone	9/10
IGN	9/10
Joystiq	3.5/5
Official Xbox Magazine (UK)	8/10
Polygon	8/10
Digital Spy	3/5
Hardcore Gamer	4/5

In general, critics positively covered Peggle 2 but criticized its lack of significantly new aspects, (Note: Attributed to multiple sources:) with Game Informer journalist Andrew Reiner describing it as "more like a level pack than a true sequel". In terms of gameplay, IGN critic Ryan Caffrey found it just as good as the previous Peggle games but was a bit dismayed with the levels not having as many "crazy gimmicks and wild themes". In a favorable review, Game Revolution found Peggle 2 the wrong type of game for its console-launch price: "Replaying boards over and over again for the perfect score or binging through the entire campaign of puzzles in one sitting can leave you feeling numb to PopCap's incessant celebration." Eurogamer's Christian Donlan and GameZone's Mike Splechta noted frame-rate issues, Splechta also panning the game's Kinect mode which was criticized for being "rather pointless".

The board challenges and trial levels were praised for their difficulty and adding replay value and variety to Peggle 2. (Note: Attributed to multiple sources:) Game Revolution stated it made the game "an excellent chaser for Xbox One's more hardcore experiences", and Edge found the trial levels "a delightful change of pace: you know there's a solution, that what it tells you to do is possible, and as such they require a lot more thought than the fire-and-forget nature of traditional Peggle". The multiplayer mode was well-received but also faulted by reviewers for its sparsity, lagging issues, and (most commonly) not allowing local play. (Note: Attributed to multiple sources:) Caffrey disliked the removal of the two-player Duel mode of the previous games, and Reiner criticized the multiplayer mode for occasionally dropping the player in the middle of online rounds where he's "forced to play the majority of the game in a losing position until a new one starts". The automatic saving of clips of shots in the Xbox One was heavily criticized for overdriving the GameDVR system. (Note: Attributed to multiple sources:) Caffrey described the PlayStation 4 port as better than the Xbox One version for having less overscan issues and a manual clip-saving feature, where the automatic saving of clips in the Xbox One version overdrove the GameDVR system; in addition, he appreciated the game's use of the DualShock 4's light bar for being "very much in the spirit of Peggle's joyous attitude."

The addition of presence and animation to the masters was praised by several critics. (Note: Attributed to multiple sources:) Mark Walton of GameSpot called their reactions "absolutely hilarious", Destructoid's Chris Carter "a really simple thing that made me smile constantly, and made each Master more endearing". Caffrey cheerfully commented on the increased screen time and "extra personality" of the new masters, placing Jeffrey and Gnorman's power-ups as highlight; however, he was disappointed with the little number of playable masters and the rejection of characters from previous games. Joystiq also criticized the little number of masters for not keeping the gameplay "fresh", arguing the higher amount of masters in prior Peggle games "meant that you were always adapting to new tricks and strategies, a feeling that only expanded further as you replayed old levels with new masters". While Digital Spy considered the new power-ups "much more powerful and visually striking", Donlan found them disheartening as "they don't make you rethink the game in", but claimed Berg to be an exception: "His animation is glorious [...] and with deep freeze you get a fleeting glimpse of the game Peggle 2 could have been if the designers had been a little more ambitious." Jeffrey was called a favorite master by Carter for being a take on the film The Big Lebowski (1998).

Walton, in addition to the gameplay, was also enthusiastic towards the presentation, including its music and "colorful and imaginative backdrops"; he noted that it was "brilliantly designed to stimulate the senses, and give you a real feeling of accomplishment, even for the smallest of tasks", which made Peggle 2 as "fun and as accessible as humanly possible." Carter called the visuals "vibrant, crisp, and full of character", noting its varied and detailed backgrounds and calling the soundtrack "easily PopCap's best work by far". Official Xbox Magazine UK was enthusiastic towards the audio, particularly its "twisted classical" fever themes of the master and the goat sounds of Jeff's levels. Splechta also applauded the visuals and sound but found them "disappointing" for a next-generation console game, reasoning that they were more suitable in a mobile game. Donlan made several nitpicks in commenting on the presentation; he found the "colourful cartoon fantasy" background artworks too simple in comparison to the strange "sort of rustic smokiness" that added "richness" to levels of its predecessors, was slightly turned off by levels of most masters not playing "Ode to Joy" during a fever, and claimed Bjorn looked like "a leering idiot."

=== Awards and nominations ===
Peggle 2 was nominated and won "Best Audio in a Casual/Indie/Social Game" as well as the "Best Interactive Score" award at the 12th Game Audio Network Guild Awards. During the 17th Annual D.I.C.E. Awards, the Academy of Interactive Arts & Sciences nominated Peggle 2 for "Casual Game of the Year".
