= The Mysterious Package Company =

Canadian game experience company

- Type: Private
- Founded: 2013
- Founder: Colin Bolton; Misha Schneider; Tim Sullivan
- Headquarters: Toronto, Ontario, Canada
- Website: https://mysteriouspackage.com/

The Mysterious Package Company is a Canadian company founded in 2013 that produces mystery, adventure, and horror-themed tabletop-puzzle games and mailed artifacts.

== History ==
Colin Bolton, Misha Schneider, and Tim Sullivan co-founded The Mysterious Package Company in 2013, as a company producing narrative-driven games delivered through the postal service. In 2015, Jason Kapalka, a Vancouver-based entrepreneur, joined the company as a primary investor.

Between 2015 and 2019, The Mysterious Package Company launched a series of Kickstarter campaigns. In 2015, they launched The Century Beast, which raised over $300,000 USD and was backed by 1,291 pledges. In 2016, the company launched a campaign for a Victorian horror experience, Filigree in Shadow.

In 2021, the company worked with Toronto-based puzzle company Curious Correspondence to produce Doomensions: Mystery Manor, which acquired 5,388 backers and raised $681,766. In 2023, the company formally acquired Curious Correspondence.

In 2024, the company published No Escape: Dead Man's Tale on Kickstarter. The following year, in 2025, they released Innsmouth Rising, a new crate-based narrative experience that also met its crowdfunding goal.

== Games ==
- The Century Beast (2017)
- The Buried Puppet (2020)
- The Ghost in the Machine (2025)
