= Shell Shockers =

2017 video game

- Publisher: Blue Wizard Digital
- Programmer: Josh Langley
- Platforms: Browser; Microsoft Windows; macOS
- Release: Browser; 1 September 2017 iOS; 1 June 2021; Android; 29 September 2021
- Genres: FPS; Shooter
- Mode: Multiplayer

Shell Shockers is a 2017 first-person shooter video game produced by Blue Wizard Digital. The games features a setting of eggs with guns, allowing players to control an egg with the choice of one of the seven different guns. The game was first released for browsers on September 1, 2018, then for Linux, iOS, and Android. A free-to-play game monetized through 3D mechanics, Shell Shockers is updated regularly using the games as a service model.

Following the game's release, it was met generally favorable reviews, with reviewers praising the unique concept, while criticism targeted its repetitive gameplay. Shell Shockers is considered the most popular game created by Blue Wizard Digital. In mid-2019, the game had almost 40 million players globally; as of July 2025, Shell Shockers has more than 200 million total lifetime players. The mobile version of the game was released for iOS on June 1, 2021, and for Android on September 29, 2021, both of which were shut down on January 15, 2024.

== Gameplay ==
Shell Shockers is a 3D, first person shooter video game that features eggs with guns, of seven different types. Players can control their egg by using the WASD keys, and create their own nicknames. The EggK-47 (based on the AK-47), the Scrambler (based on a break action shotgun), the Free Ranger (based on the SVD), the RPEGG (based on the RPG-7), the Whipper (based on the FN P90), the Crackshot (based on the M24), and the Tri-Hard (based on the Steyr Aug). There are thousands of player and item skins, most of which can be bought with Eggs, the in-game currency. Eggs are gained from "kills", each kill grants the player 10 eggs, unless the user is playing on Saturday or Sunday, in which case they get 2 times the normal amount of eggs. You can also buy eggs from their online shop. Alongside with the four gamemodes: Free For All, Teams, Captula the Spatula (based on Capture the flag), and King of the Coop (based on King of the Hill).

=== Controls ===
Controls are the movement keys in the game, that can perform actions and movements. In Shell Shockers, the format of the control is WASD/SHIFT, which is popular in browser-based FPS games. The controls in the game, by default, are:

==== Keybindings ====
- W-A-S-D to Move.
- SPACE BAR to Jump.
- SHIFT to Aim.
- LEFT CLICK to Fire.
- R to Reload.
- E to swap to Pistol
- Q to fire a Grenade (hold to throw further).
- F for Melee swing.
- G for weapon Inspect.
- LEFT CLICK to stop grenade from being launched. NOTE - This is not customizable.
- ENTER to type in the chat box. NOTE - This is not customizable.
- TAB to close the chatbox (can be turned off). NOTE - This is not customizable.
- SPACE to go up while spectating.
- SHIFT to go down while spectating.
- V for first person spectation. (Use the up and down arrows to change who you are spectating).
- LEFT CLICK for slow motion spectation.

==== Controller Bindings ====
- 0 to Jump.
- 7 to Fire.
- 6 to Aim.
- 2 to Reload.
- 3 to swap to Pistol.
- 5 to fire a Grenade.
- 1 for Melee swing.
- 4 for weapon Inspect.
- 6 to go up while spectating.
- 7 to go up while spectating.

==== Customization ====
The default controls can be changed in game settings to the players own comfort. The control settings are in the first panel of the settings, and they can be altered in-game. The player presses the key they play with when in a certain control box. Additionally, keys that are not used in the game can also be added as controls. Many players like to have right click as their aim button as it is like that in many other FPS games. It can also be beneficial to use the right mouse button as your grenade key because using 'Q' compromises easy access to the 'A' key, impacting movement.

== Development and release ==
Blue Wizard Digital began working on Shell Shockers which was made using the Babylon.js engine, later releasing it on September 1, 2017. A mobile version for the game was made and put on the Apple Store for iOS and Google Play Store until its shutdown in 2024.

== Reception ==
Shell Shockers is considered the most popular game made by Canadian video game company Blue Wizard Digital. In mid-2019, the game had almost 40 million players worldwide; as of July 2025, Shell Shockers has more than 200 million total lifetime players. Many other gaming platforms also offer the browser-based game, such as CrazyGames. The game received generally favorable reviews, with reviewers praising the uniqueness of the concept.

== Controversy ==
The Shell Shocker's Community fell under harsh criticism in mid-2026 when the playerbase made frequent references to political commentator Michael J Knowles. Fans adopted quotes from a viral video of his regarding "tipping non-humans" in reference to the combat among non-human characters in the game. Critics say references to Knowles reflect poorly on the community due to his controversial political opinions.
