= Ace of Cakes =

American reality television show

- Genre: Reality
- Created by: Lauren Lexton; Tom Rogan
- Written by: Heather Mitchell; Miriam Leffert; Dustin Rubin
- Directed by: Daniel Hopps; Brandy Menefee; Jeffrey R. Daniels; Matthew Carr
- Starring: Duff Goldman; Geof Manthorne; Mary Alice Yeskey; Sherri Chambers; Anna Ellison; Katherine Hill; Adam Goldstein; Richard Todd Karoll; Katie Rose; Mary Smith; Ben Turner; Elena Fox; Lauren Friedman; Erica Harrison; Mark Muller
- Country of origin: United States
- Original language: English
- No. of seasons: 10
- No. of episodes: 117 (list of episodes)

Production
- Executive producers: Lauren Lexton; Tom Rogan
- Producer: Authentic Entertainment
- Production location: Baltimore, Maryland
- Cinematography: Matthew Carr
- Editor: Grayce Lackland
- Running time: 22–24 minutes

Original release
- Network: Food Network
- Release: August 18, 2006 – February 11, 2011

Ace of Cakes is an American reality television show that aired on the Food Network. The show focused on the daily operations of Duff Goldman's custom cake shop, Charm City Cakes, in Baltimore, Maryland, including small-business ownership, working with various vendors, tasting with customers, constructing cakes, and delivering his products.

== Synopsis ==
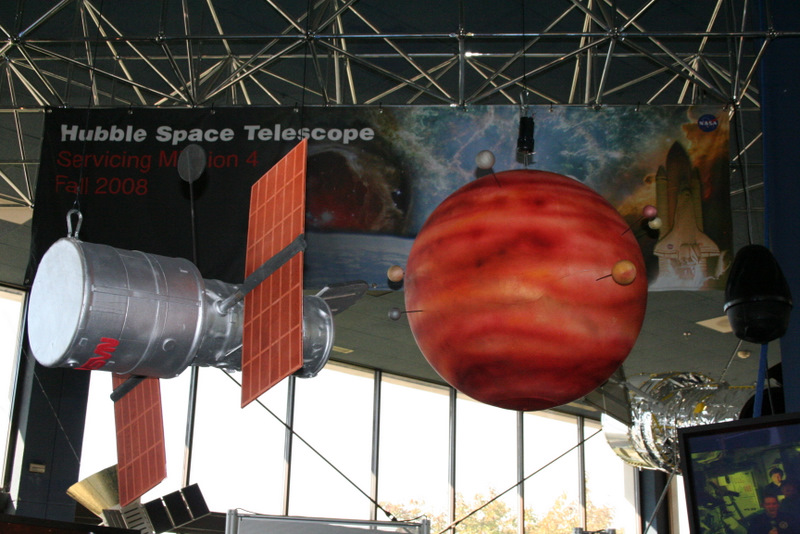
Model of the Hubble Space Telescope and Jupiter created by Charm City Cakes on display at the Goddard Space Flight Center in Greenbelt, Maryland

Ace of Cakes highlights the frantic activity encompassing the production of a substantial number of custom edible art cakes in a short period of time. The staff consists primarily of Duff Goldman's good friends who have varying personalities. They are frequently shown working long hours to build and decorate the cakes, yet are always making jokes to offset the alleged stress of hitting each deadline. Staff members sometimes drive the cakes to their final destinations, which can require road trips of several hundred miles. Goldman has an informal approach to running Charm City Cakes. He is known for using non-traditional cooking utensils such as blowtorches, belt sanders, and power saws, and more to construct his designs.

Some of the notable cakes created by Charm City Cakes include cakes for the Preakness Stakes horse race at Pimlico in Maryland, Baltimore Zoo, the premiere of the 2007 film Hairspray, a replica of Radio City Music Hall for The Rockettes, a hatbox-shaped cake for an 80-year-old grandmother, the Hogwarts castle for the premiere of the fifth Harry Potter film in Los Angeles, an edible replica of Wrigley Field, a replica of the shark ray at the Newport Aquarium, a cake for the Paramount Pictures premiere of the DreamWorks Animation film Kung-Fu Panda, and a replica of the Hubble Space Telescope for NASA. For the season finale of Season 5, the bakery's staff traveled to Hawaii to create a cake for the 100th episode of Lost.

=== Episodes ===
Season one of Ace of Cakes consisted of six episodes airing in early fall 2006. The show proved to be one of the highest-rated prime time shows in Food Network's history, causing the network to order 15 episodes for season two including a 2-hour-long episode featuring the official NFL cake for Super Bowl XLI. A one-hour special featured the show's first international delivery (to London, England) in an episode aired in December 2010. Season 10, planned to be the program's last (despite its popularity), premiered in January 2011 and had six episodes. The final episode featured a large-scale Delorean time machine cake created for Universal Studios' Back to the Future anniversary event in New York City. Seasons 1–5 have been released on DVD.

Season	Episodes	Originally released	
Season	Episodes	First released	Last released
1	6	August 18, 2006	September 22, 2006
2	13	January 19, 2007	May 18, 2007
3	13	July 20, 2007	December 14, 2007
4	13	January 25, 2008	May 9, 2008
5	13	June 30, 2008	October 17, 2008
6	13	January 16, 2009	May 10, 2009
7	13	July 20, 2009	October 30, 2009
8	14	January 15, 2010	April 30, 2010
9	14	July 2, 2010	December 10, 2010
10	6	January 7, 2011	February 11, 2011

== Production ==
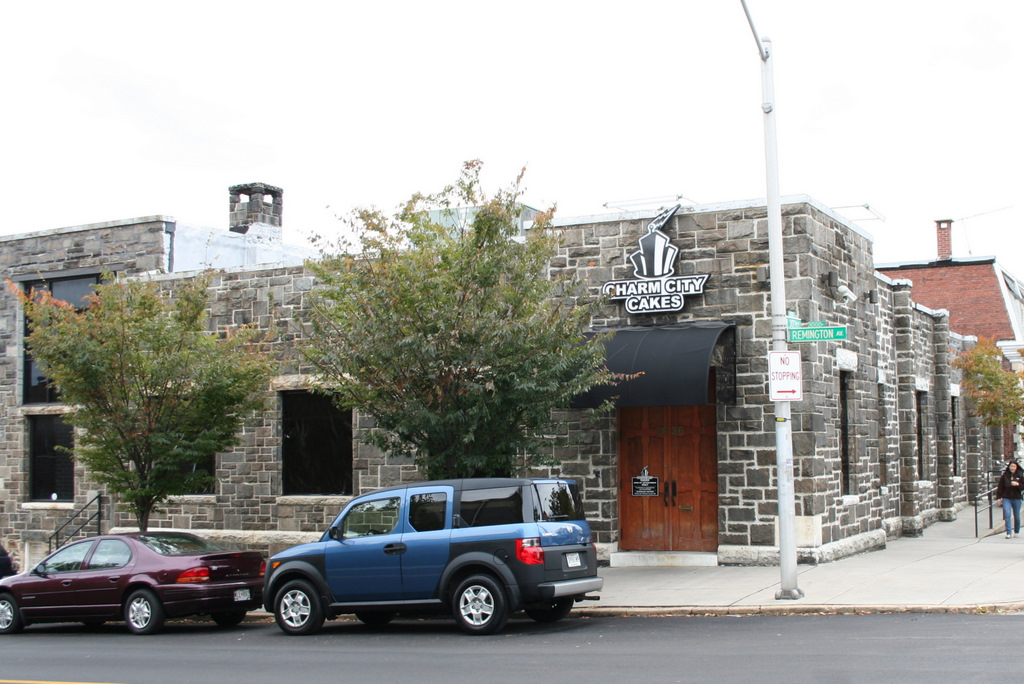
Charm City Cakes exterior at 2936 Remington Avenue in Baltimore

Ace of Cakes was shot on location at the bakery in Baltimore, Maryland, a converted church. The show has also featured other locations where Duff, Geof and occasionally others travel to in delivery of cakes such as Los Angeles, Chicago, New York, Washington, D.C., Miami, Boston, Alaska, and Hawaii, among others. The show was edited in Los Angeles at the show's production company, Authentic Entertainment, a subsidiary of Endemol.

== Reception ==
During Season 8, Ace of Cakes launched a new promotion concept involving a deck of Las Vegas-style playing cards.

Ace of Cakes has been a very large success with fans and critics alike. The show has brought Food Network some of the highest ratings it has ever received for a prime-time program. Ace of Cakes is also broadcast in the United Kingdom on food network, in Mexico and Latin America on FOXlife, in New Zealand on the Food Channel, in Australia on LifeStyle Food, in Spain on Divinity, and in Portugal on SIC Mulher.

On November 19, 2010, Food Network announced that the 10th season of Ace of Cakes would be its last. Season 10 began airing in January 2011, ending shortly thereafter in February.

In 2019, Food Network announced that Goldman would appear in a new series, Buddy vs. Duff, where he competes against Buddy Valastro of the similar TLC series Cake Boss (both networks are now owned by Discovery Inc.).

== Cancellation ==
The series concluded in late 2010; Over time, many felt the show had explored most cake-related concepts, making it increasingly difficult to introduce fresh ideas without repeating themes or overreaching creatively.
