= Storm Crow Manor =

Science-fiction themed bar in Toronto

Coordinates: 43.6668°N 79.3817°W

Storm Crow Manor is a science fiction-themed restaurant and bar in Toronto's Church and Wellesley neighbourhood, opened in 2018 by Canadian video game developer and entrepreneur Jason Kapalka, who previously cofounded PopCap Games. It has been called "Canada's nerdiest bar" by Toronto weekly NOW Magazine, "Toronto's greatest geek bar" by the Toronto Star, and "a nerd's paradise in downtown Toronto" by Toronto.com.

The interior of the Manor includes a variety of themed rooms like the neon-filled Cyberpunk Room, the Jules Verne-themed Nautilus room hidden behind a moveable bookshelf, small Heaven and Hell-themed counterpart rooms next to each other, the Twin Peaks-themed Black Lodge with mirrored ceiling and black and white tile, and the Victorian Hunting Lodge, a satirical take on a colonial hunting lodge theme with the head of a Dungeons and Dragons Beholder on the wall in place of a buffalo or antelope head. It also features a skull-lined staircase to the basement restrooms, and a frequently photographed Warhammer-themed baby change table that is also an altar to "Tzeentch, the Changer of the Ways". There is also a gift shop, the Bizarre Bazaar, that sells Storm Crow-branded merchandise, dice and novelty stickers along with curiosities like "dinosaur erotica" by Lola Faust, a favourite of musician Devendra Banhart.

Along with nerd culture-themed names for food and drink, the menu also includes items with Dungeons and Dragons-themed game dynamics: specifically, a roll of a 20-sided die (or d20). The "Random Shots" menu includes 20 different shots of varying palatability, with the specific shot decided by a roll of the die: a free Storm Crow-branded shot glass and a vodka-lemon-sugar shot with a roll of a 20, a shot of hot sauce if you roll a 1, and many in between. Similarly, the Dungeon Burger, Dungeon Pasta and Dungeon Poutine meals all include sauces and toppings chosen by random dice roll.

The restaurant runs frequent events by and for the LGBTQ+ community, including monthly Drag Brunch hosted by local drag queen Messy Margaret, and has raised money during Pride Month for LGBTQ+ oriented charities including Let's Stop AIDS and The 519.

Storm Crow Manor is the third Storm Crow restaurant opened by Kapalka, and is the only one that remains open post-COVID-19 pandemic after its Vancouver counterparts Storm Crow Tavern and Storm Crow Alehouse closed in 2020 and 2022 respectively. Although Kapalka expressed concern in a 2020 interview that the pandemic could lead to large-scale closures of neighbourhood restaurants like his, Storm Crow Manor survived the pandemic. Other restaurants in Kapalka's "Storm Crow Alliance" include Offworld Bar in Toronto, which opened in 2022 and is closing in the fall of 2025, and the tarot-themed speakeasy Arcana Food + Spirits in Vancouver, which opened in 2023.

Storm Crow Manor is a favourite restaurant of Star Wars and Kim's Convenience star Paul Sun-Hyung Lee.

== Notable Events ==
- Chickageddon: On September 23, 2019, Storm Crow Manor hosted "Chickageddon", with the tagline "Free Wings, Mothercluckers!" Offering an "a-peck-alypse of free chicken wings" with "no catches, no hidden fees and no major trade-offs required", the event saw attendees line up around the block.
- Halloween Hearse Delivery: For Halloween of 2020, during the Toronto indoor-dining ban due to the pandemic, the Manor offered home delivery of its skull-branded "Deathburgers" accompanied by a can of probably-cursed Liquid Death spring water - by a delivery person dressed as the Grim Reaper, who would arrive in a hearse to deliver the food. If the recipient ended up possessed by malign spirits due to their meal, the restaurant offered a coupon for "$1 off an exorcism".
- Pizza for your Soul: In November 2020, during the later days of the pandemic shutdown in Toronto, Storm Crow Manor started a delivery pop-up, "Church of Pizza". As a promotion, the restaurant offered a "free" pizza - paid for with one's immortal soul (and a $3 delivery fee).
- Pokemon Valentine's Day: For Valentine's Day in 2023, the Manor held a "Date-a-Pokemon" event, where diners could rent a giant Pokemon plush stuffed animal to be their dinner date, "guaranteeing them a date for their meal – a cute companion for both singles and couples alike."
