= Peggle: Dual Shot =

2009 video game

- Developer: Q Entertainment
- Publisher: PopCap Games
- Series: Peggle
- Platform: Nintendo DS
- Release: NA: March 3, 2009
- Genre: Puzzle
- Modes: Single-player, multiplayer

Peggle: Dual Shot is the fourth game in the Peggle series, developed by Q Entertainment and published by PopCap Games for Nintendo DS in March 2009. It is a compilation game including content from both Peggle (2007) and Peggle Nights (2008). This version of the game awards the player a star each time a purple bonus peg is hit, activating a new bonus minigame upon collecting five stars. The minigame requires that the player continually bounce a ball with pinball-like bumpers to collect diamonds and extra balls.

== Reception ==
Reception

Aggregate score
Aggregator	Score
Metacritic	84/100

Review scores
Publication	Score
1Up.com	A
Destructoid	9/10
GameDaily	9/10
GamePro	3.5/5 stars
GameRevolution	A−
GameSpot	7.5/10
GamesRadar+	4.5/5 stars
GameZone	9/10
IGN	8.6/10
Nintendo Life	8/10 stars
Nintendo Power	8.5/10
Wired	7/10 stars

The game received "favorable" reviews according to the review aggregation website Metacritic.
