= Peggle Blast =

2014 video game

- Peggle Blast HD version cover
- Developers: PopCap Games; Pogo
- Publisher: Electronic Arts
- Composer: Guy Whitmore
- Series: Peggle
- Platforms: Android; iOS; Web browser
- Release: Android, iOS; December 2, 2014; Web browser March 31, 2020
- Genre: Puzzle

Peggle Blast is a casual puzzle video game developed by PopCap Games and published by Electronic Arts in the Peggle franchise. Released on December 2, 2014, to Android and iOS, it is the second game in the franchise released to mobile, the first being a port of Peggle. Blast was exclusively available on Google Play Store and App Store until its release to web browsers as Peggle Blast HD on March 31, 2020. Electronic Arts announced Blast in late 2014.

== Gameplay ==
In most levels, players must hit all 25 orange pegs to beat the current level. However, some levels require the player to drop gems, hatch eggs or perform certain Style Shots in order to progress. Two power ups are provided that are unique to each character. Another different mechanic in Blast is that it uses a level system as well as a life system. If a player fails to beat the game, they lose a life and have to retry the level. Players who lose all five lives must wait until the lives are regenerated. Blast also introduces power ups for purchase which can be used in-game, such as the Super Guide power up. The game also introduces a lot of obstacles such as fireballs, pegs covered in mud and frozen pegs. Other game modes include hatching phoenix eggs or dropping diamonds to the bottom of the board. Players can connect to Facebook within the game to gain an extra life, send extra lives to friends and see friends within the world map. Achievements can be earned in-game by connecting to Google Play Games on Android or Game Center on iOS.

== Release ==
Blast was released both to iOS and Android on December 2, 2014, almost a year after its predecessor, Peggle 2. The game has received updates that add new levels and masters.

In March 2020, Peggle Blast HD was announced on Twitter from the official Peggle page. The game was released on Pogo.com on March 31, 2020. Blast HD has improved graphics, new achievements and integration of Pogo services.

== Reception ==
Reception

Aggregate score
Aggregator	Score
Metacritic	52/100

Review scores
Publication	Score
Destructoid	2/10
Gamezebo	50/100
Pocket Gamer	2.5/5
National Post	2/10

In general, the iOS version received "mixed" reviews according to the review aggregation website Metacritic. Gamezebo's critic, Nadia Oxford, praised the graphics of the game, but disapproved of in-app purchasing, writing "EA has us pegged for suckers". The Destructoid critic, Chris Carter, criticized the game's micro transactions, comparing it to Candy Crush.
