= The Food Channel =

American consumer website

- Website type: Consumer food news
- Owner: Noble Communications
- Founder: Bob Noble
- Website: www.foodchannel.com
- Commercial: Yes
- Registration: Free
- Launched: 2008
- Current status: Active

The Food Channel is an American consumer website with food recipes, news, reviews and advice. The site compiles information to produce food industry trends and aims to be a gateway for all things food.

Site content is separated into four categories: recipes, articles, blogs and videos. Recipes are created by The Food Channel chefs, as well as recipes from featured cookbooks. Content for the site is generated by a team of editors and the chefs of The Food Channel. Food bloggers also contribute content to the site.

== History ==
The Food Channel began as a newsletter in the 1980s. It predicted and reported trends in the food industry. The newsletter was published 23 times per year by Noble Communications (formerly Noble and Associates).

The Web site was launched on January 21, 2008, by Noble Communications under the direction of CEO, Bob Noble. Headquartered in Springfield, Missouri, the site was in Beta version for about one year, in which time new site features were tested and added. On January 22, 2009, the Web site finished Beta testing.

While in Beta stage, The Food Channel was nominated for the "We Love This Site" Web Award by the blogging site DivineCaroline.com.

== Trends ==
The Food Channel compiles information to spot industry trends. Using information gathered by The Food Channel and Noble's CultureWaves team, food industry trends are analyzed and reported on the site. In late 2008, the site released the Top Ten Food Trends of 2009. Developed by The Food Channel, with contributions from Neemee and the International Food Futurists, the list identifies the significant food movements for consumers, food service professionals and manufacturers.

== Food Widgets ==
In October 2008, the site introduced a food recipe Web widget. The widget provides users with daily recipes created by the site's chefs or provided by partner sites. The recipe widget is a follow-up to the food trends widget introduced one month prior. The widget is a box consisting of nine round buttons which display different content when scrolled over. The widget is used by a regional publication with a network of 90 magazines.

== See also ==
- Culinary art
- First We Feast
