= List of Ace of Cakes episodes =

The following is an episode list of the Food Network series, Ace of Cakes.

== Series overview ==
Season	Episodes	Originally released	
Season	Episodes	First released	Last released
1	6	August 18, 2006	September 22, 2006
2	13	January 19, 2007	May 18, 2007
3	13	July 20, 2007	December 14, 2007
4	13	January 25, 2008	May 9, 2008
5	13	June 30, 2008	October 17, 2008
6	13	January 16, 2009	May 10, 2009
7	13	July 20, 2009	October 30, 2009
8	14	January 15, 2010	April 30, 2010
9	14	July 2, 2010	December 10, 2010
10	6	January 7, 2011	February 11, 2011

== Episodes ==
=== Season 1 (2006) ===
No. overall	No. in season	Title	Original release date
1	1	"Triple Crown Cake"	August 18, 2006
Chef Duff Goldman and his Charm City Cakes team are introduced. The staff must produce 21 cakes in a week, including a special cake for the Preakness Stakes horse race. Other featured cakes are a jeep cake by Geof, and a cake Duff creates for a college friend's wedding. Other cakes are an Xbox cake, a fish cake, a dentist cake, a crazy pink-and-black cake, and several wedding cakes.
2	2	"Wedding Cakes and Headaches"	August 20, 2006
The episode's cakes include a four-tier wedding cake imitating the style of Aubrey Beardsley, a cake shaped like a vintage hat for a woman's surprise 80th birthday party, a massive wedding cake accompanied by 300 eight-layer cookies, and a surprise birthday cake for Duff's father, coming into town from Florida.
3	3	"Hell Week"	August 25, 2006
Hell week is the busiest week of summer: 27 cakes in 5 days, including several wedding cakes for Memorial Day weekend. Primary cakes are a tequila-bottle cake for two girls graduating from Goucher College, a replica of a German Shepherd Dog for a groom's cake, a four-tier deconstructed wedding cake for two men, and an elaborate four-tier wedding cake in which each tier represents a snapshot from a couple's vacations.
4	4	"Life's a Zoo"	September 8, 2006
Duff makes a pair of flamingo cakes for Zoomerang, the annual benefit gala for Maryland Zoo. Geof invents rice-krispie cannoli for the flamingos beaks. Duff collaborates with old friend Warren Brown of Sugar Rush when a D.C. couple orders a Capitol dome-shaped cake to sit atop a cupcake tower. Also featured is a flaming Fist of Rock groom's cake for a heavy metal-loving groom.
5	5	"Duff Goes Hollywood"	September 15, 2006
Duff gives cake-decorating lessons to a local troop of Brownies. The staff makes a bushel barrel of crabs, with ears of corn around the base, consisting of modeling chocolate and sugar. Duff appears on The Tonight Show with a birthday cake for Jay Leno; Duff and Geof are forced to make the cake in their Los Angeles hotel room, with the help of Mike McCary of Food Network Challenge. While in Los Angeles, Duff uses his power-tool skills on a Habitat for Humanity home, realizing a childhood dream at the Guitar Center on Sunset Boulevard where he plays a bass once belonged to Flea of the Red Hot Chili Peppers.
6	6	"Cake Walk"	September 22, 2006
An engaged couple has ordered a cake for each table in the shape of a bumper car. The Maryland Science Center receives a birthday cake in the shape of a dinosaur blowing out candles. The National Portrait Gallery in Washington, DC, gets two cakes for the grand opening of a new building: a peach-tree cake, combining cake and metal sculpture, and a mendhi cake with intricate piping.

=== Season 2 (2007) ===
No. overall	No. in season	Title	Original release date
7	1	"Chi-Town and Wedding Gowns"	January 19, 2007
Duff and Geof build a replica of Wrigley Field for a man's 80th birthday, and Duff drives 11 hours to deliver the cake. Richard creates a 10-point buck groom's cake for an avid hunter. Two of Mary Alice's friends are getting married and their cakes get special attention.
8	2	"The Boss Is Gone"	January 25, 2007
Duff is out of town and Mary Alice is left to juggle crazy phone calls and e-mails. She tries her hand at repairing a cake.
9	3	"Great Scot"	January 25, 2007
Duff dons a kilt to deliver a cow cake to a Scottish wedding. Other cakes include a "sweet sixteen" cake, a magnolia-themed cake that poses major problems for the Charm City staff, and a cake ordered by a nervous customer who plans to use it to propose to his girlfriend by placing the engagement ring directly on the cake.
10	4	"Four Weddings And A Rat"	February 9, 2007
Two women marrying want to mix the traditional and non-traditional in their cakes; one is a flowery, four-tier affair, the other a Baltimore icon — a large rat on a city manhole cover. Erica, a part-time decorator, is getting married and has ordered a wedding cake consisting of pair of owls perched on a branch. Another bride and groom celebrate their different cultures in their cakes: a Thai pagoda for her and a replica of the Brooklyn Bridge for the groom.
11	5	"Monkey Business"	February 16, 2007
First is a $2000 King Kong bar mitzvah cake. Then a replica of the Overseas Houston, a giant tanker, being christened in Chesterfield, Pa. The shipping company also ordered a champagne bottle made out of a cookie to christen the cake ship. Also, a woman is surprising her D.J. groom-to-be with a cake that looks like his beloved Technics turntable.
12	6	"Tributes and Tribulations"	March 2, 2007
Howard County, Maryland Fire and Rescue is hosting its annual flag football charity event, and the Fire Department of New York is sending a team for the first time since 9/11. Howard County has ordered a fire-truck cake with a special 9/11 flag suspended from the back. Also, the Olney Theater Group wants a replica of Cinderella's carriage; a three-tier sushi cake is made; and a woman planning a wedding surprises her mother, a fanatic for all things Egyptian, with a birthday cake that looks like an Egyptian cat statue with hieroglyphics.
13	7	"Flying High"	March 9, 2007
Geof tackles a groom's cake in the shape of the Olympic ski slope in Innsbruck, Austria, with the bride and groom skiing down the mountain. A surprise cake is created for a man who has received his pilot's license; his wife orders a cake in the shape of a Cessna 172 airplane. Fluid Movement is putting on Glitterama, the annual winter community-theater talent-show fund-raiser, and Duff plans a version of the Dance of the Seven Veils.
14	8	"Milestones and Monuments"	March 16, 2007
Duff and Geof make a cake in the shape of a pile of tennis balls for Martina Navratilova's 50th birthday. Duff has been asked to emcee Baltimore's annual holiday tree-lighting ceremony with the mayor, so Geof and Duff create a replica of Baltimore's Washington Monument including fireworks Duff will light off. Duff also makes a cake as a surprise for the 40th wedding anniversary of his college friend's parents, whom he considers his surrogate Jewish parents in Baltimore.
15	9	"Cake-Tastrophe"	March 30, 2007
Duff and his team have been brought in by Starbucks to make a special holiday cake at Union Station in Washington, D.C. After days of work, they create a train that looks like it is made of gingerbread. Also featured is a girl's 16th-birthday goth cake, complete with skulls and spiders. Charm City has been invited to make three massive cakes for a man's "Big Fat Greek Birthday". One of the cakes represents an old theater with It's a Wonderful Life on the marquee; another has a girl sipping a soda at a soda fountain.
16	10	"Shell Shocked"	April 13, 2007
Becky Smith is graduating and has ordered a cake from Charm City Cakes for her big party.
17	11	"Playing Games"	April 20, 2007
Charm City makes a cake in the shape of a Scrabble board for a client's mother; a gumball machine cake with real gumballs inside for a bat mitzvah party; and a birthday cake in the shape of a slot machine.
18	12	"The Super Cake"	April 27, 2007
Duff goes to Miami to make a cake for the NFL's Super Bowl party. It is the largest cake Charm City has made.
19	13	"Dr. Duff"	May 18, 2007
The team has been enlisted by a radiology company to create a cake in the shape of a CT scanner, complete with a patient inside.

=== Season 3 (2007) ===
No. overall	No. in season	Title	Original release date
20	1	"Wedding Bells and Shotgun Shells"	July 20, 2007
One of the bakery's very own is getting hitched. Duff and the staff are heading off to a firing range to do a little target practice.
21	2	"Tattoos and Traditions"	July 27, 2007
Duff takes the staff on a field trip to the Baltimore Tattoo Museum and the staff works on cakes including a duck hunt, a row house and an armadillo dressed like an EMT.
22	3	"Mary (Alice) Go Round"	August 3, 2007
Duff and the crew make a carousel cake with a special touch from Geof for Asbury Park's 110th anniversary.
23	4	"Challenge Road Trip"	August 10, 2007
Duff, Geof, and Mary Alice head to Denver to be celebrity judges for one of the Food Network's Extreme Cake Challenges.
24	5	"Rock & Roll"	August 17, 2007
Duff and his crew design special cakes for the Armed Forces Foundation Gala. They also make a cake for the band Clutch.
25	6	"Wishes Granted"	August 24, 2007
It's all about the kids this week at Charm City Cakes. Duff makes a little girl's wish come true.
26	7	"Stadium Games and Eating Brains"	August 31, 2007
Two stadium cakes must be delivered this weekend. The first is a groom's cake in the shape of Camden Yards. The other, due the next day, is a replica of Raven Stadium with NCAA lacrosse players on the field.
27	8	"Battleships and Birthdays"	September 7, 2007
Tom Clancy wants a birthday cake in the shape of the Tower of London to honor the fact that Clancy is the only American Beefeater. Duff's roommate from freshmen year is getting married, and Duff is making his wedding cake, a four-tier asymmetric cake with a Chesapeake Bay theme. Charm City Cakes is also Philadelphia bound; Helena has enlisted Duff and his crew to make an exact replica of the King Tut sarcophagus out of cake.
28	9	"Charm and Charities"	September 14, 2007
Duff has signed on to do another cake for Zoomerang, which is the Baltimore Maryland Zoo's big gala fund raising event. This year, the theme is elephants. A Night at the Wire is a huge charity event thrown by the HBO show The Wire, and Duff donates a cake for the party.
29	10	"Uncle Sam Wants Duff"	September 21, 2007
It's the Army's 232d birthday and they're doing it up: they've asked Duff to make a special tank cake for a big pre-game presentation with a four-star general and the managers of the Orioles and Nationals.
30	11	"Coach Duff"	September 28, 2007
Cake for Carmelo Anthony, a musician's cake in the shape of a piano, and a replica of the USS Carney.
31	12	"Hairspray Premiere"	October 17, 2007
Hairspray cake. John Waters interview. "Operation" game cake.
32	13	"Charm City Christmas"	December 14, 2007
Radio City Music Hall cake.

=== Season 4 (2008) ===
No. overall	No. in season	Title	Original release date
33	1	"The Harry Potter Cake"	January 25, 2008
Duff, Anna, and Ben travel to Hollywood for the Los Angeles premiere of Harry Potter and the Order of the Phoenix. In La, the complete construction of massively scaled edible replica of Hogwarts castle as seen in the film. The cake was on display at the official Warner Bros. premiere party, and featured appearance from Harry Potter stars Daniel Radcliffe and Rupert Grint.
34	2	"Volcano Cakes and Mix Tapes"	February 1, 2008
A celebrity softball game, a moonbounce cake, and a volcano cake.
35	3	"Airplanes and Arks"	February 8, 2008
Noah's Ark Bat Mitzvah, Delta Air airliner, and Subway car.
36	4	"Mascots and Mice"	February 15, 2008
Georgetown mascot cake.
37	5	"The Spy Who Caked Me"	February 22, 2008
Sir Roger Moore's 80th Birthday cake and an Exorcist cake.
38	6	"Skaters and Speedsters"	March 7, 2008
The crew makes cakes for All Pro skater and skate board designer Kris Markovich's surprise birthday, a four-tier fall season wedding cake, an "over-the-top" cute baby shower cake and a replica of Geof's childhood neighbor's 365 Porsche Speedster.
39	7	"Celebration Week"	March 14, 2008
Ear cake and clock tower cake.
40	8	"Police Cars and Wine Bars"	March 21, 2008
Police cruiser cake, yarn cake, and Harley Davidson cake. Book 'em, Duffo!
41	9	"Avenue Q Cake"	March 28, 2008
"You can be loud as the hell you want when you're making cake."
42	10	"Duff's Birthday"	April 4, 2008
Scrapple showdown and Duff's birthday cake.
43	11	"Skate Rattle and Roll"	April 25, 2008
Roller skate cake; Geof makes a Corvette cake after test driving a real one. Also featured is a cake in the shape of a mother manatee and her baby.
44	12	"Wedding Week"	May 2, 2008
A zany, madcap week featuring a cast of wacky cakebuilding fiends. Hey, that's not fondant!
45	13	"Book of Cakes"	May 9, 2008
A book about the bakery is in the works, so the team creates cakes that will be photographed for it.

=== Season 5 (2008) ===
No. overall	No. in season	Title	Original release date
46	1	"Food Network Friends"	June 30, 2008
Duff is shooting three television shows this week (Ace of Cakes, Diners, Drive-ins and Dives and Paula's Party), making a huge cake for the Broadway premiere of "Crybaby", and Geof is building the tallest cake in Charm City Cakes history: a six-foot skyscraper that will be delivered to Philadelphia.
47	2	"World's Largest Cupcake"	July 18, 2008
Duff and Geof create the World's Largest Cupcake for a charity bake sale in Minnesota. Other projects are a Roulette Wheel cake for a Baltimore charity's "Casino Night" and a replica of the Charm City bakery. Note: after the episode aired, Guinness World Records stripped Duff of the record for the World's Largest Cupcake due to the fact that it was made in 2 parts rather than one.
48	3	"Elephant Delivery Service"	July 25, 2008
The bakery makes cakes that include a replica of a book cart, an exact copy of a law professor's book on the Federalist Papers and a tower of toys for a set of twins' first birthday party, delivered by Duff in a pink elephant costume.
49	4	"Pandamonium"	August 8, 2008
Duff and the CCC crew build a giant cake for the Kung Fu Panda Premiere in Los Angeles. The cake has replicas of the entire Kung Fu Panda cast, as well as two smoke machines on timers.
50	5	"Swimming with the Sharks"	August 15, 2008
Duff delivers a cake to a Newport, Ky. aquarium to celebrate the birthday of a shark, and swims with a tank full of sharks, including the birthday girl. Back in Baltimore, the staff creates a Neapolitan Mastiff Cake for the local dog show and a machinegun-toting rubber ducky for a couple's wedding anniversary.
51	6	"Pinball Wizard"	August 22, 2008
The crew creates a Fenway park cake, a light up Goddess/Archer Diana and a vintage pinball machine for a convention. Duff participates in a big charity event, Hockey Fights Cancer.
52	7	"Lord Stanley"	August 29, 2008
The actual Stanley Cup comes to CCC for a visit to model for a wedding cake. The bakery also makes a bar mitzvah dirt bike/off-road cake and an island-themed cake with a working volcano on top.
53	8	"Gone to the Dogs"	September 12, 2008
Geof's dog Cotton serves as the model for a cake for Milkbone's 100th Anniversary. Charm City also makes a replica of the bridge of the Starship Enterprise (complete with Captain Kirk and the rest of the crew) and a Dachshund in a hot dog bun.
53	9	"Frogs to Turkey and Everything In Between"	September 19, 2008
For the third year in a row, Charm City Cakes is supplying a cake for Zoomerang, the Baltimore Zoo's annual gala black-tie fundraiser. This year, it's a large pond topped by Giant Golden Tree Frogs. The bakery also designs a replica of a Turducken for a sixteenth birthday party, and a replica of the Lincoln Memorial (complete with Reflecting Pool and the Washington Monument).
54	10	"Get Cake"	September 26, 2008
Duff, Mary Alice, and Geof travel to Boston for the premiere of Get Smart. Upon their return, they create a crazy cake for a client who's hosting his own funeral.
55	11	"Tanks, Trucks and Vikings"	October 3, 2008
The bakery cakes of the week include a replica of an Army tank for a veteran's wedding, a massive Mack Truck and an authentic Viking ship for a couple of re-enactors who are getting hitched at a Renaissance fair.
56	12	"The Big Cakeowski"	October 10, 2008
Duff creates a cake for the Lebowski-fest, a festival celebrating the Coen Brothers cult hit film, The Big Lebowski. Plus a stunning replica of the Hans Solo's Millennium Falcon.
57	13	"New Frontiers"	October 17, 2008
This week Duff and his team are making a replica of the Moon, complete with an astronaut, a giant peanut butter cup and a giant sandcastle cake. Then Duff & Mary Alice travel to L.A. to explore the possibility of opening a Charm City Cakes West bakery.

=== Season 6 (2009) ===
No. overall	No. in season	Title	Original release date
58	1	"Fire Fighters and Fire Breathers"	January 16, 2009
Duff makes a cake for the Firefighter Combat Challenge. Also a red dragon cake and a globe cake.
59	2	"Snow Boards and Cupcakes"	January 23, 2009
Snowboard terrain park cake, zombie hand cake, portrait wedding cake, and cupcakes for a friend.
60	3	"Tiki Time"	January 30, 2009
Tiki cake, couch-potato bridegroom's cake, and Duff makes a cake that combines a bride's dress pattern and her horses.
61	4	"Food, Fashion and Galactic Bounty Hunters"	February 6, 2009
Duff builds a giant whisk for a benefit in New York, while the team designs shoes for a fundraising fashion show. Also, a cake replica of Boba Fett's ship.
62	5	"Macy's and the Big Apple"	February 13, 2009
Macy's 150th birthday cake, skyline cake, and cowboy cake.
63	6	"King of Charm City"	March 6, 2009
Barbecue grill cake for the "King of the Hill" TV show's season finale, school locker replica cake, and a cake made to look like Dupont Circle in Washington, D.C.
64	7	"Ghoul's, Ghosts and Chocolate"	March 13, 2009
Haunted chapel cake with a zombie bride and groom, "It's the Great Pumpkin, Charlie Brown" cake, and a replica of a Hershey bar.
65	8	"What's Up Cookie?"	March 20, 2009
Duff and the crew make cakes related to cookies.
66	9	"I Do!"	March 27, 2009
Fortune cookie cake, a replica of an anesthesia machine, and an Edgar Allan Poe themed cake.
67	10	"The Eagle Has Landed"	April 3, 2009
Philadelphia Eagles' stadium cake and a replica of a Nikon camera.
68	11	"Demolition Cakes"	April 10, 2009
Cake in the shape of a house getting demolished, Christmas stocking cake, and bridal cakes.
69	12	"Bobble Head Bakery"	April 17, 2009
Antarctic birthday cake, Katherine brings a French children's book to life, and a bobble head baseball pitcher.
70	13	"LOST in Hawaii"	May 10, 2009
Duff and his crew go to Hawaii to create a special cake for the 100th episode milestone of the television series Lost.

=== Season 7 (2009) ===
No. overall	No. in season	Title	Original release date
71	1	"Baked Alaska"	July 20, 2009
Duff goes to Alaska to prepare a cake for the state's 50th anniversary.
72	2	"Three Ring Bakery"	July 31, 2009
The gang creates a gravity-defying pastry for Cirque du Soleil's big top troupe and Duff judges at the Eco-Ball.
73	3	"Cake Takes Flight"	August 7, 2009
Purse cake, a Wizard of Oz hot-air-balloon cake, and an equestrian cake.
74	4	"Pasta, Pizza and Pastry"	August 14, 2009
Gondola in Venice and a pizza pie full of Italian monuments with a gangster theme.
75	5	"Yankee Stadium"	August 21, 2009
Duff, Geof and Mary go to New York to celebrate the new Yankee Stadium. Also, bass-guitar cake is created.
76	6	"Big Red Squig"	August 28, 2009
The Charm City gang creates a video tribute at the Contemporary and Duff and Ben come up with the craziest video game star ever.
77	7	"Double Secret Surprise"	September 4, 2009
A bride and groom each order a surprise cake for the other, and a human-torso cake.
78	8	"It's a Hard Knock Cake for Duff"	September 11, 2009
Ben engineers a Dalek cake from the TV series Doctor Who that spins, yells and exterminates. Meanwhile, Duff and Mary Alice make their stage debut with the "Annie" national tour.
79	9	"Charm City Carnival"	September 18, 2009
Cake of the "Carnival Pride" and a marimba cake.
80	10	"En Garde!"	September 25, 2009
Duff throws out the first pitch at an Orioles game, a cake of Philadelphia's Mummers Parade is created, and a client challenges Geof to a duel.
81	11	"Get Your Kicks on Cake"	October 2, 2009
Katherine and Ben get their kicks on Route 66 as they concoct a period Airstream Diner. Lauren whips up a pacemaker cake for a cardiologist but gets too grossed out to do the research. And humidity wreaks havoc on CCC as their supersized bed cake goes into serious meltdown.
82	12	"Dizzy Doings"	October 9, 2009
Duff created an "Independence Day" wedding cake. Meanwhile, a medium comes to check out Charm City Cakes and a holiday cake is delivered to the Dizz.
83	13	"Harry Potter and the Big Apple"	October 30, 2009
Duff is invited to design a cake for the premiere of Harry Potter and the Half-Blood Prince. Later on, Mary Alice and Duff deliver a cake for the publication of the Ghost Girl novel.

=== Season 8 (2010) ===
No. overall	No. in season	Title	Original release date
84	1	"Man Caves"	January 15, 2010
85	2	"Fondant and Finances"	January 22, 2010
86	3	"Christmas in July"	January 29, 2010
87	4	"Copper, Carbonite and Jewels"	February 5, 2010
88	5	"A Four Letter Word For Pastry"	February 12, 2010
89	6	"Oprah!"	February 19, 2010
90	7	"Charm City Throwdown"	February 26, 2010
91	8	"A Cake to Take the Cake"	March 5, 2010
92	9	"Dog Day Afternoon"	March 12, 2010
93	10	"Have Mercy"	April 2, 2010
94	11	"The Revenge of Ivan the Terrible"	April 9, 2010
95	12	"Bake, Rattle and Roll"	April 16, 2010
96	13	"Clone Wars"	April 23, 2010
97	14	"Holiday on Icing"	April 30, 2010

=== Season 9 (2010) ===
No. overall	No. in season	Title	Original release date
98	1	"100 Episodes Of Cake"	July 2, 2010
99	2	"Miami Meltdown"	July 9, 2010
100	3	"30 Rock (And Roll)"	July 16, 2010
101	4	"Indy, Ice and Improv"	July 23, 2010
102	5	"Duff Goes to Bat"	July 30, 2010
103	6	"Boston and the Pops"	August 6, 2010
104	7	"Happy Birthday Jimmy John's"	August 27, 2010
105	8	"Full Throttle Bakery"	September 3, 2010
106	9	"Music and Mayhem"	September 10, 2010
107	10	"Grand Ole Opry"	September 17, 2010
108	11	"Charm City... Off the Grid"	September 24, 2010
109	12	"Slow Mules and Fast Cars"	October 1, 2010
110	13	"Holiday on Icing"	November 28, 2010
111	14	"UK Invasion"	December 10, 2010

=== Season 10 (2011) ===
No. overall	No. in season	Title	Original release date
112	1	"US Open"	January 7, 2011
Duff and his team have a very busy week as they prepare cakes for the US Open in Flushing Meadows, New York, a molar cake for an 80's flashback birthday party and an engine cake for Motorweek's 30th anniversary. Still, it doesn't keep them from running their own test of which would win a fight: a pizza or a bagel?
113	2	"Betty White Takes the Cake"	January 14, 2011
A charity cake for Betty White touches an emotional chord, Geoff and Duff make a holy quest, and the rest of the staff balances cakes just because they can.
114	3	"A Millionaire Moment"	January 21, 2011
The team makes a reunion cake for the indie rock band Pavement in the same week that they must make a cake that commemorates the 1500th episode of Who Wants to Be a Millionaire?
115	4	"Come On Down!!"	January 28, 2011
Duff is asked to guest on The Price is Right, so the team makes cakes and piles into the RV for a personalized delivery with a surprise on the West Coast.
116	5	"A Cake in Shining Armor"	February 4, 2011
Two big cakes have issues this week. First, Duff inexplicably decides to include his hated cupcakes in the design for the New York Ranger's anniversary cake. Second, the cake for Medieval Times begins to break down during the delivery.
117	6	"Charm City Cakes Goes Back to the Future"	February 11, 2011
Duff is commissioned to make the biggest and most complicated cake he's ever made for the 25th anniversary of Back to the Future, which will take up most of the week. Time will be made, however, for a Halloween-themed anniversary cake with overtones of Masterpiece Theatre.
