= Peggle =

2007 puzzle video game

- Steam header
- Developer: PopCap Games
- Publisher: PopCap Games
- Series: Peggle
- Engine: PopCap Games Framework
- Platforms: Windows: Mac OS X; iPod; Windows Mobile; Java ME; BREW; Nintendo DS; Xbox 360; PlayStation 3; iOS; PlayStation Portable; Zeebo; Android
- Release: February 27, 2007: Windows; February 27, 2007; Mac OS X, iPod; December 18, 2007; Windows Mobile; September 2008; Java ME, BREW; October 2008; Nintendo DS; February 25, 2009; Xbox 360; March 11, 2009; PlayStation 3; November 19, 2009; iOS; May 12, 2009; PlayStation Portable; February 11, 2010; Zeebo; March 9, 2010; Android; June 21, 2011
- Genre: Puzzle
- Modes: Single-player, multiplayer

Peggle is a casual puzzle video game developed by PopCap Games. Initially released for Microsoft Windows and Mac OS X systems in 2007, it has since had versions released for Xbox Live Arcade, PlayStation Network, the Nintendo DS (with the help of Q Entertainment), Windows Mobile, iOS, Zeebo, and Android; the game has also been ported as a Java application, and an extended minigame incorporated into the massively multiplayer online game World of Warcraft. A sequel was released in September 2008, titled Peggle Nights. PopCap, a subsidiary of Electronic Arts, announced Peggle 2 at E3 2013.

Inspired by pachinko and bagatelle, each level of Peggle challenges the player to shoot a limited supply of balls at a field of colored pegs to clear out specifically marked pegs while attempting to achieve a high score through skilled shot planning. Special powers associated with a diverse cast of cartoon "Peggle Masters" can be activated to aid the player in this task. Peggle initially sold slowly but was boosted by the inclusion of a specially designed demonstration in Valve's The Orange Box, and has since been downloaded over 50 million times, becoming one of the best video games ever released.

== Gameplay ==
Screenshot of a typical Peggle level in the Xbox Live Arcade's "Peg Party" mode

Within the game's main "Adventure" mode, Peggle is divided into fifty-five levels. Each level features an arrangement of approximately one hundred blue "pegs" positioned to correspond with the level's background picture, inside of three walls on the top and sides (leaving the bottom opened), along with other fixed and moving features. The goal of each level is to clear the board of the twenty-five random pegs that are turned orange at the start of the level, by using a ball launcher located at the top center of the screen to strike one or more of the pegs. Pegs light up when hit, and once the ball either falls through the bottom of the screen or is caught by the ball catcher that moves back and forth along the bottom in a fixed manner, the pegs will be removed. Struck pegs are also removed if the ball is stuck on them. The player begins each level with ten balls (twelve on the non-Touch iPod version) to clear the orange pegs but may earn more by landing the ball in the ball catcher or earning high scores on single shots. Failure to clear the board with the allotted number of balls will require the player to restart the level while completing this objective will allow the player to progress to the next board.

Every five levels in the Adventure mode correspond to playing with one of ten "Peggle Masters" cartoon characters that help the player. Each of the Peggle Masters has a unique special ability that is activated when the player strikes one of the two randomly selected green pegs on the board. Some activate immediately; one causes a second ball to be generated from the green peg when struck. Others will have effects that activate on the next shot or for several more shots; one shows the ball's path, including rebounds, while another will extend the length of the ball catcher. In the final five levels of the Adventure mode, called "Master" levels, the player can select which of the Peggle Masters they want to use.

In addition to clearing the board, the player is challenged to get high scores with each shot. Points come from two main sources: striking pegs and style points. Each struck peg earns points, with further bonuses gained by hitting numerous pegs on a single shot and clearing orange pegs, which builds up a scoring multiplier up to 10x when all but a few orange pegs have been cleared. Additionally, one random blue peg will be marked purple and revert to blue after the shot if it is not struck for each turn; striking this peg will further boost the player's score. Style points are awarded for making difficult shots, such as striking two orange pegs consecutively a distance apart or getting lucky bounces off the ball catcher. When the player clears the board of orange pegs, as announced by the song "Ode To Joy" and the message "Extreme Fever", the bottom of the level is replaced with five bins of different point values for the ball to fall into them. The player is awarded this score, including any unused balls remaining to get their final score for the level. If all the pegs on a level are cleared, a bonus is awarded, all the bins turn to the maximum value, and the message "Ultra Extreme Fever" is displayed.

In addition to the Adventure mode, the game features a series of challenges requiring the player to complete boards under stricter requirements, such as clearing more orange pegs or removing every peg from the board. A "Duel" mode allows the player to compete against another person or a computer AI on the same board in attempting to reach the highest score. Since the player typically cannot predict patterns, Duel mode requires a lot of skill to master. Thus, Duel is the only mode in which players earn ranking points. The Xbox Live and PlayStation Network versions add a "Peg Party" mode, in which up to four players compete on their separate boards using a limited number of balls, each attempting to get the highest score. In each of these modes, the game generally offers the ability for players to select which Peggle Master they wish to use.

== Development ==
Peggle was originally envisioned by PopCap's studio director, Sukhbir Sidhu, who was inspired by pachinko machines. However, he recognized that pachinko was mostly luck-based, and would not translate well into a video game. After seeing a 2D game engine created by PopCap programmer Brian Rothstein, Sidhu was able to realize his game and worked with Rothstein for the first five months of its development before bringing in additional programmers. Initial designs focused on bringing together elements of pachinko with Breakout. The team initially incorporated a "rapid-fire" mechanic used in pachinko, along with numerous moving targets; however, they found this made the levels either too fast-paced or too demanding of the player. They found over time that a static field of pegs provided a more enjoyable experience for the player; the path of the ball would be more predictable, leading to the gameplay mechanic requiring only a random subset of orange pegs to be cleared. Once the team had established the core mechanics of the game, they brought on character artist Walter Wilson, background artist Marcia Broderick and an additional coder, Eric Tams, to help complete Peggle within its two-year development period. Even with their game established, Sidhu and Rothstein faced internal challenges at PopCap to increase the level of interactivity with the game, but the two defended their vision of the game.

The design team struggled with a theme for the game, and for a while, the game was based around the mythological god Thor. During this time, the game was called Thunderball and much darker in theme than the final product. Eventually, the game changed themes to be more lighthearted. The team realized that the name no longer fit the game. From there, the designers came up with calling the game "Pego" and then "Pogo". The team later discovered that, since Pogo was already the name of EA's Flash portal, they would not be able to use it.

Though the game was technically completed within a year, PopCap opted to spend more time polishing it, improving the visuals and background images. The team worked on refining the various sound effects used in the game to provide an appropriate atmosphere. In some cases, they found the desired sound quickly; the sound of the ball hitting a peg was borrowed from another game in development at PopCap but was considered perfect for Peggle. Other cases required iteration; the sound of the ball shooter was originally closer to that of a cannon, while a "plunk" sound effect was used when the ball catcher caught a ball. These were changed to more airy sounds (an air cannon and a brief angelic chorus) to make the elements sound as if part of the game's music. The team found that it helped to create a defining moment at the end of each level when the player is moments from clearing the final peg. This feature initially was programmed as a simple message stating "Extreme Fever" and the music of "Ode to Joy" as a placeholder. Sidhu wanted to recreate the "wild sounds and visuals" present in winning pachinko games. However, the team found that the players reacted well to the simpler placeholder elements. The team focused on improving the presentation of these, including adding a zoom on the current ball as it neared the last orange peg to be cleared.

PopCap was granted a patent in the US for the gameplay of Peggle as an "Electronic game, such as a computer game involving removing pegs" in 2014.

== Versions and sequels ==
Peggle was first released for Windows on February 27, 2007. Peggle Extreme was packaged with the Windows version of The Orange Box, featuring levels inspired by Half-Life 2, Team Fortress 2, and Portal. It includes ten levels with one Peggle Master and five Challenges. Peggle Extreme was eventually made free to download for anyone with a Steam account. The game was developed in conjunction with Valve after PopCap's Teams learned that Peggle was played often at Valve's offices and that the company had helped to promote the game on Steam. PopCap proposed a version that would pay tribute to Valve's games, which Valve readily warmed up to, helping PopCap with its development, including providing graphical assets and artwork.

Peggle was ported to Xbox Live Arcade, the PlayStation Network, the iPod, iOS, and Android. The Xbox Live Arcade and PlayStation Network versions includes the "Peg Party" mode in which up to four players can compete simultaneously. The Xbox Live Arcade, PlayStation Network, and iOS versions include the "Duel" mode, with the iOS version having the players share the iPhone between turns. Peggle has also been ported as a minigame inside World of Warcraft in the form of a free, downloadable addon. It features levels based on the game, though including a limited set of Peggle Masters to use. Warcraft players can also use Peggle to decide how to distribute loot from successful raids or dungeons. Subsequently, in July 2009, a free standalone, ten-level edition of Peggle themed around Warcraft in a similar manner as Peggle Extreme was released.

PopCap released a sequel to the original game, Peggle Nights, in September 2008 for Windows. The sequel expands upon Peggle by adding one new Peggle Master, adding new levels and challenges. The Xbox Live and PlayStation Network versions of Peggle received Nights as a downloadable expansion to the game on November 19, 2009. Peggle Nights was made available as an in-app purchase for iOS devices. Peggle: Dual Shot is a Nintendo DS port of the game, developed by Q Entertainment; the game includes content from both Peggle and Peggle Nights. This version of the game awards the player a star each time a purple bonus peg is hit, activating a new bonus minigame upon collecting five stars. The minigame requires that the player continually bounce a ball with pinball-like bumpers to collect diamonds and extra balls. The console version of the game was ported to select Chinese Android-based TVs by a now-defunct company Transmension Games, that earlier released complete ports of other PopCap games such as Bejeweled 2, Bejeweled 3, Zuma, Feeding Frenzy 2 and Plants vs. Zombies. This version supports gamepads and remote controls. It was unofficially localized to English and can be played with touch screen in Android's phone and tablet. In 2013, PopCap Games announced Peggle 2 at the E3 2013 expo. A year later, Peggle Blast was announced for mobile devices.

== Reception ==
Reception

Aggregate score
Aggregator	Score
Metacritic	85/100 (Windows); 89/100 (X360)

Review scores
Publication	Score
Eurogamer	9/10 (Windows); 9/10 (XBLA)
IGN	9/10 (XBLA)
Official Xbox Magazine (US)	9.5/10 (XBLA)
PC Gamer (UK)	8/10 (Windows)
PC Zone	83% (Windows)

Peggle was well received by critics. Alec Meer of Eurogamer found the game to be a "constant series of rewards" in gameplay, graphics, and audio that would continue to satisfy the player. Gus Mastrapa of The A.V. Club considered the game "comfort food for the omnivorous gamer" with its ability to draw even hardcore gamers into its fantasy visuals. IGN's Erik Brudvig cited Peggle as being "simple enough for anybody to pick up and instantly start having fun". The Xbox Live version was seen as truthful to the PC version, and while the Peggle Party mode was considered an interesting addition, Dan Whitehead of Eurogamer felt it was a "curiously remote approach" that did not fully integrate a multiplayer experience into the game, a point also stated by Mastrapa who lamented the lack of online leaderboards.

The game did not initially perform well in sales when released for Windows, but according to Sidhu, sales of the game took off following the release of Peggle Extreme as part of The Orange Box; Sidhu stated that the special version of the game helped to bring in video game players that would "never be caught dead playing a game with unicorns and rainbows". Peggle (both trial and full versions) has been downloaded more than 50 million times from the Internet as of early 2009. Although, PopCap has not released how many of these downloads were for full sales.

Upon its release on Xbox Live Arcade, Peggle was the top-selling game on the service for two weeks and remained in the top ten applications for several weeks afterward. Within a month, over 100,000 players were listed on the Xbox leaderboards for Peggle. Although, this number also includes players who purchased the game through the PopCap Arcade Volume 2 retail package, which contained the game as well. IGN editor Cam Shea ranked it eighth on his top ten list of Xbox Live Arcade games. He stated that while its theme could easily turn players off, they should not let it, as "It's infectious, and most importantly, fun". In a list compiled by the IGN staff in September 2010, Peggle was listed as the 10th best Xbox Live Arcade of all time.

The release of Peggle on iOS was extremely popular, placing in the top ten applications purchased through the App Store for the first two weeks it was available. During a weekend in June 2009, the title was put on sale for $1 (normally $5); the sale caused the game to become the most purchased application in the App Store. A PopCap representative stated they made as many sales during these four days as they had in the three weeks prior, after the game's launch in the Store.

Peggle is considered by some critics to be an addictive game, with Forbes noting that it entices the user to play "just a few more minutes". MSNBC named Peggle one of the "Top 5 most addictive computer games of all time". PopCap funded a study at East Carolina University which found that Peggle players experienced a "45% decrease in depression" in individuals under the age of 25. Rock Paper Shotgun interpreted the same study more imaginatively, reporting: "Peggle was clear champ, improving the total 'mood' by 573% across all study subjects". Peggle along with other PopCap games were also found to help children with ADHD improve their attention span and memory recall, in a survey done by Information Solutions Group on behalf of PopCap.

Peggle was nominated for the 2007 Game Developers Choice Awards for "Best Downloadable Game", "Best Handheld Game" (for the iPod port), and "Innovation" awards. The game was also nominated for the "Downloadable Game of the Year" category during the 11th Annual Interactive Achievement Awards by the Academy of Interactive Arts & Sciences. Peggle appeared as #40 on the 2007 PC Gamer Magazine (UK) list of their 100 favorite video games of all time.

Geoff Ramsey, one of the creators of the company Rooster Teeth, stated "it was a toss up between three games" for the top rated game when creating the regulation rank list.

== Sources ==
- "Making of Peggle". PopCap Games. 2008. Archived from the original on 2008-11-19.
