= Northwest Symphony Orchestra =

Northwest Symphony Orchestra may refer to:

- Northwest Symphony Orchestra (Chicago)
- Northwest Symphony Orchestra (Burien)
- Northwest Indiana Symphony Orchestra
