= Blue Wizard Digital =

Canadian video game developer

- Industry: video game industry
- Founded: 2014
- Founder: Jason Kapalka
- Headquarters: Comox Valley, British Columbia
- Website: bluewizard.com

Blue Wizard Digital is a Canadian video game development studio and game publisher founded in 2014 by Jason Kapalka, one of the founders of PopCap Games and an early pioneer in the mobile casual gaming space. It is based in the Comox Valley, British Columbia, and is the only video game studio currently headquartered in Comox, as The Long Dark studio Hinterland is now based in Vancouver.

The studio specializes in campy horror puzzle games, humorous first-person shooters and other innovative variations on existing models of gaming.

== Popular games ==
=== Shell Shockers ===
Blue Wizard's most popular game as of August 2024 is Shell Shockers, a browser-based first-person shooter in which players take the form of weaponized eggs and attempt to kill each other. Players can drop in and play anonymously in public lobbies or create persistent accounts and private maps to play with friends. The game features a variety of pop culture-influenced, punnishly-named features, including 4 gamemodes: Free For All, Teams, Captula the Spatula, and King of the Coop (based on King of the Hill). The game also holds 7 guns: the EggK-47 (based on the AK-47), the Scrambler (based on a break action shotgun), the Free Ranger (based on the SVD), the RPEGG (based on the RPG-7), the Whipper (based on the FN P90), the Crackshot (based on the M24), and the Tri-Hard (based on the Steyr Aug). There are thousands of player and item skins, most of which can be bought with Eggs, the in-game currency.

As of late 2025, the game had hit 200 million players worldwide, and is one of the most popular .io games available online.

=== Slayaway Camp ===
"A puzzle game for people who hate puzzle games," Slayaway Camp is set at a summer camp that's been set upon by a serial killer. Its blocky chibi-like style of character art makes it "adorably gruesome" and perhaps more palatable for those who would otherwise shy away from a horror game. Originally released in 2016 for PC, its success led to a console port of the game in 2017, with releases for Xbox One and PS4.

Kapalka has stated that one of his intentions in running Blue Wizard is to "find a way to make... puzzle games less boring, more viscerally exciting," and both Slayaway Camp and Friday the 13th: Killer Puzzle, another popular Blue Wizard camp-horror game, serve this goal.

Slayaway Camp II: Netflix and Kill is in development and will be released on Steam at a currently unknown date.

=== Friday the 13th: Killer Puzzle ===
Blue Wizard's only license-based game thus far, F13 is based on the popular Friday the 13th franchise and, similar to Slayaway Camp, has been called "adorable and violent"; its gameplay is also based largely on the sliding-block puzzle genre of game that founder Jason Kapalka helped to invent with Bejeweled.

== Controversies ==
Shell Shockers is commonly played by school students on Chromebooks, which are provided by schools for educational purposes. In an effort to circumvent this, Blue Wizard buys alternative domains (such as "geometry.best") to attempt to circumvent this. They also have multiple websites that only load games when on Chromebooks (such as "historicreview.com") to continue to make their game available at school.
