= Jason Kapalka =

Canadian game developer (born 1970)

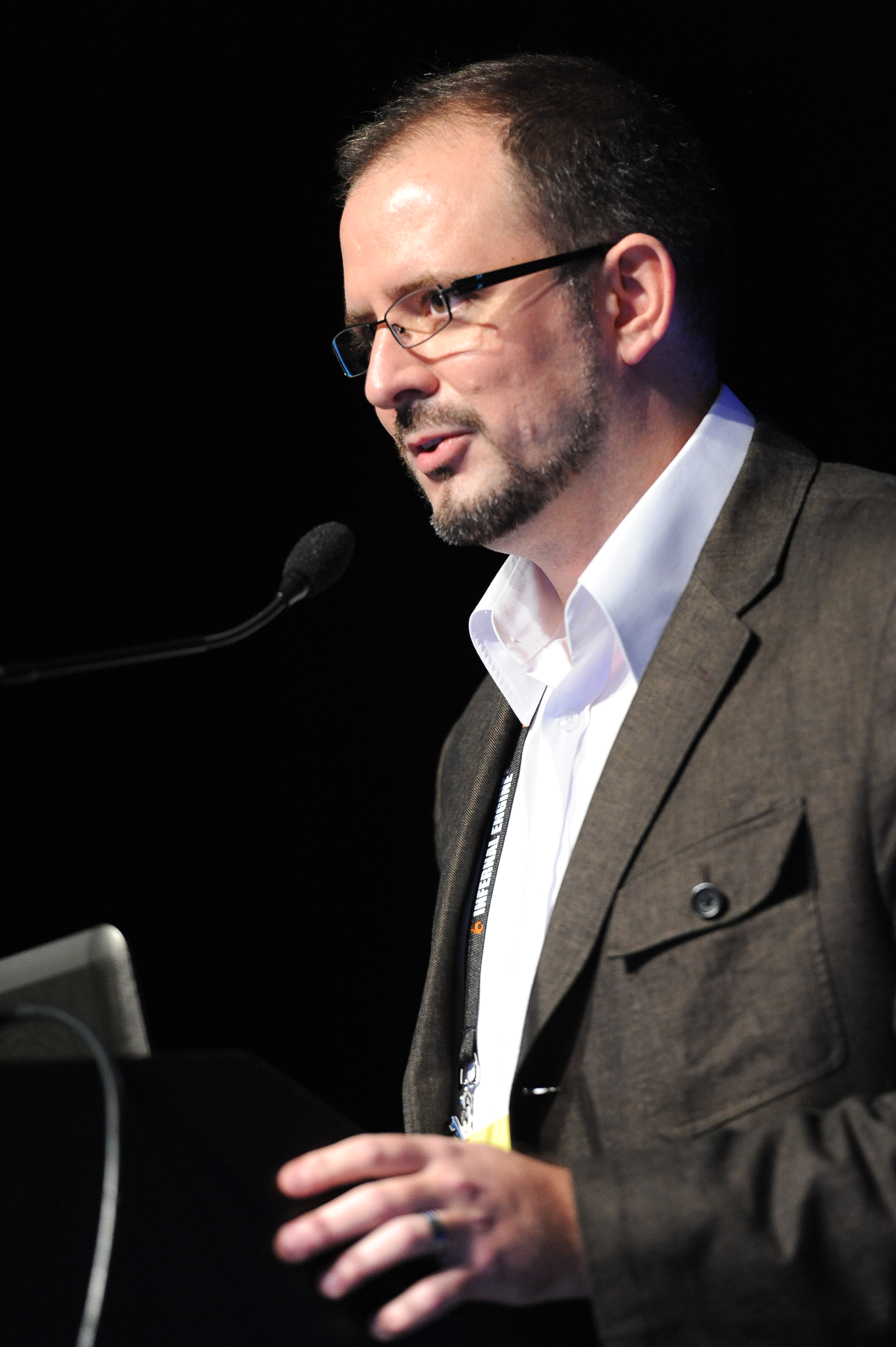
- Kapalka in 2011
- Born: 1970 (age 55–56)
- Occupations: Game developer; entrepreneur

Jason Kapalka (born 1970) is a Canadian game developer and entrepreneur based in the Comox Valley and Vancouver, British Columbia. He is best known as one of the founders of the video game studio PopCap Games Inc., along with John Vechey and Brian Fiete. PopCap was founded in 2000 and sold to Electronic Arts in 2011. PopCap was originally titled “Sexy Action Cool,” but the name was changed when it was found to be misleading to many players. Kapalka is listed at #82 on IGN's list of the top 100 game creators of all time.

== PopCap Games ==
Kapalka was the designer of Bejeweled (2000), PopCap Games' first major hit and an early example of "freemium" casual games. The game was originally known as "Diamond Mine", after a song by the Canadian band Blue Rodeo, but was changed to Bejeweled at Microsoft's insistence. By 2013, variations of Bejeweled had been downloaded over 100 million times.

From 2000 to 2011, Kapalka was the chief game designer at PopCap and worked on many titles including Peggle, Zuma, Alchemy and other popular casual games in the mid 2000s.

With Plants vs. Zombies, Kapalka and the team at PopCap took the risk of hiring designer George Fan away from Blizzard Entertainment for a long development cycle on an offbeat title. He told Digital Spy, "It's possible where it was a case where it was too weird, too hardcore and too scary for the soccer mums, and where it's too cutesy for hardcore players." The initial release as a PC downloadable for casual players was not successful, but the game later developed a following among Steam players, then Xbox, and finally became a major hit on smartphones, paving the way for a variety of sequels and spin-offs and becoming a video game franchise.

PopCap sold to Electronic Arts in 2011, and Kapalka left the company in 2014 to pursue other projects.

== Current projects ==
=== Blue Wizard Digital ===
Soon after his departure from PopCap, Kapalka founded Blue Wizard Digital, a video game development studio and publisher specializing in campy horror games and shooters, including Slayaway Camp and an officially licensed Friday the 13th puzzle game that has been released for the Nintendo Switch. "I wanted to try working on some games that were out of PopCap’s normal range... stuff that was too violent or weird or hardcore for PopCap," Kapalka has said of his choice of genre.

=== Storm Crow Alliance ===
In 2011, Kapalka opened Storm Crow Tavern in Vancouver, envisioning it as a "sports bar for geeks"; Storm Crow Alehouse followed in 2015. In 2018, the Storm Crow brand expanded to Toronto with Storm Crow Manor, housed in a grand heritage manor dating to 1877, which the Toronto Star calls "basically like a Planet Hollywood or Hard Rock Café, but it celebrates genre entertainment of all kinds". Due to the Covid-19 pandemic, Storm Crow Tavern closed in 2020 and Storm Crow Alehouse followed in 2022. However, Storm Crow Manor continues to thrive.

In 2022, Kapalka opened Offworld Bar, a "space bar" with innovative multisensory cocktails and enormous projection screens, in Toronto under the Storm Crow Alliance umbrella. It was named one of BlogTO's "Best New Bars in Toronto" for 2022.

In April 2025, Kapalka and his wife, Jessica Langer Kapalka, transformed Offworld into Grizzly Bar, a Canadiana-themed bar and restaurant. The decision was made in response to the United States government’s trade war with Canada. Grizzly Bar has been called “the most Canadian bar in town” by the Toronto Star, and kicked off its operations with a surprise performance by Canadian retired astronaut Col. Chris Hadfield, who covered “Bobcaygeon” by the Tragically Hip at the opening party. Grizzly Bar also accepts paper Canadian Tire money on par with the Canadian dollar.

Kapalka plans to continue to expand the Storm Crow brand.

=== The Mysterious Package Company ===
Kapalka became involved with the Mysterious Package Company in 2013, after spotting a strange crate on the shelf at the home of a friend, Mass Effect and The Long Dark voice actor Mark Meer, and tracking down the manufacturer. He became an investor and advisor to the Mysterious Package Company in 2015.
