= List of PC games (D) =

The following page is an alphabetical section from the list of PC games.

== D ==
Name	Developer	Publisher	Genres(s)	Operating systems(s)	Date released
Damnation	Blue Omega Entertainment	Codemasters	Third-person shooter	Windows	May 25, 2009
Dark Souls	FromSoftware	Namco Bandai Games	Action role-playing	Windows	August 23, 2012
Dark Souls II	FromSoftware	Bandai Namco Games	Action role-playing	Windows	April 24, 2014
Dark Souls III	FromSoftware	Bandai Namco Entertainment	Action role-playing	Windows	April 12, 2016
Dark Sun Online: Crimson Sands	Strategic Simulations	Total Entertainment Network	RPG, fantasy	MS-DOS	February 1, 1996
Dark Sun: Shattered Lands	Strategic Simulations	Softgold Computerspiele GmbH	RPG, fantasy	MS-DOS	September 1, 1993
Dark Sun: Wake of the Ravager	Strategic Simulations	Strategic Simulations	RPG, fantasy	MS-DOS	1995
Darksiders 2	Vigil Games	THQ	Hack and slash, platformer	Windows	August 14, 2012
Darkstone: Evil Reigns	Delphine Software International	Electronic Arts ^{EU}, Gathering of Developers ^{NA}	Action RPG	Windows	July 31, 1999
Daryl F. Gates' Police Quest: SWAT	Sierra Entertainment	Sierra Entertainment	Interactive movie, simulation, action-adventure	Windows, macOS	September 30, 1995
Day of Defeat	Valve	Valve	First-person shooter	Windows, Linux, macOS	August 4, 2000
Day of Defeat: Source	Valve	Valve	First-person shooter	Windows, Linux, macOS	September 26, 2005
DayZ	Bohemia Interactive	Bohemia Interactive	Open-world, first-person shooter, RPG	Windows	December 16, 2013
Dead by Daylight	Behaviour Interactive	Behaviour Interactive	Survival horror	Windows	June 14, 2016
Dead Island	Techland	Deep Silver	Zombies, survival	Windows, Linux, macOS	October 20, 2011
Dead Space	EA Redwood Shores	Electronic Arts	Survival horror, third-person shooter	Windows	August 20, 2008
Dead Space 2	Visceral Games	Electronic Arts	Survival horror, third-person shooter	Windows	January 25, 2011
Dead Space 3	Visceral Games	Electronic Arts	Action-adventure, survival horror, third-person shooter	Windows	February 5, 2013
Deadlight	Tequila Works	Microsoft Studios	Cinematic platformer, survival horror, sidescroller	Windows	August 1, 2012
Dear Esther	The Chinese Room	The Chinese Room	Art	Windows, Linux, macOS	February 14, 2012
Death Knights of Krynn	Strategic Simulations	Strategic Simulations	Fantasy, RPG	MS-DOS, Commodore 64, Amiga	January 15, 1991
Deathmatch Classic	Valve	Valve	First-person shooter	Windows, Linux, macOS	June 1, 2001
Defcon	Introversion Software	Introversion Software	RTS	Windows, Linux, macOS	September 29, 2006
Delta Force	NovaLogic	Electronic Arts	Tactical shooter, first-person shooter	Windows	November 1, 1998
Delta Force 2	NovaLogic	NovaLogic	Tactical shooter, first-person shooter	Windows	November 3, 1999
Delta Force: Black Hawk Down	NovaLogic	NovaLogic	First-person shooter	Windows, macOS	March 24, 2003
Delta Force: Black Hawk Down: Team Sabre	NovaLogic	NovaLogic	First-person shooter	Windows	January 20, 2004
Delta Force: Land Warrior	NovaLogic	NovaLogic	Tactical shooter, first-person shooter	Windows	November 7, 2000
Delta Force: Task Force Dagger	Zombie Studios	NovaLogic	First-person shooter	Windows	June 27, 2002
Delta Force: Xtreme	NovaLogic	NovaLogic	First-person shooter	Windows	April 22, 2005
Delta Force: Xtreme 2	NovaLogic	NovaLogic	First-person shooter	Windows	June 2, 2009
Deltarune	Toby Fox	Toby Fox	RPG	Windows, macOS	June 5, 2025
Detective Instinct: Farewell, My Beloved	Armonica LLC	Armonica LLC	Adventure	Windows	October 26, 2026
Democracy 3	Positech Games	Positech Games	Government simulation	Windows, Linux, macOS	October 14, 2013
Desperados: Wanted Dead or Alive	Spellbound Entertainment	Atari	Real-time tactics	Windows	April 20, 2001
Desperados 2: Cooper's Revenge	Spellbound Entertainment	Atari	Real-time tactics	Windows	April 28, 2006
Desperados III	Mimimi Games	THQ Nordic	Real-time tactics	Windows	June 16, 2020
Deus Ex	Ion Storm	Eidos Interactive	Action role-playing	Windows, macOS	June 26, 2000
Deus Ex: Human Revolution	Eidos Montréal	Square Enix	Action role-playing	Windows	August 23, 2011
Deus Ex: Invisible War	Ion Storm	Eidos Interactive	Action role-playing	Windows	December 3, 2003
Deus Ex: Mankind Divided	Eidos Montréal	Square Enix	Action role-playing	Windows	August 23, 2016
Diablo	Blizzard North	Blizzard Entertainment, Ubisoft	Action role-playing, hack and slash	Windows, macOS	December 31, 1996
Diablo II	Blizzard North	Blizzard Entertainment, Sierra Entertainment	Action role-playing, hack and slash	Windows, macOS	June 29, 2000
Diablo III	Blizzard Entertainment	Blizzard Entertainment	Action role-playing, hack and slash	Windows, macOS	May 15, 2012
Digital Combat Simulator	Eagle Dynamics	The Fighter Collection	Flight simulator	Windows	December 10, 2008
Directive 8020	Supermassive Games	Supermassive Games	Interactive drama; Survival horror	Windows	May 12, 2026
Dino D-Day	800 North and Digital Ranch	800 North and Digital Ranch	Action, indie	Windows	April 8, 2011
Dirt 3	Codemasters	Codemasters	Racing, arcade	Windows	May 24, 2011
Divine Divinity	Larian Studios	CDV, Snowball Studios	RPG	Windows	September 22, 2002
Dofus	Ankama Games	Ankama Games	MMORPG	Windows, Linux, macOS	September 2004
Doloc Town	RedSaw Games Studio	Logoi Games	Farming sim	Windows	August 6, 2026
Doom	id Software	GT Interactive	First-person shooter	MS-DOS, Linux	December 10, 1993
Doom II: Hell on Earth	id Software	GT Interactive	First-person shooter	MS-DOS, Macintosh	September 30, 1994
Doom 3	id Software	Activision	Survival horror, First-person shooter	Windows, Linux, macOS	August 3, 2004
DOOM	id Software	Bethesda Softworks	First-person shooter	Windows	May 13, 2016
Doom Eternal	id Software	Bethesda Softworks	First-person shooter	Windows	March 20, 2020
Doom: The Dark Ages	id Software	Bethesda Softworks	First-person shooter	Windows	May 15, 2025
Doki Doki Literature Club	Team Salvato	Serenity Forge, Team Salvato	Psychological Horror	Windows	September 22, 2017
Dota 2	Valve	Valve	MOBA	Windows, Linux, macOS	July 9, 2013
Downwell	Moppin	Devolver Digital	Scrolling shooter, platform	Windows	October 15, 2015
Dragon Age II	BioWare	Electronic Arts	Role-playing	Windows, macOS	March 8, 2011
Dragon Age: Inquisition	BioWare	Electronic Arts	Role-playing	Windows	November 18, 2014
Dragon Age: Origins	BioWare Edmonton	Electronic Arts	Role-playing	Windows, macOS	November 3, 2009
Dragon Age: Origins – Awakening	BioWare Edmonton	Electronic Arts	Role-playing	Windows, macOS	March 16, 2010
Dragon Quest X	Square Enix, Armor Project	Square Enix	RPG	Windows	August 2, 2012
Dragon's Dogma	Capcom	Capcom	Action role-playing, hack and slash	Windows	May 22, 2012
Dragon's Dogma 2	Capcom	Capcom	Action role-playing	Windows	March 22, 2024
Dragons of Flame	U.S. Gold	Strategic Simulations	Action, RPG, fantasy	MS-DOS, Amiga, Amstrad CPC, Atari ST, Commodore 64, ZX Spectrum	September 1, 1989
DragonHeart: Fire & Steel	Funcom	Acclaim Entertainment	Hack and slash, Platformer	Windows	November 13, 1996
Dragon Knight	ELF Corporation	ELF Corporation	Eroge; tactical role-playing	MSX, PC-88, PC-98, X68000	November 1, 1989
Dragon Knight II	ELF Corporation	ELF Corporation	Dungeon crawler; Eroge	MSX2, PC-88, PC-98, X68000	December 20, 1990
Dragon Knight 4	ELF Corporation	ELF Corporation	Eroge; tactical role-playing	PC-98, X68000, FM Towns, MS-DOS, Windows	February 25, 1994
DragonStrike	Westwood Associates	Strategic Simulations	RPG	MS-DOS, Amiga, Commodore 64, X68000	1990
DRAMAtical Murder	Nitro+chiral	Nitro+chiral	BL game, visual novel	Windows	March 23, 2012
Dreamcast Collection	Sega	Sega	Various	Windows	February 22, 2011
Driver	Reflections Interactive	GT Interactive	Driving, action	Windows, Macintosh	June 25, 1999
Driver 3	Reflections Interactive	Atari	Racing, shooter	Windows	June 24, 2004
Driver: Parallel Lines	Reflections Interactive	Atari	Racing, third-person shooter, action-adventure	Windows	March 14, 2006
Driver: San Francisco	Ubisoft Reflections	Ubisoft	Action-adventure, racing	Windows, Mac OS X	September 1, 2011
Duke Nukem	Apogee Software	Apogee Software	Platformer	MS-DOS, Windows, macOS	July 1, 1991
Dune	Cryo Interactive	Virgin Interactive	Adventure, strategy	MS-DOS, Amiga	November 1, 1992
Dune II	Westwood Studios	Virgin Interactive	Real-time strategy	MS-DOS, Amiga, RISC OS	December 1992
Dune 2000	Intelligent Games, Westwood Studios	Virgin Interactive, Electronic Arts	Real-time strategy	Windows	September 4, 1998
Dungeon Defenders	Trendy Entertainment	Trendy Entertainment	Tower defense, action RPG	Windows, Linux, macOS	October 19, 2011
Dungeon Keeper	Bullfrog Productions	Electronic Arts	RTS, god game, dungeon management game	Windows	June 26, 1997
Dungeon Keeper 2	Bullfrog Productions	Electronic Arts, Sold-Out Software	RTS, god game, dungeon management game	Windows	June 30, 1999
Dungeons & Dragons Online	Turbine, Inc.	Warner Bros., Atari, Codemasters	MMORPG	Windows, macOS	February 28, 2006
Dungeons of Dredmor	Gaslamp Games	Gaslamp Games	Roguelike, indie	Windows, Linux, macOS	July 13, 2011
Dwarf Fortress	Bay 12 Games	Bay 12 Games	Construction and management simulation, Roguelike	Windows, Linux, macOS	August 8, 2006
Dying Light	Techland	Warner Bros.	Zombies, survival	Windows	January 27, 2015
Dying Light: The Following	Techland	Warner Bros.	Zombies, survival	Windows	February 9, 2016
Dying Light 2	Techland	Techland	Zombies, survival	Windows	February 4, 2022
Dying Light: The Beast	Techland	Techland	Zombies, survival	Windows	August 22, 2025
Dynasty Warriors 4: Hyper	Omega Force	Koei	Hack and slash; tactical action	Windows	April 1, 2005
Dynasty Warriors 6	Omega Force	Koei	Hack and slash	Windows	July 11, 2008
Dynasty Warriors 7	Omega Force	Tecmo Koei Games	Hack and slash	Windows	March 9, 2012
Dynasty Warriors 8: Xtreme Legends	Omega Force	Tecmo Koei Games	Hack and slash	Windows	May 13, 2014
Dynasty Warriors 8: Empires	Omega Force	Tecmo Koei Games	Hack and slash	Windows	February 27, 2015
Dynasty Warriors 9	Omega Force	Tecmo Koei Games	Hack and slash	Windows	February 8, 2018
Dynasty Warriors: Origins	Omega Force	Tecmo Koei Games	Hack and slash	Windows	January 17, 2025
