= Armored Fist =

1994 video game

- Developer: NovaLogic
- Publisher: NovaLogic
- Director: David Seeholzer
- Producer: John A. Garcia
- Designers: John A. Garcia; Stewart Kosoy; David Seeholzer
- Programmer: David Seeholzer
- Composer: Jeff Marsh
- Series: Armored Fist
- Platform: MS-DOS
- Release: 1994
- Genre: Tank simulator
- Mode: Single-player

Armored Fist is a video game developed and published by Novalogic for the PC. It was followed by Armored Fist 2 and Armored Fist 3.

== Gameplay ==
Armored Fist is a tank simulation and strategy game involving the armed forces of both the United States and the Soviet Union.

== Development and release ==
Armored Fist was developed by American studio NovaLogic. Produced and designed by the company's head John A. Garcia, development began in 1990. Garcia found that the state of computer technology at the time allowed for more realistic tank warfare such as strategic terrain masking. He explained that the whole team was "keyed into the process" of researching tanks in books, television, and other popular media. "It's not uncommon to come into work at NovaLogic and have an artist run in with a tape from The Discovery Channel with the first ever recording of a certain tank firing," he said. "The entire staff will analyze it over and over for art perspectives, design ideas, and so forth." The developers even spent a day learning about tanks at Marine Corps Air Ground Combat Center Twentynine Palms.

The game originally went by the working title Battlefield 2000 with development overlapping with other NovaLogic projects including the combat helicopter simulator Comanche: Maximum Overkill and the science fiction mech shooter Ultrabots. The company had planned to release the Armored Fist in mid‐1993 using polygon graphics, but it was delayed when this was substituted with the company's Voxel Space, a raster graphics engine designed by Kyle Freeman. Garcia considered it to the most complex product the team had worked on up to that point, consisting of eight man-years of programming and a quarter million lines of hand-assembled code. He recounted that nearly one man-year of work went into the game's construction set alone, which he opined was as much time as some people spend creating an entire game.

== Reception ==
Reception

Review scores
| Publication | Score |
|---|---|
| Next Generation | 4/5 |
| PC Gamer (US) | 65% |
| Electronic Entertainment | C |

Next Generation reviewed the game, rating it four stars out of five, and stated that the game was "Charming cold war fun." Power Play was disappointed by the game's weak overall visual design.
