= Russell Brower =

American video game composer

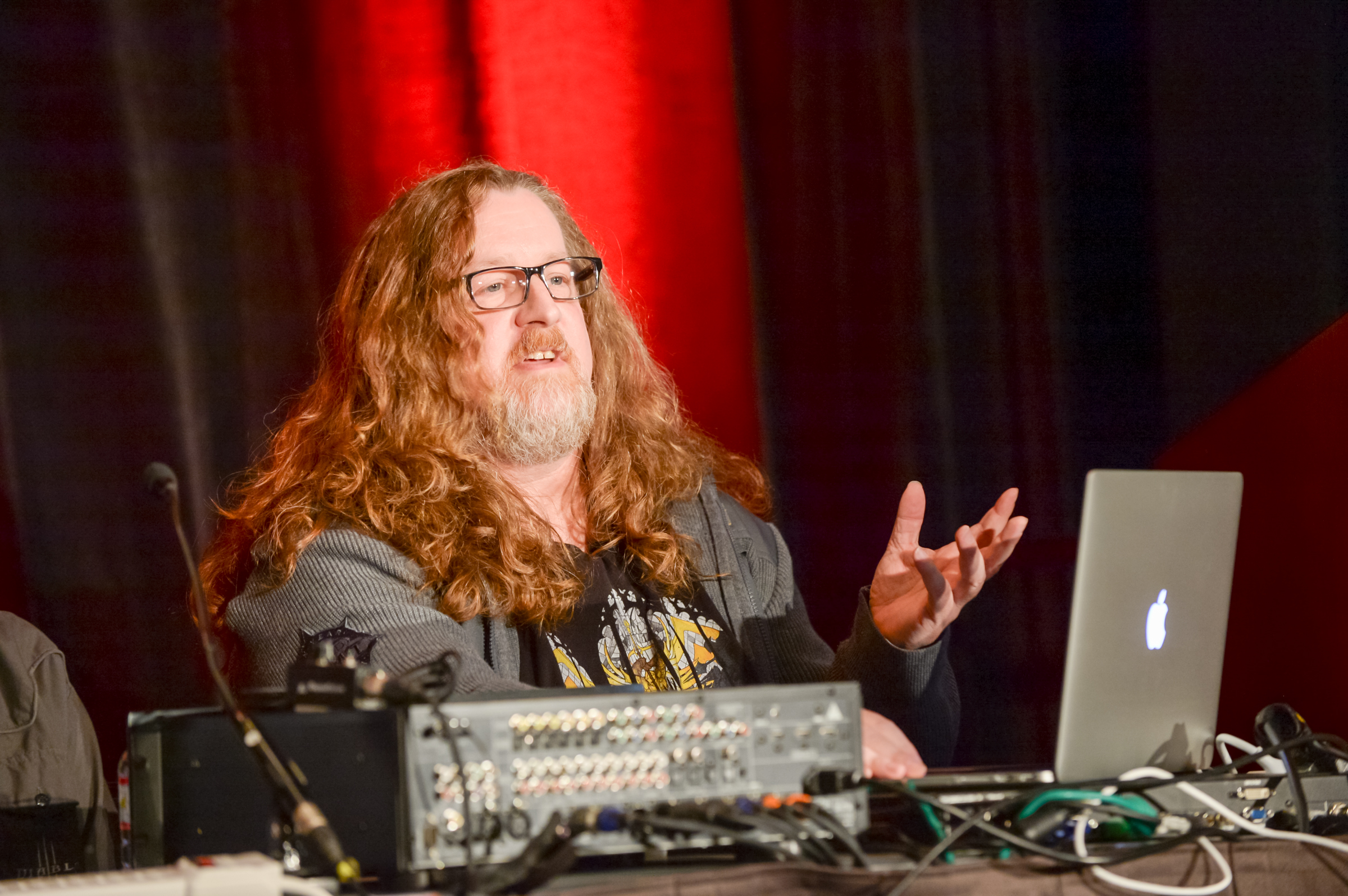
Brower presenting on Diablo III: Reaper of Souls at GDC 2015

Russell Brower is an American music composer and three-time Emmy Award-winning sound designer who has created sounds for Tiny Toon Adventures, Animaniacs and Batman: The Animated Series, and video game music for games including Joint Operations: Typhoon Rising, World of Warcraft, StarCraft II, Diablo III and Arena of Valor. He was previously the Director of Audio/Video for Blizzard Entertainment, the sound designer/editor at Warner Bros. Animation and DiC Entertainment, the Audio Director at NovaLogic, and the Principal Media Designer and Music Director at Walt Disney Imagineering.

"Invincible", from his score for World of Warcraft: Wrath of the Lich King, made its first appearance in the Classic FM Hall of Fame Top 300 in April 2014 at no 52. It was Brower's first appearance in the Hall of Fame.

On July 21, 2017, he announced that his position as the Sr. Audio Director/Composer at Blizzard Entertainment was eliminated. At the time he left he stated he may contribute as a freelance composer, but since then has referred to Blizzard's environment as toxic in response to the lawsuit alleging a "frat boy" culture with sexual harassment at Blizzard.

== Work ==
- Arena of Valor: The Return of Volkath (2019)
- Delta Force: Black Hawk Down (2003)
- Diablo III (2012)
- Diablo III: Reaper of Souls (2014)
- Dota 2: The International 2019 Music Pack (2019)
- Hearthstone (2014)
- Joint Operations: Typhoon Rising (2004)
- StarCraft II: Wings of Liberty (2010)
- StarCraft II: Heart of the Swarm (2013)
- World of Warcraft: The Burning Crusade (2007)
- World of Warcraft: Wrath of the Lich King (2008)
- World of Warcraft: Cataclysm (2010)
- World of Warcraft: Mists of Pandaria (2012)
- World of Warcraft: Warlords of Draenor (2014)
- World of Warcraft: Legion (2016)
- Tarisland (2024)
- World of Warcraft: Midnight (2026)
