= F22 (disambiguation) =

F22 and F-22 usually refer to:

- Lockheed Martin F-22 Raptor, an American stealth fighter aircraft
  - F-22 (series), a series of computer games by Novalogic
    - F-22 Raptor (video game), a 1998 video game
  - F-22: Air Dominance Fighter, a 1997 video game by Digital Image Design
  - F-22 Interceptor, a 1991 video game by Electronic Arts for the Sega Mega Drive/Genesis
  - F-22 Total Air War, a 1998 computer game from Infogrames for Windows 95

F22, F-22, F 22 or F.XXII may also refer to:

- F-22 (psychedelic), a drug
- Farrier F-22, a production trimaran sailboat designed in New Zealand by Ian Farrier of Farrier Marine
- Fokker F.XXII, a 1935 Dutch four-engined 22-passenger airliner
- General Avia F 22, a 1998 Italian two-seat monoplane
- F-22P Zulfiquar-class frigate of the Pakistan Navy
- 76 mm divisional gun M1936 (F-22), a Soviet 76.2 mm divisional gun of the World War II era
- HMS Jackal (F22), a 1938 British Royal Navy J-class destroyer
- BMW 2 Series (F22)
- PRR F22, a Pennsylvania Railroad locomotive classification
- F 22 Kongo, a Swedish Air Force squadron participating in the United nations peace-keeping operations in Congo 1961–1964
- f/22, an F-number measure of photographic lens' aperture size
- F22, the ICD-10 code for persistent delusional disorders
- Fluorine-22 (F-22 or ^{22}F), an isotope of fluorine
- Perry Municipal Airport (Oklahoma)
