= Delta Force (video game) =

1998 video game

- Developer: NovaLogic
- Publisher: NovaLogic
- Producer: Wes Eckhart
- Designer: Mat Jennings
- Programmer: Daniele Gaetano
- Artist: Keith Rust
- Composers: Tom Hays; Alan Koshiyama
- Series: Delta Force
- Engine: Voxel Space
- Platform: Windows
- Release: NA: October 21, 1998; 27 years ago; EU: February 12, 1999; 27 years ago
- Genre: Tactical first-person shooter
- Modes: Single player, multiplayer

Delta Force is a tactical first-person shooter developed and published by NovaLogic. It was released for Windows in October 1998. Delta Force was designed to be a military simulation loosely based on the United States' Delta Force special operations army unit.

The game was a critical and commercial success and it, along with a number of other high profile FPS games at the time, helped to popularize and define the tactical shooter genre. It went on to spawn a series, and a sequel, Delta Force 2, was released the following year.

== Gameplay ==
The player wielding an M4 carbine

The player assumes the role of a Delta Force operator who takes part in military operations in various theatres, and may customize their in-game avatar during the game's menu screen, selecting from various faces, as well as selecting a male or female operator. Objectives typically involve the elimination of a hostile presence in a region, assassinating a high-profile target, destroying military equipment or escorting POWs or civilians to an extraction point. Depending on the mission the player also needs to make it to an extraction point himself after fulfilling all other objectives. All five campaigns are available from the start and additional missions are unlocked as previous ones are completed. Sometimes multiple missions are unlocked at once and it is up to the player which order to play them in. The game features 40 missions in total, specifically taking place in Peru, Chad, Indonesia, Uzbekistan, and Novaya Zemlya.

The AI in the game varies depending on the difficulty chosen by the player, as well as varying in spawn location from play-through to play-through. The lower the difficulty, the worse their aim is and the less they react and move around relative to the player. The higher the difficulty, the better their aim is, the faster they lock on to the player's location, and they use more advanced tactics, such as moving in small groups and providing cover fire while the others advance.

=== Equipment ===
Before each mission the player is able to choose their equipment. Default loadouts differ from mission to mission but the player can exchange it without any restrictions. The inventory is based on three slots: one for the main weapon, one for extra equipment and one for a sidearm. Unlike many other shooters of the era, bullets are actual objects in the game with simulated ballistics which account for drop and time to reach targets, requiring the player to lead targets that are far enough away.

On all of the maps, there are also scattered pickups that the player can use to their advantage. The player can decide whether to turn these on or off in the settings menu. Ammo pickups refill ammo, while medical pickups restore player health (despite player health not being visible through the HUD).

=== Multiplayer ===
Delta Force also features LAN and online multiplayer for up to 32 players. All missions from the singleplayer campaign can be played cooperatively with additional players replacing the AI-controlled Delta Force operatives. Additionally deathmatch, king of the hill and capture the flag are available, along with team variations.

== Development ==
Delta Force uses NovaLogic's own proprietary Voxel Space engine, known from their earlier games such as the Comanche series, which uses voxels to visualise terrain while polygons are used for rendering characters, vehicles, buildings and other details. This method allowed for draw distances and terrain detail unseen in first person shooters at the time and supported the game's attempt to simulate realistic outdoor combat at distances of up to several hundred meters. A limitation of the engine was that it did not support any form of 3D acceleration.

== Reception ==
Reception

Aggregate score
| Aggregator | Score |
|---|---|
| GameRankings | 80% |

Review scores
| Publication | Score |
|---|---|
| CNET Gamecenter | 8/10 |
| Computer Games Strategy Plus | 4.5/5 |
| Computer Gaming World | 4/5 |
| Edge | 7/10 |
| EP Daily | 6.5/10 |
| GamePro | 3.5/5 |
| GameRevolution | A− |
| GameSpot | 9.1/10 |
| IGN | 8.7/10 |
| Next Generation | 3/5 |
| PC Accelerator | 8/10 |
| PC Gamer (US) | 89% |

The game received "favorable" reviews according to video game review aggregator GameRankings. GameSpot's Michael Ryan called it "a very impressive game overall", particularly praising the game's mission and sound design, albeit pointing out its outdated visuals. He also drew comparisons to Tom Clancy's Rainbow Six, released earlier the same year, but noted Delta Force's limited preparation options compared to the latter. He also praised the multiplayer mode but noted that technical problems made it hard to play. PC Gamer's Todd Vaughn also drew comparisons to Rainbow Six but noted Delta Force's focus on long-distance fights and lower level of realism. He concluded: "Overall, Delta Force is a surprising and welcome addition to the genre that uses just the right mix [of] action and tactics to set itself apart from the crowd." Next Generation wrote, "Though Delta Force's standalone play is often uninspired, the multiplayer is one of the most satisfying gaming experiences available today."

== Sequels ==
The game was successful enough to receive a direct sequel, Delta Force 2, the following year and spawn a long-running series. The last game in the series was Delta Force: Xtreme 2, released in 2009. Another game titled Delta Force: Angel Falls was announced but never released due to NovaLogic's closure in 2016.

Inspired by the popularity of Ridley Scott's war film Black Hawk Down, chronicling the Battle of Mogadishu, NovaLogic developed a Delta Force game with the same theme titled Delta Force: Black Hawk Down, which was released in 2003. Due to the rise in popularity of military-themed multiplayer shooters with vehicular combat, most notably DICE's Battlefield series, NovaLogic also developed a multiplayer focused spin-off of the Delta Force series titled Joint Operations: Typhoon Rising, released in 2004. In 2023, a Delta Force reboot (previously known as Delta Force: Hawk Ops) was announced, later released on 2025 as a free-to-play game.
