= Tachyon: The Fringe =

2000 video game

- Developer: NovaLogic
- Publisher: NovaLogic
- Producer: Michael S. Maza
- Designer: Randy Casey
- Programmer: Randy Casey
- Artists: Keith Rust; Timothy Higgins
- Writers: Lukas Mandrake; David Merrick; Kevin R. O'Hara; Jason Ryan
- Composer: Tom Hays
- Platform: Microsoft Windows
- Release: EU: March 30, 2000; NA: April 20, 2000
- Genre: Space combat simulation
- Modes: Single-player, multiplayer

Tachyon: The Fringe is a Space combat simulation video game developed and published in 2000 by Novalogic. It features the voice acting of Bruce Campbell as main character Jake Logan in a 3D space simulator. Tachyon was developed by Randy Casey, who had previously written two other titles for Novalogic: F-22 Lightning II and F-22 Raptor.

== Story ==
The story of Tachyon: The Fringe is set in the 26th century, where mankind has left Earth to colonize the far reaches of space, and has many characteristics of a space opera. The Sol system is a place of relative peace, which is kept by the police force called Star Patrol. Out on the Fringe, where Star Patrol has little presence, megacorporations, pirate clans and colonist groups clash, frequently violently.

The player takes the role of Jake Logan, a mercenary fighter pilot working comfortably in the Sol system. Early in the campaign you are framed for the terrorist bombing of a starbase and are exiled to the Fringe, barred forever from your home. The primary conflict in the Fringe is between the Galactic Spanning (GalSpan) corporation and a group of anti-sol spacer colonists, the Bora - for mining rights, space stations, and territorial control of the Fringe, and they each offer Logan a new start. The Bora want to preserve their independence in the Fringe, particularly their Bora sector, threatening GalSpan's profits in the region.

If the player sides with the Bora, they fight to stymie the "Spanners" attempts to demoralise and displace the Bora, and sabotage GalSpan operations. After many setbacks, Jake overcomes overwhelming odds to destroy the massive new Hephaestus mining station live in front of the Tachyon News Service, humiliating GalSpan and tanking their share price, forcing them to shut down their operations in the fringe and leave the Bora alone.

GalSpan meanwhile offers the chance to work for them, defending GalSpan interests and destroying Bora "terrorists". After many successes GalSpan completes their new Hephaestus station, causing the Bora to launch an all-out assault, which Jake defeats. Jake then escorts the defecting Bora leader to the GalSpan side, who urges the Bora to abandon their homes in the face of the unstoppable GalSpan to resettle further out in the frontier.

== Gameplay ==
Cockpit view

Tachyon: The Fringe is a first-person space combat simulator. Among several features, (such as power and shield management), the game implements "sliding", where the player can maintain a constant velocity while having free control over the orientation of their spacecraft. This is intended to provide an ease-of-motion where the player can strafe, fly backwards and otherwise maintain a higher level of control over their spacecraft.

=== Missions ===
In story mode, the player chooses missions from the Job Board. Some missions are offered by neutral parties and do not drive the main storyline (though they do occasionally affect the TNS News bulletins). Eventually, the story will reach a point where it becomes necessary for the player to ally with either the Bora Colonies or the Galactic Spanning Corporation. The Bora missions are usually higher in difficulty and less rewarding monetarily. GalSpan pays well and often has missions in tandem with other pilots, but is more morally grey. Since the two factions offer different fighters and different weapons, they encourage different play styles, as well as different storylines.

== Reception ==
Reception

Aggregate score
Aggregator	Score
GameRankings	78%

Review scores
Publication	Score
CNET Gamecenter	8/10
Computer Games Strategy Plus	4/5
Computer Gaming World	3/5
EP Daily	9/10
Eurogamer	7/10
GameRevolution	C
GameSpot	7.5/10
GameSpy	85%
IGN	8.4/10
Next Generation	3/5
PC Gamer (US)	82%

The game received favorable reviews according to the review aggregation website GameRankings. Kevin Rice of NextGen called it "a solid space-simulation game; it just doesn't offer much in the way of anything new." Nash Werner of GamePro said, "Even with a Hollywood name on the box to draw attention, Tachyon is still more like a treat for the hardcore space flight-sim fan. I'm talking about the type of fan that has the need to fly brand new ships every six months. Those people will love Tachyon. Its entertaining multiplayer mode over NovaWorld is reason enough to get fanboys everywhere salivating. However, casual gamers and tourists may not be able to appreciate Tachyon for what it really is: a very entertaining Privateer clone." (Note: GamePro gave the game two 4/5 scores for graphics and fun factor, and two 3.5/5 scores for sound and control.)

According to Mark Asher of CNET Gamecenter, the game was a commercial flop, with sales of 20,385 units and revenues of $778,095 in the U.S. by July 2000. He cited this performance as part of a trend of falling sales for space flight simulators and the wider flight simulator genre.

The staff of Computer Games Strategy Plus nominated the game for their 2000 "Sci-Fi Simulation of the Year" award, whose winner remains unknown. The Wargamer named it as the best general simulation game of 2000.

== See also ==
- List of space flight simulation games
