= Werewolf vs. Comanche =

1995 video game

- Developer: NovaLogic
- Publisher: NovaLogic
- Series: Comanche
- Platforms: MS-DOS, Classic Mac OS
- Release: 1995
- Genre: Combat flight simulation
- Modes: Single-player, multiplayer

Werewolf vs. Comanche is a video game developed and published by NovaLogic and released for MS-DOS and Classic Mac OS in 1995. It is a compilation of two separate games Werewolf and Comanche 2.0, an updated version of Comanche: Maximum Overkill. A standalone version of Comanche 2.0 was released in 1996.

== Gameplay ==
Werewolf vs. Comanche is a game in which the player can pilot the Comanche RAH-66 or the Werewolf KA-50.

== Reception ==
Reception

Review score
Publication	Score
Computer Gaming World	3.5/5

Next Generation reviewed the PC version of the game, rating it three stars out of five, and stated that "Controls are simple, and the action is nonstop. It could use a Super VGA mode, but all in all, this is one tidy package."

GameZone rated the game a 3 of 5 saying "All-in-all, this is still a very fun game to play. Those who want mega detailed simulations may want to steer clear of Werewolf vs Comanche (see Apache review). However, if you like jump-in seat-of-your pants flying, Werewolf vs Comanche may be for you. I know I will continue to play and enjoy Werewolf vs Comanche for some time to come. Now... if Novalogic's next release will only update their Voxel technology, we will be set!"

Computer Gaming World's Jack Rodrigues said: "Like its single-chopper predecessor, WEREWOLF VS. COMANCHE isn't for the flight-sim purist. But the simplicity that will make some hard-core sim fans scoff at the package will appeal to newcomers of helicopter sims, who are more interested in getting into the sky with a group of friends and blasting at anything that moves than getting an education in authentic tactics and rotor-wing physics."

== Reviews ==
- PC Gamer (December 1995)
- PC Player - Oct, 1995
- PC Games - Oct, 1995
