= Voxel Space =

Video game graphics engine

- Developers: NovaLogic, Kyle Freeman
- Type: 3D graphics engine
- Website: www.novalogic.com

Voxel Space was a voxel raster graphics rendering engine invented by NovaLogic developer and vice-president of technology, Kyle Freeman. The company was issued a patent for the technology in early 2000.

== History ==
The original Voxel Space engine was patented in 1996, and first released in software in the 1992 release Comanche: Maximum Overkill. The engine was then revamped into Voxel Space 2 (which supports the use of polygons as well as voxels, and was used in Comanche 3 and Armored Fist 2), and later Voxel Space 32 and used in Armored Fist 3 and Delta Force 2.

Based on Kyle Freeman's experience with voxels in medical-imaging technologies used in CT scan and MRI scanners, similar technology was used in games such as Outcast. With the advance of computation power in modern computers there do exist browser-based versions of similar technology based on the Voxel Space terrain rendering used in Comanche.

The version of the engine used in the Comanche series utilized ray-tracing every pixel of the volumetric terrain data.

== Versions ==
- Voxel Space 3D:
- Voxel Space 2:
- Voxel Space 32: 32-bit rendering, 16 million color support, 360 degrees of transformation.

== List of games ==
The technology was used in a number of commercial game titles:

- Werewolf
- Comanche series
- Delta Force series
