= Super Mario's Wacky Worlds =

Cancelled video game

- The first stage, Greek 1
- Developer: NovaLogic
- Publisher: Philips Interactive Media
- Designer: Marty Foulger
- Programmers: John Brooks; Silas Warner
- Artist: Nina Stanley
- Series: Mario
- Platform: Philips CD-i
- Genres: Adventure, platform
- Mode: Single-player

Super Mario's Wacky Worlds is a canceled Mario platform video game developed by NovaLogic for the CD-i format. The game was conceived as a sequel to Super Mario World, a game released for Super NES in 1990. An early prototype received positive feedback from Nintendo, but the game was soon canceled due to the declining sales of Philips's CD-i platform.

== Gameplay ==
As an incomplete pastiche of Super Mario World, Mario can only walk and jump. Enemies are not programmed correctly, as they disappear when Mario ends up above them, suggesting incomplete stomping implementation. Enemies cannot harm Mario; they are stopped if touched, even if it means floating in the air. Mario cannot die when he falls into a pit; instead, he floats on it.

Level progression can be pieced together by the selectable stages, with two or three levels per world. Each level has an exit such as a Warp Pipe, a Trojan Horse, or a stylized "M" object holding tape—some of which are non-functional, so the system must be restarted.

== Development ==
NovaLogic, the developer of Super Mario's Wacky Worlds, was hoping to be hired by Nintendo. Philips was developing Nintendo's Super NES CD-ROM peripheral; as part of that deal, the company had the right to use Nintendo's characters in its own games for its existing CD-i console. A Nintendo sales executive suggested to NovaLogic that a simplified style of Super NES games could be adapted to the CD-i; as such, they decided to demonstrate a follow-up to Super Mario World. Developers Silas Warner and John Brooks worked reportedly 24 hours a day for two weeks on the game, finishing only a part of one level to present to Nintendo. Nintendo was impressed; as a result of poor CD-i sales, they were forced to cancel the game. Multiple designers also left to work for Electronic Arts. This ended the CD-i career of Warner, who had expected Nintendo's reaction. Other developers such as lead artist Nina Stanley stayed with the project. Though the developers were highly enthusiastic about making a traditional Mario game (partly to establish their reputation surrounding Nintendo-licensed characters), NovaLogic hoped to use as little money as possible on the project. The company intended to make a small amount of profit while focusing on games such as the Comanche series. The game's final prototype is a pre-alpha at Version 0.11, finished on March 3, 1993, after one year of work. Approximately 80% of the game's art, 95% of its design, and around 30% of its code was finished. The prototype contains music taken from Super Mario World and no sound effects beside the jumping sound. This seems to be an early placeholder, as the idea for the final game was to take advantage of the disc format and use a flexible audio range rather than port unimproved synthesized sound.

Accurately capturing the sprites of Super Mario World was difficult for the Wacky Worlds development team, since the CD-i had a different sprite-making style than that of the SNES. To create their characters, they copied sprites of Mario and several Koopa Troopas from Super Mario World. Their original designs include a Greek Koopa, knight Koopa, Eskimo Koopa, vampire Koopa, and a walrus. The backgrounds were all hand-drawn, based on real-world locations.

Three prototypes are in circulation.

== Reception ==
Kombo wrote that the game paled in comparison to Sonic CD (1993), another platformer sequel released on a CD-based platform. He criticized the real-world setting as not befitting the "Wacky" monicker, suggesting that its cancelation helped avoid the laughingstock fate of other Nintendo-licensed games for CD-i, such as Hotel Mario (1994) and Zelda: The Wand of Gamelon (1993). GamesRadar writer Tom Goulter compared its quality to fan games, stating that while it was an impressive effort, the CD-i's limitations made it fortunate that it was never released. Joystiq's Justin McElroy said that the game would have been better off to have not been rediscovered. He said that the real-world settings were an odd choice and that it was not a worthy successor to Super Mario World. Digital Spy's Mark Langshaw said that the limited sprite count and the CD-i's pointer controls would have tarnished Super Mario World had it been released.
