= DFAF =

DFAF may refer to:

- Drug Free America Foundation
- Delta Force: Angel Falls
