= Delta Force: Angel Falls =

Cancelled tactical first-person shooter video game

- Developer: NovaLogic
- Publisher: NovaLogic
- Series: Delta Force
- Platform: Microsoft Windows
- Release: Cancelled
- Genre: Tactical shooter
- Modes: Single-player, multiplayer

Delta Force: Angel Falls is a cancelled tactical first-person shooter video game developed by NovaLogic for Microsoft Windows. It was to be a new installment in the Delta Force series. NovaLogic announced the game in February 2008, originally for release that year, and it was later rescheduled for 2009.

The game was planned to be set in Colombia and Venezuela, with a single-player component of 12 missions and a multiplayer component supporting up to 200 players. Development continued beyond the original release window, and NovaLogic sought applicants for an alpha test in 2011, but the game was never released. In 2016, THQ Nordic acquired NovaLogic's intellectual property, including the Delta Force franchise.

== Gameplay ==
Angel Falls was planned as a tactical first-person shooter emphasizing large environments, military operations and the use of ground, water and air vehicles. The single-player component was to consist of 12 missions divided into three campaigns.

The multiplayer component was to include 12 maps supporting up to 200 simultaneous players. The announced modes were Capture the flag, Deathmatch, Team Deathmatch and King of the Hill. Gamer.no reported that the multiplayer design would build on elements of NovaLogic's earlier game Joint Operations: Typhoon Rising.

== Setting ==
The game was to be set in Colombia and Venezuela, departing from several of the settings used in earlier Delta Force games. Its fictional near-future storyline centred on regional political instability, armed factions and drug cartels whose growing influence threatened established governments. The conflict was intended to culminate in the area surrounding Angel Falls in Venezuela. 4Gamer likewise described the player as fighting a large drug organisation.

== Development ==
=== Announcement ===
NovaLogic announced a new Delta Force game, Angel Falls, in February 2008, stating that it would be released that year. 4Gamer reported that the only information available at the time was a promotional image on NovaLogic's website. The image prompted speculation about the game's title and setting, and WorthPlaying noted that the project had been associated with the names Delta Force: Black Ops and Delta Force: Angel Falls during its early promotion.

In September 2008, the Czech distributor MTR Soft published information about Angel Falls, including its storyline, multiplayer capabilities and system requirements. The game was tentatively scheduled for July 2009. 4Gamer reported that further details had surfaced in a post on the fan forum Action-Inside, and also gave a planned release of July 2009. The Czech publication Games.cz observed that the limited promotion and the unusual disclosure of development details raised questions about whether the title would be a major production or a smaller-budget release.

In February 2009, 4Gamer described Angel Falls as scheduled for release during 2009, while noting speculation about a further new Delta Force title, Delta Force Xtreme X2.

=== Technology and alpha test ===
The game was to use a new engine, with an emphasis on large outdoor environments and updated graphics.

Development continued beyond the original release window. On 17 October 2011, DSOGaming reported that NovaLogic was accepting applications for an upcoming alpha-testing phase. The report stated that the game would use a new engine, focus on multiplayer and employ a system for distributing and updating test builds. No release date was available at that time.

== Reception ==
As the game was never released, it received no reviews; critical commentary was limited to pre-release previews. In September 2008, the French publication Génération Nouvelles Technologies discussed NovaLogic's attempt to modernize the series with a new graphics engine, contrasting the project's visual ambitions with perceived technical shortcomings in the material shown at the time.

In June 2009, Ignaty Kolysko of the Russian website StopGame questioned whether the series' established gameplay could remain competitive with contemporary shooters without substantial modernization. The preview criticized the graphics in promotional screenshots, unfavourably comparing some aspects to the original Far Cry, but described the water effects and shadows as more promising. Kolysko also expressed concern that the large-scale multiplayer component might appeal mainly to established fans of the series unless shortcomings in artificial intelligence, tactical depth and mission design were addressed.

== Cancellation ==
Angel Falls did not meet its proposed 2009 release window, and the planned alpha-testing phase did not lead to a commercial release.

On 31 October 2016, THQ Nordic announced the acquisition of NovaLogic's intellectual property, including the Delta Force, Comanche and Joint Operations franchises. Reporting on the acquisition, ComputerBase identified Angel Falls as a project announced in 2008 that had never reached the market. A 2021 retrospective by the preservation website Unseen64 documented the game as cancelled and noted that the extent of development completed before cancellation remained unclear.
