= Armored Fist 3 =

1999 video game

- Developer: NovaLogic
- Publisher: NovaLogic
- Producer: David Seeholzer
- Designer: Jerome K. Jones
- Programmer: Kent Simon
- Artists: Keith Rust; Jax Carroll
- Platform: Microsoft Windows
- Release: NA: September 30, 1999
- Genre: Tank simulator
- Modes: Single-player, multiplayer

Armored Fist 3 is a tank simulation video game developed and published by NovaLogic in 1999.

== Gameplay ==
It uses voxels, volumetric pixels, for in-game graphics, much like other Novalogic games such as Delta Force and the Comanche series of games. The game contains over 50 interlocking missions, and an in-game mission editor tool that allows players to create missions and share them over the internet.

== Reception ==
Reception

Aggregate score
Aggregator	Score
GameRankings	60%

Review scores
Publication	Score
AllGame	4/5
CNET Gamecenter	6/10
Computer Games Strategy Plus	2.5/5
Computer Gaming World	2/5
GamePro	3.5/5
GameSpot	5.6/10
GameZone	7/10
IGN	6.9/10
PC Accelerator	6/10
PC Gamer (US)	45%

The game received mixed reviews according to the review aggregation website GameRankings. GameSpot said, "As a single-player game, it's outdated, and as a multiplayer game, it lacks the variety to provide long-term enjoyment." IGN praised Novalogic for "straddling the difficult line between simulation and action", but criticized the use of voxel graphics.

AllGame was more positive than most reviews, praising the game's use of graphics and sounds to create an involving experience, stating "I was amazed at the detail of the 3D environments, the use of color, and the multiple camera angles available. You actually feel like you're in a tank. I like it. As realistic as the graphics are, sound is even better. The hum of the engine, the sound of metal on metal as the missiles load, and the whine of the swinging turret combine for a superb soundtrack. Good graphics can create a good simulation, but good sound completes it."

== See also ==
- Armored Fist
- Armored Fist 2
