= Highland Warriors =

2003 video game

- Developer: Soft Enterprises
- Publisher: Data Becker
- Platform: Microsoft Windows
- Release: NA: 20 January 2003; EU: 31 January 2003; UK: 14 February 2003
- Genres: Real-time strategy, history
- Modes: Single player, multiplayer

Highland Warriors is a real-time strategy video game developed by German studio Soft Enterprises and released for Microsoft Windows in January 2003. It takes place during the Middle Ages of the British history.

There are four major sections in the Highland Warriors' campaign:

- The unification of the clans under a single king.
- The conquest of Scotland by England.
- The rebellion of William Wallace and his uprising against the English army (during the 14th century)
- The reunification of the tribes by Robert the Bruce and the declaration of independence.

== Gameplay ==
Highland Warriors brings the traditional gameplay of a typical RTS game: The exploitation of the resources is necessary to build bases, which at their turn will allow to create armies and then attack the enemy to achieve victory. There are five types of natural resources: timber, food, stone, iron ore and gold.

Each side has different units. Beside the regular ones (infantry, cavalry, ranged, and siege units) some factions even have magic-using units, such as druids, mages, and rangers. Also, the game does not provide any information about the units, except for their price; so to judge a given unit, one would have to guess from its cost. One noticeable point, though, is Highland Warriors' gameplay feature known as "Blood Frenzy": in this mode, soldiers will spread and automatically attack closest enemies. The downside of this is that the player lose the control of any attacking units.

== Development ==
Highland Warriors was published in the UK and the rest of Europe by NovaLogic.

== Reception ==
The game was met with mixed reviews, holding a score of 58 on Metacritic. GameSpot states that its "historical accuracy doesn't compensate for the deficiencies in its gameplay and graphics."
