= Delta Force: Xtreme =

2005 video game

Delta Force Xtreme
- Developer: NovaLogic
- Publisher: NovaLogic
- Series: Delta Force
- Platform: Microsoft Windows
- Release: NA: April 21, 2005; EU: May 6, 2005
- Genre: First-person shooter
- Modes: Single-player, multiplayer

Delta Force: Xtreme is a 2005 budget first-person shooter video game developed and published by NovaLogic for Microsoft Windows. It is the seventh title (excluding console titles) of the Delta Force series. It acts as a partial remake of the original Delta Force, with numerous levels taken from it and redesigned.

The game is centered on three campaigns, focusing on eliminating a drug lord in Peru to eliminating rebels in Chad and Novoya Zemlya.

A sequel, Delta Force: Xtreme 2, was released in 2009.

== Gameplay ==
A screenshot of Delta Force: Xtreme

Delta Force: Xtreme focuses on three campaigns from Delta Force: Peru, Chad, and Novaya Zemlya. Between these three campaigns, the game is broken up into 60 different levels, and includes the option for coop throughout the campaign.

The game's single-player (unlike previous titles), introduces vehicular combat, but mostly on-foot combat to keep the balance. The game also features the "old style" scope that was present in the first four Delta Force titles. Game types (Deathmatch, Team Deathmatch, King of the Hill, etc.) from the original Delta Force have also been brought back.

== Reception ==
Reception

Aggregate score
Aggregator	Score
Metacritic	65/100

Review scores
Publication	Score
GameSpot	7.2/10
GameSpy	3/5
GameZone	8.5/10
PC Format	42%
PC Gamer (UK)	65%
PC Gamer (US)	58%
X-Play	3/5

Delta Force: Xtreme received "mixed" reviews according to video game review aggregator Metacritic.
