= MiG-29 Fulcrum (1998 video game) =

- Developer(s): NovaLogic
- Publisher(s): NovaLogic
- Platform(s): Microsoft Windows
- Release: NA: September 18, 1998
- Genre(s): Flight simulation

MiG-29 Fulcrum is a combat flight simulation game released by Novalogic in September 1998. It uses the same game engine as F-16 Multirole Fighter, and both were reissued together in 2001 as a double-disc edition named Jet Pack. The game was re-released in 2009 on Steam.
