= Delta Force (2025 video game) =

2025 video game

- Developer: Team Jade
- Publishers: TiMi Studio Group; Garena (Note: for Southeast Asia (alongside Taiwan), Latin America and MENA) (mobile and PC only)
- Directors: Shadow Guo; Leo Yao
- Designer: Ricky
- Programmer: Jason
- Artist: William Liu
- Series: Delta Force
- Engine: Unreal Engine 4 (multiplayer); Unreal Engine 5 (single-player; multiplayer from 2026)
- Platforms: Microsoft Windows; Android; iOS; PlayStation 5; Xbox Series X|S
- Release: Windows: January 20, 2025; 21 months ago Android, iOS; April 21, 2025; 18 months ago PS5, Xbox Series X/S; August 19, 2025; 14 months ago
- Genre: First-person shooter
- Modes: Single-player, multiplayer

Delta Force, formerly Delta Force: Hawk Ops, is a free-to-play first-person tactical shooter video game developed by Team Jade and published by TiMi Studio Group for Windows PC, iOS and Android devices, while the home consoles launch arrived in August 2025. It is part of the Delta Force series, previously developed and published by NovaLogic. The group also develops the game under its development division TiMi-J3, known for developing Call of Duty: Mobile.

Originally titled Delta Force, and amended to Delta Force: Hawk Ops, on August 20, 2024, the game's title was reverted to Delta Force. The game was launched on April 21, 2025, through mobile phones and PC and August 19, 2025, for PlayStation 5 and Xbox Series X|S.

== Gameplay ==
Players assume the role of military operators in the midst of a conflict between the Global Threat Initiative (GTI), a paramilitary organization, and Haavk, a progressive yet questionable international corporation.

The game is free to play with optional microtransactions, primarily consisting of cosmetics (including some crossovers). There are two primary game-modes, Warfare, a massive-scale multiplayer mode similar to Battlefield, and an extraction shooter mode known as Hazard Operations. Player progression is shared across different platforms with some limitations.

A gamemode has been introduced along with the 2nd anniversary update, called Detonation, on September 26 2026 for PC and mobile devices, a console version is scheduled for later in 2026. The gamemode features a 5v5 bomb detonation game based on existing operators and weapons, the gameplay is similar to video games such as CS2, and Valorant,and also introduced a 1v1 option for players to competed their skills with each other.

The game features a roster of playable operators who all unique abilities while fitting into one of four archetypes: Assault, Support, Engineer, and Recon - Assault focuses on frontline combat, Support focuses on maintain or enhancing allies, Engineers focus on vehicles and bolstering defenses, and Recon gathers information on hostiles.

== Plot ==
The game is set in 2035, when the government of the fictional North African country of Ahsarah partners with the technology corporation Haavk to solve an energy crisis. As Haavk expands its influence, the conservative nationalist Ahsarah Guard launches a rebellion, creating a three-way conflict between Haavk, the Guard, and the Global Threat Initiative (GTI), which intervenes to restore order.

Because the multiplayer announcers for each faction present contradictory accounts, the objectives and actions of all sides remain ambiguous, with each portraying its opponents negatively. Major developments are instead revealed through seasonal *Operations* missions and accompanying cutscenes.

GTI discovers that Haavk intends to use its Relink project, ostensibly designed to treat mental illness and brain injuries, to control users with Relink neural implants through an "Alpha" implant. Operative Zoya infiltrates Haavk's New Tower of Babel to persuade the project's lead scientist, Doctor Romulus, her former research partner, to defect. Romulus refuses, arguing that humanity must be controlled, and Zoya realises he has implanted the Alpha device in himself. Although GTI captures him and temporarily halts the project, he is later returned to Haavk in a prisoner exchange.

Haavk then activates Skynet, a satellite network capable of disabling GTI communications worldwide despite attempts to stop it. With GTI scattered, Zoya contacts Nox, a former Relink patient helping GTI remove his implant, and sends him to recover data needed to disable Skynet. The objective proves to be a trap; although Nox escapes a Haavk ambush, the mission fails.

GTI next sends Luna, Shepherd, and Stinger to free Raven, the exiled prince of Ahsarah and former leader of the Ahsarah Guard, from Haavk's Tide Prison. Raven incites a prison riot, drawing the attention of Haavk security agent Tempest. When Tempest and the GTI team reach Raven's cell, he releases hallucinogenic gas. Tempest and Luna recognise each other as former archery rivals, prompting Tempest to allow the operators to withdraw, though they must abandon the rescue.

After learning that the Ahsarah Guard plans to destroy the Haavk-built Zero Dam, now under its control, GTI deploys Gizmo and Uluru to defuse the explosives. Gizmo is captured and interrogated by militia leader Saeed, but convinces him that detonating the dam would make the Guard no better than Haavk. Saeed releases him and refuses to trigger the explosives, frustrating fellow Guard leader Reis.

D-Wolf and Zoya are then assigned to recover a Haavk MandelBrick containing Skynet data. They encounter Raptor, a bounty hunter and former GTI and Delta Force operative, who incapacitates Zoya before reluctantly joining D-Wolf to repel Haavk reinforcements. Raptor warns that GTI command should not be trusted with the MandelBrick and presumably sacrifices himself to cover their escape after seeing D-Wolf help an unconscious Zoya. Later, he interrupts a meeting between D-Wolf and his superiors and personally delivers the MandelBrick to D-Wolf.

Meanwhile, Haavk's orbital space stations are damaged by asteroids. Efficiency Director Hudson proposes using experimental dark matter generators to restore power in exchange for an unspecified favour, but Security Director Desmoulins rejects the plan to avoid risking Haavk's reputation. Afterward, Hudson secretly initiates a "plan B".

When the dark matter energy is transported aboard a cargo ship, GTI dispatches D-Wolf, Stinger, and newcomer Morse to gather evidence. During the mission, Morse follows a mysterious sound pulse that triggers memories of his time as a submariner, when the same phenomenon distracted him from intercepting a torpedo that killed his crew. Ignoring his failing tracker, he pursues the signal to the ship's command module but finds only a drone. With the vessel about to explode, he escapes by helicopter with Stinger's assistance. Afterwards, D-Wolf questions Morse about the unexplained 15-minute loss of contact, but Morse attributes it to his damaged tracker.

Afterward, GTI receives a distress call from an insider at Haavk's AZ3 nuclear power plant, Nasir, a prominent nuclear engineer, warning of an imminent nuclear disaster. Due to being short-staffed, GTI is forced to employ Gabriel Mercier, or "N-Two", for his experience as a nuclear engineer despite his mental illness. However, as GTI prepares to infiltrate AZ3, investigation and recollection reveals discrepancies between Nasir's alleged actions, revealing that Nasir has a twin brother, Monsir, who believes that drastic measures are needed to free Asharah from Haavk's grasp.

== Development ==
=== Black Hawk Down campaign ===
Inspired by the film Black Hawk Down (2001) by Ridley Scott and Delta Force: Black Hawk Down, the game features a single-player and cooperative mode as Task Force Ranger soldiers participating in Operation Gothic Serpent, with rights to Scott's footage and is closely based on the film. Tech demos of the campaign featured levels rendered in Unreal Engine 5, including the locations of the raid which led to the Battle of Mogadishu.

=== Release ===
Delta Force open-beta released for PC on December 5, 2024. For iOS and Android, Delta Force launched on April 21, 2025. For PlayStation 5 and Xbox Series X|S, Delta Force launched on August 19, 2025.

=== Collaboration ===
Delta Force has collaborated with Norwegian DJ Alan Walker, the mobile game Arknights, the Saw series, the action-adventure game Tomb Raider, among many others. Recent collaboration announcements include the Tom Clancy's Rainbow Six Siege collaboration, including a Doc Skin for Stinger, a Vigil skin for Nox and a Montagne skin for Sineva.

== Reception ==
Delta Force received "mixed or average" reviews from critics, according to review aggregator website Metacritic.

Justin Koreis from IGN felt that the game was competent and wrote that Delta Force was "both a good large-scale PvP shooter and a serviceable extraction shooter, even if neither half stands out". Rick Lane from Eurogamer also praised Warfare and Operations, describing them as "meticulously designed and undeniably entertaining", though he lamented that the game was not innovative and too conservative in its design. However, he strongly criticized the Black Hawk Down campaign, calling it "atrocious" and adding that it was nearly impossible to play the campaign alone.

=== Accolades ===
Year	Award	Category	Recipient(s) and nominee(s)	Result	Ref(s).
2024	15th Hollywood Music in Media Awards	Best Score – Video Game (Console & PC)	Johan Söderqvist, Edwin, Zio, Jason H, LUMi	Won	
2024	15th Hollywood Music in Media Awards	Best Song – Video Game (Console & PC)	"Dawn", "Eternity"	Nominated	
2024	15th Hollywood Music in Media Awards	Best Music Supervision - Video Game	Sam Yang	Nominated	
2025	23rd Game Audio Network Guild Awards	Best UI, Reward, or Objective Sound Design	Delta Force	Nominated	
2025	23rd Game Audio Network Guild Awards	Creative and Technical Achievement in Sound Design	Delta Force	Won (Note: Tied with Final Fantasy VII Rebirth)	
2025	15th Guild of Music Supervisors Awards	Best Music Supervision in a Video Game (Original Music)	Sam Yang	Nominated	
2025	16th Hollywood Music in Media Awards	Best Song/Score – Mobile Video Game	Delta Force Music Team	Nominated	
2025	16th Hollywood Music in Media Awards	Best Music Design – Trailer	Peter Tomlinson	Nominated	
2025	NAVGTR Awards	Best Song, Original or Adapted	"Dawn"	Nominated	
