= Delta Force: Task Force Dagger =

- Developer: Zombie Inc.
- Publisher: NovaLogic
- Series: Delta Force
- Engine: Voxel Space
- Platform: Windows
- Release: NA: June 26, 2002; UK: July 19, 2002
- Genre: First-person shooter
- Modes: Single-player, multiplayer

Delta Force: Task Force Dagger is a 2002 first-person shooter video game developed by Zombie Studios and published by NovaLogic for Microsoft Windows. It is a standalone expansion pack to Delta Force: Land Warrior. It is set in Afghanistan in 2002 after United States invasion of the Islamic Emirate of Afghanistan in 2001.

== Gameplay ==
Task Force Dagger is based on the same engine as the previous Delta Force title, Land Warrior, and retains all of its gameplay mechanics. The largest difference is that the player can now choose to control a character from either one of ten available special operation units, including SEAL Team Six, the Green Berets and the Special Air Service. All of these have individual advantages and disadvantages, such as some operatives being formidable snipers while others are able to sustain larger amounts of damage. However, mechanically these factions are identical to the different playable Delta Force operatives available in Land Warrior. Unlike the earlier games, Task Force Dagger usually sends the player on missions alone, without any support from AI-controlled friendly soldiers.

Like all earlier Delta Force titles, Task Force Dagger has a larger focus on realism than is common in the first person shooter genre. Most of the gameplay takes place in large outdoor environments with combat distances of up to several hundred meters, and bullet ballistics have to be taken into account when aiming at distant targets. Typically for the series, characters usually die from a single hit. Like Land Warrior, Task Force Dagger also prominently features combat in narrow tunnels.

As before, the missions are comparably open-ended, only requiring the player to fulfill specific objectives while allowing him to maneuver freely on the maps. Objectives usually involve eliminating all hostile presence in an area or destroying military equipment such as SCUD launchers and ammunition depots. Before each mission the player is able to customise their weapon loadout but can later replace weapons with ones dropped by killed characters or access weapons caches to re-equip himself on-mission. Despite being a stand-alone expansion, the game almost features just as many levels as its parent game, Land Warrior, with 25 missions in total, not counting the introductory tutorial.

== Map editor ==
The game package includes a Mission Editor that gives the player the ability to create their own singleplayer or multiplayer maps for other users to play in.

== Reception ==
Reception

Aggregate score
Aggregator	Score
Metacritic	51/100

Review scores
Publication	Score
GameSpot	4.2/10
GameSpy	3/5
GameZone	8/10
IGN	6/10
PC Gamer (US)	38%
PC Zone	44%

The game received "mixed" reviews according to video game review aggregator Metacritic.

Daniel Morris of PC Gamer noted the dull AI and dated graphics, and ended his review by stating, "But I just don't understand how you can plop down the money for Task Force Dagger when there are so many better games in this niche of the genre."
