= Delta Force: Urban Warfare =

2002 video game

- Developer: Rebellion Developments
- Publisher: NovaLogic
- Producer: Emerson Best
- Composers: Tom Bible; Ken Turner
- Series: Delta Force
- Platform: PlayStation
- Release: NA: 2 July 2002; EU: 9 August 2002
- Genre: Tactical first-person shooter
- Mode: Single player

Delta Force: Urban Warfare is a 2002 tactical first-person shooter game developed by Rebellion Developments and published by NovaLogic for the PlayStation. It is part of the Delta Force series. The game was re-released in 2010 for the PlayStation 3 and PlayStation Portable via PlayStation Network.

== Plot ==
The game tells the story of a Delta Force operative named John Carter who had taken part in a failed drug deal bust in Tumaco, Colombia, and was subsequently sent undercover by CIA agent Robert Jackson to capture or kill the involved drug lord and red mercury smuggler Malik.

== Gameplay ==
It was designed to be a military simulation loosely based on the Delta Force special operations force. The storyline spans twelve missions, including a bank robbery, hostage rescue, and an assault on an offshore oil rig.

The game features a greater emphasis on story than previous Delta Force games, as it features fully animated and voice-acted cutscenes in between missions. Its missions are also less vast and open than other titles in the franchise, focusing instead on a more scripted and linear play style, in tight urban environments.

== Reception ==
Reception

Aggregate score
Aggregator	Score
Metacritic	70/100

Review scores
Publication	Score
Computer and Video Games	6/10
Electronic Gaming Monthly	7/10
Eurogamer	6/10
Official U.S. PlayStation Magazine	3/5

The game received "average" reviews according to video game review aggregator Metacritic.
