= Joint Operations: Typhoon Rising =

2004 video game

- Developer: NovaLogic
- Publishers: NovaLogic; MicroMouse Co., Ltd.
- Director: John A. Garcia
- Producer: Joel Taubel
- Designer: Brent Houston
- Programmers: Mark Davis; Kyle Freeman; Kent Simon
- Artist: Chris Tamburrino
- Composers: Russell Brower; Paul M. Fox
- Platform: Microsoft Windows
- Release: NA: June 15, 2004; EU: June 25, 2004
- Genre: First-person shooter
- Modes: Multiplayer, co-op

Joint Operations: Typhoon Rising is a 2004 first-person shooter computer game from Novalogic that focuses almost entirely on its expansive online multiplayer mode. Set in Indonesia in the near future, Joint Operations takes the player to a country on the verge of disintegration. Regional independence movements have acquired advanced weaponry as the nation's military splits into competing factions. Escalating violence threatens innocent civilians and Western economic interests. Developed using the Black Hawk Down engine, Joint Operations promises superior rendering technology and an enhanced 3rd generation multiplayer experience.

== Gameplay ==
Although the game contains a series of single player training missions and operations accessible under the main page option "Missions", most players utilize the game's multiplayer option to compete online under the main page option "Novaworld" which connects the player to Novalogic's online gaming environment, Novaworld. Each Joint Operations server at Novaworld has the potential to hold up to 150 players, based on server bandwidth capacity, making the game a Massive Multiplayer Online First Person Shooter. Although a number of these servers are run by Novalogic, anyone with a PC and sufficient internet bandwidth can host a server, with a player limit of up to 64 people. Many independent servers exist, hosted by individuals or groups of players who form clans.

In a separate map screen, the team leader can give orders and set up waypoints.

In the multiplayer setting, the game has five modes, which dictate how gameplay proceeds on any given map:

- Coop: All players are on the Joint Operations side and fight against a rebel artificial intelligence team.
- Advance And Secure: Both teams try to capture and hold all the bases on the maps before time runs out.
- Team King of the Hill: The teams try to occupy a small zone on the map for ten minutes to win.
- Deathmatch: A kill limit is imposed, and all players operate independently seeking to kill other players to reach that goal before the clock runs out.
- Team Deathmatch: A kill limit is imposed, and both teams try to kill players on the opposing team to reach that goal before the clock runs out.

== Teams ==
=== Joint Operations (Blue Team) ===
The Joint Operations Task Force is an international assistance force that is under the command of the fictional "Coalition of Nations", which was formed before 1999, made up of elite special operations personnel from the United States, United Kingdom, Germany, France, Russia, Australia and Indonesia. The Task Force was previously employed in peacekeeping operations in East Timor. After requests from the Indonesian government, the Task Force was sent to the country as part of Operation Typhoon Rising, to stop the rebellion and re-establish government control over rebel-controlled territories.

=== Rebels (Red Team) ===
The Indonesian Separatist Movement grew out of the 1998 Indonesian Revolution which saw the downfall of Indonesian President Suharto. The rebels fight for varied reasons in their desire to attain independence of certain provinces, as well as to protect their people against the government. The instruction manual for the game states that the Rebels feel that they have been the victims of unfair and inhumane treatment at the hands of the Indonesian military and government. Joint Operations forces were sent to Indonesia to combat the rebel threat after three bombs were detonated by the Rebels, with one destroying part of a school, one destroying a government building in Jakarta, and one that nearly killed the Indonesian president. Recently, factions of the military started to join the movement resulting in the rebels taking control of several military bases and capturing large numbers of weapons and vehicles.

== Expansion pack ==
Cover art for Joint Operations: Escalation

On November 19, 2004, Novalogic released an expansion pack, Joint Operations: Escalation. The expansion pack was not a stand-alone release and required the original game be installed first prior to use. Escalation introduced new maps, weapons, and vehicles while focusing on an expansion of the conflict to other areas in Southeast Asia. Players had the option to use parachutes to jump out of helicopters or from elevated map locations.

In October 2005, Novalogic released both Typhoon Rising and Escalation as a compilation set called Joint Operations: Combined Arms which made it possible to buy both games in a single boxed product. This was done as a marketing move by the game manufacturer and there is no difference in game play between a player who owns Joint Operations: Combined Arms and a player who owns separate copies of both Joint Operations: Typhoon Rising and Joint Operations: Escalation.

On August 11, 2009 Navarre Corporation re-released the compilation as Joint Ops: Combined Arms Gold.

== Reception ==
=== Typhoon Rising ===
Joint Operations: Typhoon Rising

Aggregate score
Aggregator	Score
Metacritic	82/100

Review scores
Publication	Score
1Up.com	B−
Computer Gaming World	4.5/5
Game Informer	8.5/10
GamePro	5/5
GameRevolution	B+
GameSpot	8.2/10
GameSpy	4.5/5
GameZone	8.8/10
IGN	7.6/10
PC Gamer (US)	85%
The New York Times	(average)

Typhoon Rising received "favorable" reviews according to video game review aggregator Metacritic.

Joint Operations was a runner-up for Computer Games Magazine's 2004 "Best Multiplayer" award, which ultimately went to Unreal Tournament 2004. During the 8th Annual Interactive Achievement Awards, the Academy of Interactive Arts & Sciences nominated Typhoon Rising for "Computer First-Person Action Game of the Year", which was ultimately awarded to Half-Life 2.

=== Escalation ===
Joint Operations: Escalation

Aggregate score
Aggregator	Score
Metacritic	78/100

Review scores
Publication	Score
Computer Gaming World	4/5
Game Informer	8/10
GameSpot	7.6/10
GameSpy	3.5/5
IGN	8.3/10
PC Gamer (US)	78%

The expansion pack Escalation also received "favorable" reviews (though not as much as the original Joint Operations) according to Metacritic.
