= Hotel Mario =

1994 puzzle video game

- Developer: Fantasy Factory
- Publisher: Philips Interactive Media
- Producer: Michael Ahn
- Designer: Stephen Radosh
- Artists: Jeff Zoern; Mirena Kim
- Composers: Marc St. Regis; Jack Levy
- Series: Mario
- Platform: Philips CD-i
- Release: July 1994
- Genre: Puzzle
- Modes: Single-player, multiplayer

Hotel Mario is a 1994 puzzle video game developed by Fantasy Factory and published by Philips Interactive Media for the Philips CD-i. The player controls Mario, who must find Princess Toadstool by going through seven hotels in the Mushroom Kingdom. Each hotel is divided into stages, and the objective is to close all of the doors on each stage. Each hotel ends in a boss fight with one of Bowser's Koopalings, culminating in a battle with Bowser.

Hotel Mario was one of four games featuring Nintendo characters published for the CD-i; the others were three Legend of Zelda games. Another Mario game, Super Mario's Wacky Worlds, was never released while a third game, Mario Takes America was planned but eventually canceled. Nintendo licensed the characters after not going forward with a deal for Philips to create a CD-ROM add-on for the Super NES.

Hotel Mario initially received mixed reviews; critics felt it was fun but had no lasting appeal. It has been retrospectively described as one of the worst video games, receiving criticism for its door-closing game mechanic, unresponsive controls, voice acting, and full-motion video cutscenes.

== Gameplay ==
A stage in the first hotel

Hotel Mario is a single-screen puzzle video game. Controlling Mario, or his brother Luigi in two-player mode, the player must search the Klub Koopa Resort for Princess Toadstool, who has been kidnapped by Bowser.

The game consists of seven hotels, which each feature several stages. The player must shut every door in the stage by moving up and down elevators and avoiding enemies. Mario can step on most enemies, as in previous games, but some must be avoided by changing floors or entering an open door. At the end of each hotel, the player engages in a boss fight with a Koopaling; in the final hotel, the player battles Bowser. The game features various power-ups: the Super Mushroom allows Mario to take multiple hits, the Star Man makes him temporarily invincible, and the Fire Flower allows him to throw fireballs.

== Plot ==
Mario and Luigi arrive at the Mushroom Kingdom after having been invited for a picnic by Princess Toadstool, only to discover that the kingdom has been taken over by Bowser and renamed the "Klub Koopa Resort". Mario discovers in a letter left for them by Bowser that he and his Koopalings have turned the kingdom into their personal vacation resort and that they have established seven different hotels that act as their bases of operation. Along with this, Bowser has kidnapped Princess Toadstool and imprisoned her in one of the hotels as a "permanent guest". Mario and Luigi then venture into the Mushroom Kingdom with the assistance of the player.

As Mario and Luigi continue their quest, they defeat the Koopalings along with their hotels such as Morton's Wood Door Hysteria Hotel; Roy's HardBrick Hotel; Larry's Chillton Hotel; Lemmy's High-ate Regency Hotel; Ludwig's Thump Castle Hotel; and Wendy's Blitz Snarlton Hotel. Along the way, they manage to rescue the princess every time, only for her to be recaptured immediately. Mario and Luigi make it to Bowser's Seizures Palace Hotel where they first fight Iggy (who works at Bowser's hotel instead of running his own) before they confront and defeat Bowser himself. Afterwards, Mario, Luigi and the princess flee the hotel as it falls to rubble, allowing peace to be restored to the Mushroom Kingdom. Princess Toadstool thanks Mario and Luigi for liberating the kingdom and gives them a kiss before she personally thanks the player. As the trio walks off into the sunset, they bid farewell to the player, thanking them for their contributions.

== Development ==
In 1989, Nintendo and Sony agreed to develop a CD-ROM-based add-on for the Super NES (see Super NES CD-ROM), that would allow for full motion video (FMV) and larger games. However, Nintendo instead signed with Philips to make the add-on, and Sony redesigned their console as the PlayStation. By 1993, Nintendo had abandoned plans for the add-on. As part of dissolving the agreement, Nintendo licensed Philips to use some Nintendo characters for their CD-i console, resulting in three Legend of Zelda games as well as Hotel Mario. Another Mario game, Super Mario's Wacky Worlds, was canceled at the prototype stage. According to Stephen Radosh, Nintendo's only involvement in the development was ensuring that the source material was faithful to the Mario series. Nintendo was reported to be pleased with the finished project and Radosh stated that there were rumors that Nintendo considered bringing the game to their own platforms.

Hotel Mario was developed by Fantasy Factory. Radosh had a concept for a video game that took place in a hotel with various stages and decided to incorporate it into Fantasy Factory's Mario project. The developers and testers tended to be older in age; in an interview with The Black Moon Project, background artist Trici Venola noted one tester was "well past retirement". Since the target audience of children would have faster reflexes, the game was designed to play well for the testers, then sped up. Hotel Mario uses FMV cutscenes to tell its story. The cutscenes were outsourced to Ocatillo Pictures, animated by Terry O'Brien, Kathleen Swain and Bonita Versh. Feeling an early version was "mechanical" and "visually no fun", Venola and art director Jeff Zoern used elements from Disney and J. R. R. Tolkien to enhance the visual style. Illustrations of the stages were composed of several blocks, each with one detail. The first item that Venola created for all hotels was the door. Each building took a week to complete and was designed with a specific theme; for instance, Bowser's hotel uses a gothic design. A "cheese hotel" was proposed during the concept phase and had concept artwork drawn for it, but the development team refused the idea, with Venola calling it "awful", and the artist responsible for it was fired. The game's music was composed by Marc St. Regis. Sound designer and production assistant Jack Levy co-produced alternate versions of the songs. For voice acting, Marc Graue provided the voices of the Mario Brothers and Bowser, while Princess Toadstool was voiced by Jocelyn Benford. Graue was hired through an agency, while Benford was recommended by an employee of Philips Media. She would later marry Michael Ahn, who was one of the producers of Hotel Mario.

Initially, jumping was not going to be a feature of Hotel Mario. According to Stephen Radosh, jumping was added after a suggestion from Hollie Lohff, the daughter of one of the engineers, Thomas Lohff. She played Hotel Mario before its release, and criticized it for not allowing jumping like previous Mario games did.

== Reception ==
Reception

Review scores
Publication	Score
Computer and Video Games	67/100
Electronic Gaming Monthly	8/10, 6/10, 6/10, 6/10, 7/10
GamePro	2.5/5
Joystick	65/100 (Note: Hotel Mario was given two ratings by Joystick: 60 for "Technique" and 70 for "Interest".)
Superjuegos	87/100
VideoGames & Computer Entertainment	7/10
CDi	90%

Hotel Mario initially received mixed reviews. Electronic Gaming Monthly described its gameplay as simple yet addictive. GamePro said the game was fun but quickly grew boring and stated that "the only intriguing aspects of this game are the well-fashioned animated sequences". Video Games: The Ultimate Gaming Magazine gave the game 7 out of 10 but acknowledged its difficulty. Spanish magazine Superjuegos praised the game's simple mechanics and recommended the game to CD-i owners.

Hotel Mario has since been described as one of the worst Mario games. IGN's Levi Buchanan said that while it was superior to Philips' The Legend of Zelda games, closing doors was not "a strong enough hook for an entire game", and J.C. Fletcher of Joystiq ridiculed the plot: "Apparently Bowser has nefariously plotted to have his underlings open doors in ... his own hotels, thus wasting air conditioning and increasing his own electric bill. Mario and Luigi must heroically latch all the doors and save their archenemy from having his hallways get too cold." GamesRadar described it as "craptastic", and Eurogamer as "little more than a really rubbish version of Elevator Action". The controls have been criticized as unresponsive.

The cutscenes have been widely criticized. 1UP.com described them as "outright terrifying", and IGN called them "abysmal", resembling "a bad flip-book of images printed out of Microsoft Paint". Joystiq described them as "amateurish, garishly colorful, shaky, randomly zooming animation". The voice acting was also criticized; both 1UP.com and IGN found Mario voice actor Marc Graue's performance ill-fitting for the character and lacking the playfulness of Mario's voice artist at the time Charles Martinet. Danny Cowan of 1UP wrote: "Mario sounds more like someone's ex-smoker grandpa trying to imitate a Mafia hit man... The dialogue is meant to sound playful, but the character voices imply acts of menace and hate." In 2008, IGN named Hotel Mario one of the ten worst Mario games. In 2017, GamesRadar ranked Hotel Mario 48th on their "The 50 Worst Games of All Time" list.

== Legacy ==
In the mid to late 2000s, Hotel Mario's cutscenes gained notoriety as Internet memes and endured as one of the most common sources for YouTube Poop video mashups. Marc Graue reprised his roles as Mario and Luigi in a parody dub in late 2011. In 2024, a fan remake of the game with several quality of life enhancements, titled Hotel Mario ReBooked, was announced to be in development.
