= Ultrabots =

1993 video game

- Developer: NovaLogic
- Publisher: Electronic Arts
- Producer: Paul Grace
- Designers: John Butrovich; David Seeholzer; John A. Garcia
- Programmer: Scott Cronce
- Composer: Stewart Perkins
- Platform: MS-DOS
- Release: March 1993
- Genres: First-person shooter Vehicle simulation
- Mode: Single-player

Ultrabots (called Xenobots in Europe) is a first-person shooter video game developed by NovaLogic for MS-DOS and published by Electronic Arts in 1993. The player controls a group of giant robots and battles other giant robots.

== Gameplay ==
Cockpit view

Gameplay consists of deploying a group of robots to an area and engaging enemy forces. Both sides will typically have a number of robots and a base to protect. Damaged robots can return to the base for repairs. As robots take damage, they will become harder to control and use as various systems fail.

The user can take direct control of one of the robots in field at will, or leave them autonomous in field and provide only strategic goal-driven control from the base.

=== Robots ===
There are three types of robots available in the game:

1. Humanoid is the main fighting robot. It is the strongest robot available and can deliver and take the most damage.
2. Scorpion (or, Net Builder) is the infrastructure maintenance robot. It is slow, fragile, and weak in close combat, but it carries a single-shot missile (its scorpion stinging tail) that is the heaviest weapon in the game. Only Scorpions can lay down or dismantle the power grid.
3. Scout is the fast agile robot used for recon. It is lightly armed, but has the longest range when running on batteries, and is capable of laying mines.

=== Power grid ===
A power grid consisting of microwave relays extends power away from the base dome. Robots straying too far from the base dome or relays have to rely on their batteries only, which don't last long and don't offer enough range to reach the enemy base. Much of the strategy in this game relies on the power infrastructure, with Scorpions extending lines of relays toward the enemy that Scouts discover far from the grid, under protection of Humanoids, to prepare a full attack on the enemy base.

== Development and release ==
Ultrabots was developed by California-based Novalogic. The game was originally announced in early 1992 under the title Ultrabots: Sanction Earth and was to be published by Data East for both the PC and Super Nintendo Entertainment System (SNES). The latter version was cancelled and the publication rights to the PC version were acquired by Electronic Arts later that same year.

== Reception ==
Reception

Review score
Publication	Score
Computer Gaming World	2.5/5

Computer Gaming World called Ultrabots "a very novel and worthwhile experience". A 1994 survey of strategic space games set in the year 2000 and later gave the game two-plus stars out of five, stating that "Any similarity to Mechwarriors is superficial".
