= F-16 Multirole Fighter =

1998 video game

- Developer(s): NovaLogic
- Publisher(s): NovaLogic
- Platform(s): Microsoft Windows
- Release: September 18, 1998
- Genre(s): Flight simulator

F-16 Multirole Fighter is a combat flight simulation game, released by NovaLogic in 1998. It focuses on the F-16 Fighting Falcon, and uses the same game engine as MiG-29 Fulcrum; both were reissued together in 2001 as a double-disc edition named Jet Pack. It was re-released in 2009 on Steam.

== Gameplay ==
Being a simulation, F-16 Multirole Fighter is reasonably accurate, especially when compared to most console arcade-style games such as Namco's Ace Combat series and Konami's Airforce Delta series. Features such as limited ammunition quantity (important to consider when playing through campaigns), fuel levels, and many flight characteristics come into play. The player must quickly learn to compensate for other events such as engine flameouts, flatspins, red- and blackouts (affected by the g-forces).

== Campaigns ==
The campaigns in F-16 Multirole Fighter vary and take place across the globe; featuring locations such as Serbia, Burma, Liberia, Somalia and the Democratic Republic of Congo.
