= Advance and secure =

Video game mode

Advance and secure often just AAS is player versus player team based game mode used in a few hardcore, tactical and milsim first-person shooter games. Players on opposing teams try to capture certain predefined points of interest in a game environment in a certain preset order.

== Basic concept ==
Players in both teams have to capture a number of bases or zones. The winning team is the one that has most bases under control when the time or tickets runs out.

== History ==
Advance and secure was first introduced in the game Joint Operations: Typhoon Rising. While advance and secure is somewhat similar to Battlefield game series Conquest game mode, it does naturally promote more teamwork and strategy compared to Battlefields more open ended Conquest mode. The original Joint Operations: Typhoon Rising AAS mode also shares some similarities with Team Fortress Classic Control Point game mode.

== Structure in different games ==
=== ArmA ===
The ArmA community has modded a Joint Operations style AAS game mode since ArmA I.

=== Joint Operations: Typhoon Rising ===
In advance and secure mode in Joint Operations: Typhoon Rising and its expansion titled Joint Operations: Escalation the AAS game mode is the same.

It is based on round capturing zones which can vary in size individually from tiny only few square meters to big 0,95 square kilometers in size, from meters in diameter to hundreds of meters in diameter depending the map designers decisions. In the middle of each zone is spawn point, where players can spawn if the zone is controlled by own team in other words is fully captured (From game, Joint Operations: Typhoon Rising / Escalation).

The capturing zones can overlap and form sectors where one player can affect several zones simultaneously making such sectors strategically valuable, this overlapping is seen in some stock maps.

=== Project Reality:BF2 ===
Community made Project Reality modification for Battlefield 2 have its own modified version of advance and secure game mode. It uses the same basic idea of predefined capturing order, but instead of capturing bases, a player captures zones since the size of zones are normally big from 100 meters to 300 meters in radius. This forces a player to control an area before capturing the flag instead of just controlling a single building. One difference is that part of the zones can be randomly chosen at the start of the round, which add replay value to maps. Major difference to Joint Operations AAS mode is that the zone doesn't have rigid spawn point middle of the zone, instead the spawn points are player deployable assets.
