= Delta Force 2 =

1999 video game

- Developer: NovaLogic
- Publisher: NovaLogic
- Producer: Wes Eckhart
- Designer: Steve McNally
- Programmer: Daniele Gaetano
- Artists: Keith Rust; Rod Parong
- Composers: Tom Hays; Eric Kuehnl
- Series: Delta Force
- Engine: Voxel Space
- Platform: Microsoft Windows
- Release: NA: November 3, 1999; PAL: February 25, 2000
- Genre: Tactical first-person shooter
- Modes: Single-player, multiplayer

Delta Force 2 is a tactical first-person shooter video game developed by NovaLogic and released in 1999, one year after its predecessor. It is the second game in the Delta Force series and was followed by Delta Force: Land Warrior one year later. The game was re-released in 2009 on Steam.

== Gameplay ==
First-person view while lying prone on top of a truck

The player assumes the role of a Delta Force operative who takes part in missions across the globe. The action takes place in vast outdoor environments and combat distances reach up to several hundred meters. The game has an emphasis on realism, with human enemies and the player alike being very vulnerable to damage from weapons, and projectiles being subject to wind conditions.

Missions consist of a series of objectives while navigation points indicate what to do, the player is free to approach the targets as he sees fit. Objectives typically involve eliminating all hostile presence in a specific location, rescuing hostages, or destroying enemy vehicles and facilities. Many missions feature allied Delta Force teams which follow commands predefined by the mission design, and who can also be issued orders by the player. The player can view the positions of nearby enemies and friendly units through the use of a minimap on their HUD.

=== Game engine ===
The game continues to use NovaLogic's proprietary Voxel Space engine from its earlier games, including the original Delta Force and the Comanche series of helicopter combat simulators, known for its ability to render vast landscapes. This updated version of the engine is dubbed Voxel Space 32, as it is optimised for 32-bit graphics cards and does not support 16-bit cards anymore. All terrain is visualised by voxels while any characters, vehicles, structures or other details are polygonal. Unlike its predecessor, Delta Force 2 supports hardware acceleration. A new feature in Delta Force 2's version of the engine are stretched voxels which allow to simulate high grass, capable of masking characters at any distance.

A view of the voxel terrain taken while parachuting

=== Mission editor ===
The game includes a mission editor which allows the user to place objects, enemies, and objectives in one of the game's existing landscapes.

== Reception ==
Reception

Aggregate score
Aggregator	Score
GameRankings	73%

Review scores
Publication	Score
AllGame	4/5
CNET Gamecenter	4/10
Computer Games Strategy Plus	3/5
Computer Gaming World	2/5
EP Daily	7/10
Eurogamer	8/10
GamePro	4/5
GameRevolution	B
GameSpot	8.2/10
IGN	7.5/10
Next Generation	3/5
PC Accelerator	7/10
PC Gamer (US)	74%

The game received "average" reviews according to video game review aggregator GameRankings. Computer Gaming World's Brett Todd criticised the game for "abysmal graphics", non-existent sound effects and a lack of background information on the missions. He also criticised the need to carefully scan the screen for small enemies in the distance as well as the game's poor performance, forcing the player to play on a small resolution even on high-end hardware and further worsening the trouble with spotting enemies. He praised the mission design and multiplayer mode for up to 50 players, however. GameSpot's Michael E. Ryan was more enthusiastic. He particularly praised the mission design, calling it "generally excellent" and noting that the missions are usually "realistic and believable", with some exceptions more inspired by action films. He also praised the game's multiplayer mode and the sound design. Eric Bratcher of NextGen said of the game, "Not quite as tense or pretty as Rainbow Six, this is still a great game for Green Beret wanna-bes." PC Gamer's Gordon Goble remarked, "Delta Force 2, while not all it should have been, remains an intriguing slice of tactical action that should please most fans of the genre."

The game received a "Silver" sales award from the Entertainment and Leisure Software Publishers Association (ELSPA), indicating sales of at least 100,000 units in the UK.
