= Tarisland =

- Developers: Level Infinite; Locojoy
- Publisher: Tencent
- Platforms: Windows iOS; Android
- Release: 21 June 2024

Tarisland, also known as Tarisland: Mystery of the Hollows, was a massively multiplayer online role-playing game, developed by Level Infinite and published by Tencent, that was released on 21 June 2024. The game is available on Android, iOS and Microsoft Windows. The game includes cross-platform play and cross-platform progression. Tarisland has nine playable classes.

== End of Service ==
On 4 Sept 2025, Tarisland announced they would end service on 4 Nov 2025.
