= Armored Fist 2 =

1997 video game

- Developer: NovaLogic
- Publisher: NovaLogic
- Designer: Kent Simon
- Programmer: Kent Simon
- Artist: Keith Rust
- Composer: James Donnellan
- Series: Armored Fist
- Platform: MS-DOS
- Release: October 6, 1997
- Genre: Tank simulator
- Modes: Single-player, multiplayer

Armored Fist 2 is a video game developed and published by NovaLogic for MS-DOS in 1997.

== Gameplay ==
Armored Fist 2 is a tank simulation and strategy game with more than 50 missions in Europe, Asia, Africa, and the Middle East.

== Development ==
To promote the game NovaLogic let 12 journalists compare simulated tanks with the real thing.

== Reception ==
Reception

Review score
Publication	Score
PC Gamer	34%

Armored Fist 2 was the best-selling simulation of tank warfare released in 1997. In the United States, it sold 26,961 copies and earned $1.21 million that year.

== See also ==
- Armored Fist
- Armored Fist 3
