= F-22 Lightning II =

1996 video game

- Developer: NovaLogic
- Publisher: NovaLogic
- Platform: DOS
- Release: NA: September 25, 1996; EU: 1996
- Genres: Action, Simulation

F-22 Lightning II is a video game developed and published by NovaLogic for DOS. It is the first game in NovaLogic's F-22 series. A follow-up, F-22 Raptor, was released in 1997. A third and final game in the series, F-22 Lightning 3, was released in 1999.

== Gameplay ==
F-22 Lightning II is a game in which the player pilots the U.S. Air Force F-22 experimental fighter.

== Reception ==
Next Generation reviewed the PC version of the game, rating it two stars out of five, and stated that "There are lots of interesting missions, and the flexible multi-player options are a real treat, but at the end of the day, F-22 doesn't live up to the real expectations of computer sim freaks."

The game was the best-selling military simulation in the United States for the first half of 1997 according to PC Data. The game sold 71,000 units in 1997. The game sold more than 350,000 units worldwide by April 1997.

== Reviews ==
- PC Gamer (1996 December)
- GameSpot - Oct 17, 1996
- PC Player (Germany) - Nov, 1996
