= Dungeon Warfare 2 =

- Developer: Valsar
- Publisher: Valsar
- Platforms: Windows, Android, iOS
- Release: Windows: July 6, 2018; Android: April 2, 2019; iOS: April 3, 2019
- Genre: Tower defense
- Mode: Single-player

Dungeon Warfare 2 is a tower defense video game developed and published by Valsar. It is the sequel to Dungeon Warfare. The game was released for Windows in 2018, followed by Android and iOS versions in 2019.

== Gameplay ==
Dungeon Warfare 2 is a tower defense game in which the player takes the role of a dungeon lord and defends dungeon stages using traps and other hazards against waves of enemies. The game includes a variety of traps, equipment, and upgrade systems.

== Release ==
Dungeon Warfare 2 was released for Windows via Steam on July 6, 2018. Mobile versions were later released for Android on April 2, 2019, and for iOS on April 3, 2019.

== Reception ==
The mobile version of Dungeon Warfare 2 was reviewed by TouchArcade, which described it as a strong follow-up to the first game. Review aggregation website Metacritic assigned the game a score in the "generally favorable" range.
