= Delta Force: Black Hawk Down – Team Sabre =

Delta Force: Black Hawk Down: Team Sabre
- Developers: Ritual Entertainment; Rebellion Developments (PlayStation 2)
- Publishers: NovaLogic; Vivendi Games Mobile (Mobile)
- Series: Delta Force
- Platforms: Microsoft Windows, mobile phone, PlayStation 2
- Release: Microsoft Windows: NA: January 20, 2004; PAL: February 13, 2004; JP: February 27, 2004; Mobile: NA: Fall 2006; EU: September 30, 2006; PlayStation 2: EU: November 10, 2006; AU: November 16, 2006; NA: November 21, 2006
- Genre: First-person shooter
- Modes: Single-player, multiplayer

Delta Force: Black Hawk Down – Team Sabre is the expansion pack to Delta Force: Black Hawk Down. Team Sabre adds more weapons, that can be used in servers that only have Delta Force: Black Hawk Down. The Team Sabre expansion gives the player a new character to choose, the British elite commando unit SAS. Team Sabre adds a few more terrains which are mostly jungle and desert terrains. The expansion pack also gives the player two more campaigns which are in fictional based areas, fighting the renegade general Haatim Jaareah Kalb in the deserts of Iran and the elusive drug lord Antonio Paulo in the jungles of Colombia. The main difference from the original is the difficulty, with fewer saves and longer levels.

Novalogic announced in October 2006 that a PlayStation 2 version of Delta Force: Black Hawk Down: Team Sabre was being released in late November 2006. The video game, developed by Rebellion Developments, is a completely redeveloped version of Team Sabre featuring additional weapons and vehicles not seen in the original PlayStation 2 version of Delta Force: Black Hawk Down. At the same time, a Mobile phone version of the game was released in fall 2006.

== Plot ==
=== Colombian Campaign ===
Following a Coast Guard discovery of a large shipment of drugs and guns headed for the United States, intel has revealed that a powerful drug lord, Antonio Paulo, is trying to increase his power in parts of Colombia. This drug lord controls entire regions in remote parts of the country and employs many well-armed guerrillas to fight for him in exchange for money and weapons to aid their anti-government cause. He is known for his heavy-handed actions, including the torture of captured Colombian and American soldiers.

=== Iranian Campaign ===
Iran's fundamentalist government has given way to a less hardline administration, friendly to the West. A significant portion of the old guard, appalled with the new government's embracing of economic relationships with the "corrupt, morally evil" western powers, has taken up arms in a second revolution against the state. While government forces aided by NATO troops have managed to keep control of Tehran, fundamentalist rebels have seized control of the oil terminal on Kharg Island and production facilities to the north and Bandar Shahpur. Oil represents three-quarters of Iran's economy and a serious risk to the interests of western investors. NATO and the UN have both agreed that military intervention, led by the United States, is warranted. Delta Force has been tasked with being the spearhead of the coalition forces.

== Reception ==
Reception

Aggregate score
Aggregator	Score		
Aggregator	mobile	PC	PS2
Metacritic	N/A	70/100	48/100

Review scores
Publication	Score		
Publication	mobile	PC	PS2
Game Informer	N/A	8/10	N/A
GameSpot	N/A	7.1/10	4.5/10
GameSpy	N/A	2/5	N/A
GameZone	N/A	N/A	5/10
IGN	7.5/10	7.4/10	N/A
PlayStation Official Magazine – UK	N/A	N/A	2/10
PC Gamer (US)	N/A	59%	N/A
PlayStation: The Official Magazine	N/A	N/A	5.5/10
PSM3	N/A	N/A	58%
The Times	N/A	4/5	N/A

The PC version received "average" reviews, while the PlayStation 2 version received "unfavorable" reviews according to video game review aggregator Metacritic.
