= Chromatic Games =

American video game developer

- Formerly: Trendy Entertainment LLC (2009–2012); Trendy Entertainment Inc. (2012-2019)
- Type: Private
- Industry: Video games
- Founded: December 14, 2009; 16 years ago
- Founders: Augi Lye; Jeremy Stieglitz
- Headquarters: Gainesville, Florida, U.S.
- Key people: Augi Lye (CEO)
- Number of employees: 30 (2019)
- Website: chromatic.games

Chromatic Games, formerly Trendy Entertainment Inc., is an American video game development studio, founded in 2009, by Augi Lye and Jeremy Stieglitz. It is located in Gainesville, Florida. Trendy Entertainment is a developer of Xbox 360, PlayStation 3, Windows, iOS, and Android platform games.

== History ==
=== Establishment (2009 - 2012) ===
Trendy Entertainment developed the indie title Dungeon Defence in 4 weeks using the Unreal Engine, which was released on February 4, 2010. The game formed the basis for Dungeon Defenders, released on October 19, 2011.

Dungeon Defenders was financially successful, having sold more than 600,000 copies within two years of its release. This drew a large US$18.2 million investment into Trendy by Insight Venture Partners, gaining majority control of the company. Stieglitz stated in a later interview that Insight was not as much interested in the video game development side, and has affected their approach to developing games.

=== Stieglitz's departure and legal challenge (2013-2018) ===
A June 2013 investigation by Kotaku magazine found the company to be a poor employer, citing a sexist work environment that demanded excessive work hours. The company removed Stieglitz from their upcoming Dungeon Defenders 2 game shortly after publication of the report, and instead created an imprint division, NomNom Games, placing Stieglitz as its president by September 2013, and starting the development of Monster Madness Online, a massively multiplayer online game in the spirit of Dungeon Defenders; in this manner, Stieglitz remained as Chief Technology Officer for Trendy, but separated from those that accused him in Kotaku's report. Stieglitz remained at Trendy until around April 2014, where he wrote to Insight and Trendy's management that he could not trust some of the people working under him as a result of fallout from the report, and asked that either these people be removed, or find a way to have him leave the company. Trendy and Stieglitz came to an agreement to have him work for a few additional months, through August 2014, while agreeing to cut his non-compete agreement from three to one years.

Following his departure, Stieglitz quietly co-formed Studio Wildcard in September 2014, bringing in a number of Trendy developers who went on to develop Ark: Survival Evolved. Ostensibly, Studio Wildcard had stated that Stieglitz was only consulting on their studio during this period. However, Trendy and Insight argued that Stieglitz was breaking his non-compete after discovering his role in co-founding Wildcard, and further, had been trying to lure talent from Trendy, and had used some of the proprietary information from Trendy's work into Ark. Trendy and Insight sought US$600 million from Stieglitz in the suit, but by April 2016, Stieglitz opted to settle out of court, agreeing to pay Trendy US$40 million rather than fight the lawsuit, given Insight's financial backing.

=== Rebranding as Chromatic Games (2019 - current) ===
The company rebranded itself as Chromatic Games in March 2019. This change was followed by a buyout of the studio from its investors by the original co-founder Augi Lye, as well a transition of staff, with some veteran developers departing while new hires were brought in, bringing the total company size to 30. Under the new structure, Lye became CEO, Joshua Javaheri, Trendy’s employee zero, became the Studio Director. Colin Fisher, a developer for Dungeon Defenders II, became the studio's creative lead before departing in July 2019. Further the name change was partially divest itself from the situation around Stieglitz in 2013, as well as to show the company's refocus on ongoing development for Dungeon Defenders II and working towards a new title Dungeon Defenders: Awakened.

In October 2022, Polygon reported on further workplace mismanagement issues as a result of Lye taking over the company. Although the studio culture had improved in the years since Stieglitz's departure, it worsened again when Lye asserted a larger role in day-to-day management. Complaints centered on the newly implemented "flat" organization that harmed productivity, especially during the COVID-19 pandemic, the insufficient profit sharing model for employee pay, and extended amount of "crunch time" near product launches. Lye's personal behavior was also characterized as unprofessional, including inappropriate behavior at company parties, and his repeatedly offering to rent his personal properties out to employees so they could be local to the Gainesville office and not need to work from home. As a result of these factors, employee turnover has been high, with nearly 1/3 of the studio leaving or getting fired over the course of a few months.
