= Comanche 4 =

2001 video game

- Developer: NovaLogic
- Publisher: NovaLogic
- Series: Comanche
- Platform: Windows
- Release: NA: November 2001; EU: December 2001
- Genre: Combat flight simulation
- Modes: Single-player, multiplayer

Comanche 4 is a combat flight simulation video game developed and published by NovaLogic for Windows in 2001. It is the fourth main title of the Comanche series.

== Gameplay ==
In Comanche 4 the player pilots the Comanche RAH-66. The game offers 6 single player campaigns with 30 missions total in which the player takes part in various military conflict around the globe. Multiplayer supports up to 16 players on LAN and through the Internet. The game also features a mission editor allowing players to create their own environment and objectives.

== Development ==
There was a strong focus on game visuals during development. Earlier Comanche titles used voxel technology but developers switched to a polygon based engine for graphics improvement. Georgina Petrie from NovaLogic explained: "The evolution of graphics cards has allowed us to do some amazing effects. Dust flying up, trees swaying, water spraying, it's all there. There isn't another game out there that has this level of rotor wash effects." IGN staff also pointed out the shadow effects adding to the level of detail.

The development team intended to make the title "as fun to play as it is to look at". The game focuses more on action than previous titles, with varied missions from dense jungles to urban areas. Trees, buildings, the ground and most of the environment was designed to be destructible to add to the experience. The gameplay moved away from complex simulation towards simpler mechanics to appeal to "action gamers, because it's got a five-minute learning curve."

== Reception ==
Comanche 4

Aggregate scores
Aggregator	Score
GameRankings	79%
Metacritic	74/100

Review scores
Publication	Score
Computer Gaming World	3.5/5
Game Informer	6.5/10
GameSpot	7.7/10
GameSpy	79/100
IGN	8.6/10

Comanche 4 was well received by critics and users holding a score of 74/100 on Metacritic.

Computer Gaming World's Jeff Lackey summarized the game as: "A standard but well-done shoot-'em-up action/arcade game."

GameSpot's Bruce Grey praised the game's visuals and special effects made available by the move to a more modern graphical engine. He enjoyed the simple and non-stop action calling it a "flying version of Serious Sam" but which also made the game feel repetitive in gameplay, recommending it in "small doses". In summary, he said excellent graphics and action makes it a "great game to fire up [...] as a change of pace".

GameSpy's Alan Lackey also welcomed the move to modern graphics highlighting the environmental details and spectacular destruction. Simpler controls and minimal preparation made the game more accessible to action gamers. He also pointed out the variety and originality of the missions. He described the game as a successful blend of fast-paced action and technical flight sims with "amazing graphics" and "entertaining mission design".

IGN's Ivan Sulic approved the change of graphics engine praising the "technically brilliant, realistic, yet polished aesthetic": "vast, realistic landscapes dotted with flora and architecture" and "satisfying" explosions. He also noted the high hardware requirements and performance cost needed to run the game on best graphics quality. Simpler controls moved the title away from simulation, and makes it a mix of realism and efficient design choices to allow "smooth" gameplay, that sometimes affect playability. The variety of missions lowers cohesion and without a "greater underlying story" does not convey a "feeling of importance" but an "objective based abruptness". Despite these inconveniences, the visual appeal, simple controls and combat make it an enjoyable action game.

== See also ==
- Enemy Engaged: RAH-66 Comanche vs. KA-52 Hokum
