= Perry Municipal Airport (Oklahoma) =

Airport in Noble County

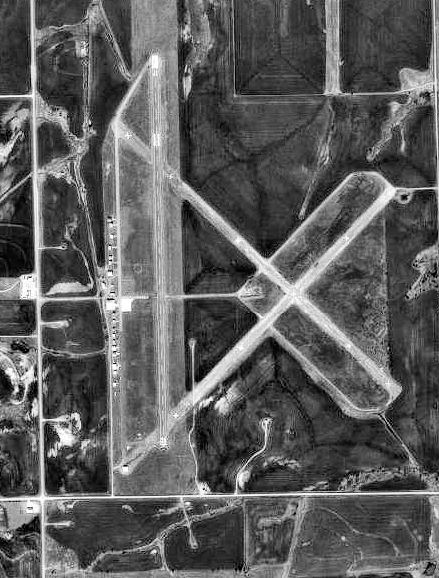
- USGS aerial image, 1995
- IATA: none; ICAO: none; FAA LID: F22

Summary
- Airport type: Public
- Owner: City of Perry
- Serves: Perry, Oklahoma
- Elevation AMSL: 1,002 ft / 305 m
- Coordinates: 36°23′08″N 97°16′38″W
- Interactive map of Perry Municipal Airport

Runways
Direction	Length		Surface
Direction	ft	m	Surface
17/35	5,110	1,558	Asphalt

Statistics (2009)
- Aircraft operations: 30,000
- Based aircraft: 21
- Source: Federal Aviation Administration

Perry Municipal Airport (FAA LID: F22) is a city-owned public-use airport located five nautical miles (9 km) north of the central business district of Perry, a city in Noble County, Oklahoma, United States. This airport is included in the FAA's National Plan of Integrated Airport Systems for 2009–2013, which categorized it as a general aviation facility.

== History ==
Established as Noble Army Airfield and activated on 11 February 1942. Assigned to the USAAF Gulf Coast Training Center (later Central Flying Training Command) as a basic (level 1) pilot training airfield. Operated by the Enid Flying School as an auxiliary to Enid Army Airfield.

Flying training was performed with Fairchild PT-19s as the primary trainer. Also had several PT-17 Stearmans and a few P-40 Warhawks assigned. Inactivated 28 October with the drawdown of AAFTC's pilot training program and was declared surplus and turned over to the Army Corps of Engineers. Eventually discharged to the War Assets Administration (WAA) and deeded to the City of Perry as a commercial airport.

== Facilities and aircraft ==
Perry Municipal Airport covers an area of 800 acres (320 ha) at an elevation of 1,002 feet (305 m) above mean sea level. It has one runway designated 17/35 with an asphalt surface measuring 5,110 by 75 feet (1,558 x 23 m).

For the 12-month period ending November 4, 2009, the airport had 30,000 aircraft operations, an average of 82 per day: 60% military and 40% general aviation. At that time there were 21 aircraft based at this airport: 76% single-engine, 10% multi-engine, 5% helicopter and 10% ultralight.

== See also ==
- Oklahoma World War II Army Airfields
