= F-22 Lightning 3 =

1999 video game

- Developer(s): Novalogic
- Publisher(s): Novalogic
- Producer(s): Wes Eckhart
- Designer(s): Mat Jennings
- Programmer(s): Patrick Griffith
- Artist(s): Keith Rust
- Composer(s): Alan Koshiyama
- Platform(s): Windows
- Release: NA: May 20, 1999; UK: July 30, 1999
- Genre(s): Air combat simulation
- Mode(s): Single-player, multiplayer

F-22 Lightning 3 is a combat flight simulation game developed and published by Novalogic in 1999. It is a follow-up to F-22 Raptor (1997) and the third and final game in Novalogic's F-22 series.

== Development ==
The game was announced in March 1999.

== Reception ==
Reception

Aggregate score
Aggregator	Score
GameRankings	73%

Review scores
Publication	Score
AllGame	4/5 stars
CNET Gamecenter	5/10
Computer Games Strategy Plus	4/5 stars
Computer Gaming World	3.5/5 stars
GamePro	(Note: GamePro gave the game 2.5/5 for graphics, two 2/5 scores for sound and overall fun factor, and 4/5 for control.)
GameSpot	8.2/10
GameZone	7.35/10
IGN	8.4/10
PC Gamer (US)	72%
PC Zone	70%

The game received above-average reviews according to the review aggregation website GameRankings.
