= Delta Force: Land Warrior =

2000 video game

- Developer: NovaLogic
- Publisher: NovaLogic
- Producer: Wes Eckhart
- Designer: Michael S. Maza
- Programmer: Patrick Griffith
- Artists: Keith Rust; Rod Parong; Jason Tull
- Composers: Tom Hays; Scott M. Gilman; Alan Koshiyama
- Series: Delta Force
- Platform: Windows
- Release: NA: November 8, 2000; EU: February 2, 2001
- Genre: Tactical first-person shooter
- Modes: Single player, multiplayer

Delta Force: Land Warrior is a 2000 tactical first-person shooter video game. Developed and published by NovaLogic, it is the third game in the Delta Force series and the sequel to Delta Force 2. A standalone expansion pack, Delta Force: Task Force Dagger, was released in 2002.

== Gameplay ==
Unlike previous games in the series, Land Warrior supports 3D acceleration.

Delta Force: Land Warrior features 30 missions, 10 of which are quick missions, and one being a tutorial mission. Unlike the previous entries in the Delta Force series, there is no mission select screen in the campaign menu. The game takes place across various locations including Africa, Indonesia, and South America. Objectives range from eliminating high-risk threats at important structures such as power plants, to rescuing VIPs held hostage. Before deployment, players get briefed and are tasked with picking the specific equipment and gear they want for the mission, allowing them to define their strategy beforehand, e.g.: a stealthy approach with silenced weaponry, or an all-out assault with heavy weaponry.

The player is inserted into the objective area by means of either insertion by helicopter or parachute. Once on the ground, players can navigate the terrain through the use of a mini-map, containing waypoints directing the player to their objective(s). In certain missions, the player leads a fireteam, allowing him to issue orders to his teammates, although the majority of missions pits the player alone against the enemy. A map editor is included, allowing players to modify existing maps, or create new ones.

=== Multiplayer ===
Multiplayer allows up to 50 players to compete in the game modes Deathmatch, Team Deathmatch, King Of The Hill, Capture the Flag, Flagball, in which up to 4 teams compete in order to capture one flag located in the middle of the battlefield, and Coop mode, which allows four players to work together to complete the standard singleplayer missions.

== Synopsis ==
The game starts with the hostage rescue in one of the Great Pyramids of Giza. It is later discovered that the terrorists involved belong to the Armed People's Front (APF), a group that is opposed to Western involvement in the Middle East and is planning attacks on Western factions in Egypt. The Delta team seizes weapons caches at a dig site in Western Egypt and is led to the capture of APF's leader, Meinhard Kreider, in a raid on his fortress.

After Kreider's arrest, the terrorist front New Dawn is revealed by Nikogos Fazekas, who is intent on getting Kreider released from a NATO prison. New Dawn and the remnants of APF forces lead an attack on a Mediterranean oilrig but are stopped by the Delta team. A New Dawn launches several attacks on the West, from taking hostages in Mayan ruins to hiding weapons and drugs in Lebanon and Indonesia. A Spetsnaz officer taken hostage in Lebanon is rescued in a heavily defended compound by the Delta Team. The fireteam then destroys drug shipments in Indonesia. A New Dawn training facility is neutralized during an ambush in the Banda Sea. Later, the head of the World Bank is rescued in a Japanese saiguden. Finally, the team comes together to rescue the American ambassador to Mexico in the Palenque ruins and stops the delivery of a radiological bomb from the Yucatan to Los Angeles. However, another radiological bomb escaped to an abandoned detention center near Ciudad Juarez but was seized in time by Delta Force members Snakebite and Pitbull.

Kreider is finally released by NATO forces in a ploy to corner Fazekas. Kreider is recaptured on his way to Colombia and Fazekas is tracked to Easter Island, where he is killed in an underground labyrinth of tunnels. The APF and New Dawn are broken up after Fazekas' death and Kreider's recapture.

== Engine ==
Delta Force: Land Warrior finally used a polygon based rasterizer with hardware acceleration for all its visuals. While the terrain was still present as a heightmap it was now rendered with polygons. Draw distances remain on the same level as in the earlier engines and maps are looped in all directions so there are no visible map borders. The new engine also allows for tunnel complexes, featured prominently in the campaign and showcased in the first mission which mostly takes place in Egyptian ruins.

== Development ==
The game was announced at E3 2000 and was originally scheduled to release in Fall 2000.

== Reception ==
Reception

Aggregate score
Aggregator	Score
Metacritic	74/100

Review scores
Publication	Score
AllGame	3/5
Computer Gaming World	2/5
Edge	6/10
GameFan	83%
GamePro	4/5
GameRevolution	C+
GameSpot	7.3/10
GameSpy	83%
IGN	7.3/10
PC Gamer (US)	78%

In the United States, Land Warrior sold 280,000 copies and earned $7.6 million by August 2006, after its release in November 2000. It was the country's 71st best-selling computer game between January 2000 and August 2006. Combined sales of all Delta Force computer games released between January 2000 and August 2006 had reached 1.7 million units in the United States by the latter date. The game received "average" reviews according to video game review aggregator platform Metacritic.
