= Comanche: Maximum Overkill =

1992 video game developed and published by NovaLogic for DOS

- Developer: NovaLogic
- Publisher: NovaLogic
- Series: Comanche
- Platforms: MS-DOS, Mac OS
- Release: 1992: MS-DOS; 1995: Mac
- Genre: Combat flight simulation
- Mode: Single-player

Comanche: Maximum Overkill is a video game developed and published by NovaLogic for MS-DOS in 1992. Two expansion packs were released: Mission Disk 1 and Over the Edge. A compilation titled Comanche CD was released in 1994. It included the main game and the two expansions. A Mac OS port of the compilation was released in 1995 as Comanche Mac.

A port of the game was in development for the Super NES using the Super FX chip, and was exhibited at E3 1995, but was cancelled. A Nintendo spokesperson said that the project was aborted because of unresolvable difficulties with the game's graphics and speed.

== Gameplay ==
In-game screenshot

Comanche: Maximum Overkill is a game in which the player can pilot the Comanche RAH-66.

== Reception ==
Reception

Review scores
Publication	Score
PC Games (DE)	92%
PC Player (DE)	86/100

Computer Gaming World's Bryan Walker said: "Some flight-sim veterans might sneer at CMO's limited scope and casual approach to technical detail. These same gamers may also be the ones most impressed with the new technology CMO delivers. While the sedate flight characteristics and simple controls are more suited to beginning players, nearly everyone will find something in CMO to enjoy. Hopefully, NovaLogic will work to fix the flaws and fulfill the awesome potential of this game. Even as it stands, cutting-edge graphics firepower gives Comanche Maximum Overkill the edge it needs to sweep more than a couple of competitors off the battlefield."
