= Comanche 3 =

1997 video game

- Developer: NovaLogic
- Publisher: NovaLogic
- Series: Comanche
- Engine: Voxel Space 2
- Platforms: MS-DOS, Windows (Gold)
- Release: WW: May 1, 1997
- Genre: Combat flight simulator
- Modes: Single player, multiplayer

Comanche 3 is a video game developed and published by NovaLogic for MS-DOS on May 1, 1997.

== Gameplay ==
Comanche 3 is a military helicopter flight simulator that features a number of missions on a variety of terrains.

== Comanche 3 Gold ==
A year after initial release on April 22, 1998 Comanche 3 Gold was released. This re-packaging of the game made numerous improvements. The game was now native to Windows 95/98 and optimized for MMX. The number of missions was more than doubled. The original four campaigns with 8 missions each were classified as 'Silver Missions' in the main menu, while the five new campaigns with 8 missions each were placed under the 'Gold Missions' section of the menu. Additionally a bonus campaign consisting of 6 missions was created by a former U.S. Army Liaison to Boeing Sikorsky, Major Allen Sakcriska and were included under 'Special Operations' option in the menu. Overall Comanche 3 Gold features 78 missions in addition to the training missions). Weather effects were added such as rain and snow. A mission editor was added and players can now choose their helicopter's loadout before each mission. Comanche's wingman AI was improved and the player can now give orders to the wingman. New vehicles and structures were added, AC-130U Spectre Gunship, M167 20mm Vulcan AAA, HAMC (Eurocopter) Z-9A (China), electric power generators, different bridge structures, Mongolian rail yard among others. NovaLogic matchmaking over the internet was introduced.

== Development ==
Comanche 3 debuted the Voxel Space 2 engine.

== Reception ==
Next Generation reviewed the PC version of the game, rating it three stars out of five, and stated that "overall Comanche 3 is a great-looking game that emphasizes fun and entertainment at the cost of some realism. The result is a title that gamers will love, although hardcore flight-sim freaks may have some things to grumble about."

Comanche 3 was the best-selling helicopter title of 1997, as well as the top-selling combat simulation of the year. In the United States, it sold 62,650 copies and earned $3.01 million in 1997.
