= F-22 Raptor (video game) =

1997 video game

- Developer: Novalogic
- Publisher: Novalogic
- Engine: Demon-1
- Platform: Microsoft Windows
- Release: NA: November 20, 1997; EU: 1997
- Genre: Air combat simulation
- Modes: Single player, multiplayer

F-22 Raptor is a combat flight simulation video game released by Novalogic in 1997. It is a follow-up to F-22 Lightning II. A third game in the series, F-22 Lightning 3, was released in 1999.

== Gameplay ==
The game involves modern air combat in several campaigns and missions. The campaigns are set around fictional wars in areas such as Angola, Jordan, Russia, Colombia, and Iran, with the player fighting for the United States. There is also a tutorial mode. The multiplayer supports null modem, IPX and internet play.

== Reception ==
Reception

Aggregate score
Aggregator	Score
GameRankings	77%

Review scores
Publication	Score
CNET Gamecenter	4/10
Computer Games Strategy Plus	3.5/5
Computer Gaming World	4/5
Edge	8/10
GameRevolution	A−
GameSpot	6.1/10
GameStar	(1997) 84% (1998) 81%
PC Zone	79%

The game received favorable reviews according to the review aggregation website GameRankings.
