= Delta Force: Black Hawk Down =

2003 video game

- Developers: NovaLogic; Climax London (Xbox); Rebellion Developments (PS2); Aspyr (Mac OS X)
- Publishers: NovaLogic; Aspyr (Mac OS X)
- Director: John A. Garcia
- Producer: Wes Eckhart
- Programmers: Mark Davis; Kyle Freeman; Eric Milota; Kent Simon
- Artist: Chris Tamburrino
- Composers: Russell Brower; Ron Fish
- Series: Delta Force
- Engine: Black Hawk Engine; Asura (PlayStation 2)
- Platforms: Microsoft Windows; PlayStation 2 Mac OS X Xbox
- Release: Windows: NA: March 25, 2003; EU: March 28, 2003; Mac OS X: NA: July 5, 2004; PlayStation 2 & Xbox: NA: July 26, 2005; EU: September 2, 2005
- Genre: First-person shooter
- Modes: Single-player, multiplayer

Delta Force: Black Hawk Down is a first-person shooter video game developed by NovaLogic. It was released for Microsoft Windows on March 25, 2003; for Mac OS X in July 2004; and for PlayStation 2 and Xbox on July 26, 2005. It is the 6th game of the Delta Force series. It is set in the early 1990s, during the Unified Task Force peacekeeping operation in Somalia. The missions take place primarily in the southern Jubba Valley and the capital Mogadishu. The game also features a mission editor with which players can make custom missions. The game is based on the book of the same name, not the Sony film.

== Plot ==
The player begins the game as a soldier with Task Force Ranger, commanding three team members: Huck, Mother, and Preacher. They take part in the Unified Task Force peacekeeping operation during the Somali Civil War. Following the third mission, the player assumes the role of the same soldier. They are assigned to 1st Special Forces Operational Detachment-Delta, taking part in Operation Gothic Serpent, a military operation conducted during the Battle of Mogadishu on October 3, 1993. During the latter section of the game, the player will still play as that soldier, but is now sent to the 3rd Ranger Battalion and the 1st Special Forces Operational Detachment-Delta, commonly known as Delta Force. The final mission features an alternate history, in which the player and a team of operators carry out the assassination of Mohamed Farrah Aidid.

== Gameplay ==
The gameplay in Delta Force: Black Hawk Down differs heavily from earlier installments in the series. While all earlier Delta Force games focus on long distance outdoor combat and have open ended mission design, Black Hawk Down focuses on close quarters combat in urban environments with heavily scripted missions more similar to the then-recent Medal of Honor: Allied Assault. Many of the series' trademark features, such as bullet ballistics and later weapon sway, were abandoned in favour of simpler action-focused gameplay. The player is usually accompanied by a squad of three AI-controlled soldiers, whom the player is able to give simple commands such as the order to hold fire, hold position or throw a grenade.

Wielding an M16 rifle

Like in earlier Delta Force games, the campaign in Black Hawk Down is divided into distinct missions. While the campaign is linear, most of the time three missions are available at the same time, allowing the player to complete them in any order. Completing a mission saves the campaign progress and usually unlocks a new one. Already completed missions can be accessed from an "instant action" list.

=== Multiplayer ===
In addition to the singleplayer campaign, Delta Force: Black Hawk Down features LAN and online multiplayer with support for up to 50 players in a single match, breaking the record for the largest console multiplayer battles at the time. While Xbox Live support for games on the original Xbox ended in 2010, Delta Force: Black Hawk Down is now playable online with Insignia, a revival server restoring online functionality to original Xbox games

The online multiplayer is powered by NovaWorld, which tracks players' statistics, gives them increasing ranks, and has a matchmaking system. Various gameplay modes are available, including Deathmatch, Team Deathmatch, and King of the Hill, as well as objective-based ones. Like in the previous two Delta Force games, players can choose one out of several character classes with individual characteristics.

== Development ==
Delta Force: Black Hawk Down uses an engine based on Comanche 4, which allows for more detail and advanced visual effects, thanks to shader support. Also, vehicle movement is not restricted to specific, predefined paths anymore, and the AI drivers are able to avoid obstacles. It is the first engine used by the series to support platforms other than PC.

=== Expansion pack ===
In 2004, an expansion pack, Team Sabre, was released for the PC and PlayStation 2 versions of the game, adding two campaigns which take place in Colombia and Iran, respectively.

== Reception ==
Reception

Aggregate score
Aggregator	Score		
Aggregator	PC	PS2	Xbox
Metacritic	77/100	58/100	61/100

Review scores
Publication	Score		
Publication	PC	PS2	Xbox
Edge	7/10	4/10	N/A
Eurogamer	7/10	N/A	N/A
Game Informer	N/A	6.75/10	6.75/10
GamePro	4.5/5	N/A	N/A
GameRevolution	N/A	D+	D+
GameSpot	5.6/10	5.7/10	5.7/10
GameSpy	4/5	2.5/5	2.5/5
GameTrailers	N/A	N/A	7.2/10
GameZone	N/A	6/10	6.9/10
IGN	8.9/10	5.5/10	6.8/10
Official Xbox Magazine (US)	N/A	N/A	6.2/10
PC Gamer (US)	79%	N/A	N/A
PlayStation: The Official Magazine	N/A	5.5/10	N/A
The Cincinnati Enquirer	3.5/5	N/A	N/A
Detroit Free Press	N/A	N/A	2/4

Black Hawk Down's computer version received a "Silver" sales award from the Entertainment and Leisure Software Publishers Association (ELSPA), indicating sales of at least 100,000 copies in the United Kingdom.

The PC version received "generally favorable reviews", while the Xbox and PlayStation 2 versions received "mixed" reviews according to video game review aggregator Metacritic.

Maxim gave the game a score of eight out of ten, first saying of the PC version, "While it would be impossible for the game to mimic the raw emotion and chaos that defined this mission-turned-disaster in real life, the graphics are the best we’ve seen on a battlefield"; and then of the PS2 and Xbox versions, "Drink in your fill of military realism in crowded, confusing war zones where you can drown in rivers, kill civilians, and partake in friendly fire–just like we did–before heading to boot camp to apologize. If that's not enough carnage, you can also engage in 32-player (50 on Xbox Live) online deathmatch missions, which is technically twice the bloody chaos of Halo 2. See, foreign policy can be fun!"

The Cincinnati Enquirer gave the PC version a score of three-and-a-half stars out of five and stated, "If you can forgive the game's lighter approach–one that emphasizes action instead of strategy–then you'll enjoy Black Hawk Down."

However, Detroit Free Press gave the Xbox version two stars out of four, quipping, "Diehard military combat fans might want to rent this one just to partake in the giant chaotic skirmishes."

The Sydney Morning Herald gave both the PS2 and Xbox versions two-and-a-half stars out of five, stating, "The solo campaign lacks the pizzazz of other military shooters, but decent multiplayer options prevent it from feeling pilotless."
