= Delta Force (series) =

- Genres: First-person shooter; Tactical shooter
- Developers: NovaLogic; Zombie Inc.; Rebellion Developments; Ritual Entertainment; TiMi Studio Group; Team Jade
- Publisher: NovaLogic 2009 (formerly) / TiMi Studio Group 2025 (currently)
- First release: Delta Force; 1998
- Latest release: Delta Force; 2025

Delta Force is a series of first-person shooter video games by NovaLogic created in 1998. They are often included in the sub-genre labeled "tactical shooters". NovaLogic was the primary developer and license holder of the franchise until the acquisition of its assets by THQ Nordic on October 31, 2016. Starting with Delta Force: Xtreme 2, the series has gone under a dormant state for 16 years, until a reboot; Delta Force released in 2025. Early installments received critical praise and commercial success, helping popularize the tactical shooter genre alongside contemporary series like Tom Clancy's Rainbow Six. The franchise was particularly noted for pioneering large-scale outdoor combat and introducing long-range tactical realism to the genre.

== Games ==
Title	Year	Platform(s)			Developer	Publisher
Delta Force	1998	Windows			NovaLogic	NovaLogic
Delta Force 2	1999	Windows			NovaLogic	NovaLogic
Delta Force: Land Warrior	2000	Windows			NovaLogic	NovaLogic
Delta Force: Task Force Dagger	2002	Windows			Zombie Inc.	NovaLogic
Delta Force: Urban Warfare	2002	PlayStation			Rebellion Developments	NovaLogic
Delta Force: Black Hawk Down	2003	Windows	PlayStation 2	Mac OS X; XBox	NovaLogic; Climax Group (XBox); Rebellion Developments (PS2)	NovaLogic; Aspyr (Mac OS X)
Delta Force: Black Hawk Down – Team Sabre	2004	Windows	PlayStation 2	Mobile phone	Ritual Entertainment; Rebellion Developments (PS2)	NovaLogic; Vivendi Universal Games (Mobile)
Delta Force: Xtreme	2005	Windows			NovaLogic	NovaLogic
Delta Force: Xtreme 2	2009	Windows			NovaLogic	NovaLogic
Delta Force Angel Falls	N/A	N/A			NovaLogic	NovaLogic
Delta Force	2024	Windows (Steam, Epic Games Store); PlayStation 5; Xbox Series S and Series X; iOS; Android			Team Jade	TiMi Studio Group

Release timeline
1998	Delta Force
1999	Delta Force 2
2000	Delta Force: Land Warrior
2001
2002	Delta Force: Task Force Dagger
2002	Delta Force: Urban Warfare
2003	Delta Force: Black Hawk Down
2004	Delta Force: Black Hawk Down - Team Sabre
2005	Delta Force: Xtreme
2006
2007
2008
2009	Delta Force: Xtreme 2
2010
2011
2012
2013
2014
2015
2016
2017
2018
2019
2020
2021
2022
2023
2024
2025	Delta Force

- Delta Force was the first game in the series, featuring multiple campaigns including catching a drug lord in Peru and campaigns against rebels in Chad, Uzbekistan, Indonesia and the Russian island of Novaya Zemlya.
- Delta Force 2 was a sequel involving a campaign against fictional international bioterrorist organization Da'nil's and fictional nuclear terrorist organization United Freedom. This also marked the first game in the series to feature a mission editor to make player-created missions.
- Delta Force: Land Warrior is the third game in the series, with a campaign involving fictional terrorist organization New Dawn. This was also the first game in the series to feature named characters with backgrounds: Sniper "Daniel 'Longbow' Lonetree", Machine Gunner "Rydel 'Pitbull' Wilson", Demolitions Expert "Cole 'Gas Can' Harris", female CQB expert "Jen 'Snake Bite' Tanaka" and female underwater combatant/medic "Erica 'Mako' Swift".
- Delta Force: Task Force Dagger was a standalone expansion pack for Land Warrior and took place during the War in Afghanistan, including a final mission based on the Battle of Tora Bora.
- Delta Force: Urban Warfare was the fifth title in the series and its only PlayStation exclusive. This would also be the first and only game in the series to feature cutscene cinematics, telling the story of a Delta Force operative named John Carter who had taken part in a failed drug deal bust in Tumaco, Colombia and was subsequently sent undercover by CIA agent Robert Jackson to capture or kill the involved drug lord and red mercury smuggler Malik. The drug lord in last part of the story tries to escape by a plane and is shot down by John using a MANPAD.
- Delta Force: Black Hawk Down was the sixth title in the series, and was heavily inspired by Ridley Scott's eponymous movie, being similarly set during the Somali Civil War and the First Battle of Mogadishu. It added new features like being able to operate .50 cal Brownings, miniguns and recoilless rifles from Humvees, UH-60 Blackhawks and various technicals.
- Delta Force: Black Hawk Down - Team Sabre was an expansion pack for Black Hawk Down that added two additional campaigns; one involving fictional Colombian drug lord Antonio Paulo and one a fictional Iranian coup by General Haatim Jaareeh Bin Shamim Kalb. The expansion also included more vehicles with mounted weapons - Véhicule Blindé Légers, MH-53 Pavelows, Rigid-hull inflatable boats and patrol boats.
- Delta Force: Xtreme was the eighth title and a remake of the first game. It was also the first in the series to give the player the ability to drive vehicles, motorcycles, tanks, APCs, boats and pilot helicopters. It features the Peru, Chad and Novaya Zemlya campaigns from the first game.
- Delta Force: Xtreme 2 was the ninth title in the series; despite its name, it is not a remake of a previous game in the series, but an original game. It featured two intertwined campaigns involving a Central Asian arms smuggler Alian Khalid who has armed and is using a South-East Asian drug cartel by providing them military-grade weapons in exchange to following his orders and has aims to remove Western influence in the Middle-East. Missions involve attacking and destroying both groups.
- Delta Force Angel Falls was going to be the tenth title in the series, taking place in South America. It was never released and is now considered vaporware due to NovaLogic's closure in 2016.
- Delta Force was announced in August 2023, and released in January 2025. It is a free-to-play, cross-platform title, which has released across PC, consoles, and smartphones. The multiplayer modes feature both competitive, large-scale, class-based combat (including the use of land-, sea-, and air-based vehicles) and cooperative play against AI-controlled opponents, while the single-player campaign is a remake of the campaign from Black Hawk Down.
