= Delta Force: Xtreme 2 =

2009 video game

- Developer(s): NovaLogic
- Publisher(s): NovaLogic (Note: Retail version published in Europe by CDV Software)
- Series: Delta Force
- Platform(s): Windows
- Release: NA: May 26, 2009; WW: June 18, 2009
- Genre(s): First-person shooter, action
- Mode(s): Single-player, multiplayer

Delta Force: Xtreme 2 (DFX2) is a 2009 first-person shooter video game by NovaLogic released for Microsoft Windows. It is the sequel to Delta Force: Xtreme, which was released in 2005.

== Gameplay ==
DFX2 has added multiplayer features, such as in-game squad emblems on characters and vehicles, and the ability to respawn in teammates' vehicles. The game comes with a MED mission editor and a number of terrains and assets for players to create their own battleground and host them online.

== Development and release ==
A free beta was available to the public before the full release of the game. The beta was first issued to Gold Members at NovaWorld 2. Additionally, players were able to test both single player and multiplayer content.

The game was officially released on May 26, 2009 in North America, and became available worldwide through digital download through numerous sites including the NovaWorld Store; as of June 19, the game is available for download through Steam. On September 3, 2009, the game was made available through select European territories via CDV Software.

== Reception ==
Reception

Aggregate score
Aggregator	Score
Metacritic	40/100

Review scores
Publication	Score
GameSpot	5/10
IGN	4.8/10
PC Zone	25%
