= NovaLogic =

American video game developer

NovaLogic, Inc.
- Type: Subsidiary
- Industry: Video games
- Founded: August 7, 1985; 41 years ago in Calabasas, California
- Founder: John A. Garcia
- Defunct: October 2016; 10 years ago
- Fate: Label and intellectual properties acquired and integrated into THQ Nordic
- Successor: THQ Nordic
- Headquarters: Malibu, California, United States
- Area served: Worldwide
- Products: Comanche series Delta Force series
- Website: novalogic.com

NovaLogic, Inc. was an American software developer and publisher established in 1985 and based in Calabasas, California. The company was founded by CEO John A. Garcia. Garcia's background in computer software started in Southern California in the early 1980s, when he worked at Datasoft. The company was known for its Voxel Space engine, which was utilized in franchises such as the Comanche and Delta Force series. In October 2016, NovaLogic's assets were bought out by THQ Nordic who are not currently using the label.

== History ==
Originally, NovaLogic worked on new versions of previously published games. Taito America was a major client of the company and most (if not all) of NovaLogic's earliest games were PC conversions of Taito arcade games. NovaLogic's 1992 game Comanche: Maximum Overkill was the first release that utilized the Voxel Space engine, which allowed for larger outdoor environments and more detailed terrain. The engine was conceived by electrical engineer Kyle Freeman. Freeman's engine stemmed from his earlier creations of medical technology. In addition, the cancelled CD-i sequel to Super Mario World, Super Mario's Wacky Worlds, was in development by NovaLogic. Due to the failure of the Phillips CD-i platform, the project was cancelled in 1993.

Comanche: Maximum Overkill kickstarted a string of releases by NovaLogic that simulated military battles. Other games included the F-22 plane simulators, Armored Fist tank simulators, and expanding the Comanche helicopter simulators. After releasing several successful military-themed games, the company started NovaLogic Systems, Inc. (NLS) on February 13, 1996. They were initially contracted by the US Army to create training simulations for the branch. In 1997, NovaLogic launched its free online matchmaking service, NovaWorld. The service allowed for large online battles and stat tracking.

In 1998, NovaLogic continued to evolve their Voxel Space engine for the inaugural game in the Delta Force series. The game was a first-person shooter set in large outdoor environments in a realistic military setting. It also featured the online NovaWorld system, which allowed for large numbers of players in a singular server. The game was well-received and it prompted the company to continue the franchise. Delta Force 2 was released in 1999, followed by Delta Force: Land Warrior in 2000. The trilogy of Delta Force titles were successful in the United Kingdom as indicated by ELSPA's chart. Delta Force peaked at #3 in February 1999, Delta Force 2 peaked at #2 in February 2000, and Delta Force: Land Warrior peaked at #1 in March 2001.

NovaLogic also ventured into space combat with Tachyon: The Fringe, featuring Bruce Campbell in the lead voice acting role. In 2001, the company released Comanche 4, the fourth and final game in the long-running series. NovaLogic, in collaboration with artist Gerald Brom, also planned to develop a PC fantasy first-person shooter entitled Necrocide: The Dead Must Die based on the Delta Force: Land Warrior engine; however, the game got cancelled in 2002.

Delta Force's first game on consoles was published in 2002, titled Delta Force: Urban Warfare for the PlayStation. It was released late in the original PlayStation's life, in July 2002. The fourth main game in the series was released in 2003 as Delta Force: Black Hawk Down. The game was a success, and it sold over 100,000 copies in the United Kingdom alone while peaking at #2 on ELSPA's chart in April 2003. It was also the best-selling game for the month of April in the United States, peaking at #1 on NPD Techworld's chart.

NovaLogic launched Joint Operations: Typhoon Rising in 2004, which was another first-person shooter similar to the Delta Force series, but the game had more focus on multiplayer. The company claimed to have set a world record for the "largest first-person shooter game", which was quickly refuted by Sony Online Entertainment for its game PlanetSide that had routinely hosted hundreds of players on a single server. Ultimately the company settled for the title of "largest modern combat first-person shooter without a subscription".

One year later, NovaLogic released Delta Force: Black Hawk Down for the PlayStation 2 and Xbox consoles, developed by Climax Group. The port allowed up to 50 players in a multiplayer game, breaking the record for the largest console multiplayer battles at the time. That same year, NovaLogic was fined $153,500 by the Business Software Alliance after an audit found it had unlicensed copies of software by Adobe, Apple, Autodesk, FileMaker, Macromedia, Microsoft, and Symantec.

NovaLogic continued its flagship franchise with the fifth main game Delta Force: Xtreme in 2005. The company had taken elements from the initial 1998 Delta Force game and recreated them in Delta Force: Xtreme, with updated graphics and gameplay. In 2008, publisher MTR Soft had displayed information about NovaLogic's then-upcoming title Delta Force: Angel Falls. In December 2008, NovaLogic announced it had cut ties with MTR Soft, due to MTR using the license to gain additional funds. Also in 2008, NovaLogic released an alpha build of NovaWorld 2.0 that featured better performance and features. In June 2009, NovaLogic released the sixth main Delta Force game, titled Delta Force: Xtreme 2. It was released simultaneously at retail and online via digital download. The game's engine and features were extremely similar to the previous game Delta Force: Xtreme. It became the final game in the franchise, as Delta Force: Angel Falls was never completed. Delta Force: Xtreme 2 also ultimately became the final game released by NovaLogic. All titles released by the company afterwards were either compilations or re-releases.

In 2012, NovaLogic attempted to sue Activision for its usage of the Delta Force name within its game Call of Duty: Modern Warfare 3, alleging that the usage would confuse consumers and would also damage NovaLogic's reputation. One year later, NovaLogic lost the case in court as the judge ruled in Activision's favor. On October 31, 2016, it was announced that the game developer and publisher THQ Nordic had acquired all of NovaLogic's assets, while buying out Electronic Arts' minority stake. The NovaLogic name remained dormant after the purchase; however, THQ Nordic revived the Comanche name for a new game in the franchise, with an early access release in 2020.

In August 2023, Tencent revealed a revival of the Delta Force series with Delta Force: Hawk Ops. It was described as a large-scale PvP first-person shooter with cross-platform support.

== Games ==
Year	Title	Platform(s)
1988	Bubble Bobble	Apple II, MS-DOS
1988	Arkanoid	MS-DOS
1989	Arkanoid: Revenge of Doh	MS-DOS
1989	Renegade	Apple II
1990	Rastan	Apple IIGS, MS-DOS
1990	Wolf Pack	Amiga, Atari ST, MS-DOS, Mac, PC-98
1991	The Chessmaster	Game Gear
1991	Crystal Quest	Game Boy
1991	The Rocketeer	MS-DOS, Super NES
1992	Captain Planet and the Planeteers	Genesis
1992	Comanche: Maximum Overkill	MS-DOS
1992	Jigsaw: The Ultimate Electronic Puzzle	CD-i
1993	Ultrabots	MS-DOS
1994	Armored Fist	MS-DOS
1994	Comanche CD	MS-DOS, Mac
1995	Werewolf vs. Comanche	MS-DOS, Mac
1995	Black Fire	Saturn
1995	Comanche 2	MS-DOS
1996	F-22 Lightning II	MS-DOS
1997	F-22 Raptor	Windows
1997	Comanche 3	MS-DOS
1997	Armored Fist 2	MS-DOS
1998	Comanche Gold	Windows
1998	Delta Force	Windows
1998	MiG-29 Fulcrum	Windows
1998	F-16 Multirole Fighter	Windows
1999	Jet Pack (compilation)	Windows
1999	F-22 Lightning 3	Windows
1999	Armored Fist 3	Windows
1999	Delta Force 2	Windows
2000	Delta Force: Land Warrior	Windows
2000	Tachyon: The Fringe	Windows
2000	Flight Mania (compilation)	Windows
2001	Comanche 4	Windows
2002	Air Attack Pack (compilation)	Windows
2002	Delta Force Trilogy (compilation)	Windows
2002	Delta Force: Urban Warfare	PlayStation
2002	Delta Force: Task Force Dagger	Windows
2003	Devastation	Windows
2003	Highland Warriors	Windows
2003	Special Forces Pack (compilation)	Windows
2003	Delta Force: Black Hawk Down	Windows, Mac, PS2, Xbox
2004	Delta Force: Black Hawk Down - Team Sabre	Windows, PS2
2004	Joint Operations: Typhoon Rising	Windows
2004	Joint Operations: Escalation	Windows
2005	Joint Operations: Combined Arms (compilation)	Windows
2005	Delta Force: Xtreme	Windows
2009	Delta Force: Xtreme 2	Windows
2009	Delta Force Bootcamp (compilation)	Windows
Cancelled	Super Mario's Wacky Worlds	CD-i
Cancelled	Maximum Overkill	Windows
Cancelled	Necrocide: The Dead Must Die	Windows
Cancelled	Delta Force: Angel Falls	Windows
