= John A. Garcia =

- Born: 1949 (age 76–77); Galicia, Spain
- Education: DePaul University; London Film School
- Occupation: Entrepreneur
- Years active: 1980–present
- Known for: Novalogic
- Children: 2

John A. Garcia (born 1949) is a Spanish-born American best known as the founder and CEO of the video game company Novalogic. He designed several of the games the company developed.

== Career ==
Born in Galicia, Spain, Garcia's family immigrated to the United States when he was a child. He is the brother of oncologist Dr. Francisco Garcia-Moreno and the father of two.

After graduating from DePaul University, Garcia went on to study film at the London Film School.

Garcia co-founded one of the first commercial film production companies in the United Arab Emirates. In the late 1970s, he moved to Southern California, where he worked as Vice President at Datasoft, and was responsible for production of at least 40 software titles.

He founded NovaLogic, Inc. in 1985 and was the CEO until its acquisition by THQ Nordic in October 2016.

In 1999, Garcia reached out to Lockheed Martin, the American military technology company, for a partnership with NovaLogic.

== Philanthropy ==
Garcia has acquired multiple California estates that he uses to support charitable causes. He has joined up with Doctors Without Borders to raise money for their international efforts. The 2007 event was used as a model in the 2008–2009 Doctors Without Borders fund-raising manual.

=== Controversy ===
Garcia's choice to rent one of his Malibu homes, traditionally used for charitable events, to commercial group Polaroid, came under scrutiny in 2007. Neighbors at his beach home complained that celebrities Lindsay Lohan and Paris Hilton were bringing an unwanted element to the community. The story was put on the cover of the LA Times but quickly died down once Polaroid's contract with Garcia expired.
