= Comanche (video game series) =

- Cover art for Comanche CD
- Genre: Combat flight simulation
- Developer: Novalogic
- Publishers: Novalogic, THQ Nordic

Comanche is a series of simulation games published by NovaLogic, later THQ Nordic after their acquisition. The goal of each of these games is to fly military missions in a RAH-66 Comanche attack helicopter, which was in development and prototyping at the time of release.

Comanche was the first commercial flight simulation based on voxel technology via the company's proprietary Voxel Space engine (written entirely in assembly language). This rendering technique allowed for much more detailed and realistic terrain compared to simulations based on vector graphics at that time.

== Games ==
Releases timeline
1992	Comanche: Maximum Overkill
1993	Comanche: Global Challenge
1993	Comanche: Over the Edge
1994	Comanche CD
1995	Werewolf vs Comanche
1996	Comanche 2
1997	Comanche 3
1998	Comanche Gold
1999–2000
2001	Comanche 4
2002–2020
2021	Comanche

Throughout the years, several games and add-ons have been published:

- Comanche: Maximum Overkill (1992)
  - Comanche: Global Challenge (1993) - three new campaigns
  - Comanche: Over the Edge (1993) - four new campaigns
  - Comanche CD (1994) - a compilation of Maximum Overkill and mission disks, plus 10 bonus missions. Rereleased in 1997 from SoftKey As Comanche CD Special Edition. Includes a demo of America Online, and features Windows 95 compatibility.
- Werewolf vs Comanche (1995) - a pack of two games with a compatible multiplayer mode
  - Comanche 2 (1996) - the stand-alone release of the Comanche portion of Werewolf vs. Comanche.
- Comanche 3 (1997)
  - Comanche Gold (1998) - Comanche 3 with additional campaigns and various enhancements
- Comanche 4 (2001)
- Comanche (2021) - set in the near-future. Early access version was released on Steam on 12 March 2020 1.0 release was on 26 August 2021. The game was developed by Nukklear before early access release and then by Ashborne Games.

== Reception ==
Computer Gaming World's reviewer—United States Army Aviation AH-64 pilot Bryan Walker—liked Comanche Maximum Overkill in 1993, calling it an "eye-popping glimpse into 21st-century helicopter warfare". He stated that it created a "more believable terrain model than the Army's Combat Mission Simulator" and was the first game to replicate "the thrill of low-altitude flying". Walker enjoyed the flight model's stability and ease of use, and reported that the cockpit corresponded to MANPRINT ("Manpower and Personnel Integration") principles. He compared the helicopter's handling as akin to "a slug ... joystick jocks may end up gritting their teeth", and also criticized the "meager" choice of missions and enemy targets, and the unrealistically high durability and weapon loads. Walker nonetheless concluded that "cutting-edge graphics firepower gives [it] the edge to sweep more than a couple of competitors off the battlefield".

In 1993 Walker reviewed Mission Disk One for the magazine, stating that he "honestly expected more from an add-on disk that retails for $40". He criticized the lack of improvement in the flight model ("CMO's Comanche still flies like Barney Fife is at the controls"), and concluded that it "is like refueling a gunship without rearming it". In 1994 Walker liked the harder difficulty of the Over the Edge mission disk's "40 tough new missions", as well as the improved graphics and controls. He concluded that the expansion "clearly shows the superiority of the new features and makes for a far more enjoyable game". Walker also liked the Comanche CD compilation but only recommended it to those new to the game or without the expansions. He reiterated, however, that "many of the limitations I noted in my review of the original CMO are still present ... it would be nice to see NovaLogic produce a chopper title on par with Falcon 3.0 in the technical realism arena".

A reviewer for Next Generation opined that "For pure multiplayer action, Werewolf vs. Comanche is hard to beat." He noted that because the two crafts are on separate discs, gamers only needed to buy half as many copies of the game as the number of players in a networked session. He scored it four out of five stars.

Comanche Maximum Overdrive was nominated for an award at the 1993 Game Developers Conference.

The overall Comanche series achieved combined global sales of 2.5 million copies by November 2001, before the release of Comanche 4.

Comanche Mac received 4 out of 5 stars from MacUser. In 1995, Flux magazine ranked Comanche 18th on their Top 100 Video Games. They praised the game calling it: "One of the most graphically pleasing flight sims around."

== See also ==
- LHX Attack Chopper
- G-Police
- Enemy Engaged: RAH-66 Comanche vs. KA-52 Hokum
- Strike (series)
