= Index of Windows games (D) =

This is an index of Microsoft Windows games.

This list has been split into multiple pages. Please use the Table of Contents to browse it.

Title	Released	Developer	Publisher
D-Day	2004	Monte Cristo Multimedia	Digital Reality
The Da Vinci Code	2006	The Collective	2K Games
Daikatana	2000	Ion Storm	Eidos Interactive
Damage Incorporated	1997	Paranoid Productions	WizardWorks
Damnation	2009	Blue Omega Entertainment	Codemasters
Dancing with the Stars	2007	Aurona	THQ Valusoft
Dangerous High School Girls in Trouble!	2008	Mousechief	Mousechief
Dangerous Waters	2005	Sonalysts Combat Simulations	Strategy First
Darby the Dragon	1996	Capitol Multimedia	Broderbund
Darius Gaiden	1997	Taito	Taito
Dark Age of Camelot	2001	Mythic Entertainment	Mythic Entertainment, Wanadoo
Dark and Light	2006	NP Cube	Farlan Entertainment
Dark Earth	1997	Kalisto Entertainment	Microprose
The Dark Eye: Chains of Satinav	2012	Daedalic Entertainment	Deep Silver
The Dark Eye: Demonicon	2013	Noumena Studios	Kalypso Media
The Dark Eye: Memoria	2013	Daedalic Entertainment	Deep Silver
Dark Fall	2002	XXv Productions	XXv Productions
Dark Fall II: Lights Out	2004	Darkling Room	The Adventure Company, Darkling Room
Dark Fall: Lost Souls	2009	Darkling Room	Iceberg Interactive
Dark Horizon	2008	Quazar Studio	Paradox Interactive
Dark Messiah of Might and Magic	2006	Arkane Studios, Floodgate Entertainment	Ubisoft
The Dark Pictures Anthology: The Devil in Me	2022	Supermassive Games	Bandai Namco Entertainment
The Dark Pictures Anthology: House of Ashes	2021	Supermassive Games	Bandai Namco Entertainment
The Dark Pictures Anthology: Little Hope	2020	Supermassive Games	Bandai Namco Entertainment
The Dark Pictures Anthology: Man of Medan	2019	Supermassive Games	Bandai Namco Entertainment
Dark Reign 2	2000	Pandemic Studios	Activision
Dark Reign: The Future of War	1997	Auran	Activision
Dark Sector	2008	Digital Extremes	D3 Publisher of America
Dark Souls	2012	FromSoftware	Namco Bandai Games
Dark Souls II	2014	FromSoftware	Namco Bandai Games
Dark Souls III	2016	FromSoftware	Namco Bandai Games
Dark Sun Online: Crimson Sands	1996	Strategic Simulations, Inc.	Strategic Simulations, Inc.
Dark Void	2010	Airtight Games	Capcom
Darkeden	1997	SOFTON Entertainment, Inc	SOFTON Entertainment, Inc
Darkened Skye	2002	Boston Animation	Simon & Schuster, Oxygen Games
Darkest Hour: Europe '44-'45	2008	Darklight Games	Valve
Darkest of Days	2009	8monkey Labs	Phantom EFX
Darkfall	2009	Aventurine SA	Audiovisual Enterprises SA
Darklight Conflict	1997	Rage Software	Electronic Arts
Darkness Within 2: The Dark Lineage	2010	Zoetrope Interactive	Iceberg Interactive
Darkness Within: In Pursuit of Loath Nolder	2007	Zoetrope Interactive	Lighthouse Interactive
Darksiders	2010	Vigil Games	THQ
Darksiders Genesis	2019	Airship Syndicate	THQ Nordic
Darksiders II	2012	Vigil Games	THQ
Darksiders III	2018	Gunfire Games	THQ Nordic
DarkSpace	2001	Palestar	Palestar, Got Game Entertainment
Darkspore	2011	Maxis Emeryville	Electronic Arts
DarkStar One	2006	Ascaron Entertainment	CDV Software
Darkstone	1999	Delphine Software International	Electronic Arts, Gathering of Developers
Darkwind: War on Wheels	2007	Sam Redfern	Psychic Software
Darkwood	2017	Acid Wizard Studio	Acid Wizard Studio
Darwinia	2005	Introversion Software	Introversion Software
Dave Mirra Freestyle BMX	2000	Z-Axis	Acclaim
Dawn of Fantasy	2009	Reverie World Studios	Lighthouse Interactive
Dawn of Magic	2005	SkyFallen Entertainment	1C Company, Deep Silver
Dawn of Magic 2	2009	SkyFallen Entertainment	Take-Two Interactive, Kalypso Media
Day of Defeat	2000	Valve	Activision
Day of Defeat: Source	2005	Valve	Valve
Daylight	2014	Zombie Studios	Atlus
Daymare: 1994 Sandcastle	2023	Invader Studios	Leonardo Interactive
Daymare: 1998	2019	Invader Studios	Destructive Creations, All in! Games
Days Gone	2021	Bend Studio	Sony Interactive Entertainment
Daytona USA	1996	Sega-AM2, Sega-AM4	Sega
Daytona USA: Championship Circuit Edition	1996	Sega-AM3	Sega
DC Universe Online	2010	Sony Online Austin	Sony Online Entertainment
Dead Cells	2018	Motion Twin	Motion Twin
Dead in Vinland	2018	CCCP	Dear Villagers
Dead Island	2009	Techland	Deep Silver
Dead Island 2	2023	Dambuster Studios	Deep Silver
Dead Island: Riptide	2013	Techland	Deep Silver
Dead Man's Diary	2022	TML-Studios	TML-Studios
Dead Man's Hand	2004	Human Head Studios	Atari
Dead or Alive 6	2019	Koei Tecmo	Koei Tecmo
Dead Reefs	2007	Streko-Graphics	The Adventure Company
Dead Rising	2016	Capcom, QLOC	Capcom
Dead Rising 2	2010	Blue Castle Games	Capcom
Dead Rising 2: Off the Record	2011	Capcom Vancouver	Capcom
Dead Rising 3	2014	Capcom Vancouver	Capcom
Dead Rising 4	2016	Capcom Vancouver	Microsoft Studios, Capcom
Dead Space	2008	Visceral Games	Electronic Arts
Dead Space	2023	Motive Studio	Electronic Arts
Dead Space 2	2011	Visceral Games	Electronic Arts
Dead Space 3	2013	Visceral Games	Electronic Arts
Dead to Rights	2002	Namco	Namco
Dead to Rights II	2005	Namco	Namco
Deadfall Adventures	2013	The Farm 51	Nordic Games
Deadliest Catch: Alaskan Storm	2008	Liquid Dragon Studios	Greenwave Games
Deadlock II: Shrine Wars	1998	Cyberlore Studios	Accolade
Deadlock: Planetary Conquest	1996	Accolade	Accolade
Deadly Dozen	2001	nFusion	Infogrames
Deadly Dozen: Pacific Theater	2002	nFusion	Infogrames
Deadly Premonition	2013	Access Games,	Rising Star Games, Ignition Entertainment
Deadly Premonition 2: A Blessing in Disguise	2022	Toybox Inc., White Owls Inc., Now Production	Toybox Inc., Rising Star Games
Deadly Rooms of Death	1997	Webfoot Technologies	Webfoot Technologies
Deadly Tide	1996	Rainbow Studios	Microsoft
Deal or No Deal	2006	Gravity-i	Mindscape
Dear Esther	2008	The Chinese Room	The Chinese Room
Death Come True	2020	Too Kyo Games	IzanagiGames
Death Rally	2009	Remedy Entertainment	Remedy Entertainment
Death Stranding	2020	Kojima Productions	505 Games
Death to Spies	2007	Haggard Games	1C Company, Atari
Death to Spies: Moment of Truth	2009	Haggard Games	1C Company
DeathDrome	1996	Zipper Interactive	Viacom New Media
Deathloop	2021	Arkane Studios	Bethesda Softworks
DeathSpank	2010	Hothead Games	Hothead Games
Deathtrap	2015	NeocoreGames	NeocoreGames
Deathtrap Dungeon	1998	Eidos Interactive	Eidos Interactive
December When There Is No Angel	2003	Leaf	Aquaplus
Decisive Battles of WWII: Korsun Pocket	2003	Strategic Studies Group	Matrix Games
Deeeer Simulator	2021	Naspapa Games	Active Gaming Media
Deer Avenger 2: Deer in the City	1999	Hypnotix	Simon & Schuster Interactive
DEFCON	2006	Introversion Software	Pinnacle Entertainment Group
Defender's Quest: Valley of the Forgotten	2012	Level Up Labs	Level Up Labs
Defense Grid: The Awakening	2008	Hidden Path Entertainment	Aspyr Media
Deliver Us Mars	2023	KeokeN Interactive	Frontier Foundry
Deliver Us the Moon	2018	KeokeN Interactive	Wired Productions
Delta Force	1998	NovaLogic	NovaLogic
Delta Force 2	1999	Novalogic	Novalogic
Delta Force: Angel Falls	2010	NovaLogic	NovaLogic
Delta Force: Black Hawk Down	2003	NovaLogic	NovaLogic
Delta Force: Black Hawk Down – Team Sabre	2004	Ritual Entertainment	NovaLogic
Delta Force: Land Warrior	2000	NovaLogic	NovaLogic
Delta Force: Task Force Dagger	2002	Zombie Studios	NovaLogic
Delta Force: Urban Warfare	2002	Rebellion Developments	NovaLogic
Delta Force: Xtreme	2005	NovaLogic	NovaLogic
Delta Force: Xtreme 2	2009	NovaLogic	NovaLogic
Delver	2018	Priority Interrupt	Priority Interrupt
Demigod	2009	Gas Powered Games	Stardock
Democracy	2005	Positech Games	Tri-Synergy
DemonStar	1997	Mountain King Studios	Mountain King Studios
Depths of Peril	2007	Soldak Entertainment	Soldak Entertainment
Descent II	1996	Parallax Software	Interplay Entertainment
Descent 3	1999	Outrage Entertainment	Interplay Productions
Descent: FreeSpace – The Great War	1998	Volition	Interplay Entertainment
Desert Rats vs. Afrika Korps	2004	Digital Reality	Encore Software, Inc,
Desperados: Wanted Dead or Alive	2001	Spellbound Entertainment	Atari
Desperados 2: Cooper's Revenge	2006	Spellbound Entertainment	Atari
Desperados III	2020	Mimimi Games	THQ Nordic
Destination: Treasure Island	2007	Kheops Studio	Nobilis
Destroy All Humans	2020	Black Forest Games	THQ Nordic
Destroy All Humans! 2	2006	Pandemic Studios	THQ
Destruction Derby 2	1996	Reflections Interactive	Psygnosis
Detroit: Become Human	2019	Quantic Dream	Quantic Dream
Deus Ex	2000	Ion Storm	Eidos Interactive
Deus Ex: Human Revolution	2011	Eidos Montréal	Square Enix
Deus Ex: Invisible War	2003	Ion Storm	Eidos Interactive
Deus Ex: Mankind Divided	2016	Eidos Montréal	Square Enix
Devastation	2003	Digitalo Studios	ARUSH Entertainment
Devil Daggers	2016	Sorath	Sorath
The Devil Inside	2000	Gamesquad	Cryo Interactive
Devil May Cry 3: Dante's Awakening	2005	Capcom Production Studio 1	Capcom
Devil May Cry 4	2008	Capcom	Capcom
Devotion	2019	Red Candle Games	Red Candle Games
Diablo	1996	Blizzard North	Blizzard Entertainment, Ubisoft
Diablo II	2000	Blizzard North	Blizzard Entertainment
Diablo II: Lord of Destruction	2001	Blizzard North	Blizzard Entertainment
Diablo: Hellfire	1997	Synergistic Software	Sierra On-Line
Diablo III	2012	Blizzard Entertainment	Blizzard Entertainment
Diabolical Digits	1995	Créalude	CFI, Millennium Media Group, Dell Magazines
Die by the Sword	1998	Treyarch	Tantrum Entertainment
Die Hard Trilogy	1996	Probe Entertainment	Fox Interactive
Die Hard Trilogy 2: Viva Las Vegas	2000	n-Space	Fox Interactive
Die Hard: Nakatomi Plaza	2002	Piranha Games	Sierra Entertainment
Dig Dug Deeper	2001	Creature Labs	Infogrames
Digger	2003	Windmill Software	Windmill Software
Diggles: The Myth of Fenris	2001	Innonics	Strategy First
Digital Combat Simulator	2008	Eagle Dynamics	The Fighter Collection
Diner Dash	2003	Gamelab, Glu Mobile	PlayFirst
Diner Dash 2: Restaurant Rescue	2006	PlayFirst	PlayFirst
Diner Dash: Flo on the Go	2006	PlayFirst	PlayFirst
Diner Dash: Hometown Hero	2007	PlayFirst	PlayFirst
Dino Crisis	1999	Capcom Production Studio 4	Capcom
Dino Crisis 2	2000	Capcom Production Studio 4	Capcom
Dino Island	2002	Monte Cristo	Monte Cristo
Dirt 5	2020	Codemasters	Codemasters
Dirt Track Racing	2000	Ratbag Games	Ratbag Games
Dirt Track Racing 2	2002	Ratbag Games	Ratbag Games
Dirt Track Racing: Sprint Cars	2000	Ratbag Games	Ratbag Games
Disciples II: Dark Prophecy	2002	Strategy First	Infogrames, Stardock
Disciples III: Renaissance	2009	Akella	Strategy First, Akella
Disciples: Sacred Lands	1999	Strategy First	GT Interactive
Disco Elysium	2019	ZA/UM	ZA/UM
Discworld II: Missing Presumed...!?	1996	Perfect Entertainment	Psygnosis
Discworld Noir	1999	Perfect Entertainment	GT Interactive
Dishonored	2012	Arkane Studios	Bethesda Softworks
Dishonored 2	2016	Arkane Lyon	Bethesda Softworks
Dishonored: Death of the Outsider	2017	Arkane Lyon	Bethesda Softworks
Disintegration	2020	V1 Interactive	Private Division
Disney Infinity	2013	Avalanche Software	Disney Interactive Studios
Disney Infinity 2.0	2014	Avalanche Software	Disney Interactive Studios
Disney Infinity 3.0	2015	Avalanche Software	Disney Interactive Studios
Disney Magicboard Online	2007	Shanda	The Walt Disney Company
Disney Princess: Enchanted Journey	2007	Papaya Studio	Disney Interactive
Disney Sing It	2008	Zoe Mode	Disney Interactive
Disney's Dinosaur	2000	Ubisoft	Disney Interactive
Disney's Villains' Revenge	1999	Disney Interactive	Disney Interactive
Dispatch	2025	AdHoc Studio	AdHoc Studio
Distant Worlds 2	2022	Code Force	Slitherine Software
Divi-Dead	1998	C's Ware	Otaku Publishing Ltd.
Divine Divinity	2002	Larian Studios	CDV Software
Divinity II	2009	Larian Studios	Dtp entertainment, Cdv Software Entertainment
Divinity: Dragon Commander	2013	Larian Studios	Larian Studios
Divinity: Original Sin	2014	Larian Studios	Larian Studios
Divinity: Original Sin II	2017	Larian Studios	Larian Studios
DJMax Trilogy	2008	Pentavision	Pentavision
Dofus	2005	Ankama Games	Ankama Games
Dolmen	2022	Massive Work Studio	Prime Matter
Dominant Species	1998	Red Storm Entertainment	Red Storm Entertainment
Domination	2005	Wargaming	DreamCatcher Games
Dominion: Storm Over Gift 3	1998	Ion Storm	Eidos Interactive
Dominions 3: The Awakening	2006	Illwinter Game Design	Shrapnel Games
Dominions II: The Ascension Wars	2003	Illwinter Game Design	Shrapnel Games
Dominions: Priests, Prophets and Pretenders	2002	Illwinter Game Design	Shrapnel Games
Domino Master	2004	TikGames	TikGames
Don't Knock Twice	2017	Wales Interactive	Wales Interactive
Don't Quit Your Day Job	1996	Philips Interactive Media	Improvisation ManyMedia
Donald Duck: Goin' Quackers	2000	Ubisoft Montreal	Ubisoft
Donald Trump's Real Estate Tycoon	2005	Airborne	Activision Value
Doom	2016	id Software	Bethesda Softworks
Doom Eternal	2020	Id Software	Bethesda Softworks
Doom II	1995	id Software	GT Interactive
Doom 3	2004	id Software	Activision
Doom 3: Resurrection of Evil	2005	Nerve Software	Activision
Dorfromantik	2022	Toukana Interactive	Toukana Interactive
Dōsei	1997	Tactics	Nexton
Dota 2	2013	Valve	Valve
Double Dealing Character	2013	Team Shanghai Alice	Team Shanghai Alice
Double Kick Heroes	2020	Headbang Club	Headbang Club
Double Spoiler	2010	Team Shanghai Alice	Team Shanghai Alice
Double Switch	1995	Digital Pictures	Digital Pictures
Down in the Dumps	1996	Haiku Studios	Philips Media
Downtown Run	2003	Ubisoft	Ubisoft
Dr. Blob's Organism	2003	Digital Eel	Cheapass Games
Dr. Brain: Action Reaction	1999	Knowledge Adventure	Knowledge Adventure
Dracula 2: The Last Sanctuary	2000	Wanadoo Edition, Canal+ Multimedia	Cryo Interactive
Dracula 3: The Path of the Dragon	2008	Kheops Studio	Microids, Encore Games
Dracula Twins	2006	Legendo Entertainment	Legendo Entertainment
Dracula: Resurrection	1999	Index+, Canal+ Multimedia, France Telecom Multimedia	Microids
Dragon Age II	2011	BioWare	Electronic Arts
Dragon Age: Inquisition	2014	BioWare	Electronic Arts
Dragon Age: Origins	2009	BioWare	Electronic Arts
Dragon Age: Origins – Awakening	2010	BioWare	Electronic Arts
Dragon Age: The Veilguard	2024	BioWare	Electronic Arts
Dragon Ball FighterZ	2018	Arc System Works	Namco Bandai Games
Dragon Ball Online	2009	NTL Inc., Bird Studio, Shueisha	CJ Internet Corporation, Namco Bandai Games
Dragon Ball Xenoverse	2015	Dimps	Namco Bandai Games
Dragon Ball Xenoverse 2	2016	Dimps	Namco Bandai Games
Dragon City	2019	Socialpoint	Socialpoint
Dragon Quest XI	2020	Square Enix	Square Enix
Dragon Riders: Chronicles of Pern	2001	Ubi Studios UK	Ubisoft
Dragon Throne: Battle of Red Cliffs	2002	Object Software Limited	Strategy First
Dragon's Dogma	2016	Capcom, QLOC	Capcom
Dragon's Dogma 2	2024	Capcom	Capcom
Dragon's Lair	1997	Digital Leisure	Digital Leisure
Dragon's Lair II: Time Warp	1996	ReadySoft Incorporated	ReadySoft Incorporated
Dragon's Lair 3D: Return to the Lair	2002	Dragonstone Software	Ubisoft
DragonHeart: Fire & Steel	1996	Funcom	Acclaim
Drakan: Order of the Flame	1999	Surreal Software	Psygnosis
Drake of the 99 Dragons	2003	Idol FX	Majesco
Drakensang: The Dark Eye	2008	Radon Labs	dtp entertainment, THQ, Eidos Interactive, Fx Interactive
Drakensang: The River of Time	2010	Radon Labs	dtp entertainment
Draugen	2019	Red Thread Games	Red Thread Games
DreadOut	2014	Digital Happiness	Digital Happiness
Dream Chamber	2013	DarkWave Games	Microids
Dream Match Tennis	2006	Bimboosoft Co. Ltd	Bimboosoft Co. Ltd
Dream Pinball 3D	2008	TopWare Interactive	SouthPeak Games
Dreamlords	2007	LockPick Entertainment	LockPick Entertainment, Aeria Games & Entertainment, gamigo AG, Akella
Driftland: The Magic Revival	2019	Star Drifters	Star Drifters
Driftmoon	2013	Interactive Kingdom	Interactive Kingdom
Driv3r	2004	Reflections Interactive	Atari
Driver	1999	Reflections Interactive	GT Interactive
Driver: Parallel Lines	2006	Reflections Interactive	Ubisoft
Drome Racers	2002	Attention to Detail	Electronic Arts, Lego Interactive
Drop Mania	1999	Detonium Interactive	Suomen Kotijaatelo Oy
Droplitz	2009	Blitz Arcade	Atlus
Drowned God	1996	Epic Multimedia Group	Inscape
Drug Dealer Simulator	2020	Byterunners	Movie Games S.A.
Druidstone	2019	Ctrl Alt Ninja	Ctrl Alt Ninja
Druuna: Morbus Gravis	2001	Artematica	Microïds
Ducati World Championship	2006	Artematica	Ubisoft
Duck Dynasty	2014	Fun Labs	Activision
Duke Nukem 3D Atomic Edition	2013	3D Realms Entertainment	3D Realms Entertainment
Duke Nukem Forever	2011	Gearbox Software	2K
Duke Nukem: Manhattan Project	2002	Sunstorm Interactive	ARUSH Entertainment
Dune 2000	1998	Intelligent Games	Westwood Studios
Dungeon Defenders	2011	Trendy Entertainment	Trendy Entertainment
Dungeon Keeper	1997	Bullfrog Productions	Electronic Arts
Dungeon Keeper 2	1999	Bullfrog Productions	Electronic Arts
Dungeon Lords	2005	Heuristic Park	DreamCatcher Interactive, FX Interactive, Crimson Cow, 1C Company, Typhoon Games
Dungeon Runners	2007	NCsoft	NCsoft
Dungeon Siege	2002	Gas Powered Games	Microsoft Game Studios
Dungeon Siege II	2005	Gas Powered Games	Microsoft Game Studios
Dungeon Siege II: Broken World	2006	Gas Powered Games	2K Games
Dungeons & Dragons: Dragonshard	2005	Liquid Entertainment	Atari
Dungeons & Dragons Online	2006	Turbine, Inc.	Atari
DUSK	2018	David Szymanski	New Blood Interactive
Dust: A Tale of the Wired West	1995	Cyberflix	GTE Entertainment
Dust: An Elysian Tail	2012	Humble Hearts	Microsoft Studios
DX-Ball 2	1998	Longbow Digital Arts	Longbow Digital Arts
Dying Light	2015	Techland	Warner Bros. Interactive Entertainment
Dying Light 2	2022	Techland	Techland
Dying Light: The Following	2016	Techland	Warner Bros. Interactive Entertainment
Dynasty Warriors 4	2003	Omega Force	Koei
Dynasty Warriors 6	2007	Omega Force	Koei
Dynasty Warriors Online	2006	Omega Force	Koei
Dystopia	2005	Team Dystopia	Valve Corporation
