= Greg Siegele =

Australian video game developer

Greg Siegele is an Australian businessman. He co-founded Ratbag Games Pty Ltd, an Australian video game developer of such games as Powerslide, The Dukes of Hazzard: Return of the General Lee and World of Outlaws: Sprint Cars 2002.

Greg developed his love for computers, and particularly programming and playing computer games, while attending South Australian private school Prince Alfred College. Although he left school with visions of becoming a top lawyer, after spending a couple of years practicing as a lawyer he decided he liked video games better.

Ratbag Games was founded in 1993 in Adelaide, South Australia by friends Greg Siegele and Richard Harrison. Initially known as Emergent Games, the company took 3 years to finish a prototype for their first title Powerslide. Following its acquisition by Midway Games on 4 August 2005 the company was known as Midway Studios Australia. Employees at the studio were told on 13 December 2005 that it was going to be closed by its parent company, and subsequently was two days later on the 15th, leaving the staff employed there without a job.
