= Leadfoot (video game) =

2001 video game

- Scan of the booklet included with the game.
- Developer: Ratbag Games
- Publishers: NA: WizardWorks; EU: Take-Two Interactive
- Designer: David Hewitt
- Platform: Microsoft Windows
- Release: NA: May 22, 2001; EU: August 2001
- Genre: Racing
- Modes: Single-player, multiplayer

Leadfoot: Stadium Off-Road Racing, or Leadfoot for short, is a computer video game by the now defunct Ratbag Games. It is a spin-off of the dirt track racing series by Ratbag, which includes Dirt Track Racing, Dirt Track Racing: Sprint Cars and Dirt Track Racing 2. It is a racing game simulation reproducing the sport of stadium off-road racing. Pick-up trucks and buggies race around dirt tracks built inside stadiums - Supercross on four wheels.

== Movie Maker ==
Software included in Leadfoot allows for the exporting of video clips of game action in AVI format.

== Race vehicles ==
Players can choose from 8 different vehicles, in 2 classes.

== Reception ==
Reception

Aggregate score
Aggregator	Score
Metacritic	69/100

Review scores
Publication	Score
Computer Gaming World	3.5/5
GameSpot	7.1/10
GameZone	8.5/10
IGN	7.8/10
PC Gamer (US)	78%

The game received "average" reviews according to the review aggregation website Metacritic.

Computer Games Magazine nominated the game as the best racing game of 2001, but ultimately gave the award to NASCAR Racing 4.
