= Gamestar Mechanic =

Video game

Gamestar Mechanic is an online game creator and community designed to teach the guiding principles of game design and systems thinking. The game is published by E-Line Media and supported by a partnership between E-Line Media and the Institute of Play.

== Project history ==
Initial development of Gamestar was supported by a grant from the John D. and Catherine T. MacArthur Foundation based on a grant proposal authored by James Paul Gee and Eric Zimmerman. Initial design and development of the game was by Gamelab in partnership with Katie Salen, The Institute of Play and the Academic Advanced Distributed Learning Co-Lab (AADLC) at the University of Wisconsin–Madison. The game was released commercially in the Fall of 2010 and is currently supported by a partnership between educational game publisher E-Line Media and the Institute of Play.

On September 29, 2020, it was announced that the current website would be shut down on December 31, 2020, due to the planned deprecation of Adobe Flash. However, on November 20, 2020, it was instead announced that the game would remain available as a downloadable desktop application for Windows and macOS. The desktop application was released on December 15, 2020 and can be downloaded from the original website.

== Audience and game play ==
The game is optimized for youth ages 8–14. Players learn the principles of game design by playing a narrative-based Quest where they play, repair and build games using the in-game design tools. As they advance in the Quest, players also earn "sprites" (characters, avatars, enemies, etc...) for use in their own games. At any time, players can switch to their Workshops and make an original game using the assets they have earned. Players can publish their games to an online community within the platform called Game Alley where other users can play and leave feedback on their games.

Playing on the website, now app, is free of charge, but there were once premium, now free, options available for both consumer and educational use.

An online learning program was once offered in which students can take an online course in game design with an instructor and receive video feedback on their designs from professionals in the game industries.

== Sprites ==
Sprites are all of the things that players can unlock and use in their games. Most sprites can be earned from the quests "Addison Joins the League", "Addison Joins the Rogue", and "Dungeon of the Rogue". The other sprites that can be earned are from the challenges. The "Pink Block Caper", and the "Background Challenge" are some. Some challenges are seasonal, but once the player wins the challenge and earns the sprites from them, they can keep them forever. The "Wild West" challenge is an example. The final way to get some is from the sprite packs that players can buy in the store. The "Freezer pack" and the "Autumn pack" are examples. If the player has completed all of these tasks, they now have almost all of the sprites that are available for players. Most sprites are either avatars, enemies, blocks, items, or systems, but some of which are in forms of backgrounds and music. As well as a way to earn sprites that are unobtainable through challenges or the quests, as shown in numerous games made specifically to show redeem codes which included avatars, blocks, items, enemies, bosses, backgrounds, and even a few challenges.

Sprite Packs:

- Underwater Pack
- Freeze Pack
- Autumn Pack
- Bugging Out Pack
- Mystical Pack
- Gateway Pack
- Winter Holiday Pack
- Tank Trials Pack

== Usage ==
As of March 2014, the game has been used to create over 500,000 games that have been played over 15 million times. Over 6,000 schools and community organizations have adopted the platform.

As of October 15, 2020, there are over 2,023,545 games on the platform, and at least 1,695,751 users.

== Awards ==
Gamestar has won numerous awards for excellence in educational technology and children's media including

- 2012 American Association of School Librarians (AASL) Top 25 Best Website for Teaching and Learning
- 2011 Kids at Play Interactive (KAPi) Award: Tool for Digital Creativity and Empowerment
- 2011 International Serious Play Awards Gold Medal Winner
- 2011 Indiecade Awards Finalist
