= Martin Mystère: Operation Dorian Gray =

2004 video game

- Developer: Artematica
- Publishers: ITA: Leader S.p.a.; EU: GMX Media; NA: The Adventure Company
- Platform: Windows
- Release: ITA: December 2004; UK: June 24, 2005; FRA: August 26, 2005; NA: March 14, 2006
- Genre: Adventure game
- Mode: Single-player

Martin Mystère: Operation Dorian Gray (known as Crime Stories: From the Files of Martin Mystère in North America) is the only video game adaptation of the Italian sci-fi detective comic-book franchise called Martin Mystère, starring a detective and his assistant, Java. It is a point-and-click adventure game, published by Leader S.p.a. in Italy, The Adventure Company in North America, and GMX Media in Europe. A Macintosh version was planned, but was cancelled in the evaluation stage. Versions for PlayStation 2 and Xbox were also planned, but were also cancelled.

== Plot ==
The player takes on the role of Martin Mystere, a young private eye who is looking into the brutal killing of Professor Eulemberg, a renowned scientist.

== Gameplay ==
The gameplay is standard for graphic adventure games: search for items in order to solve logic puzzles.

== Development ==
Development for the game began around 2002. Most of the time was invested on the storyboard, which was heavily based on the original comic strips of Martin Mystère. The models for the graphics started as layouts on paper. The models were output in Realtime 3D with octagonal views and pre-rendered backgrounds (similar to Druuna: Morbus Gravis and Syberia) and animated with 3DS Max.

== Critical reception ==
Reception

Aggregate score
Aggregator	Score
Metacritic	45/100

Review scores
Publication	Score
4Players	59%
Adventure Gamers	3/5
Computer Games Magazine	1/5
GameSpot	4.1/10
GameSpy	1.5/5
GameStar	51%
GameZone	5.9/10
IGN	5.2/10
Jeuxvideo.com	11/20
PC Gamer (US)	48%
PC Games (DE)	66%

The game received "generally unfavorable reviews" according to the review aggregation website Metacritic.

Computer Games Magazine gave a scathing review describing the game as "tragic", adding that it was too over-enthusiastic. IGN deemed it "generic" and GameSpot called it "archaic". Game Chronicles thought the puzzles were illogical and the story didn't make sense.
