= Daniel Masson =

Daniel Masson may refer to:

- Daniel Masson (cyclist) (born 1897), French cyclist
- Daniel Masson (composer) (born 1955), French composer

== See also ==
- Daniel Mason (born c. 1976), American novelist and physician
