= Diner Dash 2: Restaurant Rescue =

2006 video game

- Developer: PlayFirst
- Publisher: PlayFirst
- Producers: Michelle Woods; Kenny Dinkin; Chris Bennett
- Artists: Jeff Troupe; Barry Prioste
- Series: Diner Dash
- Engine: Playground SDK
- Platforms: Windows, Mac OS X
- Release: Windows; May 11, 2006; Mac OS X August 8, 2006
- Genres: Strategy, simulation
- Mode: Single-player

Diner Dash 2: Restaurant Rescue is the second installment in the popular game series Diner Dash preceded by Diner Dash and followed by Diner Dash: Flo on the Go. It is published by PlayFirst, like all other Diner Dash games.

== Story ==
Flo, a successful restaurant entrepreneur, has just watched the news that Mr. Big, a greedy landlord, wants to destroy four restaurants that belong to Darla, Tony, Margarita and Toshiro, respectively, so that he can build his own "Mega Multiplex Food Plaza" in their place. Flo runs to help each of her friends, and arrives just in time to stop Mr. Big and earn a chance to make enough money to pay him back.

After saving all four restaurants, a devastated Mr. Big considers retiring now that his plans have failed, but Flo has another idea. She converts his company into a fifth restaurant and has him serve as her assistant. Once this restaurant is a success, Flo grants Mr. Big full ownership of the restaurant before leaving.

== Reception and awards ==
Gamezebo stated that the game was a "pulse-pounding quick jolt of excitement". The game won a Zeeby award for Best Arcade & Action Game of 2006. During the 11th Annual Interactive Achievement Awards, Diner Dash 2 received a nomination for "Cellular Game of the Year" by the Academy of Interactive Arts & Sciences.

== See also ==
- Diner Dash
- Diner Dash: Flo on the Go
- Diner Dash: Hometown Hero
