= FuturePlay =

International video game conference

The International Academic Conference on the Future of Game Design and Technology, also known as FuturePlay, is an international academic conference that focuses on the future of video game design and technology. The most recent conference under that title was held in 2010.

== Overview ==
Future Play evolved from the former Computer Game Technology (CGT) Conference that had been initiated and run by Algoma University from 2002 to 2004. The conference was held annually in Toronto, Ontario, Canada. Future Play 2008 was hosted by Algoma and UOIT, each year bringing together key players from academics, industry, and government to advance game design and technology.

The conference focused on three themes: Future game development, future game impacts and application, future game talent. These issues were addressed through keynotes from leaders in academia and industry, peer-reviewed paper sessions, panel sessions, workshops, and exhibitions of posters, games, and the latest game technologies and supports from industry vendors.

== Academic competitions ==
=== Games competition ===
The Future Play Game Exhibition and Competition allows academic, independent, experimental, and/or student developers to gain recognition for their game-related work in a juried competition. Developers can submit to the exhibition in the following categories:

- Future Games: this category is for games that experiment with new game technologies or design concepts.
- Future Game Impacts and Applications: this category is for games that are built not necessarily for pure entertainment purposes (i.e. serious games), such as games that are for learning purposes.
- Future Game Talent: this category is primarily for students who have built an original, entertainment game title who wish to show off their talents, earn publicity for their school, gain personal recognition, and perhaps even find a publisher for the game.

Games competition winners are generally recognized in the trade press.

=== Academic papers ===
Paper submissions for the conference were original, unpublished research. Papers often included late-breaking advances and work-in-progress reports from ongoing research. All submissions were peer-reviewed and evaluated based on originality, technical and/or research content/depth, correctness, relevance to conference, contributions and readability.

== 2008 program ==
Future Play 2008 was hosted by Algoma University and the University of Ontario Institute of Technology. It was hosted in Toronto, Ontario, Canada. Speakers for the conference were Ken Perlin and Katie Salen. The theme of the conference was "Research. Play. Share."
