= Leadfoot =

Leadfoot may refer to:

- Leadfoot (band), a musical group
- Leadfoot (Transformers), a Transformers character
- Leadfoot (video game), a 2001 video game

== See also ==
- Ledfoot (Tim Scott McConnell, born 1958), American musician
