= Airport Mania: First Flight =

2008 video game

- Developers: Reflexive Entertainment, South Wind Games
- Publishers: Reflexive Entertainment, Lemon Games (WiiWare/DSiWare)
- Platforms: Windows, WiiWare, DSiWare, Macintosh, iOS, Android, Steam
- Release: April 2008: Windows, Mac; Feb 2009: iPhone; Aug 2010: iPad; Nov 2010: Android; June 5, 2026: Steam; WiiWare: NA: November 29, 2010; EU: June 16, 2011; DSiWare: NA: April 25, 2011; EU: June 16, 2011
- Genre: Time management
- Mode: Single-player

Airport Mania: First Flight is a 2008 time management game, that was jointly created by Reflexive Entertainment and South Wind Games. The player manages planes as they come in for landings. The game shifts through eight different airports of play, and the levels have different challenges, including a presidential plane (which has to land very quickly).

Airport Mania was released on iOS in April 2008 and during that year reached the number 1 overall ranking in iTunes in 12 countries including Canada, the United Kingdom, and Hong Kong.

A version was also made for WiiWare and was released in North America on November 29, 2010, and in Europe on June 16, 2011. There is also a version for DSiWare which was released in North America on April 25, 2011, and June 16, 2011, in Europe.

A sequel, Airport Mania 2: Wild Trips, was released on Windows, Macintosh, iOS, and Android in 2011.

The game would later get a re-release on Steam on June 5, 2026

== Reception ==
Reception

Review scores
Publication	Score
Eurogamer	8/10
Nintendo Life	9/10 (Wii)
Pocket Gamer	4/5
Common Sense Media	4/5
Gamezebo	3.5/5

Screenshot
