= Wedding Dash =

2007 video game

- Cover art of the Macintosh/Windows retail edition
- Developer: ImaginEngine
- Publishers: PlayFirst; Glu Mobile (BlackBerry, Mobile); Zoo Games (NDS)
- Series: Diner Dash
- Engine: Playground SDK
- Platforms: BlackBerry, iPhone OS, Mac OS X, Mobile phone, Nintendo DS, Microsoft Windows
- Release: September 4, 2007: Mac OS X; NA: September 4, 2007 Microsoft Windows; NA: September 26, 2007 Mobile phone; NA: June 30, 2008 iPhone OS; NA: January 27, 2009 BlackBerry; NA: August 12, 2009 Nintendo DS; NA: November 13, 2009
- Genres: Strategy, action
- Mode: Single-player

Wedding Dash is a strategy casual video game by PlayFirst. It was released on September 4, 2007, as a spin-off to the Diner Dash series of games. It has since received several sequels.

== Gameplay ==
The player plays as Quinn, a hopeful wedding planner. In every level, the player assists the couple in selecting wedding details including the food, decorations, and honeymoon. Once the couple has taken their vows, the player has to look out for obstacles that can wreck their perfect reception. There are two modes in this game, similar to Diner Dash: "Career Mode" and "Endless Reception". In Career Mode, the player must pay attention to their clients' wishes (the bride and groom) for the food, honeymoon destination, flowers, and cake. The wedding planner (Quinn) must also prevent the bride and groom from seeing any of the disasters that could or are happening at the wedding. In the Endless Reception mode, the player can make the reception last as long as possible without the bride getting angry and turning into a bridezilla. Once the bride turns into a bridezilla, the game ends.

== Plot ==
In Dinertown, Quinn is busy helping a bride prepare her dress. When the bride learns that her wedding planner has quit, she requests for Quinn to take over. Quinn isn't sure about this, but she finally agrees to the task after receiving advice from Flo. Once her first wedding plan is successful, she receives additional requests to prepare for more weddings. After four more successful weddings, she meets and befriends a photographer named Joe Wright.

== Sequels ==
=== Wedding Dash 2: Rings Around the World (2008) ===
Gameplay changes include the introduction of Joe, the photographer. Besides having to keep the bride and groom from seeing any of the disasters occurring at the wedding, the player must also take pictures of the guests. In the "Endless Reception" mode, the player must make the wedding last as long as possible before the groom gets angry and turns into Groom Kong, at which point the game is over.

In the game's story, Quinn is invited by Mr. Bigger, the owner of hotel chains around the world, to participate in a competition to select the best wedding planner to plan Mr. Bigger's daughter Adriana's wedding. The player goes to five scenic locations around the world: Niagara Falls, the Amazon rainforest, the Arabian Desert, an ice resort in Finland, and the royal resort in Thailand, competing against four other wedding planners. Quinn finds out that a competitor named Bella is cheating, and that Adriana has fallen in love with Quinn's photographer, Joe, and doesn't want to go through with her arranged marriage. In the end, Quinn win the contest, rejects the prize, and Adriana confesses her love to Joe, leaving Bella and Mr. Bigger in defeat.

=== Wedding Dash: Ready, Aim, Love! (2009) ===
In this sequel, Cupid has several people to shoot before the end of the year or he is out of the job. Quinn decides to help Cupid so that he will shoot Joe, the photographer, so that he will propose to Quinn (since his engagement with Adriana was canceled).

New mechanics include a budget for each wedding, and the ability to hire Cupid's cherubs for additional help.

=== Wedding Dash 4-Ever (2010) ===
With the wedding between Joe and Quinn off, Quinn is planning the next reception when her mother, Lynn, stops by. She doesn't know that the wedding has been called off, and plans to help Quinn with the planning. Quinn urges Flo to not tell Lynn the truth. The game ends with a surprise by Quinn's father, as he and Lynn renew their vows in an anniversary bonus level. In the end, Joe says he imagines his own wedding with Quinn like this when he sees Quinn's parents walking down the aisle.

In this game, the player also helps with the seating at the wedding ceremony, and leads the after-reception conga line. The player also has to help the newlyweds find things they have misplaced, and in return they will give the player a small token of their gratitude: a wedding present.
