= Diner Dash: Flo on the Go =

2006 video game

- Developer: PlayFirst (Note: Ported to Nintendo DS by Empty Clip Studios. Ported to mobile devices by Glu Mobile.)
- Publishers: PlayFirst; Glu Mobile (mobile); Zoo Games (DS)
- Designer: Chris Bennett
- Artists: Jeff Troupe; Barry Prioste
- Series: Diner Dash
- Engine: Playground SDK
- Platforms: Mac OS X, Windows, Nintendo DS, Java ME, BREW, BlackBerry
- Release: Windows, Mac OS X October 17, 2006; Mobile phone: WW: October 27, 2009; Nintendo DS: NA: October 27, 2009; BlackBerry: WW: 2009
- Genre: Strategy
- Mode: Single-player

Diner Dash: Flo on the Go is the third installment to the game series Diner Dash. It is published by PlayFirst and was released in October 2006.

== Plot ==
Flo and her friend Darla go on a vacation, but while boarding the ship, Flo's suitcase containing her clothes accidentally falls overboard thanks to the ship's crew members leaving in a fit of rage. As the pair eat at the on-board restaurant, a waiter slips, dropping his tray, only for Flo to catch it. Upon learning of how Flo was able to handle that tray, the manager of the ship asks for help from Flo and Darla to work with the ship's crew at the restaurant, promising to refund their tickets in return, as well as pay them for their services. Using the money from this offer, Flo plans to buy herself some new clothes on the on-board store. After working in the ship's restaurant, the pair journey to three other restaurants found onboard a monorail, a submarine, and a blimp. During each visit, Flo constantly loses her clothes, prompting her to buy new ones. Once Flo finishes working in all four restaurants, she and Darla are greeted by the owner of the four restaurants, who is actually the ship's captain. He invites them to work in final restaurant, which is inside a large rocket. Afterwards, the owner allows them to visit the rocket's VIP lounge where they are finally able to get some rest and relaxation.

== Reception ==
Pocket Gamer gave the Java ME version of Flo on the Go an overall score of 8 out of 10, calling it "an addictive and absorbing game" and praised its gameplay and graphics, but criticized some control issues that impeded the game's time-sensitive gameplay.

The Academy of Interactive Arts & Sciences nominated Flo on the Go for "Downloadable Game of the Year" at the 10th Annual Interactive Achievement Awards.

Nintendo World Report gave the Nintendo DS version of Flo on the Go an overall score of 7.5 out of 10, stating that the gameplay is "addictive" and "satisfying", but was critical to its graphics and presentation.

== Sequel ==
Following Flo On The Go, PlayFirst released a Diner Dash spin-off called Wedding Dash. The next official Diner Dash game entitled Diner Dash: Hometown Hero was subsequently released in 2007.
