= Belief & Betrayal =

2006 video game

- Developer(s): Artematica
- Publisher(s): ITA: Artematica; GER: DTP Entertainment; FRA: Micro Application, S.A.; NA/UK: Lighthouse Interactive
- Platform(s): Microsoft Windows
- Release: ITA: November 2006; GER: February 23, 2007; FRA: April 13, 2007; NA/UK: June 20, 2008
- Genre(s): Graphic adventure game

Belief & Betrayal (Italian: Jonathan Danter: Nel Sangue di Giuda) is a graphic adventure video game developed by Artematica.

== Reception ==
Reception

Aggregate score
Aggregator	Score
Metacritic	53/100

Review scores
Publication	Score
4Players	70%
Adventure Gamers	2/5 stars
Eurogamer	4/10
Gamekult	5/10
GameSpot	4.5/10
GameZone	6.5/10
IGN	5.4/10
Jeuxvideo.com	14/20
PC Gamer (US)	54%
PC Zone	35%

The game received "mixed" reviews according to the review aggregation website Metacritic.
