= Time management game =

Video game genre

Time management games are a subgenre of strategy and casual video games focused on fast real-time allocation of resources in a consequent order to fulfill specific game objectives. Games of this type often overlap with tycoon games and other business simulation games, where the player is required to manage a business by acquiring resources and deciding how to use them in a timely fashion. The player often must react to incoming requests that occur as they play and serve them in the most effective manner to get the greatest possible reward. Objectives and reward scenarios are usually time-limited, and the availability of resources limits the speed at which the player can serve the requests. Tapper and Diner Dash are popular games in the genre.

== Description ==
Time management is a subgenre of casual games and strategy video games with a distinct set of features that may lack typical strategy game offerings and tends to appeal more to older women.

Most time-management games don't employ war themes, instead using work themes; the goals of most strategy games are often to conquer a foe, while time management goals are usually to make enough money by doing work in the most effective manner. Unlike strategy games that are often focused on the multiplayer gameplay, time management games are single-player by nature. The art theme is usually friendly, cheerful and simple as it is a common practice in casual games.

== History ==
The 1983 arcade game Tapper is the prototypical time management game, where the player is a bartender who must serve patrons before their patience expires. Later games often feature more tasks, similar to the successful Diner Dash from 2004 that tasked players with restaurant activities from seating customers to washing dishes. Other examples of time management games include Airport Mania, Delicious, and Flight Control.

== Game design ==
=== Gameplay ===
A typical time management game is a progression of levels, each of which sets a goal and a time limit for the player. The goal of a level is typically to complete enough sub-goals within a given time limit. In a level, the player sets priorities (or immediate actions) for actors in order to satisfy appearing sub-goals that can be represented (e.g., as clients who want service or planes that need to land). In some games, consecutive actions may be queued for the actors. The actors will then do the actions in the order set by player with their speed. Usually, if the action is performed too late, a sub-goal is failed.

The frequency of responses by the player increases as the game progresses in difficulty. The player may have the possibility to upgrade their available resources by spending the earned rewards; between the levels, the players would upgrade their actors using game currency earned in the level (e.g., make them move faster, make clients wait longer before failing a sub-goal, serve more clients simultaneously).

=== Settings and themes ===
A typical setting for a time management game puts a player in a position of some kind of service worker (e.g., waiter or cook in a restaurant, airport dispatcher, office manager), though exceptions exist.
