= Daniel Masson (composer) =

French musician

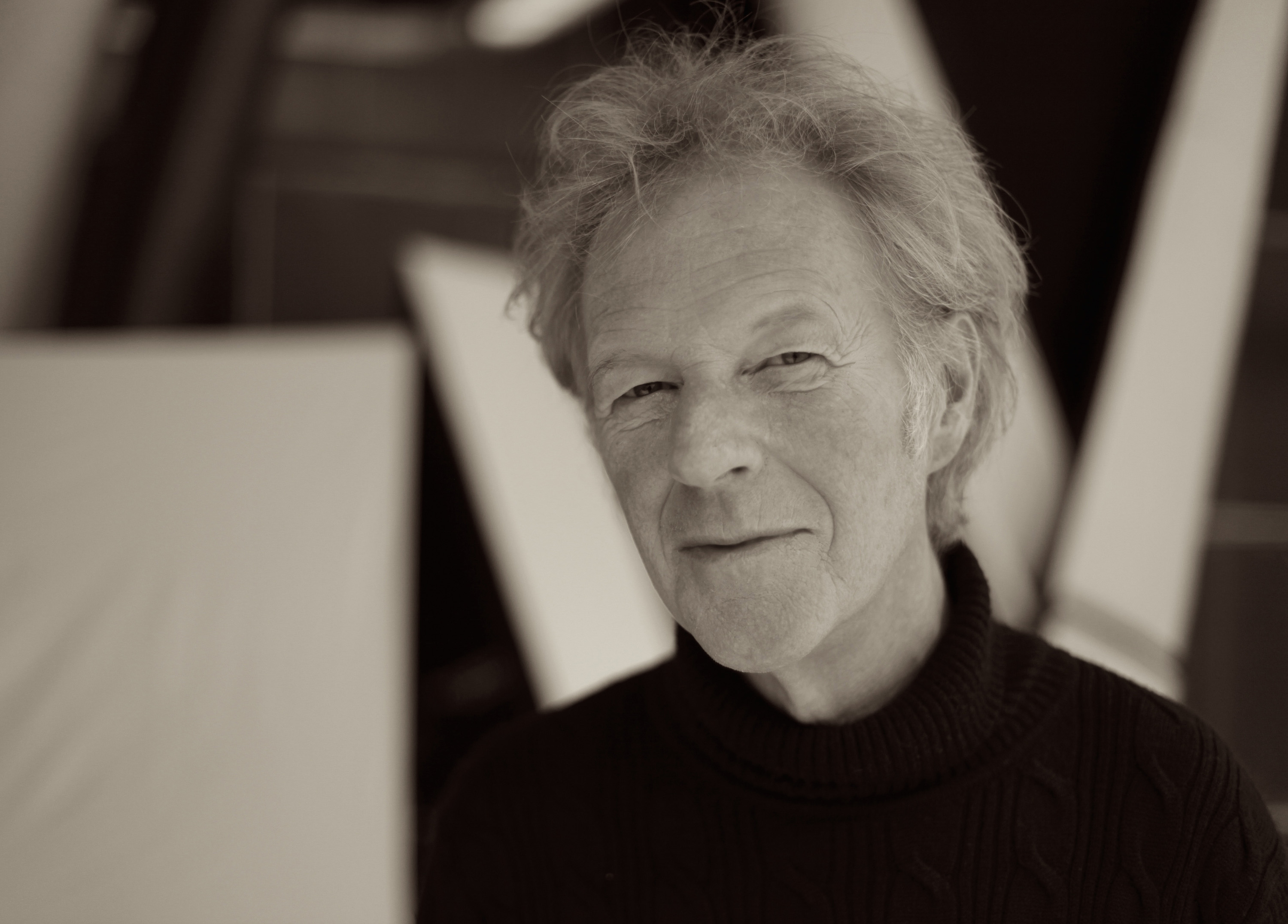

Background information
- Also known as: Baul Dimension, Electromana
- Origin: France
- Genres: Electronic, Ethnic, Deep House, Chillout
- Occupations: Composer; musician; music producer; performer
- Years active: 1976–present
- Website: www.danielmasson.net

Daniel Masson is a self-taught composer, musician, producer and performer. Daniel Masson helped to popularize ethnic deep house chill electronic music with the extraordinary wide-reaching success of the Buddha Bar compilations.

== Biography ==
Daniel's early roots in 70's rock guitar seeded his diverse career from creating video game soundtracks, playing jazz music in Paris, France, and composing electronic music for the restored version of The Impossible Voyage the first silent movie by G. Méliès and a collaboration with Goran Bregovic on the Cannes Film Fest prize winning film Queen Margot.

Masson travels the globe to Bangladesh, Syria, Egypt, Morocco recording musicians, sounds and voices from many cultures and counties to weave together the music of place into adventurous and soothing electronic soundscapes.

In the 2016 film documentary and album Walila, Masson travels to Fés Morocco to merge the ancient with the modern to create a cultural bridge between Western and Arab worlds.

At the invitation of French Institute of Fès: Masson performed at Sacred Music Festival of Fès, Morocco, 2016 edition. His album Walila a new music blending electro beats and sounds with the instruments of Moroccan Traditional Music.

In 2018 Masson released the 3 volumes Trajectories series, inspired by his live mixes experience and continuing the same concept to blend and remix sounds from his library.

In 2019, Masson released Pensées évaporées album, and further in 2020 he released Pacific Dimension E.P.

In 2021, Masson released "Magic Carpet" album following with he released "Dead End" in 2022.

In January 2022, NTS Radio aired an episode dedicated to the music of Daniel Masson.

== Discography ==
=== As Daniel Masson ===
- Dead End (2022) (Daniel Masson)
- Magic Carpet (2021) (Daniel Masson)
- Pacific Dimension - EP (2020), (Daniel Masson)
- Pensées évaporées (2019), (Daniel Masson)
- Trajectories EP Series Vol.1,2,3 (2018), (Daniel Masson)
- Walila EP (2016), (Daniel Masson)
- Jetlag (2015 Edition), (Daniel Masson)
- Ten Particles (2015), (Daniel Masson)
- A Tiny Kick in the Brain (2013), (Daniel Masson)
- Frequencies (2011), (Daniel Masson)
- Adventures (2009), (Daniel Masson)
- Buddha Bar Travel Impressions (2008) (Georges V Records)
- Trempolino EP (2008), (Daniel Masson)
- Bingo EP (2006), (Daniel Masson)
- Baul Dimension (2004), (Daniel Masson)

=== Music for films ===
- The Impossible Voyage of Georges Méliès (Lobster Films, 2011)
- Queen Margot /Patrice Chéreau, 1994
- Mariol Daniel/Kapelian (Exnihilo), 1995
- Tête Creuse (Mac Guff Ligne), 1986
- BBC Documentary "Living the Dream"

=== Video Game Soundtracks ===
- Rayman 3 (GBA) (Ubi Soft Entertainment), 2003
- Tom Clancy’s Splinter Cell (GBA) (Ubi Soft Entertainment), 2003
- PK: Out of the Shadows (Disney Interactive USA/Ubi Soft Entertainment), 2002
- Sabrina, the Teenage Witch: Potion Commotion (Ubi Soft Entertainment), 2002
- Bugmonsters (Montparnasse Multimedia France), 2001
- City Racer (Ubi Soft Bucharest), 2001
- Sethi et le Sorcier Inca (Montparnasse Multimedia France), 2001
- Tristan et le Mystère du Dragon (Montparnasse Multimedia France), 2001
- F1 Racing Championship (Ubi Soft Entertainment), 2000
- The Jungle Book: Mowgli's Wild Adventure (Disney Interactive USA/Ubi Soft Entertainment), 2000
- Donald Duck: Goin' Quackers (PC, Nintendo 64, Dreamcast) (Disney Interactive USA/Ubi Soft Entertainment), 2000
- Start-Up (Monte Cristo Multimedia France), 2000
- Les Mouzz (Emme Interactive France), 2000
- Wall Street Trader 2000 (Monte Cristo Multimedia), 1999
- Rayman 2: The Great Escape (Nintendo 64) (Ubi Soft Entertainment), 1999
- Kitchenette (Le Lab France), 1998
- Les 3 Petits Cochons (Dramaera France), 1998
- Monaco Grand Prix (Ubi Soft Entertainment), 1998
- Rayman Activity Centre (Ubi Soft Entertainment), 1998
- Rayman Dictées (Ubi Soft Entertainment), 1998
- Tim7 (Ubi Soft Entertainment), 1998
- Rayman Junior (Ubi Soft Entertainment), 1997
- Sean Dundee’s World Club Football (Ubi Soft Entertainment), 1997
- F1 Racing Simulation (Ubi Soft Entertainment), 1997
- Les 9 Destins de Valdo (Ubi Soft Entertainment), 1997
- POD: Planet of Death (Ubi Soft Entertainment), 1997
- 1,2,3 Musique (Ubi Soft Entertainment), 1996
- Genesia (Microids), 1993

=== Pacific Islands Collection ===
- Bora Bora (Océania Records/ Pony Canyon INC.Japan), 2002
- Tonga (Océania Records/ Pony Canyon INC.Japan), 2002
- Tahiti (Océania Records/ Pony Canyon INC.Japan), 2002
- Vanuatu (Océania Records/ Pony Canyon INC.Japan), 2002
- Papouasie Nouvelle Guinée (Océania Records/ Pony Canyon INC.Japan), 2002
- Loyalty Islands (Océania Records/ Pony Canyon INC.Japan), 2002
- Hawaii (Océania Records/ Pony Canyon INC.Japan), 2002
- Les Marquises (Océania Records/ Pony Canyon INC.Japan), 2002
- The Solomon Islands (Océania Records/ Pony Canyon INC.Japan), 2002

=== As Daniel Masson (Baul Dimension) ===
==== Buddha Bar Compilation ====
- Buddha Bar Greatest Hits (George V Records) 2019
- Buddha Bar Meets French Kitchen & Friends (George V Records), 2018
- Buddha Bar Ultimate Expérience (George V Records), 2016
- A Night @ Buddha-Bar Hotel (George V Records), 2011
- Universal Sound Of Buddha Bar Vol.3 (George V Records), 2009
- Buddha Bar Océan (George V Records), 2008
- Buddha Bar Book (George V Records), 2008
- Buddha Bar Ten Years (George V Records), 2006
- Buddha Bar VI (George V Records), 2004
- Siddharta Spirit Of Buddha Bar vol.2 (George V Records), 2003
- Little Buddha Café (George V Records), 2001

==== Various Labels Compilations ====
- Oriental Soul (Compiled by DJ Brahms) - (Cafe De Anatolia) 2020
- Oriental Trip, Vol.3 (Compiled by DJ Brahms)- (Cafe De Anatolia) 2019
- Café Buddha Box Set - Classic Buddha (Park Lane Recordings), 2009
- Tea House 2 (HighNote Records), 2008
- Hotel Buddha (Crazy Diamond Recording), 2007
- Hangzhou China (HighNote Records), 2006
- Purobeach Vol.2 (Seamless), 2006
- Week-End In Ibiza (Water Music Records), 2006
- Lounge Cafe DeLuxe (Park Lane Recordings), 2006
- Dâ-Nang (Quango Music Group), 2005
- Taipei Lounge 2 (HighNote Records), 2005
- Café Solaire (Soulstar), 2005
- Café Nirvana (Park Lane Recordings), 2005
- Cassagrande Ethnica Vol 3 (Métropole Records), 2004
- Jogoya (HighNote Records), 2004
- The Sound Of Milano Fashion 3 (Cool D vision), 2004
- Travel Electro (Atoll Music), 2004
- Buddha-Bar, 2004
- Various Artists Leafage Music (Pony Canyon INC. Japan), 2003
- Wenk (Universal Music), 2003
- Together Barra Mundi 4 (Pchent), 2003
- World Habitat (Habitat), 2003
- Voyage Océanie (Naïve), 2003
- Couleurs Pacifique (Vox Terrae), 2003
- Moana Lounge (Intercontinental Beachcomber Resorts), 2003
- Sunny Days (MCD World Music), 2003
- Lazy Afternoons (MCD World Music), 2003
- Cool Nights (MCD World Music), 2003
- Undiscovered World 2 (V2), 2003
- The Karma Collection « Sunrise » (Ministry of Sound), 2002
- Nights In French Satin Vol.2 (HighNote Records), 2002
- Chilled Grooves (Water Music Records), 2002
- Cargo High-Tech (Energy Production Srl), 2002
- Oceanic Fringe (Times Music), 2002
- Paradise (Adequat Music), 2002
- Café del Sol vol.3 (Water Music Records), 2002
- Café Ibiza (Water Music Records), 2002
- Pacific Hotel (Oceania Records), 2002
- Casssagrande Ethnica (Métropole Records), 2002
- In Bloom II A Collection of World Music Produced in France (Bureau Export), 2002
- French Music Popkomm 2001 Koln (Bureau Export De La Musique Française), 2001
- Paradisiac ( Universal Music), 2000
- In Bloom A Collection of French Electronica (Bureau Export), 2000

=== As Electromana ===
- Electromana-Fashion For Developpement (Pony Canyon Inc. Japan), 2003
- Electromana-Jetlag (Georges V Records), 2001

=== With Others ===
- Atlantean (Atlantis Recordings), 2006
- Sara Mandiano (WEA Music), 1993
- Philippe Russo (EMI France), 1988
- Jungle Boys (EMI France), 1987

== Remixes ==
- Angelic Voices, B-Tribe on Buddha Bar vol 6 (Georges V Records), 2004
- Breeze, Ratnabali on Siddharta vol 2 (Georges V Records), 2003

== Live Mixes ==
- G. Melies Impossible Voyage at Busan International Film Festival, South Korea, 2017
- Pareidolia Coco Tulum Live Mix, 2017
- Geneva Yoga Music Festival Live Mix, 2017
- London Troubadour Live Mix, 2016 and 2017
- Walila Live at Sacred Music Festival of Fès, 2016
- Geneva Yoga Music Festival in 2012 and 2013

== TV and Commercials ==
- Elastok//French TV La Cinq
- Air France
- Darphin Cosmetics
- Swissair
- Chopard Watches
- Roger & Gallet Cosmetics
- Graal Joaillier
