= Arnab Basu =

American game designer

Arnab Basu is a product manager, game designer and a videogames producer. He has contributed to the Tomb Raider series for Crystal Dynamics on Tomb Raider: Anniversary and Tomb Raider: Underworld. And later, at Eidos Interactive for Batman: Arkham Asylum.

Arnab is a secretary on the Board of Directors for the Institute of Play, a not-for-profit which promotes game design as a non-traditional education tool. His focus has been enhancing primary education for kids around the world by harnessing new media and game design techniques to build flexible, on-demand learning ecologies. He has given talks on game design at the Game Design Expo, Vancouver Film School, Vancouver' 2008 and the Game Developers Conference, Lyon, 2007

Basu graduated with an MET degree from the Entertainment Technology Center at Carnegie Mellon in 2006. He holds a BE in Computer Science and Engineering from Visvesvaraya Technological University
