= Gamelab =

Game studio

- Type: Private
- Industry: Video games
- Founded: 2000
- Founder: Eric Zimmerman; Peter Seung-Taek Lee
- Defunct: 2009 (assets acquired by Arkadium)
- Key people: Eric Zimmerman (co-founder, chief executive); Peter Seung-Taek Lee (co-founder, president); Frank Lantz (director of game design); Nicholas Fortugno (director of game design); Katie Salen
- Number of employees: 40

Gamelab was an independent game studio in New York City, New York founded by game designer Eric Zimmerman and Peter Seung-Taek Lee in 2000. It is best known for creating Diner Dash, one of the most downloaded games of all time (over half a billion times across multiple platforms in its first six years), as well as its two spin-off companies, the non-profit Institute of Play and the online game and community site Gamestar Mechanic.

== History ==
Zimmerman and Lee (with audio by Michael Sweet) created a game called BLiX, which was named a Finalist (and eventually won Best Audio) at the 2000 Independent Games Festival at the Game Developers Conference, Zimmerman and Lee then incorporated gameLab and used an advance on BLiX royalties from their exclusivity deal with Shockwave.com to open an office in downtown Manhattan. gameLab released 34 video games on multiple platforms between 2000 and 2009, published by companies like LEGO, HBO, PlayFirst, VH-1, and iWin, plus eight massively multiplayer social games created exclusively for and played at the yearly Game Developers Conference from 2001 to 2008.

In 2004, gameLab released the award-winning Diner Dash, a strategy and time management game published by PlayFirst, then-director of game design Frank Lantz and students in his Big Games class (including gameLab employees Greg Trefry and Mattia Romeo) at New York University's Interactive Telecommunications Program created Pac-Manhattan, a real life version of Pac-Man played in the streets surrounding NYU, which was one of the earliest and most influential pervasive games, covered by The New York Times and receiving worldwide press. In 2005, gameLab employees Trefry, Romeo, Nicholas Fortugno, and Catherine Herdlick plus co-founder Lee co-founded Come Out & Play, an annual festival of new original big games played in the streets of New York City, Lantz left to co-found the game studio area/code, which was acquired by Zynga in 2011 and became Zynga New York, and is now the director of New York University's Game Center.

In 2007, gameLab spun off the non-profit Institute of Play to promote game design and play as educational tools for students. Within six months of its founding, Institute of Play received a grant from the John D. and Catherine T. MacArthur Foundation to develop Quest to Learn, a New York City public school designed around game design principles. In 2009, supported by another grant from the John D. and Catherine T. MacArthur Foundation, gameLab partnered with Katie Salen and released the award-winning game and community site Gamestar Mechanic. gameLab closed in 2009 and sold its assets to Arkadium.

== Video games ==
Year	Title	Type	Publisher/Financer
2000	BLiX	web	gameLab
2001	FLUID	touchscreen installation	Swiss Re Center for Global Dialog
2001	Junkbot	web	LEGO
2001	LEGO Stack-It	web	LEGO
2001	LOOP	web	Shockwave.com
2002	BLiX Level Constructor Kit	web	gameLab
2002	Drome Racing Challenge	web	LEGO
2002	Junkbot Undercover	web	LEGO
2002	LEGO World Builder	web	LEGO
2002	Spybotics: The Nightfall Incident	web	LEGO
2003	Arcadia	PC/web	gameLab
2003	Crash	web	gameLab
2003	FATE: The Carnivale Game	web	HBO
2003	LEGO Inventor	web	LEGO
2003	LEGO World Builder 2	web	LEGO
2003	Motobike Blast	web	LEGO
2004	LEGO X-Pod Playoff	board game	LEGO
2004	Mighty Beanz Trading Card Game	collectible card game	Genio
2004	Subway Scramble	PC/web	PlayFirst
2005	Arcadia Remix	PC/web	gameLab
2005	Diner Dash	PC/web	PlayFirst
2005	LEGO X-Pod Playoff 2	board game	LEGO
2005	Shopmania	PC/web	iWin
2006	Ayiti: The Cost of Life	web	gameLab/Global Kids
2006	Downbeat	web	VH-1
2006	Egg vs Chicken	PC/web	PlayFirst
2006	LEGO Fever	PC/web	LEGO
2006	Miss Management	PC/web	gameLab
2006	Plantasia	PC/web	PlayFirst
2007	Jojo's Fashion Show	PC/web	iWin
2007	Out of Your Mind	PC/web	gameLab/Curious Pictures
2008	Jojo's Fashion Show 2: Las Cruces	PC/web	iWin
2008	Top Chef	PC/web	Brighter Minds Media
2009	Gamestar Mechanic	web	gameLab

== Massively Multiplayer Social Games at GDC ==
Year	Title
2002	Bite Me
2002	Leviathan
2003	Alphabet City
2004	Supercollider
2005	ConfQuest
2006	Pantheon
2007	Gangs of GDC
2008	Destroy All Developers
