= Diabolik: The Original Sin =

2009 video game

- European cover art
- Developer: Artematica
- Publisher: Black Bean Games
- Producer: Massimiliano Calamai
- Designer: Marco Ponte
- Artist: Daniele Montella
- Writers: Massimiliano Calamai; Massimo Casagrande; Marco Ponte; Riccardo Cangini
- Composer: Andrea Vialardi
- Platforms: PlayStation 2, Microsoft Windows, PlayStation Portable, Wii, Nintendo DS
- Release: PAL: 26 June 2009
- Genre: Adventure
- Mode: Single-player

Diabolik: The Original Sin is a 2009 adventure game developed by Italian studio Artematica Entertainment and published by Black Bean Games in 2009 for PlayStation 2, Wii, Windows, Nintendo DS and PSP. It is based on the Italian comic book series Diabolik.

== Plot and gameplay ==
The game is based on the Italian comic book character Diabolik. When his girlfriend is held captive he is forced to steal a valuable work of art. The game has a standard point-and-click interface, with some action elements. A proprietary engine driving the game and a system of dynamic dialogs was created.

== Production ==
The game was first announced on 1 December 2005 and the first screenshots were revealed on 9 November 2006. Originally called Diabolik: Evil's Origin, it was later renamed to its current title.

Riccardo Cangini of Artematica said: "We are enthusiastic about being able to work on such a powerful character as Diabolik...we wish to carry out a game of profound impact and high quality". The creators wanted to "skillfully combine three-dimensional locations with the point & click interface, spatial models of characters and cartoon scenes".

Micro Application organised the game's distribution and localization in French on 12 June. Akella had the rights to publish within Russia and other CIS countries. Black Bean Games and Koch Media published it into Spanish.

In 2008, Black Bean acquired worldwide publishing rights to the console versions of the game.

== Reception ==
Game Boomers felt that while the game was not award-worthy, it was enjoyable to see the character in a video game. Adventures Planet thought the stylistic point of view was one of the game's merits. Adventure Gamers gave praise to the suspenseful atmosphere. Adventure Classic Gaming felt that the game was competent without being particular impactful. Jeuxvideo thought that the game's plot was conventional, though still effective, that the game contained uninteresting puzzles and mini-games, and that the background music was pleasing.

Gamekult thought the game was too linear and scripted. Multiplayer.it felt it was a successful debut into the video gaming world for the character. Stop Game wrote that the plot, graphics, voice, puzzles were equally awful. Eurogamer felt that the game was ultimately unbalanced. 3D Juegos thought the game played as very slow. Vandal asserted that the game's character design emulated the comic book series. Igromania liked that the game copied the style of the work it was based on.
