= Double Kick Heroes =

2020 video game

- Developer: Headbang Club
- Publishers: Headbang Club, Hound Picked Games, WhisperGames, Kakehashi
- Composer: Elmobo
- Platforms: Windows; MacOS; Nintendo Switch; Xbox One
- Release: August 13, 2020: PC, Switch; August 13, 2020; Xbox One; August 28, 2020
- Genres: Rhythm game, Shoot 'em up
- Mode: Single-player

Double Kick Heroes is a video game developed by Headbang Club, which combines rhythm game and shoot 'em up mechanics. It was released for multiple platforms in August 2020.

== Gameplay ==
Double Kick Heroes is a 2D side-scrolling video game with rhythm gameplay that features up to three musical instruments. Its story follows a band of heavy metal musicians who travel around a post-apocalyptic monster infested world in a Cadillac automobile. Players must repel pursuing enemies through shoot 'em up mechanics which is intertwined with the game's double kick drumbeat: this involve pressing buttons on a controller or a keyboard, timed to the beat of a music track, in order to trigger firearm weapons which are strapped to the musicians' instruments, with different notes powering up different weapons. Players may maneuver the car to evade obstacles, or launch grenades to deal area of effect damage to enemies. Enemies encountered by players include zombies, mutant soldiers, anthropomorphic sharks, dinosaurs, and Mad Max-style road gangs. Each level in Double Kick Heroes takes the form of a highway which lasts exactly as long as the featured track. Double Kick Heroes features up to 30-tracks composed by musician Elmobo at launch, in addition to nine guest tracks from other games and bands. Alternatively, players may customize levels using a complimentary level editor by importing music into the game, or compose and design note-charts for levels from scratch.

== Development ==
Double Kick Heroes is developed by French studio Headbang Club. It was first conceived in December 2015 for the 34th Ludum Dare game jam, an online event where games are made from scratch in a weekend. The game's original version had limited features: gameplay was based around the concept of alternating two-button controls and the sole featured musical instrument were drums, with players using both left and right arrow keys on the keyboard to simulate high tempo percussion and generate a machine gun bullet that accompanies each note hit to attack a growing swarm of zombies. Double Kick Heroes was later developed as a commercial video game, with an early access version released through Steam Early Access in April 2019. This version allows players to use up to four buttons for the percussion arsenal mechanic, and another two to maneuver the car. Headbang Club released regular update for the game as part of its early access period; for example, the July 2019 "Going Rogue" update adds a roguelike survival mode called Fury Road where players can add modifiers to a level's gameplay. Another alternate game mode named the "Chill Mode" removes pursuing monsters and allows players to experience a level in the style of a conventional rhythm game without combat mechanics.

The full version of Double Kick Heroes launched on August 13, 2020, for the Nintendo Switch and PC platforms via Steam. Versions for the Xbox One and PC via the Microsoft Store and Xbox Game Pass for PC were released on August 28, 2020. Hound Picked Games serves as co-publisher and helped produce a physical edition for the Nintendo Switch.

== Reception ==
Reception

Aggregate score
Aggregator	Score
Metacritic	(PC) 73/100 (NS) 74/100 (XONE) 72/100

In an April 2018 article written for Rock, Paper, Shotgun which previewed the game's early access build, Dominic Tarason found Double Kick Heroes "surprisingly demanding", particularly with the way he had to multitask between "juggling multiple audio tracks", with each tied to a different weapon, while at the same time keeping an eye on the gameplay screen itself for enemies to target and attacks to steer away from.

According to the review aggregator Metacritic, Double Kick Heroes received average or mixed reviews following its 2020 multi-platform release.
