= The Improv Presents: Don't Quit Your Day Job =

1996 video game

- Windows cover art
- Platforms: Windows, Macintosh
- Release: 1996
- Genre: Adventure

The Improv Presents: Don't Quit Your Day Job is a 1996 adventure game developed by Philips Interactive Media, Inc. and published by Improvisation ManyMedia.

== Plot ==
The game sees the player, an agent, try to book an up-and-coming comedian for the late-night Johnnie K. Show. They enter the improv club 'The Improv' to interact with the local patrons to try to book a client. It has a point-and-click interface. If the player makes an error, they are transported to the 'Curse of the CD ROM Hallways' where they must complete a minigame before returning to the action.

The game was made using QuickTime, has a point and click interface, and contains 360 degree rotatable motion on each screen.

GameRevolution deemed it a "well-intentioned but utterly hopeless comic romp". Coming Soon Magazine suggested that while the game would suit a stand up aficionado, it lacked enough interactivity to be a serviceable adventure game.
