= Dream Match Tennis =

2006 video game

- Developer: Bimboosoft Co. Ltd
- Platform: Microsoft Windows
- Release: 2006
- Genre: Sports game
- Modes: Single-player, multiplayer

Dream Match Tennis is a 2006 tennis simulation game developed by Bimboosoft, a company based in Saitama, Japan. Unlike other games in its genre, Dream Match Tennis was aimed to produce a more realistic depiction of the sport, requiring more skill from the player in order to direct their shots accurately.

Due to the small size of the Bimboosoft Company, they were not able to use the same level of graphical effects for the game as other companies such as Sega could with like Virtua Tennis 3.

This page refers to the "Pro" version of the game: v. 2.37 is the latest demo version. During the year 2021 it was released by Bimboosoft as free full version (v. 3.00).

== Playing the game ==
There are 5 different kinds of shots in Dream Match Tennis:

Normal Shot (also hits a 'normal speed' serve, usually used as a second serve)

Hard Shot (also hits a 'hard' serve, usually used as a first serve)

Slice Shot (also hits a 'slice' serve, usually used as a first serve)

Lob

Drop Shot

A Super-Hard Shot has also been recently added, which is harder than the hard shot, but with the added risk of the shot going long or into the net.

The normal shot has been criticized for some of the characters, as it is so weak for the likes of Mason that a hard shot must be used the entire time, negating the use of the normal shot.

Unlike most tennis games, Dream Match Tennis is controlled primarily through the use of timing rather than simply the directional buttons. If a player wants to hit a cross-court shot, they have to hit the ball slightly early. If they want to hit the ball in the opposite direction, they have to hit it slightly later (i.e., when it's going behind the player's character). The directional buttons can be used to get extra angle or direction; for instance, the downwards directional button makes the ball go short, and is useful for hitting angled cross-court shots.

Serving is also performed via correct timing - each character has a unique serving motion, and the shot button must be pressed at the correct moment in order for the ball to go into the court. The moment that the shot button must be pressed varies depending on what kind of serve is being hit, and at what pace the serve is being hit at (pressing the upwards button makes the serve more powerful, whereas pressing the downwards button makes it travel more slowly). The serve is noticeably more effective in Dream Match Tennis than in other tennis games, and the characters with the more powerful serves are capable of hitting up to 14 aces per set (depending on the quality of the opponent).

== Players ==
The number of playable characters has risen to 13 (only one female among them) since the release of the game, each with their own strengths and weaknesses. All of the characters are based on real players, with their names altered in order to avoid licensing issues:

R. Ford (based on Roger Federer) – considered to be one of the best characters in the game, Ford has powerful groundshots with much spin, is capable of serving at up to 128 mph (his serve speed has been reduced from earlier versions), is quick around the court and is also good at volleying. Ford has been weakened in the last few versions of the game due to balancing issues.

R. Nelson (based on Rafael Nadal) – along with Ford is thought of as one of the strongest characters, with a powerful forehand that can generate extreme angles, a strong backhand and good speed around the court. The strength of Nelson's serve is somewhat of an issue with some players of the game, as it is considered too effective when compared to Nadal's serve in reality.

P. Scott (based on Pete Sampras) – slightly weaker than Ford and Nelson, Scott nevertheless has a very powerful serve (he is capable of serving up to 135 mph), a powerful forehand and solid backhand, with good volleys.

A. Arnold (based on Andre Agassi) – a strong baseline player, Arnold is capable of hitting winners from either his forehand or backhand very easily, but this is offset by his poor volleys and relatively ineffective serve.

S. Evans (based on Stefan Edberg) – rarely used in multiplayer matches, this player has an accurate serve, very good volleys and a powerful backhand, but his weak forehand and slowness around the court make it difficult to compete with the better characters when using him.

B. Baron (based on Boris Becker) – has a powerful serve that is easy to time (around the same speed as Ford), but is fairly lumbering around the court with only average groundshots.

A. Richmond (based on Andy Roddick) – a player characterized by a powerful serve and forehand, with weaker backhand and volleying attributes and relatively low movement speed. His serve can reach up to 150 mph.

I. Leach (based on Ivan Lendl) – a powerful baseline player, his forehand is one of the strongest in the game, but tough to control when using super hard shots and his backhand is also very strong. However, he is also slow and his serve, while being quite powerful, is hard to aim accurately.

M. Cooper (based on Michael Chang) – extremely quick around the court, with an average forehand and a good backhand, and a serve that is difficult to time.

J. Mason (based on John McEnroe) – this character has very weak groundshots, and a serve that, while also lacking power, is capable of getting aces due to the amount of spin on it. He is also quick around the court, with good volleys. J. Mason is the only character available to use online in the free demo of the game, and is consequently used frequently in multiplayer matches. This has become an annoyance with some players who have purchased the game, because Mason is unable to maintain a rally with some of the more hard hitting players such as Ford or Nelson.

S. Gibson (based on Steffi Graf) – the only female character in the game, she is virtually never used in an online match because each one of her shots is among the worst performing in the game.

J. Cain (based on Jimmy Connors) – Cain has a very weak serve (only capable of reaching just over 100 mph), but his groundshots are powerful and he is able to easily hit winners. However, the fact that they do not have much spin means they often go in the net when going for angled shots. His volleys are also among the worst performing in the game.

B. Banks (based on Björn Borg) – Banks is somewhat of a jack-of-all-trades, with average power on each of his shots and middling speed around the court.

The characters most often used in online games are Ford, Nelson, Richmond and Arnold.

== Game modes ==
Exhibition – this is where a match (either singles or doubles) can be played between any two characters. This can either be a human against the computer, of which there are a number of different difficulties (with 'beginner' being the easiest, and 'insane' being the hardest), or a human against another human (either using a gamepad, or online). Doubles matches cannot be played online yet.

Challenge – this is a single-player mode, where a player using any character has to beat 4 randomly chosen characters on each of the 4 Grand Slam surfaces. Unlike 'exhibition' mode, the computer difficulty only ranges from beginner to pro, with no insane level.

World Tour – the player chooses a character and has to play in a number of events around the world against computer controlled opponents, trying to reach the ranking of world number 1.

Practice – this is where a player can practice any kind of shot with any character.
