= Quest to Learn =

Public school in New York City

Location
- 351 West 18th Street; Manhattan, New York City 10011; United States
- 40°44′36″N 74°00′10″W

Information
- School type: Public secondary
- Established: 2009
- School district: New York City Department of Education
- School number: M422
- CEEB code: 333894
- Principal: Marina Galazidis
- Grades: 6-12
- Enrollment: 591
- Colors: Orange and blue
- Mascot: Titan
- Nickname: Quest or Q2L
- Team name: Titans
- Website: www.q2l.org

Quest to Learn (Q2L) is a public middle and high school in New York City. The school is operated by the New York City Department of Education and is located in the Bayard Rustin Educational Complex in the Chelsea neighborhood of Manhattan.

== History ==
The creation of the school was a collaboration between the Institute of Play and the New York City Department of Education, with backing from the MacArthur Foundation and support from New Visions for Public Schools. The school began in the 2009–2010 school year with one sixth grade class, and added a new grade every year until 2015 when it became a fully functioning combined middle and high school encompassing grades 6-12. Game designer and educator Katie Salen was one of the chief designers of the school.

== Curriculum ==
Q2L's standards-based curriculum is developed collaboratively by teachers, game designers, and curriculum designers. Curriculum design mimics the design principles of games by framing every piece of the curriculum as a mission that involves game strategies such as collaboration, role-playing, and simulation. The school encourages hands-on problem solving, and is designed to promote learning of skills many experts say are necessary for college and career success, such as systems thinking, collaboration, and digital literacy. Not only do students play games in the classrooms, they learn to make them in order to demonstrate their systems thinking skills.

Quest to Learn emphasizes "7 Principles of Game-Based Learning":

- "Everyone is a participant",
- "Challenge is constant",
- "Learning happens by doing",
- "Feedback is immediate and ongoing",
- "Failure is reframed as “iteration”,
- "Everything is interconnected", and
- "It kind of feels like play".

== Students ==
Quest To Learn looks to engage their students through a unique learning style which incorporates games, hands-on activities, and collaborative activities. The student body is very diverse, with students having numerous cultural and ethnic backgrounds.

According to Brian Waniewski, the Managing Director of the Institute of Play in 2012, Quest to Learn's students "are performing at or above New York City-wide averages on standardized tests. In the first 20 months of the school’s operation, students showed statistically significant gains in systems thinking skills, according to a study from Florida State University.

== Notable alumni ==
- Ronan Day-Lewis
