= Domino Master =

2004 video game

- Developer(s): TikGames
- Publisher(s): Windows: TikGames, Real; Xbox 360: Microsoft Game Studios
- Platform(s): Windows, Xbox 360
- Release: Windows: 2004; Xbox 360: NA: September 17, 2008
- Genre(s): Casual game
- Mode(s): Single-player, multiplayer

Domino Master is a casual game based on dominos for Windows and Xbox 360 developed by TikGames and published by Microsoft Game Studios. Domino Master was originally released for Windows 98 in 2004 by TikGames and later released on Xbox Live Arcade on September 17, 2008 .

The game is available from TikGames for Windows as Domino Master Gold.

== Gameplay ==
Xbox 360 screenshot.

- Variable difficulty levels: The single player mode features three levels of difficulty for the A.I. players, including Beginner, Master, and Guru, to provide exciting gameplay for all ages.
- Five game modes: Play Straight, All 3's, All 5's, Bergen, or Mexican Train.
- Leaderboard support: See your name in lights as you check the leaderboards for each game type.
- Multiplayer modes: Play Player Match or Ranked Matches. The ultimate party game comes to life when up to four players compete to see who can become the Domino Master.
- Custom rules: Modify the rules to create your own personal dominos game.
- Multiple domino sets: Choose from double sixes, double nines, or double twelve domino sets.

== Reception ==
- Casual Gamer Chick review (XBLA)
