= Artematica =

Italian software developer

Artematica Entertainment
- Type: Private
- Industry: Interactive entertainment
- Founded: 1996
- Founder: Riccardo Cangini
- Headquarters: Chiavari, Genoa, Italy
- Key people: Riccardo Cangini (CEO)
- Products: Video games, mobile games, advergames, ITV games (only in the 90s)
- Website: artematica.com

Artematica Entertainment is an Italian developer of software, especially video games, established in the comune of Chiavari, near Genoa. The company develops on the platforms: Android, Apple's iOS, Facebook, Mobile phones, PC, Sony (PlayStation 2, PlayStation 3, and PSP), Nintendo (DS, and Wii), and Web.

Founded in 1996 by Riccardo Cangini, Artematica produces and develops multi-platform video games for training well-differentiated, often based on international licenses, and mainly focused in the genre of adventure games.

The company's games are published worldwide by partners such as 505 Games, Akella, Black Bean Games, Codemasters, DreamCatcher Interactive, DTP-AG, Halifax, Leader, Lighthouse Interactive, Micro Application, Strategy First, Ubisoft, and Warner Bros. Interactive Entertainment.

== Games developed ==
=== Official titles ===
#	Title	Alternative title	Release year	Genre	Platform(s)
1	Druuna: Morbus Gravis		2001	Graphic adventure	PC
2	Combat Blade		2004	Fighting	PC
3	Gustavo Zito: I Play 3D Billiards		2004	Sport	PC
4	Martin Mystère: Operation Dorian Gray	Crime Stories: From the Files of Martin Mystère	2004	Graphic adventure	PC
5	Totò Taste	Totò Sapore e la magica storia della pizza	2004	Adventure	PC
6	Mad Checkmate	Pazzo Scaccomatto	2005	Casual game	PC
7	Belief & Betrayal	Jonathan Danter: Nel sangue di Giuda	2006	Graphic adventure	PC
8	Ducati World Championship		2006	Racing	PC
9	Sudoku		2006	Casual game	PC
10	Up Soccer		2006	Sport	PC
11	The Crystals of Avalon	I cristalli di Avalon	2007	Graphic adventure	Web
12	Diabolik: The Original Sin		2007	Graphic adventure	Nintendo DS, Nintendo Wii, PC, PlayStation 2, PSP
13	R.I.S.: Crimes Imperfect	R.I.S. - Delitti imperfetti	2008	Graphic adventure	PC
14	Subbuteo		2008	Sport	Nintendo DS
15	Ico Soccer		2009	Sport	Nintendo DS
16	Cardstown		2010	Casual game	Facebook
17	Circus		2010	Party game	Nintendo Wii
18	Julia: Innocent Eyes		2010	Graphic adventure	PC
19	Spaghetti Western Shooter		2010	Shooter	iOS. Note: The Wii version was released in 2011, while the Facebook version in 2013.
20	MessengerPoker		2011	Casual game	iOS, Facebook
21	Fantacalcioville		2012	Sport	Facebook
22	Feed the Hippo		2012	Puzzle	iOS
23	Fruits Crush		2012	Puzzle	iOS
24	Real Challenge Football		2012	Sport	Facebook
25	Diabolik Gems		2013	Puzzle	Android, iOS

=== Advergames ===
- 500 Twin Air: The Face Race
- Challenge Juventus (a.k.a. Sfida la Juventus)
- Coconut Game (a.k.a. Cocco Game)
- Cyber Top
- Formula 1 TIM
- Lola Game
- Monster Allergy (a.k.a. Monster Allergy: Il domatore di mostri)
- Monster Hotel
- Monsters & Pirates (a.k.a. Mostri & Pirati)
- Nutella Football Game
- The Pallastrike on Easter Island (a.k.a. La Pallastrike sull'Isola di Pasqua)
- Pully the Game
- The Straspeed (a.k.a. Gli Straspeed a Crazy World)
- The Skatenini (a.k.a. Gli Skatenini e le dune dorate)
- Winx Club
- Working Like a Machine

=== Kids (playground) games ===
- Alice in Wonderland
- Pinocchio
- Robin Hood
- Sandokan
- Tommy & Oscar (a.k.a. Tommy & Oscar: Il canto del cristallo)
- Tony Wolf: The Wood (a.k.a. Tony Wolf – Il Bosco)
- Tony Wolf: Gnomes (a.k.a. Tony Wolf – Gnomi)
- Twenty Thousand Leagues Under the Sea

=== ITV games ===
- TV show - Tickle [a.k.a. Solletico] (Rai 1):
  - "Basket Mio"
  - "Il gioco delle bolle"
  - "Redazione Misteri"
  - "Time Wings"
