= Ducati World Championship =

2006 video game

- European cover art
- Developer: Artematica
- Publishers: IT: Ubisoft; UK: Lexicon Entertainment; NA: Strategy First
- Platform: Windows
- Release: IT: September 14, 2006; UK: November 10, 2006; NA: September 18, 2007
- Genre: Racing
- Modes: Single-player, multiplayer

Ducati World Championship is a 2006 racing video game developed by Artematica for Windows.

== Gameplay ==
Ducati World Championship is a game about motorcycle racing. The game features over 70 bikes by Ducati in four different classes and 34 courses. The game has five game modes: quick race, career, championship, Capirex challenge and multiplayer. Capirex challenge requires the player to do stunts like wheelies. The game features time-of-day and weather systems. The camera system has first and third-person perspectives. The multiplayer mode allows racing by two people in a split-screen format. There is no internet or network playmode.

== Reception ==
Reception

Aggregate score
Aggregator	Score
GameRankings	42%

Review scores
Publication	Score
4Players	35/100
GameStar	71%
GameZone	6.8/10
IGN	3.0/10
Click!	3/5+
Giochi per il mio computer	4.5/10
Motorcycle.com	5.25/10
Multiplayer.it	7/10
PC Action	66%

Games for Windows: The Official Magazine wrote: "The game's menu system is clunky and aurally abrasive, its environments are sparse and indistinct, and its physics model is so absurdly archaic that you'll pine for the decrepit coin-op racers down at the local bowl-o-rama." Italian GameStar didn't like the bike controls and also stated that the keyboard setup leads to discomfort and expressed confusion over the absence of mouse or analog control options. Strana Igr said the gameplay is too arcadey and graphics unsightly. They compared the game negatively to Super-Bikes Riding Challenge and MotoGP: Ultimate Racing Technology 3. IGN said the graphics are worse than in Superbike 2000 and MotoGP '07.
