= Driftmoon =

2013 video game

- Developer: Instant Kingdom
- Designers: Ville Mönkkönen; Anne Mönkkönen
- Programmer: Ville Mönkkönen
- Artists: Ville Mönkkönen; Johanna Sundström
- Composer: Gareth Meek
- Platforms: Windows, Linux, Mac
- Release: WW: February 26, 2013
- Genre: Role-playing
- Mode: Single-player

Driftmoon is a role-playing video game developed and published by Instant Kingdom, a Finnish video game developer. It was released in 2013 for Microsoft Windows, Linux, and Mac OS. In Driftmoon, players explore fantasy open-world. There is a non-linear story, allowing players to explore and make choices that affect the outcome of the game. It received generally positive reviews.

== Plot ==
The beautiful, enchanted world of Driftmoon trembles in the shadow of a forgotten evil, for the dark King Ixal is once again gathering his forces.

Hope lies in an unlikely alliance—the player's character joins forces with a little firefly dreaming of stardom, a panther queen with the ego of a moon whale, and a very determined fellow who has lost everything except his bones. This group embarks on a journey to defeat King Ixal.

== Reception ==
Reception

Aggregate scores
Aggregator	Score
GameRankings	76.25%
Metacritic	73/100

Review score
Publication	Score
GameSpot	7/10

Driftmoon has received average reviews. Aggregating review websites GameRankings and Metacritic gave the PC game 76.25% and 73/100, respectively.

GameSpot praised the game's writing and humor, but criticized the shallow combat. Destructoid noted that Driftmoon "[seemed] . . . like the perfect introduction to RPGs for someone new to the genre. It's light-hearted, not too difficult on the lower settings, and doesn't overwhelm the player with options in combat or a complicated skill tree." They similarly enjoyed the writing.
