= Powerslide (video game) =

1998 video game

- Developer: Ratbag Games
- Publisher: GT Interactive
- Platform: Windows
- Release: NA: December 9, 1998; EU: 1998
- Genre: Racing
- Mode: Single-player

Powerslide is a post-apocalyptic Microsoft Windows racing game by Australian developer Ratbag Games. It was released in Australia, United States and Europe in 1998. Powerslide was praised for its graphics and AI in particular. A sequel, Powerslide: Slipstream, was in development as of 2004 for PlayStation 2, PC and Xbox, but Ratbag couldn't find a suitable publisher, and shortly after the company was shut down. Powerslide was re-released on GOG.com in 2012.

== Story ==
Powerslide is set in a dystopian future where the ozone layer has disintegrated, leading to worldwide poverty and a collapse of society. Society has rebuilt in two distinct factions - above and below ground. Below ground live the wealthy corporations, in a sterile and controlled environment, whilst above ground live feral communities.

The feral population have taken advantage of the abandoned roads and vehicles, joyriding through deserted streets and countryside, docklands, sewers, and multi-level parking lots. Known as "Powersliding" the races were originally held illegally by feral groups, however the underground corporations have now taken an interest in the sport as well.

== Gameplay ==
Powerslide is set in the near future. There are three main modes: single race, time trial, and championship. Single races can be played on any unlocked track, solo or in online multiplayer. Records can be set in this mode, and saved. Time trials involve only a lone player in a sort of practice run for any given track. Championships consist of consecutive sets of tracks, mainly the Novice, Advanced, and Expert championships. The Insane level can be attempted if the Expert championship is completed.

The game is a "drive anywhere" arcade racer; there are no invisible walls or track side facades holding the vehicle back, allowing the player to explore the tracks at will during races. Cheat codes, which can simply be typed in during a race, can be discovered by reaching out-of-the-way places across the tracks. By beating championships, new cars and tracks are unlocked. The supercar can be earned by beating the Expert championship.

Powerslide's physics engine has four-wheel independent suspension, giving the cars full six degrees of freedom movement. The player is not stuck to a flat track, and the physics model realistically simulates powersliding over varying surface types and rugged terrains. The physics engine also allows driving over any in-game scenery such as mountains, walls and hidden areas.

Force feedback is generated from information supplied directly from the physics engine. Slide and deflection forces acting upon the front wheels are transmitted directly to the force feedback device. Forces are also generated from collisions with other cars or awkward landings from jumps. All of these forces are generated in response to the particular conditions the driver is experiencing at the time. As a result, force feedback adds valuable information to the driving experience and makes it easier to feel what the vehicle is doing. This is in contrast to most other racing games, in which a series of canned force feedback events are triggered by different terrains or generic game events.

Powerslide supports up to 12 players via online modes. Two game modes are included in multiplayer: single race, and fox and hounds. In fox and hounds, one player is chased by the rest of the players. The player who catches the fox in turn becomes the fox. The aim is to be the first player to accumulate four minutes as the fox. The single races are like the races in the single player mode.

== Development ==
Powerslide was developed from the ground up as a 3D-card-only game for 3dfx Interactive's Voodoo Graphics chipset. This enabled it to produce up to 300,000 polygons per second. The bulk of the code was written to 3dfx's direct API, Glide. The game was developed by 18 people.

3dfx Interactive gave Powerslide a prominent place in its exhibit at E3 1997, sparking interest from a number of companies in publishing the game.

The SFX had the ability to morph into their surroundings by becoming echo-like when in enclosed spaces, allowing the player to judge how far away opponent cars are and how fast they are travelling based upon the audio cues alone. The music in Powerslide is mostly a mixture of techno and rock.

It was planned that PlayStation, Nintendo 64, and arcade versions would follow the release of the PC version, but none of these were ever released.

== Reception ==
Reception

Aggregate score
Aggregator	Score
GameRankings	76%

Review scores
Publication	Score
CNET Gamecenter	6/10
Computer Games Strategy Plus	2.5/5
Computer Gaming World	3/5
GamePro	4/5
GameRevolution	B+
GameSpot	7.5/10
IGN	8.5/10
PC Accelerator	7/10
PC Gamer (US)	78%
PC Zone	78%

The game received "favorable" reviews according to the review aggregation website GameRankings. IGN called the visuals "beautiful" and "fully rendered". The website later gave it the award for "Best Racing Game of the Year" at the Best of 1998 Awards.

The game had 200,000 pre-orders.

== Powerslide: Slipstream ==
A follow-up sequel, Powerslide: Slipstream, as of 2004, was in development by the same company responsible for the original Powerslide. It was to feature enhanced graphics, more of the impressive AI, and online support. It was being developed for PlayStation 2 and PC, and possibly Xbox. However, Ratbag never found a suitable publisher for this game, and the studio was closed by the end of 2005.
