= Ratbag Games =

Company

- Company type: Private
- Industry: Video games
- Founded: 1993; 33 years ago in Adelaide, Australia
- Founder: Richard Harrison; Greg Siegele
- Defunct: 15 December 2005
- Fate: Acquired and shut down by Midway Games
- Number of employees: 60 (2001)

Ratbag Games Pty Ltd was a video game developer based in Australia.

== History ==
Ratbag was founded in 1993 in Adelaide, South Australia, by Richard Harrison and Greg Siegele. Known initially as "Emergent Games", the company took three years to prototype their first title Powerslide. A sequel of Powerslide was in the works for Xbox and PlayStation 2, but never released. Following its acquisition by Midway Games on 4 August 2005, the company was known as "Midway Studios - Australia".

=== Games ===
- Powerslide – Windows
- Dirt Track Racing – Windows
- Dirt Track Racing: Sprint Cars – Windows
- Dirt Track Racing 2 – Windows
- Leadfoot – Windows
- Dirt Track Racing: Australia – Windows
- World of Outlaws: Sprint Cars 2002 – PS2, Windows
- Saturday Night Speedway – PS2, Windows
- The Dukes of Hazzard: Return of the General Lee – PS2, Xbox

== See also ==
- Greg Siegele
