= Donald Duck: Goin' Quackers =

2000 video game

- Developer: Ubi Soft: Ubi Soft Milan (GBC) Ubi Soft Casablanca (N64 / PC / Dreamcast) Ubi Soft Shanghai (PS1 / Advance) Ubi Soft Montreal (PS2 / GC)
- Publisher: Ubi Soft (Note: Disney Interactive published the Microsoft Windows version)
- Designers: Patrice Désilets (Original Game Design, PS2 / GC Lead); Jason Arsenault (N64 / PC / Dreamcast Lead); Yuan Pei Sheng (PS1 Lead); Marc D'Souza (GBC Lead); Sun Wei (Advance Lead)
- Writer: Phillipe Debay
- Composers: Daniel Masson (N64 / PC / Dreamcast / GBC); Shawn K. Clement (PS1 / PS2 / GC / Advance)
- Engine: Rayman 2 (N64 / Dreamcast / PC / PS1)
- Platforms: Game Boy Color, PlayStation, Windows, Nintendo 64, Dreamcast, PlayStation 2, Game Boy Advance, GameCube
- Release: October 2000: Game Boy Color; NA: October 15, 2000; EU: October 20, 2000 PlayStation; NA: October 15, 2000; EU: December 15, 2000 Dreamcast; NA: November 20, 2000; EU: December 15, 2000 Nintendo 64; NA: December 5, 2000; EU: December 8, 2000 Windows; EU: December 2000; NA: August 2001 PlayStation 2; NA: December 21, 2000; EU: December 22, 2000 Game Boy Advance; NA: November 15, 2001; EU: November 16, 2001 GameCube; NA: March 26, 2002; EU: May 3, 2002
- Genre: Platform
- Mode: Single-player

Donald Duck: Goin' Quackers (known as Donald Duck: Quack Attack in Europe) is a 2000 platform game developed and published by Ubi Soft for various consoles and Windows-based personal computers. A version with the same title was released for the Game Boy Color, before it was retitled Donald Duck Advance for the Game Boy Advance. Reviews praised the music, backgrounds and animations, noting the short length and low difficulty as more fun for children.

== Gameplay ==
Goin' Quackers's gameplay is very similar to that of Crash Bandicoot and requires the player to move through various settings in twenty-four levels of four warp rooms, themed Duckie Mountain, Duckburg, Magica DeSpell's Manor and Merlock's Temple. One should dodge various enemies and obstacles throughout the levels and defeat bosses at the end of each warp room.

In bonus levels, the player can outrun a bear, the Beagle Boys' truck, a ghost hand and finally a statue head (in the PS2 and GameCube versions, the ghost hand is last). The viewpoint of the levels can change between a 2D side-scrolling perspective and a 3D perspective. Replaying them to defeat Gladstone's time gives the player advantages.

The player has four lives that can increase by finding special items. Each life gives two opportunities for Donald to touch the enemy. The first time, he becomes angry and throws berserk to the enemies; the second, he loses a life. New outfits which alter cutscenes and idle animations (such as Donald taking photos of the place if he is dressed like a tourist) can be unlocked.

== Plot ==
Goin' Quackers begins with Donald Duck, his arch-rival Gladstone Gander, and inventor Gyro Gearloose watching television reporter Daisy Duck discovering the mysterious, mechanized, Aztec-themed temple ruins of the evil magician Merlock near the volcano. As she tells the story, she is kidnapped by Merlock. Gladstone sets out to find her before Donald, who uses Gyro's new invention, the "Tubal Teleport System", to track down Merlock and Daisy.

However, the machine is too weak to reach Merlock's lair; to do so, Donald must plant antennas at certain locations to boost its power. Along the way, he must compete with Gladstone, reverse the spells that Merlock put on Huey, Dewey, and Louie's toys, and defeat several bosses, including the Beagle Boys and Magica De Spell.

In the end, Donald locates Merlock, defeats him, and rescues Daisy. The temple collapses as Gyro teleports them back to his lab, where Donald receives a kiss from Daisy.

== Development ==
The game was conceptualized by Ubi Soft Montreal in a collaboration with Disney Interactive as a homage to Disney comic book artist Carl Barks, who died in 2000.

=== Versions ===
Different Ubisoft studios developed different versions for multiple consoles. These versions differ with their own levels and music.

Ubi Soft Casablanca developed a version for Windows, Dreamcast and Nintendo 64 on an optimized Rayman 2 engine and includes music composed by Daniel Masson, while Ubi Soft Montreal developed the PlayStation 2 version, which was later released for the GameCube, and features music composed by Shawn K. Clement. Both versions also contain completely different levels.

The PlayStation version was developed by Ubi Soft Shanghai and includes extremely adapted levels from Ubi Soft Casablanca's version as well as custom ones.

A 2D platformer for the Gameboy Color that ditches the original 3D segments for a complete 2D approach to the game, not unlike Ubisoft's original Rayman game, was released by Ubi Soft Milan, developed on the same engine as Rayman 2's Gameboy Color version. This version later got remade with the title Donald Duck Advance for Game Boy Advance. This version was developed by Ubi Soft Shanghai, who were responsible for developing the PS1 version. It was released in 2001 (November 15 in North America and November 16 in the PAL region).

Ubi Soft Casablanca's versions are also characterized by the fact that it was developed in Casablanca (Morocco), making it the first console video game made on the African continent.

== Soundtrack ==
The score for the PlayStation, PlayStation 2 and GameCube versions was composed by Shawn K. Clement, while the music for the PC, Dreamcast and Nintendo 64 versions was composed by Daniel Masson. The Game Boy Color version includes another soundtrack also composed by Daniel Masson, but also includes some songs from the PC/Dreamcast version in a modified, downgraded form.

The Nintendo 64 version contains a midi-adapted version of the PC and Dreamcast version with fewer, different instruments as well as an extremely different style, slight melody differences, as well as some new songs. The music in this version is played incorrectly by the game and thus plays many instruments incorrectly or not at all. Among other things, the music is in a higher octave due to incorrect sample rates.

A repair patch from fans to fix the music was released in 2024.

== Reception ==
Reception

Aggregate scores
Aggregator	Score
GameRankings	(PS) 70.89% (N64) 70.29% (DC) 70.20% (GBA) 68.33% (PS2) 65.48% (PC) 62% (GC) 55.58%
Metacritic	(PS2) 73/100 (DC) 71/100 (PS) 65/100 (N64) 65/100 (GC) 61/100

Review scores
Publication	Score
AllGame	(PS2) (GBA) (GBC/DC)
Electronic Gaming Monthly	(GBC) 8/10 (N64) 6.5/10 (DC) 5.5/10
Famitsu	30/40
Game Informer	(GBC) 7.5/10 (PS/GC) 7/10
GameSpot	(GC) 6.2/10 (PS2) 6/10 (PS) 5.9/10 (DC) 5.5/10
GameSpy	68%
GameZone	(PC) 9/10 (GC) 6.2/10
IGN	(GBC) 8/10 (DC) 7.2/10 (PS2) 7/10 (GBA) 6.5/10 (N64) 6.4/10 (GC) 5.2/10
Nintendo Power	(N64) (GBA) (GC)
Official U.S. PlayStation Magazine	(PS2) (PS)
Official Dreamcast Magazine (US)	(SDC) 5/10

Goin' Quackers has received "mixed or average reviews", according to review aggregator Metacritic. Jon Thompson of Allgame reviewed the PlayStation 2 version and commented that although "it's an easy, competent game, it won't bother you while you're playing it because everything is so darned fun".

Gerald Villoria of GameSpot praised the Nintendo GameCube version's music, saying it was of solid quality with "uplifting" and "upbeat" melodies, but he criticized the game's short length.

IGN's Craig Harris lauded the Game Boy Color version's graphics, citing "stunning" character motions and "beautiful" backgrounds, although he also was dissatisfied with the length of the game.

Villoria also reviewed the Dreamcast version; he felt the CG sequences were "great", and that the character animations were "fluid" and "seamless". He also commented that the level designs were much more interesting than in the PlayStation and Nintendo 64 versions. Although Villoria thought the Dreamcast and PlayStation versions were very similar, he felt the Dreamcast version suffered in terms of gameplay since it didn't feature special moves.

Cory D. Lewis of IGN reviewed the Nintendo 64 version, commenting that the game is better suited for younger players and will bore older gamers. He also stated that despite the Nintendo 64 version reusing the optimized Rayman 2 engine, the visuals in Goin' Quackers couldn't compare to the same level of quality the engine provided a year ago. Moreover, he praised the "bright-colored" cartoon objects and animations.

The PlayStation version was reviewed by Adam Cleveland on IGN, who found the game to be "a lot of fun". He commented that the bosses were creative and fun, but that they were extremely simple and provided little challenge. He summed up the review by stating "Although it may be on the quick and easy side, it's got all the right stuff".

== See also ==
- List of Disney video games
