= Institute of Play =

US 501(c)(3) corporation

- Formation: 2007
- Type: 501(c)(3) corporation
- Headquarters: New York City, New York, United States
- Region served: Worldwide
- Executive Directors: Rebecca Rufo-Tepper, Arana Shapiro
- Website: instituteofplay.org

The Institute of Play (IOP) was a 501(c)(3) corporation founded in 2007. Based in New York City, the institute offered school design services, educator programs, game and curriculum design, and corporate trainings / workshops.

Their initial work promoted game design, games and gaming as a model tool to enhance personal and social development, in particular learning in secondary school students. Within six months of its formation by a group of game designers from gameLab, the Institute of Play received a grant from the John D. and Catherine T. MacArthur Foundation to develop Quest to Learn, a New York City public school designed around game design principles and based on over thirty years of learning research.

The Institute of Play has announced it plans to shut down operations by the third quarter of 2019 and its materials will remain available through licenses through the Connected Learning Lab at the University of California, Irvine.

== Work ==
=== School Design ===
Institute of Play has supported public, private and charter school design projects for over 10 years. Their first success was the design of the New York City public middle and high school Quest to Learn, which opened in 2009. IOP engages in processes to design new programs and schools that encourage innovation, creativity, and collaboration.

=== Educator Programs ===
IOP designs and facilitates research based professional development programs for teachers across subject areas and disciplines. Their programs support educators in bringing play and design into their teaching practice to create more student-centered learning environments. They have worked with teachers from all over the world through in-person workshops and online courses.

=== Curriculum and Game Design ===
IOP partners with schools, educators, and organizations to design, produce, playtest and refine games and other learning materials that engage students in new ways. Past partners and clients include: The Museum of Modern Art, Committee for Children, Brainpop, Acton Academy, and Boys and Girls Club of America. (More info.)

=== Corporate Training and Workshops ===
IOP designs and facilitates hands-on trainings to help businesses, cultural institutions and other organizations use the power of play-based learning in their work. Past clients include: the Museum of Modern Art, the Art Institute of Chicago, the Transamerica Corporation, Gap Inc., Audi, Burberry, Pearson, and Freemantle Media.

== Board ==
- Eric Zimmerman - Chair, Independent game designer & Arts Professor, NYU Game Center.
- Tristan Louis - Vice Chair, Founder at TNL.net. CEO, Casebook PBC
- Steven Masur - Partner at Masur Griffitts + Co, LLP.
- Dawn Barber - Co-founder at NY Tech Meetup.
- Katie Salen Tekinbas - Co-Founder and Chief Designer, Connected Camps.
- Rose Else-Mitchell - Executive Vice President at Houghton Mifflin Harcourt.
- Sophie Rogers-Gessert - Treasurer, Photographer & Business Owner at Shameless Photography.

== Advisory Council ==
- Arnab Basu - Producer, Playdom, Disney Interactive.
- Alessandro D'Ansembourg - Member of the Board of Directors, Flora Family Foundation.
- Carole Artigiani - Founder, President Emerita, Global Kids.
- Steve Arnold - Co-founder and Partner Emeritus, Polaris Partners Co-founder and Vice Chairman, George Lucas Educational Foundation.
- Sally Rosenthal - Executive Vice President, Academy for Social Purpose in Responsible Entertainment.
- Bliksem Tobey - Senior Digital Manager, McKinsey Digital Labs.
- Jay Melican - Senior Research Scientist, Intel Labs' Interaction and Experience Research Group.
- Franklin Madison - Managing Director and Director of Technology Programs, Industrial and Technology Assistance Corporation of New York.
- Seung Taek Peter Lee - CEO, Nolgong
- Rick Litvin - Associate Arts Professor, Kanbar Institute of Film and Television, Tisch School of the Arts.
- Justin Hsu - CEO, Marcopolo Learning.
- Erica Gruen - Principal, Quantum Media.

== Support ==
Funders

- John D. and Catherine T. MacArthur Foundation
- Bill and Melinda Gates Foundation
- Carnegie Corporation of New York
- Intel Corporation
- Robert Wood Johnson Foundation
- National Science Foundation
- Pearson Foundation
- Margulf Foundation
- New Youth City Learning Fund at The New York Community Trust
- Nokia

Partners

- Digital Youth Network
- Remix Learning
- E-Line Media
- CingleVue
- K-12 Embodied Media and Learning Group at ASU
- Parsons The New School for Design
- New York City Department of Education
- New Visions for Public Schools
