= Dirt Track Racing: Sprint Cars =

2000 racing video game

Dirt Track Racing:Sprint Cars (DTRSC)
- Cover art featuring Mark Kinser (front) and Tyler Walker (back)
- Developer: Ratbag Games
- Publisher: WizardWorks
- Designer: David Hewitt
- Platform: Windows
- Release: NA: October 19, 2000; UK: October 27, 2000
- Genre: Racing
- Modes: Single-player, multiplayer

Dirt Track Racing: Sprint Cars is a sprint car racing video game by the now defunct Ratbag Games. It is the second game of the dirt track racing series by Ratbag, which includes Dirt Track Racing (DTR), Dirt Track Racing: Sprint Cars, and Dirt Track Racing 2 (DTR2).

== Background ==
Dirt Track Racing: Sprint Cars, or DTRSC for short, was one of the first authentic sprint car, dirt track racing simulations in the video game market.

== Game modes ==
=== Single-player ===
==== Career ====
In the Career Mode, players race through their careers, earning money to upgrade their cars. Success brings more money, and sponsors, which help pay the bills. Unlike in most other racing games, players can enter any division of racing they choose. The higher the series, the stronger the competition, so a player in the first or second season usually will not advance beyond the B-Main in the top flight of Sprint Car Racing. The only restrictions are that only one race can be entered per weekend, and the track selected being within an unlocked distance from a racer's garage.

==== Quick Action ====
In the Quick Action Mode, players race against computer artificial intelligence (AI) players in regular races consisting of heats and features in short mode, or full racing programs consisting of hot laps, qualifying, heats, semi-features (B-, C-, D-Mains), and features (A-Mains).

=== Multiplayer ===
In Multiplayer Mode, players could race other players from all over the world via GameSpy Client-Servers, which have since been shut down.

== Movie maker ==
Software included in Dirt Track Racing: Sprint Cars allows for the exporting of video clips of game action in AVI format. This is the first game in the Ratbag DTR franchise that allows movies to be exported from the game.

== Unsupported features ==
One of the most used unsupported features is the ability for users to create skins, cars, and tracks easily with outside software. Some players have even found software that allows them to change the .DE2 files to create entirely new cars and tracks, instead of just renaming existing cars.

== Reception ==
Reception

Aggregate score
Aggregator	Score
Metacritic	78/100

Review scores
Publication	Score
Computer Games Strategy Plus	4.5/5
Computer Gaming World	3.5/5
GameSpot	7.2/10
GameZone	10/10
IGN	7.4/10
PC Gamer (US)	85%
PC Zone	52%

The game received "generally favorable reviews" according to the review aggregation website Metacritic.
