= The Dukes of Hazzard: Return of the General Lee =

2004 video game

- North American PlayStation 2 box art
- Developer: Ratbag Games
- Publisher: Ubisoft
- Platforms: PlayStation 2, Xbox
- Release: NA: September 28, 2004; AU: October 14, 2004; UK: October 15, 2004
- Genre: Racing
- Modes: Single-player, multiplayer

The Dukes of Hazzard: Return of the General Lee is a racing video game developed by Ratbag Games and published by Ubisoft. It was released in 2004 for the PlayStation 2 and Xbox consoles. The game is based on the television series The Dukes of Hazzard and was released to coincide with The Dukes of Hazzard film, which was released in 2005.

It is the last game developed by Ratbag Games before their acquisition by Midway Games on August 4, 2005, and closure on December 15.

== Plot ==
The Duke cousins must help Hazzard County's local foster home to pay off its debt in order to remain operational. Boss Hogg has raised the mortgage price for the foster home and is having the interest compounded hourly. He's doing this to fund the building of a statue of himself to be located in the town square and to build a local water reservoir on the site of the foster home's location with the help of Rosco. The player must help the Dukes complete a series of tasks in order to save the foster home before it gets shut down completely. A free roam feature allows the player to drive across all of Hazzard County and enjoy the freedom of ramping the General Lee on various objects to unlock hidden objects.

== Reception ==
Reception

Aggregate score
Aggregator	Score	
Aggregator	PS2	Xbox
Metacritic	52/100	49/100

Review scores
Publication	Score	
Publication	PS2	Xbox
1Up.com	C	C
Game Informer	6/10	6/10
GameRevolution	D	D
GameSpot	5.5/10	5.5/10
GameSpy	N/A	3/5
GameZone	5/10	N/A
IGN	4.5/10	4.5/10
Official U.S. PlayStation Magazine	3.5/5	N/A
Official Xbox Magazine (US)	N/A	4.6/10
X-Play	2/5	2/5

The PlayStation 2 version received "mixed" reviews, and the Xbox version received "generally unfavorable reviews", according to video game review aggregator Metacritic.
