= Dirt Track Racing (video game) =

2000 racing video game

Dirt Track Racing (DTR)
- Cover art of Dirt Track Racing
- Developer: Ratbag Games
- Publisher: WizardWorks Software
- Platform: Microsoft Windows
- Release: EU: November 15, 1999; NA: November 1999
- Genre: Racing
- Modes: Single-player, multiplayer

Dirt Track Racing is a video game by the now defunct developer Ratbag Games. It is the first game in the series, which includes Dirt Track Racing, Dirt Track Racing: Sprint Cars, and Dirt Track Racing 2.

== Reception ==
Reception

Aggregate score
Aggregator	Score
GameRankings	69%

Review scores
Publication	Score
Computer Games Strategy Plus	4.5/5
Computer Gaming World	4.5/5
GameSpot	6.6/10
GameSpy	69%
IGN	8.8/10
PC Gamer (US)	82%
PC Zone	52%

The game received "average" reviews according to the review aggregation website GameRankings. GameSpot said, "Even with all of Dirt Track Racing's finer points, it's hard to overlook its repetitive tracks and racing events." IGN was positive, saying, "Ratbag proves once again that they are the Kings of racing sims, even the bargain brand."

The game won Computer Games Strategy Plus' 1999 "Racing Game of the Year" award. The editors wrote, "It humbles more expensive products with over 30 tracks and dozens of cars, excellent physics ... and plenty of tuning options."
