= Driftland: The Magic Revival =

2019 video game

- Developer: Star Drifters
- Publisher: Star Drifters
- Engine: Unreal Engine 4
- Platforms: macOS; Windows
- Release: WW: April 18, 2019
- Genre: Real-time strategy
- Modes: Single-player, multiplayer

Driftland: The Magic Revival is a 2019 real-time strategy video game published and developed by Star Drifters. Players build an empire, like 4X games, in a fantasy world that has been ravaged by magic.

== Gameplay ==
After warring mages nearly destroy the planet Driftland, they use their magic to hold it together. As conditions improve somewhat, the wars restart. Players control a mage who has the power to move islands. Once moved closer, these islands can be colonized or conquered. Because of the cramped living conditions, players need to continually expand to the other islands to find resources. The world is procedurally generated, and resources are distributed randomly. As players become more powerful, they gain the ability to destroy, terraform, and create islands. Driftland features reduced micromanagement during war. Players do not personally control their troops but give their armies orders on who to attack. The units will then march on their own. It supports singleplayer and up to 6-way multiplayer.

== Development ==
Star Drifters, a Polish independent studio, was founded by two of the co-founders of CI Games. Driftland: The Magic Revival entered early access in November 2017 and was released for macOS and Windows on April 18, 2019.

== Reception ==
Driftland: The Magic Revival received positive reviews on Metacritic. In 2018, Digitally Downloaded said the early access build "suffers from balance issues" but made complex strategy games "accessible and fun". PC Gamer's preview in February 2019 said that it was "beautiful and absorbing" and praised the building and lack of micromanagement. PCGamesN praised its experimentation within the real-time strategy genre, and GamesRadar enjoyed its setting.
