= World of Outlaws: Sprint Cars 2002 =

2002 racing video game

- Cover featuring Mark Kinser's #5M Mopar Parts sprint car
- Developer: Ratbag Games
- Publishers: NA: Infogrames; PAL: Ignition Entertainment
- Platforms: PlayStation 2, Windows
- Release: PlayStation 2: NA: March 27, 2002; PAL: May 2003; Windows: NA: February 12, 2003
- Genre: Racing
- Modes: Single-player, multiplayer

World of Outlaws: Sprint Cars 2002, also known as simply World of Outlaws: Sprint Cars for the Microsoft Windows and PAL region PlayStation 2 versions (often mislabeled as World of Outlaws: Sprint Car Racing 2002), is a sprint car racing video game developed by the Australian developer Ratbag Games and published by Ignition Entertainment in the PAL region and Infogrames in North America for the PS2 and Windows. GameSpot's review of the former console version described its gameplay as "solid" and the physics as "top-notch". The game had a limited sales run; it developed a large following and was widely requested at video game stores.

== Gameplay ==
The career mode starts the player with one car and a small amount of money. The driver has to begin racing at the small selection of tracks which they can afford to travel to, to unlock other tracks, while also entering as many races in the local, regional, World of Outlaws (WoO) support-class and the World of Outlaw races themselves. The sprint car handling becomes more difficult as the player advances to higher classes.

As money is accumulated, new items can be added to the car to upgrade its horsepower and handling. When enough money is accumulated another car with better handling and horsepower can be purchased. Players can choose to sell any car or hold on to several cars at one time. Players also have the option to repair damage that typically takes place on a race weekend. The cost of repairing the car reaches from five to several hundred dollars, depending upon the nature and extent of the damage sustained from the race weekend.

Entering the higher end races (WoO Support, WoO) will require better cars to be able to compete, so winning at the local and regional level is critical to overall success. Doing well in the lower series will help players earn sponsorship that can help them make the necessary upgrades.

The racing happens on dirt ovals - 12 real-world tracks and several simulated ovals. The gameplay is known for its unpredictability: artificial intelligence (AI) cars sometimes drive perfect laps and sometimes spin out after bumping into other sprint cars. The dirt surface can quickly change between laps with the addition of loose dirt, hard surface, and ruts. Another example of its realism is that the player receives a limited number of tearoffs to clean the loose dirt which accumulates on the player's helmet.

Each race event starts with an optional practice session before a qualifying session. The qualifying results are used to set the starting grid in one of two heat races: the top six finishers in the heat race determine the starting order for a trophy dash which sets the top twelve spots in the main event and the lower six finishers in the heat race are entered in a B dash which sets the final four spots in the main event.

== Development and release ==
In 1999 Sony Computer Entertainment Europe (SCEE) signed a two game development deal with Ratbag Games. SCEE revealed one of these under the Spin: Sprint Car Racing title in April 2000 as one of the eight games the company planned to release that year. The game was first showcased in motion to the public at the European Computer Trade Show 2000, with a delayed release date to the third quarter of 2001.

In 2001, Sony backed out from the project and Infogrames took over the publishing role. After the change of publisher, they purchased the exclusive license for the World of Outlaws organisation's Sprint Car Series racing series and retitled the game as World of Outlaws: Sprint Cars 2002. The retitled game was showcased at the 2001 Electronic Entertainment Expo with a January 2002 tentative release date. The release date was later delayed to March 5, 2002, and was ultimately released on April 4 in North America on PlayStation 2 as a budget price release. Nearly a year later, the game was ported to Microsoft Windows and was released on February 12, 2003 in North America. The PlayStation 2 version was also released in the PAL region, more specifically in Europe, Australia and New Zealand by Ignition Entertainment in May 2003, also at a budget price.

== Reception ==
Reception

Aggregate score
Aggregator	Score	
Aggregator	PC	PS2
Metacritic	83/100	80/100

Review scores
Publication	Score	
Publication	PC	PS2
Computer Games Magazine	5/5	N/A
Computer Gaming World	3.5/5	N/A
GamePro	N/A	4.5/5
GameSpot	7.9/10	6.7/10
GameSpy	4/5	94%
IGN	8.5/10	7.3/10
Official U.S. PlayStation Magazine	N/A	4/5
PC Gamer (US)	85%	N/A
X-Play	4/5	N/A

The game received "generally favorable" reviews on both platforms according to the review aggregation website Metacritic. According to Metacritic the game was the fifty-first highest rated PlayStation 2 game in 2002, and the thirty-fifth highest rated PC game in 2003.

As of February 2004 the game sold 12,000 copies in Australia. The game won in the "Best Game" category at the 10th Annual Australian Interactive Media Industry Association Awards.
