= Diner Dash =

2005 video game

- PC version box art
- Developer: Gamelab
- Publisher: PlayFirst
- Designers: Nicholas Fortugno; Peter Lee; Eric Zimmerman
- Artists: Strategy Art; Bon Art Studio
- Series: Diner Dash; Dash
- Platforms: Microsoft Windows, Mac OS X, Mobile, Nintendo DS, Wii, PlayStation Portable, Xbox 360, iOS, Android
- Release: PC: NA: 2005; Nintendo DS: NA: May 13, 2007
- Genres: Strategy, time management
- Mode: Single-player

Diner Dash is a strategy and time management video game initially developed by Gamelab and published by PlayFirst. It is now owned and published by Glu Mobile. It was one of the top-selling downloadable games of all time, available in multiple platforms such as PC, Mac, consoles, and mobile.

An Xbox Live Arcade and PlayStation Network versions were released in November 2009, while the WiiWare version was released in 2010, but this version is no longer available for the WiiWare service. Diner Dash later became a mobile game when ported to mobile phones by Glu Mobile, given a retail release, and made available via a 100% advertising-supported download. Versions have been created for the platforms PlayStation Portable, Nintendo DS, and iOS.

Diner Dash is also used to refer to the Diner Dash franchise, which has spawned numerous sequels. Diner Dash 2: Restaurant Rescue was released in early 2006, Diner Dash: Flo on the Go in late 2006, Diner Dash: Hometown Hero in late 2007, Diner Dash 5: Boom! in early 2010, the first free-to-play Diner Dash went live in late 2014, and the latest installment, Diner Dash Adventures, was released in 2019.

== Story ==
Flo is a white-collar worker with a job at a big stock market company in Dinertown. She is tired of doing all the work and feeling unfulfilled. Flo quits her job, wishing she could work somewhere else. She spots a run-down old diner, which she buys. She has to make enough money to fix up the diner. Later, after earning enough money, she opens a new restaurant called Flo's Tiki Palace, after that a seaside diner called Go with the Flo Fine Seafood Dining, and finally a dazzling restaurant called Chez Flo's.

After the completion of the fourth restaurant, a divine being grants Flo a brand-new form and allows her to work at an Indian restaurant located above Dinertown. After proving her worth, Flo goes her separate way and is ready to help another office worker at her former company establish his diner, repeating the cycle.

== Gameplay ==
The gameplay involves seating customers and guiding Flo around the restaurant to serve them. If players earn enough money after each level, they progress to the next; failing to earn enough cash costs them one of their stars. As the game progresses, Flo updates the dilapidated restaurant, and she builds three more restaurants, which provide new settings. The game is over when all of the stars are lost.

Flo can be moved around the restaurant to complete tasks. As customers arrive at the restaurant, the player must drag and drop them onto a table, where they sit down and read menus. The player then must guide Flo to the table to take their order, which must be taken to the service hatch. After the chef has prepared the meal, Flo must deliver the food. When the customers finish eating, they must be given a check. At this point, they leave a tip and their dishes on the table, departing the restaurant. Flo must clear the dishes before the next set of customers can use the table. Each successful action earns the player points, and performing the same action multiple times in a row earns the player a chain bonus, which is broken once a different action is performed.

Customers have a series of hearts over their heads that indicate their mood. The longer the customer is forced to wait, the more hearts they lose. Each type of customer has different degrees of patience and tipping habits. Flo can perform various actions, such as talking to customers or serving them drinks, to revive these hearts. When customers lose all their hearts, they leave the restaurant, costing the player points. The goal of a level is to earn a certain number of points. There are also expert point totals for advanced players to achieve.

The game has two modes: Career mode, which follows the story of Flo, and Endless Shift, a survival mode in which the player must last as long as possible in a single level.

In the Cooking Dash variation, the player prepares the food instead of bringing the order to the chef for him to prepare it.

== Reception ==
Diner Dash has been mentioned in The New York Times, USA Today, CNN, and a variety of casual game studies, including Nicole Lazzaro's analysis of player emotions at the 2005 Game Developers Conference. Games Magazine gave it a favorable review, calling it "remarkably flexible". The Academy of Interactive Arts & Sciences nominated Diner Dash for "Computer Downloadable Game of the Year" at the 8th Annual Interactive Achievement Awards.
