= Katie Salen =

American game designer, animator and educator

Katie Salen Tekinbaş
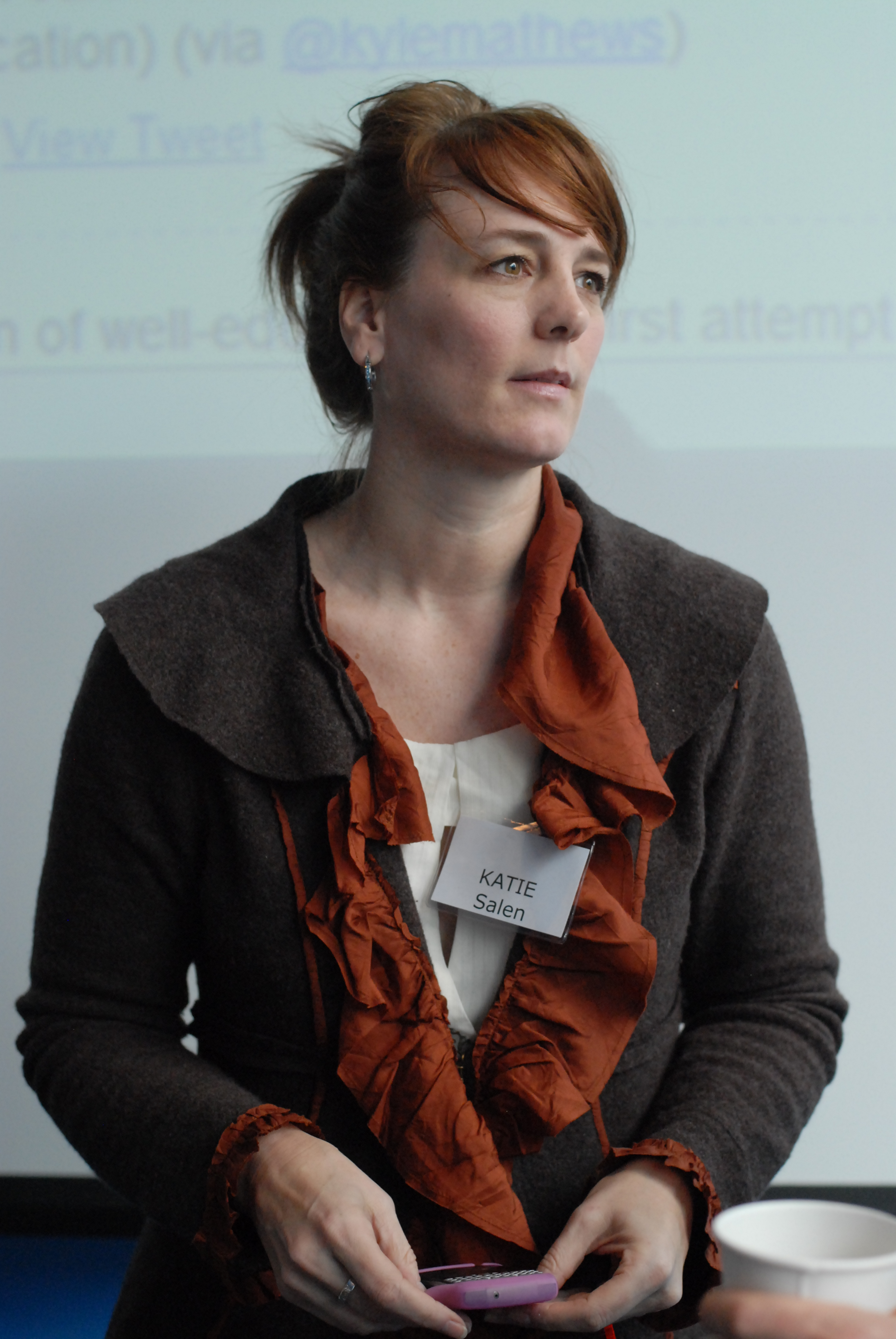
- Katie Salen during Union Square Adventures in March 2009
- Occupations: game designer, animator
- Notable work: Waking Life

Katie Salen Tekinbaş is an American game designer, animator, and educator. She is a professor at the University of California, Irvine. Previously, she taught at DePaul University College of Computing and Digital Media, Parsons The New School for Design the University of Texas at Austin, New York University, and the Rhode Island School of Design. She has an MFA in graphic design from the Rhode Island School of Design.

Salen has received grants as principal investigator or co-principal investigator from the Bill & Melinda Gates Foundation, the MacArthur Foundation, the Carnegie Corporation, and Intel. She is one of the co-authors of Rules of Play, a textbook on game design, and the co-editor of The Game Design Reader, a Rules of Play Anthology, as well as the co-editor of The International Journal of Learning and Media. She is the former Director of Graduate Students for the Design and Technology Program at Parsons The New School for Design, as well as the former Director of the Center for Transformative Media, a research center focused on emerging trends in design and media. She is the Executive Director of Institute of Play, a non-profit learning design studio that bases its work on the principles of games and play. In 2009, she helped design and launch Quest to Learn (Q2L), a public school in Manhattan, New York City, and later participated in developing ChicagoQuest, a charter school in Chicago.

Salen's work has involved the development of slow games, online games, mobile games, and big games, both commercially and institutionally.

== Education ==
Salen graduated from the University of Texas in 1990 with a B.A. in Fine Arts. She holds a Masters of Fine Arts in Graphic Design from the Rhode Island School of Design. At RISD, she studied semiotics with Tom Ockerse, who focused on the work of Charles Sanders Peirce. She also worked with designers Jan van Toorn of the Netherlands, Michael Rock, and Sharon Poggenpohl. She has an honorary Doctorate of Letters from Bank Street College of Education.

== Early career ==
2001–2003

In 2001, Salen started to work at gameLab, where she still serves as a member of the advisory board as of 2010. In 2002, Creative Time in New York hired Salen to develop the curriculum and workshops for the Blur Conference. From 2002–2003, she was a writer and animator for music videos for the band Zero7, which had extended play on MYV, MTV and VH1. Also from 2002–2003, Salen was asked to design the Big Urban Game (BUG), a citywide multiplayer game which was to be played by the residents of Minneapolis and St.Paul in Minnesota as part of the Twin Cities Design Celebration.

The Film Society of Lincoln Center engaged Salen to co-curate with Graham Leggatt, the director of the society, "Game Engine", an evening of programming for the New York Video Festival in 2003. In that same year, Salen started writing for RES Magazine, which focuses on film, design, culture, art and music; She continued as a contributor until 2006.

Also in 2003, Salen worked as part of a research team to create and design an interactive, animated storytelling experience that was to be distributed through Xbox Live!

2004–2006
In 2004, the Hewlett Foundation took on Salen as the co-director for the Games to Learn Symposium. She was also a consultant for the Digital Kids initiative through the MacArthur Foundation, and served as a game designer for a large motion capture game called Squidball that was developed with the Media Research Lab at New York University. In 2004, the Comtech Group (COGO) hired Salen as a consultant for a mobile phone game, and for their online world. The MSN division of Microsoft engaged Salen as a consultant for the redesign of the website in 2004. ATTAP, a group devoted to new web technologies, used Salen as an interactive game designer for their new tools. Salen was also involved in 2005 as a game design consultant with The Rapunzel Project to teach girls computer code. The Buckminster Fuller Institute partnered with the Game Culture & Technology Lab at the University of California, Irvine to create a spaceship earth game, which Salen also worked on in 2005.

From 2004–2006, Mememe Productions in Melbourne, Australia, had Salen design a game for a children's television show and for their online community site, while from 2005-2006 she worked on the ISEA2006 Symposium in San Jose, California. This was presented by CADRE Interactive City residency. From 2003 until 2006, Salen was the Director of Graduate Students for the Design and Technology Program at Parsons The New School for Design. Salen was faculty at DePaul University's College of Computing and Digital Media in Chicago, USA.

== Early projects ==
Karaoke Ice

Salen worked on this project alongside Nancy Nowacek and Marina Zurkow in August 2006. The project transformed an ice cream truck into a mobile karaoke unit which roamed the streets of San Jose, California, inviting people towards it with free popsicles. Everyone and anyone was invited to participate in a live karaoke session which would be recorded to be played over loudspeakers later. The songs that were available to sing included "Hey Ya!" by Outkast, "These Boots are Made for Walking" by Nancy Sinatra, and "R.E.S.P.E.C.T." by Aretha Franklin.

Big Urban Game

Along with Frank Lantz and Nick Fortugno, Salen was asked to help design this large-scale urban game for part of the Twin Cities Design Celebration. All residents were encouraged to participate in the race, the goal of which was to move a 25-foot high inflatable game piece through a route throughout the Twin Cities, hitting several "checkpoints." Salen created this game to engage a large community with culture and with each other, in an effort to make the residents more aware of urban design.

Waking Life

Salen worked as an animator for this critically acclaimed feature film, directed by Richard Linklater. The film explores topics such as free will, determinism, dreams and the nature of reality.

== Recent projects ==
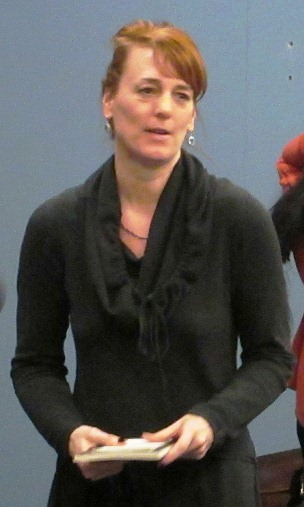
Salen at Quest to Learn, February 2013

Institute of Play

Salen is the Executive Director of Institute of Play, an organization that promotes games as a learning tool for the 21st century. Institute of Play has used games, play and the principles that underlie them to design schools, programs, games, events, digital platforms and products. Some projects Institute of Play has produced include Quest to Learn, SMALLab (Situated Multimedia Art Learning Lab) Games, Mobile Quest summer camp, and Gamestar Mechanic Strategy Guide. Institute of Play also produced the video game design lab GlassLab, which is developing game-based assessments in partnership with Electronic Arts and Entertainment Software Foundation.

Quest to Learn (Q2L)

Salen is a designer of Quest to Learn, a public school in Manhattan, New York City created out of a collaboration between Institute of Play and the New York City Department of Education, with backing from the MacArthur Foundation and support from New Visions for Public Schools. The school began in the 2009–2010 school year with one sixth grade class, and will add a new grade every year until 2015, when it will be a fully functioning combined middle and high school encompassing grades 6-12. It is located in the Bayard Rustin Educational Complex in the Chelsea neighborhood of Manhattan.

Q2L's standards-based curriculum is developed collaboratively by teachers, game designers, and curriculum designers. Curriculum design mimics the design principles of games by framing every piece of the curriculum as a mission that involves game strategies like collaboration, role-playing and simulation. The school encourages hands-on problem solving, and is designed to promote learning of 21st Century Skills many experts say are necessary for college and career success, such as systems thinking, collaboration, and digital literacy. Not only do students play games in the classrooms, they learn to make them in order to demonstrate their systems thinking skills.

Embodied play

One of Salen's current projects is a collaboration with David Birchfield and Mina Glenberg-Johnson from Arizona State University. It focuses on "embodied play in mixed reality environments."

Connected Camps

Another of Salen's current projects is connected camps. She is co-founder and Chief Creative Officer of Connected Camps.

== Works ==
- (editor) The Politics of Design (Zed 1). Center for Design Studies, 1995. ISBN 1885801009
- (editor) Zed 5 / Beyond the Object: The Implications Project. Center for Design Studies, 1998. ISBN 0971544468
- (with Eric Zimmerman) Rules of Play: Game Design Fundamentals. MIT Press, 2003. ISBN 0262240459
- (with Eric Zimmerman) The Game Design Reader: A Rules of Play Anthology. MIT Press, 2005. ISBN 0262195364
- (editor) The Ecology of Games: Connecting Youth, Games, and Learning. MIT Press, 2007. ISBN 026269364X
- (with Robert Torres, Loretta Wolozin, Rebecca Rufo-Tepper, and Arana Shapiro) Quest to Learn: Growing a School for Digital Kids. MIT Press, 2010. ISBN 0262515652
- (with Melissa Gresalfi) Gaming the System: Designing with Gamestar Mechanic. MIT Press, 2014. ISBN 026202781X
