= Downtown Run =

2003 video game

- PAL region PlayStation 2 cover art featuring the Saab 9-3 Cabrio (left), the Volkswagen New Beetle (middle), and the Audi TT (right)
- Developers: Ubi Soft Bucharest; Com2uS (Mobile)
- Publishers: Ubi Soft; Com2uS (Mobile)
- Platforms: PlayStation 2, Windows, GameCube, Mobile
- Release: PlayStation 2 and Microsoft Windows: FRA/GER/NED: March 27, 2003; UK: March 28, 2003; NA/RUS: June 30, 2003 (Windows); GameCube: NA: April 29, 2003; Mobile: WW: July 17, 2003
- Genres: Racing, vehicular combat
- Modes: Single-player, multiplayer

Downtown Run, known in North America as City Racer, is a racing vehicular combat game developed by Ubi Soft Bucharest and published in 2003 for PlayStation 2, Microsoft Windows, GameCube, and mobile phones. The game features many different cars, game modes and tracks. In most game modes, you can collect power-ups to maximise your chance of winning or slow down opponents.

== Reception ==
Reception

Aggregate score
Aggregator	Score	
Aggregator	GameCube	PC
Metacritic	58/100	79/100

Review scores
Publication	Score	
Publication	GameCube	PC
Nintendo Power	2.6/5	N/A
PC Gamer (US)	N/A	79%

The Windows version received "generally favorable reviews", while the GameCube version received "mixed" reviews, according to the review aggregation website Metacritic.
