= Druuna: Morbus Gravis =

2001 video game

- Developer: Artematica
- Publisher: Microids
- Platform: Microsoft Windows
- Release: FRA: September 28, 2001; NA: November 28, 2001
- Genres: Adventure game, survival horror
- Mode: Single-player

Druuna: Morbus Gravis is a 2001 video game, based upon the science fiction and fantasy comic book character of Druuna. The adventure game was developed for Microsoft Windows by Artematica and published by Microids.

The game has three different modes of play: Arcade/Adventure and 3D real time Interactive full motion video. There are 60 minutes' worth of cinematics in full motion video. Gameplay reveals a CGI rendered industrial world where monsters and enemies and the environment can surprise Druuna in fatal ways.

== Reception ==
Reception

Aggregate score
Aggregator	Score
Metacritic	26/100

Review scores
Publication	Score
Adventure Gamers	1/5
Computer Games Magazine	1.5/5
Computer Gaming World	1/5
Gamekult	2/10
GameSpot	2.6/10
GameSpy	20%
GameStar	9%
Jeuxvideo.com	9/20
PC Games (DE)	38%
PC Zone	12%

The game received "generally unfavorable reviews" according to the review aggregation website Metacritic.
