= Diner Dash: Hometown Hero =

2007 video game

- Developer: PlayFirst
- Publisher: PlayFirst
- Designers: Chris Bennett; Michelle Woods
- Artists: Barry Prioste; Jeff Troupe
- Series: Diner Dash
- Engine: Playground SDK
- Platforms: Windows, Mac OS X
- Release: November 8, 2007
- Genre: Strategy
- Modes: Single-player, multiplayer

Diner Dash: Hometown Hero is the fourth installment in the Diner Dash series of casual games. It was developed and published by PlayFirst, and was launched on September 25, 2007.

== Story ==
Flo returns to her hometown to visit her Grandma, Florence, only to find the place in such a desperate state it looks like a run-down ghost town. Flo decides to use her culinary skills to rejuvenate the town by improving the eateries at all the formerly popular hangouts.

Flo and Grandma begin with the zoo, only to discover the zoo is now desolate. They head to the cafe, but are appalled at the service. The cafe waiter tells them that the reason for the zoo's poor state is recent funding cuts by the city council. The two rejuvenate the zoo and it becomes successful again.

Flo and Grandma then head to the baseball park to watch a game, but attendance is poor. The park's diner is just as lackluster, as Flo and Grandma hear a customer complain that the hot dog he waited for 30 minutes has turned cold. They then revive the baseball park and bring it to its former glory.

Flo and Grandma visit the museum and find it in a state of depression. Flo finds a flyer that Grandma drops, but the latter quickly takes it back. Flo's favorite dinosaur fossil is gone. The janitor is all alone, as he also has to work as the curator, and the grill's cook and waiter, all at the same time. Flo and Grandma then revive the museum with the help of the customers and the museum celebrates its grand reopening.

Flo and Grandma later go to the Boardwalk Beach. During the trip, Grandma Florence tells Flo about the discotheque she used to own when she was younger, shown in Grandma's flyer. When Flo notices an old building, which was apparently the aforementioned disco, Grandma says that she was unable to keep it afloat, and all that is left now is a parking lot. Flo and Grandma head to a shack at the park for a funnel cake, but decide to help the poorly managed waiters when they see how bad the amusement park has got.

Once the amusement park has been successfully restored, Flo decides to take a ride on the park's rollercoaster before leaving and ends up warping back in time; it turns out the rollercoaster is an actual time machine. Flo finds herself in the 70's and discovers Grandma Florence's disco. She runs inside, where she meets a younger Florence in her 30's. Flo then resolves to help Florence keep her eatery afloat by helping her.

After helping Florence, Flo says goodbye, runs back to the rollercoaster, and warps back to the present time. When Flo encounters Grandma Florence in the present, she tells her about the disco and discovers that Florence's Groovy Disco is up and running. Grandma tells Flo that a woman who looks familiar to her had helped her. Flo and Grandma Florence enter the disco and celebrate its anniversary.

== Gameplay ==
Gameplay involves seating customers as they enter the restaurant. One must drag and drop each group of customers to a table appropriate for their group size. Extra points are given for seating a customer in a chair that is the same color as the customer's clothing. Playing as Flo, the player must then take the customers' orders, send the order to the kitchen, deliver the food, give the group the check, and clean the table for new customers.

There is hardly ever only one group of customers at a time, so the player must use time management in order to keep all of the customers happy. Each group of customers has a row of hearts that indicates their mood. If this meter ever drains out, the customers will leave angry, costing the player a large amount of money, but if the customers remain happy, they will tip well once they leave. Each level has a score goal, indicating the amount of money that one must earn in order to proceed to the next level. On every level, there will be a selection of new upgrades for the restaurant. New elements are also added, such as spills and desserts, adding more of the challenge element to the levels.

There is also a "continuous shift" mode where there is no story. Instead, the player simply tries to earn as much money as possible by serving groups of customers that continuously appear in line. The game ends as soon as five groups of customers leave angry.

At certain levels in the game, Flo hires an assistant. In these levels, the only goal is to help Flo make more money than her assistant. It incorporates a new element of friendly competition into the game, allowing for a more engaging gameplay instead of merely going against the clock.

== Expansion packs ==
There are three themed expansion packs that can be bought separately, also featuring Flo and Grandma:

- Seasonal Snack Pack: In Grandma's workshop, Flo and Grandma find Grandma's photo album and look at five old pictures. The story then goes through five flashbacks involving Flo reviving business at a water park's café, serving food at a haunted house owned by the Count, managing the Harvest Festival with Yoshino after Grandma injuries herself, serving food at a ski resort after she and Margarita accidentally injure the resort's staff while in a race, and reviving the restaurant where Grandma met Flo's grandfather. Afterwards, Flo and Grandma leave the workshop.
- Flo Through Time: At Flo's diner, Grandma creates a time machine out of Flo's microwave, but it accidentally sends them and the guests through four time periods: B.C., Ancient Egypt, medieval times, and an unidentified time period with pirates. Every use of the time machine causes it to break, prompting Flo to serve food and make enough money to buy new parts to fix it. Flo, Grandma, and the guests all end up in the future where the time machine breaks completely. A scientist explains that he brought them here so to demonstrate how to run a restaurant. Once that is done, the scientist sends them all back to the present using a larger version of Grandma's time machine; however, they discover that people from the time periods that they visited are in the present.
- Once Upon a Diner: Grandma buys a magic lamp, but Flo doesn't believe in magic. After Grandma slips and drops the lamp near Bernie the Bookworm, he unknowingly drinks from it while wishing that everything will be like the fairy tales that he's currently reading. This causes him, Flo, and Grandma to be transported through five fairy tale worlds based on Arabian Nights, Alice in Wonderland, Jack and the Beanstalk, Cinderella, and the Wizard of Oz, with Grandma appearing in various forms based on the world. Flo must serve food to get enough money to buy what they need to progress to the next world. In the end, she and Bernie are advised to use the lamp that Bernie still had with him to return home. Back in the diner, Grandma claims that they were gone in a second, but secretly hides a broken wand behind her back.

== See also ==
- Diner Dash
