= Dirt Track Racing 2 =

2002 racing video game

- Developer: Ratbag Games
- Publisher: Infogrames
- Platform: Windows
- Release: NA: September 24, 2002; AU: October 29, 2003
- Genre: Racing
- Modes: Single-player, multiplayer

Dirt Track Racing 2 (DTR2) is a video game developed by the now defunct Ratbag Games and published by Infogrames. It is the third and final game in the Dirt Track Racing series by Ratbag.

== Reception ==
Reception

Aggregate score
Aggregator	Score
Metacritic	74/100

Review scores
Publication	Score
Computer Gaming World	3.5/5
GameSpot	7.1/10
GameSpy	3.5/5
GameZone	7.3/10
PC Gamer (US)	78%

The game received "average" reviews according to the review aggregation website Metacritic.
