= Rules of Play =

Book by Katie Salen and Eric Zimmerman

Rules of Play: Game Design Fundamentals
- Author: Katie Salen, Eric Zimmerman
- Subject: Game design
- Publisher: MIT Press
- Publication date: 2003-10-01
- Media type: hardback
- Pages: 688
- ISBN: 978-0-262-24045-1
- OCLC: 51879625
- Dewey Decimal: 794.8/1526 21
- LC Class: QA76.76.C672 S25 2003

Rules of Play: Game Design Fundamentals is a book on game design by Katie Salen and Eric Zimmerman, published by MIT Press.

== Overview ==
Rules of Play expresses the perspective that a theoretical framework for interactive design has not yet been established.

This is not the first time this has been recognized or explored, but is explored in a fresh way in great detail - with one review stating that: "the book manages to bridge the emerging field of game studies methodologies and design theory".

Another review was also positive: "And if you already are a game designer? In this case, you stand a good chance of becoming a better game designer. Your perception of the internal workings of games will be heightened. You will see structure where before you saw chaos. You will see possibilities where before you saw dead ends. You will see opportunities for meaningful play in every nook and cranny of the game you are working on right now."

The book is divided into four units, first introducing core concepts, then expanding on these with a detailed discussion of rules, play and culture.

=== Unit 1: Core Concepts ===
- Meaningful play - The authors introduce the concept of meaningful play as the goal of successful game design, providing their own definitions.
- Design - The authors discuss definitions of design, and introduce their own. They go on to discuss semiotics, the study of meaning, describing Charles Sanders Peirce's semiotic elements.
- Systems - The authors introduce four elements all systems share, as defined by Stephen Littlejohn in his textbook Theories of Human Communication, and go on to identify each of these elements in the game of chess, when framed as a formal (mathematical), experiential (social), or cultural (representational) system.
- Interactivity - The authors connect interactivity with the concepts introduced thus far, and identify various modes of interactivity, citing examples of cognitive, functional, explicit, and "beyond-the-object" interactivity.
- Defining Games - The authors discuss the relationship between play and games, highlight existing definitions of a game, and provide their own intentionally narrow definitions of games and game design.
- Defining Digital Games - The authors insist that "the underlying properties of games and the core challenges of game design hold true regardless of the medium in which a game manifests," but they do identify four traits that are particularly strong in digital games: Immediate but narrow interactivity, the manipulation of information, automated complex systems, and networked communication.
- The Magic Circle - The authors borrow the term magic circle from the book Homo Ludens by Johan Huizinga, using it to describe the space within which a game takes place. They explain how players enter into the magic circle by adopting a lusory attitude, another borrowed term, taken from Bernard Suits' book Grasshopper: Games, Life, and Utopia.

=== Unit 2: Rules ===
- Defining Rules
- Rules on Three Levels
- The Rules of Digital Games
- Games as Emergent Systems
- Games as Systems of Uncertainty
- Games as Information Theory Systems
- Games as Systems of Information
- Games as Cybernetic Systems
- Games as Game Theory Systems
- Games as Systems of Conflict
- Breaking the Rules

=== Unit 3: Play ===
- Defining Play
- Games as the Play of Experience
- Games as the Play of Pleasure
- Games as the Play of Meaning
- Games as Narrative Play
- Games as the Play of Simulation
- Games as Social Play

=== Unit 4: Culture ===
- Defining Culture
- Games as Cultural Rhetoric
- Games as Open Culture
- Games as Cultural Resistance
- Games as Cultural Environment

== Guest contributions ==
The book is punctuated by guest contributions, including one essay and four commissioned games, each discussed alongside various prototype materials.

- Foreword: Frank Lantz
- Commissioned Essay: Reiner Knizia
- Unit 1: Commissioned Game: Richard Garfield
- Unit 2: Commissioned Game: Frank Lantz
- Unit 3: Commissioned Game: Kira Snyder
- Unit 4: Commissioned Game: James Ernest

== See also ==
- List of books on computer and video games
