= Game =

Structured form of play

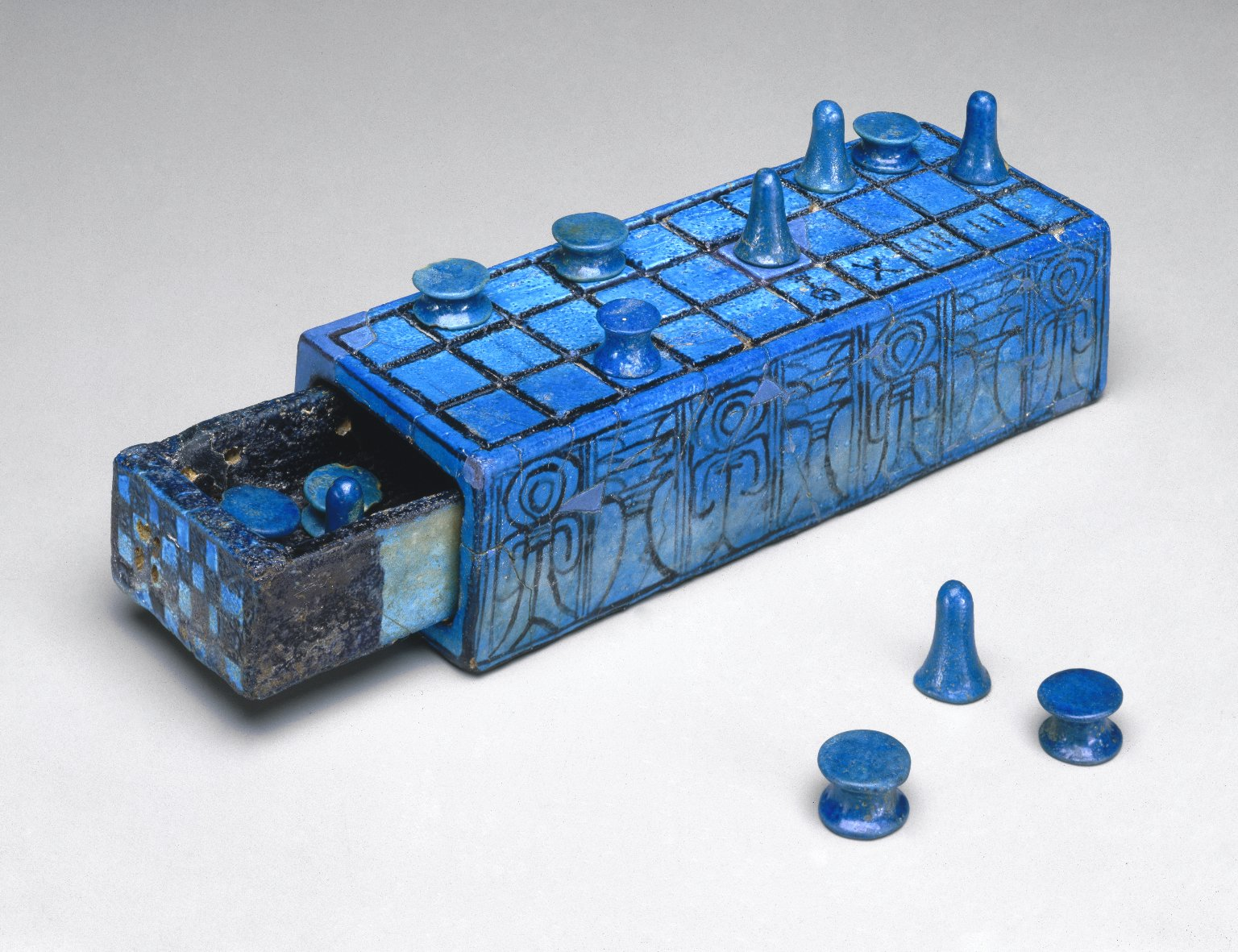
Ancient Egyptian senet game board inscribed for Amenhotep III with separate sliding drawer. Created between 1390 and 1353 BC; made of glazed faience, dimensions: 5.5 × 7.7 × 21 cm. Held in the Brooklyn Museum, (New York City).

A game is an activity defined by a challenge and a set of rules, typically done for enjoyment, competition, or development. Games may be played informally or in professional competitive settings before audiences. Popular formats include board games, card games, video games, and sports, distinguished from unstructured play by having rules. Scholars have long debated the essence of games, with no single definition achieving universal acceptance.

Games are a universal feature of human culture. The Royal Game of Ur and Senet are among the oldest known games, dating back to at least 2600 BCE. Throughout history, games have served as tools for entertainment, teaching, ritual, and socialization. In the modern era, the global video game industry has grown to surpass both film and music in annual revenue, reflecting how central games have become to contemporary life.

Philosophically, games have attracted attention as a test case for the nature of rules and meaning. Psychologists link play to cognitive development in children and to the intense, satisfying concentration called flow in adults. Game theory uses the structure of games to model decision making in fields such as economics and evolutionary biology.

== Definitions ==
=== Ludwig Wittgenstein ===
Ludwig Wittgenstein is well known in the history of philosophy for having addressed the definition of the word game. In his Philosophical Investigations, Wittgenstein argued that the elements of games, such as play, rules, and competition, all fail to adequately define what games are. From this, Wittgenstein concluded that people apply the term game to a range of disparate human activities that bear to one another only what one might call family resemblances.

=== Bernard Suits ===
Bernard Suits offers this definition of games in Grasshopper: Games, Life and Utopia (1978). "To play a game is to engage in activity directed towards bringing about a specific state of affairs, using only means permitted by rules, where the rules prohibit more efficient in favour of less efficient means, and where such rules are accepted just because they make possible such activity." He calls players' state of mind lusory attitude, accepting unnecessary obstacles in order to play.

=== Roger Caillois ===
French sociologist Roger Caillois, in his book Les jeux et les hommes (Games and Men)(1961), defined a game as an activity that must have the following characteristics:

- fun: the activity is chosen for its light-hearted character
- separate: it is circumscribed in time and place
- uncertain: the outcome of the activity is unforeseeable
- non-productive: participation does not accomplish anything useful
- governed by rules: the activity has rules that are different from everyday life
- fictitious: it is accompanied by the awareness of a different reality

=== Other definitions ===
- "A game is a form of art in which participants, termed players, make decisions in order to manage resources through game tokens in the pursuit of a goal." (Greg Costikyan) According to this definition, some "games" that do not involve choices, such as Chutes and Ladders, Candy Land, and War are not technically games any more than a slot machine is.
- "A game is a form of play with goals and structure." (Kevin J. Maroney)
- "A game is a system in which players engage in an artificial conflict, defined by rules, that results in a quantifiable outcome." (Katie Salen and Eric Zimmerman)
- "A game is an activity among two or more independent decision-makers seeking to achieve their objectives in some limiting context." (Clark C. Abt)
- "At its most elementary level then we can define game as an exercise of voluntary control systems in which there is an opposition between forces, confined by a procedure and rules in order to produce a disequilibrial outcome." (Elliot Avedon and Brian Sutton-Smith)
- "When you strip away the genre differences and the technological complexities, all games share four defining traits: a goal, rules, a feedback system, and voluntary participation." (Jane McGonigal)

== History ==
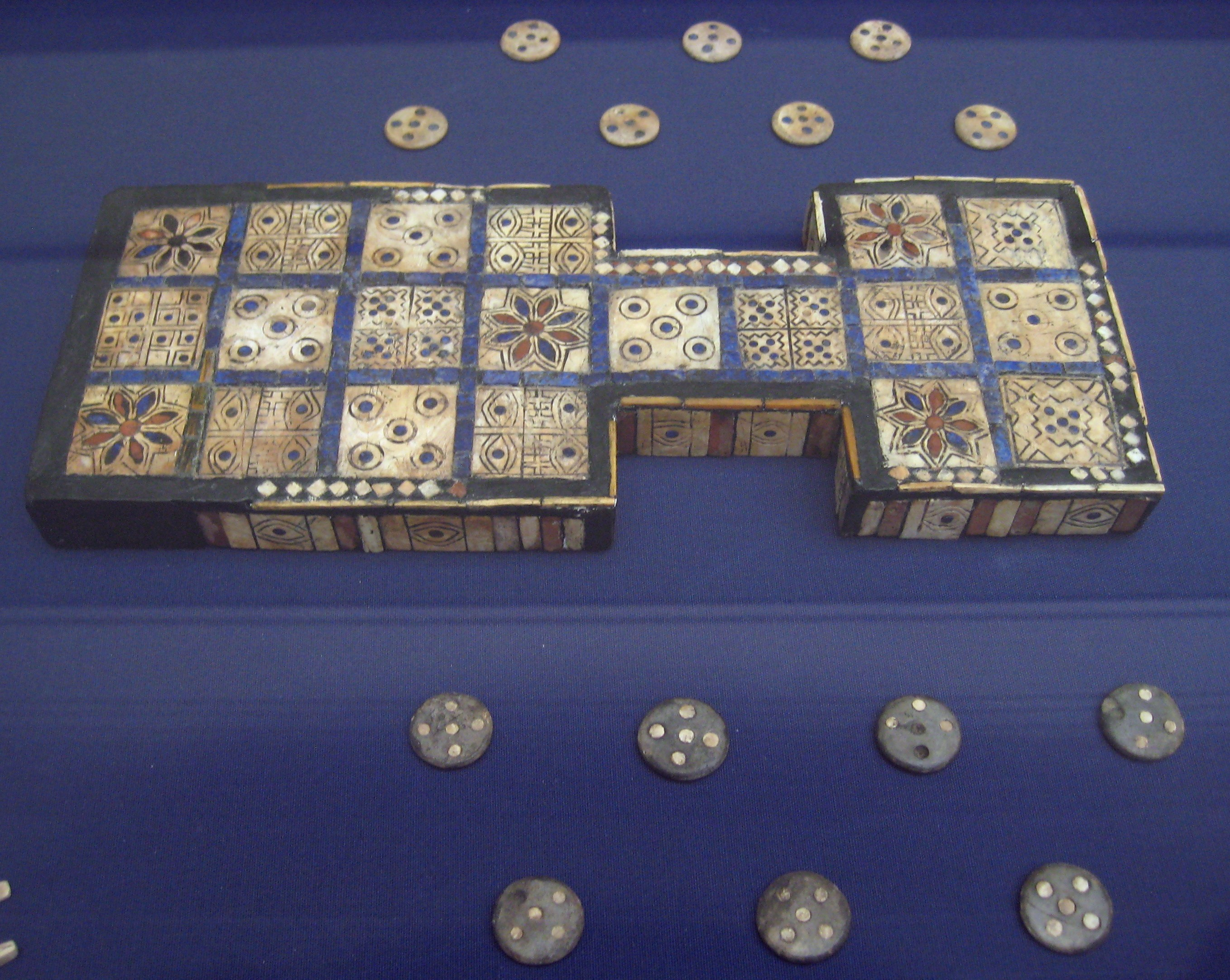
Royal Game of Ur

The history of games goes back millennia. The Royal Game of Ur, from ancient Mesopotamia in roughly 2600 BCE, is among the oldest known board games. A cuneiform tablet from the 2nd century BCE contained its rules, representing the earliest recorded game design. Senet, a board game played in ancient Egypt, was important enough to be portrayed in tomb artwork with fragments of the board found from approximately 3100 BCE. A gameboard inscribed for Amenhotep III (c. 1390 – c. 1353 BCE) survives intact. Both were race games and precursors to backgammon. Senet had religious significance with the board representing the pathway through the netherworld.

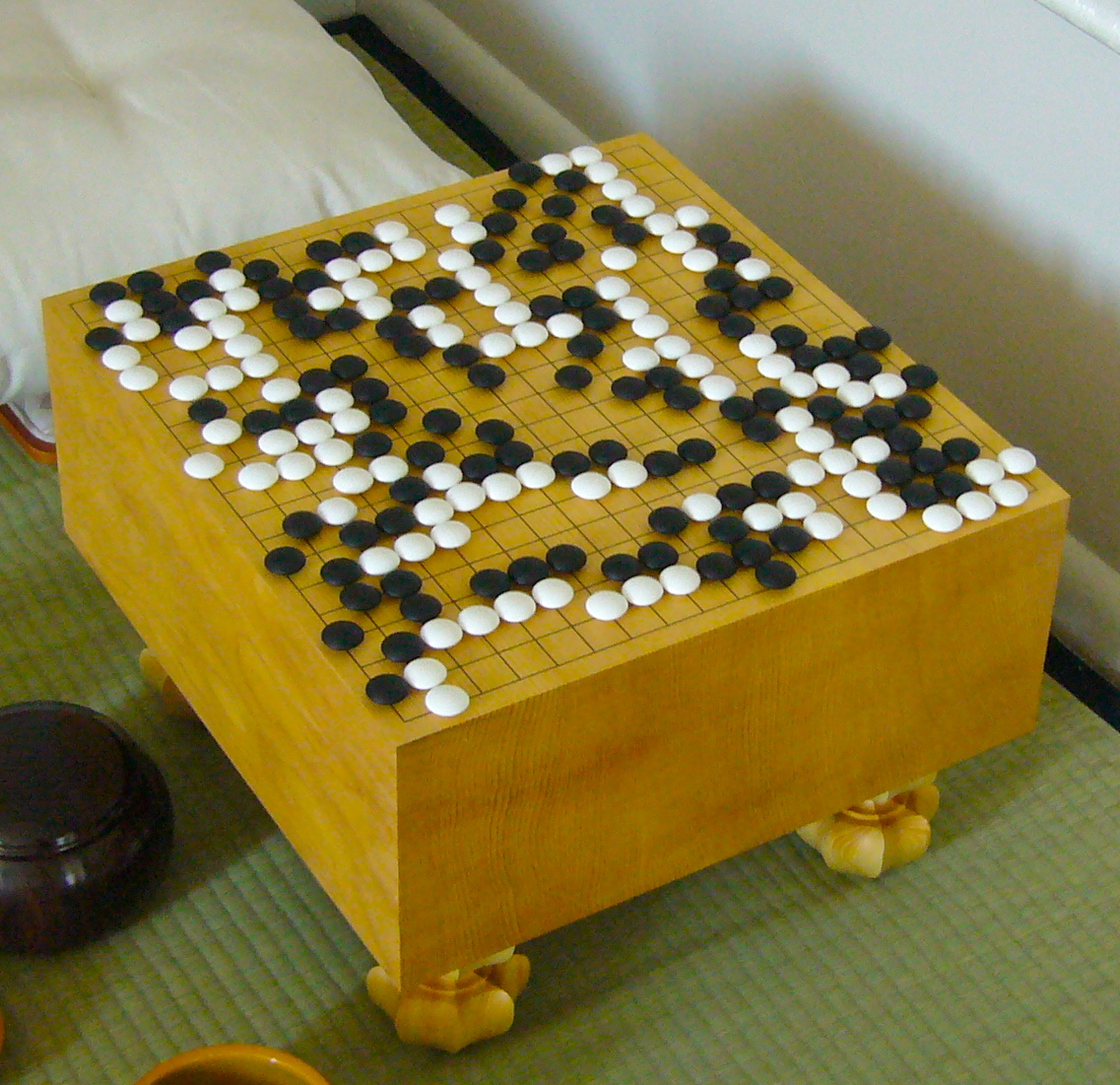
A game of Go in progress

In East Asia, the board game Go has written accounts as early as the Spring and Autumn period. Go's strategic complexity resisted computation until deep learning advances in AlphaGo. Other ancient games include mancala, a count-and-capture game with Neolithic versions found in Jordan from approximately 6900 BCE.

Chess traces back to the Gupta Empire of India around the 6th century CE with chaturanga a likely ancestor. It spread through Persia as chatrang, and entered Europe via the Moorish Spain, approaching its modern form by the 15th century.

Playing cards may date to Tang dynasty China (618–907 CE), reaching Europe via the Mamluk Sultanate in the 14th century. With mass production, standardized regional decks eventually evolved.

Pachisi, played in the Mughal court, served as the basis for Parcheesi and Ludo. The Aztecs in Central America played a race game called patolli.

In the 20th century, developments included the rise of mass-market tabletop games such as Monopoly, Scrabble, Clue, and Trivial Pursuit and the emergence of video games. Pong, the first commercially successful arcade video game appeared in 1972. In the 21st century, the global video game industry had grown to surpass film and music in annual revenue.

== Gameplay elements and classification ==
Games can be characterized by "what the player does". This is often referred to as gameplay. Major key elements identified in this context are tools and rules that define the overall context of game.

=== Tools ===
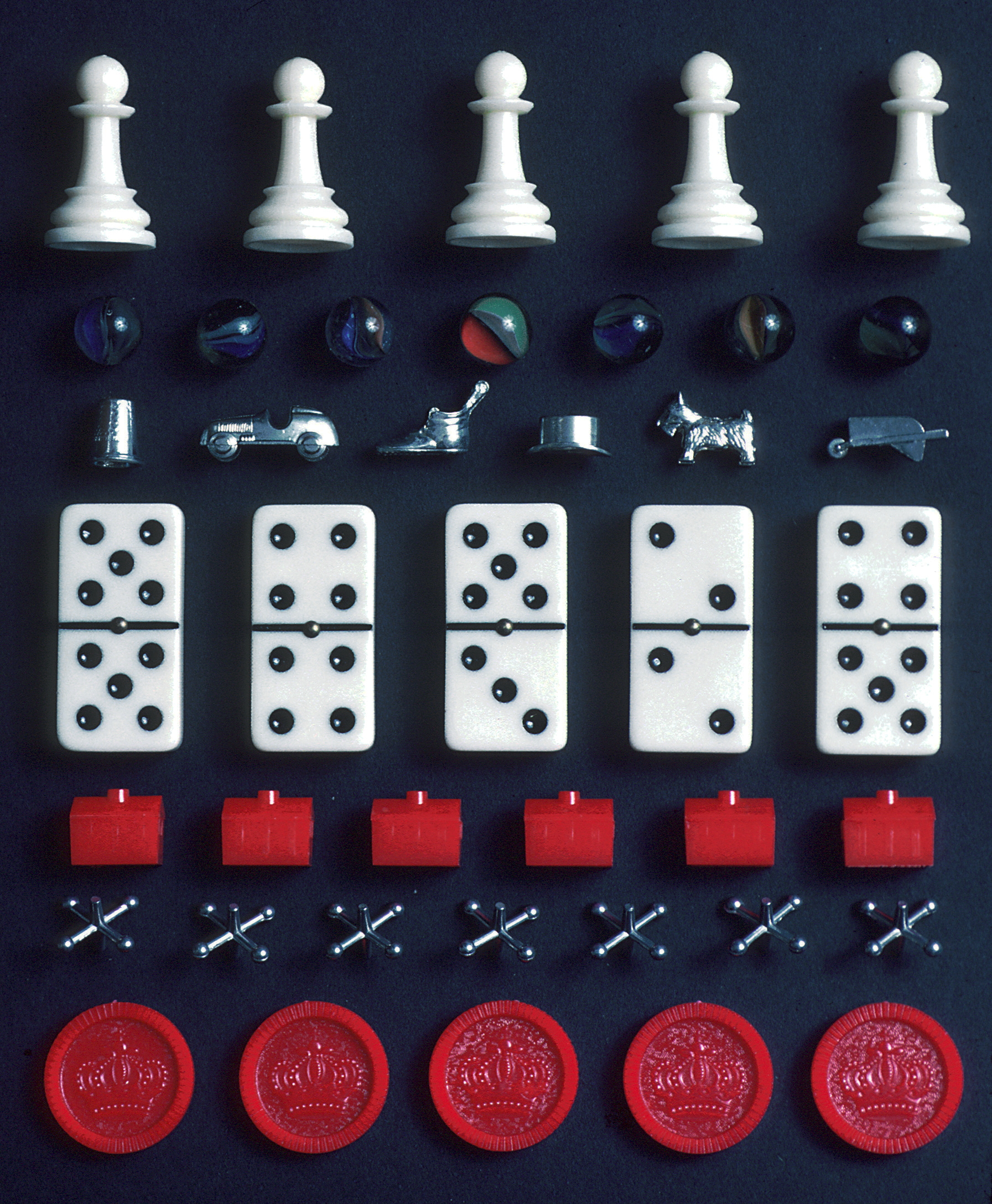
A selection of pieces from different games. From top: Chess pawns, marbles, Monopoly tokens, dominoes, Monopoly hotels, jacks and checkers pieces.

Games are often classified by the components required to play them. Common categories include tabletop games (using boards, cards, tokens, dice, or other items), card games (using a standard deck or game-specific cards), dice games, video games (using electronic hardware), and games with no equipment like hide-and-seek.

Game tokens are the means used to manage resources and achieve goals. Pieces in a board game, cards in a card game, and characters in a role-playing game are tokens.

The ball has been a popular game piece for millennia, resulting in a worldwide popularity of ball games such as rugby, basketball, soccer (football), cricket, tennis, and volleyball. Other tools are more idiosyncratic to a certain region. Playing cards in Europe had decks with suits that varied from country to country before standardization. Other games, such as chess, may be traced primarily through the development and evolution of their game pieces.

=== Rules and aims ===
Game structures include boundaries, rules, goals, and scoring systems.

Game rules specify how actions are allowed to work. The rules of a game may be distinguished from its aims. For most competitive games, the ultimate aim is winning: in this sense, checkmate is the aim of chess. Common win conditions are being the first to amass a certain quota of points or tokens (as in Settlers of Catan), having the greatest number of tokens at the end of the game (as in Monopoly), or some relationship of one's game tokens to those of one's opponent (as in chess's checkmate). Intermediate goals can provide motivation when long-term goals may be far off.

An aim identifies a sufficient condition for successful action, whereas the rule identifies a necessary condition for permissible action. For example, the aim of chess is to checkmate, but although it is expected that players will try to checkmate each other, it is not a rule of chess that a player must checkmate the other player whenever possible. Some games include rules about changing rules. In Nomic, invented by philosopher Peter Suber, players' turns include proposing rule changes and voting upon them.

=== Skill, strategy, and chance ===
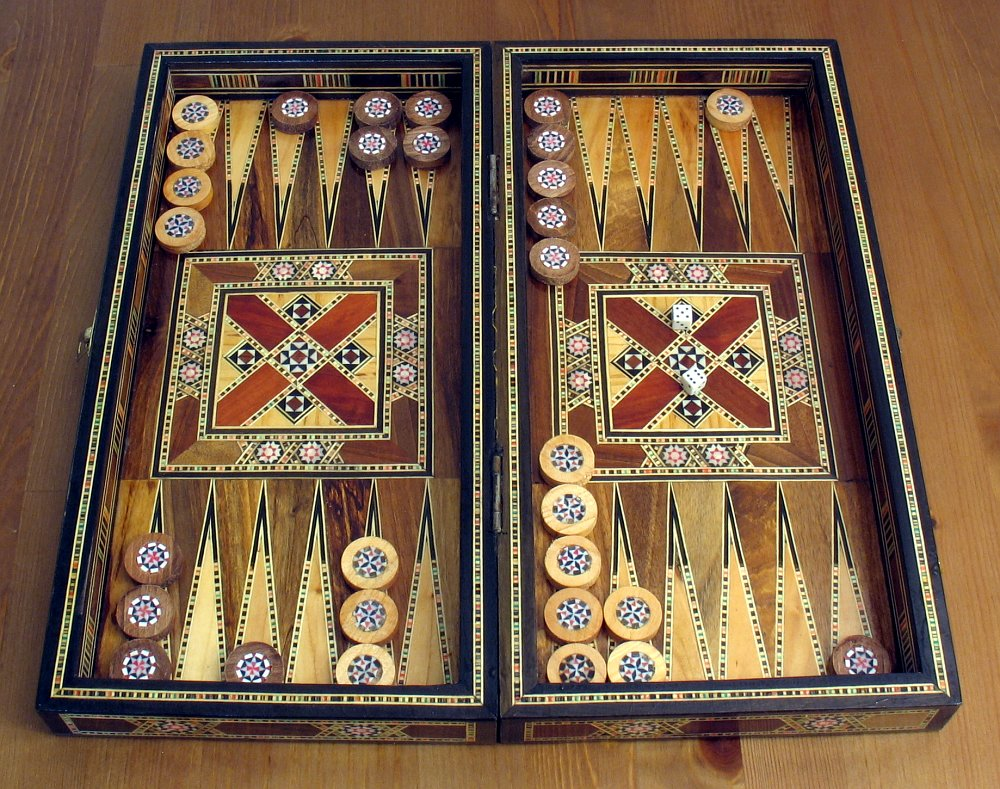
A backgammon board from Lebanon

Games are commonly classified along the chance/skill spectrum. Winning in chess is based entirely on skill, while in Candy Land it is based entirely on luck. Most games are in between. Backgammon combines strategy with the chance of dice roll. Settlers of Catan offers several paths to victory, and players may switch strategies, increasing their perceived autonomy.

== Types ==
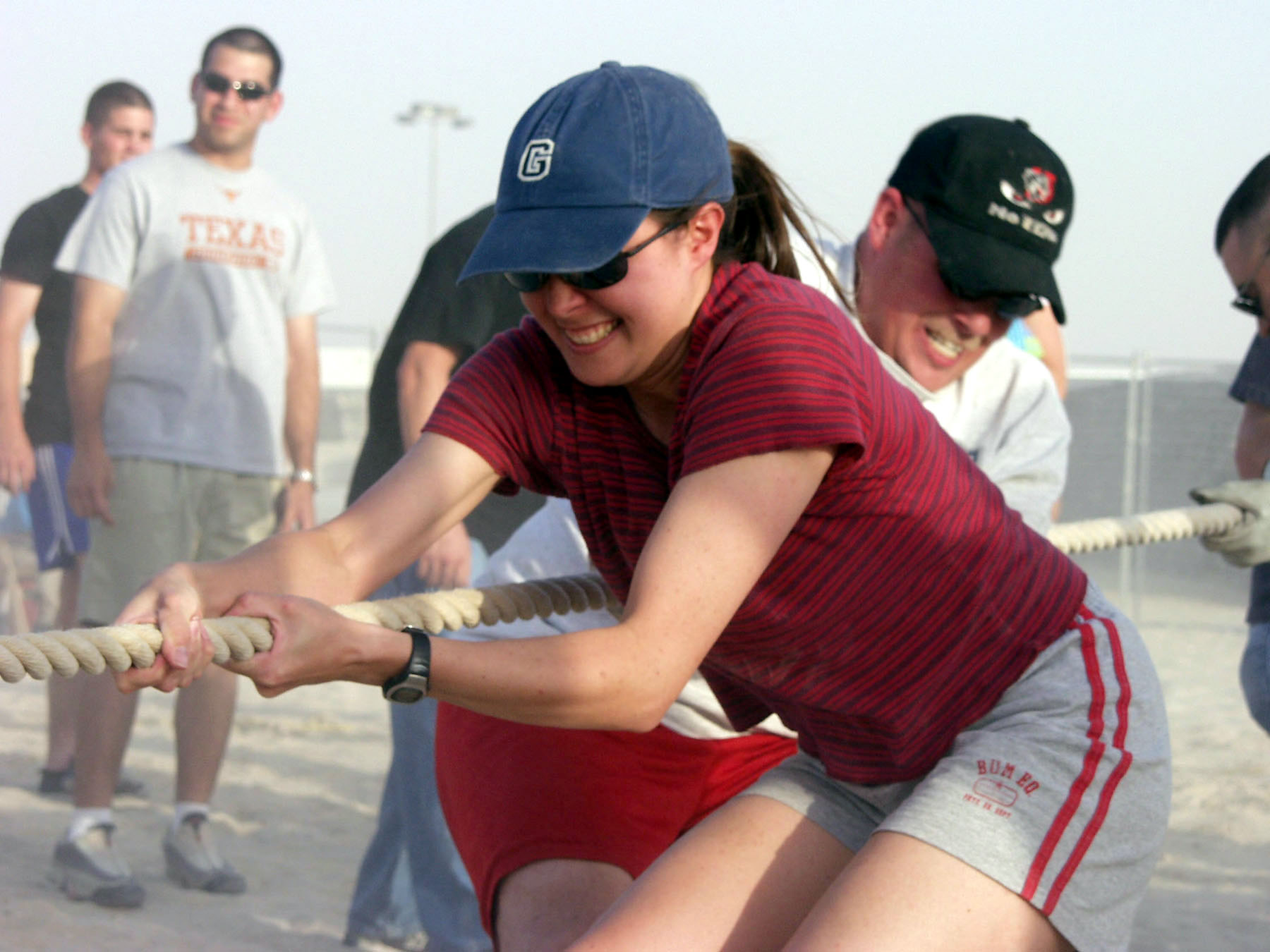
Tug of war is an easily organized, impromptu game that requires little equipment.

Games can take a variety of forms, from competitive sports to board games and video games.

=== Sports ===
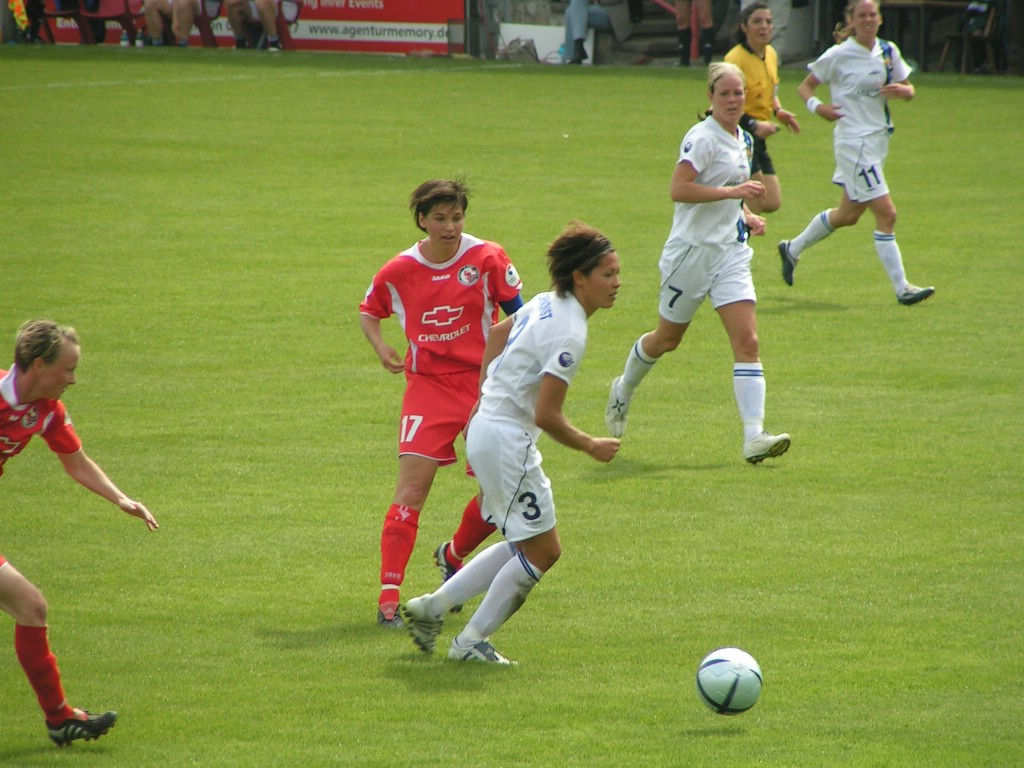
Association football is a popular sport worldwide.

Sports are competitive games involving physical skill with accepted rules. Many sports require special equipment and dedicated playing fields, leading to the involvement of a community much larger than the group of players. A city or town may set aside such resources for the organization of sports leagues. Association football (soccer) is the world's most popular sport by participation, with 250 million players in over 200 countries.

Spectator sports have been part of human culture for thousands of years. Local and national sports teams are arenas for group identity, promoting civic pride in the home team in municipal rivalries.

Lawn games spread in the late 19th century as outdoor recreation. Croquet, bocce, and boules provide leisurely competition and social interaction.

=== Tabletop games ===
Tabletop games are designed to be played on a table, including board games, card games, and dice games.

==== Board games ====
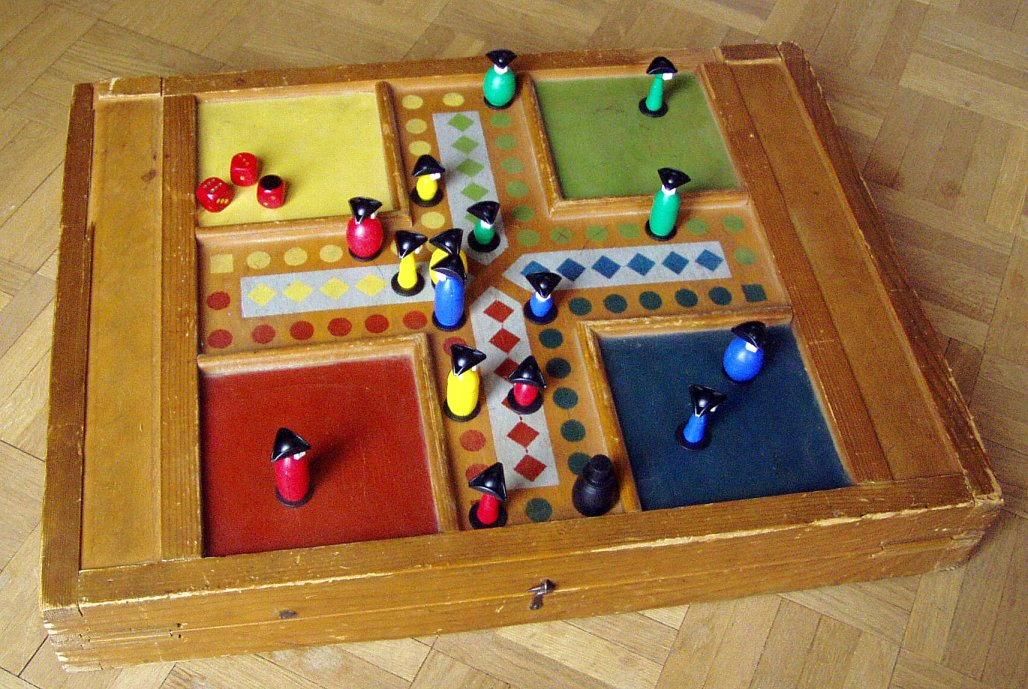
Parcheesi is an American adaptation of a Pachisi, originating in India.

Board games use as a central tool a board on which location, interactions, and choices are tracked. Abstract strategy games, such as chess and Go, are entirely determined by player moves not chance. Race games such as Parcheesi and backgammon incorporate dice rolls, while Settlers of Catan involves resource management, trading, and negotiating with other players.

Board games have grown more dynamic in the 21st century, with Eurogames emphasizing efficient resource management over direct conflict. Tens of thousands of tabletop games have launched on crowdfunding platform Kickstarter, with projects raising funds to pay for a game's production.

==== Card games ====
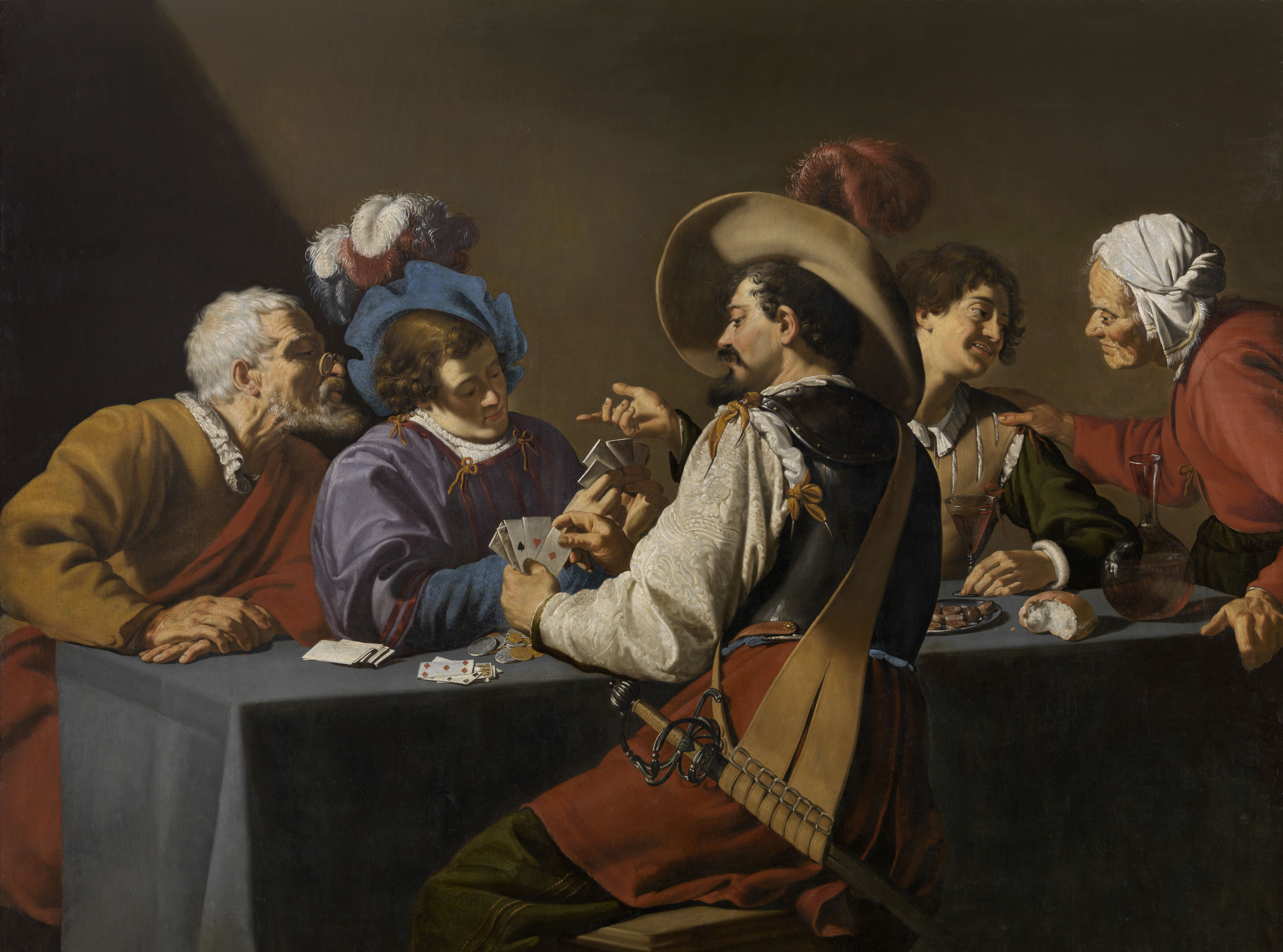
Playing Cards, by Theodoor Rombouts, 17th century

Card games use a deck of cards as their central tool. Standard 52-card decks support many varieties of games including trick-taking games such as bridge and whist. Uno was originally played with standard decks and has since been commercialized with customized decks. Variations of the standard deck exist across the world such as "French-suited" 32-card decks, tarot-derived 78-card decks, and Italian 40-card decks.

Collectible card games were pioneered by Magic: The Gathering in 1993, where players form decks and compete against others. The market has grown to $1.5 billion in 2021. Collectible card game booster packs are random, while living card game pack contents are known.

==== Dice games ====
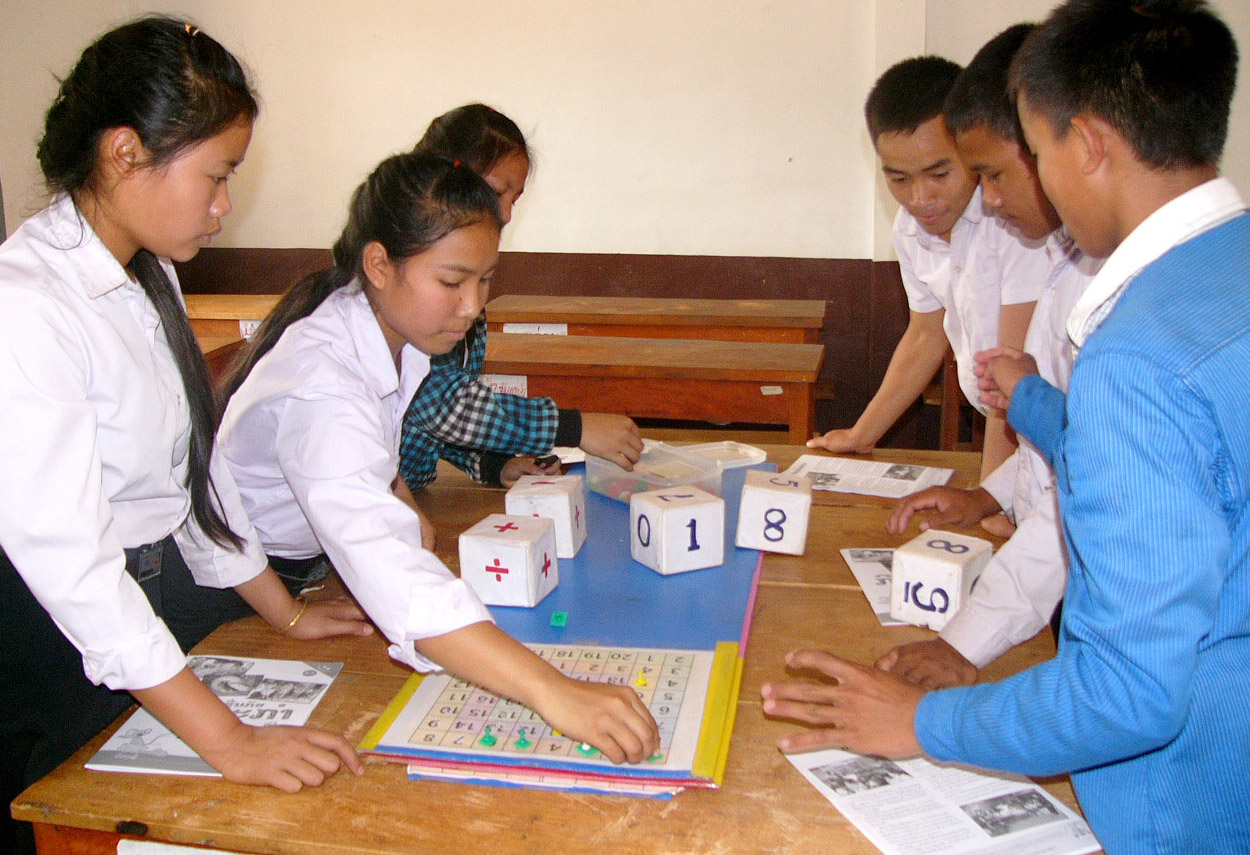
Students in Laos using dice to improve numeracy skills. They roll three dice, then use basic math operations to combine those into a new number which they cover on the board. The goal is to cover four squares in the row.

Dice games use randomized dice rolls as their central element. Examples include Yahtzee, Farkle, and craps. Dominoes, while tile-based rather than using dice, also uses draw-and-play mechanics.

=== Video games ===
Video games use electronic devices. Commercial video games were first available in the 1970s, though earlier games included Tennis for Two and Spacewar!. Video games are interactive and may have a game engine simulating complex physics and environments. Genres include action/shooter, fighting, and platform games.

Massively multiplayer online role-playing games can support thousands of players simultaneously within a virtual world. As of 2013, the MMORPG World of Warcraft had 36% market share. Esports give away millions of dollars in prize money while millions of viewers watch across the world.

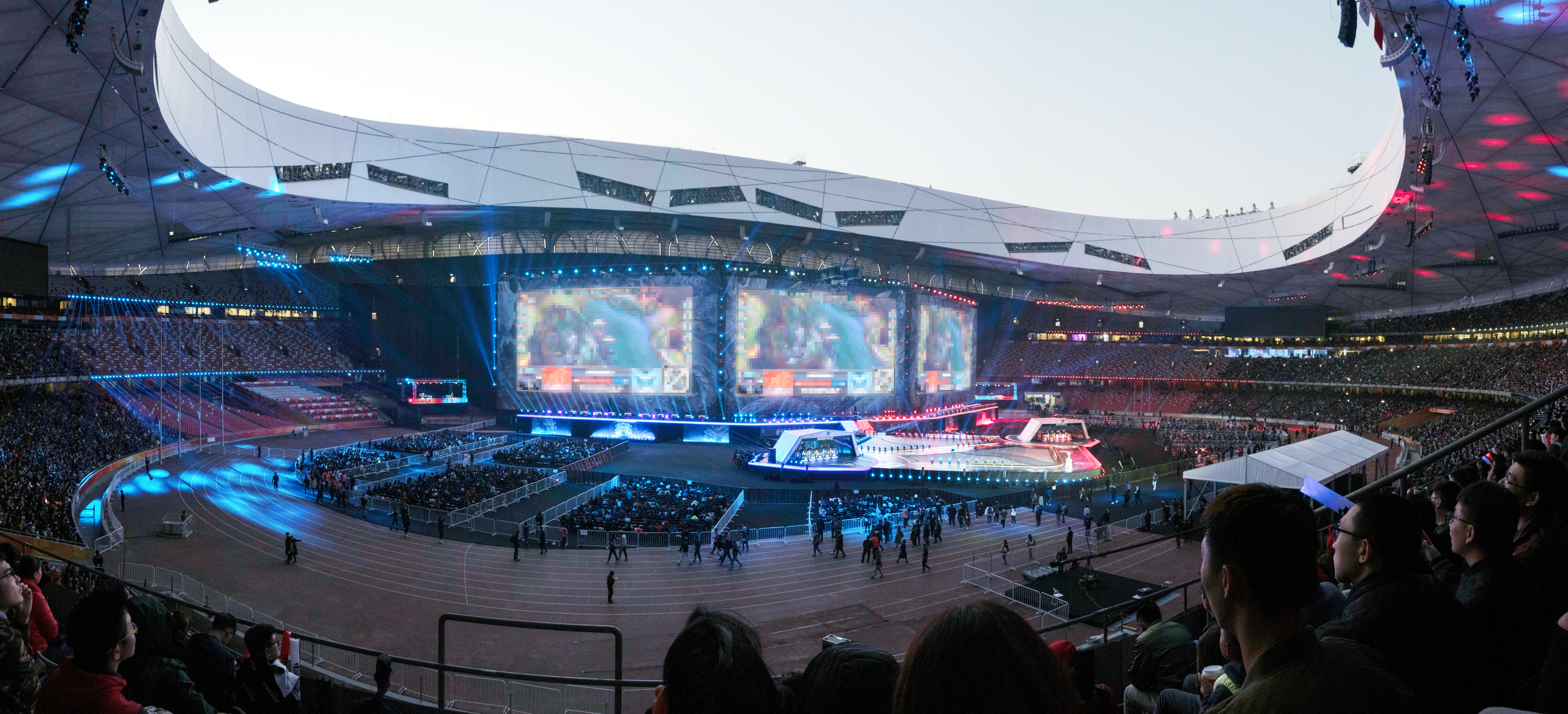
The stage for the 2017 League of Legends World Championship Finals in Beijing

=== Role-playing games ===
In role-playing games (RPGs), players enact fictional characters and collaboratively shape a narrative. Gary Gygax and Dave Arneson created the first RPG Dungeons & Dragons in 1974. Players make choices for their characters, with a dungeon master adjudicating things the rules don't cover.

Video game RPGs tend to run characters through a predetermined story line. Most Final Fantasy games present a fantasy/science fiction narrative with hero's journey, while Dark Souls is known for difficult action sequences.

== Games and society ==
=== Psychology of play ===
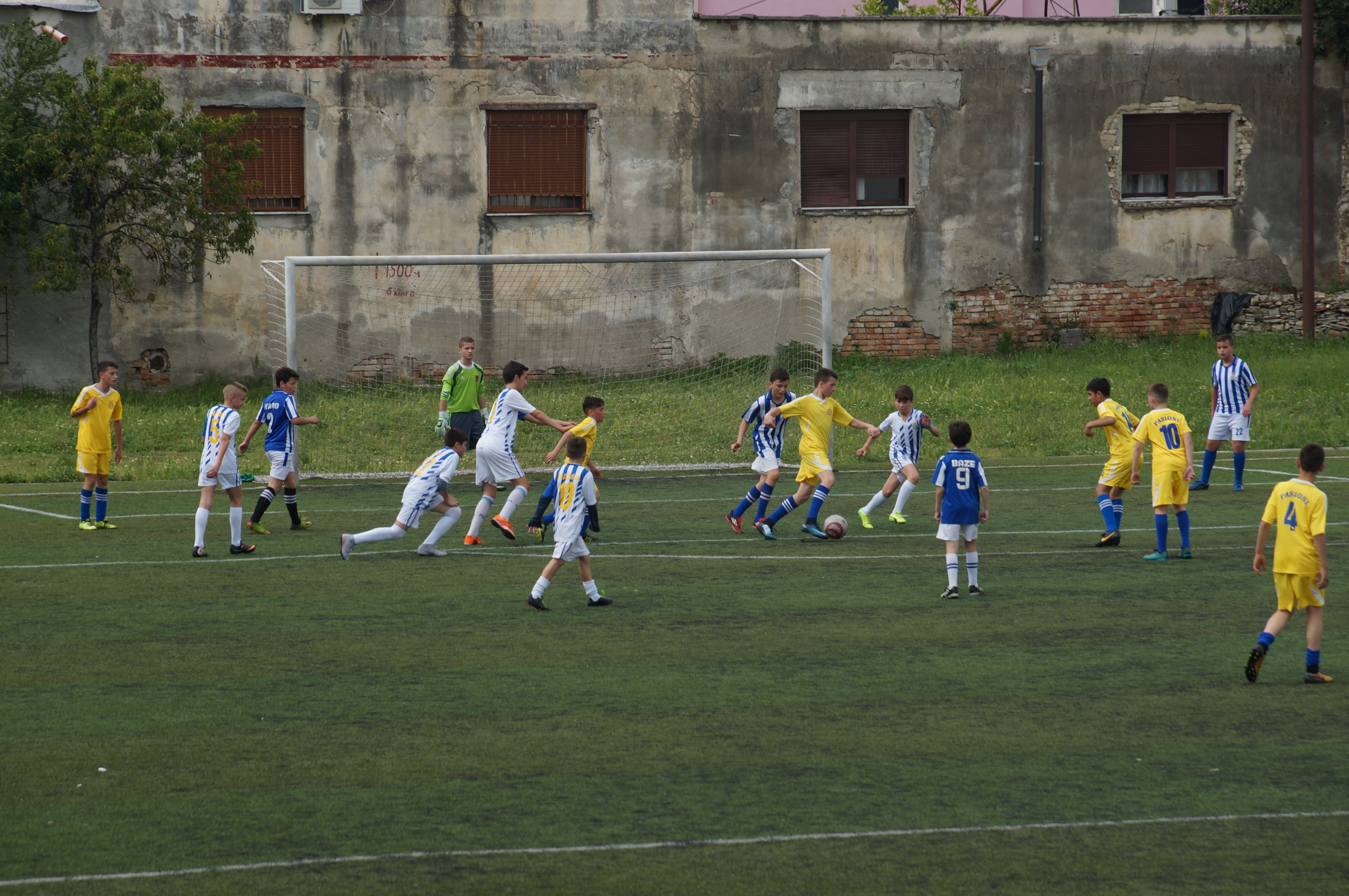
Boys playing soccer in Tirana, Albania

Psychologists have long recognized play as a fundamental developmental activity. Jean Piaget described play as a way to experiment with different cognitive schemas and assimilate experience. Lev Vygotsky emphasized play's effectiveness in communicative, narrative, and representational competence.

In adults, games serve a range of psychological functions. Mihaly Csikszentmihalyi called flow a state of intense concentration and total immersion which boosts life satisfaction. To help players achieve flow, games offer clear goals, immediate feedback, and balance challenge with skill.

Research into problematic gaming has grown alongside the video game industry. In 2019, the World Health Organization designated gaming disorder as a mental disorder, with effects such as health problems, sleep loss, and social isolation.

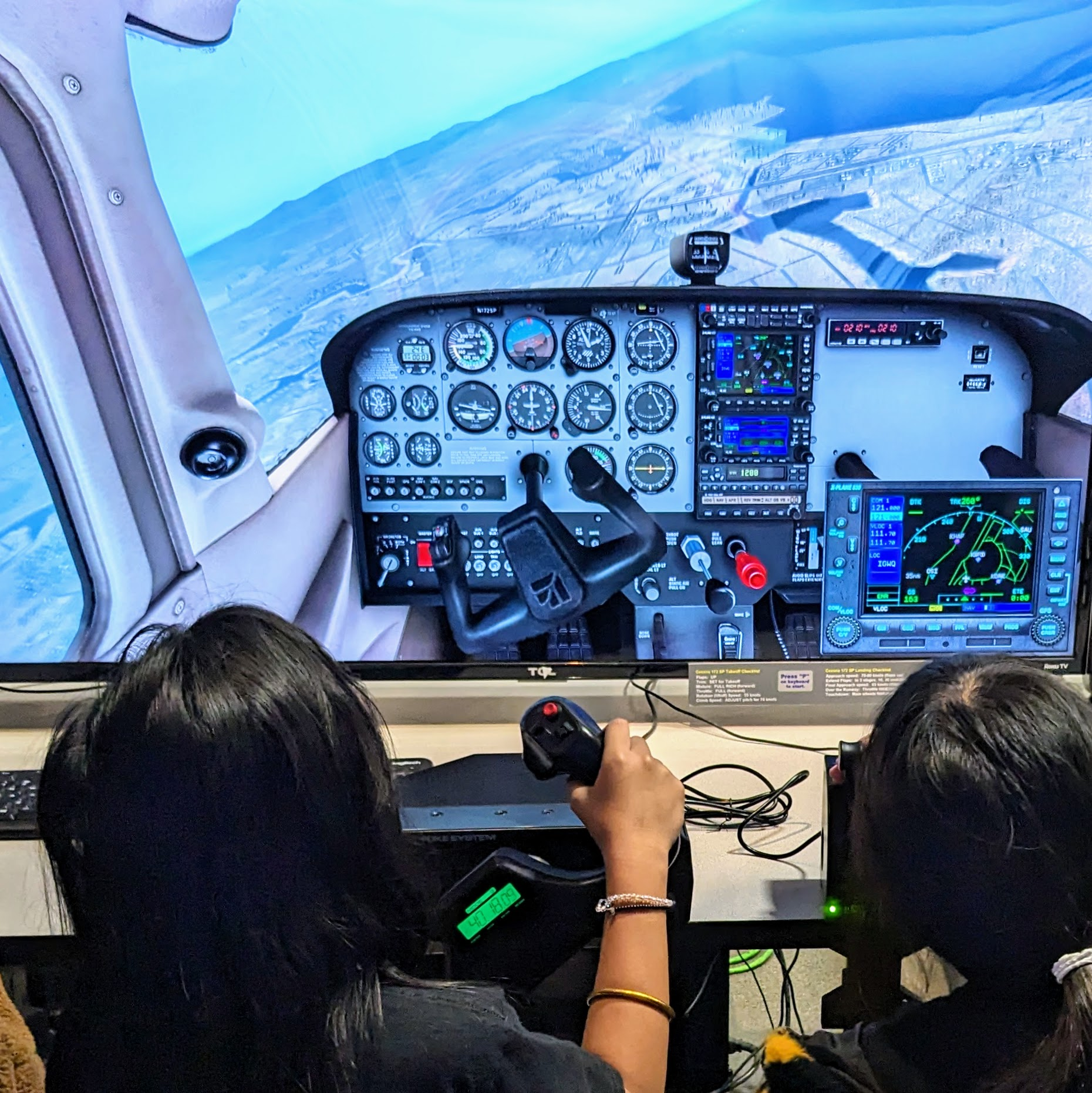
Visitors at a desktop flight simulator

=== Games as education ===
Serious games are designed for training, education, or health care rather than entertainment. Flight simulators are used for pilot training, mission rehearsal for military planners, and laparoscopic equipment simulators for surgery.

In formal education, game-based learning has received extensive research. Well-designed educational games can improve knowledge retention and deepen understanding.

=== Game theory ===
John Nash proved that games with several players have a stable solution provided that coalitions between players are disallowed. Nash won the Nobel Prize for economics for this important result which extended von Neumann's theory of zero-sum games. Nash's stable solution is known as the Nash equilibrium.

If cooperation between players is allowed, then the game becomes more complex; many concepts have been developed to analyze such games. Cooperative game theory uses coalition formation, joint actions, and payoffs for analysis.

In quantum game theory, it has been found that the introduction of quantum information into multiplayer games allows a new type of equilibrium strategy not found in traditional games. The entanglement of player's choices can have the effect of a contract by preventing players from profiting from what is known as betrayal. Games with many independent players are difficult to analyze formally using game theory as the players may form and switch coalitions.

== See also ==
- Game club – Association of people united by a common interest or goal
- Game mechanics – Construct, rule, or method designed for interaction with a game's state
- Gamer – Person who plays games
- Girls' games and toys
- History of games
- Learning through play – Concept in education and psychology
- List of games – Overview of and topical guide to games
- Ludeme – Basic unit of play
- Ludibrium – Latin word
- Ludology – Study of games and the act of playing them
- Ludomania – Harmful repetitive gambling
- Mobile game – Video game played on a mobile device
- N-player game – Game which can have any number of players
- Personal computer game – Video game for a personal computer
