= Lusory attitude =

Psychological attitude of game players

Lusory attitude is the psychological attitude required of a player entering into the play of a game. Adopting a lusory attitude is accepting the rules and ludemes of a game to facilitate the experience of play.

The term was coined by Bernard Suits in the book The Grasshopper: Games, Life and Utopia, first published in 1978, in which Suits defines the playing of a game as "the voluntary attempt to overcome unnecessary obstacles". He also offers a fuller definition:

"To play a game is to attempt to achieve a specific state of affairs [prelusory goal], using only means permitted by rules [lusory means], where the rules prohibit use of more efficient in favour of less efficient means [constitutive rules], and where the rules are accepted just because they make possible such activity [lusory attitude]."

For example, two individuals assume a lusory attitude in the board game chess when they aim to arrive at their goal, checkmating the opponent's king, through the accepted actions or ludemes of the game, voluntarily making the end goal more difficult in order to make the activity possible.

== Lusory Attitudes in Governed Play ==
Two players engaging in a lusory attitude by following the contrived rules of a game of chess.

An individual may also be considered to be playing a game in which the rules are necessarily forced, or accepted for reasons other than the sake of play. In a competitive environment, or a scenario like in Squid Game, the players not only follow the rules for the sake of the game but also for fear of disqualification or punishment due to an outside governing entity that constitutes and enforces the rules of play. The players or competitors of a governed activity may not necessarily have a lusory attitude, while the governing entity making the activity possible does. In this perspective, professional players, of games such as chess or golf, are not considered at play but are still playing the game by participating in the institution of the game.

However, a different perspective of professional players views them as at play, but not quite playing full stop, thus having less of a lusory attitude than previously suggested. The average player adopts the lusory attitude for a game entirely for the sake of playing the game, regardless of victory. Competitive players can be viewed as adopting a lusory attitude primarily for the sake of playing the game, as well as for the sake of victory, as long as victory is preferred but not required by the player. However, competitive players are still adopting a "less" lusory attitude because of the dialogue between playing a game for fun versus for victory that naturally occurs when playing a game with competition, thus winning, at the forefront.

== Magic Circle and Lusory Communities ==
A lusory community is what is created when players engage in a lusory attitude during play, which causes them to create a safe space to continue both the escapism of play and the continuation of the lusory attitudes of the players. Lusory communities are a concept that builds upon both Suits' concept of lusory attitudes and Johan Huizinga's concept of the Magic Circle, as it brings both separation of the normal world from the play experience, with the agreement upon contrived set of rules.

== See also ==
- Magic Circle (virtual worlds)
