= Straylight =

Straylight may refer to:

- Stray light, unintended light in an optical system
  - Ocular straylight, stray light produced in the human eye
- The Villa Straylight in William Gibson's 1984 cyberpunk novel Neuromancer
- Straylight Productions, a team of video game music composers and producers
- Straylight Studios, a game development studio
- Straylight Run, an American rock band
