= Bernard Suits =

Philosopher of games (1925–2007)

- Born: Bernard Herbert Suits; 1925; Detroit, Michigan, U.S.
- Died: 2007 (aged 81–82)

Education
- Education: University of Illinois

Philosophical work
- Era: Contemporary philosophy
- Region: Western philosophy
- School: Analytic philosophy
- Institutions: University of Waterloo
- Main interests: Philosophy of sport, philosophy of games, value theory, utopianism
- Notable works: The Grasshopper: Games, Life and Utopia (1978)
- Notable ideas: Definition of game-playing as "the voluntary attempt to overcome unnecessary obstacles"; lusory attitude; prelusory goal

Bernard Herbert Suits (November 25, 1925 – February 5, 2007) was an American-Canadian philosopher and professor emeritus of Philosophy at the University of Waterloo. He is widely recognized for his foundational contributions to the philosophy of action, the philosophy of sport, and game studies (ludology). He is best known for The Grasshopper: Games, Life and Utopia (1978), a philosophical dialogue in which he provided a formal definition of game-playing and argues that playing games is the highest human good. Challenging Ludwig Wittgenstein’s famous assertion that games cannot be systematically defined, Suits defined game-playing as "the voluntary attempt to overcome unnecessary obstacles."

He also offers a fuller definition:

"To play a game is to attempt to achieve a specific state of affairs [prelusory goal], using only means permitted by rules [lusory means], where the rules prohibit use of more efficient in favour of less efficient means [constitutive rules], and where the rules are accepted just because they make possible such activity [lusory attitude]."

== Selected works ==
- The Grasshopper: Games, Life and Utopia (1978)
- Return of the Grasshopper: Games, Leisure and the Good Life in the Third Millennium (2022)

== See also ==
- Lusory attitude
- Philosophy of sport
- Game studies
- Homo Ludens
- Magic circle (games)
