= Straylight Studios =

- Company type: Privately Owned
- Industry: Video games
- Founded: March 2004
- Defunct: March 2009
- Headquarters: Dunedin, New Zealand
- Key people: Timothy Nixon, CEO
- Website: www.straylight-studios.com/

Straylight Studios was a game development studio based in Dunedin, New Zealand, active from March 2004 to March 2009.

Straylight's focus was on the application of "meaningful play", a term coined by CEO Timothy Nixon to describe play that borrows from serious Games and casual Games to produce an entertaining and meaningful (if not strictly "educational") experience.

From 2007, Straylight was located in the Central Business District of Dunedin. Prior to that, it was in the Centre for Innovation research facility at the University of Otago.

Early in 2008, Nixon launched his Meaningful Play blog to promote and encourage discussion about the application of gaming technology as a learning tool.

== Industry awards ==
Straylight received an award at TUANZ, 2005.

- Winner: TUANZ Entertainment Award for StarTag
- Finalist: Computerworld Excellence Awards, Innovation in IT for The Kitchen

== Games developed ==
- The Kitchen
- StarTag
