= Game mechanics =

Construct, rule, or method designed for interaction with a game's state

In tabletop games and video games, game mechanics define how a game works for players. Game mechanics are the rules or ludemes that govern and guide player actions, as well as the game's response to them. A rule is an instruction on how to play, while a ludeme is an element of play, such as the L-shaped move of the knight in chess. The interplay of various mechanics determines the game's complexity and how the players interact with the game. All games use game mechanics; however, different theories disagree about their degree of importance to a game. The process and study of game design includes efforts to develop game mechanics that engage players.

Common examples of game mechanics include turn-taking, movement of tokens, set collection, bidding, capture, and resource management (like spell slots).

== Definition of term ==
There is no consensus on the precise definition of game mechanics. Competing definitions claim that game mechanics are:

- "systems of interactions between the player and the game"
- "the rules and procedures that guide the player and the game response to the player's moves or actions"
- "more than what the player may recognize, they are only those things that impact the play experience"
- "methods invoked by agents for interacting with the game world."

=== Game mechanics vs. theme ===
A game's mechanics are not its theme. Some games have a theme—some element of representation. For example, in Monopoly, the events of the game represent another activity, the buying and selling of properties. Two games that are mechanically similar can be thematically different, and vice versa. The tension between a game's mechanics and theme is ludonarrative dissonance.

Abstract games do not have themes, because the action is not intended to represent anything. Go is an example of an abstract game.

=== Game mechanics vs. gameplay ===
Some game studies scholars distinguish between game mechanics and gameplay. In Playability and Player Experience Research, the authors define gameplay as "the interactive gaming process of the player with the game." In this definition, gameplay occurs when players interact with the game mechanics. Similarly, in Dissecting Play – Investigating the Cognitive and Emotional Motivations and Affects of Computer Gameplay, the authors define gameplay as "interacting with a game design in the performance of cognitive tasks". Video games researcher Carlo Fabricatore defines gameplay as:

- What the player can do
- What other entities can do, in response to player's actions.

In Ernest Adams and Andrew Rollings on game design, the authors define gameplay as the combination and interaction of many elements of a game.

However, popular usage sometimes elides the two terms. For example, gamedesigning.org defines gameplay as the core game mechanics that determine a game's overall characteristics.

Compound Mechanics are groups of related mechanics that work together to create a larger gameplay experience. An example of this can be when playing a driving game. All the components that make up driving a car work well with each other and further enhance that experience for the player.

=== Categorization ===
Scholars organize game mechanics into categories, which they use (along with theme and gameplay) to classify games. For example, in Building Blocks of Tabletop Game Design, Geoffrey Engelstein and Isaac Shalev classify game mechanisms into categories based on game structure, turn order, actions, resolution, victory conditions, uncertainty, economics, auctions, worker placement, movement, area control, set collection, and card mechanisms.

=== Game Mechanics in serious games ===
Serious games are designed for purposes beyond just entertainment, such as education and training. Their mechanics can be connected to specific learning objectives. Game researcher Arnab and his colleagues developed the Learning Mechanics Game Mechanics (LM-MG) model to analyze how gameplay mechanics relate to educational activities. The model helps researchers and designers identify how the learning and entertainment pieces of a game work together.

== Examples of game mechanics ==
The following examples of game mechanics are not a strict or complete taxonomy. This list is alphabetical.

=== Action points ===
Each player receives a budget of action points to use on each turn. These points may be spent on various actions according to the game rules, such as moving pieces, drawing cards, collecting money, etc.

=== Alignment ===
Alignment is a game mechanism in both tabletop role-playing games and role-playing video games. Alignment represents characters' moral and ethical orientation, such as good or evil. In some games, a player character's alignment permits or prohibits the use of additional game mechanics. For example, in Shin Megami Tensei: Strange Journey Redux, alignment determines which demon assistants a player can or cannot recruit, and in Star Wars Knights of the Old Republic II: The Sith Lords, players aligned with the light and dark sides of The Force gain different bonuses to attacks, healing, and speed.

=== Auction or bidding ===
Some games use an auction or bidding system in which the players make competitive bids to determine which player wins the right to perform particular actions. Such an auction can be based on different forms of payment:

- The winning bidder must pay for the won privilege with some form of game resource (game money, points, etc.). For example, Ra uses this mechanic.
- The auction is a form of a promise that the winner will achieve some outcome in the near future. If this outcome is not achieved, the bidder pays a penalty. Such a system is used in many trick-taking games, such as contract bridge.

=== Capture/eliminate ===
A piece being captured in the game Sidjah

In some games, the number of tokens a player has on the playing surface represents their current strength in the game. A central goal is capturing an opponent's tokens, which removes them from the playing surface.

Captures can be achieved in a number of ways:

- Moving one of one's own tokens into a space occupied by an opposing token (e.g. chess, parchisi), also known as a replacement capture or displacement capture.
  - If the space immediately opposite must either be off the board or a marked trap space, it is known as a push capture.
- Jumping a token over the space immediately occupied by an opposing token (e.g. draughts), known as a jump or leap.
  - When the opposing token can be any distance along an unobstructed line, it is known as a flying capture.
- Occupying the adjacent squares of an opposing token (e.g. tafl), also known as a custodian capture, custodianship or interception.
- Occupying one immediately adjacent square to an opposing token, also known as approach.
- The reverse of approach: capturing an adjacent opposing token by moving away from it in a straight line (e.g. fanorona), also known as withdrawal.
- Capturing two opposing tokens by occupying the single square separating them, also known as intervention.
- Declaring an "attack" on an opposing token, and then determining the outcome of the attack, either in a deterministic way by the game rules (e.g. Stratego, Illuminati), or by using a randomizing method (e.g. Illuminati: New World Order).
- Surrounding a token or region with one's own tokens in some manner (e.g. go), also known as enclosure.
- Playing cards or other game resources to capture tokens.
- Other specialized mechanisms that do not fall neatly into any of the above categories.

In some games, captured tokens are simply removed and play no further part in the game (e.g. chess). In others, captured tokens are removed but can return to play later in the game under various rules (e.g. backgammon, pachisi). Some games allow the capturing player to take possession of the captured tokens and use them later in the game (e.g. Shogi, Reversi, Illuminati), also known as conversion.

Many video games express the capture mechanism in the form of a kill count (sometimes referred to as "frags"), reflecting the number of opposing pawns eliminated during the game.

=== Chance and randomization ===
==== Dice ====
The most common use of dice is to randomly determine the outcome of an interaction in a game. An example is a player rolling a die or dice to determine how many board spaces to move a game token.

Dice often determine the outcomes of in-game conflict between players, with different outcomes of the die/dice roll of different benefit (or adverse effect) to each player involved. This occurs in games that simulate direct conflicts of interest.

Different dice formulas are used to generate different probability curves. A single die has equal probability of landing on any particular side, and consequently produces a linear probability distribution curve. The sum of two or more dice, however, results in a bell curve-shaped probability distribution, with the addition of further dice resulting in a steeper bell curve, decreasing the likelihood of an extreme result. A linear curve is generally perceived by players as being more "swingy", whereas a bell curve is perceived as being more "fair".

==== Loot Box ====
A Loot Box (also called a loot crate or prize crate) provide players with randomly-allocated items, characters, cards, or in-game materials, often aiding the player. Generally, these rewards have different tiers of rarity associated with them, with the rarer rewards benefitting the player more than the common ones. In the mobile game, Clash of Clans, when opening Chests (their name for Loot Box), players have a 58% chance of receiving common rewards, a 32% chance of receiving Rare rewards, a 8% chance of receiving Epic rewards, and a 2% chance of receiving Legendary rewards.

==== Risk and reward ====
Some games include situations where players can "press their luck" in optional actions where the danger of a risk must be weighed against the chance of reward. For example, in Beowulf: The Legend, players may elect to take a "Risk", with success yielding cards and failure weakening the player's ultimate chance of victory.

=== Crafting ===
Crafting new in-game items is a game mechanism in open world survival video games such as Minecraft and Palworld, role-playing video games such as Divinity: Original Sin and Stardew Valley, tabletop role-playing games such as Dungeons & Dragons, and deck-building card games such as Mystic Vale. Crafting mechanics rely on set collection mechanics, since crafting new items requires obtaining specific sets of items, then transforming them into new ones.

=== Engine building ===
Engine building is a mechanism that involves building and optimizing a system to create a flow of resources. SimCity is an example of an engine-building video game: money activates building mechanisms, which in turn unlock feedback loops between many internal resources such as people, job vacancies, power, transport capacity, and zone types. In engine-building board games, the player adds and modifies combinations of abilities or resources to assemble a virtuous circle of increasingly powerful and productive outcomes.

=== Modes ===
A game mode is a distinct configuration that varies gameplay and affects how other game mechanics behave. A game with several modes presents different settings in each, changing how a particular element of the game is played.

A common example is the choice between single-player and multiplayer modes in video games, where multiplayer can further be cooperative or competitive. A sandbox mode allows free play without predefined goals. In a Time Attack Mode, the player tries to score, progress or clear levels in a limited amount of time.

Changing modes while the game is in progress can increase difficulty and provide additional challenge or reward player success. Power-ups are modes that last for a few moments or that change only one or a few game rules. For example, power pellets in Pac-Man give the player a temporary ability to eat enemies.

A game mode may restrict or change the behavior of the available tools, such as allowing play with limited/unlimited ammo, new weapons, obstacles or enemies, or a timer, etc. A mode may establish different rules and game mechanics, such as altered gravity, win at first touch in a fighting game, or play with some cards face-up in a poker game. A mode may even change a game's overarching goals, such as following a story or character's career vs. playing a limited deathmatch or capture the flag set.

=== Movement ===
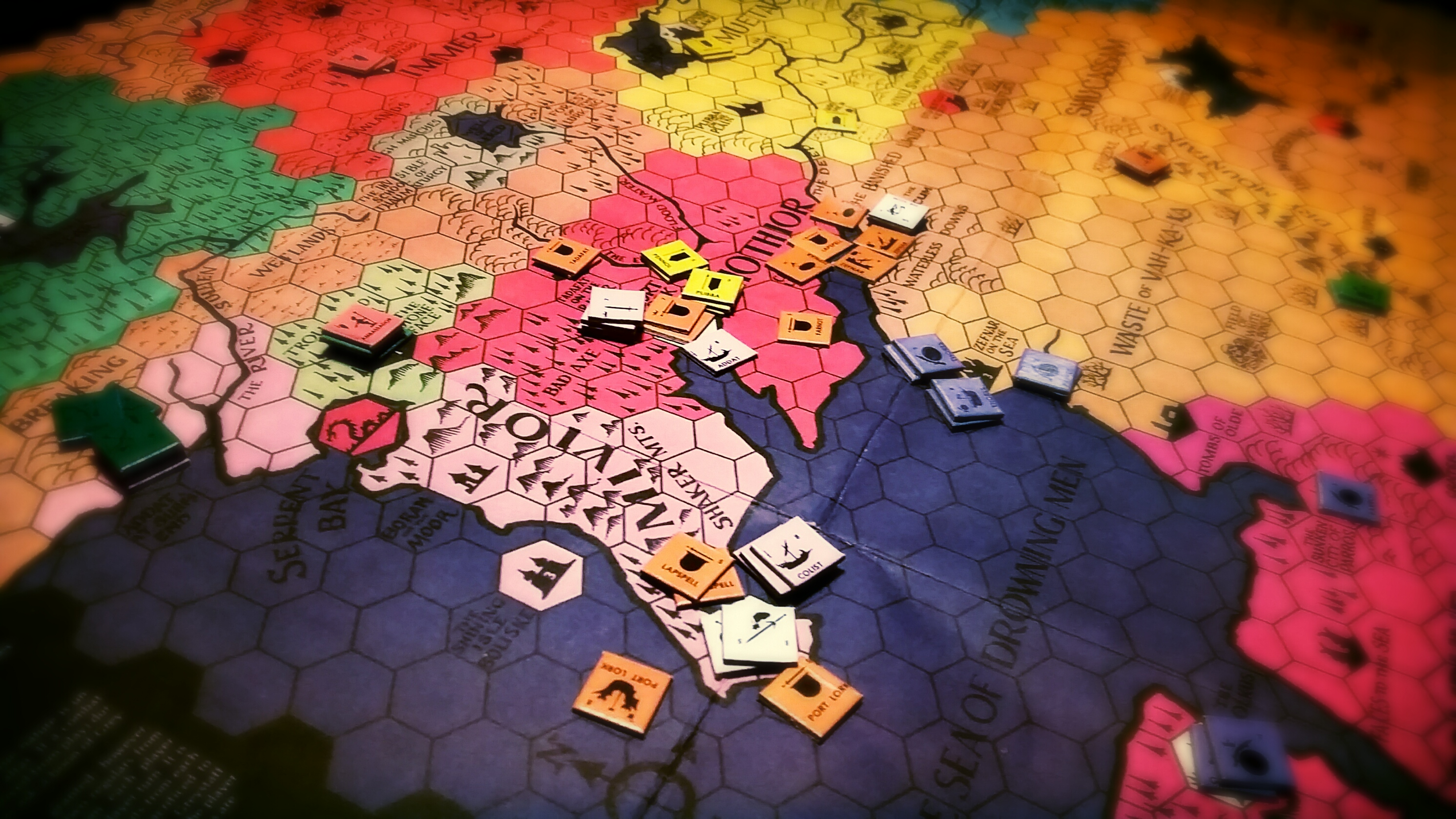
The hexagonal board of Divine Right

Many board games involve the movement of tokens. Movement mechanics govern how and when these tokens are allowed to move.

Some game boards are divided into small, equally-sized areas that can be occupied by game tokens. (Often such areas are called squares, even if not square in shape.) Movement rules specify how and when a token can be moved to another area. For example, a player may be allowed to move a token to an adjacent area, but not one further away. Dice are sometimes used to randomize the allowable movements. Other games, such as miniatures games, are played on surfaces with no marked areas.

=== Resource management ===
Many games involve the management of resources. Examples of game resources include tokens, money, land, natural resources, human resources and game points. Players establish relative values for various types of available resources, in the context of the current state of the game and the desired outcome (i.e. winning the game). Game rules determine how players can increase, spend, or exchange resources. The skillful management of resources lets players influence the game's outcome.

=== Tile-laying ===
Many games use tiles - flat, rigid pieces of a regular shape - that can be laid down on a flat surface to form a tessellation. Usually, such tiles have patterns or symbols on their surfaces that combine when tessellated to form game-mechanically significant combinations.

The tiles themselves are often drawn at random by the players, either immediately before placing them on the playing surface, or in groups to form a pool or hand of tiles from which the player may select one to play.

Tiles can be used in two distinct ways:

- The playing of a tile itself is directly significant to the outcome of the game, in that where and when it is played contributes points or resources to the player.
- Tiles are used to build a board upon which other game tokens are placed, and the interaction of those tokens with the tiles provides game points or resources.

Examples of tile mechanics include: Scrabble, in which players lay down lettered tiles to form words and score points, and Tikal, in which players lay jungle tiles on the play surface then move tokens through them to score points.

=== Turns ===
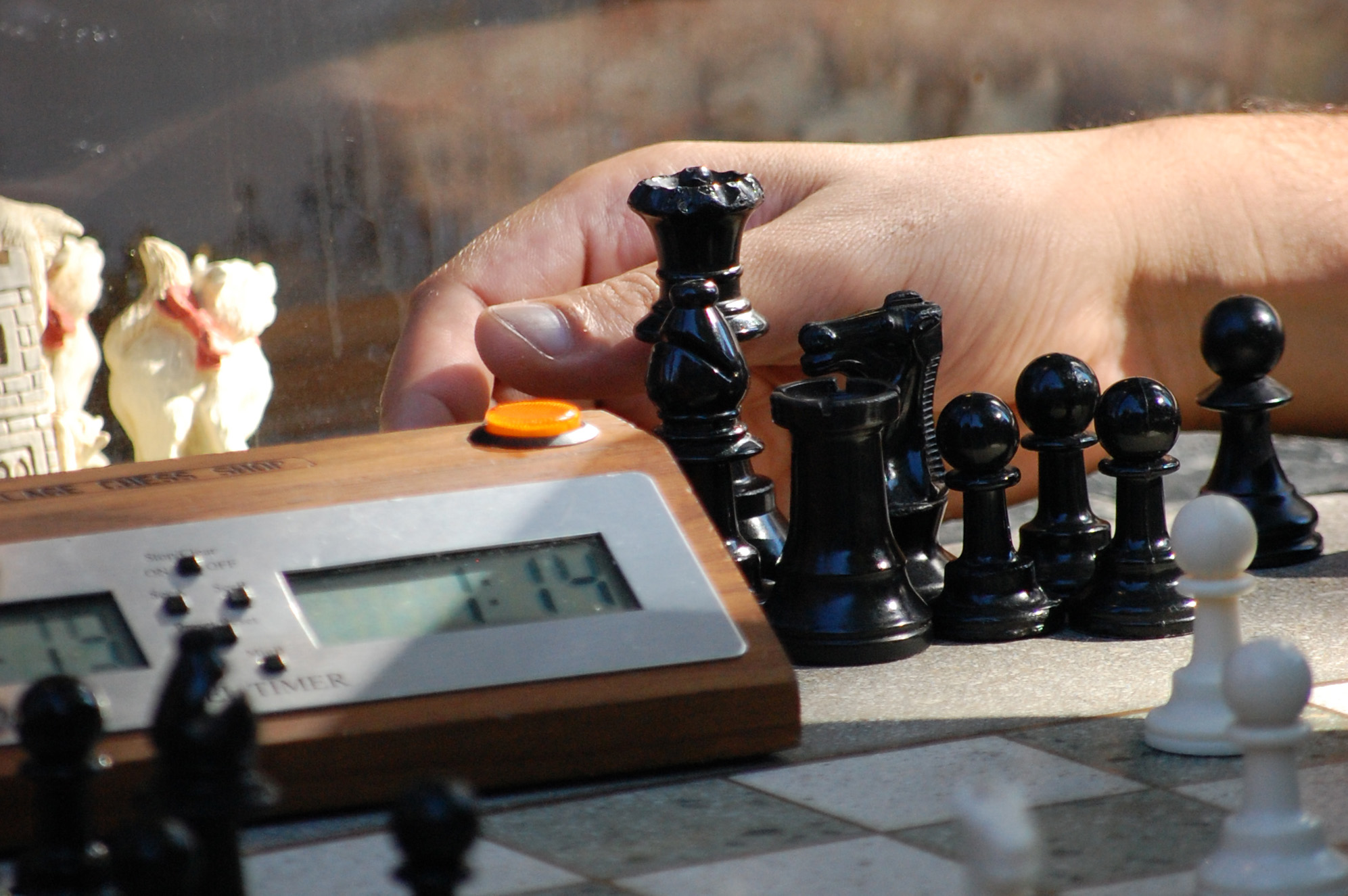
A chess clock can be used to measure and limit the time taken by each player in a turn-based game.

A turn is a segment of a game set aside for certain actions to happen before moving on to the next turn, where the sequence of events can largely repeat. Monopoly and chess use player turns where one player performs their actions before another player can. Some games like Rock-Paper-Scissors and the card game War use simultaneous game turns, where all players contribute to the actions of a single turn. Designers aren't forced to choose one turn style or the other, as Civilization uses a series of player turns followed by a trading round in which all players participate, combining player and simultaneous game turns.

Games with semi-simultaneous turns allow for some actions on another player's turn. Often times, this is a reaction to certain actions the other players make. In Unstable Unicorns, players may negate an opposing players last action with a specific card. (The "Neigh" card)

=== Victory conditions ===
Victory conditions control how a player wins the game. In many games, victory is achieved by a player who accumulates a sufficiently high score, or a higher score than any other player. Other examples of victory conditions include the necessity of completing a quest in a role-playing video game, or the player being suitably trained in a skill in a business game. Some games also feature a losing condition, such as being checkmated in chess, or being tagged in tag. In such a game, the winner is the only remaining player to have avoided loss. Games are not limited to one victory or loss condition, and can combine several at once. Tabletop role-playing games and sandbox games frequently have no victory condition.

==== Catch-up ====
Some games include a mechanism designed to make progress towards victory more difficult for players in the lead. The idea behind this is to allow trailing players a chance to catch up and potentially still win the game, rather than suffer an inevitable loss once they fall behind. For example, in The Settlers of Catan, a neutral piece (the robber) debilitates the resource generation of players whose territories it is near. Players occasionally get to move the robber, and frequently choose to position it where it will cause maximal disruption to the player currently winning the game. In some racing games, such as Chutes and Ladders, a player must roll or spin the exact number needed to reach the finish line; e.g., if a player is only four spaces from the finish line then they must roll a four on the die or land on the four with the spinner. If more than four is rolled, then the turn is forfeited to the next player.

=== Worker placement ===
Worker placement is a game mechanism where players allocate a limited number of tokens ("workers") to multiple stations that provide various defined actions. The worker placement mechanism originates with board games. Stewart Woods identifies Keydom (1998; later remade and updated as Aladdin's Dragons) as the first game to implement the mechanic. Worker placement was popularized by Caylus (2005) and became a staple of the Eurogame genre in the wake of the game's success. Other popular board games that use this mechanism include Stone Age and Agricola. Although the mechanism is chiefly associated with board games, the worker placement concept has been used in analysis of other game types. For instance, Adams and Dormans describe the assigning of tasks to SCV units in the real-time strategy game StarCraft as an example of the worker placement mechanic.

== See also ==
- Ludology
- Ludeme
- Chess clock
- Kingmaker scenario
- Pie rule
- Gamification
- Dynamic game difficulty balancing
