= Meaningful play =

Intentional actions or activities

Meaningful play are actions or activities built with either a designed or inherent intent, such as data collection or therapy.

Meaning is defined as the underlying purpose of the topic or subject at hand, while play itself is defined as a range of voluntary, intrinsically motivated activities normally associated with pleasure and enjoyment.

Inherent meaningful play would be defined as an activity where the purpose is built directly into the activity. An example of this is that sports have the inherent meaning of being fun and full of physical activity to promote wellness.

Designed meaningful play is defined as an activity where another purpose is also integrated into the activity, by the creator of the activity, to either acquire knowledge or promote another purpose within the activity. For example, games in developmental psychology have the designed meaning of gathering data about many functions such as how executive function develops. The designed meaning does not have to be built into the activity from the beginning. In considering recess, it was created to give children time to exercise and socialize, but researchers at a later time have inferred meaning from the activities that children participate in during this time, adding a designed meaning to the activity of recess.

== Overview ==
Meaningful play is discussed in the disciplines of psychology, education, counselling and law. It is also utilized in the fields of video games. While there appears to be no exact moment when the term was created, it first started to appear in the field of video games with the book Rules of Play, and was further adapted into other fields such as psychology soon after with a modified definition.

Meaningful play has grown and become more influential over the years. As researchers discovered many of the various uses for play (For example, cleaning up excess brain cells during play) as well as discovered how many various forms of play there are. Advocates of meaningful play and play in general have even voiced their recommendation that playing be placed above testing in young grades like kindergarten. As well there are studies branching out to different age groups seeing if meaningful play can help the elderly with cognitive and physical functioning.

While all play can be considered meaningful due to the inherent nature of play to have some sort of meaning of either competition or enjoyment, meaningful play is also about the designed meaning taken from play.

== Psychology ==
The field of psychology uses meaningful play in a large variety of ways. The most important way is for gathering data during research, especially with children. This is considered basic research because it is done with the sole intent of gathering knowledge which could eventually be applied. Other ways include playing (in the form of games or role-playing) during therapy.

=== Improving Basic Research ===
The experimental approach works quite well for the most common research participant (University undergraduate students) but for children it can be more difficult to keep them interested in the task which allows more room for noise. This is due to the fact that children can become bored very quickly with normal testing methods. Researchers, using meaningful play, can build experiments using various playful techniques so that the experimental method is fun and interactive for children, and at the same time gathers data correctly for the concept.

An example of an experiment designed to be as simple as possible for gathering data would be the Ainsworth Strange Situation task. However looking at a task that incorporates meaningful play, such as the switch task for children which incorporated a story for motivation to the children, interactions which the children could enjoy (such as finding treasure) created the sense that the children were helping the characters accomplish a goal. Even though it was presented as a game, the researchers were able to collect all the data required.

Meaningful play, for use in data collection, has been used across almost every age group, from hide and seek games with infants, to block puzzles with children, to virtual reality games with young adults.

Meaningful play goes even further than just humans and can also be used to train animals. In the psychology, meaningful play is used for extracting data from animals who are unable to verbally give us the meaning behind their actions.

In university settings, environmental enrichment boxes for pigeons, mice, and other animals have the inherent meaning of allowing them exercise and mental stimulation. This follows from the designed meaning of the enrichment boxes to keep the animals at mental peak and closer to a natural environment. The boxes are created to achieve this goal by following several strict guidelines.

Meaningful play is a bit more difficult because on animals with lower cognitive skills (like pigeons) it is hard to actual create a game for them to play, yet researchers have used techniques such as operant boxes to make it more interactive and motivating.

=== Therapy ===
Meaningful play, in the form of play therapy, has been used to help children and adults. It can involve various methods from using dolls to role-playing, all of which help to bring the participant into a state of mind where they feel comfortable discussing or overcoming the problem they are experiencing.

When participants of this kind of therapy use playing, in any form, it helps them to overcome whatever is causing their negative state in a safe and secure environment. They are also able to detach themselves and push their emotions and states onto the role they are taking or the dolls they are using.

Critics argue play therapy because it can also be seen as a form of temporary regression where adults act like children, playing games to overcome problems. While there are notable cases of regression in adults and even children regressing further, there has been no link made of any sort between play therapy and regression in a negative way.

== Video games ==
Video games are an example of designed meaning. They draw the player into the designed world and from that point, the player finds their own meaning either by following the designers intents or making their own. An example of games like this can range from Pong to The Elder Scrolls V: Skyrim.

In Rules of Play, Katie Salen and Eric Zimmerman introduce meaningful play as the goal of successful game design. They offer two definitions, one descriptive and one evaluative:

Descriptive definition: "Meaningful play in a game emerges from the relationship between player action and system outcome; it is the process by which a player takes action within the designed system of a game and the system responds to the action. The meaning of an action in a game resides in the relationship between action and outcome". This is a cause-and-effect definition, for example if you press a lever and a door opens, the descriptive definition is that pressing that certain lever causes that exact door to open.

Evaluative definition: "Meaningful play is what occurs when the relationships between actions and outcomes in a game are both discernable and integrated into the larger context of the game". This definition has to be looked at from a wider viewpoint where the actual actions that the player takes are analyzed. It asks the question of why the player takes the actions that he does and what meaning his actions have over the entire course of the game.

These can be broken down into the original components of meaningful play, where descriptive is inherent, and evaluative is the designed meaning of the game. With meaningful play in games being based on designing a successful game, it can be difficult to evaluate what is a successful game. Examples of very successful games that had success in non-intended ways are provided.

Both evaluative and descriptive definitions have been studied extensively in the online genre of games. One of the most notable examples are Massive Multiplayer online roleplaying games (MMORPG) such as EverQuest where the descriptive definition of the game is to live a second life using a character that you have built yourself. These games are very similar with how people actually perform daily activities (i.e. getting a job, working towards future goals), studies have been done on game participants playing to see if the game impacts their real life interactions.

While video games are unquestionably built with the intention of being enjoyable and fun, functions or programs built into the game sometimes have interesting, though unanticipated, outcomes. An example of this happened in the MMORPG, World of Warcraft. The behavior that players had during a virtual outbreak of a disease allowed epidemiologists to study this behavior and use it as a disease outbreak model. While the properties of this disease were not designed into the game on purpose, due to its nature and the actions of the players (descriptive meaning) it allowed scientists to study the behavior and extract the evaluative meaning behind the players’ actions as they played.

Various political organizations have also used video games to get their points across or to try to visually represent their standing. For these types of games, the entire focus is on the evaluative definition because they are built for the sole purpose of trying to educate the player about the message and meaning the party has. A prime example of this would be the games by PETA.

== Education ==
Meaningful play is the idea of educational interactions, using games and play, to enhance learning. While this interaction has been studied most with experiments between teacher and child, it has also been studied in interactions between children and how playing by oneself in given roles can increase learning ability in fields such as reading.

In the field of education, inherent meaningful play, is most apparent during sports activities (During gym class or organized sports for example) where the play is useful for healthy physical development of the participant. As well, recess is a highly studied area for meaningful play where children build relationships and social skills. In the classroom, the idea of using games and play, with the designed meaning of teaching children or adults, has been done using various teaching games such as sing-alongs or educational board games. It has also been attempted on a larger scale by creating an entire educational computer game on a massive multiplayer scale. This game was first used in the field of biology to go through life cycles of certain animals and also to explain environmental changes to students. It allowed many students to all interact and participate with each other in a video game environment to help with learning and to make it more engaging.

It was realized that children can learn more quickly when the task is framed in the form of a game. This can be paralleled to the idea that when something is framed in the context of something you are familiar with, the task becomes easier. This has been shown with younger children in Brazil where their math skills were lower when compared to North American peers but when the problems were framed in the context of monetary transactions, with which they were familiar, they could answer at the same level as other children. Another experiment demonstrated that children excelled and learnt math (among other skills) faster when they were learning by playing a game where the meaning of the game was to learn math. Other proposals are being considered for how to use meaningful play to teach other subjects, such as science, in a more manageable way.

In every day settings, meaningful play is encouraged and performed through training animals to perform various actions such as the classic training of the dog to fetch the newspaper, or a cat to jump through a hoop. While humorous, these actions are performed for more than just the express to play, but also with the meaning and intention to train the animals. Various methods of playing with animals to train them or even to use play for therapy have been documented throughout history.

== Law ==
Meaningful play has also been used in the field of law. Difficult topics that arise during court cases or when attempting to retrieve eyewitness testimony can be problematic when dealing with children. Multiple methods (mostly placed under the label of play therapy) have been used such as fantasy role-playing or using dolls for children to recreate, through playing, the way they recall events.

== See also ==
Meaningful Play is also the name of a conference held at Michigan State University.
