= Ludeme =

Basic unit of play

A ludeme is an abstract fundamental unit of play in a game, such as the L-shaped movement of a knight in chess, as opposed to an "instrument of play" which forms part of the equipment with which a game is played, such as the knight piece itself. The term is used within the field of game studies to describe games based on their core game actions. It also serves as a conceptual basis for game descriptions used by AI to develop General Game Playing AI systems.

== Definition ==
Ludemes have three main properties that remain consistent between all users of the term:

- Discrete: A ludeme can be identified as one piece of information about a game (For example, the L-shaped movement of a knight is one self-contained mechanic).
- Transferrable: A ludeme can be moved to different parts of a game and can be moved between games. Ludemes can also be translated into understandable descriptions that can transfer information between people.
- Contrastive: Changing a ludeme creates a significant change in the way a game is played.

Additionally, the term can be differentiated based on if the ludeme can be broken down:

- Atomic Ludemes: ludemes that cannot be broken down into smaller elements (such as the action of moving a piece on a board).
- Compound Ludemes (also called Ludemeplexes): ludemes made up of other sub-ludemes (such as the specific L-shaped movement of a knight).

By this definition, entire games can be categorized as ludemes because they are discrete, transferrable, and contrastive elements of play that are made up of sub-ludemes. The use of Compound Ludemes, however, is not universally agreed upon.

== Origin ==
The term was originally coined by French game writer Pierre Berloquin. Alain Borvo, one of the first to use the term in writing (1977), defines it as a 'type rule' such as the method of trick-taking in a card game or the leap capture in a board game.

Ludeme as a term is considered similar to the term "meme" coined by Richard Dawkins in The Selfish Gene (1976), and as such it may also be referred to as a "game meme" because both have the property of transmitting throughout human culture. While the two terms bear similarities, it is unclear if the term ludeme was derived from Dawkins's definition of a meme.

== Uses ==
=== Ludii General Game System ===
Ludemes are used as the foundation of the Ludii General Game System which is programmed in Java. Using Ludii's Game Description Language, a game can be written out using ludemes in a way that a computer can interpret to make the game playable by humans or AI. Ludii is built using a class grammar approach, where each ludeme described corresponds to a Java class of the same name.

The Ludii General Game System is primarily used for developing General Game Playing AI that can play any game, as opposed to AI designed to play a specific game. Ludii is generally considered easier to write and read compared to its counterpart General Game Systems such as the Stanford Game Description Language (GDL) and Regular Boardgames (RBG).

The Ludii system uses a specific syntax to write out games using ludemes. Each Ludii game description contains information about the game's Players, Equipment, and Rules, in roughly the following structure.

- Players: Lists all of the players in the game, including a dummy player that acts as "nature" or randomness. This is also where the game's turn structure is defined (Alternating, Simultaneous, or Realtime).
- Equipment: Lists all equipment used, divided up into two categories:
  - Containers: Game pieces that "contain" other game pieces (such as the game board).
  - Component: individual pieces of the game (such as pawns)
- Rules: Lists all the rules of the game, divided into three categories:
  - Start: A sequence of actions to perform at the beginning of the game to set it up.
  - Play: The actions that each player takes on their turn.
  - End: A list of all the end conditions of the game, and their result (win, loss, etc.).

For Example, Tic-Tac-Toe described in Ludii syntax would look as follows:

(game "Tic Tac Toe"
	( players 2 )
	( equipment {
		( Board ( square 3 ) )
		( piece "Disc" P1 ) ( piece "Cross" P2 )
	})
	( rules
		( play ( move Add ( to ( sites Empty ))))
		(end if ( is line 3 ) ( result Mover Win ))
	)
)

This description is broken down as follows, and states that the game:

- Line 2: Is played by two players.
- Lines 3-6: Uses a 3 x 3 square board and two different types of pieces used by different players called "Disc" and "Cross."
- Lines 7-8: Has players place one of their pieces in an empty cell during their turn.
- Line 9: Ends when a line of three pieces of the same type is created, resulting in a win for the player who made the line.

The Ludii program also tracks the "game state," which changes based on the "Play" actions that are taken by human or AI players.

=== Digital Ludeme Project ===
The Digital Ludeme Project is a research project launched by the University of Maastricht in 2018. Its goal is to reconstruct ancient games using the Ludii General Game System in combination with AI systems. The rules of ancient games were commonly transferred orally and not written down, so the project aims to have AI automatically play games using the Ludii software to identify likely rulesets based on existing information, such as recovered game pieces.

The project has a database of 1057 games described in the Ludii Game Description Language and contains information about a game's ruleset, equipment, geographic location it was found, and time period. AI systems using the Monte Carlo tree search algorithm then play those games and record statistics, such as the game length, number of pieces on the board, and win-loss ratio of each player. These statistics are used to infer the "quality" of a given ruleset based on the likelihood that a human would enjoy the game (For example, games with a skewed win-loss ratio or longer play time are considered lower quality). While playing, AI can also identify issues with a given ruleset, such as if it results in an infinite loop.

These statistics can be used to identify likely rulesets for a game whose full rules are unknown. Researchers can also use the database to identify games that share common rulesets within a similar geographic region, allowing them to track the transmission of ludemes and possible evolution of games throughout history.

== See also ==
- Game mechanics

== Bibliography ==
- Borvo, Alain (1977). Anatomie d'un jeu de cartes (in French). Nantes: Librairie Nantaise Yves Vachon.
