= Magic circle (games) =

Artificial world of a game

Early virtual world: Ultima Online

In games and digital media, the "magic circle" is the space in which the normal rules and reality of the world are suspended and replaced by the artificial reality of a game world. As noted by Edward Castronova in Synthetic Worlds: The Business and Culture of Online Games, the boundary delineating this space "can be considered a shield of sorts, protecting the fantasy world from the outside world". Instead of being impenetrable, however, an examination of contemporary virtual worlds reveals that the magic circle is actually quite porous. More directly, there appears to be a relationship between virtual worlds and the outside world.

Even though virtual worlds display a range of attributes that are unique to their realm, they also exhibit characteristics deriving from the outside world. Castronova uses the term "synthetic world" because a synthetic world "cannot be sealed completely; people are crossing it all the time in both directions, carrying their behavioral assumptions and attitudes with them". As this suggests, elements of synthetic worlds are being evaluated in terms of their importance in the outside world. These newly established values, subsequently, gain significance on both sides of the membrane. Thus, it becomes difficult to determine the meaning of the word "virtual". As stated by Castronova, the "allegedly 'virtual' is blending so smoothly into the allegedly 'real' as to make the distinction increasingly difficult to see".

== Origin of the term ==
The term magic circle has been attributed to Dutch historian Johan Huizinga (1872–1945). In Homo Ludens: A Study of the Play-Element in Culture, Huizinga wrote:

All play moves and has its being within a play-ground marked off beforehand either materially or ideally, deliberately or as a matter of course. Just as there is no formal difference between play and ritual, so the 'consecrated spot' cannot be formally distinguished from the play-ground. The arena, the card-table, the magic circle, the temple, the stage, the screen, the tennis court, the court of justice, etc, are all in form and function play-grounds, i.e. forbidden spots, isolated, hedged round, hallowed, within which special rules obtain. All are temporary worlds within the ordinary world, dedicated to the performance of an act apart.

Huizinga's "magic circle" is not a new synonym for "game," but he conceived of a magic circle, like many other cultural activities, as having game-like characteristics. The term Magic Circle was coined by Eric Zimmerman and Frank Lantz in 1999 and popularized by Eric Zimmerman and Katie Salen in 2003. Eric Zimmerman admits this in his 2012 essay "Jerked Around by the Magic Circle – Clearing the Air Ten Years Later" writing:

The "magic circle" is not a particularly prominent phrase in Homo Ludens, and although Huizinga certainly advocates the idea that games can be understood as separate from everyday life, he never takes the full-blown magic circle point of view that games are ultimately separate from everything else in life or that rules are the sole fundamental unit of games. In fact, Huizinga's thesis is much more ambivalent on these issues and he actually closes his seminal book with a passionate argument against a strict separation between life and games. The magic circle is not something that comes wholly from Huizinga. To be perfectly honest, Katie and I more or less invented the concept, inheriting its use from my work with Frank, cobbling together ideas from Huizinga and Caillois, clarifying key elements that were important for our book, and reframing it in terms of semiotics and design – two disciplines that certainly lie outside the realm of Huizinga's own scholarly work. But that is what scholarship often is – sampling and remixing ideas in order to come to a new synthesis.

== Application to digital media ==
The concept of the Magic Circle was applied to digital games by Katie Salen and Eric Zimmerman in Rules of Play: Game Design Fundamentals. Salen and Zimmerman note that even though "the magic circle is merely one of the examples in Huizinga's list of 'play-grounds', the term is used ... [by him] as short-hand for the idea of a special place in time and space created by a game". In more detail, they describe:

In a very basic sense, the magic circle of a game is where the game takes place. To play a game means entering into a magic circle, or perhaps creating one as a game begins.

Salen and Zimmerman argue that "the term magic circle is appropriate because there is in fact something genuinely magical that happens when a game begins".

Within video games, the magic circle concept is often used in the game's introductory screens to help establish that the player should prepare to embrace the game's world; some examples include the opening of Super Mario Bros. 3, where the game starts with the lifting of a stage curtain that is a framing device for the game, and in Hearthstone, where the voice of a bartender welcomes the player to take a seat at his tavern.

Steven Conway, writing for Gamasutra, used the notion of the magic circle to identify when video games actually break the fourth wall. Conway defines the magic circle for a video game as encompassing both the game, and the way the player actually views and interacts with the game. Some games which are claimed to break the fourth wall are instead expansions of the magic circle to encompass the player and the video game hardware to create a stronger immersion into the game, Conway argues. For example, Evidence: The Last Ritual requires the player to read email sent to them in real-life and view web pages to proceed, which Conway explains is encompassing the player within the magic circle. True fourth wall breaking occurs when some aspect crosses the magic circle and breaks the illusion, such as when the title character in Max Payne, in a drug-induced haze, starts describing himself as a video game character and details what the player sees on their user interface while playing the game.

== Examples of permeability ==
According to Castronova, there are several areas that reflect the obscuring of the distinction between the real and the virtual. Three of these areas consist of "markets, politics, and law".

=== Markets ===
Online marketplace listing for World of Warcraft accounts

Virtual worlds usually contain their own currency. Thus, virtual goods and services have a certain monetary value associated with them. Moreover, many activities in these worlds require a certain degree of skill as well as commitment from the user, which adds to this value. The worth of goods and services, though, is not restricted to the virtual realm. While external markets, including eBay, sell content from synthetic worlds, virtual items gain importance in the outside world. As Castronova points out, "the existence of external markets makes every good inside the membrane just as real as the goods outside of it". In fact, there are Third World factories that are specialized in looting synthetic worlds for currency and other rewards. According to David Barboza, "the trading of virtual property is so lucrative that some big online gaming companies [as well] have jumped into the business, creating their own online marketplaces". Such marketplaces, however, exert pressures onto the economy of synthetic worlds. Castronova states that in worlds where the farming of loot has developed, "the value of gold pieces against the dollar rapidly drops and, therefore, the value of assets obtained by everyone in the game drops as well".

=== Politics ===
World of Warcraft online forum

Another example that illustrates the blurring of the distinction between the real and the virtual is related to politics and the concept of fairness within synthetic worlds. Castronova states that users "are a community of interests who are affected by the decisions of a coding authority, usually the game developers". Communication between users and the coding authority takes place in online discussion forums outside the synthetic world. Here, users can discuss issues of fairness they have experienced and pose suggestions for improving the world. By referring to the MMORPG World of Warcraft, Constance Steinkuehler and Marjee Chmiel mention that players "convene in online discussion forums to discuss and debate the merits of different builds, at times even refusing to play with others who have made choices that go against the communal wisdom developed therein". Even though there are political activities inside synthetic worlds, "debates, which really do involve legitimate political interests, almost always occur outside the membrane rather than inside it". Since game developers are seeking profit, they have to pay attention to these debates and, if necessary, adjust the rules within their products. Castronova notes:

When users take their in-world political concerns to out-of-world forums, they break down the distinction between virtual and real in a very radical way. In this case, it is the ordinary pressures of commerce outside the membrane that give voice to political pressures generated by situations entirely within it.

=== Law ===
Avatar in Second Life

The third area blending the understanding of the real and the virtual is linked with ideas regarding property. As the acquisition of currency, items, and skills within synthetic worlds is usually tied with a considerable time dedication of users as well as their individual abilities, people often gain the sense of owning their achievements in cyberspace. In May 2006, for example, Kathleen Craig wrote: "In what might be a first-of-its-kind lawsuit, a Pennsylvania lawyer is suing the publisher of the rapidly growing online world Second Life, alleging the company [closed his account and] unfairly confiscated tens of thousands of dollars worth of his virtual land and other property." Consequently, in October 2007, an entry in the "Blog" section of the Second Life website declared that both parties have agreed to settle the lawsuit and that the lawyer's "account, privileges, and responsibilities to the Second Life community have been restored". According to Castronova, "the obvious economic value of the interests present in synthetic worlds has led to some notion of value under the laws of Earth; law is another site where virtual and real are blending together".

== In culture ==
According to Castronova, our culture "has moved beyond the point" where distinctions between the virtual and the real are helpful. He concludes:

... the membrane between synthetic worlds and daily life is definitely there but also definitely porous, and this is by choice of the users. What we have is an almost-magic circle, which seems to have the objective of retaining all that is good about the fantasy atmosphere of the synthetic world, while giving users the maximum amount of freedom to manipulate their involvement with them.

According to Laura Kendrick, the scholarly work of reconstructing the Middle Ages is an "earnest game" that medievalists play in order to avoid anachronism in their work. She concludes:

We are encouraged to understand the medieval text by imagining what it meant to medieval players (performers and audiences); in other words, we are encouraged to play the role of a medieval interpreter, to pretend.

== In the culture of gaming ==
Economic, political, and legal activity that cross the membrane between the synthetic worlds and the Earth exist to blur any real distinction between what is synthetic and what is insistently real. These examples may be affected more generally to gaming as a collective. Games have become such a central part of living that the differences between game and real life is starting to become blurred. Continual development in the culture of gaming may be seen in various behavior and practices. For example, when a pilot of a plane receives instructions from an air traffic controller, at that very same moment, somewhere in the world, there is someone flying a simulation of that plane, or something like it, on a similar flight path, and that person also receiving path instructions from a controller; all of this is occurring through VATSIM.net, a virtual air traffic simulation system. Through the website, flight simulation has adapted into a multiplayer format, and ordinary people get to interact as pilots and interact with air traffic controllers to create a natural reproduction of actual air traffic.

The political movements that happen inside and outside games, for now, mostly concentrate on the games themselves. A gamer's day consists of switching between the game life and real life. But while one is sitting in front of their computer and is engaged in the synthetic game world, they are just as likely to discuss the day's weather as they are talking about the game, whilst chatting with a friend in-game. The distinction between labeling an act that strictly occurs in the game, and something that happens out of game (i.e. checking email about getting "gold" pieces in the game world) becomes inconsequential; the two worlds inevitably must interact with one another.

== See also ==
- Suspension of disbelief
