= Unstable Unicorns =

Card game

- Alternative names: Labilní jednorožci, Odjechane Jednorożce, Unikornisok: A rémes ménes, Неудержимые единорожки
- Designer: Ramy Badie
- Publisher: Unstable Games
- Release date: 2017
- Type: Dedicated deck card game
- Players: 2-8
- Age range: 8+
- Playing time: 30-60 minutes
- Website: https://unstablegames.com/collections/unstable-unicorns-products

Unstable Unicorns is a dedicated deck card game designed and illustrated by Ramy Badie.

Launched on Kickstarter in August 2017, it has earned over $1,865,000 in sales and garnered 33,000 backers. The objective of the game is to control a set number of unicorn cards, by playing unicorns and upgrade cards, and inhibiting other players with downgrades and other special cards. The game won the 2019 Toy Association's Toy of The Year Awards' People's Choice Award.

== Objectives ==
In Unstable Unicorns, players attempt to be the first to collect seven (2-5 players) or six (6-8 players) unicorn cards in their "Stable", or play area. Players may use various cards in the game deck to achieve this goal, either by granting themselves advantages or hindering their opponents.

== Gameplay ==
Unstable Unicorns is played with a dedicated deck of cards. Base editions come with a starter deck of 135 cards, and players may add as many expansion packs as they wish to alter the course of normal gameplay.

=== Play Zones ===
Unstable Unicorns has several dedicated areas for cards to be played:

- Deck Zone: The main deck, from which all players draw cards on their turn. Most cards will begin in the main deck. The game ends when the main deck runs out of cards to draw.
- Discard Pile: The zone where cards which have been sacrificed, destroyed, or discarded are placed. Certain cards are also moved to the discard pile once their effects resolve. This is usually adjacent to the main deck.
- Nursery: The deck of Baby Unicorn Cards. Players begin the game with one Baby Unicorn card, and they may gain or lose Baby Unicorn Cards over the course of the game.
- Stable: The area in front of a player. Players may play Unicorn, Upgrade and Downgrade cards here from their hand.
- Vault: Exclusive to the Unstable Unicorns: Diamond Edition set. This area is for the four Diamond Unicorn Cards, which may be taken from or returned to this area depending on a player's dice roll.

=== Gameplay ===
Players begin with five cards in their hand, and one Baby Unicorn card in their stable. Players may also have a reference card, to refer to the rules of the game. The player who is wearing the most colors goes first, and then play continues clockwise.

Players' regular turns consist of four phases:

1. Beginning: The start of a player's turn. Certain cards may trigger during this phase. For example, "Autoerotic Asphyxiation" forces a player to discard a card if it is in their Stable at the beginning of their turn.
2. Draw: The turn player draws a card from the deck.
3. Action: The turn player may play a card from their hand, or draw one more card from the deck.
4. End: The turn player ends their turn. Certain cards may trigger during this phase.

In regular gameplay, players may have a maximum of seven cards in their hand at any time. If they should exceed this number at the end of their turn, they must discard cards until they only have seven in hand. Some cards may increase or decrease a player's hand limit. For example, the "Game Master Unicorn" increases its controller's hand limit by three cards. Some cards may also skip certain phases of a player's turn. For example, the Downgrade card "Sticky Situation" forces an affected player to skip their Draw or Action Phase.

The game ends when a player reaches the required number of unicorns to declare victory, or when the deck runs out of cards to draw. When the deck runs out of cards, players have the option to shuffle the discard pile to create a new deck to continue playing, or end the game. If the deck runs out of cards before any player reaches the required number of unicorns, the player with the most unicorns wins.

If multiple players tie for the most unicorns in their stable, ties may be broken by adding up the number of letters in the names of all Unicorn cards in players' Stables. The player with the most letters wins.

If multiple players tie for the most unicorns and the most letters, no winner is declared, and everyone loses.

=== Terminology ===
Unstable Unicorns cards have several commonly used terms, which are used to resolve card effects:

- Draw: The affected player draws the top card from the main deck and adds it to their hand.
- Discard: The affected player removes a card from their hand and adds it to the discard pile.
- Destroy: The affected player moves a card from an opponent's Stable to the discard pile.
- Sacrifice: The affected player moves a card from their own Stable to the discard pile.
- Steal: The affected player moves a card from an opponent's Stable to their own Stable.

=== Types of Cards ===
There are nine different types of cards in the game. Each type of card has a color associated with it from the visible spectrum of light, printed on its top left and bottom right corners for easier identification. All Unicorn cards have a unicorn horn as a symbol, while other cards have their own unique symbols.

- Instant (Red): These cards have an exclamation point symbol. They may be played at any time during the game, including on an opponent's turn. Most Instant cards allow the user to stop another player's action, such as drawing a card or playing a card from their hand. Players may use as many Instant Cards as they wish on a single turn. "Neigh" cards, which are Instant cards that negate a player's action, may be used by a turn player to cancel another "Neigh" played against them.
- Upgrade (Orange): These cards have an upward pointing arrow, and grant positive effects when added to a player's Stable. Upgrade cards may be played in any player's Stable, and they remain there until they are stolen, sacrificed, or destroyed. For example, "Rainbow Aura" prevents its controller's unicorns from being destroyed by any means.
- Downgrade (Yellow): These cards have a downward pointing arrow, and grant negative effects when added to a player's Stable. Downgrade cards may be played in any player's Stable, and they remain there until they are stolen, sacrificed, or destroyed. For example, "Tiny Stable" affects its controller so they may only have a maximum of five unicorns in their Stable.
- Magic (Green): These cards have a star symbol. Magic Cards have special one-time effects which are activated when a turn player uses one, and they are immediately discarded once played. For example, "Unfair Bargain" allows the player who played it to trade hands with an opponent.
- Magical Unicorn (Blue): Magical Unicorn cards depict unicorns with special abilities, which can give their controller advantages in the game. Some Magical Unicorns may also have secondary effects which affect regular gameplay. For example, the "Ginormous Unicorn" is a Magical Unicorn which counts as two unicorns in a controller's stable, but prevents them from playing Instant Cards as long as they control it.
- Basic Unicorn (Indigo): Basic Unicorns have no special abilities, other than counting towards a player's total number of unicorns in their stable. Basic Unicorns have flavor text printed on them in place of card effects.
- Baby Unicorns (Violet): Baby Unicorns are special unicorns which count towards a player's total number of unicorns in their stable. Each player begins the game with one Baby Unicorn, and may add more to their stable from the Nursery through the effects of cards. Baby Unicorns cannot be sacrificed, destroyed, or returned to a player's hand, and are returned to the Nursery if a card's effect would do so.
- Ultimate Unicorns (Black): Ultimate Unicorns are especially rare unicorn cards, which are exclusive to certain sets, sales modes, or blind boxes. These cards are similar to Magical Unicorns, but their effects are often more powerful and game-changing. Most Ultimate Unicorns have a cost to bring them into play. For example, the "Time-Shifting Unicorn" is exclusive to the "Control" Base deck, which was only sold in Kickstarter in 2018. It requires its controller to sacrifice two cards from their stable when bringing it into play. If this card is in a player's stable at the beginning of their turn, they are allowed to look at the top three cards of the draw deck, and return them to the top of the deck in any order.
- Diamond Unicorns (Iridescent Pink): Diamond Unicorns are rare unicorn cards which are exclusive to the Unstable Unicorns: Diamond Edition set. At the start of a game, Diamond Unicorns are separated from the Main Deck, and placed in a play area called the "Vault". During a game of the Unstable Unicorns: Diamond Edition, players may roll a four-sided die to move a Diamond Unicorn between the Vault and their Stable, or between other players' Stables and their own. Diamond Unicorns have special effects, which trigger when entering a player's Stable. They cannot be sacrificed, destroyed, or returned to a player's hand, but they may be stolen or moved. Diamond Unicorns also count towards a player's total number of unicorns in their Stable.

== Editions ==
Unstable Unicorns has several editions, which are available on various platforms.

=== Original Base Deck ===
The Original Base Deck has a total of 135 cards, and was sold on Kickstarter. It is currently out of print, and has been succeeded by the 2nd Edition.

=== 2nd Edition ===
The 2nd Edition has a total of 135 cards, and was released in November 2019. Its cards have icons printed on its top left and bottom right corners, and each card has a logo of a "Cuddly Unicorn" head on the bottom right corner of its artwork.

=== Control Edition ===
Exclusive to Kickstarter, the "Control" Base Deck features new cards that specialize in protective magic and deck manipulation. For example, the Ultimate Unicorn "Archangel Unicorn" allows its controller to discard a card from their hand in instances where they would have to sacrifice or destroy a card in their Stable, and also lets them draw a card at the beginning of their turn. It requires a player to sacrifice three cards when bringing it into play.

=== Chaos Edition ===
Exclusive to Kickstarter, the "Chaos" Base Deck features new cards that specialize in destructive magic and summoning from the discard pile. For example, the Ultimate Unicorn "Nightmare Unicorn" allows its controller to choose a Unicorn card from the discard pile and add it to their stable at the beginning of their turn, and requires a player to sacrifice three cards when bringing it into play.

=== NSFW Base Deck ===
The NSFW edition depicts artwork and subject matter that is meant for mature players, such as sex, drugs, and violence. Some of its cards have similar effects to those in the Base Deck.

=== Travel Deck ===
The Travel Deck is adapted for playing on-the-go. Its first edition had 86 cards instead of 135, and the current second edition has 56 cards, supporting a maximum of four players. Besides cards from the original Unstable Unicorns game, it also has exclusive travel-themed cards. For example, the "Up For Anything Unicorn" is a Magical Unicorn, which allows a player to pull a card at random from an opponent's hand upon bringing it into their stable.

=== Unstable Unicorns for Kids ===
The "For Kids" edition features new mechanics which are focused on different sets of Unicorns, and corresponding Magic Cards which require players to discard cards if they do not have a matching Unicorn card in their Stable when played.

=== Unstable Unicorns: Diamond Edition ===
The "Diamond Edition" introduces the four Diamond Unicorns, which are exclusive to this set. It also includes a four-sided die, which players may roll during their turn to determine how they interact with the powerful Diamond Unicorns in-game.

== Expansion Packs ==
Unstable Unicorns features various themed expansion packs, each with new cards that may be integrated into any base edition of the game for more varied gameplay.

=== Uncut Unicorns ===
Originally introduced as an add-on to the base game, the cards in this expansion were eventually combined with the second NSFW Expansion as the NSFW Base Deck. Cards in this set originally had a black star in their bottom right corner, and were eventually reprinted with an emblem which resembles a unicorn horn sticking out from a pair of buttocks, known as the "Red Rocket".

=== NSFW ===
Originally introduced as an add-on to the base game, the cards in this expansion were eventually combined with the Uncut Unicorns Expansion as the NSFW Base Deck. It also comes with optional drinking and stripping rules for mature players. Cards from this set had the "Red Rocket" emblem printed in their bottom right corner, and eventually had the emblem moved to the bottom right corner of the card artwork.

=== Rainbow Apocalypse ===
Originally separated into the "Apocalypse" and "Rainbow Sprinkles" expansion packs, these were eventually combined into a single pack themed on cute characters and the Four Horsemen of the Apocalypse. Cards from this set have an emblem which resembles a thundercloud surrounded by stars.

=== Dragons ===
This set contains cards themed around dragons, and introduces new Magic Cards that specifically target this archetype. Cards from this set have an emblem which resembles a pair of dragon's wings.

=== Unicorns of Legend ===
This set contains cards themed around fantasy tropes such as mythical creatures, medieval settings, and magic. Cards from this set have an emblem which resembles a pair of crossed arrows.

=== Adventures ===
This set contains cards themed around explorers and seafarers, with a significant number of pirate-themed Magical Unicorn cards. Cards from this set have an emblem which resembles a compass rose.

=== Christmas ===
This set contains Christmas-themed cards, and may be combined with the Base set or the NSFW set. Cards from this set have a snowflake emblem.

=== Nightmares ===
This set contains cards themed around horror franchises and supernatural phenomena, and also introduces a new mechanic of removing cards from the game. Cards removed from the game may not be reintroduced. Cards from this set have an emblem which resembles a wailing ghost.
