= Homo Ludens =

1938 book by Johan Huizinga

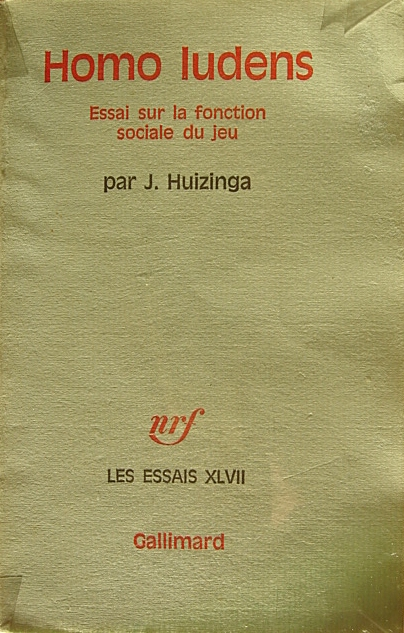
- Cover of the French edition, Gallimard
- Author: Johan Huizinga
- Language: Dutch
- Subject: culture, society
- Publisher: Routledge & Kegan Paul, London, 1949; Beacon Press, Boston, 1950, Random House
- Publication date: 1938
- Publication place: Netherlands
- English publication date: 1949

Homo Ludens is a book originally published in Dutch in 1938 by Dutch historian and cultural theorist Johan Huizinga. It discusses the importance of the play element of culture and society. Huizinga suggests that play is primary to and a necessary (though not sufficient) condition of the generation of culture. The Latin word ludens is the present active participle of the verb ludere, which itself is cognate with the noun ludus. Ludus has no direct equivalent in English, as it simultaneously refers to sport, play, school, and practice.

== Contents ==
=== I. Nature and significance of play as a cultural phenomenon ===
Play is older than culture, for culture, however inadequately defined, always presupposes human society, and animals have not waited for man to teach them their playing.

Huizinga begins by making it clear that animals played before humans. One of the most significant (human and cultural) aspects of play is that it is fun.

Huizinga identifies 5 characteristics that play must have:

1. Play is free, is in fact freedom.
2. Play is not "ordinary" or "real" life.
3. Play is distinct from "ordinary" life both as to locality and duration.
4. Play creates order, is order. Play demands order absolute and supreme.
5. Play is connected with no material interest, and no profit can be gained from it.

Huizinga shows that in ritual dances a person 'becomes' a kangaroo. There is a difference in how Western thought expresses this concept and how "primitive" religions view this. Scholars of religion use Western terminology to describe non-Western concepts.

"He has taken on the "essence" of the kangaroo, says the savage; he is playing the kangaroo, say we. The savage, however, knows nothing of the conceptual distinctions between "being" and "playing"; he knows nothing of "identity", "image" or "symbol"." In this way Huizinga suggests the universally understood concept of play is more fitting to both societies to describe this phenomenon.

=== II. The play concept as expressed in language ===
Word and idea are not born of scientific or logical thinking but of creative language, which means of innumerable languages—for this act of "conception" has taken place over and over again.

Huizinga has much to say about the words for play in different languages. Perhaps the most extraordinary remark concerns the Latin language. "It is remarkable that ludus, as the general term for play, has not only not passed into the Romance languages but has left hardly any traces there, so far as I can see... We must leave to one side the question whether the disappearance of ludus and ludere is due to phonetic or to semantic causes."

Of all the possible uses of the word "play" Huizinga specifically mentions the equation of play with, on the one hand, "serious strife", and on the other, "erotic applications".

==== Play-category, play-concept, play-function, play-word in selected languages ====
Huizinga attempts to classify the words used for play in a variety of natural languages. The chapter title uses "play-concept" to describe such words. Other words used with the "play-" prefix are play-function and play-form. The order in which examples are given in natural languages is as follows:

Greek (3)
παιδιά — pertaining to children's games,
ἄθυρμα — associated with the idea of the trifling, the nugatory,
ἀγών — for matches and contests.

Sanskrit (4)
krīdati — denoting the play of animals, children, adults,
divyati — gambling, dicing, joking, jesting, ...,
vilāsa — shining, sudden appearance, playing and pursuing an occupation,
līlayati — light, frivolous insignificant sides of playing.

Chinese (3)
玩 (wán) — is the most important word covering children's games and much much more,
爭 (zhēng) — denoting anything to do with contests, corresponds exactly to the Greek agon,
賽 (sài) — organized contest for a prize.

Blackfoot (2)
koani — all children's games and also in the erotic sense of "dallying",
kachtsi — organized play.

Japanese (1)
遊ぶ (asobu) — is a single, very definite word, for the play function.

Semitic languages
la’ab (a root, cognate with la’at) — play, laughing, mocking,
la’iba (Arabic) — playing in general, making mock of, teasing,
la’ab (Aramaic) — laughing and mocking,
sahaq (Hebrew) — laughing and playing.

Latin (1)
ludus — from ludere, covers the whole field of play

=== III. Play and contest as civilizing functions ===
The view we take in the following pages is that culture arises in the form of play, that it is played from the very beginning... Social life is endued with supra-biological forms, in the shape of play, which enhances its value.

Huizinga does not mean that "play turns into culture". Rather, he sets play and culture side by side, talks about their "twin union", but insists that "play is primary".

In this chapter, Huizinga highlights the antagonistic aspect of play and its "civilizing function". Using the research of Marcel Granet, Huizinga describes the festal practices of ancient Chinese clans, who incorporated various contests in their celebrations and rituals. These contests, in essence, divided the clan internally into what are known by anthropologists as phratriai, and these internal divisions become a social hierarchy, laying the groundwork for more "complex" civilizations.

When describing antagonistic relationships between clans (as opposed to internally), Huizinga mentions the practice of potlatch. He writes,

In its most typical form as found among the Kwakiutl tribe the potlatch is a great solemn feast, during which one of two groups, with much pomp and ceremony, makes gifts on a large scale to the other group for the express purpose of showing its [the gift-giving group's] superiority.

The potlatch is meant to be a frivolous, wasteful, even destruction display of superiority, and accounts are given of rival clans ruining their estates, killing their livestock and slaves, and even—in one instance—a spouse. Instances of this practice can be traced all over the world and throughout history, even in sacred texts; for example, Marcel Mauss claimed that "the Mahabharata is the story of a gigantic potlach" (quoted by Huizinga). Tying his reflections on the potlach to his underlying thesis regarding play, Huizinga claims that

the potlatch is, in my view, the agonistic "instinct" pure and simple. [All instances of the potlatch] must be regarded first and foremost as a violent expression of the human need to fight. Once this is admitted we may call them, strictly speaking, "play" -- serious play, fateful and fatal play, bloody play, sacred play, but nonetheless that playing which, in archaic society, raises the individual or the collective personality to a higher power.

The remainder of this chapter is devoted to an analysis of the idea of virtue (άρετή) as it relates to αγων and play. Competition affords members of a community to win accolades, esteem, and honor, and honor, according to Aristotle, is what allows people "to persuade themselves of their own worth, their virtue." From this, Huizinga concludes that "virtue, honor, nobility, and glory fall at the outset within the field of competition, which is that of play." This connection between virtue (άρετή) and play affords Huizinga the connection he needs to link play with civilization:

Training for aristocratic living leads to training for life in the State and for the State. Here too άρετή is not as yet entirely ethical. It still means above all the fitness of the citizen for his tasks in the polis, and the idea it originally contained of exercise by means of contests still retains much of its old weight.

The remainder of the chapter is devoted to providing literary and mythological examples of contests that have served the civilizing function, with reference being made to Beowulf, Old Norse sagas, and many others.

=== IV. Play and law ===
The judge's wig, however, is more than a mere relic of antiquated professional dress. Functionally it has close connections with the dancing masks of savages. It transforms the wearer into another "being". And it is by no means the only very ancient feature which the strong sense of tradition so peculiar to the British has preserved in law. The sporting element and the humour so much in evidence in British legal practice is one of the basic features of law in archaic society.

==== Three play-forms in the lawsuit ====
Huizinga puts forward the idea that there are "three play-forms in the lawsuit" and that these forms can be deduced by comparing practice today with "legal proceedings in archaic society":

1. the game of chance,
2. the contest,
3. the verbal battle.

=== V. Play and war ===
Until recently the "law of nations" was generally held to constitute such a system of limitation, recognizing as it did the ideal of a community with rights and claims for all, and expressly separating the state of war—by declaring it—from peace on the one hand and criminal violence on the other. It remained for the theory of "total war" to banish war's cultural function and extinguish the last vestige of the play-element.

This chapter occupies a certain unique position not only in the book but more obviously in Huizinga's own life. The first Dutch version was published in 1938 (before the official outbreak of World War II). The Beacon Press book is based on the combination of Huizinga's English text and the German text, published in Switzerland 1944. Huizinga died in 1945 (the year the Second World War ended).

1. One wages war to obtain a decision of holy validity.
2. An armed conflict is as much a mode of justice as divination or a legal proceeding.
3. War itself might be regarded as a form of divination.

The chapter contains some pleasantly surprising remarks:

1. One might call society a game in the formal sense, if one bears in mind that such a game is the living principle of all civilization.
2. In the absence of the play-spirit civilization is impossible.

=== VI. Playing and knowing ===
For archaic man, doing and daring are power, but knowing is magical power. For him all particular knowledge is sacred knowledge—esoteric and wonder-working wisdom, because any knowing is directly related to the cosmic order itself.

The riddle-solving and death-penalty motif features strongly in the chapter.

- Greek tradition: the story of the seers Chalcas and Mopsos.

=== VII. Play and poetry ===
Poiesis, in fact, is a play-function. It proceeds within the play-ground of the mind, in a world of its own which the mind creates for it. There things have a different physiognomy from the one they wear in "ordinary life", and are bound by ties other than those of logic and causality.

For Huizinga, the "true appellation of the archaic poet is vates, the possessed, the God-smitten, the raving one". Of the many examples he gives, one might choose Unferd who appears in Beowulf.

=== VIII. The elements of mythopoiesis ===
As soon as the effect of a metaphor consists in describing things or events in terms of life and movement, we are on the road to personification. To represent the incorporeal and the inanimate as a person is the soul of all myth-making and nearly all poetry.

Mythopoiesis is literally myth-making (see Mythopoeia and Mythopoeic thought).

=== IX. Play-forms in philosophy ===
At the centre of the circle we are trying to describe with our idea of play there stands the figure of the Greek sophist. He may be regarded as an extension of the central figure in archaic cultural life who appeared before us successively as the prophet, medicine-man, seer, thaumaturge and poet and whose best designation is vates.

=== X. Play-forms in art ===
Wherever there is a catch-word ending in -ism we are hot on the tracks of a play-community.

Huizinga has already established an indissoluble bond between play and poetry. Now he recognizes that "the same is true, and in even higher degree, of the bond between play and music" However, when he turns away from "poetry, music and dancing to the plastic arts" he "finds the connections with play becoming less obvious". But here Huizinga is in the past. He cites the examples of the "architect, the sculptor, the painter, draughtsman, ceramist, and decorative artist" who in spite of her/his "creative impulse" is ruled by the discipline, "always subjected to the skill and proficiency of the forming hand".

On the other hand, if one turns away from the "making of works of art to the manner in which they are received in the social milieu", then the picture changes completely. It is this social reception, the struggle of the new "-ism" against the old "-ism", which characterises the play.

=== XI. Western civilization sub specie ludi ===
We have to conclude, therefore, that civilization is, in its earliest phases, played.
It does not come from play like a baby detaching itself from the womb:
it arises in and as play, and never leaves it.

=== XII. Play-element in contemporary civilization ===
In American politics it [the play-factor present in the whole apparatus of elections] is even more evident. Long before the two-party system had reduced itself to two gigantic teams whose political differences were hardly discernible to an outsider, electioneering in America had developed into a kind of national sport.

== Reception ==
Homo Ludens is an important part of the history of game studies. It influenced later scholars of play, like Roger Caillois. The concept of the magic circle was inspired by Homo Ludens, particularly in the section describing how "[i]nside the play-ground an absolute and peculiar order reigns" which "brings a temporary, a limited perfection" that "is beautiful".

== Foreword controversy ==
Huizinga makes it clear in the foreword of his book that he means the play element of culture, and not the play element in culture. He writes that he titled the initial lecture on which the book is based, "The Play Element of Culture". This title was repeatedly corrected to "in" Culture, a revision he objected to. The English version modified the subtitle of the book to "A Study of the Play-Element in Culture", contradicting Huizinga's stated intention. The translator explains in a footnote in the Foreword, "Logically, of course, Huizinga is correct; but as English prepositions are not governed by logic I have retained the more euphonious ablative in this sub-title."

== Editions ==
- Huizinga, Johan (1938). Homo Ludens: Proeve Ener Bepaling Van Het Spelelement Der Cultuur. Groningen, Wolters-Noordhoff cop. 1985. Original Dutch edition.
- Huizinga, J. (1949). Homo Ludens: A Study of the Play-Element of Culture. London: Routledge & Kegan Paul.
- Huizinga, Johan (1955). Homo ludens; a study of the play-element of culture. Boston: Beacon Press. ISBN 978-0807046814.
- Huizinga, Johan (2014). Homo Ludens: A Study of the Play-Element of Culture. Mansfield Centre, CT: Martino Publishing ISBN 978-1-61427-706-4.

== See also ==
- List of alternative names for the human species
- Hermann Hesse's The Glass Bead Game ("Magister Ludi")
- Homo faber
- Man, Play and Games
