= Eric Zimmerman =

American game designer, CEO of Gamelab

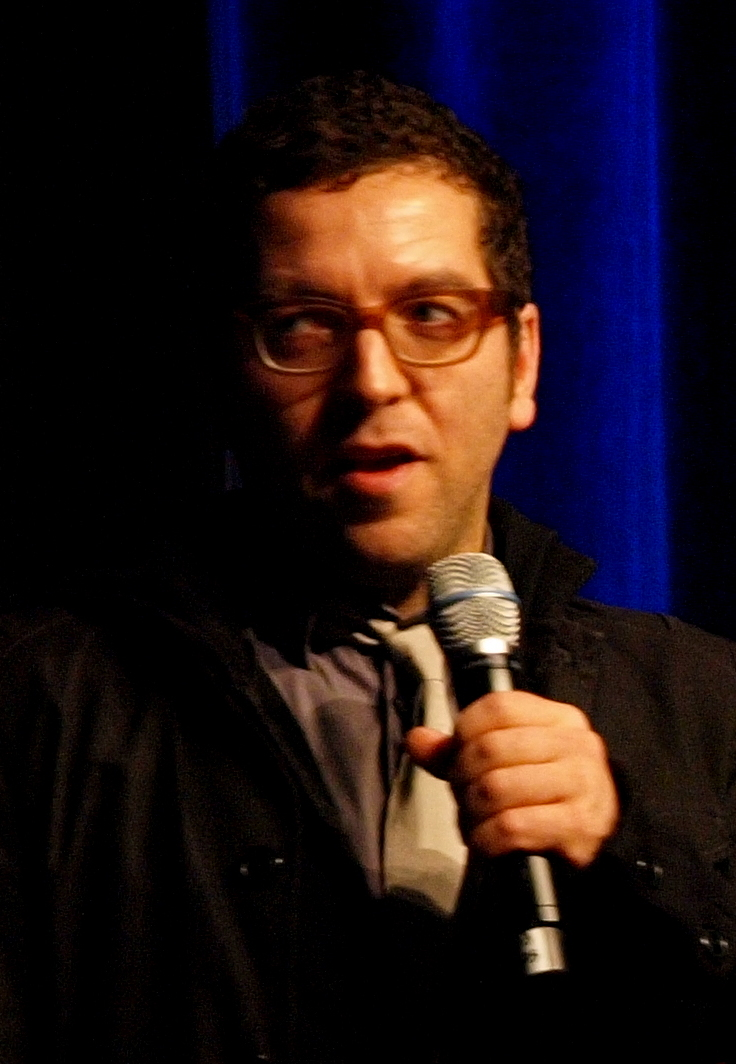
- Zimmerman in 2010
- Occupation: Game designer
- Known for: Co-founder of Gamelab
- Website: ericzimmerman.com

Eric Zimmerman (born 1969) is an American game designer and the co-founder and CEO of Gamelab, a computer game development company based in Manhattan. GameLab is known for the game Diner Dash. Each year Zimmerman hosts the Game Design Challenge at the Game Developers Conference. He is also the co-author of four books, including Rules of Play with Katie Salen, which was published in November 2004. Eric Zimmerman has written at least 24 essays and whitepapers since 1996, mostly pertaining to game development from an academic standpoint. He's currently a founding faculty at the NYU Game Center.

== Career ==
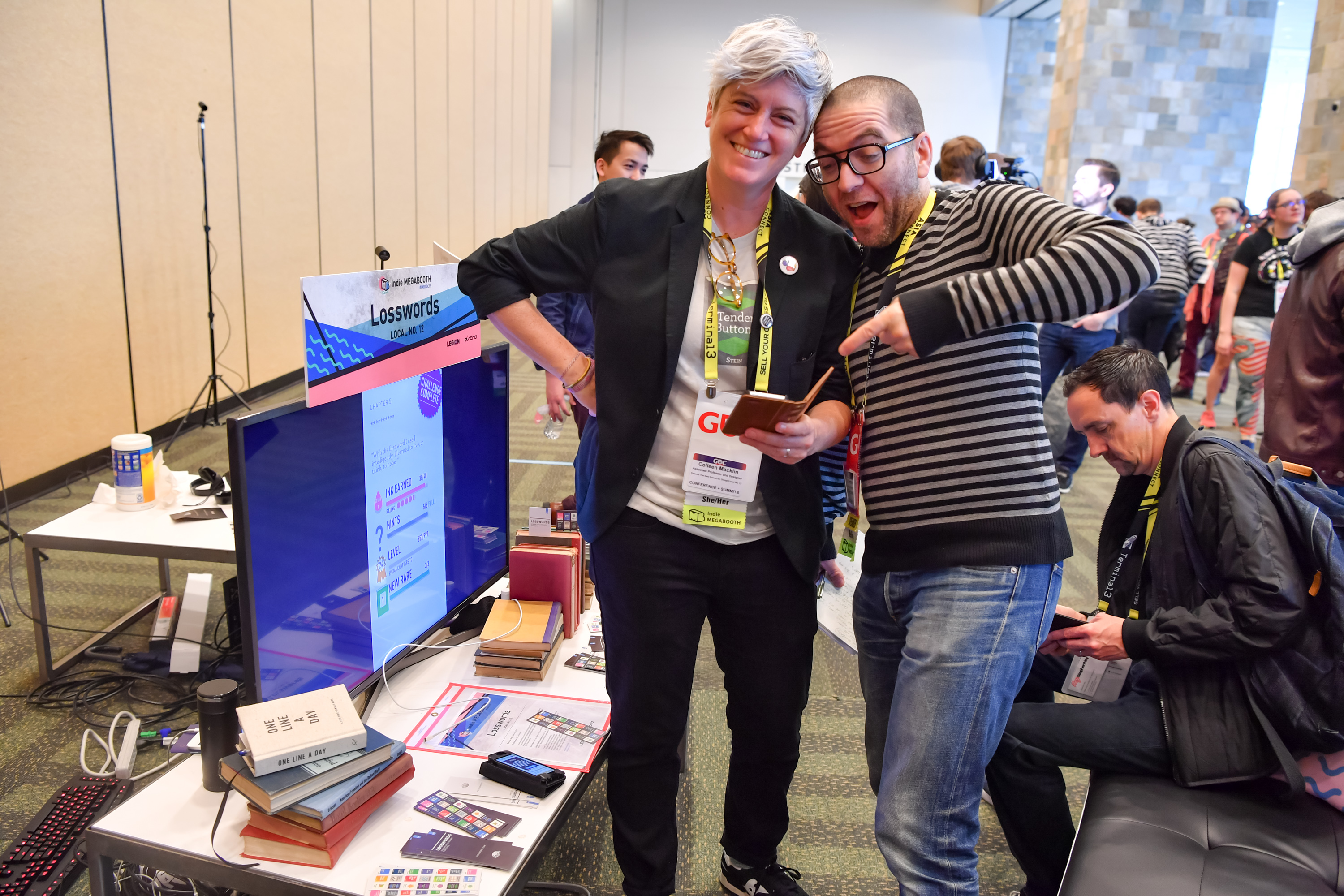
Zimmerman (right) at GDC 2019

Zimmerman develops video games and teaches game design. He has taught at universities including MIT, the University of Texas at Austin, Parsons School of Design, New York University, Rhode Island School of Design and School of Visual Arts. He co-designed the 1996 video game Gearheads with Frank Lantz at R/GA Interactive. During the game's development, they coined the term "engine" to refer to combinations of toys. Beginning in 2010, he serves as an Arts Professor at the NYU Game Center, within the Tisch School of the Arts.

In 2009, game development company Arkadium acquired Gamelab. Zimmerman continued as workshop director for the company.

Since 2009, Zimmerman has created a series of large-scale, performative games for art galleries and public space, in collaboration with architect Nathalie Pozzi. These games include Sixteen Tons, Cross My Heart + Hope to Die, Starry Heavens, which was shown at the New York Museum of Modern Art, Interference. and Waiting Rooms, at the Rubin Museum of Art

Zimmerman is a director of the RE:PLAY series of events and activities on gaming that included an exhibition, conference and accompanying book.

The first online game he helped create was a collaboration with Word.com called SiSSYFiGHT 2000.

Zimmerman is also a co-writer of a screenplay for a short film Play (2009).

Zimmerman was an Honorary Fellow at Eyebeam from 1997 to 1999.

== Awards ==
- IndieCade 2010 award – Finalists Choice award for Sixteen Tons
- IndieCade 2012 – Game Design award for Armada d6 and Interaction award for Interference
