= Play (activity) =

Voluntary, intrinsically motivated recreation

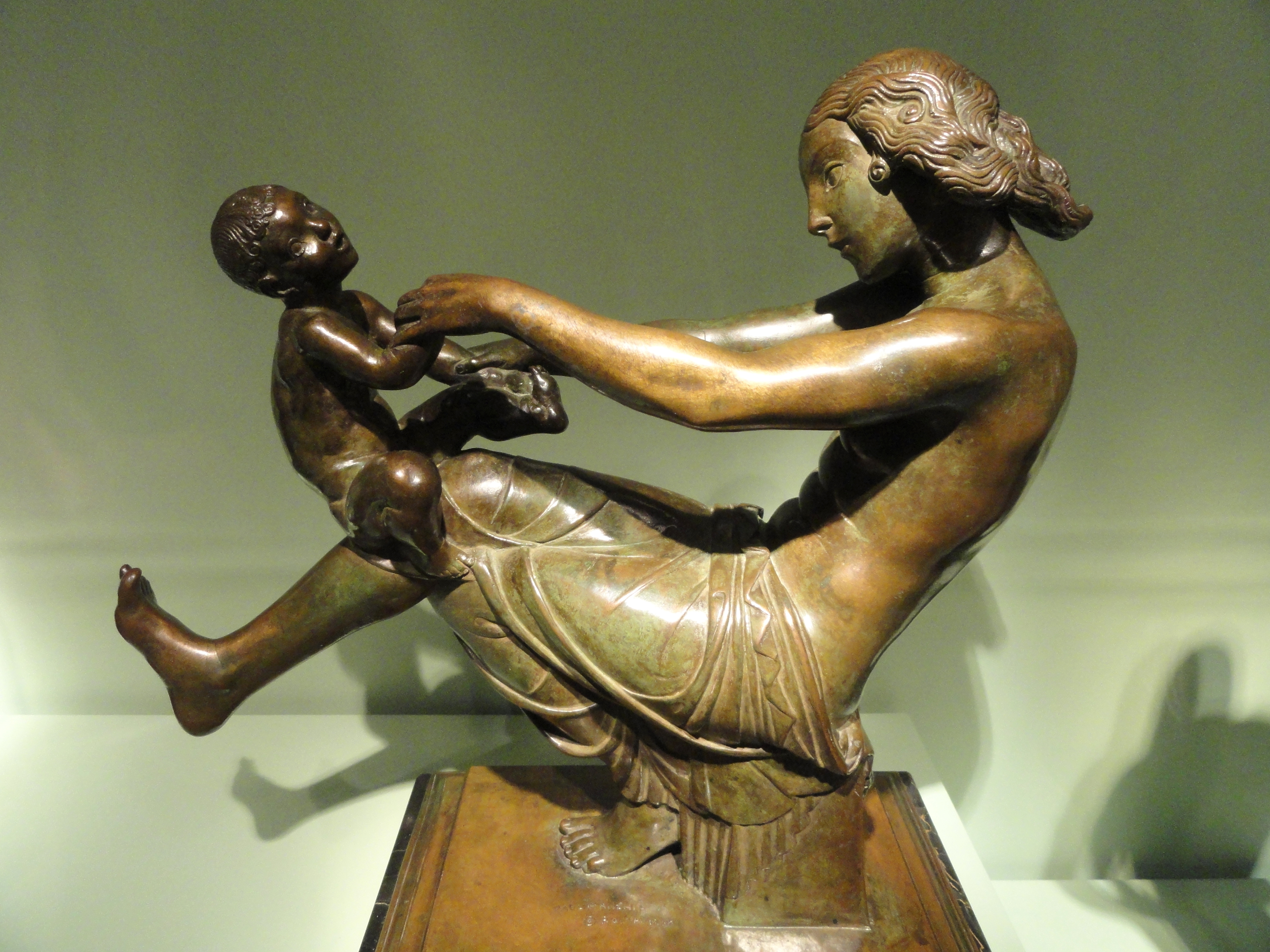
Playfulness by Paul Manship

Play is a range of intrinsically motivated activities done for recreation. Play is commonly associated with children and juvenile-level activities, but may be engaged in at any life stage, and among other higher-functioning animals as well, most notably mammals and birds.

Play is often interpreted as frivolous; yet the player can be intently focused on their objective, particularly when play is structured and goal-oriented, as in a game. Accordingly, play can range from relaxed, free-spirited, spontaneous, and frivolous to planned or even compulsive. Play is something that most children partake in, but the way play is executed is different between cultures, and the way that children engage with play varies.

== Definitions ==
The seminal text in the field of play studies is the book Homo Ludens first published in 1944 with several subsequent editions, in which Johan Huizinga defines play as follows:

Summing up the formal characteristic of play, we might call it a free activity standing quite consciously outside "ordinary" life as being "not serious" but at the same time absorbing the player intensely and utterly. It is an activity connected with no material interest, and no profit can be gained by it. It proceeds within its own proper boundaries of time and space according to fixed rules and in an orderly manner. It promotes the formation of social groupings that tend to surround themselves with secrecy and to stress the difference from the common world by disguise or other means.

This definition of play as constituting a separate and independent sphere of human activity is sometimes referred to as the "magic circle" notion of play, a phrase also attributed to Huizinga. Many other definitions exist. Jean Piaget stated, "the many theories of play expounded in the past are clear proof that the phenomenon is difficult to understand."

Another definition of play from the twenty-first century comes from the National Playing Fields Association. The definition reads as follows: "play is freely chosen, personally directed, intrinsically motivated behaviour that actively engages the child." This definition focuses more on the child's freedom of choice and personal motivation related to an activity.

== Forms ==
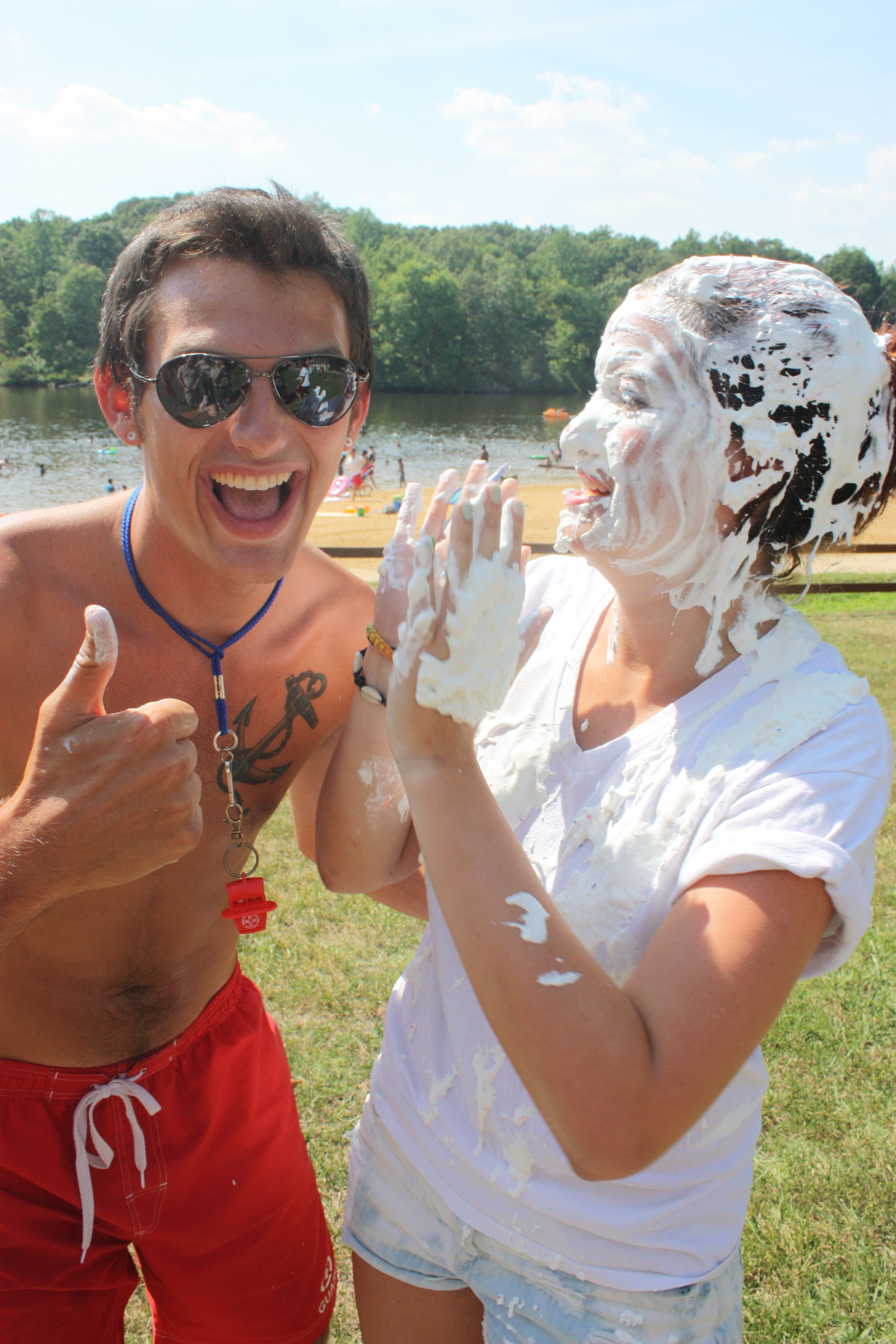
People having fun

Play can take the form of improvisation, pretense, interaction, performance, mimicry, games, sports, and thrill-seeking (including extreme or dangerous sports like sky-diving, high-speed racing, etc.). Philosopher Roger Caillois wrote about play in his 1961 book Man, Play and Games. Caillois interprets many social structures as elaborate forms of games and much behaviour as a form of play.

Free-form play gives children the freedom to decide what they want to play and how it will be played. Both the activity and the rules are subject to change in this form, and children can make any changes to the rules or objectives of the play at any time. Some countries in the twenty-first century have added emphasis of free play into their values for children in early childhood, for example Taiwan and Hungary.

Structured play has clearly defined goals and rules. Such play is called a "game". Other play is unstructured or open-ended. Both types of play promote adaptive behaviors and mental states of happiness.

Sports with defined rules take place within designated play spaces, such as sports fields—in association football for example, players kick a ball in a certain direction and push opponents out of their way as they do so. While appropriate within the sport's play space, these same behaviors might be inappropriate or even illegal outside the playing field.

Other designed play spaces can be playgrounds with dedicated equipment and structures to promote active and social play. Some play spaces go even farther in specialization to bring the play indoors, and charge admission, as seen at Children's Museums, Science Centers, or Family Entertainment Centers. Family Entertainment Centers (or Play Zones) are typically for-profit businesses that facilitate play and entertainment, while Children's Museums and Science Centers are typically non-profit organisations for educational entertainment.

The California-based National Institute for Play describes seven play patterns:

attunement play
establishes a connection, such as between newborn and mother

body play
an infant explores the ways in which their body works and interacts with the world, such as making funny sounds or discovering what happens in a fall

creative play
uses imagination to transcend what is known in the current state, to create a higher state. For example, a person might experiment to find a new way to use a musical instrument, thereby taking that form of music to a higher plane; or, as Einstein was known to do, a person might wonder about things which are not yet known and play with unproven ideas as a bridge to the discovery of new knowledge.

imaginative or pretend play
a child invents scenarios from their imagination and acts within them as a form of play, such as princess or pirate play

object play
such as playing with toys, banging pots and pans, handling physical things in ways that use curiosity

social play
involves others in activities such as tumbling, making faces, and building connections with another child or group of children

storytelling play
play of learning and language that develops intellect, such as a parent reading aloud to a child, or a child retelling the story in their own words

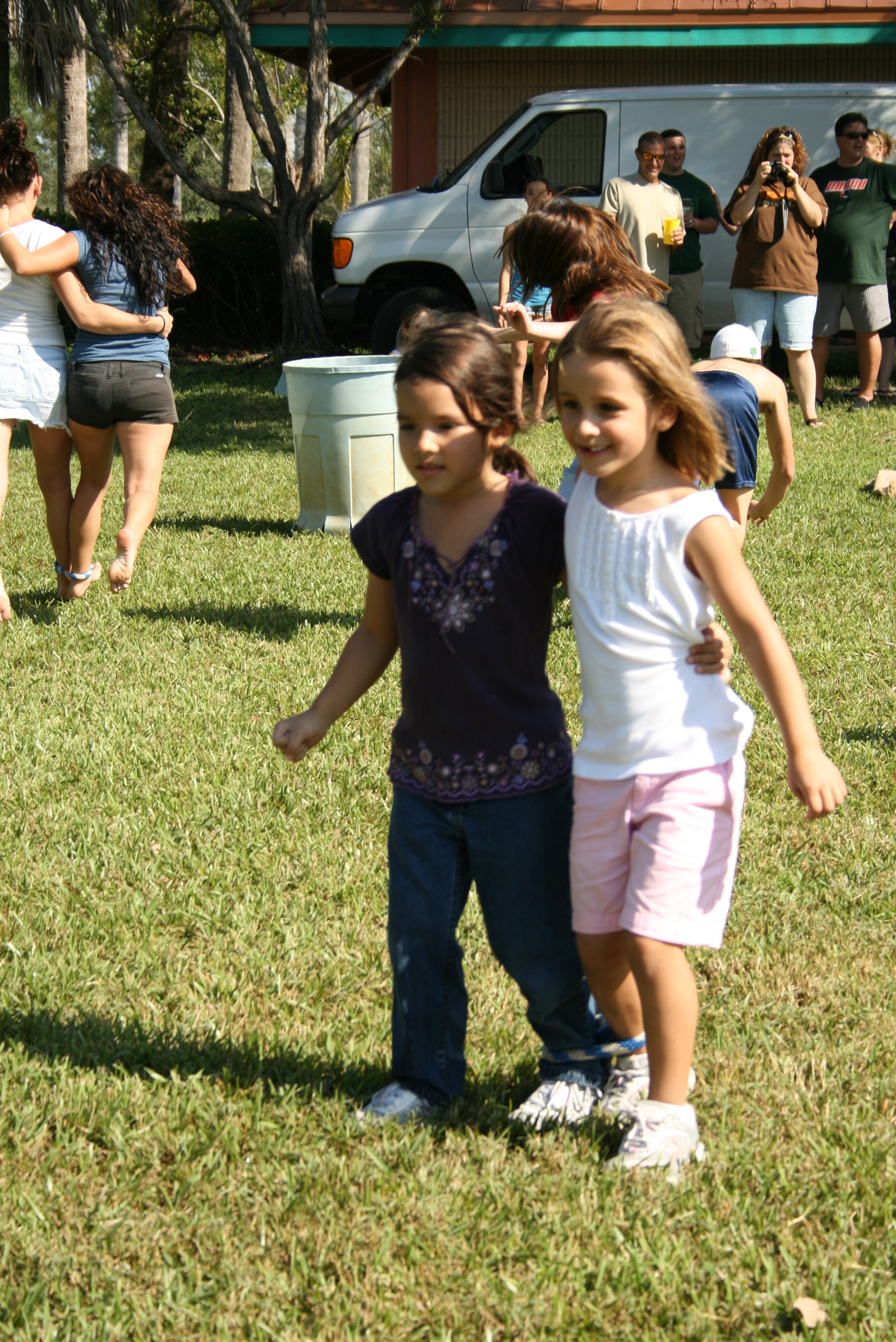
A three-legged race is a form of competition that requires cooperation with a partner.

Another classification system uses these categories:

challenge play
such as solving a Rubik's Cube puzzle
competitive play
such as a footrace
construction play
such as building with blocks
cooperative play
such as playing on a team or making up a new game together
nurturing play
such as playing with baby dolls
replica play
such as playing with toy versions of food in a play kitchen

Some forms overlap, such as a relay race (cooperative and competitive) or building a blanket fort (construction and creative).

Separate from self-initiated play, play therapy is used as a clinical application of play aimed at treating children who suffer from trauma, emotional issues and other problems.

== Children ==
In young children, play is associated with cognitive development and socialization. Play that promotes learning and recreation often incorporates toys, props, tools, or other playmates. Play can consist of an amusing, pretend, or imaginary activity alone or with another. Some forms of play are rehearsals or trials for later life events, such as "play fighting", pretend social encounters (such as parties with dolls), or flirting. Findings in neuroscience suggest that play promotes flexibility of mind, including adaptive practices such as discovering multiple ways to achieve a desired result, or creative ways to improve or reorganize a given situation.

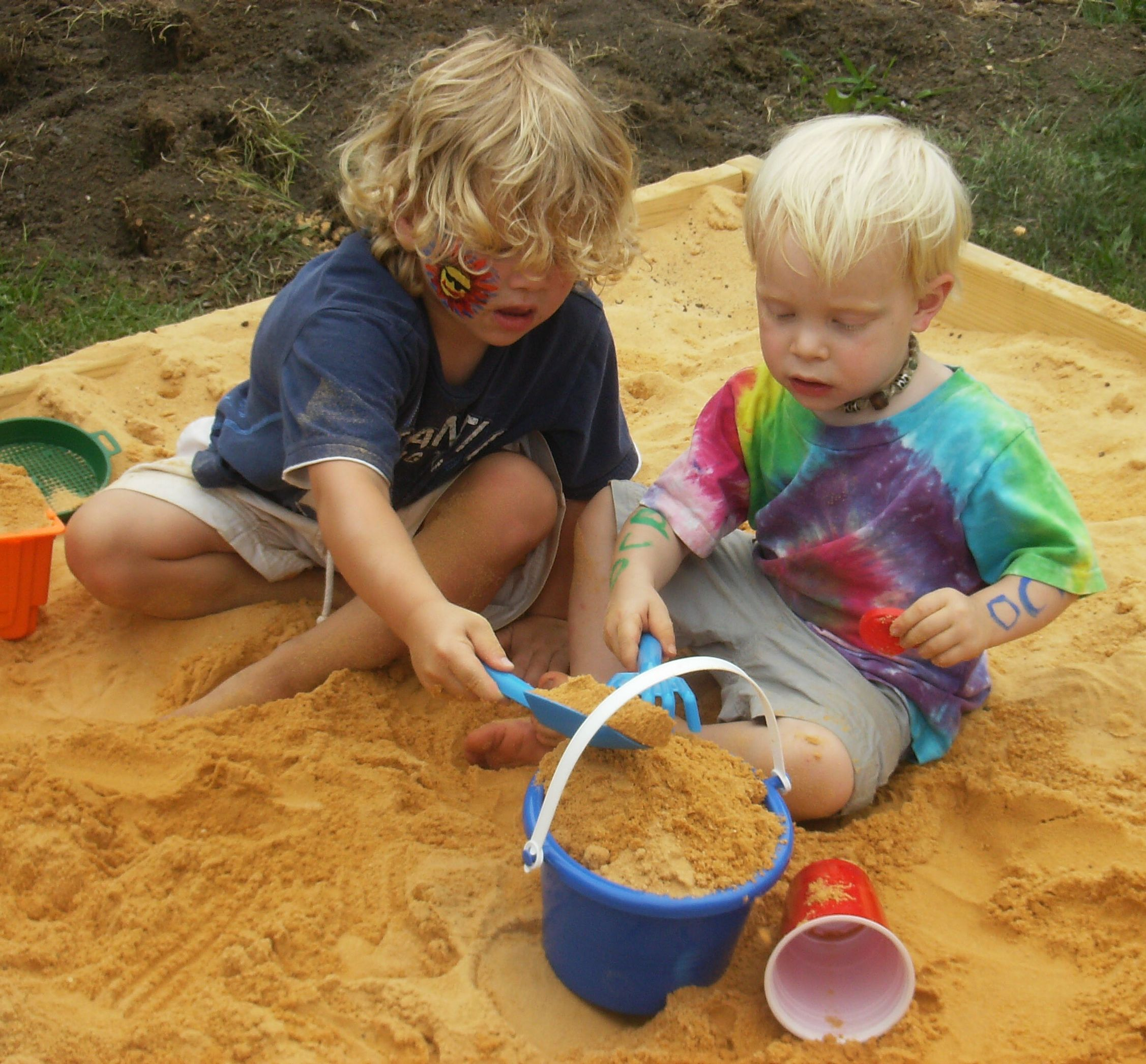
Children playing in a sandbox

As children get older, they engage in board games, video games, and computer play, and in this context the word gameplay is used to describe the concept and theory of play and its relationship to rules and game design. In their book, Rules of Play, researchers Katie Salen and Eric Zimmerman outline 18 schemas for games, using them to define "play", "interaction", and "design" formally for behaviorists. Similarly, in his book Half-Real: Video Games between Real Rules and Fictional Worlds, game researcher and theorist Jesper Juul explores the relationship between real rules and unreal scenarios in play, such as winning or losing a game in the real world when played together with real-world friends, but doing so by slaying a dragon in the fantasy world presented in the shared video game.

Play is explicitly recognized in Article 31 of the Convention on the Rights of the Child (adopted by the General Assembly of the United Nations, November 29, 1989), which declares:

- Parties recognize the right of the child to rest and leisure, to engage in play and recreational activities appropriate to the age of the child and to participate freely in cultural life and the arts.
- Parties shall respect and promote the right of the child to participate fully in cultural and artistic life and shall encourage the provision of appropriate and equal opportunities for cultural, artistic, recreational, and leisure activities.

Open ended play is a way for children to practice working independently.

=== History of childhood playtime ===
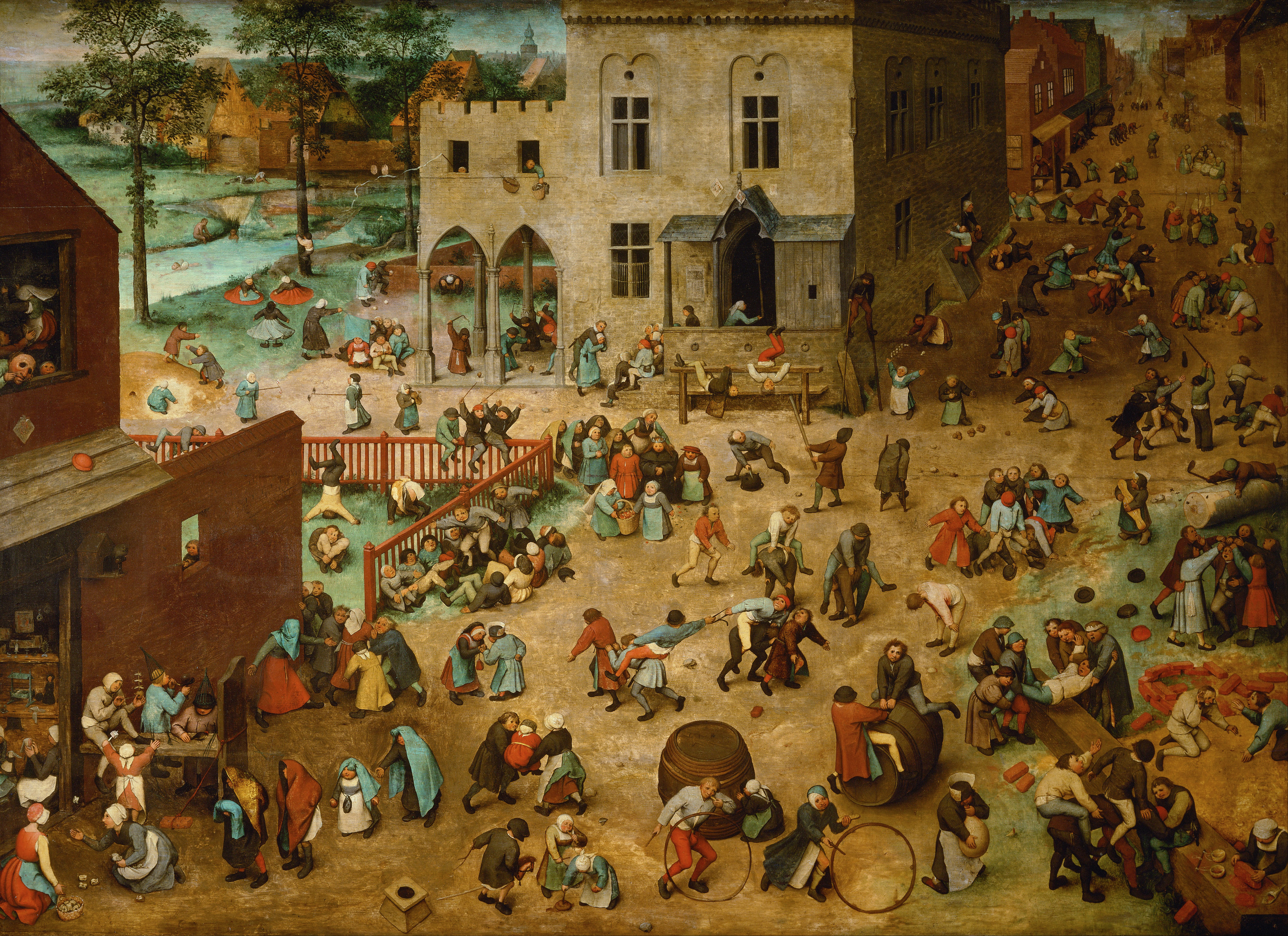
Children's Games, 1560, Pieter Bruegel the Elder

American historian Howard Chudacoff studied the interplay between parental control of toys and games and children's drive for freedom to play. In the colonial era, toys were makeshift and children taught each other very simple games with little adult supervision. The market economy of the 19th century enabled the modern concept of childhood as a distinct, happy life stage. Factory-made dolls and doll houses delighted young girls. Organized sports filtered down from adults and colleges, and boys learned to play with a bat, a ball, and an impromptu playing field.

With the rise of motor vehicle traffic in the 20th century, teenagers were increasingly organized into club sports supervised and coached by adults, with swimming taught at summer camps and through supervised playgrounds.

Under the American New Deal's Works Progress Administration, thousands of local playgrounds and ball fields opened, promoting softball especially as a sport for all ages and genders. By the 21st century, Chudacoff notes, the old tension between parental controls and a child's individual freedom was being played out in cyberspace.

== Cultural differences ==
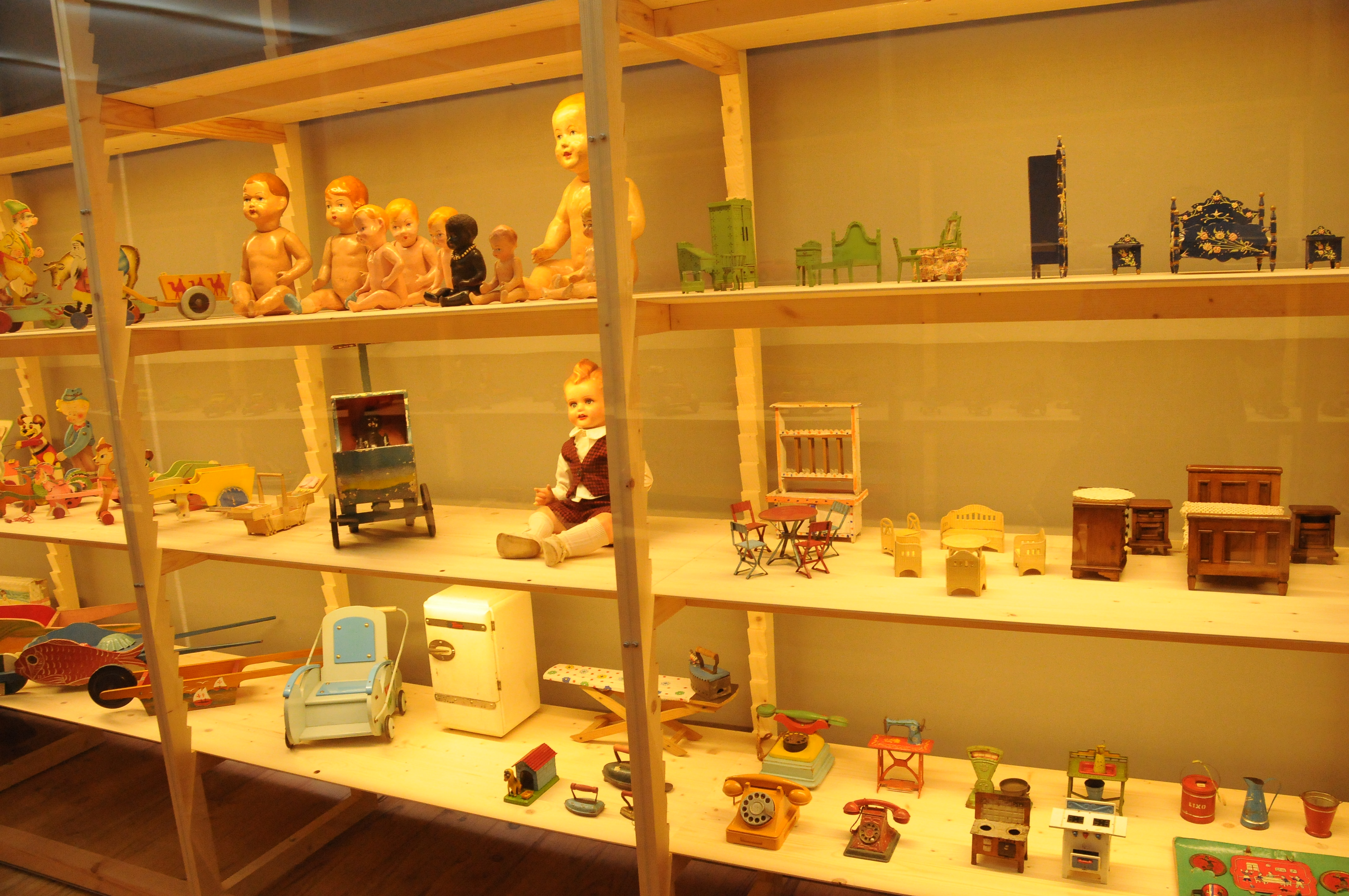
Museum of toys – Portugal

The act of play time is a cross-cultural phenomenon that is universally accepted and encouraged by most communities; however, it can differ in the ways that is performed.

Some cultures, such as Euro-American ones, encourage play time in order to stress cognitive benefits and the importance of learning how to care for one's self. Other cultures, such as people of African American or Asian American heritages, stress more group oriented learning and play where kids can learn what they can do with and for others.

Parent interactions at playtime also differ within communities. Parents in the Mayan culture interact with their children in a playful mindset while parents in the United States tend to set aside time to play and teach their children through games and activities. In the Mayan community, children are supported in their playing but also encouraged to play while watching their parents do household work in order to become familiar with how to follow in their footsteps.

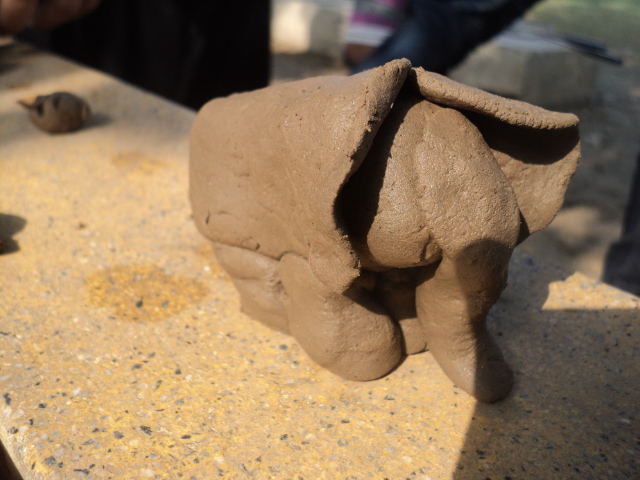
Children made an elephant figure out of mud as a form of play.

All around the world, children use natural materials like stones, water, sand, leaves, fruits, sticks, and a variety of resources to play. In addition, there are groups that have access to crafts, industrialized toys, electronics, and video-games.

In Australia, games and sports are part of play. There, play can be considered as preparation for life and self-expression, like in many other countries.

Groups of children in Efe of the Democratic Republic of Congo can be seen making 'food' from dirt or pretending to shoot bows and arrows much like their elders. These activities are similar to other forms of play worldwide. For instance, children can be seen comforting their toy dolls or animals, anything that they have modeled from adults in their communities.

In Brazil, children can be found playing with balls, kites, marbles, pretend houses, or mud kitchens, like in many other countries. In smaller communities they use mud balls, little stones or cashews to replace marbles.

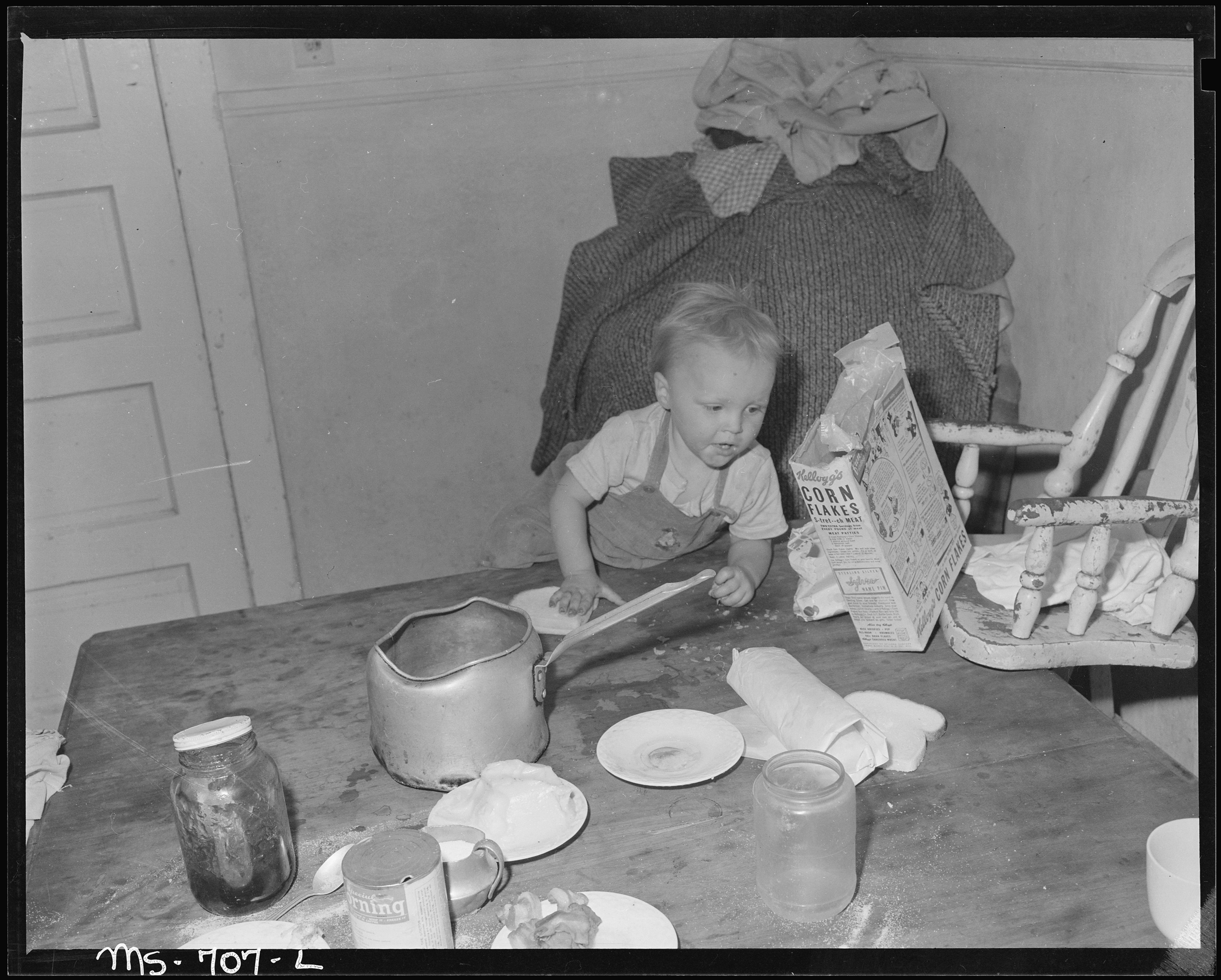
Child playing around the kitchen

At an indigenous community of Sierra Nevada de Santa Marta in Colombia, children's play is highly valued and encouraged by leaders and parents. They interact with the children of different ages and explore together different environments to let the children express themselves as part of the group.

Some children in the Sahara use clay figures as their forms of playful toys. Toys in general are a representation of cultural practices. They usually illustrate characters and objects of a community.

Play time can be a way for children to learn the different ways of their culture. Many communities use play to emulate work. The way in which children mimic work through their play can differ according to the opportunities they have access to, but it is something that tends to be promoted by adults.

== Sports ==
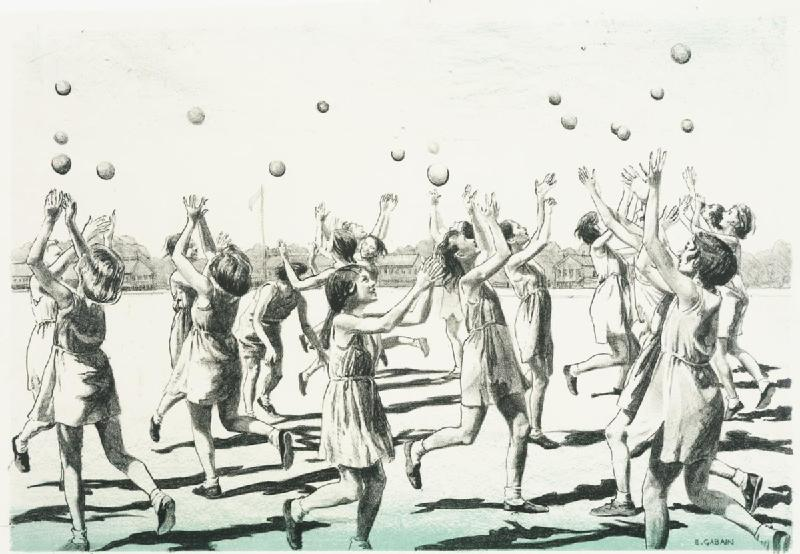
Children at play, 1940

Sport activities are one of the most universal forms of play. Different continents have their own popular/dominant sports. For example, European, South American, and African countries enjoy soccer (also known as 'football' in Europe), while North American countries prefer basketball, ice hockey, baseball, or American football. In Asia, sports such as table tennis and badminton are played professionally; however soccer and basketball are played amongst common folks, with cricket popular in South Asia. Events such as The Olympic Games and FIFA World Cup showcase countries competing with each other and are broadcast all over the world.

Sports can be played as a leisure activity or within a competition. According to sociologist Norbert Elias it is an important part of "civilization process". Victory and defeat in sports can influence one's emotions to a point where everything else seems irrelevant. Sport fans can also imagine what it feels like to play for their preferred team. The feelings people experience can be so surreal that it affects their emotions and behavior.

=== Benefits in youth ===
Youth sport can provide a positive outcome for youth development. Research shows adolescents are more motivated and engaged in sports than any other activity, and these conditions predict a richer personal and interpersonal development. Anxiety, depression and obesity can stem from lack of activity and social interaction. There is a high correlation between the amount of time that youth spend playing sports and physical (e.g., better general health), psychological (e.g., subjective well-being), academic (e.g., school grades), and social benefits (e.g., making friends). Electronics are a form of playtime, but researchers have found that most electronic play leads to lack of motivation, no social interaction, and can lead to obesity. Play is children using their creativity while developing their imagination, dexterity, and physical, cognitive, and emotional strength. Dramatic play is common in younger children. For youth to benefit from playtime, the following are recommended:

- Give children ample, unscheduled time to be creative to reflect and decompress.
- Give children "true" toys, such as blocks or dolls for creativity.
- Youth should have a group of supportive people around them (teammates, coaches, and parents) with positive relationships.
- Youth should possess skill development; such as physical, interpersonal, and knowledge about the sport.
- Youth should be able to make their own decisions about their sport participation.
- Youth should have experiences that are on par with their needs and developmental level.

=== Research findings on benefits in youth ===
By participating regularly in a variety of sports, children can develop and become more proficient at various skills (such as jumping, kicking, running, throwing, etc.) if they focus on skill mastery and development. Young athletes can also develop:

- agility and speed
- enhanced functioning and health of cardiorespiratory and muscular systems
- improved flexibility, mobility, and coordination
- increased stamina and strength
- increased likelihood of maintaining weight

Regular participation in sport and physical activity is associated with a lower risk of diabetes, heart disease, obesity, and other related diseases. According to research by the Australian Early Childhood Mental Health Initiative, children can be assisted in dealing with and managing stress by developing their sense of optimism when playing sports. Young people also tend to be more nutrition-conscious in their food choices when they participate in sport. Girls involved in sport are less likely to experience teenage pregnancy, begin smoking, or develop breast cancer. Young athletes have shown lower levels of total cholesterol and other favorable profiles in serum lipid parameters associated with cardiovascular disease. Sport provides an arena for young people to be physically active and so reduces the time spent in sedentary pursuits, such as watching TV and playing video games.

== Adults ==
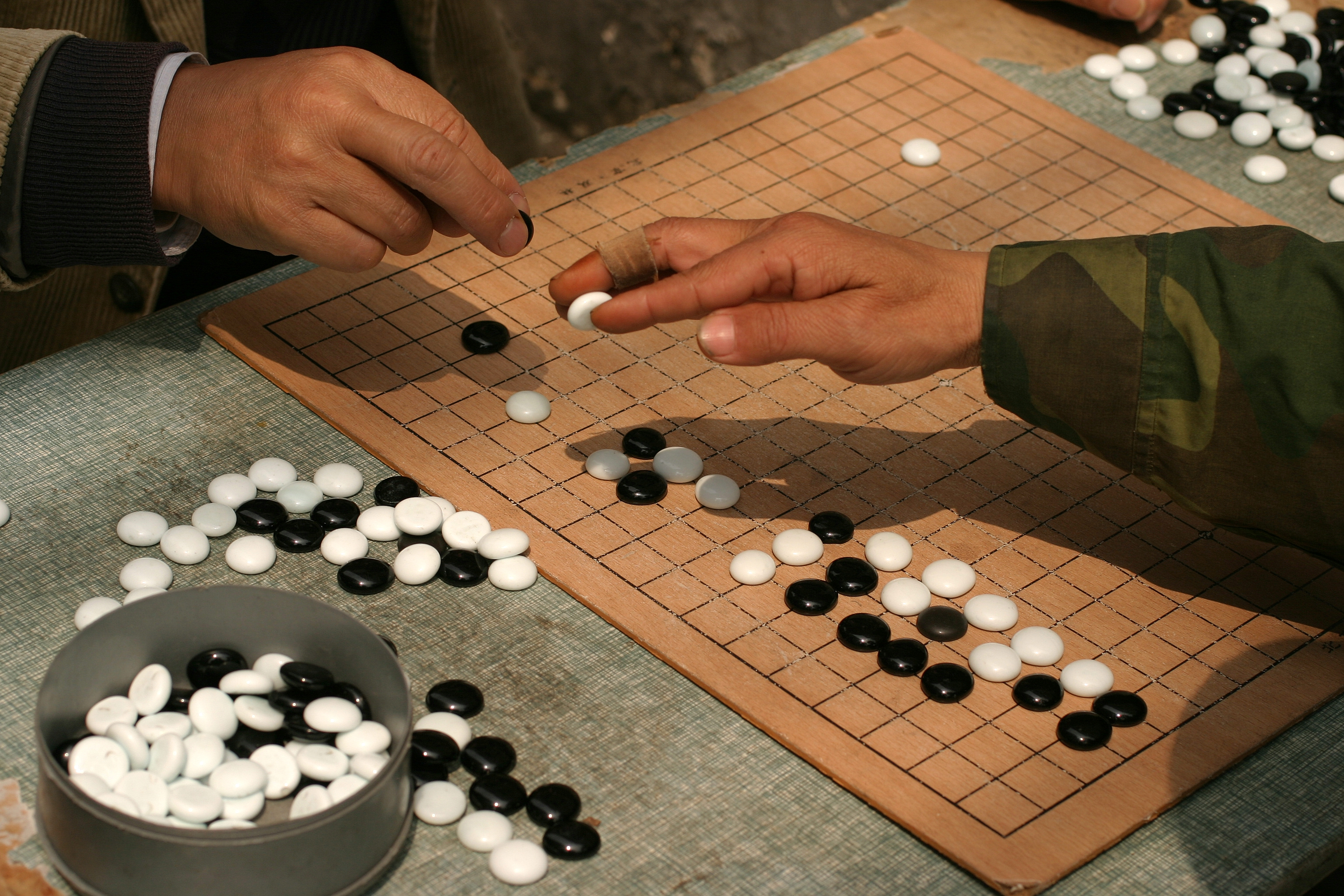
Playing weiqi in Shanghai

Although adults who engage in high amounts of play may find themselves described as "childish" or "young at heart" by less playful adults, play is an important activity, regardless of age. Creativity and happiness can result from adult play, where the objective can be more than fun alone, as in adult expression of the arts, or curiosity-driven science. Some adult "hobbies" are examples of such creative play. In creative professions, such as design, playfulness can dispel more serious attitudes (such as shame or embarrassment) that impede brainstorming or artistic experimentation in design.

Imaginative play and role play may allow adults to practice useful habits such as learned optimism, which is helpful in managing fear or terrors. Play also offers adults the opportunity to practice concepts that may not have been explicitly or formally taught (e.g. how to manage misinformation or deceit). Thus, even though play is just one of many tools used by effective adults, it remains a necessary one.

== Workplace ==
There has been extensive research on the benefits of play among children, youth, and adolescence. Overlooked are the benefits of play for adults—more specifically, adults who spend a lot of time in the workplace. Many adults in North America are in the workforce and spend half of their waking hours in a workplace environment with little to no time for play. Play in this context refers to leisure-type activities with colleagues during lunch breaks or short breaks throughout the working day. Leisure activities might include physical sport activities, card games, board games, video games, foosball, ping-pong, yoga, and boot-camp sessions.

Playing games may promote a persistent and optimistic motivational style and positive affect. Positive affect enhances people's experiences, enjoyment, and sense of satisfaction, during their engagement with a task. While people are engaged in work, positive affect increases the satisfaction they feel from the work, and this increases their creativity and improves their performance on problem-solving tasks as well as other tasks. The development of a persistent motivational style charged with positive affect may lead to lasting work success.

Work and play are mutually supportive. Employees need to experience the sense of newness, flow, discovery, and liveliness that play provides. This provides the employee with the sense that they are integrated within the organization, and therefore they feel and perform better.

Incorporating play at work results in more productivity, creativity and innovation, higher job satisfaction, greater workplace morale, stronger or new social bonds, improved job performance, and a decrease in staff turnover, absenteeism, and stress. Decreased stress leads to less illness, which results in lower health care costs. Play at work may help employees function and cope when under stress, refresh body and mind, encourage teamwork, trigger creativity, and increase energy while preventing burnout.

Companies that encourage play at work, whether short breaks throughout the day or during lunch breaks, are more successful because this leads to positive emotion among employees. Risk taking, confidence in presenting novel ideas, and embracing unusual and fresh perspectives are associated with play at work. Play can increase self-reported job satisfaction and well-being. Employees experiencing positive emotions are more cooperative, more social, and perform better when faced with complex tasks.

Contests, team-building exercises, fitness programs, mental health breaks, and other social activities make the work environment fun, interactive, and rewarding. Playfighting, i.e. playful fights or fictive disputes, may contribute to organizations and institutions, as in youth care settings. Playfighting is a recurrent pattern in the social life of a youth care institution and sits at the core of what inmates and staff have to deal with.

== Seniors ==
Older adults represent one of the fastest growing populations around the world. The United Nations predicted an increase of those aged 60 and above from 629 million in 2002 to approximately two billion in 2050 but increased life expectancy does not necessarily translate to a better quality of life. For this reason, research has begun to investigate methods to maintain and/or improve quality of life among older adults.

Similar to the data surrounding children and adults, play and activity are associated with improved health and quality of life among seniors. Additionally, play and activity tend to affect successful aging as well as boost well-being throughout the lifespan. Although children, adults, and seniors all tend to benefit from play, older adults often perform it in unique ways to account for possible issues, such as health restrictions, limited accessibility, and revised priorities. For this reason, elderly people may partake in physical exercise groups, interactive video games, and social forums specifically geared towards their needs and interests. One qualitative research study found older adults often chose to engage in specific games such as dominoes, checkers, and bingo for entertainment. Another study indicated a common pattern in game preferences among older adults: seniors often favor activities that encourage mental and physical fitness, incorporate past interests, have some level of competition, and foster a sense of belonging. Researchers investigating play in older adults are also interested in the benefits of technology and video games as therapeutic tools. These outlets can lower the risk of developing particular diseases, reduce feelings of social isolation and stress, and promote creativity and the maintenance of cognitive skills. As a result, play has been integrated into physiotherapy and occupational therapy interventions for seniors.

The ability to incorporate play into one's routine is important because these activities allow participants to express creativity, improve verbal and non-verbal intelligence, and enhance balance. These benefits may be especially crucial to seniors because cognitive and physical functioning declines with age. However, it might not be aging itself that is associated with the decline in cognitive and physical capabilities, but the higher levels of inactivity in older adults.

Play and activity tend to decline with age which may result in negative outcomes such as social isolation, depression, and mobility issues. American studies found that only 24% of seniors took part in regular physical activity and only 42% use the internet for entertainment purposes. In comparison to other age groups, the elderly are more likely to experience a variety of barriers, such as difficulty with environmental hazards and accessibility issues, that may hinder their abilities to play. Although playing may benefit seniors, it also has the potential to negatively impact their health. For example, those who play may be more susceptible to injury. Investigating these barriers may assist in the creation of useful interventions and/or the development of preventative measures, such as establishing safer recreational areas, that promote play throughout elderly life.

A moderate level of play has numerous positive outcomes in the lives of senior citizens. To support and promote play within the older population, institutions should set up more diverse equipment, improve conditions within recreational areas, and create more video games or online forums that appeal to the needs of seniors.

== Other animals ==
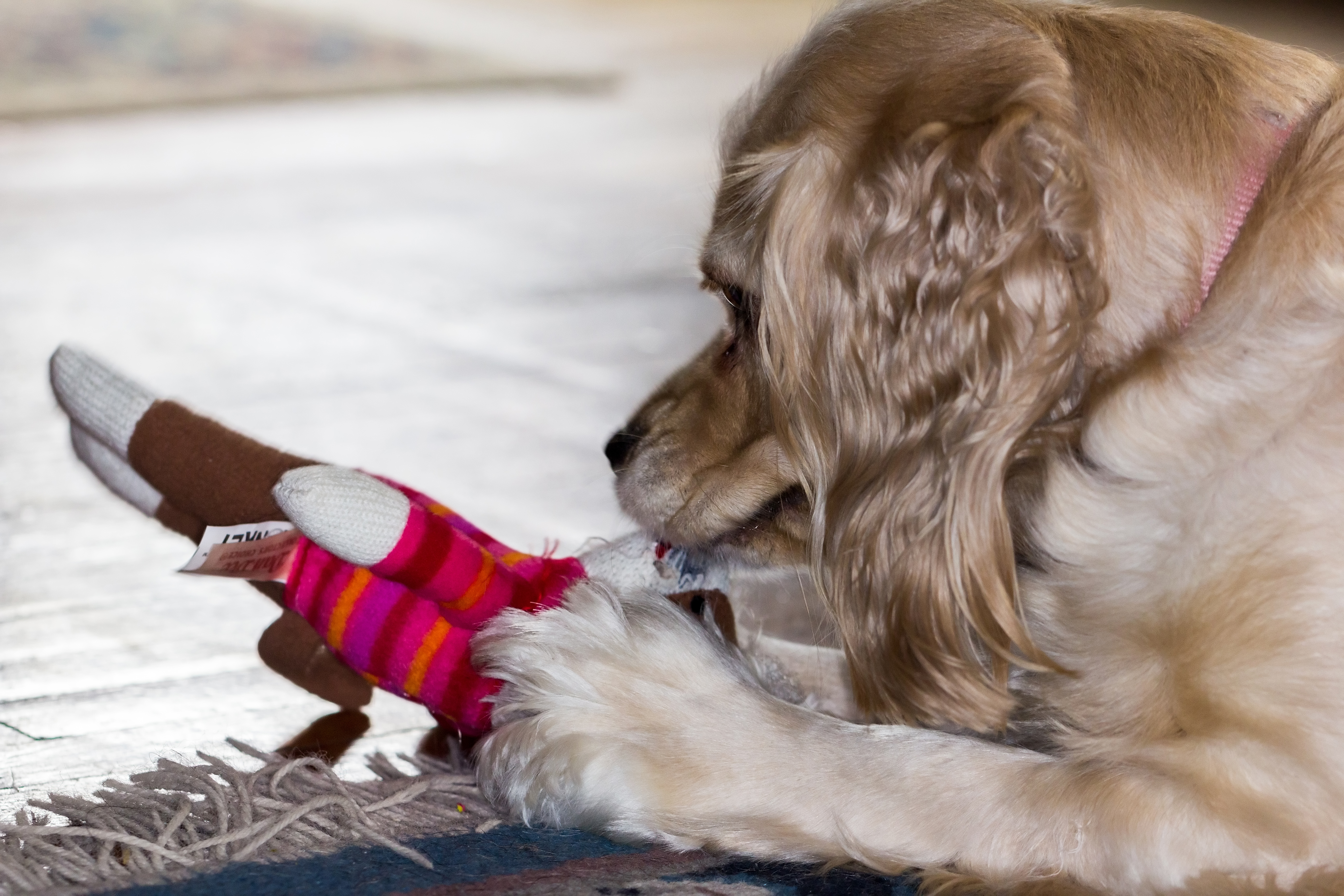
Cocker spaniel playing with a monkey doll

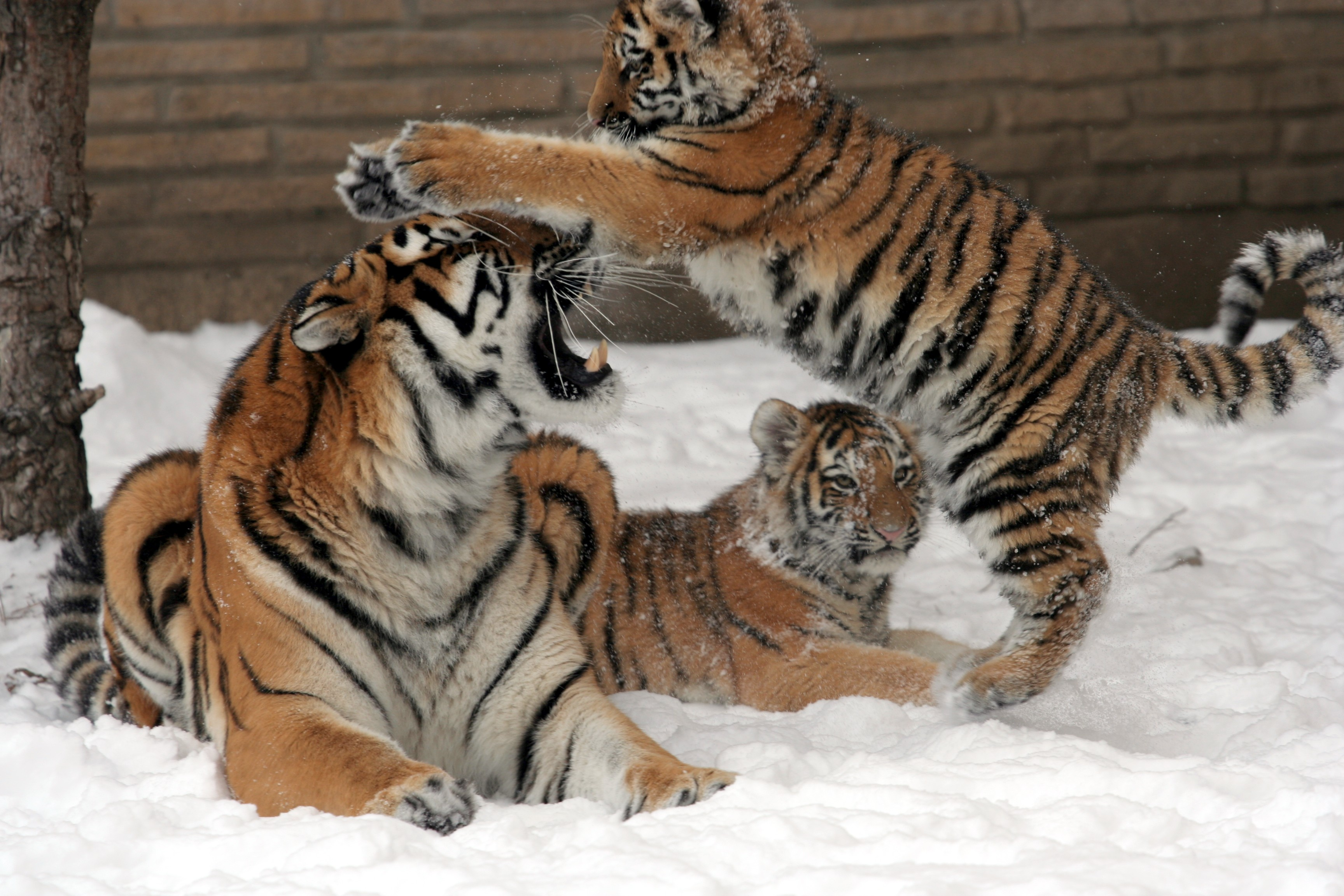
Tiger cubs playing with their mother

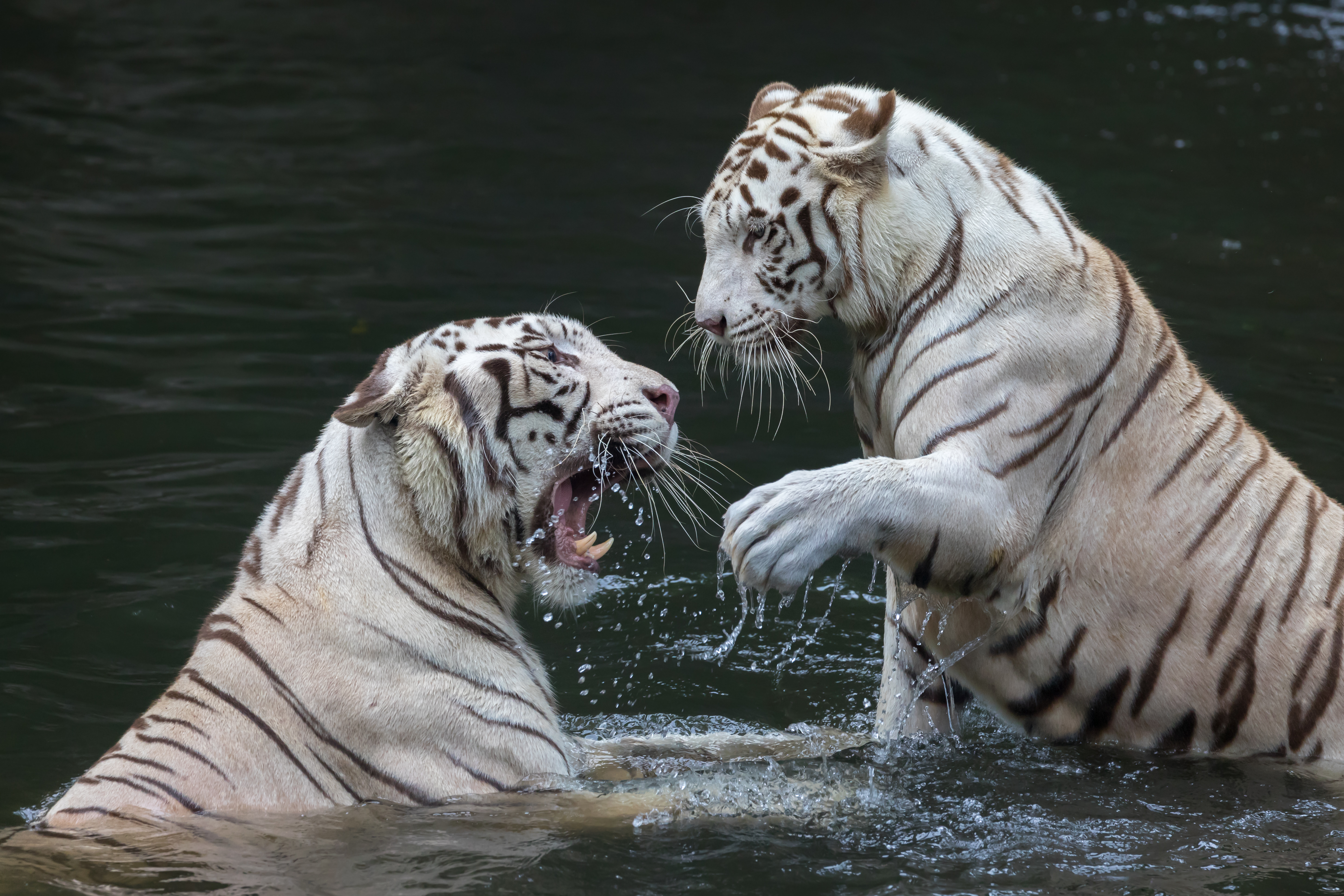
Tigers playing in water

Evolutionary psychologists believe that there must be an important benefit of play, as there are so many other reasons to avoid it; observations have shown it has arisen independently in such varied groups as mammals, birds, reptiles, amphibians, fish, and invertebrates. Animals are often injured during play, become distracted from predators, and expend valuable energy. In rare cases, play has even been observed between different species that are natural enemies such as a polar bear and a dog. Yet play seems to be a normal activity with animals who occupy the higher strata of their own hierarchy of needs. Animals on the lower strata, e.g. stressed and starving animals, generally do not play. However, in wild Assamese macaques physically active play is performed also during periods of low food availability and even if it is at the expense of growth, which highlights the developmental and evolutionary importance of play.

The social cognitive complexity of numerous species, including dogs, have been explored in experimental studies. In one such study, conducted by Alexandra Horowitz of the University of California, the communication and attention-getting skills of dogs were investigated. In a natural setting, dyadic play behavior was observed; head-direction and posture was specifically noted. When one of the two dogs was facing away or otherwise preoccupied, attention-getting behaviors and signals (nudging, barking, growling, pawing, jumping, etc.) were used by the other dog to communicate the intent and/or desire to continue on with the dyadic play. Stronger or more frequent signaling was used if the attention of the other dog was not captured. These observations tell us that these dogs know how play behavior and signaling can be used to capture attention, communicate intent and desire, and manipulate one another. This characteristic and skill, called the "attention-getting skill" has generally only been seen in humans, but is now being researched and seen in many different species.

Observing play behavior in various species can tell much about the player's environment (including the welfare of the animal), personal needs, social rank (if any), immediate relationships, and eligibility for mating. Play activity, often observed through action and signals, serves as a tool for communication and expression. Through mimicry, chasing, biting, and touching, animals act out in ways that send messages to one another; whether it's an alert, initiation of play, or expressing intent. When play behavior was observed for a study in Tonkean macaques, it was discovered that play signals weren't always used to initiate play; rather, these signals were viewed primarily as methods of communication (sharing information and attention-getting).

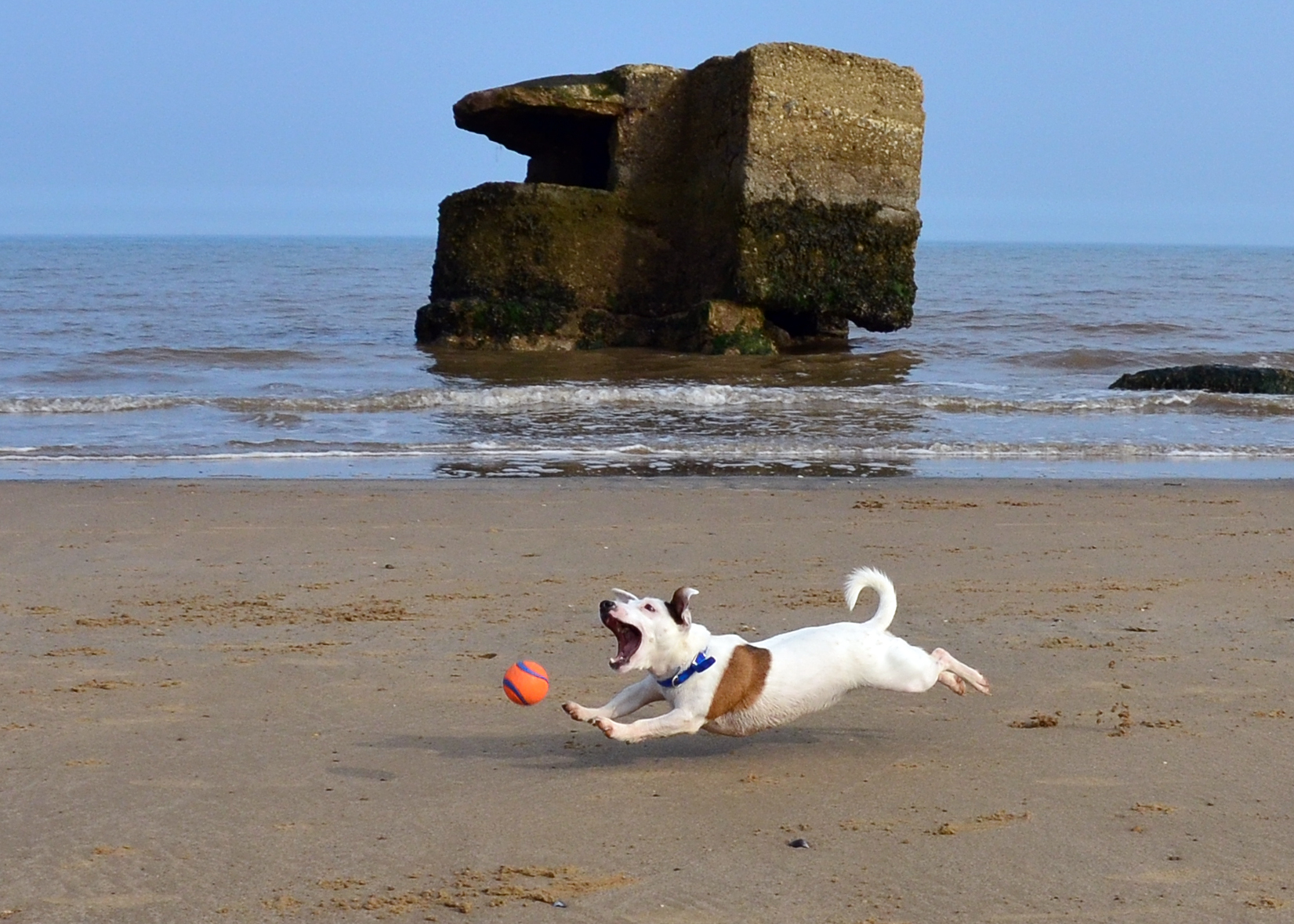
A dog plays with a ball.

One theory—"play as preparation"—was inspired by the observation that play often mimics adult themes of survival. Predators such as lions and bears play by chasing, pouncing, pawing, wrestling, and biting, as they learn to stalk and kill prey. Prey animals such as deer and zebras play by running and leaping as they acquire speed and agility. Hoofed mammals also practice kicking their hind legs to learn to ward off attacks. Indeed, time spent in physical play accelerates motor skill acquisition in wild Assamese macaques. While mimicking adult behavior, attacking actions such as kicking and biting are not completely fulfilled, so playmates do not generally injure each other. In social animals, playing might also help to establish dominance rankings among the young to avoid conflicts as adults.

John Byers, a zoologist at the University of Idaho, discovered that the amount of time spent at play for many mammals (e.g. rats and cats) peaks around puberty, and then drops off. This corresponds to the development of the cerebellum, suggesting that play is not so much about practicing exact behaviors, as much as building general connections in the brain. Sergio Pellis and colleagues at the University of Lethbridge in Alberta, Canada, discovered that play may shape the brain in other ways, too. Young mammals have an overabundance of brain cells in their cerebrum (the outer areas of the brain—part of what distinguishes mammals). There is evidence that play helps the brain clean up this excess of cells, resulting in a more efficient cerebrum at maturity.

Humans and non-human animals playing in water

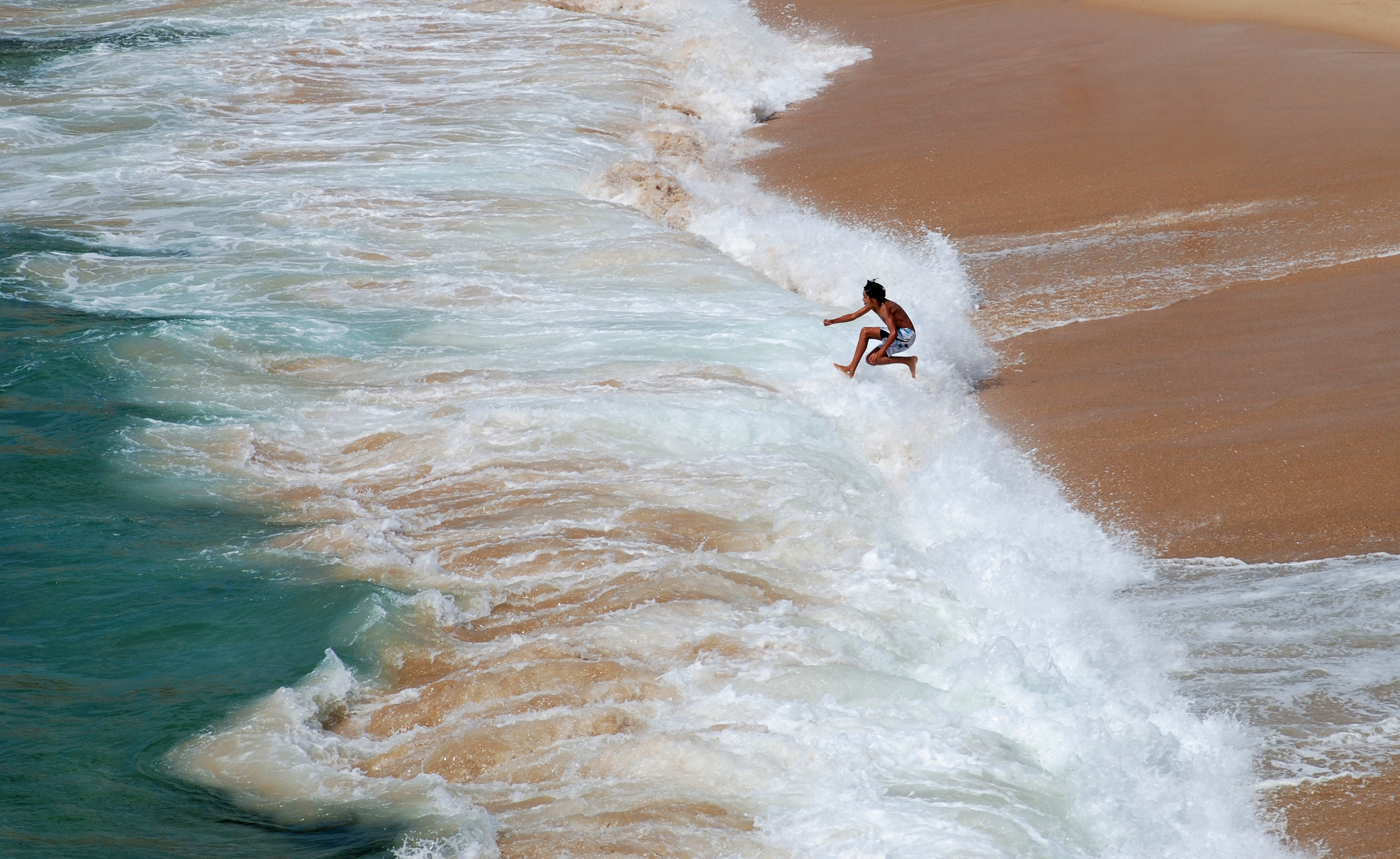
A child is seen playing in the surf, an activity that dolphins also enjoy.

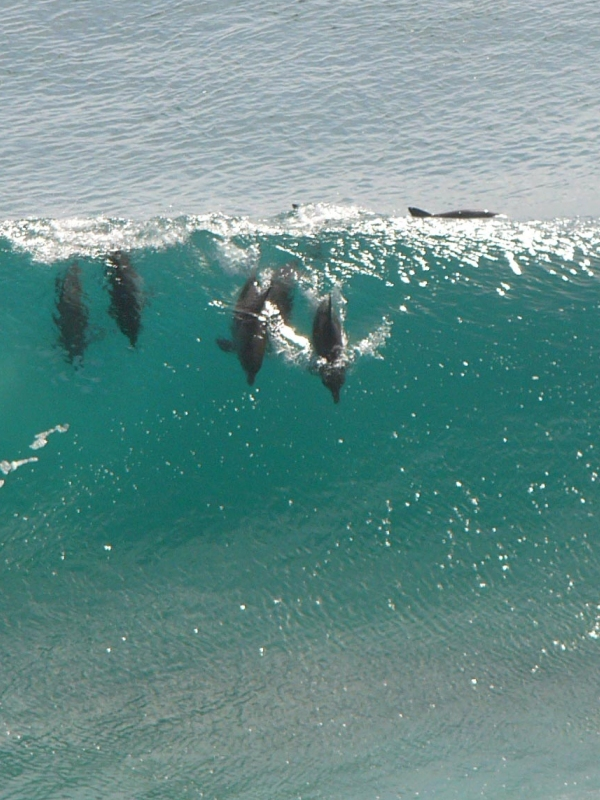
Dolphins playing

Marc Bekoff (a University of Colorado evolutionary biologist) proposes a "flexibility" hypothesis that attempts to incorporate these neurological findings. It argues that play helps animals learn to switch and improvise all behaviors more effectively, to be prepared for the unexpected. There may, however, be other ways to acquire even these benefits of play (the concept of equifinality). The social benefits of play for many animals, for example, could instead be garnered by grooming. Patrick Bateson maintains that equifinality is exactly what play teaches. In accordance with the flexibility hypothesis, play may teach animals to avoid "false endpoints". In other words, they harness the childlike tendency to keep playing with something that works "well enough", eventually allowing them to come up with something that might work better, if only in some situations. This also allows mammals to build up various skills that could come in handy in entirely novel situations.

A study on two species of monkeys Semnopithecus entellus and Macaca mulatta that came into association with each other during food provisioning by pilgrims at the Ambagarh Forest Reserve, near Jaipur, India, shows the interspecific interaction that developed between the juveniles of the two species when opportunity presented itself.

== Development and learning ==
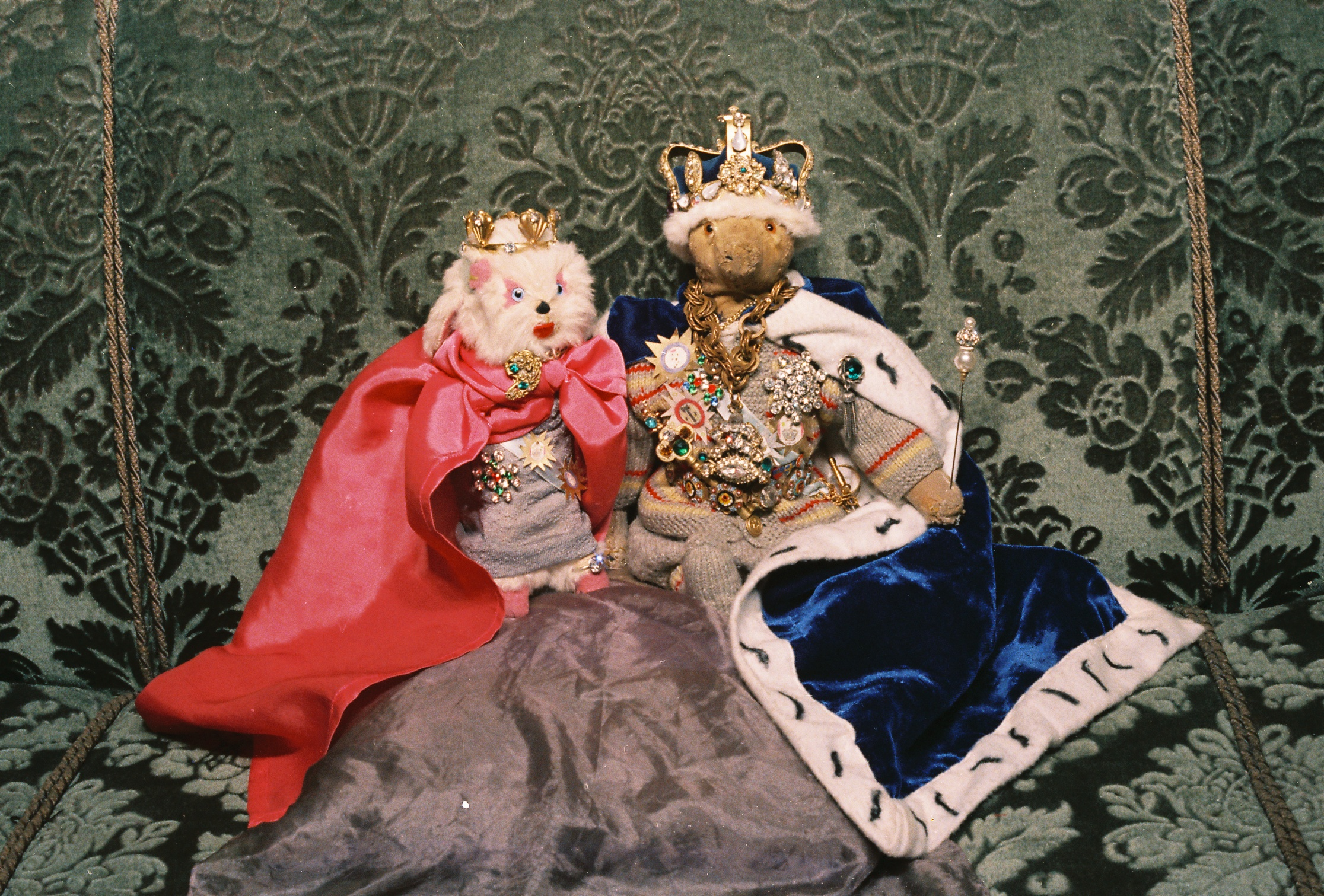
Toys are often arranged by children in extraordinary circumstances

Learning through play has been long recognized as a critical aspect of childhood and child development. Some of the earliest studies of play started in the 1890s with G. Stanley Hall, the father of the child study movement that sparked an interest in the developmental, mental, and behavioral world of babies and children. Play promotes healthy development of parent-child bonds, establishing social, emotional, and cognitive developmental milestones that help them relate to others, manage stress, and learn resiliency.

Modern research in the field of affective neuroscience (the neural mechanisms of emotion) has uncovered important links between role play and neurogenesis in the brain. For example, researcher Roger Caillois used the word ilinx to describe the momentary disruption of perception that comes from forms of physical play that disorient the senses, especially balance.

Play is positively correlated with coping with daily stressors in children. By playing, children regulate their emotions. This is important for adaptive functioning because without regulation, emotions could be overwhelming and stressful.

Evolutionary psychologists have begun to explore the phylogenetic relationship between higher intelligence in humans and its relationship to play, i.e., the relationship of play to the progress of whole evolutionary groups as opposed to the psychological implications of play to a specific individual.

=== Physical, mental and social ===
Various forms of play, physical or mental, influence cognitive abilities in individuals. As little as ten minutes of exercise (including physical play), can improve cognitive abilities. An "exergame" is a game that incorporates some physical movement but is not formal exercise. Such games increase one's heart rate to the level of aerobics exercise and result in significant improvements in mental faculties such as math and recall memory.

Playing video games is one of the most common mediums of play for children and adults today. There have been mixed reviews on the effects of video games. One study found "[playing video games] was positively associated with skills strongly related to academic success, such as time management, attention, executive control, memory, and spatial abilities—when playing video game occurs in moderation".

Play can also influence one's social development and social interactions. Much of the research focuses on the influence play has on child social development. There are different forms of play that influence child social development. One study explored the influence of playing styles with mothers versus playing styles with fathers and how it influences child social development. "[I]ntegral to positive development is the child's social competence or, more precisely, the ability to regulate their own emotions and behaviors in the social contexts of early childhood to support the effective accomplishment of relevant developmental tasks."

Social benefits of play have been measured using basic interpersonal values such as getting along with peers. Play with parents reduces anxiety in children. Having play time with parents that involves socially acceptable behaviour makes it easier for children to relate to be more socially adjusted to peers at school or at play. Social development involving child interaction with peers is thus an area of influence for playful interactions with parents and peers.

=== Anji play ===
Anji play (安吉游戏 in simplified Chinese, 安吉遊戲 in traditional Chinese) is an educational method based on children's self-directed play in outside spaces, using simple tools made of natural material. The teachers and instructors only observe and document the children's independent play. The method was created by Cheng Xueqin and is organized as two hours of free play during which the children choose the available material they want to use and build structures to play.

While planning, experimenting, building, and using the structures to play, the children have the opportunity to interact with peers, to think critically about what may work, to discuss the plan, and organize the construction work. The process is observed and recorded by the teachers and instructors without intervention, even in instances of possible risk.

Before and after the two hours of play, the children have the opportunity to express their plans and discuss with their peers. After the play, they get the opportunity to draw, write or explain what they did. Then, they watch the videos recorded the same day and explain how they played and comment on each other's creations.

Anji play is also called "true play" and its guiding principles are love, risk, joy, engagement, and reflection. This method of self-initiated and self-directed play is applied at the pre-schools (children from three to six years old) in Anji county, East China.
