= Elizabeth Shaw =

Elizabeth Shaw may refer to:

- Elizabeth Orr Shaw (1923–2014), American politician and lawyer
- Elizabeth Shaw (artist) (1920–1992), Irish artist, illustrator and children's book author
- Elizabeth M. Shaw (1928–2013), British hydrologist
- Elizabeth Shaw (confectionery company)
- Liz Shaw, a character from the television series Doctor Who
- Elizabeth Shaw (character), a character played by Noomi Rapace in the film Prometheus

== See also ==
- Elizabeth Shore, aka Jane Shore, mistress of Edward IV of England
