= Ilinx =

Kind of play activity

Ilinx is a kind of play, described by sociologist Roger Caillois, a major figure in game studies. Ilinx creates a temporary disruption of perception, as with vertigo, dizziness, or disorienting changes in direction of movement.

== Conceptual development ==
Caillois developed the concept of ilinx.

Caillois identified several categories of play in Les Jeux et Les Hommes (English title: Man, Play, and Games) Among these is ilinx, which describes the playfully altered perception or "voluptuous panic" resulting when a person subjects themself to abrupt "spasm, seizure, or shock which destroys reality with sovereign business."

Caillois's other categories, which should be considered alongside ilinx as any form of play rarely fits wholly and discretely into one category, are agon, (competition), alea (chance) and mimesis ("mimicry").

== Examples ==
Caillois uses the ilinx to describe the objective of a child who spins around in a circle to become dizzy.

Bungee jumping is an example of the experience of ilinx.
