= Soil memory =

What soils can report about a history of a place.

Soil memory describes soil as retaining a record of past natural changes, environmental conditions, and human activity. The term was coined by Nikiforoff in 1953 and echoes the earlier dictum of Vasily Dokuchaev that soil is "a mirror of the landscape". The concept provides a framework for understanding the present state of a soil as the result of its past development while, at the same time, enabling the reconstruction of past situations and events that have affected the soil and are reflected in its current condition.

== Concept ==
Soil's capacity to retain information about past processes is primarily determined by pedogenesis, soil spatial structure, and its constituent components, including mineral and organic matter, as well as climatic conditions. As a result, soils preserve information not only about their own development but also about past climatic and local ecological conditions. This information is manifested at different levels of the hierarchical organization of soil structure, ranging from individual soil horizons and morphological features to microstructures, microaggregates, and ultimately the molecular and atomic composition of the soil.

In its theoretical formulation, the concept distinguishes between two principal modes by which records are preserved. In the "palimpsest-wise" mode, characteristic of soils proper (pedomemory), successive pedogenic features are superimposed within the same soil body, so that traces of the present, recent and remote past coexist and partly overprint one another, much like a palimpsest, a reused manuscript on which earlier text has been scraped away and overwritten. In the "book-wise" mode, characteristic of stratified sedimentary deposits (lithomemory), records are stored in discrete layers stacked in chronological order, yielding higher and more exact temporal resolution. The two modes interact during pedogenesis, as the transformation of a lithomatrix into a pedomatrix progressively aggrades pedomemory features while erasing lithomemory features. The capacity of a given horizon to retain information depends on its characteristic time of formation: upper horizons respond rapidly to environmental change and are most susceptible to erasure, whereas deeper horizons carry a longer and more stable memory. The term soil memory is often used interchangeably with soil archive, and the concept is closely associated with that of soil polygenesis.

== Applications ==
The soil memory concept has been applied to investigate both natural environmental changes, such as climate evolution, and the interactions between human land use and soil development, as well as to analyze and interpret archaeological evidence preserved in prehistoric soils. The persistence of environmental DNA in cultivated soils has likewise been interpreted as a "memory effect" usable for reconstructing the dynamics of past land use and land cover.

== Microbiological dimension ==
Whereas the concept originally focused primarily on the physical composition and structure of soils and their transformation over time, increasing attention has been directed in recent years toward the composition of microbial communities as an integral component of soil organic matter. The composition of local soil microbial communities is determined both by abiotic factors and by the macroorganisms present in the environment. At the same time, many microorganisms, particularly bacteria, are capable of surviving in dormant states for extended periods, allowing them to persist in soils despite substantial environmental changes. Advances in molecular biological techniques, such as the polymerase chain reaction (PCR) and next-generation sequencing (NGS), now enable detailed characterization of microbial communities based on their DNA. Owing to the high abundance of bacteria in soils and the extraordinary diversity of soil bacterial communities, NGS-based profiling of soil bacteria is particularly well suited for characterizing present soil conditions and for identifying traces of past environmental influences.

The concept of a specifically biological (microbial) soil memory has been formalized as the ability of soil microbiota to alter their structure, functional diversity, and activity in response to natural or anthropogenic factors and to preserve those changes over time. The microbiological dimension of soil memory has been demonstrated at an Iron Age settlement site in Sicily, and in Iron Age cremation burials, where distinctive bacterial communities reflect former human activity. Similarly, the diversity and composition of soil bacterial communities have been shown to preserve signatures of medieval and early modern activity areas. Changes in the intensity of agricultural practices have been reconstructed from cyanobacteria communities in lake sediments, while characteristic bacterial communities have also been found to distinguish the infill of Neolithic enclosure ditches from the surrounding soil. These studies indicate that past human activities frequently leave lasting imprints on soil bacterial communities, consistent with the Soil Memory concept, and suggest that the microbiological characterization of archaeological soil samples may develop into an established analytical approach in archaeological research.

== Limitations ==
Reading the record stored in soil memory is subject to several inherent limitations. Because most soils are polygenetic, a younger pedogenic signal may overprint, mask, or erase an older one, so that the preserved record is partial and "censored" rather than complete. Upper horizons, being the most reactive, are especially prone to such erasure, which biases preservation toward more stable, deeper features. Interpretation is further complicated by equifinality a problem common to the historical sciences. In paleopedology the soil memory concept has accordingly been framed not as a definitive explanatory device but as an open, exploratory tool based on analogical reasoning, used to link incomplete and sometimes unrelated evidence to testable hypotheses.
