= Hydrology in Practice =

Textbook on hydrology

- Author: Elizabeth M. Shaw
- Subject: Hydrology
- Publisher: Van Nostrand Reinhold (UK) Co. Ltd.
- Publication date: 1983

Hydrology in Practice is a hydrology textbook by British hydrologist Elizabeth M. Shaw. The book was originally published in 1983 by Van Nostrand Reinhold (UK) Co. Ltd. and the most recent fourth edition was published in July 2010 by CRC Press, a division of Taylor & Francis. The book has been described as both an introductory text and a resource for professionals.

== Synopsis ==
The third edition of the book is separated into three parts which discuss hydrological measurements, hydrological analysis, and engineering applications.

== Reception ==
Hydrology in Practice has been described by CRC Press as "likely to be the course text for every undergraduate/MSc hydrology course in the UK".

The book has been reviewed by the Quarterly Journal of the Royal Meteorological Society, the Journal of the American Water Resources Association, the Hydrological Sciences Journal, and the Journal of Hydrology, along with being cited in many scientific journals. In a review of the third edition, the Hydrological Sciences Journal described the book as "an excellent compendium of techniques and methods of hydrological measurement and data analysis". The book is also recommended reading at Dartmouth College, Utah State University, the University of Malta, the American Institute of Hydrology, and the Polytechnic University of Catalonia, among others.

== Editions ==
- Shaw, Elizabeth M., Hydrology in Practice, 1st Edition, 1983, Taylor & Francis or Van Nostrand Reinhold
- Shaw, Elizabeth M., Hydrology in Practice, 2nd Edition, 1988, Taylor & Francis or imprints
- Shaw, Elizabeth M., Hydrology in Practice, 3rd Edition, 1994, Taylor & Francis or Chapman & Hall
- Shaw, Elizabeth, M., Keith J. Beven, Nick A. Chappell, Rob Lamb, 2010, Hydrology in Practice, 4th Edition, CRC Press. ISBN 978-0415370424
