= Degeneracy (biology) =

Process in biology

Within biological systems, degeneracy occurs when structurally dissimilar components/pathways can perform similar functions (i.e. are effectively interchangeable) under certain conditions, but perform distinct functions in other conditions. Degeneracy is thus a relational property that requires comparing the behavior of two or more components. In particular, if degeneracy is present in a pair of components, then there will exist conditions where the pair will appear functionally redundant but other conditions where they will appear functionally distinct.

This use of the term has practically no relevance to the questionably meaningful concept of evolutionarily degenerate populations that have lost ancestral functions.

== Biological examples ==
Examples of degeneracy are found in the genetic code, when many different nucleotide sequences encode the same polypeptide; in protein folding, when different polypeptides fold to be structurally and functionally equivalent; in protein functions, when overlapping binding functions and similar catalytic specificities are observed; in metabolism, when multiple, parallel biosynthetic and catabolic pathways may coexist. More generally, degeneracy is observed in proteins of every functional class (e.g. enzymatic, structural, or regulatory), protein complex assemblies, ontogenesis, the nervous system, cell signalling (crosstalk) and numerous other biological contexts.

== Contribution to robustness ==
Degeneracy contributes to the robustness of biological traits through several mechanisms. Degenerate components compensate for one another under conditions where they are functionally redundant, thus providing robustness against component or pathway failure. Because degenerate components are somewhat different, they tend to harbor unique sensitivities so that a targeted attack such as a specific inhibitor is less likely to present a risk to all components at once. There are numerous biological examples where degeneracy contributes to robustness in this way. For instance, gene families can encode for diverse proteins with many distinctive roles yet sometimes these proteins can compensate for each other during lost or suppressed gene expression, as seen in the developmental roles of the adhesins gene family in Saccharomyces. Nutrients can be metabolized by distinct metabolic pathways that are effectively interchangeable for certain metabolites even though the total effects of each pathway are not identical. In cancer, therapies targeting the EGF receptor are thwarted by the co-activation of alternate receptor tyrosine kinases (RTK) that have partial functional overlap with the EGF receptor (and are therefore degenerate), but are not targeted by the same specific EGF receptor inhibitor.

== Theory ==
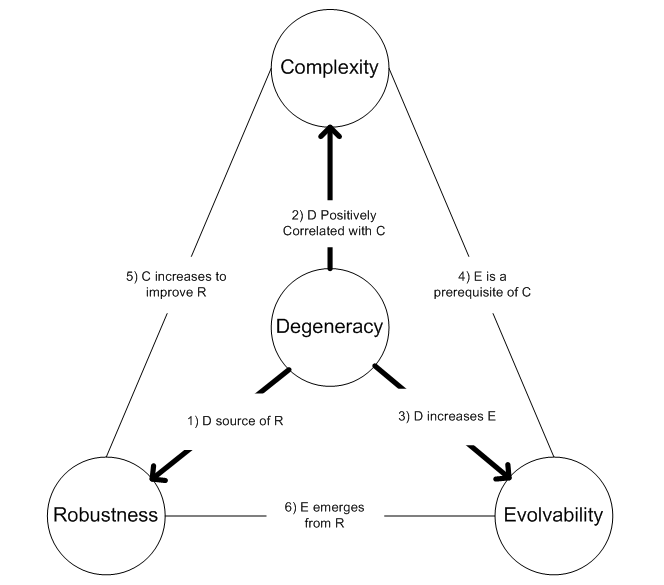
Theoretical relationships between biological properties that are important to evolution. For a review of evidence that supports these relationships, see.

Several theoretical developments have outlined links between degeneracy and important biological measurements related to robustness, complexity, and evolvability. These include:

- Theoretical arguments supported by simulations have proposed that degeneracy can lead to distributed forms of robustness in protein interaction networks. Those authors suggest that similar phenomena is likely to arise in other biological networks and potentially may contribute to the resilience of ecosystems as well.
- Tononi et al. have found evidence that degeneracy is inseparable from the existence of hierarchical complexity in neural populations. They argue that the link between degeneracy and complexity is likely to be much more general.
- Fairly abstract simulations have supported the hypothesis that degeneracy fundamentally alters the propensity for a genetic system to access novel heritable phenotypes and that degeneracy could therefore be a precondition for open-ended evolution.
- The three hypotheses above have been integrated in where they propose that degeneracy plays a central role in the open-ended evolution of biological complexity. In the same article, it was argued that the absence of degeneracy within many designed (abiotic) complex systems may help to explain why robustness appears to be in conflict with flexibility and adaptability, as seen in software, systems engineering, and artificial life.

== See also ==
- Canalisation
- Equifinality
