= Man, Play and Games =

1961 book by Roger Caillois

- Title page for Les jeux et les hommes (1967 edition)
- Author: Roger Caillois
- Original title: Les jeux et les hommes
- Language: French
- Genre: Non-fiction
- Publication date: 1958
- English publication date: 1961
- ISBN: 0029052009

Man, Play and Games (ISBN 0029052009) is the influential 1961 book by the French sociologist Roger Caillois (French: Les jeux et les hommes, 1958) on the sociology of play and games or, in Caillois' terms, sociology derived from play. Caillois interprets many social structures as elaborate forms of games and much behaviour as a form of play.

== Summary ==
=== Definition ===
Caillois builds critically on the theories of Johan Huizinga, adding a more comprehensive review of play forms. Caillois disputes Huizinga's emphasis on competition in play. He also notes the considerable difficulty in defining play, concluding that play is best described by six core characteristics:

- It is free, or not obligatory.
- It is separate (from the routine of life), occupying its own time and space.
- It is uncertain, so that the results of play cannot be pre-determined and so that the player's initiative is involved.
- It is unproductive in that it creates no wealth and ends as it begins.
- It is governed by rules that suspend ordinary laws and behaviours and that must be followed by players.
- It involves make-believe that confirms for players the existence of imagined realities that may be set against 'real life'.

Caillois focuses on the last two characteristics, rules and make-believe. According to Caillois, they "may be related" but are mutually exclusive: "Games are not ruled and make-believe. Rather, they are ruled or make-believe."

=== Forms of Play ===
Caillois argues that we can understand the complexity of games by referring to four play forms and two types of play (ludus and paidia):

- Agon, or competition. E.g. Chess is an almost purely agonistic game. In this form of play, the players have equal chances but the winner succeeds because of "a single quality (speed, endurance, strength, memory, skill, ingenuity, etc.), exercised, within defined limits and without outside assistance." Agon prioritizes skill, work, and professionalization.
- Alea, or chance. In contrast to agon, games of alea depend on chance and fortune. Alea negates skill and highlights "a surrender to destiny".
- Mimicry, or mimesis, or role playing.
- Ilinx (Greek for "whirlpool"), which Caillois describes as "voluptuous panic" in the sense of altering perception by experiencing a strong emotion (panic, fear, ecstasy) the stronger the emotion is, the stronger the sense of excitement and fun becomes. E.g. bungee jumping or Caillois' example of children spinning in a circle until they become dizzy.

=== Examples ===
Games and play combine these elements in various ways. Examples:

- Poker features both alea, the random shuffling of cards, and agon, the strategic decisions of discarding cards and betting.
- Collectible card games combine alea (the random shuffling of decks and the distribution of cards in booster packs), agon (competition with rules and strategies) and mimesis (cards refer to imaginary beings the player controls in a fictional world).
- Dancing is an ilinx activity, which can be combined with mimesis to portray characters, or with agon in competitive dance.
- Spectator sports combine the agon of the players with mimesis on the part of the spectators, who self-insert and identify with certain players on the field.

=== Structure ===
Caillois also places forms of play on a continuum from ludus, structured activities with explicit rules (games), to paidia, unstructured and spontaneous activities (playfulness), although in human affairs the tendency is always to turn paidia into ludus, and that established rules are also subject to the pressures of paidia. It is this process of rule-forming and re-forming that may be used to account for the apparent instability of cultures.

Caillois also emphasizes that paidia and alea cannot coexist, as games of chance are inherently games of restraint and waiting for an external event. Likewise, ludus and ilinx are incompatible, as there are no structured rules in the state of disorientation; any rules applied are solely to put a brake on the ilinx so as not to turn it into panic.

Like Huizinga, Caillois sees a tendency for a corruption of the values of play in modern society as well as for play to be institutionalised in the structures of society. For example, agon is seen as a cultural form in sports, in an institutional form as economic competition and as a corruption in violence and trickery; Alea is seen as a cultural form in lotteries and casinos, as an institutional form in the stock market and as a corruption in superstition and astrology; mimicry is seen as cultural form in carnivals and theatre, as institutional form in uniforms and ceremonies and as corruption in forms of alienation; and ilinx is seen as cultural form in climbing and skiing, as institutional form in professionals requiring control of vertigo and as corruption in drugs and alcoholism.
