= Keith Beven =

British hydrologist (born 1950)

Keith Beven FRS
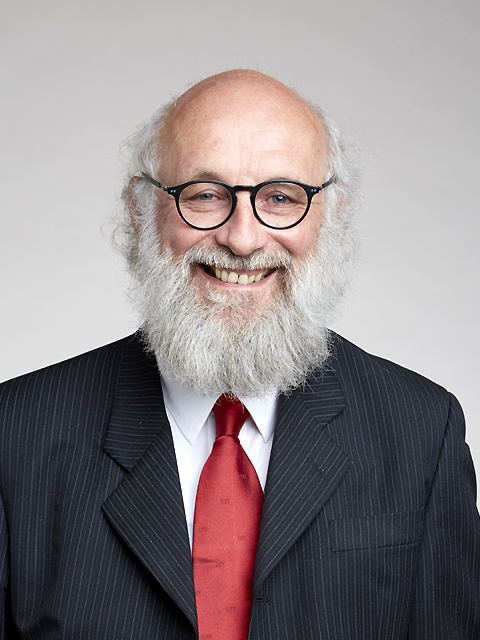
- Beven in 2017
- Born: 23 July 1950 (age 76); Barnehurst, Kent, England
- Education: Chislehurst and Sidcup Grammar School; University of Bristol; University of East Anglia
- Known for: Generalised likelihood uncertainty estimation (GLUE)
- Awards: Robert E. Horton Medal (2012)
- Scientific career
- Fields: Hydrology
- Workplaces: Lancaster University; University of Virginia
- Thesis: A Deterministic Spatially Distributed Model of Catchment Hydrology (1975)
- Doctoral advisor: Keith Clayton
- Website: Official website

Keith John Beven FRS (born 23 July 1950) is a British hydrologist and distinguished emeritus professor in hydrology at Lancaster University. According to Lancaster University he is the most highly cited hydrologist.

In 2017, Beven was elected a member of the National Academy of Engineering for contributions to the understanding of hydrological processes and development of the foundations of modern hydrological modeling.

== Education ==
Beven was educated at Chislehurst and Sidcup Grammar School, graduated with a Bachelor of Science degree in geography from the University of Bristol in 1971 and was awarded a PhD from the University of East Anglia (UEA) in 1975 for research on catchment hydrology supervised by Keith Clayton.

== Career and research ==
Beven worked at the University of Leeds (1974–1977) and the Institute of Hydrology, Wallingford (1977–1979 and 1982–1985). He was an assistant professor at the University of Virginia from 1979 to 1982 and joined Lancaster University in 1985. He has held visiting positions at the University of California, Santa Barbara (1996) and École Polytechnique Fédérale de Lausanne (EPFL), Lausanne, Switzerland (1997); KU Leuven, Belgium (1999–2000) and Uppsala University and the Swedish University of Agricultural Sciences (SLU) Uppsala, Sweden as Konung Carl XVI Gustafs Gästprofessor i Miljövetenskap in 2006–2007.

His main research interests are in hydrological modelling and understanding the prediction uncertainties associated with environmental models. He was the originator with Mike Kirkby of the TOPMODEL Concepts and the originator of the Generalised Likelihood Uncertainty Estimation (GLUE) methodology. GLUE has been applied to a wide variety of fields including rainfall-runoff modelling, flood inundation, water quality modelling, sediment transport, recharge and groundwater modelling, vegetation growth models, aphid populations, forest fire and tree death modelling. He is working on novel modelling of flow and transport on hillslopes and in catchments, modelling the impacts of climate and land management on flood runoff and flood frequency, nonparametric estimation of the rainfall-flow nonlinearity, and flood forecasting. He has published 10 books and over 350 peer reviewed papers.

=== Awards and honours ===
Beven has received several awards and honours including:

- Elected a Fellow of the Royal Society in 2017, the first hydrologist elected since Charles Pereira in 1969
- Foreign member of the US National Academy of Engineering (2017)
- Horton Award of the American Geophysical Union (1991)
- Fellow of the American Geophysical Union (1995)
- John Dalton Medal of the European Geophysical Society (2001)
- Linnaeus Lecture Award at Uppsala University (2002)
- Langbein Lecture Award of the American Geophysical Union (2004)
- King Carl XVI Gustaf Professorship in Environmental Science (2006)
- International Association of Hydrological Sciences (IAHS)/World Meteorological Organization (WMO) /UNESCO International Hydrology Prize (2009)
- Robert E. Horton Medal of the American Geophysical Union (2012)
- President's Prize of the British Hydrological Society (2013)
- Honorary DSc, University of Bristol (2015)

=== Publications ===
- K.J. Beven and P. Carling (Eds.). 1989. Floods: hydrological sedimentological and geomorphological implications. Wiley, Chichester (ISBN 0-471-92164-5).
- K.J. Beven and I.D. Moore (Eds.). 1992. Terrain Analysis and Distributed Modelling in Hydrology. Wiley, Chichester (ISBN 0-471-93886-6)
- K.J. Beven and M.J. Kirkby (Eds.). 1993. Channel Network Hydrology. Wiley, Chichester. (ISBN 0-471-93534-4)
- K.J. Beven, P.C. Chatwin and J.H. Millbank (Eds.). 1994. Mixing and Transport in the Environment. Wiley, Chichester. (ISBN 0-471-94142-5)
- K.J. Beven. (Ed.), 1997. Distributed Modelling in Hydrology: Applications of TOPMODEL. Wiley, Chichester. (ISBN 0-471-97724-1)
- K.J. Beven. 2001. Rainfall-Runoff Modelling: The Primer. Wiley, Chichester (ISBN 0-471-98553-8
- K.J. Beven. 2006. Benchmark papers in Streamflow Generation Processes. IAHS Press, Wallingford, UK (with selection, introduction and commentaries on papers) (ISBN 1-901502-53-8)
- K.J. Beven, 2009. Environmental Modelling: An Uncertain Future? Routledge: London (ISBN 978-0-415-46302-7) http://www.uncertain-future.org.uk
- E.M. Shaw, K.J. Beven, N.A. Chappell and R. Lamb. 2010. Hydrology in Practice, 4th Edition, Spon: London. (ISBN 978-0-415-37041-7)
- K.J. Beven. 2011. Mallerstang Magic: Images of the Mallerstang Valley. Blurb Books, 36pp small format or large format
- K.J. Beven. 2012. Mallerstang in Panorama: Panoramic Images of the Mallerstang Valley. Blurb Books, 42pp small format or large format
- K.J. Beven. 2012. Mallerstang in Mono: Black and White Images of the Mallerstang Valley. Blurb Books. 50pp small format or large format
- K.J. Beven. 2012. Rainfall-Runoff Modelling: The Primer (2nd Edition). Wiley-Blackwell: Chichester, UK. ISBN 978-0-470-71459-1
- K.J. Beven and J.W. Hall (Eds.). 2014. Applied Uncertainty Analysis for Flood Risk Management. World Scientific: Singapore.ISBN 978-1-84816-270-9
