= Equifinality =

Principle in systems theory

Equifinality is the principle that in open systems a given end state can be reached by many potential means. The term and concept is due to the German Hans Driesch, the developmental biologist, later applied by the Austrian Ludwig von Bertalanffy, the founder of general systems theory, and by William T. Powers, the founder of perceptual control theory. Driesch and von Bertalanffy prefer this term, in contrast to "goal", in describing complex systems' similar or convergent behavior. Powers simply emphasised the flexibility of response, since it emphasizes that the same end state may be achieved via many different paths or trajectories.

In closed systems, a direct cause-and-effect relationship exists between the initial condition and the final state of the system: When a computer's 'on' switch is pushed, the system powers up. Open systems (such as biological and social systems), however, operate quite differently. The idea of equifinality suggests that similar results may be achieved with different initial conditions and in many different ways. This phenomenon has also been referred to as isotelesis (from Greek ἴσος isos "equal" and τέλεσις telesis: "the intelligent direction of effort toward the achievement of an end") when in games involving superrationality.

== Overview ==
In business, equifinality implies that firms may establish similar competitive advantages based on substantially different competencies.

In psychology, equifinality refers to how different early experiences in life (e.g., parental divorce, physical abuse, parental substance abuse) can lead to similar outcomes (e.g., childhood depression). In other words, there are many different early experiences that can lead to the same psychological disorder.

In archaeology, equifinality refers to how different historical processes may lead to a similar outcome or social formation. For example, the development of agriculture or the bow and arrow occurred independently in many different areas of the world, yet for different reasons and through different historical trajectories. This highlights that generalizations based on cross-cultural comparisons cannot be made uncritically.

=== Model equifinality ===
In earth and environmental sciences, two general types of equifinality are distinguished: process equifinality (concerned with real-world open systems) and model equifinality (concerned with conceptual open systems). For example, process equifinality in geomorphology indicates that similar landforms might arise as a result of quite different sets of processes. Model equifinality refers to a condition where distinct configurations of model components (e.g. distinct model parameter values) can lead to similar or equally acceptable simulations (or representations of the real-world process of interest). This similarity or equal acceptability is conditional on the objective functions and criteria of acceptability defined by the modeler. While model equifinality has various facets, model parameter and structural equifinality are mostly known and focused in modeling studies. Equifinality (particularly parameter equifinality) and Monte Carlo experiments are the foundation of the GLUE method that was the first generalised method for uncertainty assessment in hydrological modeling. GLUE is now widely used within and beyond environmental modeling.

== See also ==
- Consilience
- Convergent evolution
- Degeneracy (biology)
- GLUE – Generalized likelihood uncertainty estimation (when modeling environmental systems there are many different model structures and parameter sets that may be behavioural or acceptable in reproducing the behaviour of that system)
- Kruskal's principle
- Multicollinearity
- Multiple realizability
- Teleonomy
- TMTOWTDI – Computer programming maxim: "there is more than one way to do it"
- Underdetermination
