= Elizabeth M. Shaw =

British hydrologist (1928–2013)

- Born: Elizabeth Mary Shaw; 14 February 1928; Hebburn
- Died: April 25, 2013 (aged 85); Hornby
- Scientific career
- Fields: Hydrology; Meteorology
- Workplaces: Imperial College, London

Elizabeth Mary Shaw (14 February 1928 – 25 April 2013) was a British hydrologist and author of the popular textbook Hydrology in Practice.

== Life and education ==
Elizabeth Shaw was born at Hebburn on Tyne, UK, in 1928. In her childhood, she lived and went to school in Durham, UK. She gained her bachelor's degree in Geography from Bedford College in London, in 1949. In 1953 she began a postgraduate course in hydrology at Durham University, during which she spent two years measuring rainfall and run-off over the Upper Weardale catchment where she lived.

She died 25 April 2013.

== Career and research ==
From 1955–60 Elizabeth Shaw worked as a research assistant at Bedford College under Professor Gordon Manley. Here she worked on calculating meteorological series, using a (then new) Facit Hand Calculating Machine, contributing to the Central England temperature record that continues today to form the longest series of monthly temperature observations in existence. From 1960–63 she was a researcher at Keele University, working with Professor Stanley Beaver. Later, from 1963–65 she worked as a hydrologist at the Devon River Board at Exeter, and started to gain international recognition, including being one of only two women to give papers at a WMO International Conference in Quebec, Canada.

Elizabeth Shaw became a lecturer at Imperial College, London in 1965, as featured on the history page of the Environmental and Water Resource Engineering Department. There, she worked with Professor Peter Wolf as part of the hydrology section (formed in 1956) of the Civil Engineering Department. Shaw was recruited as the department started to award master's degrees in hydrology, starting 1964–65. At Imperial, she developed new analytical techniques to design rain gauge networks for accurate estimation of areal average rainfall.

Elizabeth Shaw's life and work is featured in the History of Hydrology Wiki.

== Hydrology in Practice ==
Elizabeth Shaw's greatest career achievement was as author of the popular textbook "Hydrology in practice", first published in 1983 and now in its fourth edition. The textbook covers hydrological measurements, analysis, modeling and applications, and is aimed at hydrology students in engineering and practice, particularly in the UK. It includes methods for use of the Flood Estimation Handbook, that offers guidance from the Centre for Ecology and Hydrology on standard methods for rainfall and river flood frequency estimation in the UK.

The textbook is described by the publisher as "likely to be the course text for every undergraduate/MSc hydrology course in the UK". The third edition was described as "an excellent compendium of techniques and methods of hydrological measurement and data analysis" in a review published by Hydrological Sciences Journal. It was also reviewed by the Quarterly Journal of the Royal Meteorological Society and the Journal of Hydrology, and the textbook is featured by the History of Hydrology Wiki. Hydrology in Practice is widely used and recommended by universities and academic institutions, for example being suggested as an exam reference by the American Institute of Hydrology, and recommended as a hydrology reading highlight by Dartmouth College.
