= Roger Caillois =

French author and philosopher (1913–1978)

- Born: 3 March 1913; Reims, France
- Died: 21 December 1978 (aged 65); Paris, France
- Occupations: Sociologist, ludologist
- Writing career
- Notable awards: Grand Prix de Littérature Policière; Marcel Proust Awards; European Union Prize for Literature

Roger Caillois (French: [ʁɔʒe kajwa]; 3 March 1913 – 21 December 1978) was a French intellectual and prolific writer whose original work brought together literary criticism, sociology, poetry, ludology and philosophy by focusing on very diverse subjects such as games, surrealism, south-American literature, the mineral world, dreams and images, ethnology, the history of religions and the sacred. He was also instrumental in introducing Latin American authors such as Jorge Luis Borges, Pablo Neruda and Miguel Ángel Asturias to the French public. After his death, the French Literary award Prix Roger Caillois was named after him in 1991.

== Biography ==
Caillois was born in Reims in 1913 which he left for Paris at the age of 16. There he completed his secondary studies at the Lycée Louis-le-Grand, an elite school where students prepared for entry examinations to France's most prestigious École Normale Supérieure. Caillois' efforts paid off: he graduated as a normalien in 1933 before entering the École Pratique des Hautes Études, where he came into contact with such eminent linguists as Georges Dumézil and Alexandre Kojève. During these formative years Caillois extended his circle of friends that came to include many influential figures of the French intelligentsia like André Breton, Jacques Lacan, Michel Leiris or George Bataille.

The years before the war were marked by Caillois' increasingly leftist political commitment, particularly in his fight against fascism. He was also engaged in Paris' avant-garde intellectual life. With Georges Bataille he founded the College of Sociology, a group of intellectuals who lectured regularly to one another. Formed partly as a reaction to the Surrealist movement that was dominant in the 1920s, the college sought to move away from surrealism's focus on the fantasy life of an individual's unconscious and focus instead more on the power of ritual and other aspects of communal life. Caillois' background in anthropology and sociology, and particularly his interest in the sacred, exemplified this approach.

In June 1939, at the invitation of Victoria Ocampo whom he had met in Paris a few months earlier and with whom he engaged a close, life-long amorous friendship, Caillois left France for Argentina, where the start of World War II forced him to stay. There he played an active role against the spread of Nazism in Latin America through his conferences and his contributions to anti-fascist magazines such as Sur and Les Volontaires and as editor of the new periodical Lettres françaises.

Back to Paris in 1945, he persuades the publisher Gaston Gallimard to create a collection of books translated from contemporary Latin American authors; this will be La Croix du Sud which he directs as founding editor, and will play a key role in introducing authors such as Jorge Luis Borges, Alejo Carpentier and Pablo Neruda to the French-speaking public. In 1948 he is recruited by UNESCO - where he will retire 25 years later at the age of 60 - and begins to travel widely.

He finds the time to conduct serious, personal research on a broad range of subjects and publishes widely, receiving increasing praise and recognition in literary circles: among his most notable books Les jeux et les hommes (1958) translated to English by Meyer Barash in 1961 as Man, Play and Games, Puissances du rêve (1962), Pierres (1966), Cases d'un échiquier (1970).

In 1971 he is elected to the Académie française and publishes in 1978 a powerful 'imaginary' autobiography, Le fleuve Alphée an award-winning autobiographical essay (Marcel Proust Awards and European Union Prize for Literature).

Roger Caillois died in Paris on 21 December 1978, aged 65, following a brain hemorrhage.

Today Caillois is also remembered for founding in 1952 Diogenes, an interdisciplinary quarterly journal edited in French, Spanish and English with initial funding by UNESCO and still published to this day. He is also widely cited in the nascent field of ludology, primarily from passages in his book Les Jeux et les hommes (1958).

== Key ideas on play ==
Caillois built critically on an earlier theory of play developed by the Dutch cultural historian Johan Huizinga in his book Homo Ludens (1938). Huizinga had discussed the importance of play as an element of culture and society. He used the term "Play Theory" to define the conceptual space in which play occurs, and argued that play is a necessary (though not sufficient) condition for the generation of culture.

Caillois began his own book Man, Play and Games (1961) with Huizinga's definition of play:

Summing up the formal characteristics of play we might call it a free activity standing quite consciously outside "ordinary" life as being "not serious," but at the same time absorbing the player intensely and utterly. It is an activity connected with no material interest, and no profit can be gained by it. It proceeds within its own proper boundaries of time and space according to fixed rules and in an orderly manner. It promotes the formation of social groupings which tend to surround themselves with secrecy and to stress their difference from the common world by disguise or other means.

Caillois disputed Huizinga's emphasis on competition in play. He also noted the considerable difficulty in arriving at a comprehensive definition of play, concluding that play is best described by six core characteristics:

1. it is free, or not obligatory
2. it is separate from the routine of life, occupying its own time and space
3. it is uncertain, so that the results of play cannot be pre-determined and the player's initiative is involved
4. it is unproductive in that it creates no wealth, and ends as it begins economically speaking
5. it is governed by rules that suspend ordinary laws and behaviours and that must be followed by players
6. it involves make-believe that may be set against 'real life'.

Caillois focuses on the last two characteristics, rules and make-believe. According to Caillois, they "may be related" but are mutually exclusive: "Games are not ruled and make-believe. Rather, they are ruled or make-believe."

Caillois' definition has itself been criticized by subsequent thinkers; and ultimately, despite Caillois' attempt at a definitive treatment, definitions of play remain open to negotiation.

Caillois distinguished four categories of games:

- Agon, or competition. In this form of play, the players have equal chances but the winner succeeds because of "a single quality (speed, endurance, strength, memory, skill, ingenuity, etc.), exercised, within defined limits and without outside assistance." Agon prioritizes skill, work, and professionalization.
- Alea, or chance. In contrast to agon, games of alea depend on chance and fortune. Alea negates skill and highlights "a surrender to destiny".
- Mimesis, or mimicry, or role playing Caillois defines it as "When the individual plays to believe, to make himself or others believe that he is different from himself." E.g. playing an online role-playing game.
- Ilinx, which Caillois describes as "voluptuous panic" in the sense of altering perception by experiencing a strong emotion (panic, fear, ecstasy) the stronger the emotion is, the stronger the sense of excitement and fun becomes. E.g. bungee jumping or Caillois's example of children spinning in a circle until they become dizzy.

It has been noted that these categories may be combined to create more complex forms of play. For example, poker can be understood as a combination of Agon and Alea: Alea is present in the random distribution of cards and their combinations, while Agon is reflected in strategic elements such as bluffing, in which players attempt to influence opponents' decisions by raising bets and applying pressure, making it possible to win without necessarily holding the strongest hand.

Caillois also described a dualistic polarity within which the four categories of games can be variously located:

- Paidia or uncontrolled fantasy, spontaneous play through improvisation, the rules of which are created during playing time. E.g. concerts and festivals.
- Ludus which requires effort, patience, skill, or ingenuity, the rules are set from the beginning and the game was designed before playing time. E.g. the Chinese game of Go.

Caillois disagreed particularly with Huizinga's treatment of gambling. Huizinga had argued in Homo Ludens that the risk of death or of losing money corrupts the freedom of "pure play". Thus to Huizinga, card-games are not play but "deadly earnest business". Moreover, Huizinga considered gambling to be a "futile activity" which inflicts damage on society. Thus Huizinga argued that gambling is a corruption of a more original form of play.

Against this, Caillois argued that gambling is a true game, a mode of play that falls somewhere between games of skill or competition and games of chance (i.e. between the Agon and Alea categories). Whether or not a game involves money or a risk of death, it can be considered a form of Agon or Alea as long as it provides social activity and triumph for the winner. Gambling is "like a combat in which equality of chances is artificially created, in order that adversaries should confront each other under ideal conditions, susceptible of giving precise and incontestable value to the winner’s triumph."

== Interest in mimicry ==
When Caillois worked with Bataille at the College of Sociology, they worked on two essays on insects in the 1930s: ‘La mante religieuse. De la biologie à la psychanalyse’ (1934) and ‘Mimétisme et la psychasthénie légendaire’ (1935) Caillois identifies "the praying mantis and mimicking animals as nature’s automatons and masquerades." He formulates "in his peculiarly naturalist fashion what it would mean to act and create without the intervention of the sovereign ego, that magnificent artifact of the modern West that surrealism and the avant-garde have taken such drastic measures to counteract." These articles "might read like two obscurantist entomological studies that, in a way some would describe as bizarre, try to contradict all evolutionary explications for animal cannibalism and mimicry. Their publication in the context of [the surrealist journal] Minotaure makes it possible to see them as the search for figures that evidence the possibility of intelligence without thought, creativity without art, and agency in the absence of the (human) agent."

== Roger Caillois French Literary Prize ==
The Roger Caillois French Literary Prize for Latin American Literature was created in 1991 and has also been awarded to figures such as Carlos Fuentes, José Donoso and Adolfo Bioy Casares.

== Published works ==
- The Saragossa Manuscript by Jan Potocki, ed. and preface by Roger Caillois, trans. Elisabeth Abbott. New York, Orion Press, 1960.
- Man and the Sacred, trans. Meyer Barash. New York, Free Press of Glencoe, 1960.
- Man, Play and Games, trans. Meyer Barash. New York, Free Press of Glencoe, 1961.
- The Dream Adventure, ed. Roger Caillois. New York, Orion Press, 1963.
- The Mask of Medusa. New York, C.N. Potter, 1964.
- The Dream and Human Societies, ed. Roger Caillois and G. E. Von Grunebaum. Berkeley, University of California Press, 1966.
- L'ecriture des pierres. Geneve, Editions d'Art Albert Skira, 1970.
- Le champ des signes: récurrences dérobées: aperçu sur l'unité et la continuité du monde physique intellectuel et imaginaire ou premiers éléments d'une poétique généralisée, with 25 illustrations by Estève. Paris, Hermann, 1978.
- La Nécessité d’esprit. Editions Gallimard, 1981. Trans. The Necessity of the Mind, The Lapis Press, 1990.
- The Mystery Novel, trans. Roberto Yahni and A.W. Sadler. New York, Laughing Buddha Press, 1984.
- The Writing of Stones, with an introduction by Marguerite Yourcenar. Charlottesville, University of Virginia Press, 1985.
- The Edge of Surrealism: A Roger Caillois Reader, ed. Claudine Frank, trans. Claudine Frank and Camille Naish. Durham, Duke University Press, 2003.
- Pontius Pilate: A Novel, trans. Charles Lam Markmann, with an introduction by Ivan Strenski. Charlottesville, University of Virginia Press, 2006.
