= Agon =

Ancient Greek personification of struggle or competition

Agon (Ancient Greek: Ἀγών) is the Greek deity who personified conflict, struggle or contest. This could be a contest in athletics, in chariot or horse racing, or in music or literature at a public festival in ancient Greece. Agon is the word-forming element in 'agony', explaining the concept of agon(y) in tragedy by its fundamental characters, the protagonist and antagonist.

== Athletics ==
In one sense, agon meant a contest or a competition in athletics, for example, the Olympic Games (Ὀλυμπιακοὶ Ἀγῶνες). Agon was also a mythological personification of these kinds of contest. This god was represented in a statue at Olympia with halteres (dumbbells) (ἁλτῆρες) in his hands. This statue was a work of sculptor Dionysius, and dedicated by Micythus of Rhegium.

== Religion ==
According to Pausanias, Agon was recognized in the Greek world as a deity, whose statue appeared at Olympia, presumably in connection with the Olympic Games, which operated as both religious festival in honor of Zeus and athletic competition. Agon is, perhaps, more of a spirit than a god in Greek mythology, but was understood to be related to both Zelos (rivalry) and Nike (victory). More generally, Agon referred to any competitive event that was held in connection with religious festivals, including athletics, music, or dramatic performances.

Agon also appears as a concept in the New Testament where Paul the apostle writes in his epistle to Timothy "Fight the good fight of the faith". It is defined in that context by Strong's Concordance as, agón: a gathering, contest, struggle; as an (athletic) contest; hence, a struggle (in the soul).

== Theater ==
In Ancient Greek drama, particularly Old Comedy (fifth century B.C.), agon refers to a contest or debate between two characters - the protagonist and the antagonist - in the highly structured Classical tragedies and dramas. The agon could also develop between an actor and the choir or between two actors with half of the chorus supporting each. Through the argument of opposing principles, the agon in these performances resembled the dialectic dialogues of Plato. The meaning of the term has escaped the circumscriptions of its classical origins to signify, more generally, the conflict on which a literary work turns.

From this usage come the terms protagonist, the first actor being foremost in the story's struggle, and antagonist, when the struggle is against this character. The deuteragonist and tritagonist act the second most important and third most important roles, and may overlap with the antagonist.

== Dance ==
In 1948, Lincoln Kirstein posed the idea of a ballet that would later become known as Agon. After ten years of work before Agon's premiere, it became the final ballet in a series of collaborations between choreographer George Balanchine and composer Igor Stravinsky. Balanchine referred to this ballet as "the most perfect work" to come out of the collaboration between Stravinsky and himself.

== Literature ==
Harold Bloom in The Western Canon uses the term agon to refer to the attempt by a writer to resolve an intellectual conflict between his ideas and the ideas of an influential predecessor in which "the larger swallows the smaller", such as in chapter 18, Joyce's agon with Shakespeare.

In Man, Play, and Games (1961), Roger Caillois uses the term agon to describe competitive games in which the players have equal chances but the winner succeeds because of "a single quality (speed, endurance, strength, memory, skill, ingenuity, etc.), exercised, within defined limits and without outside assistance."

== Sociopolitical theory ==
In sociopolitical theory, agon can refer to the idea that the clash of opposing forces necessarily results in growth and progress. The concept, known as agonism, has been proposed most explicitly by a number of scholars, including William E. Connolly, Hannah Arendt, Chantal Mouffe, Bonnie Honig, and Claudio Colaguori, but is also implicitly present in the work of scholars such as Theodor Adorno, and Michel Foucault (see also agonistic democracy).

== Derivatives ==
Words derived from agon include agony, agonism, antagonism, and protagonist.

== See also ==
- Man, Play and Games (Roger Caillois)
