= Driesch =

Driesch is a surname. Notable people with the surname include:

- Angela von den Driesch (1934–2012), German archaeologist and veterinarian
- Hans Driesch (1867–1941), German biologist and philosopher
- Johannes Driesch (1901–1930), German painter, graphic artist, ceramicist, and book cover designer
