= List of acquisitions by THQ Nordic =

THQ Nordic is an Austrian video game publisher that acts as the subsidiary of Swedish holding company Embracer Group. Established in 2011 as Nordic Games, the company had acquired the "THQ" trademark in 2014 and changed its name to THQ Nordic in 2016 to better reflect its portfolio. The company, as well as its parent and other entities acting on its behalf, have acquired other companies' games, which are now managed by THQ Nordic.

== List ==
Year	Title	Seller	Ref.
2011	AquaNox	JoWooD Entertainment	
2011	Alien Nations	JoWooD Entertainment	
2011	Beam Breakers	JoWooD Entertainment	
2011	Chaser	JoWooD Entertainment	
2011	Cold Zero	JoWooD Entertainment	
2011	Europa 1400: The Guild	JoWooD Entertainment	
2011	Freak Out: Extreme Freeride	JoWooD Entertainment	
2011	Gothic (partial rights)	JoWooD Entertainment	
2011	Itch!	JoWooD Entertainment	
2011	K-Hawk: Survival Instinct	JoWooD Entertainment	
2011	Legend of Kay	JoWooD Entertainment	
2011	Neighbours from Hell	JoWooD Entertainment	
2011	Panzer Elite	JoWooD Entertainment	
2011	Pusher	JoWooD Entertainment	
2011	Rally Trophy	JoWooD Entertainment	
2011	Railroad Pioneer	JoWooD Entertainment	
2011	Söldner: Secret Wars	JoWooD Entertainment	
2011	Space Force: Rogue Universe	JoWooD Entertainment	
2011	SpellForce	JoWooD Entertainment	
2011	The Nations	JoWooD Entertainment	
2011	Yoga Wii	JoWooD Entertainment	
2011	Zax: The Alien Hunter	JoWooD Entertainment	
2011	Animates	DreamCatcher Interactive	
2011	Besieger	DreamCatcher Interactive	
2011	Castleween	DreamCatcher Interactive	
2011	Domination	DreamCatcher Interactive	
2011	Dunes of War	DreamCatcher Interactive	
2011	Dungeon Lords	DreamCatcher Interactive	
2011	Emergency Fire Response	DreamCatcher Interactive	
2011	Enigma: Rising Tide	DreamCatcher Interactive	
2011	First Battalion	DreamCatcher Interactive	
2011	Genesis Rising: The Universal Crusade	DreamCatcher Interactive	
2011	Harbinger	DreamCatcher Interactive	
2011	Painkiller (sold to Deep Silver)	DreamCatcher Interactive	
2011	Pax Romana	DreamCatcher Interactive	
2011	Project Earth: Starmageddon	DreamCatcher Interactive	
2011	Riddle of the Sphinx: An Egyptian Adventure	DreamCatcher Interactive	
2011	Rock Manager	DreamCatcher Interactive	
2011	Safecracker	DreamCatcher Interactive	
2011	Stealth Combat	DreamCatcher Interactive	
2011	SuperPower	DreamCatcher Interactive	
2011	The Forgotten: It Begins	DreamCatcher Interactive	
2011	The Golden Horde	DreamCatcher Interactive	
2011	Traitors Gate	DreamCatcher Interactive	
2011	Aura: Fate of the Ages	The Adventure Company	
2011	Crystal Key	The Adventure Company	
2011	Dark Fall	The Adventure Company	
2011	Dead Reefs	The Adventure Company	
2011	Dracula: Origin	The Adventure Company	
2011	Echo: Secrets of the Lost Cavern	The Adventure Company	
2011	Evidence: The Last Ritual	The Adventure Company	
2011	Forever Worlds: Enter the Unknown	The Adventure Company	
2011	Hans Christian Andersen: The Ugly Prince Duckling	The Adventure Company	
2011	Keepsake	The Adventure Company	
2011	Missing: Since January	The Adventure Company	
2011	MISSING: The 13th Victim	The Adventure Company	
2011	Murder in the Abbey	The Adventure Company	
2011	Mysterious Journey II	The Adventure Company	
2011	Next Life	The Adventure Company	
2011	NiBiRu: Age of Secrets	The Adventure Company	
2011	Outcry	The Adventure Company	
2011	Post Mortem	The Adventure Company	
2011	Return to Mysterious Island	The Adventure Company	
2011	Safecracker: The Ultimate Puzzle Adventure	The Adventure Company	
2011	Sentinel: Descendants in Time	The Adventure Company	
2011	The Black Mirror	The Adventure Company	
2011	The Book of Unwritten Tales	The Adventure Company	
2011	The Cameron Files	The Adventure Company	
2011	The Raven	The Adventure Company	
2011	Egypt III: The Egyptian Prophecy	The Adventure Company	
2011	The Experiment	The Adventure Company	
2011	The Moment of Silence (partial rights)	The Adventure Company	
2011	The Mystery of the Mummy	The Adventure Company	
2011	The Omega Stone: Riddle of the Sphinx II	The Adventure Company	
2011	Aura II: The Sacred Rings	The Adventure Company	
2011	Traitors Gate 2: Cypher	The Adventure Company	
2011	Voyage: Inspired by Jules Verne	The Adventure Company	
2013	All Star Cheer Squad	THQ	
2013	All Star Karate	THQ	
2013	Alter Echo	THQ	
2013	Baja: Edge of Control	THQ	
2013	Battle of the Bands	THQ	
2013	Beat City	THQ	
2013	Big Beach Sports	THQ	
2013	Big Family Games	THQ	
2013	Crawler	THQ	
2013	Darksiders	THQ	
2013	de Blob	THQ	
2013	Deadly Creatures	THQ	
2013	Deep Six	THQ	
2013	Destroy All Humans!	THQ	
2013	Dood's Big Adventure	THQ	
2013	Elements of Destruction	THQ	
2013	Fantastic Pets	THQ	
2013	Frontlines: Fuel of War	THQ	
2013	Full Spectrum Warrior	THQ	
2013	Juiced	THQ	
2013	Lock's Quest	THQ	
2013	MX vs. ATV	THQ	
2013	Neighborhood Games	THQ	
2013	Pax Imperia: Eminent Domain	THQ	
2013	Red Faction (sold to Deep Silver)	THQ	
2013	Splashdown	THQ	
2013	Stuntman	THQ	
2013	Summoner	THQ	
2013	Terranium	THQ	
2013	The Outfit	THQ	
2013	Titan Quest	THQ	
2013	uDraw	THQ	
2013	World of Zoo	THQ	
2013	Desperados: Wanted Dead or Alive	Atari	
2013	Desperados 2: Cooper's Revenge	Atari	
2013	Silver	Atari	
2014	Codename: Panzers – Cold War	Make Projects	
2014	15 Days	DTP Entertainment	
2014	Curse of the Ghost Ship	DTP Entertainment	
2014	Overclocked: A History of Violence	DTP Entertainment	
2014	The Moment of Silence (full rights)	DTP Entertainment	
2014	The Mystery of the Druids	DTP Entertainment	
2015	Men of Valor	2015	
2015	Bridge Project	bitComposer Entertainment	
2015	Citadels	bitComposer Entertainment	
2015	Jagged Alliance	bitComposer Entertainment	
2015	North & South	bitComposer Entertainment	
2015	Panzer Tactics DS	bitComposer Entertainment	
2015	Panzer Tactics HD	bitComposer Entertainment	
2015	Thunder Wolves	bitComposer Entertainment	
2015	Nexus: The Jupiter Incident	HD Publishing	
2015	Codename: Panzers	NeocoreGames	
2015	Impossible Creatures	Relic Entertainment	
2016	Bang Bang Racing	Digital Reality	
2016	Black Knight Sword	Digital Reality	
2016	Imperium Galactica	Digital Reality	
2016	Liberty Wings	Digital Reality	
2016	Sine Mora	Digital Reality	
2016	Scarabeus: Pearls of Nile	Digital Reality	
2016	SkyDrift	Digital Reality	
2016	Ubrain	Digital Reality	
2016	Armored Fist	NovaLogic	
2016	Black Fire	NovaLogic	
2016	Delta Force	NovaLogic	
2016	Comanche	NovaLogic	
2016	F-16 Multirole Fighter	NovaLogic	
2016	F-22	NovaLogic	
2016	Jigsaw: The Ultimate Electronic Puzzle	NovaLogic	
2016	Joint Operations: Typhoon Rising	NovaLogic	
2016	MiG-29 Fulcrum	NovaLogic	
2016	Tachyon: The Fringe	NovaLogic	
2016	Ultrabots	NovaLogic	
2016	Wolfpack	NovaLogic	
2016	Sphinx and the Cursed Mummy	Mobile Gaming Studios	
2016	Legends of War	Enigma Software Productions	
2016	War Leaders: Clash of Nations	Enigma Software Productions	
2017	Rad Rodgers	Slipgate Studios	
2017	Giana Sisters	Black Forest Games	
2017	Helldorado	Black Forest Games	
2017	Rogue Stormers	Black Forest Games	
2017	Fret Nice	Pieces Interactive	
2017	Kill to Collect	Pieces Interactive	
2017	Puzzlegeddon	Pieces Interactive	
2017	Robo Surf	Pieces Interactive	
2017	Roby Tumbler	Pieces Interactive	
2017	Biomutant	Experiment 101	
2018	1940s	HandyGames	
2018	Aces of the Luftwaffe	HandyGames	
2018	Aporkalypse	HandyGames	
2018	Bouncing Bandit	HandyGames	
2018	Clouds & Sheep	HandyGames	
2018	Devils & Demons	HandyGames	
2018	Dynamite Fishing	HandyGames	
2018	Farm Invasion USA	HandyGames	
2018	Epic Battle Dude	HandyGames	
2018	Guns'n'Glory	HandyGames	
2018	Happy Vikings	HandyGames	
2018	Hidden Temple	HandyGames	
2018	I Slay Zombies	HandyGames	
2018	infeCCt	HandyGames	
2018	My Fitness	HandyGames	
2018	Ninja Hero Cats	HandyGames	
2018	Panzer Panic	HandyGames	
2018	Photo Party Puzzle	HandyGames	
2018	Pick by Watch	HandyGames	
2018	Rocket Island	HandyGames	
2018	Save the Puppies	HandyGames	
2018	Stage Dive Legends	HandyGames	
2018	Stunt Kite Masters	HandyGames	
2018	Super Party Sports	HandyGames	
2018	Townsmen	HandyGames	
2018	Vegas Fruit Slots	HandyGames	
2018	Watch Face	HandyGames	
2018	Second Sight (full rights)	Crytek	
2018	TimeSplitters (sold to Deep Silver)	Crytek	
2018	Kingdoms of Amalur: Reckoning	38 Studios	
2018	Act of War	Atari	
2018	Alone in the Dark	Atari	
2018	Wreckfest	Bugbear Entertainment	
2018	Expeditions: Conquistador	Logic Artists	
2018	Expeditions: Viking	Logic Artists	
2018	Carmageddon	Stainless Games	
2019	Outcast	Appeal	
2019	ELEX	Piranha Bytes	
2019	Gothic (full rights)	Piranha Bytes	
2019	Risen (full rights)	Piranha Bytes	
2019	Chronos	Gunfire Games	
2019	Dead and Buried	Gunfire Games	
2019	From Other Suns	Gunfire Games	
2019	Remnant: From the Ashes	Gunfire Games	
2020	Rush for Berlin	Deep Silver/Koch Media	
2020	Sacred	Deep Silver/Koch Media	
2020	Singles: Flirt Up Your Life	Deep Silver/Koch Media	
