= PlayStation Mouse =

Input device for the PlayStation

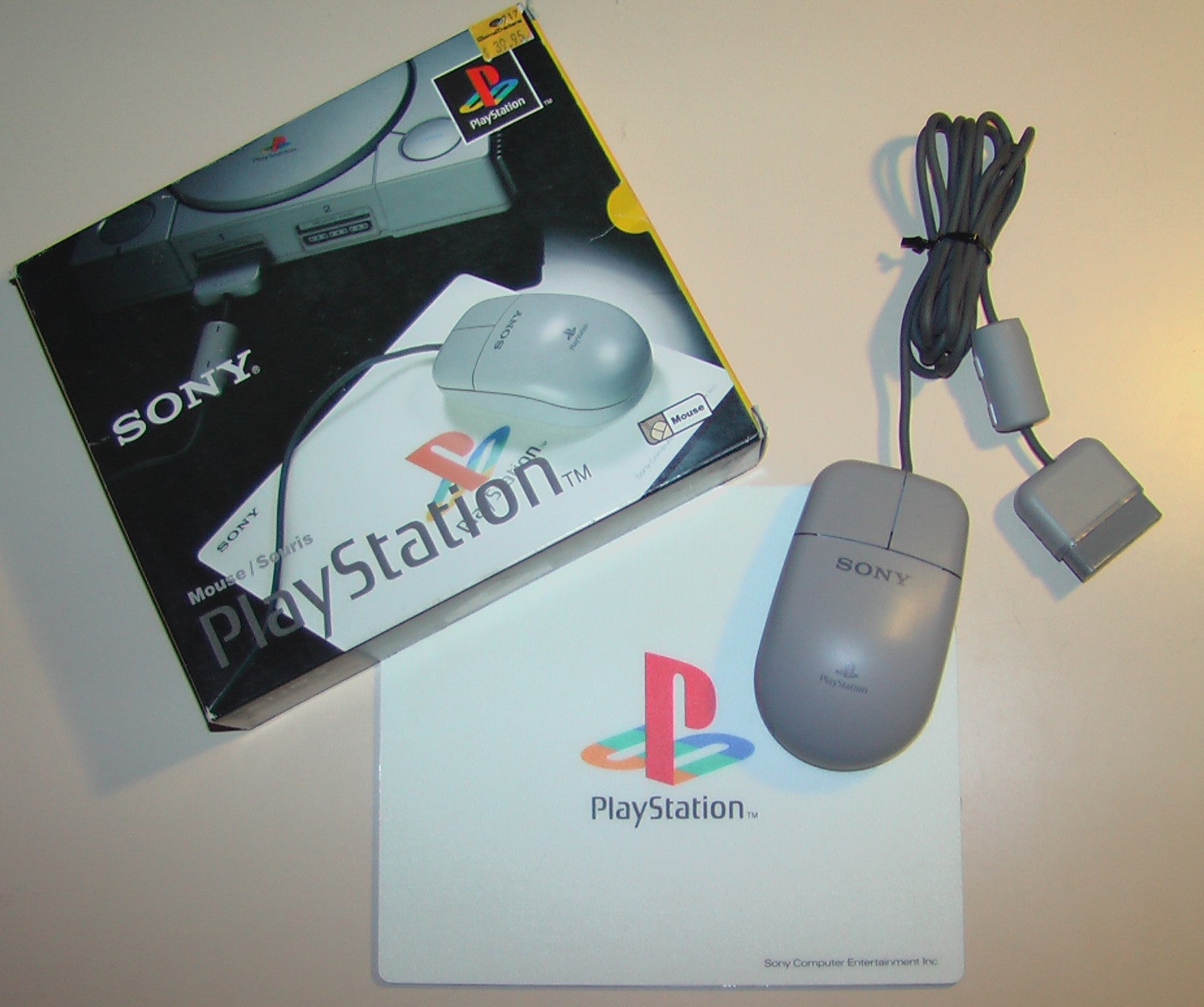
- The PlayStation Mouse, mouse mat and packaging
- Manufacturer: Sony Computer Entertainment
- Type: Video game controller Mouse
- Generation: Fifth generation era
- Connectivity: Controller ports
- Model Number: SCPH-1030 (Japan), SCPH-1090 (elsewhere)

The PlayStation Mouse is an input device for the PlayStation. The mouse was released in Japan on December 3, 1994, the launch date of the PlayStation.

The mouse is a simple two-button ball mouse that plugs directly into the PlayStation controller port without adapters or conversions and is a fully supported Sony accessory. It was packaged along with a mouse mat bearing the PlayStation logo.

The mouse is mainly used in point-and-click adventures, strategy games, simulation games and visual novels. In later years, first-person shooters which make use of the peripheral to aim the player's view in the same manner as similar games on the PC were released. It is also used by the arcade light gun shooting game Area 51 as an aiming device instead of a light gun compatibility.

A special Konami-branded edition of the mouse was released alongside the Japanese exclusive title Tokimeki Memorial: Forever With You. Mouse packs for Disney's Winnie the Pooh Kindergarten and Disney's Winnie the Pooh Preschool were also released exclusively in Japan.

== List of games compatible with the PlayStation Mouse ==
- A Nanjarin
- A-Train
- Actua Pool
- Alien Resurrection
- Amerzone: The Explorer's Legacy
- Arcade's Greatest Hits: The Atari Collection 1
- Arcade's Greatest Hits: The Atari Collection 2
- Arcade Party Pak
- Are! Mo Kore? Mo Momotarou
- Area 51
- Arkanoid Returns
- Ark of Time
- Arthur to Astaroth no Nazomakaimura: Incredible Toons
- Atari Anniversary Edition
- Atlantis: The Lost Tales
- Aztec: The Curse in the Heart of the City of Gold
- Backgammon (Note: This functionality was only present in the Japanese release, titled Backgammon. It was released in PAL territories as Pro Backgammon without Playstation Mouse compatibility.)
- Baldies
- Bedlam
- Blockids
- Breakout
- BreakThru!
- Broken Sword: The Shadow of the Templars
- Broken Sword II: The Smoking Mirror
- Cat the Ripper: Jyusanninme no Tanteishi
- Chaos Control
- Chibi Maruko-Chan: Maruko Enikki World
- China: The Forbidden City
- Chronicles of the Sword
- City Bravo!
- Clock Tower: The First Fear
- Clock Tower
- Clock Tower II: The Struggle Within
- Command & Conquer: Red Alert
- Command & Conquer: Red Alert - Retaliation
- Constructor
- Cyberia
- Daisenryaku - Master Combat
- Daisenryaku - Player's Spirit
- Dark Seed
- Dengeki Construction: Ochige-Yarouze!
- Dezamon Plus
- Die Hard Trilogy
- Die Hard Trilogy 2: Viva Las Vegas
- Discworld
- Discworld II: Missing Presumed...!?
- Discworld Noir
- Disney's Winnie the Pooh Kindergarten
- Disney's Winnie the Pooh Preschool
- Doki Doki Shutter Chance
- Dōkyūsei 2
- Dracula: The Resurrection
- Dracula 2: The Last Sanctuary
- Dune 2000
- Eigo no Tetsujin: Center Shiken Trial
- Eisei Meijin
- Eisei Meijin II
- Eisei Meijin III
- Egypt 1156 B.C.: Tomb of the Pharaoh
- Egypt II: The Heliopolis Prophecy
- Elemental Gearbolt
- Final Doom
- Front Mission Alternative
- Galaxian 3
- Game no Tatsujin
- Game no Tatsujin 2
- Game no Tatsujin: The Shanghai
- Gekka Ni no Kishi: O Ryusen
- Ghoul Panic
- Global Domination
- Go II Professional Taikyogu Igo
- Gotha II: Tenkuu no Kishi
- Hatsukoi Valentine
- Hatsukoi Valentine Special
- Help Charity Compilation (Note: The compilation includes three titles, two of which are compatible (Broken Sword: The Shadow of the Templars and Myst) and a third (Road Rash) which is not.)
- Henry Explorers (Note: This functionality was only present in the Japanese release. The game was released as Crypt Killer in other territories.)
- Houma Hunter Lime with Paint Maker
- Irritating Stick
- Jellyfish: The Healing Friend
- Jigsaw Madness
- Jigsaw World
- Jingle Cats: Love Para Daisakusen no Maki
- Katou Hifumi Kudan: Shogi Club
- Keiba Eight '98
- Keiba Eight '98 Akifuyu
- Keiba Eight '99 Haru Natsu
- Keiba Saisho no Housoku '96 Vol. 1
- Keiba Saisho no Housoku '96 Vol. 2 - G1-Road
- Keiba Saisho no Housoku '97 Vol. 1 - Nerae! Banbaken!
- Keiba Saisho no Housoku '97 Vol. 2 - To Hit
- Keiba Saisho no Housoku '99 Aki Fuyu
- Kekkon: Marriage
- Klaymen Klaymen: The Mystery of the Neverhood
- Koten Tsugoshuu: Shijin no Kan
- Kouryuu Sangoku Engi
- Las Vegas Dream 2
- Lemmings & Oh No! More Lemmings
- Lemmings 3D
- Louvre: The Final Curse
- Luciferd
- Lulu
- Lupin III: Chateau de Cagliostro Saikai
- Meguri Aishite
- Meta-Ph-List: Gamma X 2097
- Mighty Hits Special
- Missland 2
- Mobile Suit Gundam - Perfect One Year War
- Monopoly
- Moorhen 3: Chicken Case
- Moorhuhn 2: Die Jagd Geht Weiter
- Moorhuhn X
- MTV Music Generator
- Myst
- My Disney Kitchen
- Necronomicon: The Dawning of Darkness
- Neo Planet
- Neorude
- Neorude 2
- Neorude: Kizamareta Monshou
- Ojyousama Express
- Oracle no Houseki: Jewels of the Oracle
- Osaka Naniwa Matenrow
- Perfect Assassin
- Player Manager
- Player Manager Ninety Nine
- Policenauts
- Premier Manager 98
- Premier Manager: Ninety Nine
- Premier Manager 2000
- Prisoner of Ice
- Prism Land Story (Note: This functionality was only present in the Japanese release, titled Prism Land Story. It was released in PAL territories as Prism Land and in North America as Sorcerer's Maze without Playstation Mouse compatibility.)
- Project: Horned Owl
- Puchi Carat
- Quake II
- Quantum Gate I: Akumu no Joshou
- Railroad Tycoon II
- Rescue Shot
- Risk
- Riven: The Sequel to Myst
- RPG Maker
- Sakamoto Ryuma: Ishin Kaikoku
- Sentinel Returns
- Serofans
- Shanghai: Banri no Choujou
- Shanghai: Great Moments
- Shanghai: True Valor
- Shichisei Toushin Guyferd: Crown Kaimetsu Sakusen
- SilverLoad
- SimCity 2000
- Snatcher
- Spin Jam
- Starblade Alpha
- Syndicate Wars
- Takuramakan
- Tempest X3
- Tenga-Seiha
- Tenshi Doumei
- Theme Aquarium
- Time Crisis
- Tokimeki Memorial: Forever With You
- Tokimeki Memorial 2
- Tokimeki Memorial Drama Series: Vol.1 - Nijiiro no Seisyun
- Tokimeki Memorial Drama Series: Vol.2 - Irodori no Love Song
- Tokimeki Memorial Selection: Fujisaki Shiori
- Transport Tycoon
- Ubik
- Versailles: A Game of Intrigue
- Virtual Pool
- Voice Paradice Excella
- Warhammer: Dark Omen
- Warzone 2100
- X-COM: UFO Defense
- X-COM: Terror from the Deep
- Z
