= The Crystal Key =

1999 graphic adventure video game

- Developer: Earthlight Productions
- Publisher: DreamCatcher Interactive
- Platforms: Windows, Mac OS
- Release: 22 November 1999
- Genre: Graphic adventure
- Mode: Single-player

The Crystal Key is a 1999 graphic adventure video game developed by Earthlight Productions and published by DreamCatcher Interactive. A work of science fiction, it casts the player as an interstellar explorer on a quest to save Earth from Ozgar, a malevolent alien conqueror. The player uses portals to traverse multiple planets, including desert and jungle worlds, while collecting items and solving puzzles. The Crystal Key was conceived by John and Jennifer Matheson in the mid-1990s, and it underwent a five-year creation process hampered by problems with its technology. It was signed by DreamCatcher as part of the publisher's strategic push into the adventure game genre.

The Crystal Key became a commercial hit and was DreamCatcher's best-selling game of 2000. It was a central piece in the effort by the publisher's parent, Cryo Interactive, to penetrate the North American market; the title proceeded to sell above 500,000 units in that region alone by 2004. The game received mixed-to-negative reviews from critics, who cited bugs and often unfavorably compared it to Myst. While certain reviewers praised The Crystal Key's visuals and gameplay, others panned them outright, along with the game itself. After a lengthy development period, Earthlight followed up The Crystal Key in 2004 with the sequel Crystal Key 2, a co-production with Kheops Studio in France.

== Gameplay and plot ==
The player stands near a train. The inventory is at the bottom of the screen, with the spacepack opened to reveal its contents.

The Crystal Key is a graphic adventure game that takes place from a character's eye-view in a pre-rendered graphical environment. Using a point-and-click interface, the player navigates the game world, collects items and solves puzzles. Player movement is restricted to jumps between panoramic static screens, in a manner that has been compared to Myst. The camera view can be rotated 360° on each screen. The character's movement through the world is portrayed by animated cutscene transitions between jumps. At the bottom-left of the game screen, a "spacepack" inventory can be toggled to reveal the items carried by the player character. These objects may be used on things in the world to complete puzzles and progress through the game.

As a work of science fiction, The Crystal Key casts the player as the pilot of an experimental spacecraft able to reach the speed of light. Shortly before the game starts, Earth is attacked by an alien military led by the malevolent Ozgar. Around the same time, Earth intercepts an interstellar message from a race called the Arkonians, which reveals that Arkonian forces had previously defeated Ozgar by unknown means. The player is sent to the source of this transmission to learn more, and to explore the worlds left behind by the Arkonians. The Crystal Key begins as the player reaches the transmission's origin point, near series of locked portals to other planets. Locating a device known as the Crystal Key, the player accesses these portals and travels to a desert planet, a jungle-themed world and the Arkonians' underwater city of Suralon. The Arkonians' mission had long been to keep this key away from Ozgar. Ultimately, the player boards Ozgar's spacecraft and vanquishes him, thereby saving Earth.

== Development ==
Earthlight Productions created The Crystal Key's rotatable 360° panoramas (like the one demonstrated above) with the program QuickTime VR.

The Crystal Key was conceived by John and Jennifer Matheson in the mid-1990s. Developed by Earthlight Productions, the game ultimately underwent a five-year creation process. John Matheson later noted that the project suffered from "technical issues with [its] development platform" that slowed production. The Mathesons collaborated on the game's story, while John served as programmer and was among the title's 10 artists. Earthlight employed QuickTime VR to create The Crystal Key's 360° panoramic environments, which were devised to allow some vertical scrolling without being truly spherical. In an effort to minimize the game's interface, the team designed The Crystal Key in such a way as to never require double-clicks.

By April 1999, Earthlight had signed with publisher DreamCatcher Interactive to distribute The Crystal Key and was set to release the game that year. DreamCatcher had started doing business in 1996 with the publication of Jewels of the Oracle, and gradually drifted into the adventure genre after finding that "customers really were hungry for" these titles, according to DreamCatcher's Director of Sales Marshall Zwicker. Profit reported that the publisher located such projects via networking at tradeshows and reviewing unsolicited game proposals. The Crystal Key was among several games that DreamCatcher used to push its corporate strategy in the adventure genre at the time, alongside Nightlong: Union City Conspiracy and The Forgotten: It Begins. The publisher compared the game to Beyond Time, one of the adventure game releases whose reception had drawn it to the field. DreamCatcher released The Crystal Key on November 22, 1999, at a budget price point and on two CD-ROMs.

== Reception ==
=== Sales ===
The Crystal Key was a commercial success. During the first quarter of 2000, DreamCatcher Interactive shipped more than 120,000 units of the game to major retailers in the United States, including Target and Walmart. The title was a central piece in the effort by DreamCatcher's parent Cryo Interactive, which bought the publisher in March 2000, to expand its international reach. In the United States, The Crystal Key debuted on PC Data's computer game sales rankings at #14 for June 2000, with an average retail price of $18. It secured 17th place in both July and August, but was absent from the top 20 in September. According to PC Data, its sales in August alone were 19,079 units, for revenues of $358,984. The Crystal Key's North American retail sales for 2000 ultimately totaled 178,690 units, by PC Data's tally. December accounted for 35,643 of these sales. The game was DreamCatcher's biggest seller of 2000 and represented 32% of company sales that year.

The Crystal Key continued to sell in North America during 2001, when PC Data reported 29,539 sales by March, 49,478 by June and 67,099 by year's end. Another 21,702 units were sold in the region during the first six months of 2002. By June of that year, the game's total sales had surpassed 400,000 units. This led Susanne Baillie of Profit to declare The Crystal Key "one of the best-selling PC games of all time", and she cited it as part of DreamCatcher's dominance of the adventure game market by that point. According to DreamCatcher, sales of The Crystal Key in North America reached 455,000 units by early 2003, and ultimately surpassed 500,000 copies by March 2004.

=== Critical reviews ===
Reception

Review scores
Publication	Score
Adventure Gamers	4/5
Computer Games Strategy Plus	1.5/5
IGN	6.8/10
The Electric Playground	5.5/10
Just Adventure	A− / B+ / B+
Inside Mac Games	5/10

In 2004, Scott Osborne of GameSpot wrote that The Crystal Key "received a ho-hum reception at best and was quickly forgotten". PC PowerPlay's Agata Budinska, Inside Mac Games' Richard Hallas and The Electric Playground's Niko Silvester characterized it as a low-quality clone of Myst; the third writer called it Myst's "grubby little brother". Reviewing The Crystal Key for Computer Games Strategy Plus, David Ryan Hunt described it as a game devoid of redeeming qualities that ultimately "doesn't have anything to offer". He sharply criticized its low-resolution visuals and found its story shallow and its gameplay uninspired. Budinska and Silvester echoed Hunt's critique of the gameplay, and Silvester similarly noted its "muddy" visuals and abrupt ending. One argument in its favor, in Silvester's view, was its low price point.

Erik Peterson of IGN had a more positive assessment of The Crystal Key. In contrast to Silvester and Hunt, he highly praised the visuals and panoramic views, and found the puzzles "both challenging and intriguing". By his estimation, it was "a surprisingly fun game" and one of the last "true" adventure games. Nevertheless, he shared Hunt's problems with major bugs in the software, and encountered a game-breaking glitch on the jungle planet. Saved game glitches and numerous crashes were likewise reported by Darcy Danielson, the reviewer for Just Adventure, who followed Silvester in criticizing The Crystal Key's disk swapping. Danielson also concurred with Peterson on the game's limited sound design, which IGN's writer considered to be a core problem that held the title back from greatness. Despite these issues, Danielson felt that The Crystal Key was "quite a find" and shared Peterson's positive view of its graphics and puzzles, and his belief that it suited both novices and experienced players.

Hallas and Adventure Gamers' reviewer, Ray Ivey, both felt that The Crystal Key failed to break new ground in its genre. This led them to different conclusions: while Hallas wrote that "other games have already done very similar things much better", Ivey dismissed the idea that the game's lack of innovation posed a problem, given its high quality. The latter writer praised the music, concurred with Peterson and Danielson on the puzzles and summarized The Crystal Key as "a very fun, satisfying game" for Myst clone fans. However, he found the visuals "uneven", noting the beauty of certain environments but agreeing with Silvester on the "muddy" look of others. For Hallas, the graphics were mediocre and the puzzles a mixed bag, and like Silvester and Hunt he was let down by the ending. In line with those two writers, Hallas concluded that The Crystal Key is a "rather disappointing" experience.

== Sequel ==
A sequel to The Crystal Key, at first entitled Crystal Key II: The Far Realm, was revealed by DreamCatcher Interactive's Adventure Company imprint in April 2003. It was among a slew of announcements in preparation for the 2003 Electronic Entertainment Expo (E3), and Marek Bronstring of Adventure Gamers called it one of the publisher's "top titles premiering at the show", alongside Traitors Gate II: Cypher. Earthlight Productions developed Crystal Key 2 with Virtools and V-Ray. It was designed to feature spherical 360° panoramas, unlike its predecessor's more limited viewing areas. According to John Matheson, Earthlight sought to overcome the problems that had affected The Crystal Key's production pipeline and give its art team more room "to be as creative as possible". The game's plot builds upon that of the original, and casts the player as Call, who seeks to stop the minions of Ozgar and save the world of Evany.

Initially developed by Earthlight and set for a winter 2003 release, Crystal Key 2 underwent "many years" of production and took longer than The Adventure Company had wanted, as Benoît Hozjan of Kheops Studio later remarked. As a result, Kheops was hired to co-develop the game late in production, which Hozjan said included the programming and the integration, with John Matheson. In July 2003, Matheson estimated Crystal Key 2 as 75% complete and on track for December, but it ultimately launched in March 2004. In the European market it was released as Evany: Key to a Distant Land. The review aggregation website Metacritic summarized the game's critical reception as "mixed or average".

== See also ==
- Beyond Atlantis
- Dracula: Resurrection
- Riddle of the Sphinx: An Egyptian Adventure
- Traitors Gate
