= Pompei: The Legend of Vesuvius =

2000 video game

- European cover art
- Developer: Arxel Tribe
- Publishers: EU: Cryo Interactive; NA: DreamCatcher Interactive
- Engine: CINview
- Platforms: Windows, Macintosh
- Release: EU: 1 March 2000; NA: 27 September 2000
- Genre: Adventure
- Mode: Single-player

Pompei: The Legend of Vesuvius, also known as TimeScape: Journey to Pompeii in North America and Pompéi: La Colère du volcan in France, is a 2000 historical adventure game. The game was developed by Arxel Tribe and Réunion des Musées Nationaux, and published by Cryo Interactive. It is followed by a sequel, Jerusalem: The Three Roads to the Holy Land.

== Plot ==
When an explorer and world famous cartographer by the name of Adrien Blake returns from an expedition, he discovers that his fiancée, Sophia, has disappeared. Wracked with grief, Adrian immerses himself in his manuscripts and reveals an ancient curse placed on him by the goddess Ishtar. Blake must go to 79 AD Pompeii, where a volcano will erupt in four days' time, destroying the city, and find Sophia.

== Development ==
Pompei uses the CINview engine, also used in Arxel Tribe's 1999 title Faust.

== Reception ==
Reception

Review score
Publication	Score
GameSpy	84/100

According to Cryo Interactive's marketing manager, Mattieu Saint-Dennis, Pompei sold 90,000 units in Europe alone by December 2000. Of this number, France accounted for 30,000 copies.

Tom Houston of Just Adventure praised its story, graphics, and puzzles while deeming it on par with Egypt 1156 B.C., China, and Aztec. Meanwhile, the site's Ray Ivey gave the game a D, commenting that the experience left him "grumpy for days". Gamespy's Tamara Schembri positively compared it to Beyond Atlantis due to the former seamlessly blending its education and entertainment. Michael Lafferty of GameZone thought the title had a wide appeal as a family adventure game with a rich story.
