= DreamCatcher Interactive =

Canadian video game publisher

DreamCatcher Interactive Inc.
- Type: Subsidiary
- Industry: Video games
- Founded: 1996
- Founder: Richard Wah Kan
- Defunct: 2011
- Fate: Dissolved with parent, assets acquired by Nordic Games
- Successor: THQ Nordic
- Headquarters: Toronto, Ontario, Canada
- Products: See products listing
- Parent: JoWooD Entertainment (2006–2011)
- Divisions: The Adventure Company

DreamCatcher Interactive Inc. (also known as DreamCatcher Games) was a Canadian video game publisher founded in 1996 by Richard Wah Kan. It was best known for its adventure games. In 2006, the company became a subsidiary of JoWooD Entertainment. In 2011, the company went into administration along with its parent JoWooD and all assets were purchased by Nordic Games Holding. The DreamCatcher Interactive brand is currently being used as a publishing label for THQ Nordic.

== History ==
DreamCatcher Interactive was founded in 1996 at Toronto, Canada. Its first published title was Jewels of the Oracle. The company gradually drifted into becoming a publisher focused on the adventure genre after finding that "customers really were hungry for" these titles, according to DreamCatcher's Marshall Zwicker. Beyond Time was among the releases whose reception drew the publisher to this field. Profit reported that DreamCatcher located such projects via "networking at tradeshows and reviewing unsolicited game proposals." In 1999, DreamCatcher pushed its corporate strategy by launching Nightlong: Union City Conspiracy, The Forgotten: It Begins and The Crystal Key. The latter went on to a major hit. DreamCatcher's top four titles for 2000 were Dracula: Resurrection, Traitors Gate, Beyond Atlantis and The Crystal Key. These games respectively made up 9%, 14%, 15% and 32% of DreamCatcher's sales that year. In March 2000, DreamCatcher was purchased by Cryo Interactive. Continuing the company's growth, in November 2000, DreamCatcher signed with Her Interactive to publish the Nancy Drew franchise.

In late 2002, most of the assets and development teams of French-based publisher, Cryo Interactive were absorbed by DreamCatcher Interactive, forming the base for DreamCatcher Europe including key offices and a large internal studio. By early 2003, DreamCatcher was the United States' tenth-biggest publisher of games. After the acquisition of Cryo Interactive, Dreamcatcher created a publishing division called The Adventure Company in early 2003. The company also partnered with both Wanadoo Edition and Microïds, as well as other studios in the development and distribution of games including Syberia, Still Life and ObsCure. In 2005, the main Microïds studio was acquired by Ubisoft with Dreamcatcher retaining publishing rights to the games being created.

The Adventure Company brand label under DreamCatcher has released many adventure game series' including series' based on Agatha Christie novels. They also recently signed to release a series of titles based on The Hardy Boys. Outside of adventure gaming, DreamCatcher is best known for publishing the first-person shooter Painkiller developed with People Can Fly. Painkiller became a commercial success and was signed with the CPL World Tour 2005. Dreamcatcher would also create another label, Silverline Software, around 2004 for the distribution of some non-core games and the publishing of utility software. Silverline Software would release the "Time to Ride" series of girl's horse games starting in 2004, which would later be acquired by Ubisoft.

In 2006, JoWooD Entertainment announced the purchase of DreamCatcher Games as a way of increasing its presence into the North American gaming market in addition to acquiring the company's key titles and licenses. Since the acquisition, DreamCatcher Games has continued to launch titles both under The Adventure Company and DreamCatcher labels including new games created by JoWooD like the SpellForce series. In 2011, JoWooD went into administration causing DreamCatcher to file for bankruptcy. In November 2011, Nordic Games Holding announced that it had acquired all DreamCatcher assets and would be turning it into a publishing label of its subsidiary Nordic Games. Nordic Games Holding had previously acquired JoWooD and The Adventure Company in August also turning both brands into publishing labels of Nordic Games. All business operations of this brand are being conducted out of THQ Nordic in Vienna, Austria.

== Games ==
Note: This list is for titles which DreamCatcher Interactive published. Releases of games under The Adventure Company banner are not included.

Year	Title	Developer	Platform(s)
1996	Jewels of the Oracle	ELOI Productions	Macintosh, Windows 3.x
1997	Egypt 1156 B.C.: Tomb of the Pharaoh	Cryo Interactive Entertainment	Macintosh, Microsoft Windows
1997	Safecracker	Daydream Software	Macintosh, Microsoft Windows
1997	Soldier Boyz	Daydream Software	Microsoft Windows
1997	Beyond Time	Jones and Jones Multimedia	Microsoft Windows, Windows 3.x
1998	Jewels II: The Ultimate Challenge	ELOI Productions	Microsoft Windows, Windows 3.x
1998	Karma: Curse of the 12 Caves		Microsoft Windows
1998	Cydonia: Mars - The First Manned Mission		Microsoft Windows
1998	Nightlong: Union City Conspiracy		Microsoft Windows
1999	The Adventures of Jonny Quest		Microsoft Windows
1999	The Crystal Key		Macintosh, Microsoft Windows
2000	The Forgotten: It Begins		Macintosh, Microsoft Windows
2000	Egypt II: The Heliopolis Prophecy		Microsoft Windows
2000	Seven Games of the Soul		Microsoft Windows
2000	Riddle of the Sphinx: An Egyptian Adventure		Macintosh, Microsoft Windows
2000	The Legend of Lotus Spring		Macintosh, Microsoft Windows
2000	The Sacred Amulet		Microsoft Windows
2000	Dracula: The Resurrection		Macintosh, PlayStation, Microsoft Windows
2000	Traitors Gate		Macintosh, Microsoft Windows
2000	Beyond Atlantis		Macintosh, Microsoft Windows
2000	In Cold Blood		PlayStation, Microsoft Windows
2000	The New Adventures of the Time Machine		Microsoft Windows
2000	TimeScape: Journey to Pompeii		Macintosh, Microsoft Windows
2000	The Legend of the Prophet and the Assassin		Microsoft Windows
2000	Odyssey: The Search for Ulysses		Microsoft Windows
2000	Nancy Drew: Message in a Haunted Mansion		Microsoft Windows, Game Boy Advance
2001	Frank Herbert's Dune		Microsoft Windows
2001	Dracula: The Last Sanctuary		Macintosh, PlayStation, Microsoft Windows
2001	Necronomicon: The Dawning of Darkness		PlayStation, Microsoft Windows
2001	The Messenger		Macintosh, Microsoft Windows
2001	Dracula: Crazy Vampire		Game Boy Color
2001	Nancy Drew: Secrets Can Kill		Microsoft Windows
2001	The Secrets of Alamut		Microsoft Windows
2001	Nancy Drew: Stay Tuned for Danger		Microsoft Windows
2001	Arthur's Knights: Tales of Chivalry		Microsoft Windows
2001	Nancy Drew: Treasure in the Royal Tower		Microsoft Windows
2001	Woody Woodpecker		Game Boy Color
2001	Amerzone: The Explorer's Legacy		Microsoft Windows
2001	Atlantis: The Lost Tales		Microsoft Windows
2001	Jekyll & Hyde		Microsoft Windows
2001	The Shadow of Zorro		Microsoft Windows
2001	From Dusk Till Dawn		Microsoft Windows
2001	Schizm: Mysterious Journey		Microsoft Windows
2001	Beyond Atlantis II		Microsoft Windows
2001	Nancy Drew: The Final Scene		Microsoft Windows
2001	MegaRace 3		Microsoft Windows
2002	Inspector Gadget: Advance Mission		Game Boy Advance
2002	Gremlins: Stripe vs. Gizmo		Game Boy Advance
2002	Woody Woodpecker: Escape from Buzz Buzzard Park		PlayStation 2
2002	Casino Mogul		Microsoft Windows
2002	SuperPower		Microsoft Windows
2002	Factory Mogul		Microsoft Windows
2002	Arabian Nights		Microsoft Windows
2002	Project Earth: Starmageddon		Microsoft Windows
2002	The Mystery of the Nautilus		Microsoft Windows
2002	Gore: Ultimate Soldier		Microsoft Windows
2002	Rock Manager		Microsoft Windows
2002	Agassi Tennis Generation		PlayStation 2
2002	Iron Storm		Microsoft Windows
2002	Extreme Ghostbusters: Code Ecto-1		Game Boy Advance
2002	Kaan: Barbarian's Blade		PlayStation 2, Microsoft Windows
2002	Law & Order: Dead on the Money		Microsoft Windows
2002	Pink Panther: Pinkadelic Pursuit		PlayStation
2002	Hegemonia: Legions of Iron		Microsoft Windows
2002	Pink Panther: Pinkadelic Pursuit		Game Boy Advance
2002	Post Mortem		Microsoft Windows
2003	Battlecruiser Millennium Gold		Microsoft Windows
2003	Harbinger		Microsoft Windows
2003	Hellboy: Dogs of the Night		PlayStation
2003	Emergency Fire Response		Microsoft Windows
2003	Enigma: Rising Tide		Microsoft Windows
2003	Spirits & Spells		GameCube
2003	Curse: The Eye of Isis		Microsoft Windows, Xbox
2003	Etherlords II		Microsoft Windows
2003	Ultimate Beach Soccer		Game Boy Advance, Microsoft Windows, PlayStation 2, Xbox
2003	Pax Romana		Microsoft Windows
2003	Broken Sword: The Sleeping Dragon		Microsoft Windows
2003	Arx Fatalis		Xbox
2004	Saddle Up: Time to Ride		Microsoft Windows
2004	Besieger		Microsoft Windows
2004	Traitors Gate 2: Cypher		Microsoft Windows
2004	Universal Combat		Microsoft Windows
2004	Crystal Key II: The Far Realm		Microsoft Windows
2004	Painkiller		Microsoft Windows
2004	The Omega Stone: Riddle of the Sphinx II		Microsoft Windows
2004	Aura: Fate of the Ages		Microsoft Windows
2004	SuperPower 2		Microsoft Windows
2004	Lights Out		Microsoft Windows
2004	Return to Mysterious Island		Microsoft Windows
2004	Painkiller: Battle Out of Hell		Microsoft Windows
2004	Advanced Battlegrounds: The Future of Combat		Microsoft Windows
2005	Cops 2170: The Power of Law		Microsoft Windows
2005	Yager		Microsoft Windows
2005	Enigma: Rising Tide		Microsoft Windows
2005	The Moment of Silence		Microsoft Windows
2005	Domination		Microsoft Windows
2005	ObsCure		PlayStation 2, Microsoft Windows, Xbox
2005	Painkiller: Gold Edition		Microsoft Windows
2005	MetalHeart: Replicants Rampage		Microsoft Windows
2005	Dungeon Lords		Microsoft Windows
2005	Still Life		Xbox
2005	Echo: Secrets of the Lost Cavern		Microsoft Windows
2005	Painkiller: Black		Microsoft Windows
2005	NiBiRu: Age of Secrets		Microsoft Windows
2005	Cold War		Microsoft Windows, Xbox
2005	Agatha Christie: And Then There Were None		Wii, Microsoft Windows
2006	Agatha Christie: Murder on the Orient Express		Microsoft Windows
2006	Dungeon Lords: Collector's Edition		Microsoft Windows
2006	Keepsake		Microsoft Windows
2006	Glory of the Roman Empire		Microsoft Windows
2006	Wildlife Zoo		Microsoft Windows
2006	Painkiller: Hell Wars		Xbox
2006	Ship Simulator 2006		Microsoft Windows
2006	First Battalion		Microsoft Windows
2006	Neverend		Microsoft Windows
2006	Evidence: The Last Ritual		Microsoft Windows
2006	Secret Files: Tunguska		Microsoft Windows
2007	Nanny Mania		Microsoft Windows
2007	Secrets of the Ark: A Broken Sword Game		Microsoft Windows
2007	Power Boat GT		Microsoft Windows
2007	The Sacred Rings		Microsoft Windows
2007	The Ugly Prince Duckling		Microsoft Windows
2007	Genesis Rising		Microsoft Windows
2007	Dawnspire: Prelude		Microsoft Windows
2007	Voyage		Microsoft Windows
2007	Sentinel: Descendants in Time		Microsoft Windows
2007	Mysterious Journey II: Chameleon		Microsoft Windows
2007	Dunes of War		Microsoft Windows
2007	Dead Reefs		Microsoft Windows
2007	Spaceforce: Rogue Universe		Microsoft Windows
2007	Destination: Treasure Island		Microsoft Windows
2007	Atlantis Evolution		Microsoft Windows
2007	Animates		Nintendo DS
2007	The Cameron Files: Pharaoh's Curse		Microsoft Windows
2007	Painkiller: Overdose		Microsoft Windows
2007	LifeSigns: Surgical Unit		Nintendo DS
2007	Next Life		Microsoft Windows
2007	Agatha Christie: Evil Under the Sun		Microsoft Windows
2007	Zoo Quest: Puzzle Fun		Nintendo DS, Microsoft Windows
2008	Agatha Christie: Death on the Nile		Microsoft Windows
2008	Agatha Christie: Mysteries		Microsoft Windows
2008	The Experiment		Microsoft Windows
2008	Seven Kingdoms: Conquest		Microsoft Windows
2008	Cleopatra: Riddle of the Tomb		Microsoft Windows
2008	Sherlock Holmes: Nemesis		Microsoft Windows
2008	SpellForce 2: Dragon Storm		Microsoft Windows
2008	Painkiller Triple Dose		Microsoft Windows
2008	SpellForce 2: Shadow Wars		Microsoft Windows
2008	Wildlife Zoo: Deluxe Edition		Microsoft Windows
2008	The Hardy Boys: The Hidden Theft		Microsoft Windows
2008	Drivers Ed Portable		Nintendo DS
2008	Syberia		Nintendo DS
2008	Dreamer: Horse Trainer		Nintendo DS
2008	Learn Math for Grades 1-4		Nintendo DS
2008	Dreamer: Puppy Trainer		Nintendo DS
2008	Matchstick		Nintendo DS
2009	Inkheart		Nintendo DS
2009	Dreamer: Pop Star		Nintendo DS
2009	Monster Band		Nintendo DS
2009	Dreamer Series: Babysitter		Nintendo DS
2009	Let's Play: Shops		Nintendo DS
2009	Painkiller: Resurrection		Microsoft Windows
2009	Treasure Island		Microsoft Windows
2010	Arcania: Gothic 4		Microsoft Windows
2010	Gothic II (Gold Edition)		Microsoft Windows
2010	Chaser		Microsoft Windows
2010	Painkiller: Pandemonium		Microsoft Windows
2011	Painkiller: Redemption		Microsoft Windows
