= Forever Worlds =

2004 video game

- Developer(s): Hexagon Entertainment
- Publisher(s): The Adventure Company
- Engine: Virtools
- Platform(s): Microsoft Windows
- Release: April 5, 2004
- Genre(s): Adventure

Forever Worlds, or Forever Worlds: Enter the Unknown, is an "adventure satire" video game developed by Canadian studio Hexagon Entertainment and released in 2004.

== Gameplay ==
The game engine, similar to that used in Post Mortem and Syberia, sees the player able to navigate through fixed locations, where one can then manipulate a full 360 degrees, and click to move to the next location. The gameplay is reminiscent of the DreamCatcher game Beyond Time. In order to solve the puzzles, "the player needs to think and experiment a little". Hexagon estimates that the game takes 25 to 30 hours to complete. The cursor indicates puzzles, paths, informational popups, and potential inventory items.

== Plot ==
The scientist protagonist Jack Lanser commences a quest, and not soon after his body is body-snatched, and the possessor runs off with the player's girlfriend. It is up the player, now inhabiting a different body, to right the wrongs.

== Development ==
The game was created by Courtland Shakespeare and Peter Faluisi.

Hexagon Production Manager and head of Production Peter Faluisi explained the philosophy behind the game: "Players are so experienced today and know all the clichés and are a bit jaded, so it gets harder to surprise and entertain them. That’s what we wanted to do. We wanted to make everyone smile...with [the] creativ[ity] and original[ity of] old sci-fi stories and cult movies...and have some fun again while playing a game". The audio and music was done by Steve Sauve, who also worked Hexagon's previous game Jewels of the Oracle (1995).

The development team used graphics packages like LightWave, Maya, 3DS Max, and Virtools Dev to make the game. According to Faluisi, "This allows us to do high-polygon count (hi-res) images for the 360 navigation nodes and the animations and also makes it easier to put together chunks of object oriented code with Dev’s Building Blocks technology."

== Reception ==
Reception

Review scores
Publication	Score
Adventure Gamers	1/5
GameZone	4.8/10
Jeuxvideo.com	6/20
Just Adventure	C−

The game has a Metacritic score of 31% based on 10 critic reviews.

Tap Repeatedly said "Though the game world visuals are sumptuous and the animation in the cutscenes first-rate, the dialogue doesn't play and the puzzles have none of the physical intelligence of the developer's earlier work." AdventureClassicGaming concluded "While the game possesses some excellent cinematic cut scenes and animations, it is also spoiled by far too many failings that range from a cumbersome user interface to poor storytelling to confusing puzzle mechanics."
