= Curse: The Eye of Isis =

2003 video game

- Developer: Asylum Entertainment
- Publishers: NA: DreamCatcher Interactive; EU: Wanadoo Edition
- Producer: Sai Wun Poon
- Designer: Jacqui Jomain
- Programmers: George Kartvelishvili; Ed Key; Graeme Baird; Ian Cottrell; Martin Fermor; Richard Steer
- Artist: Jason White
- Writers: Dan Gould; Louis Ho
- Composer: Mike Willox
- Platforms: Windows; Xbox; PlayStation 2
- Release: NA: October 20, 2003 (PC); NA: October 30, 2003 (Xbox); EU: November 14, 2003
- Genre: Survival horror
- Mode: Single player

Curse: The Eye of Isis is a survival horror video game that was developed by British studio Asylum Entertainment and published by DreamCatcher Interactive and Wanadoo for the Xbox, PlayStation 2 and Windows. It was released stateside for Windows in October 2003 and for Xbox in April 2004. The PlayStation 2 version was only released in Europe.

It shares the same sort of atmospheric setting, gameplay, fixed camera angles, and ammo preservation as the earlier Resident Evil games, as well as many other archetypal survival horror games in the genre, such as ObsCure and Silent Hill.

The Xbox version of the game was very briefly backwards compatible with the Xbox 360, but was removed from the list because of glitches on December 1, 2005. The game remains unplayable on that system.

== Story ==
The game is set in 1890s victorian London. Darien Dane was invited by his childhood female friend Victoria Sutton to see the egyptian exhibition at the British Museum, where an ancient and valuable statue known as the Eye of Isis, recovered by Darien's father, the archaeologist, Dr. Stanley Dane. However, upon arriving, he finds the museum is closed, because some thieves broke in and stole the statue, unleashing a powerful curse. Darien is soon trapped in the museum himself and, with the help of Abdul Wahid — a friend of his parents — faces thugs, mummies and revived dead, seeking to save his female friend and to end the curse.

== Reception ==
Reception

Aggregate scores
Aggregator	Score
GameRankings	PC: 59% XBOX: 60%
Metacritic	PC: 63/100

Review scores
Publication	Score
Computer and Video Games	PC: 5.7/10
GameSpot	PC: 6.8/10
GameSpy	PC: 3/5
GameZone	PC: 7.3/10
IGN	PC: 7.8/10
Just Adventure	PC: D
Team Xbox	Xbox: 70/100
Game Informer	Xbox: 68/100

The game received mixed reception upon release.

TeamXbox gave a mixed review, categorizing many aspects of the game as "average" or "decent." The reviewer praised the game's voice acting, but stated the game overused its "random freaky noise effect." He also found the graphics generally acceptable but they "seem[ed] just a tad too flat" and had "little life". His overall opinion was that gamers looking for an "el cheapo title" might consider it "worth the twenty bucks".

Game Informer gave a generally negative review, comparing the game to a "B-grade horror movie" and a "19th century version of Resident Evil", and stated that "the menus are clunky, the map is useless, and combat is too easy", although the controls were noted as above average, especially compared to the Resident Evil series.
