= Hauntings of Mystery Manor =

2005 point-and-click adventure video game

- Developer: Cindy Pondillo
- Publisher: Cindy Pondillo
- Engine: AGS engine
- Platform: Windows
- Release: June 15, 2005
- Genre: Adventure

Hauntings of Mystery Manor is 2005 point-and-click adventure game. It was a solo project of Cindy Pondillo; her first adventure.

== Plot and gameplay ==
The player returns to a mansion after 15 years to discover it is inhabited by ghosts.

== Critical reception ==
Tally-Ho of Just Adventure found it "remarkable" that the game had been developed by one person. Avsn-Nikki of Adventurespiele noted that the style of music is suited to each individual room. Robert Lacey of Adventure Gamers criticised the game's art, plot, writing, puzzles, and interface.
