= Jerusalem: The Three Roads to the Holy Land =

2002 video game

- Developer: Arxel Tribe
- Publisher: Cryo Interactive
- Director: Stephen Carrière
- Platform: Windows
- Release: 2002
- Genre: Adventure
- Mode: Single-player

Jerusalem: The Three Roads to the Holy Land is a 2002 historical adventure game. The game was developed by Arxel Tribe and Réunion des Musées Nationaux, and published by Cryo Interactive. It is a sequel to the game Pompei: The Legend of Vesuvius.

== Development ==
The game consists of a series of 75 interactive screens. The sets were reconstructed and validated with help from the Réunion des Musées Nationaux. The characters were made through photorealistic 3D modeling.

== Plot ==
When a Scottish cartographer by the name of Adrien Blake returns from an expedition he discovers that his fiancée, Sophia, has disappeared. He must travel to Jerusalem to search for her. The story unfolds in the year 1552.

== Critical reception ==
Jihem of JeuxVideo noted that the game had inferior graphics, while expressing that it would appeal to intellectual history enthusiasts. Laura MacDonald of Just Adventure negatively compared the game to Syberia, and suggested that Putt Putt Travels Through Time was a more sincere game than Jerusalem. 4 Players' Bodo Naser thought the game was too linear and had conversations that felt like the silent player hearing monologues from characters. Slydos of Adventure-Archiv thought the game was very short.
