= Karma: Curse of the 12 Caves =

1995 adventure video game

- Developer: InterServ International
- Publishers: Discis Knowledge Research; DreamCatcher Interactive (re-release)
- Platforms: Macintosh, Windows, PlayStation, Sega Saturn
- Release: NA: 1995 (Mac, Win); JP: 1996 (PS1, Saturn)
- Genre: Adventure
- Mode: Single-player

Karma: Curse of the 12 Caves is a 1995 FMV adventure game. In 1998, DreamCatcher Interactive re-released the game as Quest for Karma. The game was released in Japan for PlayStation and Sega Saturn as Takuramakan. In December 1995, South Korean magazine Game Champ reported that Taiwanese developer InterServ International was adapting its PC adventure game for the Sega Saturn.

== Plot ==
In the caves of Dun-Huang, a demon set a trap, so effective that it also trapped the workers who built the trap. It is the player's job to free them.

== Gameplay ==
The game plays similarly to Myst, another FMV adventure game, except this title has a narrator that guides the player through the narrative and puzzles.

== Critical reception ==
PC Game praised the game's atmosphere but disliked its illogical puzzles. Just Adventure's Ray Ivey positively compared it to two other Dreamcatcher titles: Jewels of the Oracle and Jewels II: The Ultimate Challenge.
