= The Legend of Lotus Spring =

1998 video game

- Developers: Xing Xing; Women Wise
- Publishers: CN: People's Education Press; TW: Soft-World; NA: DreamCatcher Interactive / Women Wise; FR: Syrinx
- Platforms: Windows, Macintosh
- Release: 1998
- Genre: Adventure
- Mode: Single-player

The Legend of Lotus Spring is a graphical adventure computer game co-developed by Women Wise and Xing Xing and released on Valentine's Day in 2000 in North America. It was originally released by Xing Xing in 1998 in China.

== Development ==
The game began as a project to digitally recreate the destroyed Garden of Perfect Brightness in Beijing. The project's founder, Lifeng Wang, was a graduate of the University of British Columbia and had secured the support of two of the university's computer graphics research groups, the Media and Graphics Interdisciplinary Centre (MAGIC) and Imager Laboratory. To finance the project, the Vancouver-based private company Xing Xing Computer Graphics was founded to commercialize the project via video games set in the digital reconstruction. Lotus Spring is the first of those games.

The Toronto-based publisher Women Wise found out about the game by accident; Xing Xing had sent it to many publishers, and they had found it on someone's reject pile. Women Wise founder and producer Anne-Marie Huurre took and played it, and thought it was worth pursuing. Women Wise, a company founded in the late 1990s whose corporate culture and goals are centered on encouraging women to become involved with new technology, decided that the game's fringe target market should be "older girls, young women". This is because Huurre had a positive response when she tested the finished game on women due to its animation, visuals, and pace.

She decided to target the game specifically to women due to there being so few female-targeted games on the market. Huurre proposed that Dreamcatcher Interactive distribute it. Other publishers had rejected it due to fears it wouldn't sell due to girls not playing games. Dreamcatcher believed in the concept, but required more work to be done on the game before release, so Women Wise officially became the game's second developer. Huurre added production values that would appeal specifically to the female demographic, for instance commissioning a free PDF novella set in the world of the game, which was written by romance author C. Anne Williams. Williams' research included the culture and history of the Garden of Perfect Brightness, and reading Dragon Lady: The Life and Legend of the Last Empress of China by Sterling Seagrave, and The Devil Soldier: The American Soldier of Fortune Who Became a God in China by Caleb Carr, as well as the history of the British-Sino Opium Wars. The team hoped to release the novella as an audiobook. They cross-promoted the game with the free PDF off of iReadRomance.com. There was also a contest to win a Rocket eBook from Rocket Reader when players purchased the game or entered on the Women Wise website. They were also developing CDs and a TV program to add to the project. The Legend of Lotus Spring became the first title released under the Women Wise brand.

In addition to the English version, the game was also available in Chinese (both Simplified and Traditional) and French.

== Plot and gameplay ==
The Legend of Lotus Spring is set during the Qing dynasty with a historical Chinese theme. It takes place in Beijing's Yuan Ming Yuan, a real-world location. The plot centres around the love between the ruling emperor Xian Feng and the women he loves - a concubine called He Han Qu who he renamed Lotus Spring who live together in the Garden of Perfect Brightness, until she disappears. The finished game uses a real-world historical background, and features an emotional story centered on its characters, in the style of Myst.

== Critical reception ==
In reviewing the game, IGN said that "in the quest to make a game suitable and enjoyable to a more softcore female demographic, The Legend of Lotus Spring suffers in its intelligence and quality". Interactfiction noted the game as a prime example of adventure titles where one is stuck in an unwinnable state due to an innocuous action they took early in the game, though also singled it out as an example of an adult version of a "pink game" (a video game aimed at females). WomenGamers.com praised the title's "painstaking virtual recreations". MrBillsAdventureland appreciated that while the game was not strictly educational, it gave the reviewer a sense of Chinese culture, tradition and art. Allgame praised the title's "atmosphere and story". Just Adventure enjoyed the title's "breathtaking, elegant style and rich storytelling". AdventureGamers felt the experience was delightful and beautiful. Eblong liked the title's "rich, engaging setting". MacHome hoped Women Wise would refine their skills and produce more games for the female demographic in the future. Applelinks deemed the title "a noble step into somewhat uncharted territory" - a game targeted at woman that didn't rely on unhealthy stereotypes like pink, shopping, and fashion.

It received some positive reviews, but had disappointing sales.
