= Cydonia: Mars - The First Manned Mission =

1998 adventure video game

- Developer: Aneiva Interactive
- Publisher: DreamCatcher Interactive
- Platform: Microsoft Windows
- Release: September 21, 1998
- Genre: Adventure
- Mode: Single-player

Cydonia: Mars - The First Manned Mission (aka Lightbringer: The Next Giant Leap for Mankind) is a 1998 adventure video game, and the premiere title for developer Aneiva Interactive.

== Plot ==
In the wake of Earth's imminent destruction, the player is part of a re-population mission to Mars to save the human race.

== Gameplay ==
Gameplay is similar to The 7th Guest and The 11th Hour, whereby players must complete puzzles to unlock new locations to explore.

== Release ==
In October 1999, Cydonia was re-released under the name Lightbringer by its publisher DreamCatcher Interactive. According to Ray Ivey of Adventure Gamers, the decision was made for "legal and marketing reasons", and noted that the marketing team saw the previous name and package presentation more like a reference title than an adventure game. The new edition was released on October 29, 1999.

== Critical reception ==
Reception

Review scores
Publication	Score
Computer Games Strategy Plus	3.5/5
Computer Gaming World	3/5

Rich Rouse of IGN said the game would only appeal to hardcore fans of the adventure genre. Randy Sluganski of Just Adventure deemed it an "excellent first effort", and praised it for successfully merging entertainment and education. PC Gamer's Stephen Poole criticised the lackluster characters, plot, and graphics. Heidi Fournier of Adventure Gamers thought it was an interesting entry in the adventure game genre that would also have crossover appeal to fantasy fans.
