= Silverload =

1995 video game

- European MS-DOS cover art
- Developer: Millennium Interactive
- Publishers: MS-DOS: EU: Psygnosis; NA: Nova Spring; PlayStation; Vic Tokai
- Producers: Chris Elliott; Ian Saunter
- Designer: Jason Wilson
- Programmer: Keith Hook
- Artists: Jason Wilson; Mark Rafter
- Writer: Jason Wilson
- Composer: Richard Joseph
- Platforms: MS-DOS, PlayStation
- Release: MS-DOS: EU: 1995; NA: 1995; PlayStation: NA: 10 May 1996
- Genre: Adventure
- Mode: Single-player

Silverload is a graphic adventure video game developed by Millennium Interactive and published in 1995 by Psygnosis in Europe and Vic Tokai in North America. The player controls, via a first person perspective, a Wild West cowboy as he ventures into a haunted town in order to save a child that was taken from his parents. The U.S. Entertainment Software Rating Board gave the game a "M" rating for its graphic violence, blood and gore, and profanity. Silverload was released for MS-DOS in Europe and the original PlayStation edition released internationally.

== Plot ==
In 1879, a half-Native American bounty hunter known as "The Gunslinger" is hired by a travelling settler to rescue his son, Ben, who was kidnapped by supernatural raiders. Following the raiders' trail, the Gunslinger arrives in Silverload, a mysterious silver mining town that the settlers had previously visited. In the town's hotel, he meets Leo Remmington, an archeologist hired by the town; Leo explains that his partner, Carl Whitehead, believed the town to be cursed and has now disappeared. Meanwhile, the Sheriff is ordered by Silverload's Preacher to find Whitehead, and eliminate the Gunslinger.

The Gunslinger goes on to explore the town the next day, gathering items, meeting the townsfolk and having more strange encounters. In the tavern, he meets Sheila, the Sheriff's mistress, who offers her assistance in saving Ben. In an abandoned blacksmith's shop, he comes across Carl Whitehead, slowly losing his mind and undergoing transformation into a vampire. The Gunslinger manages to subdue Whitehead with a bucket of pig's blood, allowing him to flee; reading his journal, he learns that the archeologists were hired to remove the Native American remains underneath the hotel, before Whitehead was infected by one of the townsfolk while exploring.

Entering the town hall, the Gunslinger witnesses the Mayor's transformation into a werewolf. Reading his journal, he learns that the Mayor, Sheriff and Preacher orchestrated the massacre of a nearby Native American tribe. The sole survivor of the massacre, a Native shaman, then cursed the townsfolk to be unable to leave Silverload and transform into monstrous creatures harmed by silver; in response, the Preacher formed The Order, a satanic cult seeking the means by which to escape the town. By examining the remains underneath the hotel, the Gunslinger acquires a skull holding a Native spirit, which asks to be buried at a shrine. At the graveyard, the Gunslinger discovers the bodies of his adoptive parents; the spirit explains that they were killed by the Sheriff while they were visiting Silverload, and the Gunslinger swears vengeance.

Reuniting with Sheila, the Gunslinger learns that the Sheriff captured her father to force her compliance and sire her into a vampire. He agrees to help Sheila and spends the night with her; if not wearing the silver pendant, Sheila will sire him as well, forcing the Gunslinger to use a temporary cure to the transformation. The Gunslinger travels with Sheila to Silverload's mining camp, where captured humans are being forced to work, and rescues Sheila's father. Within the mines, he acquires dynamite and silver to use against the townsfolk. By burying the skull at the mountain shrine, he meets a powerful spirit named Wolfstar, and convinces him to destroy Silverload for good.

The Sheriff attempts to capture the Gunslinger by threatening Sheila and her father, but is deterred by dynamite. In response, he kills both Sheila and her father with silver bullets. Using a train boiler and a bullet mould, the Gunslinger fashions silver bullets of his own, and defeats the Sheriff in a final showdown. He then infiltrates Silverload's church, where the Preacher attempts to free himself from the town by offering Ben as a sacrifice. Instead, the Gunslinger rescues Ben, kills the Preacher and his minions, and demolishes the church using the leftover dynamite. Wolfstar destroys Silverload, while the Gunslinger and Ben escape.

== Gameplay ==
As is the case with other graphic adventure games, progress in Silverload involves finding and interacting with various "hot spots" in order to pick up objects, solve puzzles and interact with (or kill) the various characters in the town. Picking up certain objects will cause the game's (and town's) clock to move forward, and thus, the trick to success is to pick up the right items in the precise order. Otherwise, the player must restart the game from the beginning, or from the last save point.

== Reception ==
Reception

Review scores
Publication	Score
IGN	6/10 (PS1)
Next Generation	(PS1)

The initial European PC release was universally panned by critics. Just Adventure gave it an F grade, and listed it as one of the five worst adventure games of all time in their Dungeon of Shame feature. The review stated that the "few minor details" of "jerky animation, incoherent puzzles, bad interface and horrendous lip-synching ... separate Silverload from the gaming classics," and attested the one redeeming factor was its plot.

The PlayStation release, however, was not a direct port, but an entire reworking of the title that actually received a few positive reviews. Scary Larry gave it a heavily mixed review in GamePro. He lambasted the graphics and sounds, citing poor illustrations for the static graphics and offensive ethnic stereotypes in the voice acting, but said the gameplay is more interesting than most point-and-click adventures. He recommended that players rent the game rather than buy it. Unlike Scary Larry, a reviewer for Next Generation was actually pleased with the illustrations, saying they "give even the relatively 'normal' scenes in the game a strange, ethereal glow." He also praised the dialogue, challenge, and generally chilling atmosphere, though he criticized that the hot-spot based interface makes the control difficult even when using the PlayStation Mouse. He summarized Silverload as "a game that, while following a genre's conventions, simply does everything smashingly well." IGN was also positive, claiming "Great graphics and a compelling horror story set in the Old West make for a truly remarkable game." Like Next Generation, they found the game's one major flaw to be the hot-spot based interface, concurring that using the PlayStation Mouse does not help the problem.

In a 2012 retrospective feature, John Szczepaniak of Hardcore Gaming 101 claimed the "PSOne update, has a number of clever ideas to separate itself from the adventure game pack" and praised its "good ideas, fantastic setting, great script and suitable voice acting", also stating "the 3D shooting sections are very slick and extremely awesome." The game is also occasionally listed for being one of the weirdest western works ever created, and the PlayStation version is also considered a collectable for being one of only a handful of titles released in the bumpy-cased longbox packaging.
