= Agassi Tennis Generation =

2002 video game

- North American box art for PS2
- Developer: Aqua Pacific
- Publisher: DreamCatcher Interactive
- Platforms: Microsoft Windows, PlayStation 2, Game Boy Advance
- Release: Windows: EU: 2002; Game Boy Advance: NA: July 2003; EU: November 21, 2003; PlayStation 2: NA: August 15, 2003; EU: December 5, 2003
- Genre: Sports
- Modes: Single player Multiplayer

Agassi Tennis Generation is a tennis sports game developed by Aqua Pacific and published by DreamCatcher Interactive for Microsoft Windows, PlayStation 2 and Game Boy Advance. The game features former tennis player Andre Agassi.

== Gameplay ==
In the PlayStation 2 version, the game features 16 tournaments and 12 courts. It has various court surfaces and three game modes: Quick Match, Arcade and Championship. There are 32 tennis players with varying abilities in speed, strength, and stamina. Championship offers players 10,000 dollars and a number of choices on which to spend it, e.g. coaches, personal trainers, talent agents etc.

Each individual can help improve an athlete's abilities in specific areas over time. Quick Match drops players onto a court for a single match, while Arcade is designed to offer players a more simplified control scheme. Championship has players competing against a series of fictitious opponents on each of the 12 courts to win prize money. The PlayStation 2 version of the game features motion-capture animation from Agassi himself.

In the Game Boy Advance version, there are four modes: Quick Match, Arcade, Championship, and Multiplayer Multipack, which requires a link cable, another Game Boy Advance, and another copy of the game. Gamers choose from ten tennis player characters to compete in both single and double matches in courts set in the UK, France, Germany, Australia, Italy and the United States.

== Reception ==
Agassi Tennis Generation received praise for its realistic gameplay.

Reception

Aggregate score
Aggregator	Score
Metacritic	(PS2) 53/100

Review scores
Publication	Score
Computer and Video Games	(PC) 6/10
GameSpot	(PS2) 5.3/10
PC Zone	(PC) 40%

The PlayStation 2 version received "mixed" reviews according to the review aggregation website Metacritic. Game Chronicles editor Mark Smith criticized the game for its "total lack of practice modes, mini-games, or tutorials" but stating that fans of the genre "will appreciate the slick interface, fluid controls, and realistic gameplay". GameSpot's Ryan Davis criticized the game for its "short list of options, buggy gameplay, and generally tepid presentation".

The PC version received mixed reviews, with Steve Hill of PC Zone stating "Reviewing this on a borderline minimum spec PC, it proved to be muck of the highest order, with the computer controlled players largely incapable of hitting the ball, rendering matches little more than a banal sequence of unlikely aces and tedious double faults" despite the fact that the A.I. players are "able to return serves and take part in vaguely competitive rallies" on a slightly more powerful PC.
