= Dracula: Crazy Vampire =

2001 video game

- Cover art
- Developer: Planet Interactive Development
- Publisher: DreamCatcher Interactive
- Platform: Game Boy Color
- Release: 9 October 2001
- Genre: Action
- Mode: Single-player

Dracula: Crazy Vampire is a 2001 action game for the Game Boy Color developed by Planet Interactive Development and published by DreamCatcher Interactive. The game was licensed as part of the Universal Studios Monsters franchise used for Universal Studios books and toys featuring Count Dracula.

== Gameplay ==
A screenshot of Dracula: Crazy Vampire.

Dracula is a top-down action game in which the player as Count Dracula is tasked with uniting vampires across eleven countries against Great Inquisitor Torquemada. Players navigate a series of maze-like levels and using bats to defeat enemies, whilst solving a number of rudimentary puzzles such as moving crates or flipping door switches. Dracula features several mechanics specific to vampire mythology, including a health system that requires the player to suck blood from human enemies, and draining health when the player is exposed to sunlight.

== Reception ==
Reception

Review scores
| Publication | Score |
|---|---|
| AllGame | 2.5/5 |
| Game Boy Xtreme | 62% |

Dracula received mixed to negative reviews. Game Boy Extreme dismissed the game as "nothing special", with "no character progression (and) no plot", with Jamie Wilks finding the game to be a "rather dull adventure game" that contained "ridiculous" dialogue and "repetitive" combat.
