= Panzer Elite Action: Fields of Glory =

2006 video game

- Developers: ZootFly; Wizarbox (PS2)
- Publisher: JoWooD Productions
- Series: Panzer Elite Action
- Platforms: Windows; PlayStation 2; Xbox
- Release: EU: March 24, 2006 (PC); EU: July 14, 2006 (PS2); EU: August 11, 2006 (Xbox)
- Genre: Vehicular combat
- Modes: Single-player, multiplayer

Panzer Elite Action: Fields of Glory is a video game developed by ZootFly and published by JoWooD Productions exclusively in Europe in 2006.

== Gameplay ==
Panzer Elite Action: Fields of Glory is a World War II tank action game, in which the player can command a platoon of either German (4 tanks) or American (5 tanks) forces in three scenarios: the Tunisian campaign (1943), the Italian campaign (1943–44) and the Battle of Normandy (1944), each one featuring a series of battles. Later on, fans developed new scenarios in North Africa (1940–41) and the Soviet Union (1941).

The player can roster the crew for each tank in his platoon, based on their skills, which increase over time. New members become available over time, for replacement of dead and wounded. They may also be awarded historical medals.

Each battle station on the player's tank may be occupied, and the gun sighting may be set to be very realistic. Better tanks become available during the course of time (Tiger I for Germans, later models of Sherman for Americans), close to the real availability of these models during WWII. Every few kilometres there are repair and ammo stations for when the tank is damaged by enemy fire. There is also a multiplayer mode for up to 32 players in each server, and the player gets to choose which tank they may use.

There are 18 missions, for German, Russian and allied campaigns. The first few missions are fairly beginner-friendly and easy, and they gradually get tougher and tougher as the player progresses. The game is very detailed and quite realistic, with most of the major tanks of World War II included in the various missions. There are night missions, where the player goes under cover in a captured enemy tank.

=== Singleplayer ===
The game is divided into three campaigns, German, Russian and Allied as mentioned before. The first is the German. The player takes part in the invasions of Poland and France, then helps Operation Barbarossa succeed. The last German mission is Stalingrad, where the player takes part in the taking of Stalingrad. The next campaign is the Russian. The player's first mission in this campaign is to complete the encirclement of Stalingrad, then to halt Operation Winter Storm by destroying an armoured supply train and drive the Germans out of the city. Then the player has to stop a German advance and destroy some long range artillery. Then the player goes under cover in a captured Panther tank and free some Soviet POW's, and finally to win the Battle of Kursk. The next campaign is allied where the player takes part in the successful landings at Normandy in June 1944. Then, the player destroys some V2 rockets and finally make it out of the dreaded Bocage. The next is probably the hardest mission in the game, where the player is up against nothing but Tigers and Panthers and has to get the tank ace Michael Wittmann. Then the player has to stop the German counter-attack at the Battle of The Bulge and go under cover again in a captured King Tiger to stop the Germans blowing up a dam and flooding the valley, and the final mission is the final drive to the Rhine.

The player has the opportunity to use both the primary (cannon) and secondary (machine gun) armaments while in combat. The game itself is the story of three tank commanders, one for each campaign. While playing, the crews often "talk" to each other, when the quotes show up on the screen. The player often receives praise when they knock out an enemy tank or shoot an enemy soldier, e.g. "Good Shot", and "Score one for the good guys" and complaints in instances of friendly fire.

=== Multiplayer ===
The multiplayer mode is an outstanding feature of the game. It can be accessed by the main menu. Players often create "clans" when playing. The game features seven multiplayer maps, Mairy-Sur-Marne, Kursk, Bocage, Shestakov, Stalingrad, Bingen-Am-Rhine and Huertgen. Players can connect to servers of up 32 players. In line with other online-enabled games on the Xbox, multiplayer on Xbox Live was available to players until April 15, 2010. Panzer Elite Action: Fields of Glory is now playable online again on the replacement Xbox servers called Insignia.

The player has the opportunity in the multiplayer mode to use either the cannon or alternate weapon (airstrikes for light tanks, mines for medium tanks and supply drops for heavy tanks) in the multiplayer mode, as opposed to single-player where the alternate weapon is always the co-axial machine gun.

Percentage of friendly fire, score limit and time connection limit can all be set when hosting a server, and sometimes players set player limit too.

== Add-ons ==
In 2007 JoWood released an add-on, Panzer Elite Action: Dunes of War to the game. It features the "African Chapter" of the war, and contains two new campaigns including German and Allied, and ten all-new multiplayer maps.

A U.S. version of the game, First Battalion, was released on 21 August 2006.

== Reception ==
Reception

Aggregate score
Aggregator	Score		
Aggregator	PC	PS2	Xbox
Metacritic	58/100	44/100	60/100

Review scores
Publication	Score		
Publication	PC	PS2	Xbox
Eurogamer	4/10	N/A	N/A
GamesMaster	N/A	40%	N/A
PlayStation Official Magazine – UK	N/A	5/10	N/A
Official Xbox Magazine (UK)	N/A	N/A	6/10
PC Format	70%	N/A	N/A
PC Gamer (UK)	65%	N/A	N/A
Play	N/A	28%	N/A
PSM3	N/A	56%	N/A

The PC and Xbox versions received "mixed" reviews, while the PlayStation 2 version received "generally unfavorable reviews", according to the review aggregation website Metacritic.
