= The Messenger (2000 video game) =

- North American Windows cover art
- Developers: 4x Technologies; Arxel Tribe; Visual Impact
- Publishers: Wanadoo Edition; Canal+ Multimedia; Réunion des Musées Nationaux; Microïds (PlayStation and Mac version); DreamCatcher Interactive (North America)
- Platforms: Mac OS, PlayStation, Windows, iOS
- Release: macOS: EU: 2000; WW: 15 March 2012; Windows: EU: 9 November 2000; NA: 14 February 2001; PlayStation: EU: 16 November 2000; iOS; 14 March 2012
- Genre: Adventure game
- Mode: Single-player

The Messenger (original French title: Louvre: L'Ultime Malédiction, "Louvre: The Final Curse") is an adventure game released in Europe in 2000, and in North America in February 2001. It was co-developed by 4x Technologies, Arxel Tribe and Visual Impact and jointly published by Wanadoo Edition, Canal+ Multimedia and the Réunion des Musées Nationaux.

== Plot ==
The Secret Service Agent Morgane Sinclair has been charged with the mission to retrieve four mystical artifacts called Satan's Keys from the Louvre Museum. These four keys, when joined together, cause complete global annihilation. Morgan goes back in time to three periods in time when various kings used the Louvre as their residential palaces: Charles V Mediaeval period, Henry IV Renaissance period, Louis XV 1789 French Revolution period, and then return safely to present day. In this race against evil and against time, she needs to find the keys before the vengeful descendants of an evil cult of Black Templars combine these mystic artifacts, triggering Armageddon.

== Reception ==
Reception

Aggregate score
Aggregator	Score
Metacritic	61/100

Review scores
Publication	Score
Adventure Gamers	3.5/5
AllGame	3.5/5
Computer Games Magazine	3/5
GameSpot	5.9/10
GameZone	7.5/10
IGN	6.1/10
PC Gamer (US)	64%

The Messenger received "mixed" reviews according to the review aggregation website Metacritic. Ron Dulin of GameSpot wrote: "There are two types of adventure games. There are those in which the puzzles and story are fully integrated with the game, and one lends itself to the other. And there are those that are primarily a series of puzzles, in which the story, if there even is one, is an afterthought. The Messenger is an average example of the second type, desperately trying to pass itself off as the first." According to Robert Gerbino of GameZone, "everything about this game is solid. Unfortunately there is nothing about it that will knock you into next week. If you are an adventure guru, then it's worth your paper."
