= The Forgotten: It Begins =

1999 video game

- Developer: Ransom Interactive
- Publisher: DreamCatcher Interactive
- Engine: mTropolis
- Platforms: Mac OS, Windows
- Release: NA: November 12, 1999
- Genre: Adventure game
- Mode: Single-player

The Forgotten: It Begins is a 1999 adventure/puzzle video game developed by Ransom Interactive and published by DreamCatcher Interactive. A sequel was to be released called The Forgotten II: The Collection. The Forgotten narrative was originally supposed to last over 7 games ("modules"), but these were never completed.

== Development ==
The game was created using the mTropolis game engine with over a thousand hours of work put into the game.

The concept of serialisation was decided early on in the development of The Forgotten storyline in 1995 - a franchise that runs over seven games ("modules"). The genre of game was due to the response from customers regarding Dreamcatcher's earlier titles Beyond Time and Jewels of the Oracle, which expressed a desire for "non-violent, adventure/puzzle style games".

The website went live on October 19, 1999. The unreleased game Thibedeaux: Escape from Hell, was to be based on a character from The Forgotten; a multi-level demo was planned for E3 in the spring of 2000, but did not materialize. The game shipped on November 15 of the same year to EBX, Babbages, Microcenter and other stores, and could also be purchased online off Dreamcatcher Games Online Store.

The Forgotten II: The Collection picked up where the original left off plot-wise. The narrative was originally supposed to be covered in 7 games; by April 2000, complete storyline for all seven modules had been fully developed, and the story arcs and puzzles for Episodes 2 and 3 were completed. At this time, the modeling and artwork has begun, and the game interface had been reworked to allow for larger panoramas and puzzles. A new gaming engine was also being developed for better flexibility and performance in Forgotten II and future games. The first two titles were to be released on single CDs, while the 3rd-7th were to be targeted for DVD.

== Gameplay and plot ==
The objective of the game is to find Richard Haliburton, who has gone missing in the city of New Orleans.

== Critical reception ==
While critics appreciated the game's atmosphere and approachability, as well as its intriguing premise, the game was also criticized for its short length and poorly-developed story. Others criticized the game's lack of urgency or danger.

It received a score of 1.5 out of 5 from Computer Games Magazine.
