= Necronomicon: The Dawning of Darkness =

2000 video game

- Developer: Wanadoo Edition
- Publishers: Wanadoo Edition; Cryo Interactive; DreamCatcher Interactive (North America)
- Platforms: Windows, PlayStation
- Release: Windows: FRA: November 10, 2000; NA: May 11, 2001; EU: 2001; PlayStation: PAL: November 9, 2001
- Genres: Horror, adventure
- Mode: Single-player

Necronomicon: The Dawning of Darkness, also known as Necronomicon: The Gateway to Beyond and Necronomicon : L'Aube des ténèbres in French, is a 2000 video game developed by Wanadoo Edition and released for Windows and the PlayStation video game console.

== Synopsis ==
The game is set in 1927, where the ordinary life of William H. Stanton is affected by matters of the occult and darker truths about our world.

The game starts off in William Stanton's home in Providence, Rhode Island, where he is startled by a knock at his door. As William opens the door he discovers that it is his close friend Edgar acting in a suspicious manner. He gives William a metallic pyramid and tells him not to give it to anyone, including him, especially if he asks for it. After going back inside there is a knock at the door again. This time it's Dr. Egleton, a friend of Edgar's father. He asks William to visit Edgar at his home soon so he can help decide whether or not Edgar should be committed for insanity.

The game then picks up and the player has to solve a series of puzzles and question shady people to find out what is going on, and uncover the truth about the horrible fate that has befallen Edgar.

== Gameplay ==
The player moves and interacts with the left mouse button while clicking the right mouse button brings up the inventory. It is a linear point and click adventure where the player can only do a few minor actions out of order.

The game has 4 difficulty levels, 20 3D-modeled characters, several game overs, and original music.

== Critical reception ==
Reception

Review scores
Publication	Score
Puntaeclicca	Mixed
Jeuxvideo.com	14/20
Gry Online	6.5/10
AdventureClassicGaming	3/5
Game Over Online	22/40
All Game Guide	3/5
Quandary	3/5
Gameboomers	56%
Gamezone	6/10
GameOver	63%
GameKult	4/10
UHS	2/5
MeriStation	3.5/10
Just Adventure	D
Aventuraycia	1/5
Game Captain	61%
