= Crystal Key 2 =

2004 video game

- Developers: Earthlight Productions, Kheops Studio
- Publisher: The Adventure Company
- Platform: Windows
- Release: NA: 17 March 2004; EU: 24 September 2004
- Genre: Graphic adventure
- Mode: Single-player

Crystal Key 2, known in Europe as Evany: Key to a Distant Land, is a 2004 graphic adventure game developed by Canadian studio Earthlight Productions, together with Kheops Studio. It was published by The Adventure Company, and is the sequel to the 1999 title The Crystal Key.

== Gameplay and plot ==
Crystal Key 2's plot builds upon that of the original, and casts the player as Call, who seeks to stop the minions of Ozgar and save the world of Evany.

== Development ==
The game was revealed by DreamCatcher Interactive's Adventure Company label in April 2003, at first under the name Crystal Key II: The Far Realm. It was among a slew of announcements in preparation for the 2003 Electronic Entertainment Expo (E3), and Marek Bronstring of Adventure Gamers called it one of the publisher's "top titles premiering at the show", alongside Traitors Gate II: Cypher. Earthlight Productions developed the game with Virtools and V-Ray. It was designed to feature spherical 360° panoramas, unlike its predecessor's more limited viewing areas. According to John Matheson, Earthlight sought to overcome the problems that had affected The Crystal Key's production pipeline and give its art team more room "to be as creative as possible".

Initially developed by Earthlight and set for a late-2003 release, the game underwent "many years" of production and took longer than The Adventure Company had wanted, Benoît Hozjan of Kheops Studio later remarked. As a result, Kheops was hired to co-develop the game late in production, which Hozjan said included "the programming and the integration, hand in hand with John Matheson." In July 2003, Matheson estimated the game as 75% complete and on track for December, but it ultimately launched in the U.S. in March 2004.

== Reception ==
Reception

Aggregate score
Aggregator	Score
Metacritic	59/100

Review scores
Publication	Score
4Players	72%
Adventure Gamers	2.5/5
Computer Gaming World	2/5
Gamekult	3/10
GameSpot	6.2/10
GameSpy	4/5
GameZone	7.2/10
IGN	5.9/10
Jeuxvideo.com	6/20
PC Gamer (US)	42%

The game received "mixed" reviews according to the review aggregation website Metacritic.
