= Panzer Elite Action: Dunes of War =

2007 video game

- Developer(s): ZootFly
- Publisher(s): JoWood; GFI; Russobit-M
- Platform(s): Windows
- Release: RUS: January 26, 2007; EU: February 9, 2007; NA: April 24, 2007; AU: April 3, 2008
- Genre(s): Real-time strategy
- Mode(s): Single-player, Multiplayer

Panzer Elite Action: Dunes of War is an arcade shooter real-time strategy simulation game that was developed by ZootFly. The game was published by JoWooD Entertainment in European Union, and by GFI and Russobit-M in Russia. The game was published by DreamCatcher Interactive in North America.

== Gameplay ==
Panzer Elite Action: Dunes of War is the African chapter to Panzer Elite Action: Fields of Glory. Panzer Elite Action: Dunes of War sends the player into the desert, leading a tank squad during the battles of the African World War II campaign.

The game features 6 new levels in two campaigns, including Germans and Allies, 10 new multiplayer maps with different environments and styles and Conquest and Capture the Flag multiplayer mode for up to 32 players.
