= Emergency Fire Response =

2003 video game

- Developer: Monte Cristo Multimedia
- Publisher: DreamCatcher Interactive
- Designer: Jean-Philippe Depotte
- Platform: Microsoft Windows
- Release: NA: July 29, 2003
- Genre: Simulation
- Mode: Single-player

Emergency Fire Response (a.k.a. Fire Department in Europe and Fire Chief in UK) is a simulation video game released for Microsoft Windows on July 29, 2003, by DreamCatcher Interactive. In this game, the player takes control of a team of firefighters from the fictional Fire Station 615. There are more than thirty missions within nine scenarios, each featuring different challenges which must be met with a range of different tactics.

In this game, the player is able to take advantage of the individual talents of each member of his firefighting team. These include paramedics, High Risk Environment Specialists, and Technical Officers. Players can also use a number of different support vehicles, including ambulances and ladder trucks, to help complete missions. Players are also able to choose the appearance of their firefighting units based on the different appearances of firefighters in different parts of the world, but this does not change the overall experience of the game.

== Reception ==
PC Gamer found the camera view awkward to rotate and that it is a good value game.

Strategy Informer highly recommended the game, as it was something different to warfare and Empire building.

== Sequels ==
Two sequels have been made: Fire Department 2 (a.k.a. Firefighter Command Raging Inferno in North America) and Fire Department 3.

== See also ==
- Emergency (video game series)
