= Project Earth: Starmageddon =

2002 video game

- Developer(s): Lemon Interactive
- Publisher(s): DreamCatcher Interactive Inc.
- Composer(s): Marcin Czartyński
- Platform(s): Windows 98/XP
- Release: April 26, 2002
- Genre(s): RTS
- Mode(s): Single-player, multiplayer

Project Earth: Starmageddon is a science fiction space-based real-time strategy video game developed by Lemon Interactive (an early incarnation of a Polish company that would be later known as City Interactive) and published on April 26, 2002 by DreamCatcher Games for Microsoft Windows. It follows a conflict between human and alien factions, the latter being "Daemons".

It was also released as simply "Starmageddon" in its native country and "Project Stars" in parts of Europe (e. g. Germany).

The game is noted for its unusual control scheme for the strategy genre. While the traditional point-click-drag-drop control scheme is also available and used for utilizing few interface options, the game's default control mode is modeled after first-person shooters, with movement of the mouse rotating the camera rather than simply moving the cursor, movement keys used to pan the camera and the mouse wheel being used to set the distance of the targeting reticule from the camera.

== Development ==
Development on Starmageddon started in 2000, and at first it was developed as a Space flight combat game before making the switch to the strategy genre early in development.

The game received a sequel released in 2004 as Starmageddon 2: Project Freedom in its native country and Space Interceptor: Project Freedom in United States. In a reverse situation of the first game's development, Starmageddon 2 started out its development as a strategy game but was overhauled into a space combat game mid-development.
