= China: The Forbidden City =

1998 video game

- Developer(s): Cryo Interactive Entertainment
- Publisher(s): Cryo Interactive Entertainment; Canal+ Multimedia; Réunion des Musées Nationaux
- Producer(s): Alain Le Diberder
- Platform(s): Windows, PlayStation
- Release: 1998
- Genre(s): Adventure
- Mode(s): Single-player

China: The Forbidden City (French: Chine: Intrigue dans la Cité interdite) is a 1998 adventure video game developed by Cryo Interactive Entertainment and jointly-published by Cryo, Canal+ Multimedia and the Réunion des Musées Nationaux.

== Gameplay ==
China: The Forbidden City is a first person point-and-click adventure game. The player is often tasked with solving puzzles, commonly with the assistance of the in-game encyclopedia.

== Plot ==
The game is set in 1775 in the Forbidden City. Superintendent Anjing is summoned by the Qianlong Emperor in the early hours to investigate the death of chief eunuch Wang. He retrieves a letter from the Empress dowager, in which Wang reveals a conspiracy where he was forcedly implicated in the illegal copying of documents and imperial seals, part of a vast plot to kill and replace the emperor. To unravel the plot and expose the culprits, Wang has carefully dissimulated clues and confessions throughout different parts of the city, including offices, palaces, the Imperial Gardens and more.

The game features an encyclopedic mode and an interactive guide to the city.

== Development ==
Cryo Interactive's 1998 suite of historical adventure games (including "Egypt", "China", and "Venice") achieved a net profit up 121% to 12.6 million francs while turnover grew by 54% to 239 million francs.

== Voice actors ==
| Character | Voice actor |
|---|---|
| Superintendent An | David Gasman |
| Lady Shouxiu | Karen Strassman |
| Great Councillor Yu | Jerry Di Giacomo |
| Superintendent Da | Leslie Clack |
| Prince Yong | Gay Marshall |
| Master Wei | Allan Wenger |
| Director Li | Steve Gadler |
| Assessor Yang | Christian Erickson |
| Lady Fu | Sharon Mann |
| Chief Ma | Ian Marshall |
| Chief Wen | James Shuman |
| Chief Jin | Michael Morris |
| Emperor Qianlong | Leslie Clack |
| Chao | Christian Erickson |
| Hua Bao | Gay Marshall |
| Chief Wang | Ian Marshall |
| August Empress Douairiere | Gay Marshall |
| Chief Lu | Jerry Di Giacomo |
| Keeper of the August Seals | Michael Morris |
| Meilin | Gay Marshall |
| Guards | Allan Wenger |
| Officials | Steve Gadler |

== Reception ==
Reception

Review score
| Publication | Score |
|---|---|
| PC Gaming World | 4/10 |

According to Cryo Interactive's marketing manager Mattieu Saint-Dennis, China: The Forbidden City sold 210,000 units in Europe alone by December 2000. Of this number, France accounted for 60,000 copies. Michel Richard of the Réunion des Musées Nationaux noted that China ultimately "lost money", which the team blamed on the game's setting.

Jeux video argued that the encyclopedia featured within the title is more valuable than the game itself. Adventure Gamers described the game as "calm, languid, elegant, oriental". Les Echose praised the game's technical prowess and breathtaking 3D. Metzomagic found it off that some of the character spoke with a Scottish accent. La Nacion felt the title could have an application for parents to help their kids study. MeriStation felt it was an adequate game while not pushing any boundaries, and that it was identical in gameplay to Cryo Interactive's Versailles 1685 which had been released a month earlier. Just Adventure praised the title for being "entertainingly immersive and educational".
