= Harbinger (video game) =

2003 adventure role-playing video game

- Developer(s): Silverback Entertainment
- Publisher(s): DreamCatcher Interactive
- Platform(s): Microsoft Windows
- Release: NA: February 25, 2003
- Genre(s): Role-playing

Harbinger is an adventure role-playing video game by American studio Silverback Entertainment published in 2003 by DreamCatcher Interactive. The game takes place on a massive space ship inhabited by multiple warring races and a band of refugees. The player has the choice of three characters with their own unique quests, items, and full-game storylines.
