= Rock Manager =

2001 video game

- Developer: Monsterland Produktion
- Publishers: SWE: PAN Interactive; NA: DreamCatcher Interactive; UK: Mindscape
- Platform: Windows
- Release: SWE: 2001; NA: June 30, 2002
- Genre: Business simulation game
- Mode: Single-player

Rock Manager is a business simulation game for Microsoft Windows.

== Gameplay ==
Rock Manager puts the player in control of a rock band with the task of making them into rockstars.

Play starts with putting a band together. The players can choose from a list of musicians with all tastes and styles. They can record a demo in a studio, and add effects to the song to make it fit the band's image. With a demo in hand, it is up to the player to bag a record deal, arrange gigs, promote the record and go on the road, but it is important to keep an eye on the musicians and keep them happy or the band might self-destruct.

Options are selected using an icon system, but recording and practicing takes place in real time.

There are five styles of music the players can use: Rock, Pop, Dance, Punk and Heavy metal.
