= Genesis Rising: The Universal Crusade =

2007 video game

- Developer: Metamorf Studios
- Publisher: DreamCatcher Interactive
- Platform: Microsoft Windows
- Release: AU: March 19, 2007; NA: March 20, 2007; EU: May 4, 2007
- Genre: RTS
- Modes: Single-player, Multiplayer

Genesis Rising: The Universal Crusade is a 3D Real-time strategy game set in a distant future. The game was developed by Metamorf, published by DreamCatcher Interactive and released in 2007. The game takes place in space, where players control ships and try to eliminate the opponent. The game's primary focus is on squad tactics. The story is set in a mysterious futuristic universe where organic machines are built using genetic engineering. The player take on the role of Captain Iconah to explore and conquer the Universal Heart, the only part of the universe that's remained unconquered by the forces of humankind. Many of the ships are made of organic rather than synthetic material.

== Plot ==
After humanity almost became extinct at the hands of alien factions, the remaining humans rallied and conquered the universe apart from the Universal Heart, which spawned all life. As Captain Iconah, the player seeks out the Heart.

The Church appoints Vicar Juno to accompany him. When they enter the Lifewave Galaxy, they discover mysterious stone altars filled with bloodair (the essence of the Heart) and an organid ship near them. Then they meet the Cy-breed, a race of cyborg aliens. After a fierce battle, Iconah learns that the Cy-breed thought they were the Defiance who are recruiting to fight an alien race whom they are at war with. The Cy-breed and Iconah fend off the Defiance. Based on the player's choice, they fight at a trade system or the Cy-breed homeworld. Choosing to seek out this Defiance, Iconah's fleet comes to a sector filled with aliens humanity conquered in the past and have developed a new gene (Breeder) designed to fight the organids. Iconah manages to steal the gene and escape to the Great Trade Nexus where merchant Fax Chance gave them the coordinates to a possible clue to the Heart. Arriving in another system filled with altars, Iconah sees that the Defiance are at civil war because its leader, Loodweeg plans to destroy the Lapis altars for unknown reasons. Fending off the Defiance and protecting two altars, Iconah gets a call from Loodweeg himself who explains that the Lapis depend on the altars to find their way across the galaxy.

Iconah follows the bloodair trail to a frozen system, inhabited by the Cold Whites, an all-female race. After defeating a group of pirates, Iconah contacts the Whites. In a movie clip, the organid shape former accidentally enlarges the image of Il, the Cold Whites' leader, to where her torso fills the entire bridge, They then shrank it down to its proper size. Il directed Iconah to a system with Lapis altars and Cy-breed ships who were brought in for sacrifice to the Lapis. The humans demonstrated the power of the organids compared to the Lapis ships. After they destroy all Lapis ships, Judge Infinity arrives, towing along a Cathedral class-mothership. After talking, Iconah challenges Juno to take his fleet and destroy the Defiance. Based on what choices are made, either Juno goes alone or Infinity joins him. The player can ask for the assistance of the Cy-breed in this battle.

Two years after Juno defeated the Defiance, the Lifewave Galaxy and the Cy-Breed Empire had sworn their fealty to the Human Empire. Juno was then planning on performing a church mass and had Iconah seek out the Cy-breed leader, Nell Exer, and the others, Il and Infinity. Once all the guests were present, the Lapis attack the sector. Nell and Il flee while the humans fend for themselves. Retreating to Infinity's base, they succeed in stopping the Lapis from attacking them. Iconah deduces that the ship Il gave them as a gift is filled with bloodair. Juno assigns Iconah to execute both Loodweeg and Il for this. After obtaining the severed heads of the fallen leaders, Iconah is then directed to the Cerebrals. The player has the choice of doing some tasks for the Cerebrals or get the information by force. Either way, the player has to battle the Cerebrals. Iconah's fleet then comes to Rock City where he has to retrieve a Lapis altar in order to open a portal. After defending the altar from the Lapis, Iconah's fleet goes through.

By some joke, Iconah comes back to the day of his fifth birthday in his child form. His father explains they have to repeat everything again. After destroying two waves of organic ships, Iconah then enters another portal. There, he finds the rest of his fleet who he manages to convince he is real. Defeating the three gate guardians, the fleet escapes the time zone created by the Heart. Iconah is then reunited with Juno who had spent 50 years in the distant past, planning on eliminating all aliens before they can attack Earth in the future. Iconah attacks Juno but he escapes. He then makes contact with the Lapis. He goes to the Lapis homeworld and makes an alliance with the Lapis. The Lapis and Iconah defeat the Inquisition. He stops the mad vicer and restores the timeline.

== Reception ==
Reception

Aggregate score
Aggregator	Score
Metacritic	57/100

Review scores
Publication	Score
1Up.com	D−
Eurogamer	5/10
GameRevolution	D
GameSpot	5/10
GameSpy	2.5/5
GameZone	5.5/10
Hardcore Gamer	2.75/5
IGN	6.5/10
PC Gamer (US)	73%
X-Play	3/5

The game received "mixed" reviews according to the review aggregation website Metacritic.

== See also ==
- Homeworld
- Homeworld: Cataclysm
- Homeworld 2
- Nexus: The Jupiter Incident
- Sins of a Solar Empire
- Haegemonia (DreamCatcher's Former 3D space RTS)
- O.R.B: Off-World Resource Base
