= Aura II: The Sacred Rings =

2007 video game

- Developer: Streko-Graphics Inc.
- Publisher: The Adventure Company
- Designer: Elizabeth Petzold
- Series: Aura
- Engine: In-house engine (3D spherical navigation)
- Platform: Microsoft Windows
- Release: May 4, 2007
- Genre: Adventure
- Mode: Single player

Aura II: The Sacred Rings is a 2007 adventure video game created by Canadian studio Streko-Graphics and published by The Adventure Company. It is the sequel to Aura: Fate of the Ages from 2004..

== Critical reception ==
The game has a Metacritic rating of 44% based on 18 critic reviews.
