= Riddle of the Sphinx: An Egyptian Adventure =

2000 video game

- Developer: Old World Studios
- Publisher: DreamCatcher Interactive
- Directors: Jeffrey S. Tobler; Karen E. Tobler
- Composer: Jeffrey S. Tobler
- Platforms: Windows, Mac OS
- Release: December 5, 2000; February 1, 2021 (remastered)
- Genre: Adventure
- Mode: Single-player

Riddle of the Sphinx: An Egyptian Adventure is a 2000 graphic adventure game developed by Old World Studios and published by DreamCatcher Interactive. It received a sequel, entitled The Omega Stone: Riddle of the Sphinx II, in 2003. A remastered version, Riddle of the Sphinx: Awakening, was released in 2021.

== Gameplay and plot ==
The gameplay is similar to any game in the post-Myst style, where players navigate through 360 panoramic screens and manipulate items to advance.

The game's plot is about a young archaeologist in Egypt who searches for a missing mentor, Sir Gil Blythe Geoffreys.

== Development ==
"The features, imperfections, and architecture have been replicated for total immersion. (The only recognizable elements we intentionally omitted are the graffiti currently defacing the Great Pyramid and most other monuments.)"

— Riddle of the Sphinx team on meticulousness of design.

The game took five years to make. The designers, Jeff & Karen Tobler, were enamored by the beauty and intricacy with which the Egyptians built their architecture, as well as the mysteries and secrets they held. The developers aimed to make the 3D models and renderings in the game as accurate as possible, for instance recreating the Sphinx and Sphinx Enclosure in exact detail. The team asked an expert to provide an authentic translation and editing of a scroll using the style and grammar used by the royal scribes during Chephren's reign They did extensive research into the history and culture of Egypt, and uploaded a lot of their research onto their website.

On the website, the team sold authentic Egyptian merchandise in association with A&E's Merchant Affiliation Program. Riddle of the Sphinx was modeled and rendered almost exclusively with Strata StudioPro, while CyberMesh exports were used for certain occasions. The game contains full-Screen, Interactive 360° Panoramas (QTVR). The game soundtrack was composed and performed entirely by Jeff Tobler.

The game was formally announced on June 10, 1998. In December 1999 it was announced the game would have a Spring 2000 release.

== Reception ==
=== Critical reviews ===
Reception

Aggregate score
| Aggregator | Score |
|---|---|
| Metacritic | 72/100 |

Review scores
| Publication | Score |
|---|---|
| Adventure Gamers | (2005) 4/5 (2001) 2/5 |
| AllGame | (Mac) 2/5 |
| Computer Games Strategy Plus | 4/5 |
| EP Daily | 7/10 |
| GameSpot | 7.4/10 |
| Gamezebo | 3.5/5 |
| GameZone | 7.5/10 |
| IGN | 5.3/10 |

The game received above-average reviews according to the review aggregation website Metacritic. IGN said, "Is this an oasis of adventure gaming in a barren desert of crap titles? Nah ... it's just a mirage."

=== Sales ===
Market research firm PC Data estimated North American retail sales of 4,955 units for the game during 2000, all of which derived from December. The firm reported another 99,429 retail sales of the game in North America during 2001, and 36,634 during the first six months of 2002. PC Data placed its total North American retail sales for 2003 at 16,747 units; during the first two months of 2004, its jewel case SKU sold 777 units and its original box SKU sold 1,537 units in the region. It ultimately sold in excess of 225,000 copies by March 2003.

=== Awards ===
The website won numerous awards, and the game's soundtrack was highly praised.

== Legacy ==
The Omega Stone: Riddle of the Sphinx II was released in 2003.

Riddle of the Sphinx, the second edition, has been continually available on Big Fish Games since 2004 as a download.

In 2015, a Kickstarter campaign was set up to have a 15th anniversary real-time 3D edition of the game, but the campaign was suspended early.

In 2017, The Old World Studios team, consisting of the original developers and new team members, successfully funded a second Kickstarter campaign. The goal was to release a remastered HD version on desktop and now mobile devices. The release was scheduled for December 2020. The game, titled Riddle of the Sphinx: Awakening, was eventually released on February 1, 2021. Adventure Gamers gave the remaster 4 out 5 stars in their review.

== See also ==
- Atlantis II
- The Crystal Key
- Traitors Gate
