= Obscure (video game) =

2004 video game

- North American PC cover art
- Developer: Hydravision Entertainment
- Publishers: EU: MC2-Microïds; NA: DreamCatcher Interactive
- Director: Desmond Oku
- Designer: Emmanuel Horrent
- Programmer: Lionel Fumery
- Artist: Anthony Lejeune
- Composer: Olivier Deriviere
- Engine: RenderWare
- Platforms: PlayStation 2; Windows; Xbox
- Release: AU: September 30, 2004; EU: October 1, 2004; NA: April 6, 2005
- Genre: Survival horror
- Modes: Single-player, multiplayer

Obscure (stylized as ObsCure) is a survival horror video game developed by Hydravision Entertainment and published by DreamCatcher Interactive in North America, Ubisoft in China and MC2-Microïds in other territories for Microsoft Windows, PlayStation 2 and Xbox. It was released on September 30, 2004, in Australia, October 1, 2004, in Europe, and on April 6, 2005 in North America.

== Synopsis ==
=== Characters and setting ===
Obscure follows five students of Leafmore High School as they investigate strange happenings, with players being able to control one at a time while the others are controlled by a computer or second player. The playable students are Josh Carter (voiced by Sam Riegel), a shy and reserved reporter for the school paper who can determine if there are unfinished tasks in an area; Stanley "Stan" Jones (voiced by Scott Haze); a drug addict, thief, and hacker as well as a friend of Josh and Kenny who can pick locks and break into rooms more easily than the other characters; varsity athlete Kenny Matthews (voiced by Liam O'Brien); Shannon Matthews (voiced by Stephanie Sheh), Kenny's intelligent younger sister who provides tips to solve puzzles more quickly, heal the others, and recover more health with normal health items; and Ashley Thompson (voiced by Tara Platt), Kenny's cheerleader girlfriend who is more proficient with weaponry than the others. While investigating Leafmore, the students encounter Principal Herbert Friedman, who kidnaps students to turn them into monsters; Dan, a student and one of his test subjects; school nurse and Friedman's accomplice Elisabeth Wickson; teacher Professor Walden; and Herbert's mutated twin brother and Elisabeth's husband Leonard.

=== Plot ===
Upon learning their friend Kenny has gone missing, Josh, Stan, Shannon, and Ashley set out to find him. However, their search leads to them being locked in Leafmore High overnight. While searching the campus, they are attacked by photosensitive monsters that can be weakened with flashlights and killed by direct sunlight. Meanwhile, Kenny encounters a fellow student named Dan. They attempt to escape together, but Dan is killed by one of the monsters.

The students eventually discover a conspiracy surrounding Principal Friedman, who has been kidnapping students and infecting them with spores derived from a rare African plant called Mortifilia under the belief that it will allow them to live forever. Additionally, they learn that Herbert and his accomplice Elisabeth are over 100 years old despite appearing in their 60s after successfully experimenting on each other. Along the way, the students become exposed to the spores while Herbert is killed by Professor Walden, who seeks to cure himself of his infection. Upon seeing this, Herbert's brother Leonard grows enraged, kills Walden, and mutates into a large, monstrous form, only to be defeated by the students. The group return to the gym to inject themselves with a cure. Though Leonard returns to attack them, they defeat him once more and leave him to die in the sunlight.

== Gameplay ==
Obscure has a two-player cooperative mode that allows the player to complete the campaign with a friend. The game also allows players to combine items, for example taping a flashlight to any firearm.

While each character has special abilities, none of them are necessary to complete the game. Each character can perform the same physical acts even if it takes some characters longer and/or more effort than others. If any characters die during the adventure, the player may simply continue with those remaining.

== Reception ==
Reception

Aggregate score
Aggregator	Score		
Aggregator	PC	PS2	Xbox
Metacritic	63/100	65/100	66/100

Review scores
Publication	Score		
Publication	PC	PS2	Xbox
Eurogamer	N/A	N/A	7/10
Game Informer	N/A	6/10	6/10
GameSpot	6.1/10	6.4/10	6.4/10
GameSpy	N/A	3/5	3/5
GameZone	6.7/10	6/10	6.7/10
IGN	N/A	7.6/10	7.6/10
Official U.S. PlayStation Magazine	N/A	2/5	N/A
Official Xbox Magazine (US)	N/A	N/A	5.5/10
PC Gamer (US)	78%	N/A	N/A
Detroit Free Press	N/A	2/4	N/A
The Sydney Morning Herald	3.5/5	3.5/5	3.5/5

The game received "mixed or average reviews" on all platforms according to the review aggregation website Metacritic.

== Sequels and future ==
Obscure II takes place two years later. The kids who survived are now at college living normal lives. They discover a strange plant on campus and things start going awry. The game was released for Microsoft Windows, PlayStation 2, Wii and PlayStation Portable. The franchise was abruptly halted due to the closure of Hydravision Entertainment, who had intended to do a sequel and possibly a prequel.

A third entry was announced in 2011. However, the following year, its developer, Hydravision Entertainment closed. While a group of developers formed a new company, Mighty Rocket Studio, decided to continue work on the game, the change of direction to more non-horror action-oriented gameplay caused them rename the game to Final Exam (2013).

In 2014, a high definition remaster of Obscure and its sequel was re-released on Steam featuring Steam achievements, leaderboards and community support. This version of Obscure removed music from Sum 41 due to the rights being lost.
