= Outcry (video game) =

2008 video game

- Developer: Phantomery Interactive
- Engine: Panopticum
- Platform: Microsoft Windows
- Release: NA: August 26, 2008
- Genre: Point-and-click adventure

Outcry (known as Outcry: The Dawn in Europe and Sublustrum (Russian: Сублю́струм) in Russia) is a first person psychological thriller point-and-click adventure video game developed by Phantomery Interactive, released for the PC by Noviy Disk May 22, 2008 in Russia, and by The Adventure Company September 3 in the US.

A remake is in development by the original team with the name Sublustrum using a modern engine with a release date of fall 2026. It will feature multiple endings as well as new puzzles and voice overs. The trailer for the game was released on the official Phantomery Interactive channel on YouTube on November 27, 2025.

== Story ==
The main protagonist receives a letter from his brother, a scientist, who invites him to his home so that he can show the results of his project, and get some ideas for the next book. Once arriving he finds that his brother has mysteriously vanished, leaving all his material possessions to him - including a large, strange machine and a message telling him not to reproduce his experiments.

Disregarding brother's warning, he starts looking for clues that will help him to find his missing brother. He discovers that the machine he has created is an instrument for making a person disconnect the mind from the body. Recreating the experiment as best as he can, he travels to a surreal, dream like place his brother calls The Shimmering World to save him.

== Gameplay ==
The game is played through the eyes of the main character, in first person perspective with a 360 degree panoramic view and point and click interface. Controls are set up to be as easy to use as possible. Clicking the left mouse button will move the main character to the next area, pick up items, read books and notes, etc. On the other hand, right clicking will bring up a list of notes and books that players already read, a list of items that they can carry, and a button for showing the menu.

Throughout the game the players will encounter several puzzles that must be solved by searching for clues in journals and other writings, listening to sounds, traveling back in time, or by pure logic.

== Reception ==
The game has received very mixed reviews, from lowest grade to top marks. The average sits a bit above average, however, with 61.77% from GameRankings, and 63/100 from Metacritic.
