= Castleween =

2002 video game

- European PS2 cover art
- Developer: Wanadoo Edition (Note: The Game Boy Advance version was developed by Magic Pockets.)
- Publishers: EU: Wanadoo Edition; NA: DreamCatcher Interactive; JP: MTO
- Platforms: PlayStation 2, GameCube, Game Boy Advance
- Release: PlayStation 2: EU: November 27, 2002; JP: June 19, 2003; GameCube: EU: May 30, 2003; JP: June 19, 2003; NA: September 29, 2003; Game Boy Advance: JP: April 24, 2003; EU: May 30, 2003; NA: October 31, 2003
- Genre: Platform
- Modes: Single-player, multiplayer

Castleween (known as Spirits & Spells in North America) is a 2002 platform video game developed and published by Wanadoo Edition for the PlayStation 2, before being ported to the GameCube. A separate version developed by Magic Pockets was released for the Game Boy Advance.

== Plot ==
Alicia and Greg set off with their friends one Halloween night to look for a house in the forest where they could stock up on goodies. Upon reaching the house, Greg and Alicia's friends are turned into stone by a bogeyman. To save their friends, the two heroes must enter the world of the dead. In order to find their friends and set them free, they need to make it through cemeteries, haunted houses and sinister laboratories. Only one person at a time is allowed to enter the world of the dead, so Alicia and Greg must take turns to make their way through the danger that awaits them. Friends like the Goblin and Jack O'Lantern will teach them magic tricks that will help them to overcome obstacles along the way. They must find the Mad Scientist's laboratory to get their friends home safe and sound.

== Characters ==
- Alicia - a redheaded, blue-eyed little girl, dressed up as a witch for Halloween. She might seem quiet and polite at first, but she can be very mischievous and dynamic. She has got quite a personality.
- Greg - a rather hard-headed boy. He is dressed as a devil for Halloween. He hates school, authority, and anything that isn't playing with his friends. He is quite wild and rowdy, and he tends to break everything in his path - this kid is a little monster.

== Development ==
Wanadoo Edition announced the game in December 2001 under the name of Halloween, with Kalisto Entertainment handling development of the project. The PlayStation 2 version was planned for a December 2002 release, while the GameCube and Game Boy Advance versions would be released in 2003. Kalisto previously entered into a publishing deal with Wanadoo earlier in the year.

During the game's development, Kalisto Entertainment filed for bankruptcy. This led to the project being put on limbo, which would lead to Wanadoo Edition hiring most of the development team to continue the project in-house, and as such, Kalisto is not credited in the final product.

In June 2002, DreamCatcher Interactive announced that they had entered into a publishing deal that would allow them to publish six of Wanadoo's titles in North America, including Castleween, which would be renamed to Spirits & Spells. The game was planned for a Winter 2003 release, and it would be a GameCube console exclusive over there. It was DreamCatcher's first title for the system.

== Reception ==
Reception

Aggregate score
Aggregator	Score		
Aggregator	GBA	GameCube	PS2
Metacritic	64/100	50/100	N/A

Review scores
Publication	Score		
Publication	GBA	GameCube	PS2
Famitsu	N/A	20/40	20/40
Game Informer	N/A	2/10	N/A
GameZone	N/A	6.5/10	N/A
IGN	N/A	5/10	N/A
Jeuxvideo.com	14/20	11/20	11/20
Nintendo Power	3.6/5	2.8/5	N/A

The Game Boy Advance and GameCube versions received "mixed" reviews according to the review aggregation website Metacritic. In Japan, where the GBA version was ported and published by MTO on April 24, 2003, as Mahō no Pumpkin: Anne to Greg no Daibōken (魔法のパンプキン 〜アンとグレッグの大冒険〜, Mahō no Pankin 〜An to Gureggu no Daibōken〜; lit. "The Magic Pumpkin: Anne and Greg's Great Adventure"), followed by the GameCube and PlayStation 2 ports on June 19, 2003, Famitsu gave the latter two console versions a score of 20 out of 40 each. Nintendo Power gave the GBA version an average review, over two months before it was released Stateside.
