= Enigma: Rising Tide =

2003 video game

- Developer: Tesseraction Games
- Publishers: NA: Dreamcatcher Interactive; EU: GMX Media
- Producer: Kelly Asay
- Designers: Kelly Asay, Blake Hutchins, Alex Jiminez
- Platform: Windows
- Release: August 25, 2003
- Genre: Vehicle simulation game
- Mode: Single-player

Enigma: Rising Tide is a naval vehicle simulation developed by American studio Tesseraction Games and published by Dreamcatcher Interactive. It was released for Windows in August 2003. Enigma is an alternate history game that takes place in the World War II era. The final release of Enigma: Rising Tide was version v2.1.3a dated February 2004.

== Story ==
The story of Enigma: Rising Tide is centered on the United States and Germany and the escalating tensions between the two. After a number of conflicts between destroyer groups in the Caribbean Sea, the two powers come to the brink of war with the sinking of the merchant ship SS Samuel Wren off of Ireland in mid-1937. It was claimed that the ship was sunk without warning by a German U-boat, which had surfaced to search the ship for illegal arms. Shortly thereafter, Prince Edward's task force is attacked just south of England as it attempts to head for the Falkland Islands to engage the LFN warships there. In the engagement, Prince Edward is sunk, while Hood escapes with moderate damage.

After the attack by Hood, a task force with Kaiser Wilhelm as its flagship sets out to pursue the escaping British, but it is intercepted by a large American destroyer force which delays the Germans long enough for Hood to escape. However, intelligence later reveals that Hood's task force was engaged by the Americans, and that it did not escape unscathed.

Chapter 1 of Enigma ends with a cutscene that reveals the Americans have launched a large-scale attack on the German fleet at Scapa Flow, effectively neutralizing the battleships stationed there. Richthofen declares the age of the battleship is over, and that Germany shall build aircraft carriers and aircraft. The epilogue closes with his orders to convert the battleships Bismarck and Tirpitz, still being outfitted at Kiel, to be able to carry planes. The epilogue ends with some photos of Bismarck under construction, near completion, and then after conversion to a brand-new class of warship, a battlecarrier. In the final photo, she has a large flight deck across the aft section of the ship, but still bears her two forward gun turrets.

== Gold Edition ==
Enigma: Rising Tide also has a Gold Edition version which was released in 2005.
