= Keepsake (video game) =

2006 video game

- Developer(s): Wicked Studios
- Publisher(s): The Adventure Company
- Engine: Crystal Space
- Platform(s): Windows
- Release: NA: March 29, 2006
- Genre(s): Adventure
- Mode(s): Single-player

Keepsake is a third person point-and-click adventure game developed by Canadian company Wicked Studios for Linux, Mac OS X and Windows platforms. The player plays as the main character Lydia. The quest starts that Lydia investigates what happened to Dragonvale Academy as she was on her way to meet a friend there, as she arrived she noticed that the academy was deserted. Although the game was met with mixed reviews, the developers endeavour to improve the game by releasing patches.

== Plot ==
Lydia, the main character, has just arrived at Dragonvale Academy, a school of magic. Her best friend, Celeste, agreed to meet her outside the school at a nearby fountain, but when Lydia arrives, the school is deserted and Celeste is nowhere to be found. With the help of a wolf (who claims to be both a dragon and a familiar to a powerful mage) named Zak, Lydia sets out to find out what happened at Dragonvale Academy that caused the disappearance of hundreds of people and to reunite with her best friend.

== Gameplay ==
Keepsake is a third person point-and-click adventure game in which the user clicks areas on the screen to navigate and explore the world. The world is set up through fixed camera angles showing the portion of the area that the main character, Lydia, stands in. The user can click different locations and items to move, activate puzzles or cutscenes, and enter other areas. The game is played through exploring the world and solving puzzles to advance. The total gameplay length is estimated at 15 hours.

== Development and release ==
The engine behind Keepsake is called Glyph. It is mostly built on open source projects. The developers stated that the main reason for that was the cross-platform issue. The game 3D engine is Crystal Space; it works on Linux, Mac OS X and Windows. The sound engine uses DirectSound3D, but it can also support OpenAL for cross-platform.

The game was first released in Germany by Frogster Interactive on November 19, 2005, and in France by Micro Application on February 17, 2006. The game was also released in various other European territories by Lighthouse Interactive on February 24 with English, Dutch, and Italian localizations, followed later by Polish, Spanish, and Russian ones. The game shipped in North America on March 29, 2006.

A patch was released for the European version which added a map of the Academy to be displayed from the game control console. The map was purely for display; the player could not use it for quick navigation to a room as in Simon the Sorcerer.

== Reception ==
The game received mixed reviews. The game received a score of 5.2 out of 10 from GameSpot, who commented on the game's lackluster plot but interesting puzzles. IGN gave the game a 7.2 rating out of 10, noting the second half of the game featured "impossibly difficult" puzzles to solve. Currently the game has accumulated a 68% rating on Metacritic and 70% on GameRankings.
