= EXperience112 =

2007 video game

eXperience112 (The Experiment)
- Developer(s): Lexis Numérique
- Publisher(s): FRA: Micro Application; NA: The Adventure Company
- Director(s): Éric Viennot
- Designer(s): Nicolas Delaye
- Artist(s): Nicolas Delaye
- Platform(s): Windows
- Release: FRA: October 11, 2007; NA: February 15, 2008
- Genre(s): Adventure
- Mode(s): Single-player

EXperience112 (styled "eXperience112" and renamed The Experiment in North America, New Zealand, and Australia) is an adventure game created by French studio Lexis Numérique and published by Micro Application in 2007 for the Microsoft Windows platform. In the game, the player does not directly control the avatar; instead, the player helps to guide the avatar via a system of cameras and remotely controlled equipment as a person sitting in front of a computer.

== Gameplay ==
With the use of a sophisticated security system, the player helps the main character, Lea Nichols, by telling her where to go, turning lights on and off, opening doors, entering codes, controlling helper robots, and reading the torrent of files, email, and codes you are given. Only some emails contain helpful information, and only some cameras are useful. Some have fallen objects that obscure the view or are otherwise non-functional. The game keeps a log of real-world play time with Lea, noting how many days long you've kept her waiting since last playing.

== Plot ==
The setting is a derelict ship stranded on a beach in the middle of the ocean. The anonymous player is mysteriously locked in the operations room with doctor Lea Nichols, the only survivor of said ship.

The player first finds Lea Nichols through the camera lens when she wakes up from her room. After a brief introduction, she is reluctant to trust the player with valuable information (such as the login details to her computer account). However, since the player is the only person still alive beside her, she must rely on them for survival. During an exploration with Nichols on the ship, she finds the remains of her old colleagues and occasionally recollects some memory fragments of an experiment subject called "112".

== Development and release ==
EXperience 112 was released in France by publisher Micro Application on October 11, 2007. The game was released in North America by The Adventure Company on February 15, 2008. In North America, Lea's appearance on the box art was changed considerably, but her in-game appearance was unaltered.

== Reception ==
Reception

Aggregate score
Aggregator	Score
Metacritic	68/100

Review scores
Publication	Score
GameSpot	7.5/10
GamesRadar+	7/10
Hyper	80/100

EXperience112 was met with mixed or average reviews, according to review aggregator Metacritic.

GamingShogun called the game a "very rewarding and challenging adventure/puzzle game which manages to create a hodgepodge of voyeurism, lateral thinking, and atmosphere that will surely give you the willies if played by yourself in a dark room". Brett Todd of GameSpot said that the title "overcomes its clichéd beginnings with original gameplay." Hyper said the "videogame postmodernism" style of voyeuristic play creates, "a truly bizarre feeling...rather than working against it, it contributes to its success."

== See also ==
- Lifeline
- République
