= Dead Reefs =

2007 video game

- Developer: Streko-Graphics
- Publisher: The Adventure Company
- Platform: Windows
- Release: NA: July 3, 2007; EU: June 29, 2007
- Genre: Adventure
- Mode: Single-player

Dead Reefs is a game, developed by Canadian studio Streko-Graphics and published by The Adventure Company.

The investigative adventure that takes place on the island of Dead Reefs off the coast of England, infamous for the wicked pirate inhabitants and a frightful curse.

== Plot ==
It is said that for hundreds of years, pirates from the English island of Dead Reefs were looting the ships sailing by and slaughtering their crews. One of the wrecked ships was carrying an old relic, kept secret and locked by a centennial monk order. It is known to have been then stolen and retrieved by the ruler of the island, Baron DeSantra.

Shortly after, inhabitants of the island started dying in unnatural ways one by one. The first victim of this strange series of events was the Baron's wife, who was killed by her husband with his sword.

Ten decades after these alleged "facts", a new death is reminiscent of the legend and casts fear on the island of Dead Reefs. A detective from the mainland, Amadeo Finvinerro, is sent to investigate the death and find the killer.

== Production ==
The island of Dead Reefs is not based on some pre-existing island in real life. Streko-Graphics handled all the scripts and voice recordings, whereas the publisher recruited the voice actors of the roles. The game was written using the Virtools 3D platform. Evgeniy Lebed was the lead developer. The game had 16 characters, over 40 minutes of high-quality cuts and atmospheric music.

A demo was released 20 July 2007, and premiered at E3. The game was first published by DreamCatcher in the United States, and afterwards by New Disk in Russia. Atari France distributed the games in France. A fan-made Czech localisation of the game was made in 2008.

The game was included in a 2014 Humble Bundle.

Streko-Graphics would retroactively say that game had a subpar management, which they only realised late in the production process. It puts this down to the game having a less favourable reception than anticipated. The game had a planned release on Xbox, but the team did not realise how much work it would take to make a separate version of their game.

== Reception ==
Streko-Graphics believes that the game had a "mediocre" reception in the West and in Russia.

Reception

Review scores
Publication	Score
4Players	61/100
Adventure Gamers	2/5
GameSpot	5.5/10
GameZone	5.5/10
IGN	4/10
Jeuxvideo.com	13/20
Just Adventure	C+
GamerNode	5.2/10
GameWorld	50%
