= The Adventure Company =

Canadian video game developer

- Type: Division
- Industry: Video games
- Founded: 2002
- Defunct: 2011; 15 years ago
- Fate: Parent and the company dissolved, brand still used as distribution label by THQ Nordic
- Headquarters: Toronto, Ontario, Canada
- Parent: DreamCatcher Interactive (JoWooD Entertainment)

The Adventure Company was a Canadian video game developer and a former publishing division of DreamCatcher Interactive. It was sold to THQ Nordic GmbH in 2011 following DreamCatcher's parent (JoWooD Entertainment) assets being sold after entering administration.

== History ==
The Adventure Company was first launched in January 2002 as a division and brand of DreamCatcher Interactive to distribute its adventure games titles under. The first title released under the new brand was The Cameron Files: Secret at Loch Ness which was released at the end of January 2002. The Adventure Company has worked with many developers including: Kheops Studio, THQ, Microïds, and Cryo Interactive. In 2006, DreamCatcher Interactive became a wholly owned subsidiary of the Austrian video game publisher JoWooD Entertainment.

In 2011, Nordic Games acquired JoWooD, its products and brands and some of the companies' subsidiaries. Following the acquisition JoWood and the Adventure Company became publishing labels for Nordic Games, a wholly owned subsidiary of Nordic Games Holding.

== Published games ==
Note: This list is for titles which The Adventure Company published. Re-releases of DreamCatcher Interactive games nor Nordic Games titles under The Adventure Company are not included.

Title	Platform(s)	Release date	Developer(s)
The Cameron Files: Secret at Loch Ness	Microsoft Windows	November 2001	Galiléa
Arthur's Knights II: The Secret of Merlin	Microsoft Windows	May 6, 2002	Cryo Interactive
The Mystery of the Nautilus	Microsoft Windows	May 9, 2002	T-bot Interactive
Auryn Quest	Microsoft Windows	June 12, 2002	Discreet Monsters
Syberia	Microsoft Windows	September 10, 2002	Microïds Canada
The Cameron Files: Pharaoh's Curse	Microsoft Windows	November 1, 2002	Galiléa
The Mystery of the Mummy	Microsoft Windows	January 22, 2003	Frogwares
The Omega Stone: Riddle of the Sphinx II	Microsoft Windows	March 18, 2003	Omni Creative
Curse of Atlantis: Thorgal's Quest	Microsoft Windows	May 21, 2003	Cryo Interactive
Dark Fall: The Journal	Microsoft Windows	July 23, 2003	XXV Productions
The Black Mirror	Microsoft Windows	October 10, 2003	Future Games / Unknown Identity
Traitors Gate 2: Cypher	Microsoft Windows	October 28, 2003	258 Productions / Data Ductus Games
Broken Sword: The Sleeping Dragon	Microsoft Windows	November 17, 2003	Revolution Software / Six by Nine / Sumo Digital (Sheffield)
Mysterious Journey II: Chameleon	Microsoft Windows	November 24, 2003	Detalion
Broken Sword: The Sleeping Dragon	Xbox	December 2, 2003	Revolution Software / Six by Nine / Sumo Digital (Sheffield)
Law & Order II: Double or Nothing	Microsoft Windows	December 31, 2003	Legacy Interactive
Jack the Ripper	Microsoft Windows	January 29, 2004	Galiléa
The Omega Stone: Riddle of the Sphinx II	Mac OS	March 9, 2004	TransGaming
Crystal Key 2: The Far Realm	Microsoft Windows	March 17, 2004	Earthlight Productions / Kheops
The Egyptian Prophecy	Microsoft Windows	March 29, 2004	Kheops Studio
Forever Worlds: Enter the Unknown	Microsoft Windows	April 5, 2004	Hexagon Entertainment
Aura: Fate of the Ages	Microsoft Windows	June 24, 2004	Streko-Graphics
Missing: Since January	Microsoft Windows	June 29, 2004	Lexis Numérique
Lights Out	Microsoft Windows	August 26, 2004	XXV Productions
Wanted: A Wild Western Adventure	Microsoft Windows	October 3, 2004	Revistronic
Atlantis: Evolution	Microsoft Windows	October 15, 2004	Atlantis Interactive
Return to Mysterious Island	Microsoft Windows	November 4, 2004	Kheops Studio
Sentinel: Descendants in Time	Microsoft Windows	December 14, 2004	Detalion
The Moment of Silence	Microsoft Windows	February 25, 2005	House of Tales
Still Life	Microsoft Windows	April 16, 2005	Microïds Canada
Still Life	Xbox	June 6, 2005	Microïds Canada
ECHO: Secrets of the Lost Cavern	Microsoft Windows	July 5, 2005	Kheops Studio
Voyage	Microsoft Windows	August 16, 2005	Kheops Studio
NiBiRu: Age of Secrets	Microsoft Windows	August 31, 2005	Future Games / DTP Entertainment
Missing: The 13th Victim	Microsoft Windows	October 14, 2005	Lexis Numérique
Agatha Christie: And Then There Were None	Microsoft Windows	October 30, 2005	AWE Productions
Crime Stories: From the Files of Martin Mystère	Microsoft Windows	March 23, 2006	Artematica Entertainment
Keepsake	Microsoft Windows	March 29, 2006	Wicked Studios
Safecracker: The Ultimate Puzzle Adventure	Microsoft Windows	August 2, 2006	Kheops Studio
Evidence: The Last Ritual	Microsoft Windows	October 17, 2006	Lexis Numérique
Secret Files: Tunguska	Microsoft Windows	October 31, 2006	Fusionsphere Systems / Animation Arts
Agatha Christie: Murder on the Orient Express	Microsoft Windows	November 14, 2006	AWE Productions
Secrets of the Ark: A Broken Sword Game	Microsoft Windows	February 13, 2007	Revolution Software / Sumo Digital (Sheffield)
The Ugly Prince Duckling	Microsoft Windows	March 13, 2007	Guppyworks
Aura II: The Sacred Rings	Microsoft Windows	May 4, 2007	Streko-Graphics
The Secrets of Atlantis	Microsoft Windows	May 29, 2007	Atlantis Interactive
Dead Reefs	Microsoft Windows	July 3, 2007	Streko-Graphics
Sam & Max: Season One	Microsoft Windows	August 7, 2007	Telltale Games
Agatha Christie: Evil Under the Sun	Microsoft Windows	October 15, 2007	AWE Productions
Next Life	Microsoft Windows	November 16, 2007	Future Games
The Experiment	Microsoft Windows	February 5, 2008	Lexis Numérique
Agatha Christie: And Then There Were None	Wii	February 26, 2008	AWE Productions
Cleopatra: Riddle of the Tomb	Microsoft Windows	March 31, 2008	Kheops Studio
Sherlock Holmes: Nemesis	Microsoft Windows	April 8, 2008	Frogwares
Dracula: Origin	Microsoft Windows	June 2, 2008	Frogwares
Murder in the Abbey	Microsoft Windows	August 25, 2008	Alcachofa Soft
Outcry	Microsoft Windows	August 28, 2008	Phantomery Interactive
Everlight: Of Magic & Power	Microsoft Windows	September 30, 2008	Silver Style Entertainment
The Hardy Boys: The Hidden Theft	Microsoft Windows	September 30, 2008	XPEC Entertainment
Sam & Max: Season One	Wii	October 14, 2008	Telltale Games
Agatha Christie: Evil Under the Sun	Wii	December 2, 2008	AWE Productions
Sherlock Holmes vs. Jack the Ripper	Microsoft Windows	May 12, 2009	Frogwares
The Mystery of the Mummy	Nintendo DS	July 14, 2009	Mistic Software
The Hardy Boys: The Perfect Crime	Microsoft Windows	July 2009	Trine Games
The Hardy Boys: The Hidden Theft	Wii	September 29, 2009	XPEC Entertainment
Agatha Christie: The ABC Murders	Nintendo DS	November 2009	Black Lantern Studios
Safecracker: The Ultimate Puzzle Adventure	Nintendo DS	December 2009	Firehazard Studio
Sherlock Holmes vs. Jack the Ripper	Xbox 360	April 23, 2010	Spiders
