= Chaser (video game) =

2003 video game

- Developer: Cauldron
- Publisher: EU:JoWooD Productions NA:Encore, Inc.
- Composers: Juraj Karkuš; Ľubomír Ruttkay
- Engine: CloakNT
- Platform: Windows
- Release: UK: June 20, 2003; EU: June 27, 2003; NA: August 19, 2003
- Genre: First-person shooter
- Modes: Single-player, multiplayer

Chaser is a first-person shooter developed by Cauldron for Microsoft Windows. It was published in 2003, then re-released on Steam and GOG.com in 2011. The game was developed in Slovakia.

== Plot ==
The game takes place in the future, when humanity has colonized Mars. A coalition of 36 top industrial corporations establish the MARSCORP consortium in 2036 with the goal of terraforming the planet. In 2042, MARSCORP has become the de facto autocratic government of Mars, with its director Samuel Longwood being a ruthless dictator. Meanwhile, Graham Castor's highly elusive rebels seek to liberate Mars.

The game's protagonist wakes up in the medical bay of the space station HMS Majestic, which is under attack by unknown assailants looking for him. Having recovered a gun, he fights his way to an escape pod and flees, moments before the station explodes. The escape pod crashlands into the fictional city of Montack somewhere in the United States, where the news of the Majestic massacre has preceded him. According to the television, he is a notorious Martian rebel called John Chaser.

A wanted man, he is recruited into the Vallero crime family, which is at war with the local Yakuza chapter. The family implants a small remote-controlled bomb into each of its members to ensure their loyalty. As such, on the eve of an attack on Yakuza headquarters (Hotel Nippon), Chaser secretly visits a Japanese hacker in the Yakuza-controlled part of the city to remove the bomb. While receiving weapons and ammo, Chaser hides the bomb inside Vallero's limousine. Shortly afterwards, Vallero learns of Chaser's unauthorized foray into Yakuza territory and detonates the bomb, killing himself. Chaser disappears after killing all of Vallero's men, the Yakuza leaders and scores of Yakuza gunmen.

By this time, Chaser has had recovered a few vague fragments of his memory: On Mars, a vehicle full of armed men led by the fearsome Scott Stone attack the building where Chaser was, gunning him down and taking away his body.

Chaser contacts Kabir, a smuggler who promises transit to Mars in exchange for Chaser escorting Kabir's contraband to Siberia. There, Kabir betrays Chaser and shoots him several times. According to an elderly eyewitness, just as Kabir was about to finish Chaser, an armed man in black scared him and his men away and injected Chaser with medicine. Having recovered, Chaser attacks a local labor camp and rescues a man who can lead him to Kabir's base of operations, an old spaceport. After killing Kabir and his men, Chaser departs to Mars.

On Mars, Chaser is thrown in prison, where he meets one of his old comrades. They orchestrate an escape plan which, unbeknown to them, is seen and heard by Longwood himself. Once they escape the prison, they make contact with one of the rebels who informs them that Longwood has been rerouting terraforming money into his own projects, including illegal human cloning and memory transfer. They orchestrate a plan of assassination in which they blow up a train carrying Longwood.

With Longwood officially announced dead, the rebels return to their base to celebrate, only to be attacked by Longwood's forces. After an extended gunfight, the base is overrun and both Chaser and Castor are captured. Longwood, alive and well, reveals that the protagonist is, in fact, Scott Stone. The real John Chaser died before he could be interrogated. Aboard the Majestic, Stone assumed Chaser's appearance through plastic surgery. Castor's men, however, attacked the Majestic and disrupted the memory transfer process, leaving him an amnesiac. Castor admits to being responsible for the attack, but vehemently denies all else and pleads with the protagonist not to join Longwood.

Eventually, the protagonist shoots Castor dead. Even though the prospect of interrogating him is gone, Longwood is pleased. He has his men shoot the protagonist and drag his barely alive body away.

== Multiplayer ==
There are 12 maps and 4 game modes:

- Shock Troops: two opposing teams have at it, the "Government Forces" vs. the "Law Breakers". Objectives vary from eliminating all opponents and stealing important objects to defusing missiles. Each player can gain rank points to obtain higher ranks in order to earn more money for a wide variety of weapons.
- Deathmatch: a free for all with an optional time limit and frag limit.
- Team Deathmatch: a continuous battle between two teams, players respawn immediately after being killed. A time limit and frag limit are optional.
- Capture the Flag: two opposing teams must try and capture each other's flag and bring it to their own base to score points. Players respawn throughout the battle after being killed.

== Reception ==
Reception

Aggregate score
Aggregator	Score
Metacritic	66/100

Review scores
Publication	Score
AllGame	3/5
Computer Games Magazine	2/5
Computer Gaming World	2/5
Eurogamer	7/10
GameSpot	8/10
GameSpy	3/5
GameZone	7.9/10
IGN	7.5/10
PC Gamer (US)	69%
X-Play	2/5

The game received "average" reviews according to the review aggregation website Metacritic. Scott Osborne of GameSpot said that the game offers "loads of thrilling, old school shooter action".
