= Aztec: The Curse in the Heart of the City of Gold =

1999 video game

- Developers: Cryo Interactive; Tek 5 (PS1)
- Publishers: EU: Cryo Interactive; NA: DreamCatcher Interactive; WW: Microids (iOS)
- Director: Luc Lefebvre
- Designer: Romane Sarfati
- Platforms: Windows, PlayStation, iOS
- Release: EU: November 1999; NA: April 2000; EU: September 2000 (PS1); WW: September 2012 (iOS)
- Genre: Adventure
- Mode: Single-player

Aztec: The Curse in the Heart of the City of Gold (French: Aztec: Malédiction au cœur de la cité d'or, also known as The Sacred Amulet in North America) is a 1999 adventure game designed for Windows, PlayStation and iOS. It was developed by and published by Cryo Interactive (ported to the PS1 by Tek 5) and licensed by Wanadoo Edition.

== Plot ==
A young Aztec huntsman from the village of Atoyac (near Tenochtitlan), named "Little Serpent", is out hunting when he sees a nobleman, mortally wounded by the otomi warrior "Mountain Head". The dying nobleman gives him an ornate necklace and utters the name Tlatli. Little Serpent is accused of the murder. After learning that his parents have been taken away and the land is affected by a strange disease, Little Serpent searches for the poet in Tlatelolco. With Mountain Head in pursuit, he infiltrates Moctezuma's palace. He has a limited time to find the nature of the disease before his parents are sacrificed. Finding a link to several necklaces, Little Serpent enters the temple of the Ceremonial Center, where a nobleman and priestess are shown to be responsible for the disease, trying to overthrow the emperor. The leader of this cult is "Black Flower", who eventually forces Little Serpent to poison the water or drink the poison himself. He escapes and eventually makes his way back to his village. He is arrested and about to be sacrificed, but is saved thanks to a bracelet he got from a beggar. Little Serpent and his family are given an official pardon and Little Serpent himself becomes a nobleman.

== Reception ==
Reception

Aggregate score
Aggregator	Score
GameRankings	68%

Review score
Publication	Score
Jeuxvideo.com	17/20
