= Beyond Time =

1997 video game

- Developers: Jones and Jones Multimedia
- Publisher: DreamCatcher Interactive
- Release: November 1997
- Genre: Adventure
- Mode: Single-player

Beyond Time a.k.a. Shadow of the Obelisk: Delve Into the Corridors of Time is a 1997 full motion video adventure game developed by Jones and Jones Multimedia and published by DreamCatcher Interactive.

== Development ==
The background of Jones and Jones Multimedia employees included theatre, fiction, literature, and art, and the company's video game output (including this game) combined these aspects together. They aimed to include genuine art and historical information to make it appealing and long-lasting. They set the game in locations that had an air of mystery and fascination. The team spent more than a year doing art history research to have a better understanding of the architectural worlds which were being created in the game. They turned their research into 3D representations; while they didn't recreate existing structures, they incorporated elements that they observed. The team aimed to add 2D animation and sound effects to as many screens as possible to give a sense of a lived-in world, for instance a bird flying across the sky. A unique game engine was made for the title.

== Critical reception ==
Reception

Review score
Publication	Score
PC Games	F

Quandary thought the game's short length let it down. Just Adventure and Adventure Gamers described the game as a watered-down Timelapse-type experience. Game Revolution thought the graphics were underwhelming. Adventure Classic Gaming criticised the game's "plodding, chatty, confused storyline". Computer Gaming World said it "wants to be Myst" and fails at it. PC PowerPlay deemed the game a "dry, humorless, dull, and pretty monotonous" Myst-clone. It received a score of 78 from FamilyPC.

=== Awards and nominations ===
The game was the Runner-up for the "Coaster of the Year" award in the April 1999 issue of Computer Gaming World.
