= Réunion des musées nationaux et du Grand Palais des Champs-Élysées =

French cultural umbrella organisation

Coordinates: 48.8479°N 2.3682°E

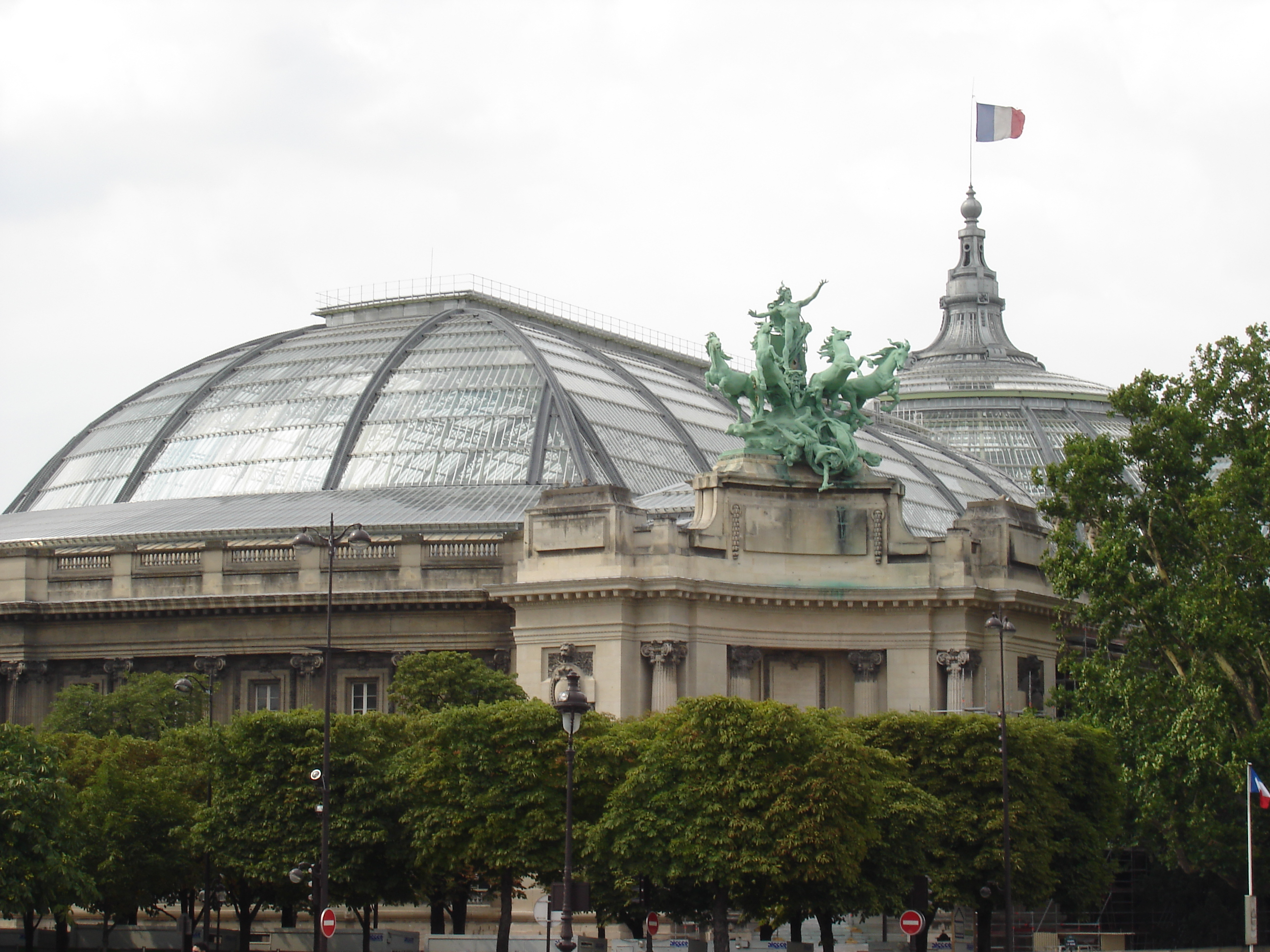
Grand Palais

The Réunion des musées nationaux et du Grand Palais des Champs-Élysées (French pronunciation: [ʁeynjɔ̃ de myze nɑsjɔno e dy ɡʁɑ̃ palɛ de ʃɑ̃z‿elize]; abbr. Rmn-GP) is a French cultural umbrella organisation, an établissement public à caractère industriel et commercial (EPIC), formed in 2011, through the merger of the Paris National Museums and the Grand Palais.

Its genesis came about in 1896, under the leadership of the French statesmen Raymond Poincaré and Georges Leygues, with the aim of purchasing works of art for national collections. The institution has three current directives: the welcoming of the public, the organizing of temporary exhibitions, and the holding of exhibitions and its permanent collections.

On 1 January 2011 the Réunion des Musées Nationaux merged with the public establishment of the Grand Palais des Champs-Élysées, which had been created in 2007. The new public institution is now governed by decree no 2011-52 of 13 January 2011.

The Rmn-GP is responsible for 34 national museums. Two statutes exist for these national museums; most are also public institutions with legal and financial autonomy. The others are services with national jurisdiction (SCN), attached to the Museums Department of France (SMF).
