= Jewels of the Oracle =

1995 video game

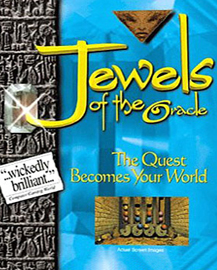
- Box art for second edition
- Developer: ELOI Productions
- Publisher: Discis Knowledge Research Inc.
- Platforms: Macintosh, PlayStation, Sega Saturn, and Windows
- Release: 1995
- Genre: Point-and-click adventure
- Mode: Single-player

Jewels of the Oracle is a 1995 adventure game developed by ELOI Productions and published by Discis Knowledge Research Inc. It was released on Macintosh, PlayStation, Sega Saturn, and Windows. A sequel developed by Bardworks and published by Hoffman and Associates was released in 1998 entitled Jewels II: The Ultimate Challenge.

== Production ==
A demo was released which contained three puzzles and a movie-like trailer. In addition, a free version with a single puzzle was made available for a limited time by CompuServe and America Online.

== Gameplay ==
The stationary puzzle game contains 24 puzzles, and lacks a storyline or plot. The design is Egyptian/Mesopotamian, and as such an Oracle provides hints to the player. New Straits Times wrote that the game mixes the gameplay concepts from Myst with the graphics of The 7th Guest. Similarly, Techtite deemed it a Myst-clone due to having the search-and-discover mechanics, while having the puzzles of The 7th Guest. The journal article "Adventure games, permutations, and spreadsheets" explains that both Jewels and Guest incorporate puzzles into their design. The Washington Post also made a favorable comparison between the two games.

== Critical reception ==
=== Jewels of the Oracle ===
Reception

Review scores
Publication	Score
Next Generation	1/5
MacUser	4/5
Computer Game Review	85/88/82
PC Magazine	4/4
Electronic Entertainment	C

Jewels of the Oracle was the biggest commercial success published by Discis. However, by August 1996, it had nevertheless underperformed compared to forecasts. The company's John Lowry anticipated lifetime sales of 250,000 units, but, according to Anita Elash of Maclean's, "The game was popular, but sales stalled at 80,000 when Discis ran out of marketing money."

Computer Shopper deemed this game a "sleeper hit" and described it as "dazzling". Michael Ryan of PC Mag said the game was a "puzzle fan's dream come true". Entertainment Weekly described it as "adult", "pretty", "clever", "dry" and "claustrophobic", and likened the game to Myst. AdventureClassicGaming said that the lackluster ending "leaves the player puzzling as to the whole point of the story that has been so elaborately created." Interactive fiction personality Andrew Plotkin wrote that the game was "one-third recycled standard puzzles, one-third interesting variants of standard puzzles, and one-third new puzzles." WorldVillage praised the game for its gameplay and puzzles, but noted that it has zero replay value. Quandary Land gave it similar praise although noted that it can be a little bit frustrating. All Game Guide did not like the difficult and cumbersome interface.

Paul Glancey gave the Saturn version a 60% in Sega Saturn Magazine, stating that the puzzles are too difficult for most gamers, particularly in that with many of them the objective is not apparent.

Next Generation reviewed the PC version of the game, rating it one star out of five, and stated that "If you are just crazy about abstract puzzles, Jewels of the Oracle is right up your alley, otherwise, just keep shopping."

MacUser named Jewels of the Oracle one of the top 50 CD-ROMs of 1995. It was the third-place finalist for Computer Game Review's 1995 "Puzzle Game of the Year" award, which went to You Don't Know Jack. The editors called it "an entertaining romp through the historical annals of puzzledom."

=== Jewels II ===
Jewels II: The Ultimate Challenge is the sequel to Jewels of the Oracle. Enlarged to 3 discs with expanded interface and navigation, the followup was not created by the original production company (ELOI) or distributed by the original publisher (Discis). The original creator of Jewels, Courtland Shakespeare, formed a new production company in Toronto called Bardworks Ltd. and signed a distribution deal with software developer Corel. At the time of its release, H + A acquired Corel's CD Home Collection (over 60 titles) that included Jewels II. The game was subsequently acquired by Dreamcatcher Interactive, an international distributor that had previously acquired rights for the original Jewels game from Discis (following bankruptcy). Jewels II was also known as Gems of Darkness, but the title was changed to Jewels II to take advantage of the previous game's popularity. The games are now owned by THQ Nordic. Shakespeare later created another game for Dreamcatcher called Forever Worlds: Enter the Unknown.

Andrew Plotkin described the puzzles as "generally entertaining". AdventureClassicGaming said that Jewels II: The Ultimate Challenge was more of a "remake" than a sequel.

Jewels II was the runner-up for Computer Gaming World's award for the best classic game of 1998, although it lost to You Don't Know Jack: The Ride. The editors called Jewels II "a great design", and found it to be "well worth the time for anyone who enjoys challenging puzzles wrapped up in a simple, enjoyable package."
