= Just Adventure =

Adventure games website

- Website type: Gaming website
- Website: www.justadventure.com
- Commercial: Yes
- Launched: 1997

Just Adventure is a computer game website dedicated to the genre of adventure games. Founded in 1997, it publishes reviews and previews of adventure games, as well as opinion articles and interviews with game designers. The site was founded by Francis "Randy" Sluganski, who died on November 6, 2012, from cancer.

Ragnar Tornquist, the creator of the adventure games The Longest Journey and Dreamfall: The Longest Journey has stated that the reviews on Just Adventure are "very important to [him]". In 2000, PC Gamer US columnist Michael Wolf called Just Adventure "the best site on the Web for the adventure game fan". In 2003, Mark H. Walker noted that Just Adventure was "the Internet's largest gaming site devoted to adventure games". Similarly, Anastasia Salter wrote in 2014 that Just Adventure was "one of the major adventure game fan sites on the web".

== See also ==
- Adventure Gamers
