= Empire of the Ants (disambiguation) =

"Empire of the Ants" is a 1905 short story by H. G. Wells.

Empire of the Ants may also refer to:

- Empire of the Ants (film), 1977 horror film loosely based on the H.G. Wells story
- Empire of the Ants (novel), a 1991 science-fiction novel by Bernard Werber
- Empire of the Ants (2000 video game), a video game by Microïds, based on the novel
- Empire of the Ants (2024 video game), a video game by Microïds and Tower Five, based on the novel
