= Tennis Masters Series 2003 (video game) =

2002 tennis video game

- Developer: Microïds Canada
- Publishers: Microïds; Hip Interactive (Note: North American console versions)
- Engine: NetImmerse
- Platforms: Microsoft Windows; Xbox; PlayStation 2; Game Boy Advance
- Release: September 14, 2002
- Genre: Sports
- Modes: Single-player, multiplayer

Tennis Masters Series 2003 is a tennis sports video game developed by Microïds Canada. It was initially released for Microsoft Windows in September 2002, with versions subsequently released for Xbox, PlayStation 2, GameCube and Game Boy Advance. It is a sequel to Tennis Masters Series and is based on the former ATP Tour Masters 1000.

The game includes nine officially licensed Tennis Masters Series tournaments and a roster of 67 fictional players modelled on professional playing styles. Players can compete in exhibition matches, a career mode and a season based around the Tennis Masters Series. The Windows version also supports multiplayer over a local area network.

The game received mixed reviews. Critics generally considered it an improvement over its predecessor, particularly in its player movement and serving mechanics, but criticized its controls, artificial intelligence and limited variety.

== Gameplay ==
Tennis Masters Series 2003 is played from a third-person perspective behind the controlled player. The player can perform four principal types of shot: a flat or power shot, topspin, slice and lob. Shot direction is determined using the directional controls, while the strength of a serve is governed by a circular power meter.

The game includes exhibition, career and Tennis Masters Series modes. Exhibition matches can be played as singles or doubles, with options governing the number of sets, games, tie-breaks and player fatigue. In the Windows version, multiple players can participate on the same computer or using a local area network.

In the Tennis Masters Series mode, the player attempts to accumulate sufficient ranking points across a season to qualify as one of the eight participants in the concluding Masters Cup. The tournaments are played on courts representing locations such as Indian Wells, Miami, Monte Carlo, Rome, Hamburg, Cincinnati, Paris and Madrid.

The game contains 67 fictional competitors. Each has ratings governing abilities such as serving, forehand and backhand shots, volleys, stamina, speed and strength. Players are also divided into broad playing styles, including baseline players, power hitters and players who frequently approach the net.

The Windows release contains a career mode and player editor. The editor allows the appearance and equipment of a competitor to be customized, while career play involves improving a created player and entering tournaments.

== Development and release ==
Tennis Masters Series 2003 was developed by the Canadian division of Microïds. It followed Tennis Masters Series, with the developers revising the movement, artificial intelligence, graphics and serving system in response to problems identified in the preceding game.

The game used the official Tennis Masters Series licence but did not feature the names of contemporary professional players. Instead, its roster consisted of fictional competitors whose abilities and playing styles were intended to resemble those of professionals.

The Windows version was released on 14 September 2002. Console versions were distributed in North America by Hip Interactive. The Xbox version was released on 7 August 2003.

The Game Boy Advance version was separately developed for the handheld's technical capabilities and is substantially different from the home-computer and console versions.

== Reception ==
Reception

Aggregate score
Aggregator	Score
Metacritic	67/100 (Xbox)

The Xbox version of Tennis Masters Series 2003 received "mixed or average" reviews according to review aggregator Metacritic, which calculated a score of 67 out of 100 from ten reviews.

Brett Todd of GameSpot considered the Windows version a substantial improvement over Tennis Masters Series. He praised the more responsive movement, improved artificial intelligence and revised serving mechanic, but found that the players moved too quickly and that the user never obtained complete control over their actions.

In a review of the console version, Ryan Davis of GameSpot described the basic mechanics as sound but considered the game less accessible and entertaining than the Virtua Tennis series. Davis criticized its inconsistent swing system and limited number of game modes, although he found strategic uses for its different shot types.

Brent Doughty of Operation Sports praised the amount of licensed tournament content and the differences between the available players. He nevertheless criticized the controls and artificial intelligence, concluding that these problems made the game difficult to recommend even at its reduced North American price.

Other reviews were similarly divided. Play Magazine praised its intuitive and entertaining approach to tennis, while G4 commended its simulation of the professional tour and visual presentation. TotalGames.net and Xbox Nation criticized the gameplay and limited variety.
