= Highway patrol (disambiguation) =

Highway patrol is a police unit or agency dedicated to traffic safety compliance.

Highway Patrol may also refer to:

- Highway Patrol (film), a 1938 American action film
- Highway Patrol (American TV series), an action crime drama series
- Highway Patrol (Australian TV series), a factual television series
- Highway Patrol 2, a vehicle simulation and racing game

== See also ==
- "Highway Patrolman", a song by Bruce Springsteen
