= Au Pays de Vocabulon =

1997 video game

- Developer(s): index+
- Publisher(s): France Telecom Multimedia
- Platform(s): Macintosh, Windows
- Release: 1997
- Genre(s): Educational
- Mode(s): Single-player

Au Pays de Vocabulon is a French educational video game released in 1997 for Windows and Macintosh.
