= Speed Demons =

Speed Demons may refer to:

- Speed Demons, a 2012 direct-to video movie featuring Marina Sirtis
- Speed Demons (video game), a video game
- "Speed Demons" (Superman: The Animated Series), a 1997 episode from season two of Superman: The Animated Series
