= Gamebryo =

Video game engine

- Developers: Gamebase USA and Gamebase Co., Ltd.
- Release: 1997; 29 years ago
- Stable release: Gamebryo 3D and LightSpeed
- Preview release: Gamebryo 4.0 / March 2012; 14 years ago
- Written in: C++
- Operating system: Cross-platform
- Type: Game engine
- License: Proprietary
- Website: www.gamebryo.com

Gamebryo (/ɡeɪm.briːoʊ/; gaym-BREE-oh; formerly NetImmerse until 2003) is a game engine developed by Gamebase Co., Ltd. and Gamebase USA, that incorporates a set of tools and plugins including run-time libraries, supporting video game developers for numerous cross-platform game titles in a variety of genres, and served as a basis for the Creation Engine.

== History ==
Numerical Design Limited (NDL) was founded in 1983. They primarily completed contract work for government and computer-aided design (CAD) clients in the computer graphics sector; however, they also did work for some game developers such as Interactive Magic. This work led to the production of the NetImmerse game engine in 1997, evolving into Gamebryo by 2003.

NDL was merged into Emergent Game Technologies (EGT, founded 2000, Butterfly.net until May 2005) in August 2005. NetImmerse then evolved to Gamebryo LightSpeed. During 2009 the development staff of Gamebryo was downsized, and by July 2010 the engineering office in Chapel Hill, North Carolina was closed. On November 11, 2010, assets of EGT were offered for acquisition, including its intellectual property (IP), in whole or in part.

In December 2010, Korea-based Gamebase Co., Ltd., a longtime partner of EGT, finalized the acquisition of EGT assets and technology, and established a newly capitalized U.S. company, Gamebase USA. Gamebase USA is based in the Research Triangle Park region of North Carolina and is focused on continual development of the Gamebryo game engine. The newest version, Gamebryo 4.0, was introduced in March 2012.

== Features ==
The Gamebryo system is a suite of modular C++ libraries. Game developers can combine and extend the libraries to modify the engine for a particular game. Gamebryo's design emphasises a rapid prototyping approach aimed at an iterative development process.

The Gamebryo engine supports several deployment platforms including Microsoft Windows (DirectX 6–11), Mac, iOS, Android, Linux (OpenGL), GameCube, Wii, PlayStation, PS2, PSP, PS3, PS4, Xbox, Xbox 360, and Xbox One.

Gamebryo 4.0 is the latest version of the engine, designed to merge the original Gamebryo system with its LightSpeed spin-off.

== Games ==
Gamebryo is used by numerous companies within the gaming industry. Below is a sample of titles that have used the engine:

| Game | Year | Platform(s) | Developer | Publisher | Reference |
|---|---|---|---|---|---|
| Atlantica Online | 2008 | Windows | Ndoors | Ndoors | |
| BlackShot | 2008 | Windows | Vertigo Games | Vertigo Games, PlayOne Asia | |
| Bully: Scholarship Edition | 2008 | Windows, Xbox 360, Wii, iOS, Android | Rockstar Vancouver, Rockstar New England, Rockstar Toronto | Rockstar Games | |
| Catherine | 2011 | Windows, PS3, Xbox 360 | Atlus | Atlus | |
| Civilization IV | 2005 | Windows, Mac | Firaxis Games | 2K Games, Aspyr | |
| Civilization Revolution | 2008 | Xbox 360, PS3, Nintendo DS, iOS | Firaxis Games | 2K Games | |
| Dance on Broadway | 2010 | Wii, PS3 | Longtail Studios & AiLive | Ubisoft | |
| Dawntide | 2011 | Windows | Working As Intended | Working As Intended | |
| Defense Grid: The Awakening | 2008 | Windows, Mac, Xbox 360 | Hidden Path Entertainment | Hidden Path Entertainment, Microsoft Studios | |
| Divinity II | 2010 | Windows, Xbox 360 | Larian Studios | dtp entertainment, 1C, cdv Software Entertainment | |
| Dragonica | 2009 | Windows | Gravity Games | gPotato | |
| Drift City | 2007 | Windows | NPLUTO | NHN Corporation | |
| Defiance | 2013 | Windows, PS3, Xbox 360 | Trion Worlds, Human Head Studios | Trion Worlds | |
| Eden Eternal | 2011 | Windows | X-Legend | Aeria Games | |
| The Elder Scrolls IV: Oblivion | 2006 | Windows, Xbox 360, PS3 | Bethesda Game Studios | Bethesda Softworks, 2K Games | |
| El Shaddai: Ascension of the Metatron | 2011 | PS3, Xbox 360 | Ignition Entertainment | Ignition Entertainment | |
| Epic Mickey | 2010 | Wii | Junction Point Studios | Buena Vista (Disney Interactive Studios) | |
| Epic Mickey 2: The Power of Two | 2012 | Windows, Mac, Wii, Xbox 360, PS3 | Junction Point Studios | Buena Vista (Disney Interactive Studios) | |
| Fallout 3 | 2008 | Windows, Xbox 360, PS3 | Bethesda Game Studios | Bethesda Softworks | |
| Fallout: New Vegas | 2010 | Windows, Xbox 360, PS3 | Obsidian Entertainment | Bethesda Softworks | |
| Ghost in the Shell: Stand Alone Complex - First Assault Online | 2015 | Windows | Nexon Inc., Neople | NEXON Corporation | |
| Grand Chase | 2003 | Windows | KOG Studios | Level Up! Games | |
| Gujian Qitan | 2010 | Windows | Shanghai Aurogon | Gamebar | |
| IHRA Professional Drag Racing 2005 | 2004 | PlayStation 2, Windows, Xbox | Bethesda Game Studios | Bethesda Softworks | |
| IHRA Drag Racing: Sportsman Edition | 2005 | PlayStation 2, Windows, Xbox | Bethesda Game Studios | Bethesda Softworks | |
| Jeopardy! | 2009 | PS3 | Sony Computer Entertainment | Sony Computer Entertainment | |
| Kohan II: Kings of War | 2004 | Windows | TimeGate Studios | Take Two Interactive, Global Star Software | |
| LEGO Universe | 2010 | Windows, Mac | NetDevil | Warner Bros. Interactive Entertainment | |
| MapleStory 2 | 2015 | Windows | Nexon Inc., ProjectMS | NEXON Corporation | |
| MicroVolts | 2010 | Windows | SK iMedia | Rock Hippo Productions LTD | |
| Pirate101 | 2012 | Windows, Mac | KingsIsle Entertainment | KingsIsle Entertainment | |
| PowerUp Heroes | 2011 | Xbox 360 | Ubisoft | Ubisoft | |
| Ragnarok Online II: Legend of the Second | 2011 | Windows | Gravity Corp. | Gravity Corp. | |
| Rift | 2011 | Windows | Trion Worlds | Trion Worlds | |
| Rocksmith | 2011 | Windows, PS3, Xbox 360 | Ubisoft | Ubisoft | |
| Rocksmith 2014 | 2013 | Windows, Mac, PS3, Xbox 360, PS4, Xbox One | Ubisoft | Ubisoft | |
| Sid Meier's Pirates! | 2004 | Windows, Xbox, Mac, PSP | Firaxis Games | 2K Games; Atari | |
| Sid Meier's Railroads! | 2006 | Windows, Mac, Android, iOS | Firaxis Games | 2K Games, Feral Interactive | |
| Shin Megami Tensei: Imagine | 2007 | Windows | CAVE | Atlus, Aeria Games, Marvelous USA | |
| Speed Racer: The Videogame | 2008 | Wii, PS2 | Sidhe Interactive | Warner Bros. Interactive Entertainment | |
| Splatterhouse | 2010 | PS3, Xbox 360 | Namco Bandai Games | Namco Bandai Games | |
| Tenchu: Shadow Assassins | 2008 | Wii, PSP | Acquire | FromSoftware, Ubisoft | |
| Warhammer Online: Age of Reckoning | 2008 | Windows | Mythic Entertainment | Electronic Arts | |
| Warhammer Online: Wrath of Heroes | 2012 | Windows | BioWare Mythic | Electronic Arts | |
| Way of the Samurai 3 | 2008 | Windows, PS3, Xbox 360 | Acquire | Spike, Agetec, UFO Interactive Games, Rising Star Games, Ghostlight | |
| Wheel of Fortune | 2009 | PS3 | Sony Computer Entertainment | Sony Computer Entertainment | |
| Wizard101 | 2008 | Windows, Mac | KingsIsle Entertainment | KingsIsle Entertainment | |
| Yar's Revenge | 2011 | Windows, Xbox 360, PS3 | Killspace Entertainment | Atari | |

=== NetImmerse games ===
| Game | Year | Platform(s) | Developer | Publisher |
|---|---|---|---|---|
| Dark Age of Camelot | 2001 | Windows | Mythic Entertainment | Vivendi Universal Games |
| Oddworld: Munch's Oddysee | 2001 | Xbox, Game Boy Advance, Windows, PS3, PS Vita, iOS, Android, Mac | Oddworld Inhabitants | Infogrames, THQ, Oddworld Inhabitants |
| The Elder Scrolls III: Morrowind | 2002 | Windows, Xbox | Bethesda Game Studios | Ubisoft Entertainment |
| Freedom Force | 2002 | Windows, Mac | Irrational Games | Electronic Arts |
| Futurama | 2003 | Xbox, PS2 | Unique Development Studios Sweden | Vivendi Universal Games, SCi Games |
| Prince of Persia 3D | 1999 | Windows, Dreamcast | Mindscape | Red Orb Entertainment, Mattel Interactive |
| Simon The Sorcerer 3D | 2002 | Windows | Headfirst Productions | Adventure Soft |
| Star Trek: Bridge Commander | 2002 | Windows | Totally Games | Activision |
| Tetris Worlds | 2001 | Windows | Blue Planet Software | THQ |
| Wild Wild West: The Steel Assassin | 1999 | Windows | SouthPeak Interactive | SouthPeak Interactive |
| Zoo Tycoon 2 | 2004 | Windows | Microsoft Game Studios | |
| Tennis Masters Series | 2001 | Windows | Microids Canada | Microids |
| Tennis Masters Series 2003 | 2002 | Windows, Xbox, PlayStation 2, Gameboy Advance | Microids Canada | Microids, Hip Interactive |
