= Subject 13 =

Subject 13 may refer to:

- Subject 13 (Fringe), an episode of Fringe
- Subject 13 (video game), a point-and-click adventure game
