= Boomeranger =

Boomeranger may refer to:

- a member of the Boomerang Generation
- a fictional character in video game Trove
