= Open Kart =

2001 video game

- Developer: Microids
- Publisher: Microids
- Platform: Windows
- Release: 2001

Open Kart is a 2001 video game from Microids.

== Gameplay ==
Open Kart puts the player into the world of professional kart racing. The game emphasizes speed, precision, and customization. Players race across ten tracks modeled on real-world locations, each demanding careful timing and reflexive steering. The courses are flat and tightly bordered, punishing mistakes harshly—veer off the track and the car will slam into a wall. Customization is central: karts can be upgraded with new tires, brakes, torsion bars, gears, engines, and frames. Players can even adjust tire pressure, braking power, weight distribution, chassis rigidity, and track width, all of which noticeably affect performance. The career mode drives progression, with championships and amateur races awarding money for upgrades.

== Development ==
The game uses the NetImmerse 3D game engine and was showcased at E3 2001.

== Reception ==
Reception

Review scores
Publication	Score
4Players	75%
GameSpot	6.2/10
IGN	6.8/10
PC Zone	3.7/10
PC Gamer	32%
PC Action	71%

IGN gave the game a score of 6.8 out of 10' stating: "More liberal use of the premise would have garnered better results, but because it's a take on a less seen sport than other titles, its attempt and portrayal alone are commendable and respectable at least."
