= Road to India =

Road to India may refer to:

- Road to India (video game), an adventure video game released in 2001
- "Road to India" (Family Guy), 2016 television episode
