= Defiance (video game) =

2013 video game

- Developer: Trion Worlds (Note: Additional work by Human Head Studios.)
- Publisher: Trion Worlds
- Producer: Jeremy Spencer
- Artist: James H. Dargie
- Composer: Bear McCreary
- Engine: Gamebryo
- Platform: Microsoft Windows
- Release: NA: April 2, 2013; EU: April 2, 2013; AU: April 11, 2013
- Genres: Third-person shooter, action role-playing
- Mode: Multiplayer

Defiance is a massively multiplayer online third-person shooter developed and published by Trion Worlds. Defiance took place on a terraformed Earth several years into the future. It was a tie-in to the Syfy show of the same name. The game was released in April 2013 for Microsoft Windows, PlayStation 3 and Xbox 360. It was also released on Steam. The game went free-to-play on June 4, 2014 for PC, August 14, 2014 for PS3 and November 18, 2014 for Xbox 360. Official game servers, community forums, and social media outlets were shut down by owning company Gamigo on April 29, 2021. On March 7, 2025, Fawkes Games announced that it had acquired the licensing rights from Gamigo and relaunched the game on PC on April 18, 2025 through its proprietary launcher, Fawkes Hub.

== Gameplay ==
Characters come from one of four Origins: Veterans, Outlaws, Machinists, or Survivalists. Veterans are a group of soldiers who survived The Pale Wars, a massive conflict between humans and aliens. Outlaws are criminals who raid and destroy for fortunes. Machinists are scavengers, who recover alien technology to make profits and a living from it. Survivalists are humans or aliens who attempt to survive in the newly formed, hostile world. Besides initial starter weapon and also costume - this choice, similar to Race (Human, Irathient, and Castithan) has no consequence in the later game, with all weapons, abilities and costumes being equally accessible to all players beyond the tutorial area.

Players can choose to be either a Human or an "Irathient" (a humanoid alien species who are similar to humans), or the Castithan race if they have particular downloadable content available.

The Ark Hunters are injected with an EGO (Environmental Guardian Online), a symbiotic, neuro-muscular bionetic implant developed by Von Bach Industries, which helps players navigate the Bay Area and gives them access to unique abilities.

== Setting ==
The game takes place in the San Francisco Bay Area, 15 years after the devastating Pale Wars between Earth and a loose alliance of extraterrestrial races known as Votanis Collective. The Votans came to Earth seeking a new home after the destruction of their solar system, unaware that the planet was already inhabited. Friction between the new arrivals and Humanity led to war, during which the Votan's terraforming technology was unleashed. The Earth's surface was drastically altered as a result, introducing radical changes in topography, the extinction of plant and animal species, and the emergence of new species. Afterward, Humans and Votans were forced to live together. Player characters are enlisted as "Ark Hunters" by industrialist Karl Von Bach to search the Bay Area for advanced and expensive alien technology. Players also take part in side missions to earn cash or challenges in which they compete with other Ark Hunters.

== Plot ==
The opening cutscene, and main storyline mission of the game, begins with the player's Ark Hunter character accompanying Karl Von Bach and several other Ark Hunters, on a flying stratocarrier crewed and commanded by the Earth Republic Military (also known as E-Rep). In addition to the player's Ark Hunter, Irisa and Joshua Nolan from the TV series are both present during the opening cutscene. In charge of the stratocarrier is Captain Noah Grant. He has been tasked by his superiors with escorting Von Bach and his ark hunters to the bay area to search for "Ark Tech". Ark Tech is salvage from orbital debris that rains down to earth in small meteor shower like events called "Ark Falls". During their final approach Von Bach reveals to Grant that he is searching for the key remaining components of a terra spire to attempt to restore the earth and hopes to be hailed as a hero. Grant is annoyed at Von Bach for his disrespect and disregard for his men and protocol. He orders Von Bach and his Ark Hunters to prepare for landing as they pass over the Golden Gate Bridge and ruins of San Francisco. Von Bach starts to explain the information about an EGO implant you have but is interrupted as the stratocarrier rocks, experiencing sudden turbulence and temporary loss of lighting. E-Rep soldiers appear and tell Captain Grant he is needed on the bridge. As the player straps into their escape pod alongside Nolan and Irisa the stratocarrier is hit by an unknown force. An explosion ripples throughout the hold housing the escape pods and an alert over the intercom system states the hull has been compromised and begins to seal and jettison escape pods with the various Ark Hunters, including Nolan and Irisa. The player's escape pod button malfunctions and does not activate and seal until the last moment, as the hold is filled with fire and the screen goes black.

The player's escape pod is discovered by a local Irathient Ark Hunter named Cass Ducar. Shocked to find you alive, amidst several burned and/or destroyed escape pods, she helps the player to their feet. While Cass is talking to the player, the player's EGO implant activates and beings speaking to the player and introduces them to the various abilities and powers available to the player as a result of having an EGO implant through a tutorial. The player may choose one of four powers at start of the game and may eventually unlock all 4 and other misc. benefits as they progress through the game. The main powers to choose from provide a short term benefits in the form of a speed boost, a damage boost, cloaking/invisibility, or the ability to create a holographic decoy of themselves which they may swap positions with once via teleportation. The player also learns how to fire their weapons, use grenades, and basic movement. Eventually the player regroups with Cass Ducar and the two overcome several mutant clones from the now defunct Earth Military Coalition (EMC) and escape the immediate vicinity.

After searching unsuccessfully in an attempt to find Von Bach's or his escape pod, Cass and the player regroup with and assist Captain Grant overseeing the search and rescue of his men in the wreckage of the stratocarrier. They discover that not only is Von Bach missing, but many of the Ark Hunters, E-Rep, and other crew of the stratocarrier have perished in the crash. To her annoyance Cass is forced to remain with Grant for debriefing, while the player's Ark Hunter neutralizes threats to Grant's remaining soldiers while coordinating recovery and search and rescue around the Mount Tam area. Cass and the player team up to restart the K-TAM radio station and nearby antennas to increase communications coverage of the area. With the use of a E-Rep equipment, Cass and the player locate Von Bach's escape pod and data recorder. Upon listening to the audio recording stating Von Bach's decision to flee North, Cass learns that Von Bach has an Ark Core. Initially enraged that he has brought an Ark Core to the Bay Area, she commits to locating Von Bach so that no one else gets their hands on the Ark Core.

The two eventually locate and rescue Von Bach hiding in a storage locker from the EMC mutants in an underground bunker. Grant contacts the group by radio and instructs them to take Von Bach to the local "Lawkeeper", John Cooper in Madera. Upon meeting with Cooper at his ranch, he reluctantly agrees to help search for the remaining component as a favor to Captain Grant. While searching for leads on the remaining component, Cooper's ranch comes under attack by Raiders, a hostile gang faction that seek to loot and pillage the bay area. Cooper and the Ark Hunter save Von Bach, and stop the Raiders from stealing the Matrix. However with raiders able to brazenly attack his ranch in broad daylight, Cooper decides to take the Ark Core to the compound of the liaison for the community of Paradise, and formerly of the Votanis Collective (VC), Ara Shondu. While conversing with Shondu, a local business merchant Varus Soleptor ease drops and tries to take advantage of the circumstances. Varus volunteers to provide information on the whereabouts of the Matrix in exchange for assistance with dealing with Raider attacks.

== Development ==
Defiance had been in development since August 2008. It started as a collaborative effort between Trion and Syfy to make a video game that ran alongside a television series. The publisher has reportedly spent more than $70 million during development.

The game's business model was changed from a paid game to a free-to play game on May 1, 2014 so as to introduce the game to a broader audience. Trion Worlds also added that they would consider the possibility of developing a port for PlayStation 4 and Xbox One once the consoles have a large player base.

In October 2015, Syfy announced that the Defiance show would be discontinued after the end of its third season, but Trion Worlds would continue to support the game after the show's cancellation. On March 1, 2016, Trion announced the "Dark Metamorphosis" update for the game, which was publicized as Season Four of Defiance.

=== Defiance 2050 ===
In December 2017, Trion Worlds confirmed a PlayStation 4 version of the game was in development. They also stated they had no plans of making a sequel, instead they will continue to update the game with new content. The new version, named Defiance 2050, came out on July 10, 2018 for PC, Xbox One, and PS4. It features the same map, story, missions, NPCs, enemies, sounds, HUD, and other assets from the first game; however, the four classes have been replaced with four new ones, each of which has its own EGO power tree. Many of the weapons were also replaced, weapon skills were consolidated, and some other minor tweaks were made. Cosmetic items that were purchased for the first game are automatically copied to Defiance 2050, but other items are not, including any items that players won from loot crates that were paid for with cash (like the Omec Respark Energizer V). Player characters cannot be transferred from the first game to the second. Like its predecessor, Defiance 2050 was free to play.

== Server closure ==
On April 27, 2020, Gamigo announced on the official Defiance forums that the Defiance servers for Xbox 360 would be shut down on May 25, 2020 and the game would no longer be accessible. PC and PS3 servers would be unaffected by this shutdown. Any users who had an account for Defiance 2050 or wished to create one, would be given a one time special compensation and transfer benefit based on various in game progress factors and purchases on their accounts.

On February 24, 2021, Gamigo announced that both Defiance and Defiance 2050 were shutting down on April 29, 2021 and at 2:00 AM Pacific Standard Time that day both servers were shut down. The community forums and all official social media pages related to the Defiance franchise were also shut down within 24 hours.

== Revival Under Fawkes Games ==
On March 7, 2025 Fawkes Games announced on their website, "We’re excited to announce that we have licensed the worldwide development and publishing rights for both Defiance 2013 and Defiance 2050 in all platforms". On March 13, 2025 Fawkes posted an FAQ providing additional details. On March 31, 2025 Fawkes announced there would be a "Stress Test Event" on April 5, 2025 stating on their website, "This is a unique opportunity to experience the almost-final version of the game, provide valuable feedback, and help us ensure a smooth launch on April 18, 2025." The event launched with many players reporting having difficulties launching the game through the Fawkes Hub launcher. The event was extended by over 2 hours due to crashes and other technical issues reported by players attempting to launch, log in, and play the game in the Fawkes Games community Discord server. The Votan Castithan race was shown in the character creator, but was not available due to Fawkes locking the Castithan DLC during the stress test event.

The studio relaunched the original 2013 version of the game on April 18, 2025, beginning with a PC release.

The revival marks a fresh start for the franchise—prior accounts and purchases do not carry over, and players are required to create new accounts. The game is free-to-play with optional microtransactions, and is currently available exclusively through the Fawkes Games launcher, with possible expansion to other platforms based on community interest.

At launch, previously released downloadable content (DLC), including story missions and events, was not yet available. Fawkes Games had stated that these features will return once server stability has been fully established. By August 11th 2025, all DLC and its contents were released as free updates for all players and later announced on Fawkes website.

== Reception ==
Reception

Aggregate score
Aggregator	Score		
Aggregator	PC	PS3	Xbox 360
Metacritic	64/100	59/100	60/100

Review scores
Publication	Score		
Publication	PC	PS3	Xbox 360
Edge	5/10	N/A	N/A
Electronic Gaming Monthly	N/A	N/A	5.5/10
Eurogamer	N/A	N/A	5/10
GameRevolution	N/A	N/A	2/5
GameSpot	6.5/10	6/10	6/10
GameTrailers	6.9/10	N/A	6.9/10
IGN	5.9/10	5.2/10	5.5/10
PlayStation Official Magazine – UK	N/A	5/10	N/A
Official Xbox Magazine (US)	N/A	N/A	6/10
PC Gamer (UK)	62%	N/A	N/A
PC PowerPlay	6/10	N/A	N/A
Polygon	6.5/10	5/10	5/10
Digital Spy	N/A	2/5	N/A
The Escapist	N/A	2.5/5	N/A

The game received "mixed or average" reviews on all platforms according to the review aggregation website Metacritic.

411Mania gave the Xbox 360 version a score of seven out of ten and called it "a good foundation for a console MMO." The Digital Fix similarly gave it seven out of ten and said that it "settles into its rhythm very nicely and becomes a game that is so easily picked up and played you cannot help but fall for it a little." National Post gave the PlayStation 3 version a score of six out of ten, saying that it "seems simply to offer yet another big open world filled with weapons to collect and creatures to kill. I won’t deny that I’ve had moments of fun blowing holes in Hellbugs over the last week, but it was of a flavourless variety I could have derived from any number of other third-person shooters." The Escapist gave the same console version two-and-a-half stars out of five and called it "a middle-of-the road third-person shooter that never seems to fully capitalize on its alien-filled, post apocalyptic setting." Digital Spy gave it two stars out of five and said, "The potential is there for Defiance to be more than a half-decent console MMO marred by technical problems." Metro UK gave the Xbox 360 version a similar score of four out of ten and said, "A mix of low budget, (relatively) high ambition, and mediocre execution, Defiance is a hard game to hate but an easy one to lose interest in."
