= Nicky Boom =

1992 video game

- Developer: Microïds
- Publisher: Microïds
- Designers: Alain Lambin; Dominico Manfredi
- Platforms: Amiga, Atari ST, MS-DOS, Windows, Mac OS X, mobile
- Release: Amiga, Atari, MS-DOS; 1992; WIN, iOS; 2008; Mac OS; 2011
- Genre: Platform game
- Mode: Single-player

Nicky Boum, more commonly known as Nicky Boom, is a side-scrolling platform game developed and originally released for the Amiga, Atari ST and MS-DOS by Microïds in 1992. The game began a second life in 2008, with a remake for mobile phones, which was made available for Windows computers late in 2008. It was also ported to the Tapwave Zodiac handheld in 2006. It has been also ported to PlayStation 2 as a homebrew version. and is available for Mac OS X on the Mac App Store. In Nicky Boom, the player controls the titular boy trying to rescue his grandfather from a wicked witch. The game received mostly positive reviews and a sequel titled Nicky 2.

== Gameplay ==
After little Nicky's grandfather was kidnapped by the cruel Zoldrane the Sorceress to force him to help her make an evil spell, the boy sets on a journey through a fantastical land to defeat the witch and save the old man and the world. The player controls Nicky who can walk, jump and throw apple cores to defend himself from Zoldrane's monstrous minions. The player can pick up other items to throw at monsters, such as bouncy balls and logs that can be also used to build bridges at certain parts of the levels. Nicky is also able to jump on enemies to defeat them, which is often more difficult but the killed monsters may drop items. The game consists of eight levels based on four separate themes, including swamp, forest and castle.

== Reception ==
Nicky Boom received mixed but mostly positive reviews, including ratings of 50% from Amiga Power, 64% from Amiga Joker, 65% from CU Amiga, and 83% from Génération 4. Joystick awarded the game a 92% for the Amiga version, a 90# for the Atari ST version, and 80% for the PC version. A review by Amiga Computing (82%) stated Nicky Boom "is unlikely to be remembered as an all-time Amiga great, but having said that, it does possess that certain addictiveness and fun quality that many games in that genre lack."

== Sequel ==
Nicky Boom was followed by a sequel titled Nicky 2 (or Nicky II) released for the same platforms in 1993–2009. In this game, Nicky needs to defeat Zoldrane's vengeful sister with the help of a magic goose.
