= 500 cc Grand Prix =

1987 video game

- Developer: Microïds
- Publisher: Microïds
- Series: Grand Prix 500
- Platforms: Amstrad CPC, Atari ST, Commodore 64, MS-DOS, Thomson TO7
- Release: EU: 1987
- Genres: Racing, simulation
- Modes: Single-player, Multiplayer, split-screen multiplayer

500 cc Grand Prix is a motorcycle racing video game developed by Microïds and released in 1987 for the Amstrad CPC, MS-DOS, Commodore 64, Atari ST, and Thomson TO7. The game includes a multiplayer mode, considered by magazines to be the technology of the future.

== Gameplay ==
The game provides a two-player split-screen mode and three levels of general difficulty. Players can choose between the training mode, a single Grand Prix, or the World Championship.

During a race, the screen is split into two vertical halves showing the point of view of two racers. In single-player mode, one screen has the player's motorcycle, while the other has a motorcycle controlled by the computer. In two-player mode, each player is given one side of the screen. The camera is positioned in the third person perspective behind the bike, with a Heads Up Display showing various indicators. The controls consist of accelerating, braking, steering (pushed at two different inclinations), and gear changing between the four available gears. In the event of an accident or crash, the player is penalized and will restart immediately from a stationary position where they crashed.

Atari ST screenshot

In training mode, there are only two laps and two racers per circuit; contrary to a single Grand Prix, there are nine laps and six racers — four racers for the C64 version — for each circuit. The game contains a total of twelve available circuits, inspired by those of real life. In the DOS and Atari ST versions, there is a save mode after every race.

In the World Championship mode, the player or players must run all twelve circuits with the aim of obtaining a final classification or score based on their placements across all twelve races. Similar to the Grand Prix mode, each circuit contains nine laps with six participating motorcycles — again, with the C64 having four — and there is a save mode after each race in the DOS and Atari ST versions.

== Reception ==
The first French-produced game was mentioned twice in the French magazine Jeux & Stratégie.
