= Atlas Reactor =

2016 video game

- Developer: Trion Worlds
- Publisher: Trion Worlds
- Platform: Microsoft Windows
- Release: NA: October 4, 2016
- Genre: Turn-based tactics
- Mode: Multiplayer

Atlas Reactor was a free-to-play turn-based tactics game developed by Trion Worlds. In Atlas Reactor, the player took the role of a Freelancer in the megacity of Atlas. The game was released in October 2016 and it shut down on June 28, 2019.

== Gameplay ==
With the exception of custom game modes, matches in Atlas Reactor are 4-on-4, player versus player, turn-based tactics battles. Players can die and respawn indefinitely, but teams win by being the first to five kills or by having the most kills after 20 turns (or more for sudden death overtime). Turns are divided into two modes: Decision Mode and Resolution Mode. In the decision mode, players have 20 seconds to coordinate tactics, select actions, and lock them in. In the Resolution Mode, these action resolve over four phases: the Prep phase allows for setting traps, placing shields, and casting buff/debuffs before any movement or damage is done; the Dash phase contains all dodges and charges which may deal damage; the Blast phase is for shooting, blasting, and any other stationary attacks, followed by knock-back attacks, which render the targets unable to move during the Move phase; the Move phase allows for player movement after all other actions with more movement granted to those who used no (or free) actions. Within each phase, all players actions are calculated simultaneously but are rendered sequentially for the player. Therefore, a character seen dying before their action will remain standing until it is completed.

=== Seasons ===
Each Season is a period of real time during which the player can level up an account, gaining Season Levels. It also contains multiple chapters, each with its own quests, called Missions, that when completed, unlock animated sprites which can be used in-game for free, several times each match. A user's season level resets to zero at the beginning of each new season with the balance adding to the user's overall Reactor Level. There are also daily missions, which are selected from a choice of three when logging in. These missions provide varying amounts of experience based on difficulty and how often the particular mission has been chosen. Season 1 began with the launch and Season two rolled out January 17, 2017.

== Plot ==
=== Backstory ===
Atlas is a megacity populated with humans, hybrids, and robots controlled by powerful Trusts. Freelancers fulfill contracts for their trusts to maintain control over the Atlas Reactor - a technologically advanced energy source that powers the megacity and its inhabitants. There were once thirteen such reactors monitored and controlled by the Global Artificial Intelligence Agent (GAIA). Humanity was in a golden age without poverty, drought, famine, or disease. Ultimately, they were able to conquer death itself. However, after 150 years of prosperity, GAIA mysteriously departed. This led to a cascading failure of reactors beginning with Tethys and ending with Hyperion thus leaving Atlas as the only reactor on the planet. As is always the case when resources are limited, war broke out. The Titan War saw soldiers, war machines, and refugees battling for control of the Reactor for almost 30 years until the forces of Atlas, Hyperion, and Oceanus were able to unite to end the struggle. As victors, they formed an uneasy alliance and divided the city of Atlas between them.

=== Trusts ===
Omni

Omni Trust was born in the heart of the Atlas reactor. They seek to reclaim the glory of the "Immortal Age" not just for themselves, but for all mankind. Freelancers associated with this trust apply digitized nanite technology to control the battlefield (Aurora, Su-Ren, Juno, Elle, Orion, Tol-Ren)

EvoS

Evolution Solutions (EvoS) is the premiere bio-hybridization Trust. Founded in the bioengineering superpower Oceanus, their focus lies in genetic superiority and zoological diversity. Freelances associated with this trust rely on the adaptability and unbounded freedom that is only possibly though genetic manipulation (Rask, Nix, Gremolitions Inc., Dr. Finn, Phaedra).

Warbotics (Defunct)

Warbotics creates and employs war machines in the forms of robotic suits as well as fully mechanized warriors. The trust was founded around the Hyperion reactor to the north where their machines brought peace to the struggling area. At the conclusion of the in-game trust war during Season 1, Warbotics was defeated and dissolved. Freelancers associated with the trust use superior firepower and advanced technology that was hardened during the battle for Hyperion. (Formerly PUP, Rampart, Oz, Garrison, Blackburn, Orion)

Helio Corps

After saving the Atlas reactor at the end of Season 1, Helio became a hero and was volunteered to head a new trust. Helio Corps is a collection of Helio's closest friends. (Celeste, Lockwood, PUP, Zuki, Helio, Khita, Titus)

Helio United (Defunct)

In order to bring stability to Atlas, EvoS and Omni Trust met with Helio to form a new trust of their own vetted freelances. This group forms the Helio United trust. The competition between Helio's two trusts in Season 2 Chapter 1 saw the defeat of Helio United in favor of Helio Corps. (Formerly Blackburn, Grey, Oz, Brynn, Titus)

Hyperbotics

Formed by Meridian from ex-residents of Hyperion and former members of Warbotics, Hyperbotics is sometimes referred to as the successors of the now fallen trust, seeking to continue where it had left off and improve upon its accomplishments while trying to avoid another downfall. (Meridian, Rampart, Blackburn, Oz, Garrison, Brynn)

=== Characters ===
Firepower

Blackburn is the former leader of the Warbotics special ops squad, Ares 1. After going AWOL, he has returned to the fray as a mechanized super soldier. Weapons include rifle, grenades, and aerial support.

Celeste (Helio Corps) is a thief for hire. She claims to have infiltrated all three of the original trusts. Weapons: Nanite grapplers, smoke bombs, and proximity traps.

Elle (Omni) is rumored the highest ranking enforcer of Omni Trust, Agent L. Her primary weapon is a custom plasma gun and is supported by a remote-firing drone.

Gremolitions Inc. (EvoS) consists of two vat-grown gremunks. They somehow outlived their expiration date and were subsequently put to work for EvoS. Gremolitions Inc. focuses on one thing: bombs.

Grey is the wealthy heiress of Hawk Aviation. After an attack killed her family and left her gravely wounded, Grey used her fortune to hunt the monsters in the depths of Atlas. Weapons: Crossbow and attack drone.

Juno (Omni) was hired by Omni as their head of security after recognizing her skills at dispatching enemies. Her Omni-provided weaponry include twin cannons, shields, and explosive tethers.

Kaigin is believed to have gained the power to warp through the reactor's energy fields by a nanite infusion as part of Omni's Project Nidus. In battle, he relies on his daggers and shuriken.

Lockwood (Helio Corps) became the go-between for the trusts after they took control of Atlas. His emergence as the first freelancer prompted the creation of a wider Freelancing Initiative, opening the doors for any others who wished to gain access to resurrection.

Nix (EvoS) is shrouded in mystery to the point that not even the employees of EvoS are sure he exists. His invisibility makes him the ultimate killer along with his sniper rifle and overwatch drone.

Oz is a malfunctioning toy from Warbotics subsidiary Toybotics. Originally sold as "Jimmy 6 and His Magic Tricks" he is now a fully endorsed freelancer. Weapons: Lasers and holographic afterimages.

PUP (Helio Corps) is a prototype stealth spy-bot who was adopted and subsequently modded by Zuki. His diverse weaponry include giant jaws, a grappling leash, rocket boosters, invisibility, and a powerful sound system.

Zuki (Helio Corps) is a modder and machinist who was formerly under the care of Lockwood. She has a penchant for all things explosive. This is reflected in her weapon loadout of various missiles and sticky bombs.

Frontline

Asana was another participant in Omni's Project Nidus. Her nanite infusion allows her to create protective force fields as she wields an ancient sword forged in the heart of the reactor.

Brynn (Helio United) hails from the lands around Hyperion where her family once ruled. It is believed that she joined the fight as a freelancer due to the fall of the Warbotics Trust. Weapons: Spear, daggers, and shield.

Garrison (Omni) is a war hero who was granted the first resurrection contract sponsored by Warbotics. His Ballistic Exo Suit provides him weapons such as a piston powered punch, arm cannon, missile barrage, jet pack, and aerial drop shock pod.

Phaedra (EvoS) is an abomination thrown together from leftover EvoS experiments. She lives under Atlas terrorizing the citizens with her seismic attacks and insect swarms.

Rampart (Helio Corps) is a warbot designed with a limited AI to circumvent the ban put in place after GAIA's desertion. He is armed with a telescoping blade and an impenetrable shield.

Rask (EvoS) has gained the most popularity of any of EvoS's creations with plushies and drinks bearing his name and likeness. His body infused with "Power Juice", he can heal and spray enemies when not rending them with his claws.

Titus (Helio Corps) comes from the wastes outside of Atlas where it is rumored that nothing lives. He battled countless beasts in order to make it to the city where he battles with his sword and dagger.

Support

Aurora (Omni) appeared from the reactor soon after the mysterious disappearance of an Omni scientist studying Quark. Her atomic control over matter allows her to simultaneously heal allies and damage foes.

Dr. Finn (EvoS) is a scientist studying reactor-powered fish hybridization who, when the supply of volunteers ran dry, subjected himself to his experiments. His load-out includes a water cannon and electric eels.

Helio (Helio Corps) is a genius inventor recruited my Omni and later tasked with founding a new trust to further develop reactor-powered technology. Helio supports his team with shields, black holes, disruption walls and a seismic hammer.

Dr. Orion Strand (Omni) was inspired by the rematerialization of Aurora and sought to create a robotic suit that would allow him to harness the energy of the reactor. The results were, to some degree, successful as we now has the unique ability to absorb damage as energy and blast enemies with it.

Quark (EvoS) is an anomaly that exploded forth from Atlas with abilities similar to the reactor itself. Nobody is entirely sure what Quark is or what its motives are. Quark can bond to allies and enemies, rearranging their atoms to suit its needs.

Su-Ren (Omni) is actually an AI descended from GAIA. She now runs Omni's Project Nidus, guiding and training the warriors in the wastes just outside the city. Her powers allow her to quickly dash around the map doling heals, damage, buffs, debuffs, and shields while also laying damage with her staff.

Khita was raised in the Waste and mentored by Titus. She is a skilled archer who uses specialized arrows and flechettes to deal damage and support her allies.

== Development ==
According to lead designer Will Cook, the game's concept draws inspiration from XCOM: Enemy Unknown, League of Legends, and tabletop games such as Warhammer 40,000. The designers’ ultimate question was, “How do you make a turn-based game where you’re playing more than you’re waiting?” Within two days, executive producer Peter Ju created a playable prototype in the Unity game engine.

== Business Model ==
Atlas Reactor began with a trial-until-you-buy business model, allowing anyone to play Freelancers from the "Free Rotation", which cycles once per week. If players chose to purchase the game, they unlocked the ability to play as any Freelancer during any match, aside from game mode limitations, and to participate in a Ranked Queue. Cook has called not needing to worry about free-to-play monetization tactics, "a godsend." With the introduction of Season 2, Atlas Reactor has gone fully free-to-play. Players can now purchase freelancers outside the free rotation with real world or in game currency earned through playing.

== eSports ==
Atlas Reactor had a few introductory competitive tournaments. One was maintained by the amateur group, PrepPhase. The other was managed by ESL, a large professional eSports organization, as a part of their Go4Cup series

== Reception ==
Reception

Aggregate scores
| Aggregator | Score |
|---|---|
| GameRankings | 79.89% (9 reviews) |
| Metacritic | 81/100 (12 critics) |

Review score
| Publication | Score |
|---|---|
| GameSpot | 8/10 |

Awards
| Publication | Award |
|---|---|
| MMOGames.com | Best PvP - PAX West 2016 |
| MMOGames.com | Best New Online Game 2016 |

Atlas Reactor has been well received by critics, with aggregate review websites GameRankings and Metacritic assigning scores of 79.89% and 81/100, respectively.

GameSpot gave it an 8/10 and called it "Unique and fresh." Redbull eSports said that the game, "has everything it takes to turn heads in the competitive space," and GameHyped called it, "the breath of fresh air esports has been hoping for."

At the 2016 PAX West in Seattle, Washington, Atlas Reactor won the MMOGames.com award for "Best PvP". They described the "fast, exciting and simultaneous PvP action" as combining "the fun, competitive aspects of a MOBA with the strategic thought process of chess."

Ars Technica named Atlas Reactor one of its "best video games of 2016" with writer Sam Machkovech praising that after countless attempts to get hooked on MOBAs, Atlas Reactor "[swept] me off my skeptical feet."
