= Rift (video game) =

2011 video game

RIFT
- Standard edition cover art
- Developer: Trion Worlds (2011–2018) Gamigo (2018–present)
- Publisher: Gamigo US
- Composer: Inon Zur
- Engine: Gamebryo
- Platforms: Microsoft Windows, Android
- Release: Windows: NA: March 1, 2011; AU: March 2, 2011; EU: March 4, 2011; Android; January 25, 2012
- Genre: Massively multiplayer online role-playing game
- Mode: Multiplayer

Rift (previously known as Rift: Planes of Telara, and as Heroes of Telara during alpha testing) is a fantasy free-to-play massively multiplayer online role-playing game developed by Trion Worlds. Rift takes place within the fantasy world of Telara. Two competing factions, composed of a selection of races and classes, battle each other and the enemies who emerge from dynamic "rifts". The game was released in March 2011. A port of the game, called Rift Mobile, was released for Android on January 25, 2012.

Rift received generally positive reviews from game critics. In August 2011, Trion announced that 1 million users/players have played the game and by January 2012 it had earned $100 million in total revenue.

In March 2018, Trion launched the game's first progression server called Rift Prime, which features sequential expansions unlocked throughout the year, minimal cosmetic item shop and a fresh start for all characters created. This server requires a monthly subscription to play. A month after launch in April 2018, Trion called the server a "massive success" for the company, stating that the server had set new records for event participation and continued to have a strong active population.

On October 22, 2018, Trion Worlds was acquired by Gamigo. Gamigo US subsequently took over the title of publisher and developer on October 26, 2018 after Trion Worlds was disbanded.

On April 7, 2019, RIFT Prime closed down. Players were able to transfer their characters to RIFT Live.

== Plot ==
=== Backstory ===
Telara is the focal point of the elemental Planes: Air, Fire, Water, Earth, Life, and Death—and one point where every one of these Planes intersect with each other. Each Plane is governed by a dragon-deity, a personification of that elemental force. Through the actions of the Dragon of Extinction, Regulos, the various dragons have united in an alliance known as the Blood Storm, for the purpose of invading Telara and gaining use of the intersection of all of their realms. In the past, the Blood Storm was defeated by the inhabitants of Telara with the help of the Vigil, the most powerful of the native gods.

Regulos was cast out into the elemental Planes, while its five compatriots were trapped within Telara and chained beneath a ward designed to close Telara off from external threats. However, Regulos had recently gained entry to Telara, destroying the ward and causing rifts to open, feeding the strength of the trapped dragons and allowing their minds to enter in a bid to destroy Telara's defenders. Players take on the role of the Ascended, resurrected superhuman warriors tasked to defeat the forces of Regulos and cleanse Telara of the threat of the Storm forever.

=== Factions and races ===
Opposing Regulos within Telara are two factions: the Guardians and the Defiant. The Guardians piously follow the religion of the Vigil, the supreme gods of Telara. They include the high elves, the Mathosians (a warlike culture of humans from the north), and dwarves. Ascended Guardians were resurrected by the Vigil after they died at the hands of Regulos, during his return to Telara. Guardians fight and die against one of Regulos' commanders, only to be brought back at the beginning of Rift.

The Defiant are those who, for cultural, historic, or personal reasons, do not follow the religion of the Vigil and have put their trust in science and technology as a way to conquer the forces of Regulos. They include the Eth (a highly advanced human culture from the south), the Bahmi (descendants of interbreeding between Air spirits and humans), and the Kelari (animistic, cabalistic dark elves). Ascended Defiant were resurrected through technology based on the study of the soul-structure of ascended Guardians, in an apocalyptic future in which Telara has nearly been consumed by Regulos. At the beginning of the game, Defiant faction players are sent back in time from this point to the beginning of Rift, allowing them to fight at an opportune moment in Telara's timeline, to overthrow the religion of the Vigil and defeat Regulos.

== Gameplay ==
Gameplay screenshot

Rifts are areas of elemental instability that represent the intrusion of elemental planes into the land of Telara. Once opened, these rifts begin to spawn monsters that proceed to march towards important points on the map. It is up to players to defeat these monsters and to close the rifts. If rifts are left unchecked, the invading monsters will eventually conquer large portions of the map, inflicting casualties and significantly hampering the operations in that area. Entering the area around a rift triggers a prompt for the player to join a public group, rather than forcing the player to manually create a group. After sealing a rift, players are rewarded based on their contribution to the fight, such as healing, dealing damage, or buffing other players. The severity and locations of rifts are entirely dynamic. Rifts of six different types (earth, fire, air, water, life, and death) are possible, and rifts of different types will oppose each other. In addition, Non-player characters hostile to the player may engage rift invaders. With the addition of Storm Legion, Hunt Rifts can be summoned by players creating a "survival" style of combat where players defend conduits from waves of invaders culminating in a boss battle. Hunt Rifts have varying degrees of difficulty and as the difficulty increases the player rewards also increase.

Rift offers several types of dungeons/instances including Dungeons and Raids. Players may team up in groups of 5 to battle through Normal, Expert or Master mode Dungeons. Each level of dungeon challenges players to overcome unique strategies and encounters. Dungeons provide players with a chance to acquire higher level items and currencies to use throughout the game. In addition to Dungeons, players may also choose to enter 10-man or 20-man Raids which require teamwork and good equipment to be successful. Raids are considered end-game content and contain the toughest encounters Rift has to offer.

Each character chooses between five different callings: Warrior, Cleric, Rogue, Mage or Primalist. Each class (with the exception of the Primalist) starts with access to eight different 'souls' from that calling, which have trees to which they can allocate a number of points gained each level. An additional two souls can be purchased for every calling bar the Primalist which currently only possesses six in total. Rift's soul trees have two levels: branches, which are the specific abilities/bonuses that the player allocates the points to, and roots, which are the soul's base abilities that are unlocked as the player allocates a certain number of points into the branches. All races may become all classes.

The soul system allows players to customize their characters to a high degree. The player chooses three souls from within their calling, and allocates earned points into talent trees for each soul. A Cleric wishing to tank may select justicar for its defensive properties and ability to heal the group as it deals damage, sentinel to increase his healing capabilities, and shaman to increase his melee damage output (thus increasing the amount of damage-based healing and threat generation). A Cleric may have both justicar and sentinel, but may have more points allocated into sentinel than justicar, and then choose warden as the third soul for its burst damage and heal-over-time spells, to make the character more of a healer than a tank.

Players may also keep up to twenty different soul configurations (called roles), which may be activated whenever the player is not in combat, meaning a player can switch from a healer to a damage dealer as the group needs. Because the player's abilities come from the points allocated in the soul trees, two roles that share no souls will have no abilities or bonuses in common with each other. This allows players a greater degree of versatility than is normally allowed in MMORPGs. These combinations allow players to play multiple roles in PvE, PvP, party, and raid gameplay. Therefore, a rogue could either do ranged or melee dps, provide support, or tank. Clerics, unlike in other MMOs, allows for damaging and tanking abilities instead of being confined exclusively to healing. Mages provide both ranged and melee damage through direct damage and damage over time abilities. They can provide fantastic support via group or tank healing, as well as debilitating destructive debuffs and crowd control. Warriors can fulfill several roles, either damage, tanking, or support.

Rift's character customization allows players to alter specific aspects of their avatars. Characters may change hairstyles, facial features, height, sex, tattoos, and skin colors during character creation. Originally, these attributes were unable to be changed in game, but patch 1.9 added a barbershop which allowed for re-customization of all aspects but race and sex. Each race has a limited skin color palette and set of race-specific features. For example, the Bahmi's hairstyles for females include numerous bald or almost-bald options while the high elves have hairstyles that contain flowers. The player can also customize the appearance of all armor by applying a coloured dye or by using the appearance of another item.

Rift also features an expansive wardrobe system. If a player finds a particular piece of equipment that pleases them visually, they can equip it in a wardrobe slot that overwrites currently equipped items, visual model. For each wardrobe slot, a player can equip alternate gloves, shoulders, boots, pants, and chest pieces. There are various vanity items that players receive for completing dungeons, quests, or rift events in game. All together, the player can purchase up to five wardrobe slots, with the price of each subsequent slot increasing substantially.

At launch, Rift included approximately 12,000 weapons which players could equip to their character. Weapon rarities are common (white), uncommon (green), rare (blue), epic (purple), and relic (orange). Weapons include swords, axes, maces, staves, wands, bows, guns, daggers, and shields. Swords, hammers, axes, and maces, and pole arms may also be two handed.

== Development ==
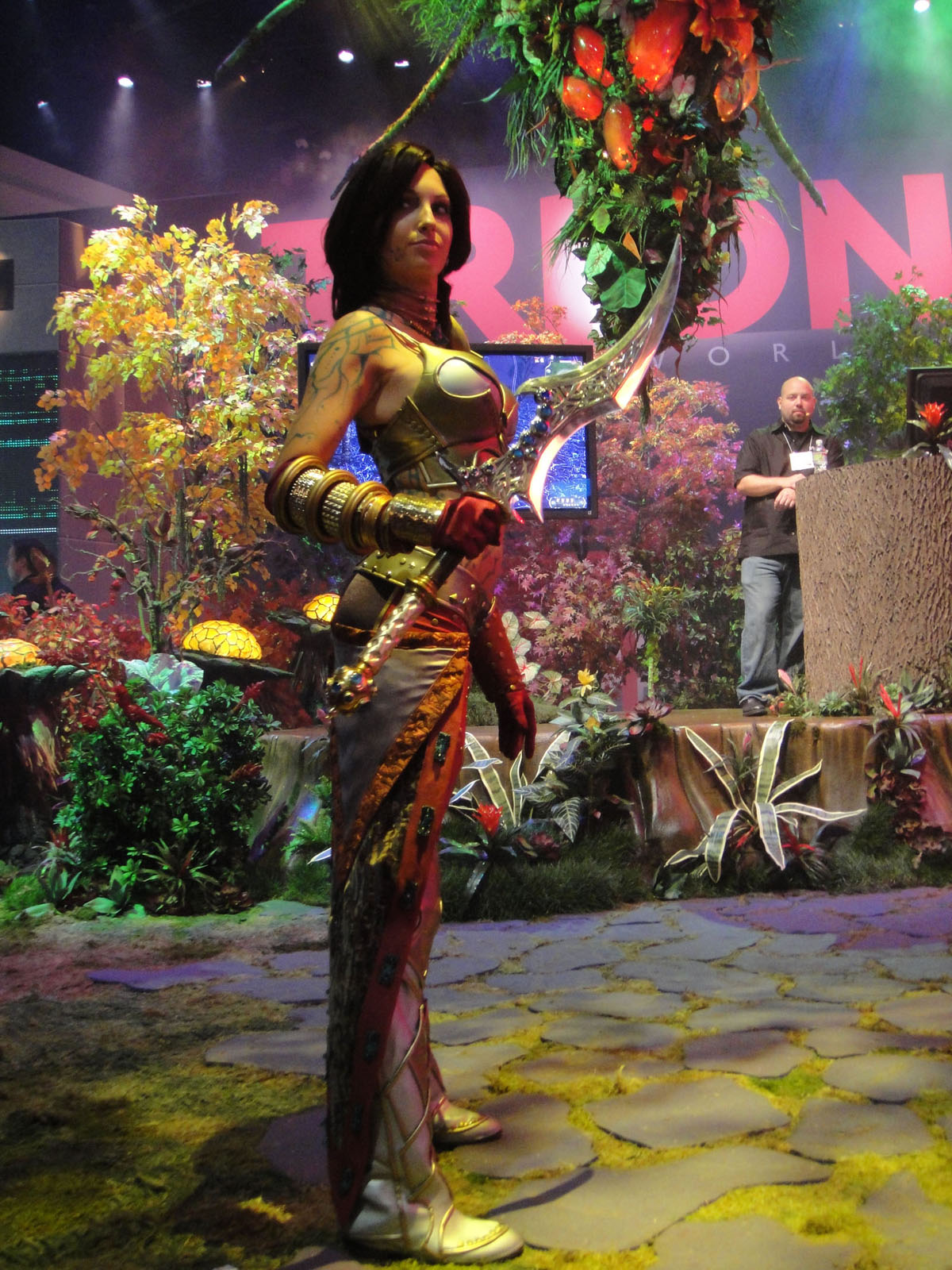
Promotion of Rift at E3 2010

Rift was in development from 2006 until its release in 2011 and underwent extensive alpha testing, with beta testing finalizing the stress test portion of development. Trion Worlds CEO Lars Buttler has stated that Rift had an initial budget of "over US$50 million". A trailer featuring game footage was released for the Electronic Entertainment Expo (E3) in late May 2009 and was featured on the 2009 Spike TV's Video Game Trailers program. The preview was viewed favorably by 1Up.com. Prior to its release, the game was frequently referred to as a "WoW killer", and having the potential to challenge World of WarCraft's dominance of the MMORPG genre.

In early 2012, Rift adopted a free-to-play model (Rift Lite) with some restrictions for new and returning players up to level 20. In October 2012, for preparation of the expansion, Trion Worlds created a new server structure, where server capacity was "effectively doubled" and confined to a single wargroup. Currently there are 8 servers for North America and 10 servers for Europe.

In November 2012, the game's first expansion Storm Legion was released. This expansion tripled the land mass of Telara; raised the level cap to 60; introduced dimensions, a form of player-housing; and added additional soul choices to each class. The expansion received generally positive reviews from game critics. Trion Worlds announced that Rift would become a free-to-play game on June 12, 2013.

On June 12, 2013, Rift discontinued the subscription fee. Prior to that date, Rift required a monthly subscription fee for continued play, or purchase of prepaid game cards. Rift is now free to play up to the max level. There are however bonuses if the player chose to pay for "Patron" status.

On June 25, 2014 Trion Worlds announced the second expansion for Rift was in development. The expansion entitled Rift: Nightmare Tide was released October 22, 2014. The expansion added new content including a mini game called Minions, an expanded mentoring system, new zones including the Plane of Water, and raised the level cap to 65.

In March 2016, Rift was given support for multicore processors and the client was updated to 64 bit to increase performance.

On November 16, 2016, Rift released a third expansion Rift 4.0: Starfall Prophecy. This expansion added Celestial Lands including 5 new zones; raised the level cap to 70; introduced planar fragments, a system to upgrade fragments through Planar Infusion; and Legendary Powers.

On July 20, 2017, Rift released expansion Rift 4.2 Celestial Storm. This expansion added a new zone to Celestial Lands and four new Primalist Souls.

== Reception ==
Reception

Aggregate score
Aggregator	Score
Metacritic	84/100

Review scores
Publication	Score
Eurogamer	8/10
GamePro	4.5/5
GameRevolution	B
GameSpot	8/10
GameSpy	4/5
GamesRadar+	4/5
GameTrailers	8.2/10
GameZone	8.5/10
IGN	8.5/10
PC Gamer (US)	85%
PC PowerPlay	8/10
The Escapist	4/5

Awards
Publication	Award
Game Developers Conference	Best New Online Game and Best Online Technology
IGN	Best PC Persistent World/MMO Game of 2011
MMORPG.com	Game of the Year 2011
Joystiq	Most Improved MMO Since Launch 2012

Rift received "favorable" reviews according to the review aggregation website Metacritic.

PC Gamer said the game was "absolutely colossal, [and] Rift aims high and hits its mark, proving that there's room to grow within the traditional MMO format." GameSpy stated "it's worth noting that Rift has already emerged as Blizzard's best competition in years" and praised the dynamic world offered from rift events, but also questioned "how well its initially refreshing concepts will hold up after months of playtime." IGN stated that "soul building is very flexible and rifts are great fun" and that although "there's not a lot of originality" and "everything works exactly as it should," and concluding that "Telara is a worthy alternative to Azeroth for anyone looking to explore a new world."

In August 2011, Trion announced that 1 million users/players had played the game and by January 2012 it had earned $100 million in total revenue.

At the 2011 Game Developers Conference in Austin, Texas, Rift won awards for "Best New Online Game" and "Best Online Technology". IGN awarded Rift "Best PC Persistent World/MMO Game of 2011" calling it "the most bug-free and out-of-the-gate high-quality MMO ever created."

== Lawsuit ==
In 2010 the company Palladium Books sued Trion over the similarity of this game's title to Rifts, which was created in 1990.
