= Chicago 90 =

1989 video game

- Title screen
- Developer: Microïds
- Publisher: Microïds
- Designers: Cedric Cazal; Aurelien Murru
- Platforms: Amstrad CPC, Atari ST, Amiga, MS-DOS
- Release: 1989
- Genre: Racing
- Mode: Single-player

Chicago 90 is a racing video game developed and published by Microïds and was released in 1989 for the Amstrad CPC, Atari ST, Amiga and MS-DOS.

== Gameplay ==
Gameplay screenshot

Chicago 90 offers two game modes which in the first mode, the player play as a gangster and the second one as the police. Each two modes had opposing goals and different strategies. In the first mode, the player simply have to escape the city while avoiding being trapped by the police. In the second mode, the player can control six police cars by directly driving any of the six and issuing commands to the other five in an attempt to prevent the gangster from escaping the city. The game has three levels for the each two modes.

== Reception ==
Reception

Review scores
Publication	Score
Aktueller Software Markt	2.4/12
Jeuxvideo.com	17/20

== See also ==
- List of Microids games
