= The Smurfs: Mission Vileaf =

2021 video game

The Smurfs - Mission Vileaf
- Developer: OSome Studio
- Publisher: Microids
- Directors: Lionel Barranco; Mathieu Fremont
- Producers: Zoé Lemaître; Brice Pinquet
- Designers: Mathis Bressaud; Hubert de Buyer; Paul Barbier; Alicia Bruchon
- Programmers: Cédric Dodard; François Hautier
- Artists: Yohan Lardy; Emeline Oleszko; Dorian L'Héritier; Fallone Peyravernay
- Writers: Laura Garcin; Nicolas Pothier
- Composer: Valentin Lafort
- Engine: OEngine
- Platforms: Microsoft Windows; Nintendo Switch; PlayStation 4; Xbox One; Xbox Series X/S; PlayStation 5; Amazon Luna
- Release: Windows: WW: 26 October 2021; Switch, PS4, Xbox One: EU: 5 November 2021; NA: 16 November 2021; AU: 20 November 2021; AU: 24 November 2021 (PS4); Xbox Series X/S: NA: 16 November 2021; PlayStation 5: AU: 1 December 2021; EU: 2 December 2021; NA: 14 December 2021; Amazon Luna: WW: 4 November 2022
- Genres: Platform, adventure
- Modes: Single-player, multiplayer

The Smurfs - Mission Vileaf (French: Les Schtroumpfs - Mission Malfeuille) is a platform video game developed by OSome Studio and published by Microids, released on 26 October 2021. This video game was based on the Belgian animated series The Smurfs (and in turn in the Belgian comic book series of the same name, created by Peyo).

== Characters ==
- Papa Smurf
- Smurfette
- Hefty Smurf
- Brainy Smurf
- Chef Smurf
- Gargamel

== Development ==
On May 15, 2020 Microids announced a publishing deal with IMPS, the current worldwide licensors for The Smurfs, to make a new 3D game based on the franchise developed by OSome Studio. It was officially revealed on April 8, 2021, as The Smurfs - Mission Vileaf, and would be the first in an agreement to publish a series of Smurfs games over the next five years.

== Release ==
The game was originally slated to release simultaneously for Microsoft Windows, Nintendo Switch, PlayStation 4, and Xbox One on 26 October 2021 and PlayStation 5 and Xbox Series X/S in 2022, with special and collector's editions also being available for the first three consoles. On 14 October it was announced that the PlayStation 4 and Xbox One collector's editions were cancelled and the console versions were delayed until November. The Microsoft Windows version was released as originally planned on 26 October 2021 with the Nintendo Switch, PlayStation 4, Xbox One and versions released in November, and the PlayStation 5 and Xbox Series X/S released later that year. A version for Amazon Luna was made available on 4 November 2022.
