= Rising Lands =

1997 video game

- Developer: Microïds
- Publishers: R&P Electronic Media
- Designers: Thomas Zighem and Piotr Dabrowski
- Platform: Microsoft Windows
- Release: 1997
- Genre: Real Time Strategy
- Modes: Single player, multiplayer

Rising Lands is a fantasy-based real-time strategy computer game developed by Microïds, released in 1997.

Rising Lands takes place in a not too distant future, where earth has been devastated by a comet. The survivors have formed small tribes, and as the leader of one of these tribes, the player's mission is to guide their people to become rulers of the post-apocalyptic earth.

Gameplay is similar to most real-time strategy games. The player collects three different resources (food, stones and metal) and must utilize these to build new buildings, create armies, increase population and research new technologies.
