= Still Life 2 =

2009 video game

- European cover art
- Developer: Gameco Studios
- Publishers: FRA: Microids (Note: Distributed by CDV Software Entertainment); NA: Encore Software; UK: Iceberg Interactive
- Designer: Bruno Martin
- Series: Still Life
- Platforms: Microsoft Windows, Mac OS X
- Release: FRA: 14 May 2009; NA: 11 August 2009; UK: 19 February 2010
- Genre: Adventure
- Mode: Single-player

Still Life 2 is a 2009 adventure game developed by French company Gameco Studios and published by MC2 France under their Microïds label. It is a sequel to the 2005 game Still Life, and follows on from the characters and themes of 2003's Post Mortem.

== Gameplay ==
McPherson walking around the room in which the killer locks Hernandez

== Plot ==
The game follows FBI Agent Victoria McPherson in tracking down and stopping a serial killer known as the East Coast Killer. Gameplay has moved to the state of Maine. The game uses the same storytelling device of switching back and forth between two player characters as its predecessor. The second character is one of the killer's victims, journalist Paloma Hernandez, who has been covering the East Coast Killer's crimes, making the game switch between investigation and survival.

A short introduction to the game was posted on August 31, which covers the dates of October 2 and 3, 2008, in the game. It states that on the evening of October 2, the body of a missing person was found on the side of Highway 201, near Jackman. The video, which had been sent to the police and the media, identifies the killer as the East Coast Killer. McPherson sees Hernandez reporting on the killing on TV and later arranges a meeting. Hernandez is abducted, and she wakes up on October 3 in the killer's dilapidated house.

The East Coast Killer allowed Hernandez to call McPherson with clues to the location of the house to trap and kill her, a plan he had formed with an ex-marine and former FBI agent, Hawker, who had been dismissed when McPherson refused to back his claim that killing an innocent person had been justified at the time. Despite being successfully ambushed, McPherson managed to turn the tables and save herself and Hernandez, but not before nearly a dozen police officers and a rookie FBI agent were killed. Through a series of flashbacks, it was revealed that the Chicago Killer was Richard Valdez, Victoria's boyfriend from the previous game, who turned out to be the grandson of the man Gus was following through Prague.

== Development ==
There was controversy surrounding the first Still Life in its lack of an ending. Still Life ended without revealing the villain, setting up a finalé which, for some time, was not made. However, on 6 December 2007, Microïds announced the development of this game, which was released in April 2009. Development was started in June 2007 by GameCo. The game was also developed for Apple Macintosh computers.

In June 2008, a teaser video and screenshots were posted online. The video explores an abandoned mansion with a woman screaming in the distance. The end of the video showed a then-tentative release date of Fall 2008. A second trailer was released in November 2008.

On August 31, another set of screenshots of the cinematic and in-game views were released. The official game series website opened on September 19, the same day the release was pushed back from November 2008 to the first quarter of 2009. In late October, several high-resolution images of Vic McPherson and some in-game screenshots were posted.

On December 8, Microïds and GameCo launched a machinima contest, where fans created their own trailer for Still Life 2, using exclusive supplied material. The winner, out of over 120 entries, was announced on January 15, and the winner's and the runners-up's trailers were posted on the Still Life website. The winner will also have their name listed in the game credits.

In February and March 2009, more screenshots, an introduction video, and in-game footage of the game were released. The website also features videos of some of the makers of the game speculating on the identity of the killer.

== Release ==
A demo version of the game was released. This contained sections from early in the game in the killer's house.

The game was first released in Germany on 30 March 2009, followed by a release in France on 14 May 2009, where CDV Software Entertainment handled distribution. Releases for North America and the United Kingdom followed on 11 August 2009 and 19 February 2010, respectively. The game was published by Encore Software in North America and by Iceberg Interactive in the United Kingdom.

== Reception ==
Reception

Aggregate score
Aggregator	Score
Metacritic	67/100 (PC)

Review scores
Publication	Score
GameSpot	7/10
IGN	7.5/10

Still Life 2 received mixed reviews from critics. While the visuals are praised, many have complained about the gameplay, and does not live up to its predecessor.

IGN's Neilie Johnson praised the game, saying that, "Still Life 2 while remaining true to the spirit of the franchise, offering some interesting gameplay and wrapping the story up nicely, still fails to improve significantly on the previous title." GameSpot's Brett Todd concluded that "devotees of old-fashioned adventures, such as the ones Sierra used to make, should find something to enjoy in this detective story."

Stuart Young from AdventureGamers was critical of the game. Despite using 3D graphics as opposed to pre-rendered graphics like the original, the visuals surprisingly looks dated and visually unappealing. He also feels the controls and inventory system to be cumbersome. Alex Lucard from Diehard GameFAN finds the gameplay to be "worthless" with "poor" replayability, concluding that Still Life 2 is a "below average game."

== See also ==
- Dreamfall: The Longest Journey
- Evidence: The Last Ritual
- Overclocked: A History of Violence
- Sherlock Holmes: The Awakened
