= Superbike Challenge =

1987 video game

- Developer: MC2-Microids
- Publisher: Broderbund
- Platforms: Atari ST, Commodore 64, MS-DOS
- Release: 1987: ST, C64; 1988: MS-DOS
- Genre: Racing

Superbike Challenge is a motorcycle racing video game developed by MC2-Microids and published by Broderbund. It was released for Atari ST and Commodore 64 in 1987, then MS-DOS in 1988.

== Gameplay ==
Superbike Challenge is a game in which 12 courses (including Bugatti, Misano, Salzburgring, and Silverstone) are featured, with three difficulty levels.

== Reception ==
David M. Wilson and Johnny L. Wilson reviewed the game for Computer Gaming World, and stated that "If you would rather race over authentic courses, Broderbund's Superbike Challenge [...] features 12 authentic courses".
