= Still Life (video game) =

2005 video game

- Developer: Microids Canada
- Publishers: EU: MC2; NA: The Adventure Company
- Director: Desmond Oku
- Designer: Mathieu Larivière
- Writer: Mathieu Larivière
- Composer: Tom Salta
- Engine: Virtools
- Platforms: Microsoft Windows, Xbox
- Release: Microsoft Windows: NA: April 14, 2005; EU: June 3, 2005; Xbox: EU: June 3, 2005; NA: June 6, 2005
- Genre: Adventure
- Mode: Single-player

Still Life is a 2005 adventure game by Microïds. Still Life is a sequel to Post Mortem. A sequel, Still Life 2, was released in 2009. The game has since sold 240,000 copies worldwide.

A major theme throughout the game is art, especially the technique of still life that the game is named after. The game also uses a storytelling device of switching back and forth between two player characters.

The Xbox version had online support on Xbox Live with the "Live Aware" feature. Still Life is now supported on Insignia, a revival server for original Xbox games.

== Gameplay ==
Still Life is a point-and-click graphic adventure. Unlike its predecessor, which featured dialogue trees and first-person navigation, the player controls Victoria from a fixed third-person angle and conversations are linear in nature. A variety of puzzles must be completed to progress the narrative, which sometimes require backtracking to different stages that have been unlocked on the map.

The game features no hint system, nor an objective list, but the player may find clues on to what to do and where to go next by accessing documents obtained throughout the game in the menu. Also accessible is the inventory, which allows players to keep track of items obtained and examine them.

== Plot ==
FBI Special Agent Victoria McPherson is investigating a series of brutal murders in 2004 Chicago. While visiting her father for Christmas she discovers an old notebook that belonged to her grandfather, private investigator Gustav McPherson. Victoria is surprised to learn that Gus had been involved with investigating a very similar series of murders in 1920s Prague. The player alternates between these two characters as they work to hunt down what seems to be the same serial killer more than 70 years apart.

In both cases the murderer targets sex trade workers: street prostitutes in Prague, and employees of an exclusive Chicago massage parlor and S&M club called the Red Lantern. The killer or killers are disguised in a dark cloak, top hat, and silver mask.

Gus eventually identifies the man responsible for the Prague murders, but the killer escapes justice and relocates to America. Near the end of the game Victoria discovers that similar murders occurred in 1931 Chicago and later in 1956 Los Angeles.

The identity of the 2004 Chicago killer is never revealed. Victoria encounters him several times, but never sees behind his mask. She does not believe he is the same person as the Prague killer, but rather a younger person who has been influenced by the Prague killer in some way. At the climax of the game, Victoria manages to shoot the Chicago killer, but he plunges into the Chicago river and does not surface. As the game ends, the Chicago police are still searching the river for the killer's body. Victoria plans to travel to Los Angeles to learn more about the 1956 killings.

A controversy surrounding the game is its lack of an ending. Originally planned as the second of a trilogy, with Post Mortem as the first, Still Life ends without revealing the villain. The story was meant to continue in a third game, but it seemed unlikely that the finalé would ever be made, as part of the development arm of Microïds in Canada was bought out by Ubisoft. However, on December 6, 2007, Microïds announced the development of a sequel, Still Life 2, which was released in 2009. On September 19, 2008 a new Still Life series website was opened, covering the three games.

== Development ==
Still Life was made with Virtools applications; the same software as Post Mortem and some other Microïds games. The point and click gameplay is also based on the first two games in the Syberia franchise.

== Reception ==
Reception

Aggregate scores
Aggregator	Score
GameRankings	75.77% (PC); 68.68% (Xbox)
Metacritic	75/100 (PC); 70/100 (Xbox)

Review scores
Publication	Score
Eurogamer	5/10
GameSpot	6.7/10
IGN	7/10
X-Play	3/5
Just Adventure	A
Computer Games Magazine	4.5/5

According to Microïds, Still Life and its predecessor, Post Mortem, were commercial successes. The publisher reported combined global sales for the series above 500,000 units by September 2008. The worldwide sell-through of Still Life alone surpassed 240,000 units by May 2009.

Still Life received fairly favorable reviews from critics. Its Metacritic scores are 75/100 for PC and 70/100 for Xbox, based on reviews by respectively 27 and 29 critics. Its GameRankings scores are 75.77% for PC and 68.68% for Xbox, based on reviews by respectively 35 and 31 critics. David Clayman of IGN commented: "Still Life is an enjoyable albeit short diversion for fans of classic adventure games. As usual, this type of game controls better on a PC and character movement feels slow and clunky with the Xbox controller." Eurogamer's John Walker: "There's a lot that Still Life does well, but in the same way adventure games were doing things well ten years ago. There is therefore no excuse for it to not manage other basic, fundamental elements when rehashing these decade-old ideas." Shannon Hall of Just Adventure: "Anyone who loves a mystery and has an investigative mind will get many hours of pleasure from Still Life." Ryan Davis, writing for GameSpot: "Its slavish dedication to convention will scratch the methodical, cerebral itch all diehard adventure game fans have. As a genre exercise, though, it exerts little energy to draw in new players."

Still Life was a finalist for PC Gamer US's "Best Adventure Game 2005" award, which ultimately went to Indigo Prophecy.

In 2011, Adventure Gamers named Still Life the 20th-best adventure game ever released.

== See also ==
- Bone: Out from Boneville
- Sherlock Holmes: The Case of the Silver Earring
- The Moment of Silence
