= List of Fort Boyard video games =

As of May 2024, 16 video games focused on the Fort Boyard series have been released. The following table showcases the correspondent title, release date, publisher, developer and the platforms on which each game was released along with any other relevant information.

List of Fort Boyard video games
Title	Release details	Platform(s)			
Title	Release details	Microsoft	Nintendo	Sony	Other
Fort Boyard. Le défi	Released: 1995; Publisher: Microïds; Developer: Microïds	DOS			
Fort Boyard: la légende	Released: July, 1996; Publisher: Microïds; Developer: Microïds	DOS			
Fort Boyard. Millenium	Released: June 15, 2000; Publisher: Microïds; Developer: Microïds	Windows			
Fort Boyard	Released: September 6, 2001; Publisher: Microïds; Developer: Microïds		Game Boy Color		
Fort Boyard. Le Jeu	Released: June 16, 2006; Publisher: Mindscape; Developer: Mindscape	Windows			
Fort Boyard. Le Jeu	Released: June 22, 2007; Publisher: Mindscape; Developer: Mindscape	Windows	Nintendo DS		
Fort Boyard. Le Jeu	Released: June 19, 2008; Publisher: Mindscape; Developer: Mindscape		Nintendo DS Wii		
Fort Boyard	Released: July 5, 2008; Publisher: Gameloft; Developer: Gameloft				Mobile
Fort Boyard: Casse-tête & Enigmes	Released: June 26, 2009; Publisher: Mindscape; Developer: Dream On Studio		Nintendo DS		
Fort Boyard: Epreuves d'Adresse et de Rapidité	Released: June 26, 2009; Publisher: Mindscape; Developer: Dream On Studio		Nintendo DS		
Fort Boyard (Note: The game is no longer available due to the liquidation of Bulkypix. "En liquidation judiciaire, l'éditeur Bulkypix tire sa révérence". www.jeuxvideo.com (in French). 10 August 2016.)	Released: October 25, 2012; Publisher: Bulkypix; Developer: Bulkypix	Windows			Android IOS
Fort Boyard Run	Released: July 1, 2016; Publisher: France Télévisions; Developer: 3DDUO				Android IOS
Fort Boyard	Release: June 27, 2019; Publisher: Microïds; Developer: Appeal	Windows Xbox One	Nintendo Switch	PlayStation 4	MAC
FRA: Fort Boyard Nouvelle Édition; WW: Escape Game Fort Boyard	Release: June 25, 2020; Publisher: Microids; Developer: Appeal	Windows Xbox One	Nintendo Switch	PlayStation 4	MAC
FRA: Fort Boyard Nouvelle Édition Toujours Plus Fort !; WW: Escape Game Fort Boyard: New Edition (Note: "Toujours Plus Fort !" (or "New Edition") is sold as a DLC for the previous edition, Escape Game Fort Boyard.)	Release: June 24, 2021; Publisher: Microids; Developer: Balio Studio	Windows Xbox One	Nintendo Switch	PlayStation 4	MAC
FRA: Fort Boyard 2022; WW: Escape Game - Fort Boyard 2022	Release: June 23, 2022; Publisher: Microids; Developer: Balio Studio	Windows Xbox One	Nintendo Switch	PlayStation 4 PlayStation 5	MAC
FRA: Fort Boyard : Les Défis du Père Fouras; WW: Fortress Challenge: Fort Boyard	Release: June 27, 2024; Publisher: Microids; Developer: Breakfirst	Windows	Nintendo Switch	PlayStation 4 PlayStation 5	
