= Dream Chamber =

2013 video game

Dream Chamber Game
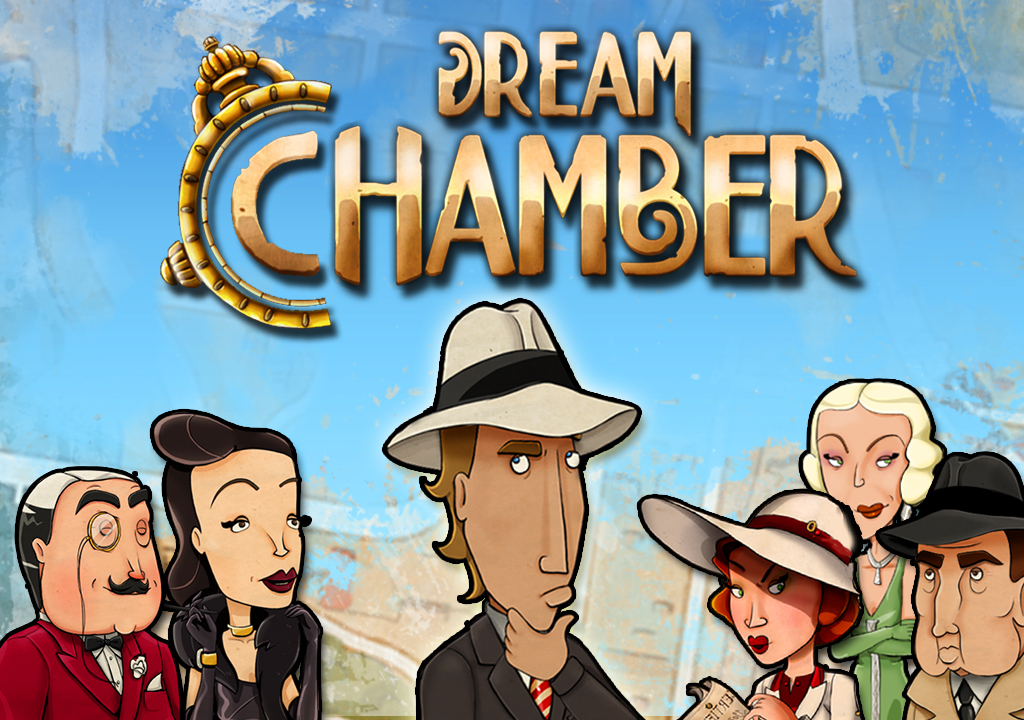
- Promotional artwork for Dream Chamber
- Developer: DarkWave Games
- Publisher: Anuman
- Engine: Unity
- Platforms: Microsoft Windows, Mac OS X, Android, iOS
- Release: WW: 24 October 2013
- Genres: Graphic adventure, adventure
- Mode: Single-player

Dream Chamber is a 2013 point-and-click adventure game, in the third person, for iPhone, iPad, Microsoft Windows, Mac, Android, developed by DarkWave Games and published by Anuman under their Microïds brand. The first episode, developed with Unity, was released worldwide via digital channels on 24 October 2013.

The game is set in the America of the Thirties, characterized by Prohibition and Great Depression. The player must assume the role of Charlie Chamber, a rich and bored inheritor spending his time with the social obligations of the smart society, as well as with his hobby of being a private detective. Although he is no professional, Charlie has an advantage: while dreaming he can go back to the places he visited, finding new clues which he had perceived only subliminally while awake. Moreover, while dreaming Charlie is able to face his own subconscious, embodied by Charles. The game goal is to solve the cases investigated by Charlie. Dream Chamber is intended as entertainment with an artistic value: the developer has declared that all the artwork has been hand-drawn and the soundtrack, a mix of swing and jazz pieces, is fully original, recorded in a studio.

The story, the setting and the style draw on the noir/hardboiled fiction genre, played in an ironic key, mostly through the features of the main character. Dream Chamber is dubbed in English and subtitled in English, Italian, French, Spanish and German.

== Synopsis ==
While attending the umpteenth opening evening of a museum (which, by the way, he has supported with a substantial donation), Charlie witnesses a theft. The victim is his girlfriend Teleta, who offers to hire him to retrieve the stolen goods. Despite the opposition of his uncle, the police inspector in charge of the case, Charlie accepts and, unknowingly, embarks (just for ennui) in the greatest adventure of his life. What looked like a trivial theft will become more complicated, involving Charlie's own life and that of his family since the death of his parents when he was a child.

== Gameplay ==
=== Goal ===
Dream Chamber is a point-and-click 2D graphic adventure, in the third person. It follows a well established pattern: the player moves through a number of surrounding environments by tapping on a screen or clicking with a mouse; by tapping or clicking it is also possible to interact with the play scenery. The objects picked up may be used by opening a hidden inventory and carrying them into the play scenery. The main goal of the game is to solve a case of theft, collecting clues and evidence and marking them down on a notebook (which automatically records every substantial progress in the game; the player can consult it at will). As is typical of adventure games, to reach the goal the player must talk to characters; collect, combine and use objects; solve puzzles; and complete minor games. Two recurrent gameplay elements mainly characterize Dream Chamber: the running of the dream and the battle-questioning.

=== The Dream ===
The running of the dream is such a primary matter as to be recalled in the name of the game. "Dream Chamber'", in fact, means "chamber of the dream" as well as "dream, Chamber" (the second name of the main character). By getting Charlie asleep, the player can go back to the places visited by him, enabling him to find new clues which he had perceived only subliminally during the day. Moreover, while dreaming Charlie will be able to visit Charles, his own subconscious, who can provide him with additional information.

=== The Battle-questioning ===
To get information from the game characters Charlie, who easily gets bored and has difficulty in focusing on cases, has overcome those issues by a trick: he envisages the questioning as an assault on a castle; if Charlie manages to conquer the castle he will obtain the information he needs. When the player needs information from a game character, he enters the "battle-questioning" interface: N cannonballs are available (one for each statement by Charlie) to shoot down the "castle" of the opponent, by hitting his weak points. Although not well understood by some reviewers, dynamics has to be taken into account among the game symbols: in the "battle-questioning" the point is not "what" one says, but "how" he says it; "how" is represented both by Charlie's tone and by the strength of the blow dealt to the "enemy fortress"; the "fortress" symbolizes the willpower of the opponent; the choice of the point of impact, in turn, represents the ability of striking the right points to get others do what we want.

== Reception ==
Reception

Aggregate score
Aggregator	Score
GameRankings	50% (iPhone); 45% (PC)

Review scores
Publication	Score
Softpedia	8/10
Wired	6.5/10
Pocket Gamer	5/10
Gamezebo	3/5
