= Evidence: The Last Report =

1996 video game

- DOS/Windows cover art
- Developer: Microïds
- Publishers: Microïds; PlayStation: EU: Microïds; JP: Shouei System
- Programmers: Nicolas Guerineau; Olivier Meimoun; Xavier-Claude Passeri
- Artists: Loïc Yvart; Ludovic Delcroix; Pierre Emmanuel Génin
- Writer: Pierre Rival
- Composers: Dimitri Bodiansky; Nicholas Varley
- Platforms: Microsoft Windows; MS-DOS; PlayStation
- Release: PC: EU: 1996; PlayStation: EU: March 1998; JP: 6 August 1998
- Genre: Adventure
- Mode: Single-player

Evidence: The Last Report is a 1996 adventure video game produced by Microids.

== Plot ==
Channel Z reporter Daniel Singer has become the prime suspect in the murder of his recent ex-girlfriend, Sarah Hopkins, with a limited amount of time to solve the crime and clear his name.

== Gameplay ==
The game is mostly a point and click adventure game, with some action sequences in genres such as shoot-em-up and beat-em-up.

== Release ==
Prior to its release on DOS, PlayStation and Windows, the game was originally in development and announced for the Atari Jaguar CD as one of the first upcoming titles for the add-on in 1994. It was originally slated to be published around the third quarter of 1995, however, this early version was never released for unknown reasons. A version of the game for the Philips CD-i was also in development and even previewed on French magazine CD Consoles, with plans to be published in 1995, but it was never released as well.
