= Nicky 2 =

1993 video game

- Developer(s): Microïds
- Publisher(s): Microïds
- Producer(s): Alain Lambin
- Programmer(s): Fabrice Decroix
- Artist(s): Pierre Fallard; Loïc Yvart
- Composer(s): Claude Abromont
- Platform(s): Amiga, Atari ST, MS-DOS, Windows, Mac OS X, mobile
- Release: 1992
- Genre(s): Platform game
- Mode(s): Single-player

Nicky 2, or Nicky II, is a platform game developed and originally released for the Amiga, Atari ST, and MS-DOS by Microïds in 1992. It is a sequel to 1992's Nicky Boom in which the boy Nicky returns to fight evil forces. Its iPhone version was released as Nicky Boom 2 in 2009.

== Gameplay ==
The player controls the protagonist Nicky who moves on his feet and on a flying goose. Nicky's main weapons against monsters are firecracker bombs, stones, and ultrasound whistles.

== Plot ==
At the end of the first game, the little hero boy Nicky has managed to defeat the evil witch Zoldrane the Sorceress and rescue his grandfather, and it seemed peace was restored to their forest. But after his toys get mysteriously scattered, rumors arrive that the witch had an equally wicked but even more powerful sister who is now causing chaos and preparing terrible revenge. And so his grandfather sends Nicky with a magic goose to seek out her lair. If Nicky manages to reach and defeat the end boss (a dragon), a volcano erupts and destroys the entire dark realm as he flies away on his goose.

== Reception ==
Nicky 2 received mixed ratings, including 67% from Amiga Computing, 72% from Amiga Format, 76% from Amiga Games, 68% from Amiga Joker, 58% from CU Amiga, D- from Amiga Game Zone, 77% from Génération 4, and 78% (Amiga) and 72% (Atari ST) from Joystick.
