= Dawntide =

- Developer(s): Working As Intended
- Designer(s): Martin Anward
- Composer(s): Dan Reynolds
- Engine: Gamebryo
- Platform(s): Microsoft Windows
- Release: Cancelled
- Genre(s): Massively multiplayer online role-playing game
- Mode(s): Multiplayer

Dawntide was a short-lived open world massively multiplayer online role-playing game developed by Working as Intended, an independent studio based in Copenhagen, Denmark. It used the Gamebryo engine from Emergent Game Technologies and CEGUI for UI. It featured a free-form advancement system.

The official launch date was October 1, 2011. On March 2, 2012, the developer announced on the game website that development was temporarily suspended due to financial issues but development never resumed.

The archipelago which makes up the Vynn territory in Cieve.

== Gameplay ==
In Cieve, the world of Dawntide, players are the driving element and the builders of a new civilization. "They can create their own cities, even forming nations with their own realistic societies. Factions have the opportunity to create and enforce their own laws and establish a government, as well as giving other players the opportunity to break those laws and overthrow those governments – at their own risk."

== Features ==
Features, implemented or otherwise, included: a free-form skill progression system, fully player-buildable towns, four playable races, full loot PvP, an interdependent crafting system, and a sailing and exploration mechanic.
