= Jack the Ripper (2004 video game) =

2004 video game

- Cover art
- Developer: Galilea Games
- Publishers: NA: The Adventure Company; EU: Microids
- Platform: Microsoft Windows
- Release: NA: January 29, 2004; EU: March 4, 2004
- Mode: Single-player

Jack the Ripper is an adventure video game, based upon the unidentified serial killer Jack the Ripper. The game was released for Microsoft Windows in 2004. It was developed by Galilea Games and published by The Adventure Company.

The game is set in New York in 1901, where James Palmer, a reporter of the newspaper New York Today, is investigating a set of murders similar to those of "Jack the Ripper" in Whitechapel thirteen years earlier; the murders turn out to be the work of the actual Ripper.

== Reception ==
Reception

Aggregate score
Aggregator	Score
Metacritic	58/100

Review scores
Publication	Score
Adventure Gamers	1.5/5
Computer Games Magazine	1/5
Computer Gaming World	2/5
GameSpot	5.2/10
GameSpy	3/5
GameZone	5.8/10
IGN	7.8/10
Jeuxvideo.com	13/20
PC Gamer (US)	61%

The game received "mixed" reviews according to the review aggregation website Metacritic.
