= Drift City =

2007 video game

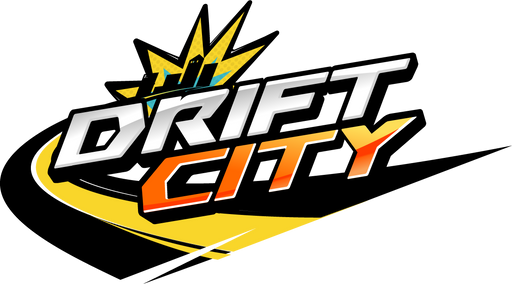
- Developer: NPluto
- Publisher: NPluto
- Composer: Peppertones
- Engine: Gamebryo
- Platform: Microsoft Windows
- Release: September 5, 2007
- Genres: MMO, racing
- Mode: Multiplayer

Drift City (also known as Skid Rush (스키드러쉬) in South Korea) is a massively multiplayer online Racing video game developed by NPluto and sponsored by several major automotive companies such as Chrysler, Dodge, Jeep, and U1 Technology. The standalone iOS and Android game (Drift City Mobile) was released on August 11, 2015, but has since shut down. On February 22, 2016, GamesCampus announced that the Drift City USA servers would close. On March 21, 2016, the USA server was shut down, although the Korean server is still playable. On April 2, 2021, Arario announced that the Drift City Evolution server would be closing. On May 1, 2021, the Japanese server closed and the only remaining official server is the Korean server, hosted by Masangsoft.

== Gameplay ==
A screenshot of several players at Cras City in Drift City.

Drift City is a cel-shaded racing video game which includes single-player (missions) and multi-player modes (team car racing, PVP) to play. The currency earned (named Mito) while playing can be spent on customizing owned cars, collecting new parts or buying some new rides. A large majority of missions involves reaching targets, occasionally with a time or crash limit, while following the arrow, similar to Crazy Taxi. Successfully completing a mission or a race gives a certain number of experience points and Mito. As an arcade-style racer, the physics make game feel faster and less prone to hazards.

There are 9 different types of cars, sorted by their power and overall quality. Before some of these can be unlocked, it is necessary to meet level requirements. At a certain point of time, the players will be informed of the location of a fugitive HUV that is near. If that request is accepted, the car chase starts with a time limit where the goal is to hit the runaway car until durability reaches zero.

At any time, the player can slide/drift the car that is controlled, which allows taking corners as quickly as possible. The game will reward risks while driving by filling up the boost meter, which can be used for super speed. Combos are performed when players drive dangerously, such as doing so while in a traffic, opposite lane, or drifting.

What lies beneath the community aspect of Drift City are Crews that can be joined, where the players can chat, participate in single or team duels, or share missions with other people around. There is a central hub which includes things like the Battle Zone and various shops.

== Plot ==
In the spring of 2007, a substance called Mitron was discovered on an island the size of Jeju Island in the middle of the North Pacific Ocean. Mitron is humanity's last resource in an age of depleting oil, and it is a near-perfect solid fuel source that is highly efficient, non-polluting, and produces no radioactive byproducts when fed into a fusion reactor. A U.S. university professor has estimated the value of Mitron energy buried on the uninhabited island the size of Jeju Island at $4 billion (KRW 4.51 trillion) per metric ton, with about 1 million metric tons of Mitron buried on the island.

An announcement is made that the OECD countries will build a massive development on the southern part of the island and then mine Mitron, declaring the entire island a Special Administrative Region under the jurisdiction of the OMD government. The OMD government then builds an international city called Moon Palace on the uninhabited island. Moon Palace was the only place in the world where Mitron energy could be used legally, making it far more abundant than any other part of the world, and many people in the world wanted to live there.

Moon Palace continued to evolve and its population grew. So, in 2014, five years after Moon Palace was built, the OMD government plans to build another city, Koinonia, next to Moon Palace.

But as technology advances, so does crime. For some reason, Moon Palace has been plagued with crimes. The majority of crimes in Moon Palace are committed by vehicles, which appear out of nowhere and speed through the city, terrorizing people on the street and paralyzing traffic. The OMD officers called these criminal vehicles HUVs (High-tech Unmanned Vehicles) because when they were apprehended, they were equipped with unmanned systems that were not driven by humans, and the level of technology was high. HUVs are faster than regular cars and have better driving skills, so regular cars can't even approach them.

A special project is being carried out to suppress the heavy traffic caused by HUVs and to find the source of the HUVs. The special project is to recruit talented drivers from all over the world to become drivers against HUVs, and advertise a large reward for drivers who catch HUVs, so said drivers apply to become OMD drivers.

The protagonist, one of the drivers who applied to be an OMD driver to make money, ends up at Moon Palace. The protagonist meets Yan on a mission and becomes a close colleague, and later meets Yuki and Mr. H, and his network begins to grow.

== Development and release ==
Drift City was developed by NHN Game Development Center and published by NHN. Peppertones contributed the soundtrack.
