= 9 Elefants =

2014 video game

- Developer(s): Microids
- Publisher(s): Anuman
- Platform(s): iOS, Android
- Release: April 24, 2014
- Genre(s): Puzzle
- Mode(s): Single-player

9 Elefants is a 2014 puzzle game developed by the French studio Microids and published by Anuman. It was released on April 24, 2014, for iOS and Android and has been met with a negative reception.

== Gameplay and release ==
The player has to solve trivia questions and logic puzzles to advance through the game's nine chapters.

In 9 Elefants, the player assumes the role of a daughter named Laura, whose professor is kidnapped. With her cat, she tries to track down the perpetrator. Throughout the game's nine chapters, the player must answer trivia questions to earn collectibles that can be exchanged for a boss fight. The game was released for iOS and Android on April 24, 2014.

== Reception ==
Reception

Aggregate score
Aggregator	Score
Metacritic	40/100

Review scores
Publication	Score
Adventure Gamers	2/5
Jeuxvideo.com	7/20
MacLife	1.5/5
Pocket Gamer	2/5

On Metacritic, the game has a "generally unfavorable" rating of 40/100 based on four critics.

Multiple reviewers gave negative scores.
