= War and Peace: 1796–1815 =

2002 video game

- European cover art
- Developer(s): Microïds
- Publisher(s): Microïds
- Composer(s): Inon Zur
- Platform(s): Windows
- Release: NA: August 29, 2002; EU: November 21, 2002
- Genre(s): Strategy; Simulation
- Mode(s): Single-player

War and Peace: 1796–1815 is a singleplayer strategic-based war video game released in 2002. It was developed by Microïds for Microsoft Windows based PCs.

The game is fully modelled in 3D and there are 183 towns to capture during the game. There are six playable nations, and 30 non-playable neutral nations.
