= Post Mortem (video game) =

2002 murder mystery adventure video game

- European cover art
- Developer: Microids
- Publishers: EU: Microids; NA: The Adventure Company DreamCatcher Interactive
- Designer: Stéphane Brochu
- Engine: Virtools
- Platform: Windows
- Release: FRA: November 13, 2002; NA: February 28, 2003; EU: March 7, 2003
- Genre: Adventure
- Mode: Single-player

Post Mortem is a murder mystery adventure game by Microids, released in 2002. Its sequels are Still Life and Still Life 2. The game was also released in French, Italian, German and Spanish.

== Gameplay ==
In-game screenshot showing the game's main character, Gustav McPherson, in the bar at the Alambic Bistro.

Post Mortem uses a first-person player view and a point and click user interface, using only the mouse for control. This slightly differs in its sequel, Still Life, however as it is a third person game.

Different cursors appear over portions of the screen to show the player what will happen when it is clicked on.

Gus' notebook is used to collate both the menu system of the game and the place to view documents obtained within the game.

== Development history ==
Microids developed and completed Post Mortem in ten months using Virtools Dev. An in-house team of 27 people created the game. This included 8 graphic artists, 5 animators and 6 programmers. To ensure the game had variety and no linear storyline, Microïds used a software called "Natural Dialog Engine". Post Mortem was later followed by a spin-off series, Still Life, which has currently produced two games. On September 19, 2008 a new Still Life series website was opened, covering the three games.

== Reception ==
Reception

Aggregate score
| Aggregator | Score |
|---|---|
| Metacritic | 71/100 |

Review scores
| Publication | Score |
|---|---|
| Adventure Gamers | 2/5 |
| Computer Gaming World | 3/5 |
| EP Daily | 6.5/10 |
| GameRevolution | C− |
| GameSpot | 6.7/10 |
| GameSpy | 4/5 |
| Gamezebo | 70/100 |
| GameZone | 7.3/10 |
| IGN | 7.9/10 |
| PC Gamer (US) | 40% |
| X-Play | 3/5 |
| The Cincinnati Enquirer | 3.5/4 |

The game received "average" reviews according to the review aggregation website Metacritic. The Cincinnati Enquirer gave it a favorable review about a month before the game was released Stateside.

According to Microïds, the game and its successor, Still Life, were commercial successes. The publisher reported combined global sales for the series above 500,000 units by September 2008.
