= End of Nations =

2012 video game

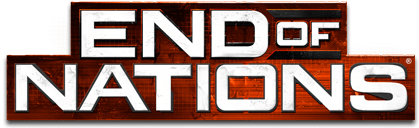
- Developer: Trion Worlds
- Publisher: Trion Worlds
- Composer: Frank Klepacki
- Platform: Microsoft Windows
- Release: Cancelled
- Genre: Multiplayer online battle arena
- Modes: Single-player, multiplayer

End of Nations is an unreleased multiplayer online battle arena video game for Microsoft Windows. It was being developed in-house by Trion Worlds, combining the aesthetics and tone of the sci-fi genre and put it in a multiplayer online battle arena (MOBA) game. It is presumed cancelled.

== Gameplay ==
End of Nations was initially revealed in 2010 as a MMORTS (Massively multiplayer online real-time strategy game), but it was later developed into a MOBA.

== Plot ==
Pierre Frenay was a member of the French Resistance during World War II who saw the United Nations (UN) and the world governments as useless in preventing conflict and suffering. As such, he founded a secret organization to undermine and destabilize the governments of the world, which operated within the UN itself. Through terrorist attacks, assassinations, and orchestrated disasters, the organization hoped to discredit and dismantle the governments of the world so that it could bring all of the countries, their territories, and their people, under their fold.

We are introduced to the universe of End of Nations with a synopsis of the events leading up to the present conflict. 50 years into the future, a worldwide economic crisis and collapse has resulted in a cascade of shortages and conflicts. This coincided with the failure and dissolution of almost all of the world's governments. As the world descended into anarchy, a savior emerged. The United Nations stepped in to restore order through aid and military force. The public reaction to this was initially enthusiastic. As the governments of the world had failed, the United Nations, now renamed the Order of Nations (ON), became the sole government of the world. To the shock and horror of the populace, this new government began to abduct people in the middle of the night and execute its citizens for asking questions. As a result of this oppression, resistance movements emerged.

When the game begins, the resistance has been underway for quite some time. The Liberation Front, led by American war hero General Alec Chase, and the Shadow Revolution, led by former Order of Nations assassin Monkh Erdene, are part of the Coalition, an alliance against the Order of Nations. The commander controls part of the Coalition forces sent to assault the Typhoon Cannon, a massive artillery turret, at the Order of Nations base at Widow's Wall. The leader of the Order of Nations, General Sevastian Korvus, is also present, residing within the Typhoon Cannon. The assault on the Typhoon Cannon is successful. The cannon is destroyed and Korvus is killed. Yet, the allies bicker. With the destruction and collapse of the Typhoon Cannon, there is now a giant breach in Widow's Wall. Alec Chase of the Liberation front wishes to advance further into the base, but Monhk Erdene of the Shadow Revolution counters that their coalition has captured the Siege Cortex and that further advance into the base is not part of the mission. Land battleships from the Order of Nations, known as Assault Panzers, approach from both sides of the breach outside the wall. General Chase asks Monkh to engage the enemy forces so that he can assault the inner base. Monkh apologizes to Chase, reiterates that it was not part of the mission, and the Shadow Revolution forces withdraw. Outflanked and without sufficient support, General Chase is forced to withdraw as well, sustaining casualties in the process. Allies no more, the Liberation Front and Shadow Revolution continue to fight the Order of Nations while also fighting and sabotaging each other for control of territories and influence over populaces. And thus the stage was set for further conflicts between the three factions.

== Factions ==
There are three factions in End of Nations. Two of those are playable; the Liberation Front and the Shadow Revolution. The third faction is the unplayable computer controlled Order of Nations, the main antagonist of the game.

- Liberation Front – Increasing chaos led the world leaders to give up control to the Order. The Lord Chancellor of England, Mary Dickinson, refused to give up control of her people. She decided to fight against this regime, and began distributing a digital pamphlet codenamed "The Sentinel". She began to coordinate these dissidents. The Liberation Front believes that people should be free to elect their leaders and form their own governments. They will go to the grave to fight for this right. The Liberation Front has two classes: Spartan and Patriot, each with their own advantages and special abilities. The Spartan is all about heavy armor and point defense. The Patriot class is more of a support class, and with their support powers, they are able to greatly influence the battlefield.
- Shadow Revolution – A few people believe that the new regime's oppression of the people was far too violent. These dissidents were killed, including Donald Poole who oversaw the rule of Eastern Europe. His son, Robert Poole, and Sabal Dasgupta came together and secretly formed an army of their own known as the Shadow Revolution. As former members of the Order of Nations, they arm themselves with weapons and technology stolen from their former organization, along with knowledge of the inner workings of the Order. They are trying to realize Pierre Frenay's vision of a firm but benevolent rule. The Shadow Revolution has two classes, the Wraith and Phantom classes, each having their own advantages, and special abilities. The Wraith class is all about fast hit-and-run tactics. The Phantom class is all about stealth tactics and ambushes.
- Order of Nations – Perverted from one man’s dream of a peaceful world government, the Order of Nations rules the globe with violence, oppressing the masses and crushing any in their path. The Order possesses extremely advanced weapons systems, developed using siphoned off money and resources, in hopes of creating an army dedicated to establish a one world order. This army was advanced and powerful enough to overwhelm the militaries of the world's nations and take control with ease. Order of Nations is the AI controlled, third faction in End of Nations. Order of Nations units can be seen in most PvE and some PvP maps. Order of Nations units and buildings have darker color scheme than Liberation Front or Shadow Revolution.

== Development ==
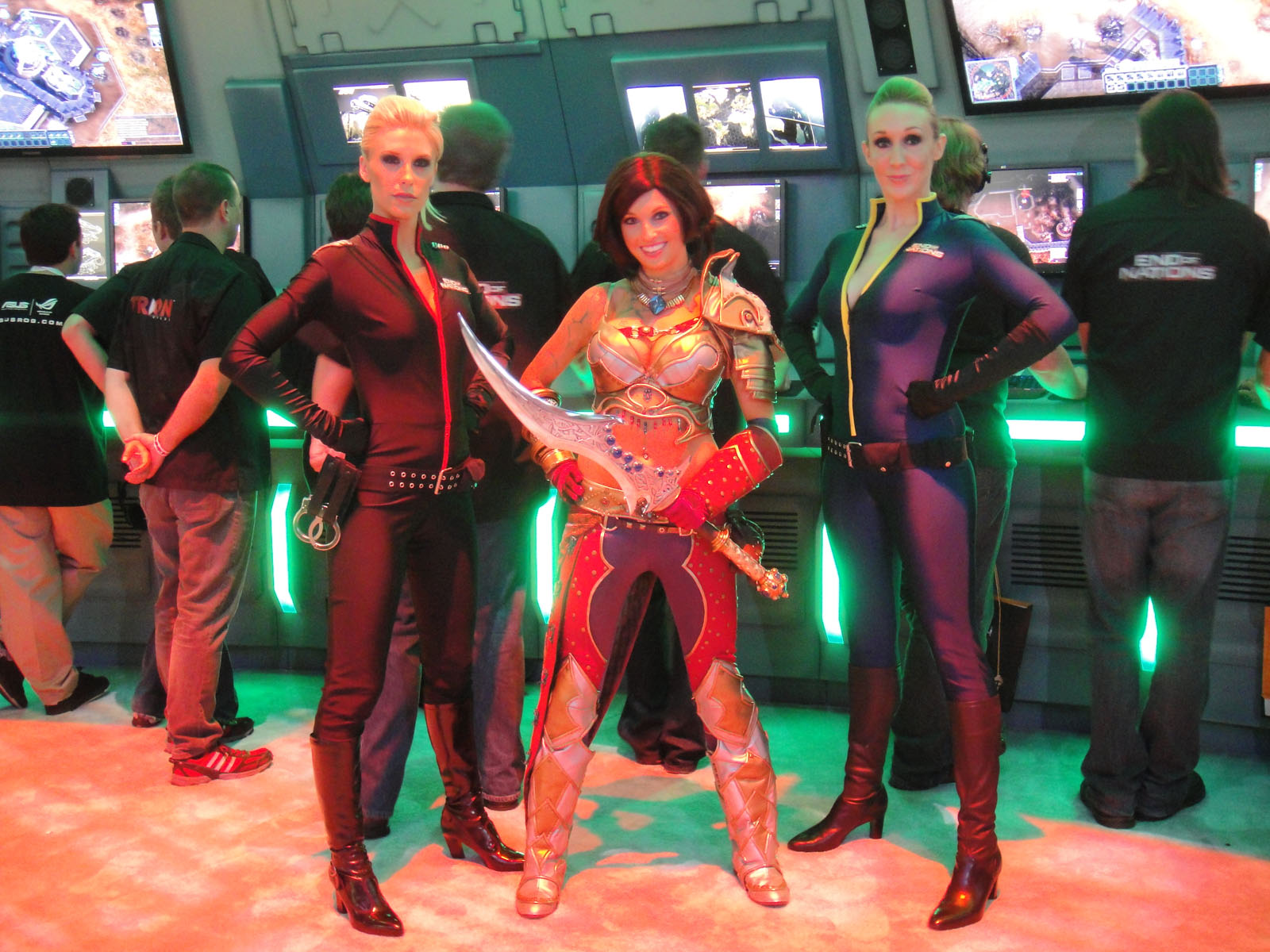
Promotion at E3 2011

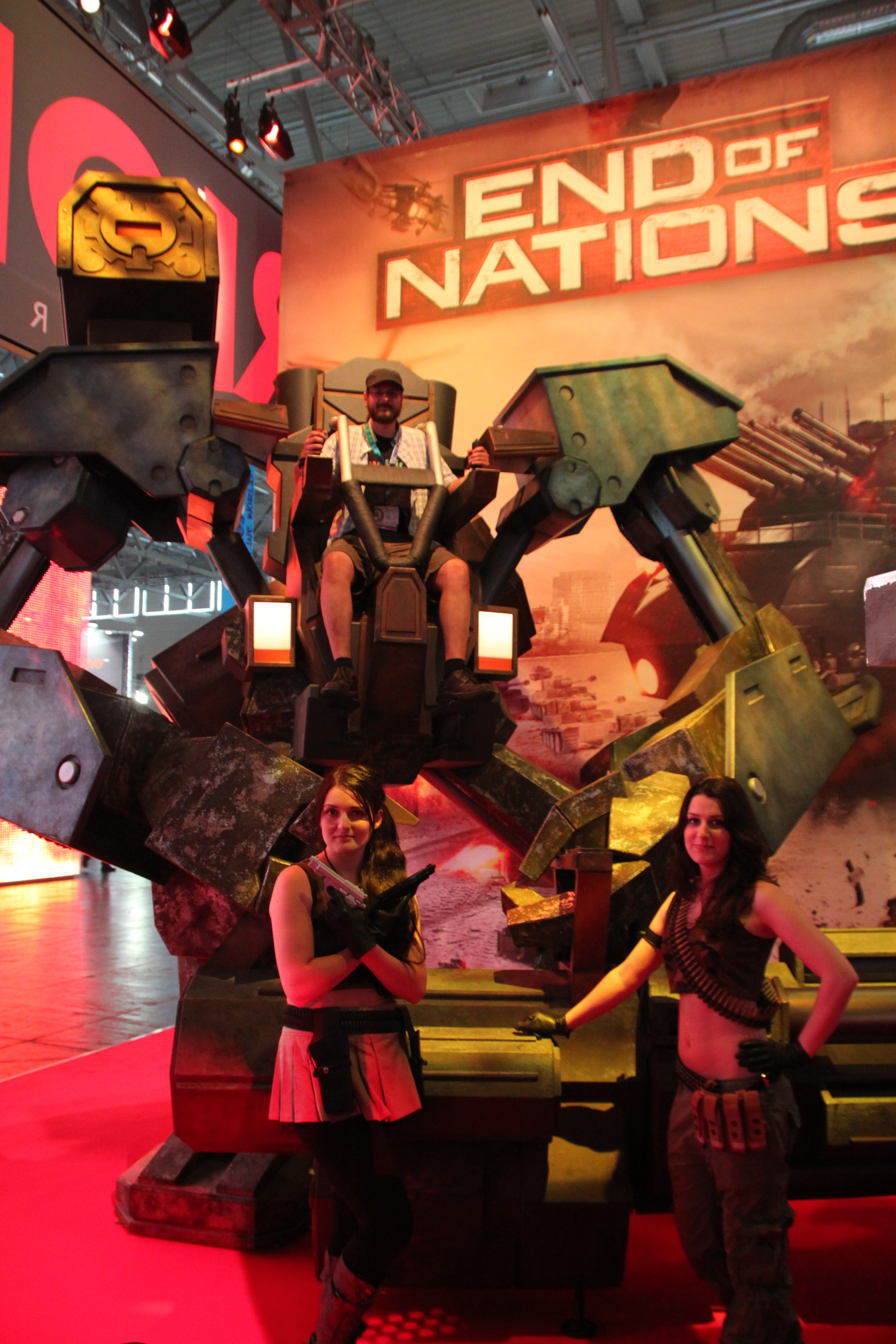
Promotion at Gamescom 2012

Alpha test begun on June 7, 2011. On August 11, 2011, it was reported that the game will be released as a free-to-play title, as well as having a traditional subscriber option. On July 18, 2013, it was announced that the game will be changed from a MMORTS to a MOBA. Alpha test begun once again on August 8, 2013 as a reworked game.

As of November 2013, following a restructuring at Trion Worlds, it appears that the development of End of Nations is in limbo. No new information nor patches have been provided to alpha testers since August 2013, and there have been no activity by the development team in the alpha forums since this time. On March 2, 2014, all mentions of End of Nations were removed from Trion's website.
