= Empire of the Ants (2024 video game) =

- Developer: Tower Five
- Publisher: Microids
- Engine: Unreal Engine 5.4
- Platforms: Microsoft Windows; PlayStation 5; Xbox Series X/S
- Release: November 7, 2024
- Genre: Real-time strategy
- Modes: Single Player; Multiplayer

Empire of the Ants is a 2024 real-time strategy video game developed by Tower Five and published by Microids. Utilizing the Unreal 5 engine to produce photorealistic visuals, it is a remake of the 2000 game of the same name, also developed by Microids. The game was released on November 7, 2024 for PC, PlayStation 5, and Xbox Series X|S platforms. As with its predecessor, the game follows the perspective of an ant colony interacting with the surrounding natural environment, fending off threats and collecting resources to survive.

The game received mixed to positive reviews from critics, with praise directed at the graphics quality and visuals while criticizing the overly simplistic gameplay, exploration, and level design.

== Gameplay ==
Empire of the Ants is a real-time strategy game with elements of adventure and platformer games. The game is played from the third-person perspective of ant #103,683, a member of a red ant colony emerging from hibernation in the Fontainebleau Forest. It features a single player campaign and multiplayer modes against up to 2 other players or CPU opponents. Single-player levels vary in type, with some oriented towards exploration and hunting, while others involve more conventional RTS battles against termites and other rival insect communities. The player navigates throughout forested environments to meet fellow ants, command units, and build structures to complete the level objectives.

== Reception ==
Reception

Aggregate scores
Aggregator	Score
Metacritic	(PC) 72/200 (PS5) 77/100 (Xbox) 80/100
OpenCritic	57% recommend

According to the review aggregation website Metacritic, the PlayStation 5 and Xbox Series X versions of Empire of the Ants both received generally favorable reviews from critics, while the PC version received "mixed or average" reviews. Fellow review aggregator OpenCritic assessed that the game received fair approval, being recommended by 57% of critics.

IGN rated the single player campaign a 3/10, citing a shallow gameplay loop, underwhelming level design and poor AI, though noting the multiplayer component had greater depth and scored at 6/10. PC Gamer felt that the exploration and small-scale RTS gameplay did not blend but found the art style and visuals redeeming enough to enjoy.

In 2025, Empire of the Ants won the Pégases Award for Visual Excellence and was nominated for Best Independent Video Game.
