= Trion Worlds =

American video game developer

- Formerly: Trion World Network, Inc. (2006–2010); Trion Worlds, Inc. (2010–2018)
- Type: Subsidiary
- Industry: Video games
- Founded: January 10, 2006; 20 years ago
- Founders: Lars Buttler; Jon Van Caneghem
- Fate: Acquired by gamigo; defunct October 26, 2018 as independent company
- Headquarters: Redwood City, California, U.S.
- Number of locations: 2 offices (2017)
- Area served: Worldwide
- Key people: Scott Hartsman (CEO)
- Products: Rift; ArcheAge; Defiance; Atlas Reactor; Trove
- Owner: gamigo AG
- Parent: gamigo Inc
- Website: trionworlds.com

Trion Worlds was an American video game developer. It focused primarily on MMOs, particularly of the MMORPG and MMORTS genres. The company was founded in 2006 by Lars Buttler and Jon Van Caneghem, who had each previously worked for NCSoft and left in 2009 to join Electronic Arts.

== History ==
The company was founded as Trion World Network, Inc in 2006 by Lars Buttler, previously serving as Vice President for Global Online at major American video game publisher EA, and Jon Van Canegham, previously serving as Executive Producer at South Korean online video game company NCSoft. The two left their respective jobs to pursue the founding of a company that could "define a generation of interactive entertainment by fundamentally revolutionizing the way games are created, played and distributed."

After the founding, the company immediately began development on the Trion Platform, a server technology through which it claims both Trion and "external partners" will deliver games, and is claimed to be less heavily client-based and enable large-scale battles.

Trion also begun early development on their first MMORPG, then titled Heroes of Telara, which would go on to be renamed Rift: Planes of Telara, until finally being released as Rift in March 2011.

In 2011, in addition to the renaming of Heroes of Telara to Rift: Planes of Telara, Trion World Network, Inc. renamed itself as Trion Worlds, Inc.

In October 22, 2018, Trion Worlds was acquired by Gamigo.

Trion Worlds disbanded on October 26, 2018.

== Products ==
=== Rift ===
In 2006, Trion began development on Heroes of Telara (now known simply as Rift), an MMORPG. The game would go on to undergo extensive alpha testing, with beta testing finalizing the stress test portion of development. Trion Worlds CEO Lars Buttler has stated that Rift has a budget of "over US$50 million". The game was officially released in 2011 in the United States on March 1, Australia on March 2 and throughout Europe on March 4.

=== Defiance ===
In 2010, Trion and Syfy announced a deal in which a video game and related television series would be produced. In 2011, the game was revealed to be Defiance, an MMO open world shooter, and released for Microsoft Windows, Steam, PlayStation 3 and Xbox 360 on April 2, 2013. The official press release states that the game "interconnects with a global television program by Syfy, cable’s premier imagination-based entertainment channel. The first live gameplay demo of Trion and Syfy’s visionary concept debuted at the annual industry event (E3), and was announced as the "first interconnect video game and television series."

=== End of Nations ===
End of Nations, originally a free-to-play MMORTS video game developed by Petroglyph Games. Later development switched to in house at Trion Worlds and changed genre to a MOBA RTS hybrid. End of Nations was planned for a simultaneous North American and European release. It was in the alpha phase of development when it was put on indefinite hold in November 2013.

=== Archeage ===
Trion acquired the western markets publishing license for ArcheAge. Archeage, following beta periods in South Korea and Russia, was released on September 16, 2014, for Europe and North America.

=== Trove ===
Released on July 9, 2015, Trove is a voxel-based MMORPG developed and published by Trion Worlds. There are 17 playable classes, each with unique play styles and their own themed biome. A large amount of content (including dungeons, lairs, and equipment) is player-submitted. Adventure worlds are randomly generated on spawn, with dungeons scattered throughout various biomes. Players can join clubs to access a club world where building progress is saved and can be protected from non-club members.

=== Devilian ===
On June 30, 2015, Trion announced they were publishing South Korea’s Ginno Games' Devilian in Europe and North America. Devilian is a fantasy MMO where players play a half-devil known as a Devilian which has two forms — a normal characters and a devil form. On March 5th 2018 Devilian was shut down permanently in North America and Europe.

=== Atlas Reactor ===
At PAX Prime 2015, Trion Worlds announced Atlas Reactor, a multiplayer turn-based tactics game set in the future. It is a team-based game in which a team of players compete against another team in simultaneous turns. Atlas Reactor launched on October 4, 2016, and became the first game to be integrated with Discord, allowing players to control the Discord client while in-game.

== Investors and partners ==
Trion has multiple investors, including The Time Warner Investments Group, Comcast Ventures, Bertelsman Digital Media Investments, Rustic Canyon Partners, Trinity Ventures and DCM, with HP listed on their website as a "strategic partner". In addition, Trion has also partnered with American video game developer Petroglyph Games, American cable television channel Syfy, and video game publishers Sony Computer Entertainment and Ubisoft.

In October 2018 Trion was acquired by German online games publisher, Gamigo.
