= Empire of the Ants (2000 video game) =

2000 video game

- European cover art
- Developer: Microïds
- Publishers: EU: Microïds; NA: Strategy First
- Designers: Julien Marty; Pascal Mory; Xavier-Claude Passeri; Bernard Werber
- Programmer: Vincent L'Hermite
- Composer: Nicolas Varley
- Platform: Windows
- Release: EU: April 20, 2000; NA: July 17, 2001
- Genre: Strategy
- Mode: Multiplayer

Empire of the Ants (known in France as Les Fourmis) is a video game released in 2000, developed by Microïds, and based on a novel of the same name written by Bernard Werber.

A new version of the game by Microids and Tower Five, powered by Unreal Engine 5, was released on PC, PlayStation 5 and Xbox Series on November 7, 2024.

== Gameplay ==
The game is playable on a network with up to 8 players, and the game contains more than 60 species of insects and different animals. Requiring strategy and management, it is set in the combative world of ants and their anthills.

== Reception ==
Reception

Aggregate score
Aggregator	Score
Metacritic	59/100

Review scores
Publication	Score
Computer Gaming World	3.5/5
GameSpot	5.6/10
GameSpy	75%
GameZone	8/10
IGN	6/10
PC Gamer (UK)	62%
PC Gamer (US)	56%
PC Zone	54%

The game received "mixed or average" reviews, according to the review aggregation website Metacritic. Dan Adams, in reviewing the game for IGN, concluded that the game has the potential but criticized the lack of characters and poor graphics.
