= Highway Patrol 2 =

1991 video game

- Developer: Microids
- Publisher: Microids
- Designers: Cedric Cazal; David Demaret
- Platforms: Atari ST, Amiga, MS-DOS
- Release: 1991
- Genre: Racing
- Mode: Single-player

Highway Patrol 2 (shown on the title screen as Highway Patrol II) is a racing video game published by Microïds in 1991 for Atari ST, Amiga, and MS-DOS compatible operating systems. The player is a police officer trying to capture criminals before they reach the border of the state. The game begins with choosing a target, each one with different rewards: the tougher the criminal, the higher the reward will be. The game is played in a first-person view, with a map and a compass to help in locating the criminal. To arrest him, players may choose to use the soft way (siren), or the hard way (shotgun).

== Screenshots ==
Title screen with "II" instead of "2".

On the road

Prepare to chase criminals
