= Tennis Masters Series (video game) =

2001 video game

- Developer: Microids Canada
- Publisher: Microids
- Engine: NetImmerse
- Platform: Windows
- Release: EU: November 5, 2001; NA: November 15, 2001
- Genre: Sports
- Mode: Single-player

Tennis Masters Series is a 2001 tennis video game from Microids.

== Gameplay ==
The Tennis Masters Series game simulates the ATP tour, in which players can choose from 67 fictional athletes to compete in exhibition matches, full seasons, or LAN-based multiplayer. The tour spans nine major events—from Indian Wells and Miami to Monte Carlo, Rome, Hamburg, Montreal, Cincinnati, Stuttgart, and Paris—with localized commentary in French for certain venues and a British announcer elsewhere. On the court, the game offers a full range of shot types—flat, topspin, backspin serves, lobs, and positional play. Baseliners grind rallies while net rushers charge forward, reflecting archetypal tennis styles. Matches in season mode must be played in full, though exhibition settings allow customization of sets and games. Multiplayer supports up to four players via LAN.

== Development ==
Tennis Masters Series uses the NetImmerse game engine. It went gold on October 10, 2001. The development team was composed of twenty-one people: one project manager, one lead game designer, one lead programmer, four artists, three animators, ten programmers and one designer.

== Reception ==
Reception

Review scores
Publication	Score
All Game Guide	2/5/5
Computer Gaming World	2/5
GameSpot	5.9/10
IGN	6.5/10
Jeuxvideo	14/20
The Guardian	4/5

GameSpot gave Tennis Masters Series a score of 5.9 out of 10' stating: "Tennis Master Series gets the basics right, but for $45, it should do a lot more than that".

IGN said "All in all, Tennis Masters Series is a frustrating tennis sim that has its share of entertaining moments".
