= Speed Demons (video game) =

1999 video game

- Developer: EMG
- Publisher: Microïds
- Platform: Windows PC
- Release: 1999
- Genre: Racing
- Modes: Single-player, multiplayer

Speed Demons is a racing video game released in 1999. The game was developed and published by Microïds.

The game has 6 vehicles with possible localised damage, with three possible points of view. The game can be played as single player, 2 player split-screen, or by up to 6 players on a network. There are 10 circuits in varying locations, such as American motorways, on the sides of a volcano during its eruption and snow-covered ski slopes.

== Reception ==
Reception

Review score
Publication	Score
The Sydney Morning Herald	3.5/5
