= Subject 13 (video game) =

2015 video game

- Developer: Microids
- Publisher: Microids
- Engine: Unity
- Platforms: Microsoft Windows, Mac OS, PlayStation 4, Xbox One
- Release: Windows, macOS: WW: May 28, 2015; PS4: WW: December 16, 2016; XOne: WW: December 20, 2016
- Genre: Point-and-click adventure
- Mode: Single-player

Subject 13 is a point-and-click adventure developed and published by Microids in 2015 for Microsoft Windows and Mac OS. In 2016, the game was ported to the PlayStation 4 and Xbox One.

== Plot ==
The physicist Franklin Fargo tries to commit suicide out of grief over the death of his fiancée, for which he was partly responsible, by plunging his car into a lake. He loses consciousness and comes to in an unknown capsule full of apparatuses. There, he is greeted by a mechanical voice as "Subject 13" and is given various mental tasks by it. It soon turns out that Fargo is in a scientific research station. The station is deserted; the events before Fargo's arrival are only revealed to him through tape recordings of the researchers, which he gradually finds scattered around the station. As the game progresses, Fargo encounters a female ghost inside the station, visually resembling his fiancée Sophie, who warns him of the task-setting mechanical voice, and explores the isolated island formerly inhabited by the Hunapus nature tribe on which the station is located. It turns out that Fargo is not the first person to face the tasks of the mechanical voice, and that it is the Hunapo deity Ah Cizin who tests the intelligence of its "test objects" in order to subsequently absorb the most outstanding among them.

== Gameplay ==
Subject 13 is for the most part a 2.5D adventure. Characters created as three-dimensional character models move in front of hand-drawn, partially animated 2D backdrops. Using the mouse, the player can move his character through the locations and initiate actions with the mouse buttons that let the game character interact with his environment. Fargo can thus find items, apply them to the environment or other objects, and communicate with NPCs. As the story progresses, more locations are unlocked. Individual scenes as well as the view of objects take place in a three-dimensional representation from the first-person perspective; the mouse can be used to rotate the camera viewpoint or the object being viewed in these scenes. Combination and logic puzzles make up a large part of the game.

== Development ==
Subject 13 was announced in June 2014. Core funding was provided by Microids. In July 2014, the studio launched a crowdfunding campaign on kickstarter.com with the goal of raising $40,000 to fund additional game content. The funding goal was narrowly met over the course of the four-week campaign. The release was planned for October 2014, but it dragged on until May 28, 2015.

The graphics were created using the Unity game engine. The game's voice acting is in English; there are subtitles available in five languages. Ports of the game for Linux, Android and iOS have been announced, but have not yet appeared.

According to the lead developer of the game, Paul Cuisset, the studio "[...] wanted to recapture [the] essence [of the old days of point and click adventure games] with the creation of Subject 13."

On December 18, 2016, it was announced that the game would be released for the Xbox One on December 20, 2016.

== Reception ==
The PC version of Subject 13 received "Mixed Or Average Reviews" according to the review aggregator website Metacritic and holds a Metascore of 59 out of 100 points, based on 11 reviews.

Destructoid rated the game with 7 out of 10 points, claiming that the game is "[...] working really well for casual and hardcore puzzle fans [...].

The German online magazine 4Players felt reminded of the Professor Layton series due to the high density of incoherent puzzles. The magazine praised the detailed visuals as well as "routine puzzle entertainment", but criticized stale gameplay, as well as an insufficient and sometimes clichéd elaboration of the background story.

Adventure Gamers highlighted the "atmospheric soundtrack" and the successful combination of first-person and third-person perspectives, but like most other magazines, criticized the "weak" story and the repetitive, unoriginal puzzles.
