= Trove (video game) =

2015 video game

- Developer: Trion Worlds
- Publisher: Trion Worlds
- Platforms: Microsoft Windows, macOS, PlayStation 4, Xbox One, Nintendo Switch
- Release: Windows: WW: July 9, 2015; PlayStation 4, Xbox One: WW: December 13, 2016; Nintendo Switch: WW: June 23, 2021
- Genres: Sandbox, massively multiplayer online role-playing
- Mode: Multiplayer

Trove is a voxel-based sandbox game inspired by Minecraft developed and published by Trion Worlds. The game was released for Microsoft Windows and macOS in July 2015, and for PlayStation 4 and Xbox One in March 2017 and Nintendo Switch in June 2021.

== Plot ==
Centuries ago, the Sun Goddess brings out everyone to a time for oldness, when suddenly, the Moon Goddess and her Shadow Army attacks the crowd. To cast off the darkness, the Sun Goddess shatters the realms with a great life force. But still, the Shadows remain, and only the true heroes can fend them off, starting with the player themself.

== Development ==
Trove was first revealed on November 13, 2012 with players able to sign up to play the Alpha version of the game. Access to a closed Beta test was launched on September 25, 2014, a free week of Trove was out a month later on October 24–26, 2014. The game went in Open Beta on November 4, 2014. The console versions of the game went in open beta on December 13, 2016. Trove launched its Closed Beta in China on March 27, 2017. However, Trion Worlds would eventually be acquired on October 22, 2018 by Gamigo. Four days later on October 26, 2018, Trion Worlds ceased operations.

== Gameplay ==
Gameplay screenshot

Players assume the role of one of multiple classes each with different play styles and abilities. After a brief tutorial players arrive in a central area called the 'Hub'. In this area players can access Portals which act as access points to different in-game worlds each one tailored for a specific stage of progression. Each portal requires a minimum Power Rank to enter which gets higher per portal, allowing for progression from easier worlds to harder worlds as the player gains in level. Each world gets progressively harder but rewards higher levels of experience and better loot/resources. Each portal is of a specific color which is designed to indicate the quality of the 'loot' which can be most commonly located there, although there is a small chance that loot of a higher quality will be found. The exception to this is the higher level Red portals which predominantly drop Legendary quality loot but have a higher chance to drop loot of relic, resplendent or shadow quality as well. Higher Level Red portals have a better chance for to drop the rarer loot types.

In Trove only three of the equipable slot items can be obtained from defeating hostile Non-player characters, unlike in other role-playing games. The items which can be obtained in this way and here's the ways: hat, weapon, mask and banner slot items, These items form the 'loot drops' left behind either when some enemies are defeated or when a reward chest is opened following the defeat of a boss type NPC and also if you go to the table which sells stuff they will give you the skins of the weapons hat, mask, and banners.

Players can obtain the other equipable items from crafting, the ingame store, trade NPCs, reaching certain levels of Mastery, or via ingame badges. These items include rings, alternative character costumes (which unlock as your character increases in level), tomes, allies (permanent pets that boost the player character's stats), wings, mounts, boats, sails, flasks (which are consumed to restore the player character's health), fishing rods, mag riders ( a form of quick travel mount limited to use on train-like mono-rails), foods and Emblems, which add to or alter the benefits provided by Flasks.

A notable feature of Trove is the Collection. With the exception of Rings, Hats, weapons and masks, each of the other none loot drop items, once activated is added to the players library of unlocked items. Any character on that account can then access their own copy of that item from the collection and can select it from the corresponding item slot in their character equipment screen. For example, once you obtain a fishing rod on one character, you can activate it (default left mouse click) which will add the rod to your library. You then only have to select the fishing rod slot on the character screen to be taken to the fishing rod area of the library. Select the rod from the list and the item will be equipped. This can be done on any character on that account without restriction.

Rings, masks, hats, weapons, banners and food are not added to the library and so the player will only get one instance of the item unless more are found/crafted. If a player wishes to transfer the item between characters then they must first un-equip the item and change characters in order to equip it to the newly selected character.

Players can trade items manually through the Trading Post or via the in-game Marketplace in exchange for Flux/Penta-Forged Shadow Souls.

=== Character customization ===
Any Weapon, Hat or Face that is placed in the Loot Collector will be destroyed but the style of that item will be added to the player's library allowing the player to choose to use that item's image as a vanity, instead of the item currently equipped. This applies to masks, hats and weapons only. The new image only affects the appearance of the character and provides an altered visual appearance only. Additionally, any item which is destroyed in the Loot Collector provides the player with resources, useful in upgrading other items or in crafting.

Players can also alter their character's appearance at The Barbershop in the Hub zone.

=== Environments ===
The Hub zone is the central Zone in Trove and acts as a meeting place for all players as well as a way of accessing the lower level worlds until players are able to craft their own world portals.

The Hub also includes a selection of crafting stations and an NPC who sells items used for fishing, an in game semi-profession, and sailing.

Each world zone contains various biomes that focus on a specific theme. Each biome is connected seamlessly to each other and each world zone is open world in its construction allowing players to travel from biome to biome seamlessly within each world zone.

The biomes themselves each have their own unique NPC enemies which will attack the player if they get too close, as well as their own unique flora. One of the main features of each biome is their themed dungeons. For example, the Candoria biome, a theme based on sweets, chocolate and other such items can have dungeons shaped like giant cakes, gumball machines or a myriad of other themed objects related to the biome.

The biomes are known as: Medieval Highlands, Permafrost, Cursed Vale, Desert Frontier, Fae Wilds, Candoria, Neon City, Jurassic Jungle, Dragonfire Peaks, the Lost Isles, Sundered Uplands, Igneous Islands, the Shores of the Everdark, and the Geode, along with its battle biome.

==== Geode Biomes ====
The Geode Sanctuary is considered to be a hub biome. Players are met out in the Sunseeker Spire, which is known to be the home building of the Geodians. They can also travel to three different Geode Caves, known as Moonglow Grotto, Sunken Sunvault, and Verdant Veins. There are tiers for the caves, which can be met out with requirement upgrades on Geode equipment.

The Geode Topside is the battle biome where players do their casual battle gameplay on usual biomes. However, there are three special Leviathans that can be found in a specific land called Eerie Vale. The chests found after beating the Leviathan can be unlocked with Leviathan keys. There are also five-star dungeons with two three-star battles, and three cursed skull battles. The dungeon can be activated by destroying a Dark Heart located inside of it. By defeating all battles, players are given a Geode Chest with Crystalline Cores, or, in a rare chance, Forge Fragments. Crystalline gear can also be found inside Geode Topside chests, in a rare chance. They can be upgraded with Forge Fragments, and they can also be made on Sunseeker's Crytalforge.

=== Classes ===
There are currently 18 classes within Trove. These are: Bard, Boomeranger, Candy Barbarian, Chloromancer, Dino Tamer, Dracolyte, Fae Trickster, Gunslinger, Ice Sage, Knight, Lunar Lancer, Neon Ninja, Pirate Captain, Revenant, Shadow Hunter, Solarion, Tomb Raiser, Vanguardian. Each Character has their own strengths and weaknesses making the play style for each varied.

Each Character has a selection of unique abilities which unlock within the first few levels of play. Each Character has a main attack, secondary attack, unique passive ability, and 2 extra skills which can be triggered when desired and have built in cooldowns, limiting their use. The Unique passive ability allows the class to utilize their class mechanics, for example the Tomb Raiser class obtains charges called 'souls' either when a set period of time has passed or when an enemy is defeated. The Tomb Raiser can store up to 3 of these charges at any one time and can expend them using their secondary attack ability to summon NPC character minions to help him in combat.

=== Professions ===
There are three Crafting professions, each with their own particular crafting stations. With each craft the level of the profession increases which in turn allows the player access to higher quality recipes for each increase of 50 levels, until the profession level reaches the maximum of 250.

Players can also participate in Fishing, which can provide them with resources, items and trophies that are not obtainable via other means. However Fishing does not improve with levels and does not require a crafting station, unless the player is attempting to create more advanced fishing rods than the basic type purchasable from the Hub NPC, Saltwater Sam.

=== Shadow Tower ===
The Shadow Tower is a biome that contains a set of bosses: Spike Walker, Weeping Prophet, Vengeful Pinata God, Shadow Hydra, Darknik Dreadnought MK II, and Daughter of the Moon. There are three difficulty modes: NORMAL, HARD, and ULTRA. Each boss costs Flux, but players can collect armor and weapons from chests that need Shadow Keys in order to be unlocked. This is considered to be the final biome of the game, if you would ever want to make it feel like you were playing through the story.
