= Road to India (video game) =

2001 video game

- Developer: Microïds
- Publisher: Microïds
- Engine: Virtools
- Platform: Windows
- Release: 23 May 2001 (FR)
- Genre: Adventure

Road to India (also known as Road to India: Between Hell and Nirvana) is an adventure video game released in 2001, that was developed and published by Microïds.

== Gameplay ==
The player assumes the role of an American student named Fred Reynolds, who has travelled to India to find his girlfriend, Anusha, who was kidnapped by thugs. In the game the player has only three days to find the girlfriend, where they visit places such as New Delhi and the Taj Mahal. Each day is broken up into two parts: reality and the dream.

There is around 15 minutes of cinematics in the game, which uses the Virtools engine.

== Reception ==
Reception

Review scores
Publication	Score
Computer Games Magazine	3.5/5
GameSpot	7.0/10
PC Gamer (US)	67%
The Electric Playground	7/10
Just Adventure	C+

Awards
Publication	Award
GameSpot	Best Adventure Game 2001 (finalist)
The Electric Playground	Best Adventure Game for PC 2001 (finalist)

Scott Osborne of GameSpot gave the game a 7.0 "Good" rating and said "Road to India is a fine example of old-school adventure gaming with a modern presentation." Tamara Schembri of GameSpy thought the game was imaginative and stylish, albeit not perfect. Staci Krause of IGN wrote that while the game was entertaining, it was too short for the experience to be wholly recommendable.

Road to India was a nominee for GameSpot's 2001 "Best Adventure Game" and The Electric Playground's 2001 "Best Adventure Game for PC" awards, but lost both prizes to Myst III: Exile.
