= Microids =

French video game developer and publisher

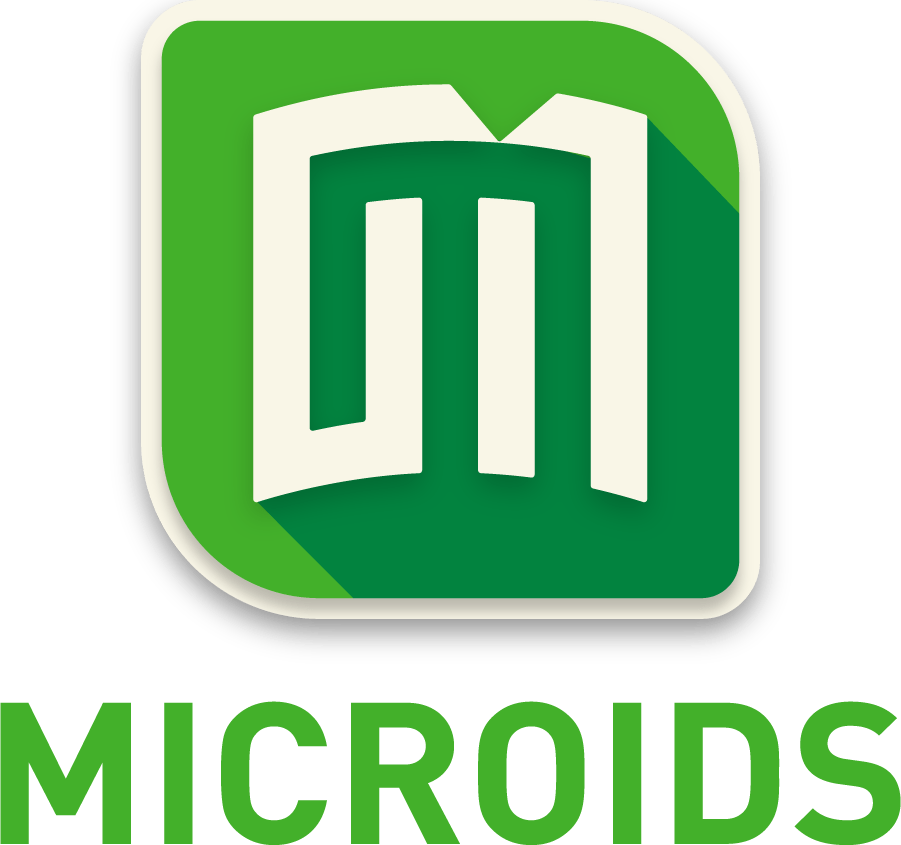
- Formerly: Microïds (1985–2003; 2007–2019); MC2-Microïds (2003–2005); MC2 (2005–2007)
- Type: Subsidiary
- Industry: Video games
- Founded: 1985; 41 years ago in Vélizy-Villacoublay, France
- Founder: Elliot Grassiano
- Headquarters: Paris, France
- Key people: Stéphane Longeard (CEO); Elliot Grassiano (VP)
- Parent: Anuman Interactive (2010–2019); Média-Participations (2019–present)
- Divisions: Microids Distribution France
- Website: www.microids.com

Microids (formerly Microïds) is a French video game developer and publisher based in Paris. Founded in 1985 by Elliot Grassiano, it attained early success with games published through Loriciel in France and other partners (including Activision and Broderbund) in international markets. Through expanding its staff and development teams, Microïds generated funds to expand from just development to publishing and distribution and opening international offices. The company merged with MC2 in 2003 to create MC2-Microïds, whereafter it acquired publishers Wanadoo Edition and Cryo Interactive. Grassiano left MC2-Microïds in 2005; under new management, MC2-Microïds was briefly renamed MC2 before returning to the old Microïds name. It was then acquired by Anuman Interactive in 2010, which itself was renamed Microïds (then simplified to Microids) in 2019.

== History ==
=== Background and early years (1985–2003) ===
Microïds was founded by Elliot Grassiano, a French programmer. He was educated at the Lycée Louis-le-Grand school from 1972 to 1974 and later studied engineering, electronics, and computers at the École nationale supérieure d'arts et métiers. He started working as an engineer for the defence system company SAGEM in 1979. By the 1980s, Grassiano had become interested in telecommunications, consumer electronics, and video games. He acquired a Thomson MO5-model home computer, which he used to create his first game, Space Shuttle Simulator. The game was published by Loriciel and released to both critical and commercial success. Subsequently, Grassiano quit his job to establish his own company. He formally founded Microïds in 1985, setting it up in Vélizy-Villacoublay, a suburb of Paris. He was aided in these efforts by Loriciel's founders, Laurent Weill and Marc Bayle, as well as Patrick Le Nestour, another engineer. The name "Microïds" was a portmanteau of "microinformatique" ("micro-informatics") and "androids". Within its first year of operation, the company grew to five people, with Grassiano in the managerial role.

Initially, Microïds set out to create consumer robotics projects before shifting its focus solely to video games. The first Microïds-developed game was Air Attack, released by Loriciel for the Thomson MO5 to moderate commercial success. Early adventure games developed by Microïds include Oceania (developed by Le Nestour and released in 1985 for the Thomson MO5 and TO7) and Les Pyramides D'Atlantys (developed by Luc Thibaud and released for the Amstrad CPC in 1986). Air Attack provided the groundwork for subsequent Microïds games, such as 500 cc Grand Prix for the Amstrad CPC, which debuted in 1986. This game was the company's first breakthrough title, partially driven by the CPC's success in France. By way of a deal between Loriciel and Activision, the game was also released in the UK, it was also released in the US, and it was later ported to other systems, such as the Atari ST. The American market appeared especially viable for Microïds, who believed that game sales would vastly outnumber the domestic ones. For this reason, it partnered with the American publisher Broderbund in 1987, which released several Microïds games in the country, partially under altered names. In return, Microïds managed sales of Broderbund's games, notably Prince of Persia and Karateka in France.

Throughout the 1990s, Microïds underwent expansion, increasing both staff count and development team sizes. Development operations were accelerated to output more games, leading to increased profits. Through the new-earned funds, the company commenced operations in both video game publishing and distribution in 1995, and between then and 1997 opened three international subsidiaries: Microïds Italia in Milan, Microïds UK in Milton Keynes, and Microïds Canada in Montreal. By 1997, Microïds had 20 employees and a turnover of 20 million French francs. Both increased tenfold by 2002 and the Canadian studio alone housed 105 of Microïds' 200 employees by 2003.

=== Later years (2003–present) ===
In 2003, Microïds merged with MC2, a French software company, with the amalgam assuming the name MC2-Microïds. In September that year, it acquired Wanadoo Edition, the games division of Wanadoo, which itself had been created through a September 2000 merger between Index+ and France Telecom Multimedia in exchange, Wanadoo received a 12% stake in MC2-Microïds. In 2004, MC2-Microïds proceeded to close Microïds UK, while Microïds Italia spun off as Blue Label Entertainment. Microïds Canada was sold off to Ubisoft in March 2005, with the studio's 50 employees integrated into Ubisoft's own Ubisoft Montreal studio. Later that year, Grassiano left MC2-Microïds due to internal disagreements. He was succeeded by Index+ founder Emmanuel Olivier, who was named chief executive officer (CEO). With this management change, MC2-Microïds shortened its name to just "MC2". This decision was reversed in November 2007, when it returned to the original "Microïds" name. In 2008, Microïds further acquired the assets and intellectual property of bankrupt publisher Cryo Interactive.

In 2009, the publisher Anuman Interactive, while in the process of being acquired by Média-Participations, began looking for possible acquisitions of its own. That November, the company announced its intent to acquire Microïds. The acquisition was completed on 1 January 2010, after which Microïds continued operating as a division of Anuman. Alongside the acquisition, Olivier left the company. A sub-label for non-adventure games, Microïds Games for All, was launched the same year. In 2013, Grassiano joined Anuman and became the vice-president for Microïds. Additionally, an indie game label, Microïds Indie, was opened in September 2016. In July 2019, the Microïds label name was simplified to "Microids". That October, Microids announced that Anuman would be renamed "Microids", with Anuman CEO Stéphane Longeard becoming the CEO of Microids, co-managing it with Grassiano. Microids also opened a Japanese office run by Martial Meyssignac and Yves Bléhaut, and strengthened the Microids Indie label with a dedicated team managed by Vincent Dondaine. A distribution arm, Microids Distribution France, was established in December 2020. In October 2024, Microids launched a new third-party publishing unit. According to the company, the unit consists of 7 internal staffers with editorial, sourcing, and publishing experience.

==== Investments ====
Microids has had a minority stake in OSome Studio since April 2022.

== Games ==
List of games developed and/or published by Microids
Date	Title	Ref.
1986	Grand Prix 500 cc	
1986	Rodeo	
1986	Demonia	
1987	Superbike Challenge	
1987	Downhill Challenge / Super Ski	
1989	Highway Patrol	
1989	Chicago 90	
1990	Highway Patrol 2	
1990	Super Ski 2	
1990	Eagle's Rider	
1991	Sliders	
1991	Killerball	
1991	Grand Prix 500 2	
1992	Nicky Boom	
1993	Action Sport	
1993	Super Sport Challenge	
1993	Genesia/Ultimate Domain	
1993	Nicky 2	
1994	Super Ski 3	
1994	Ultimate Domain	
1994	Carlos	
1995	Fort Boyard - The Challenge	
1996	Evidence: The Last Report	
1996	Secret Mission	
1997	Saban's Iznogoud	
1997	Des chiffres et des lettres	
1997	Rising Lands	
1998	Shogo: Mobile Armor Division	
1999	Amerzone: The Explorer's Legacy	
1999	Corsairs: Conquest at Sea	
1999	Dracula: Resurrection	
1999	Speed Demons	
2000	Empire of the Ants	
2000	Far Gate	
2000	Warm Up!	
2001	Fort Boyard	
2001	Monster Racer	
2001	Road to India: Between Hell and Nirvana	
2001	Open Kart	
2001	Tennis Masters Series	
2001	Times of Conflict	
2001	Druuna: Morbus Gravis	
2001	Snow cross, developed by Vicarious Visions	
2001	X'treme Roller	
2002	Kohan: Battles of Ahriman	
2002	Syberia	
2002	Post Mortem	
2002	War and Peace: 1796–1815	
2002	Master Rallye	
2002	Warrior Kings	
2002	Casper	
2002	Tennis Masters Series 2003	
2004	Jack the Ripper	
2004	Syberia II	
2005	Still Life	
2005	Jules Verne's Journey to the Center of the Moon	
2006	Dangerous Heaven: The Legend of the Ark	
2007	Sinking Island	
2007	Nostradamus: The Last Prophecy	
2008	Dracula 3 - The Path of the Dragon	
2009	Still Life 2	
2009	Return to Mysterious Island II	
2011	Red Johnson's Chronicles	
2012	Red Johnson's Chronicles - One Against All	
2012	Crazy Cars: Hit the Road	
2013	Louisiana Adventure	
2013	Nicolas Eymerich, The Inquisitor: Book 1 - The Plague	
2013	Dracula 4: The Shadow of the Dragon	
2013	Dream Chamber	
2013	Dracula 5: The Blood Legacy	
2014	9 Elefants	
2015	Nicolas Eymerich, The Inquisitor: Book 2 - The Village	
2015	Subject 13	
2016	Agatha Christie: The ABC Murders	
2016	The Descendant	
2016	Moto Racer 4	
2016	Yesterday Origins	
2017	Syberia III	
2017	Gear.Club Unlimited	
2018	Asterix & Obelix XXL 2	
2018	Toki	
2019	Asterix & Obelix XXL 3: The Cristal Menhir	
2019	Blacksad: Under the Skin	
2020	Asterix & Obelix XXL Romastered	
2020	The Bluecoats: North & South	
2020	Who Wants To Be A Millionaire?	
2020	XIII	
2021	Agatha Christie: Hercule Poirot: The First Cases	
2021	Beyond a Steel Sky	
2021	The Smurfs: Mission Vileaf	
2021	Marsupilami: Hoobadventure	
2021	Asterix & Obelix: Slap Them All!	
2021	Alfred Hitchcock – Vertigo	
2021	F.I.S.T.: Forged In Shadow Torch	
2022	Syberia: The World Before	
2022	Asterix & Obelix XXXL: The Ram From Hibernia	
2022	Arkanoid: Eternal Battle	
2022	Garfield: Lasagna Party	
2022	Smurfs Kart	
2022	New Joe & Mac: Caveman Ninja	
2023	Scrap Riders	
2023	Operation Wolf Returns: First Mission	
2023	Tintin Reporter: Cigars of the Pharaoh	
2023	Asterix & Obelix: Slap Them All! 2	
2023	Flashback 2	
2023	Inspector Gadget: Mad Time Party	
2023	Dolphin Spirit: Ocean Mission	
2023	UFO Robot Grendizer: The Feast of the Wolves	
2023	Agatha Christie: Hercule Poirot: The London Case	
2023	Agatha Christie: Murder on the Orient Express	
2024	The Smurfs: Village Party	
2024	Melobot - A Last Song	
2024	Flint: Treasure of Oblivion	
2024	The Smurfs: Dreams	
2024	Totally Spies!: Cyber Mission	
2024	Empire of the Ants	
2024	Arsene Lupin: Once a Thief	
2024	Little Big Adventure - Twinsen’s Quest	
2025	Amerzone: The Explorer's Legacy (Remake)	
2025	Corsairs: Battle of the Caribbean	
2025	Space Adventure Cobra - The Awakening	
2025	Agatha Christie: Death on the Nile	
2025	Syberia - Remastered	
