= List of Cryo Interactive video games =

This is a list of video games published and/or developed by Cryo Interactive.

Title	Alternate title(s)	Year of release	Publisher	Developer	Platforms
360: Three Sixty		1999	Cryo Interactive	Cryo Interactive	PlayStation
The 3rd Millennium		1997	Cryo Interactive, R&P Electronic Media	Cryo Interactive	Windows
Agassi Tennis Generation		2002	Cryo Interactive	Aqua Pacific	Game Boy Advance, PlayStation 2, Windows
Aliens: A Comic Book Adventure		1995	Mindscape	Cryo Interactive	MS-DOS
Arthur's Knights: Tales of Chivalry	King Arthur's Knights: Origins of Excalibur (European title)	2000	Cryo Interactive	Cryo Interactive	Windows
Arthur's Knights II: The Secret of Merlin	Arthur's Knights 2: Merlin's Secrets (UK)	2001	Wanadoo	Cryo Interactive	Windows
Asterix & Obelix Take on Caesar	Astérix & Obélix contre César (France)	1999	Cryo Interactive	Tek 5	PlayStation, Windows
Atlantis: The Lost Tales		1997	Cryo Interactive; R&P Electronic Media; Sega (Saturn)	Cryo Interactive	MS-DOS, PlayStation, Sega Saturn, Windows
Atlantis II	Beyond Atlantis (US)	1999 (Windows); 2001 (Macintosh)	Cryo Interactive (Windows); The Adventure Company (Macintosh)	Cryo Interactive	Macintosh, Windows
Atlantis III: The New World	Beyond Atlantis 2 (US)	2001 (Windows); 2002 (PlayStation 2)	Cryo Interactive	Cryo Interactive	PlayStation 2, Windows
Aztec: The Curse in the Heart of the City of Gold	Sacred Amulet, The (US)	1999 (Windows); 2000 (PlayStation)	Cryo Interactive	Cryo Interactive; France Télecom Multimedia	PlayStation, Windows
Big Bug Bang: Le Retour de Commander Blood		1996^{[I]}	Microfolie's	Cryo Interactive	MS-DOS
Black Moon Chronicles		1999	Cryo Interactive; CD Projekt (Poland)	Cryo Interactive	Windows
Black Moon Chronicles: Wind of War		cancelled	Cryo Networks	Vircom	Windows
China: The Forbidden City	China: Intrigue in The Forbidden City	1998	Cryo Interactive; R&P Electronic Media	Canal+ Cryo Interactive; Réunion des Musées Nationaux	PlayStation, Windows
Cheese Cat-Astrophe starring Speedy Gonzales		1995	Sega	Cryo Interactive	Sega Mega Drive, Game Gear, Master System
Commander Blood		1994	Mindscape; Microfolie's	Cryo Interactive	MS-DOS
Deo Gratias		1999	Cryo Networks	France Télecom Multimedia	Windows
Devil Inside, The		2000	Cryo Interactive; Take-Two Interactive (US)	Gamesquad	Windows
Dracula: The Last Sanctuary		2000	Cryo Interactive (Europe, PS version); DreamCatcher Games (US); Wanadoo Edition (Europe, Win and Mac)	index+	Macintosh, PlayStation, Windows
Dracula: Crazy Vampire		2001	Cryo Interactive (Europe) DreamCatcher Games (US)	Planet Interactive Development	Game Boy Color
Dragon Lore		1994	Mindscape	Cryo Interactive	3DO, MS-DOS
Dragon Lore II: The Heart of the Dragon Man		1997	Cryo Interactive	Cryo Interactive	Windows
Dreams to Reality	Dreams (PlayStation version)	1997	Cryo Interactive	Cryo Interactive	MS-DOS, PlayStation, Windows
Dune		1992	Virgin Interactive	Cryo Interactive	Amiga, MS-DOS, Sega CD
Dune Generations		cancelled	Cryo Networks	Cryo Networks	Windows
Egypt 1156 B.C.: Tomb of the Pharaoh		1997	Canal+ Cryo Interactive; R&P Electronic Media; DreamCatcher Games	Cryo Interactive; Réunion des Musées Nationaux	PlayStation, Windows
Egypt II: The Heliopolis Prophecy		2000	Cryo Interactive	Cryo Interactive; Réunion des Musées Nationaux	PlayStation, Windows
Egypte Kids	Egypte Kids (France)	2001	Cryo Interactive	EMG	Windows
Extase		1991	Virgin Interactive	Cryo Interactive	Amiga, Atari ST, MS-DOS
Fashion World		1995	Cryo Interactive	Cryo Interactive and Take 2	Windows, Macintosh
Faust: The Seven Games of the Soul	The Seven Games of the Soul (US)	1999	Cryo Interactive	Arxel Tribe	Windows
FireTeam		1999	Cryo Networks; France Télecom Multimedia	Multitude	Windows
Frank Herbert's Dune		2001	Cryo Interactive; Dreamcatcher Games	Widescreen Games	PlayStation 2, Windows
Frank Herbert's Dune: Ornithopter Assault	Elland: The Crystal Wars	cancelled	Cryo Interactive	Soft Brigade	Game Boy Advance
From Dusk Till Dawn		2001	Cryo Interactive	Gamesquad	Windows
Gadget: Past as Future	Gadget: Invention, Travel & Adventure (first release)	1993 (first release); 1998 (re-release)	Synergy Interactive (first release); Cryo Interactive (re-release)	Synergy Interactive	Macintosh, Windows
Gift	Gift: Le Cadeau des Étoiles (France); Gifty: Ein Geschenk des Himmels (Germany)	2000	Cryo Interactive; Wanadoo	Eko System	PlayStation 2, Windows, Game Boy Color
Guardian of Darkness, The		1999	Cryo Interactive	Cryo Interactive	PlayStation, Windows
Hard Boiled		1997	Cryo Interactive (Europe); Sieg (Japan)	Cryo Interactive	PlayStation
Hardline		1996	Virgin Interactive	Cryo Interactive	MS-DOS
Hellboy: Dogs of the Night	Hellboy: Asylum Seeker (PlayStation)	2000 (Windows); 2003 (PlayStation)	Cryo Interactive	Cryo Studios North America	PlayStation, Windows
Hopkins FBI		1998	Cryo Interactive; MP Entertainment; CD Projekt (Poland)	MP Entertainment	Linux, Windows
Intervention		cancelled	Cryo Interactive	Cryo Interactive	Windows
Jekyll and Hyde		2001	Cryo Interactive (Europe); Dreamcatcher Games (US)	In Utero	Windows
Jerusalem: The Three Roads to the Holy Land		2002	Cryo Interactive	Arxel Tribe	Windows
KGB	Conspiracy (CD-ROM version)	1992	Virgin Interactive	Cryo Interactive	Amiga, MS-DOS
L.A. Blaster		1997	CDV Software (Germany)	Cryo Interactive	MS-DOS
Lost Eden		1995	Virgin Interactive; Philips Interactive Media (CD-i)	Cryo Interactive	3DO, Macintosh, CD-i, MS-DOS
Mankind		1998	Cryo Networks (retail); O2 Online Entertainment (online)	Vibes Online Gaming	Windows
MegaRace		1993	Mindscape	Cryo Interactive	3DO, MS-DOS, Sega CD
MegaRace 2		1996	Mindscape	Cryo Interactive	MS-DOS
MegaRace: MR3 - Nanotech Disaster		2001	Dreamcatcher Games	Cryo Interactive	PlayStation 2, Windows
Best of Microsoft Entertainment Pack (Europe Only)		2001	Cryo Interactive	Saffire	Game Boy Color
Microsoft Pinball Arcade (Europe Only)		2001	Cryo Interactive	Saffire	Game Boy Color
Millennium Racer: Y2K Fighters		1999	Cryo Interactive	Creat Studios	Windows
Money Mad		2000	Cryo Interactive	Ravensburger	Windows
Monsterville	Universal Studios Monsters: Monsterville	2002	Cryo Interactive	Intelligent Games	Windows
Mystery of the Nautilus, The	Secret of the Nautilus (UK)	2002	Cryo Interactive (Europe); Dreamcatcher Games (US)	T-bot	Windows
Necronomicon: The Dawning of Darkness		2001	Cryo Interactive (Europe, PlayStation version); Dreamcatcher Games (US)	Wanadoo	PlayStation, Windows
New Adventures of the Time Machine, The		2000	Cryo Interactive	Cryo Interactive	Windows
Odyssey: The Search for Ulysses		2000	Cryo Interactive (Europe); Dreamcatcher Games (US)	In Utero	Windows
Out of the Vortex		Cancelled		Cryo Interactive	Sega Mega Drive
Pax Corpus		1997	Cryo Interactive; R&P Electronic Media	Cryo Interactive	PlayStation, Windows
Persian Wars		2001	Cryo Interactive	Cryo Interactive	Windows
Pink Panther: Pinkadelic Pursuit		2002	Cryo Interactive; Wanadoo	Etranges Libellules (PlayStation and Windows); SuperEmpire Interactive (GBA)	Game Boy Advance, PlayStation, Windows
Pompei: The Legend of Vesuvius	TimeScape: Journey to Pompeii (US)	2000	The Adventure Company; Cryo Interactive; Dreamcatcher Games (US)	Arxel Tribe	Macintosh, Windows
Quiz Challenge: Football	Foot Quiz	2002	Cryo Interactive; Wanadoo	Cryo Interactive	Windows
Raven Project, The		1995	Mindscape	Cryo Interactive	MS-DOS, PlayStation
Ring: The Legend of the Nibelungen		1999	Cryo Interactive; R&P Electronic Media	Arxel Tribe	Windows
Riverworld	Philip José Farmer's Riverworld	1998	Cryo Interactive	Cryo Interactive	Windows
Rip-Tide Racer		2000	Cryo Interactive	Cryo Interactive	Game Boy Color
Roland Garros French Open 2000	Open Tennis 2000 (UK)	2000	Cryo Interactive	Carapace	Game Boy Color, Windows
Roland Garros French Open 2001		2001	Cryo Interactive	Carapace	PlayStation, Windows
Saga: Rage of the Vikings		1999	Cryo Interactive; R&P Electronic Media	Cryo Interactive	Windows
Salammbo: Battle for Carthage		2003	The Adventure Company; Ontario Europe	Cryo Interactive^{[II]}	Windows
Scotland Yard		1999	Cryo Networks; Ravensburger	Cryo Networks; France Télecom Multimedia	Windows
Shadow of Zorro, The		2001	Cryo Interactive	In Utero	PlayStation 2, Windows
Stealth Combat	Stealth Combat: Ultimate War (international)	2002	Modern Games (Germany); Cryo Interactive (international)	Deck13	Windows
Super Dany		1994	Virgin Interactive	Cryo Interactive	SNES
Test Drive 6 (Europe Only)		1999	Cryo Interactive	Pitbull Syndicate; Xantera (GBC)	Game Boy Color, PlayStation, Windows
Timecop		1995	Victor Entertainment	Cryo Interactive	SNES
Treasure Hunter	Chasseur de Trésors (France)	1997	Microfolie's; Philips Interactive Media	Cryo Interactive	Windows
Ubik		1998	Cryo Interactive; R&P Electronic Media	Cryo Interactive	PlayStation, Windows
Versailles 1685	Versailles: Complot à la Cour du Roi Soleil (France)	1997; 1998 (PlayStation)	Canal+ Cryo Interactive; R&P Electronic Media (PlayStation); Réunion des Musées Nationaux	Cryo Interactive	Macintosh, MS-DOS, PlayStation, Windows
Versailles II: Testament of the King		2002	Réunion des Musées Nationaux	Cryo Interactive	Windows
Virus: It is Aware		1999	Cryo Interactive	Cryo Interactive	PlayStation
Woody Woodpecker: Escape from Buzz Buzzard Park		2001	DreamCatcher Interactive (US); Cryo Interactive (Europe)	Cryo Interactive; Eko System	PlayStation 2, Windows, Game Boy Color
Zero Zone		1998	Cryo Interactive; R&P Electronic Media	Cryo Interactive	Windows
Zidane Football Generation	Calcio 2003 (Italian Windows release); Football Generation (international, PS2 and Win)	2002 (GBA, GBC); 2003 (Win); 2006 (PS2)^{[III]}	Cryo Interactive (GBA and GBC); Trecision (PS2 and Win)	Aqua Pacific (GBA and GBC); Trecision (PS2 and Win)	Game Boy Advance, Game Boy Color, PlayStation 2, Windows

- I Big Bug Bang had a limited release in France and Canada, exclusively in French language.
- II Completed posthumously.
- III Release for Windows and PlayStation 2 was cancelled upon demise of Cryo Interactive. After publishing rights were subsequently acquired by developer Trecision in 2003, the game got a limited independent release, albeit stripped of its Zinedine Zidane license.
