= David Gasman =

American actor

- Born: Seattle, Washington, U.S.
- Other name: Dave Gasman
- Education: Cornish College of the Arts
- Occupation: Actor
- Years active: 1992–present

David Gasman is an American television, film and voice actor. He has appeared in many cartoons and video games, such as the Rayman series, Code Lyoko, and Dragon Ball films. He appeared in the films Jefferson in Paris (1995), The Bourne Identity (2002), Babylon A.D., Largo Winch (both 2008), Arthur and the Revenge of Maltazard (2009), and in many theatrical productions, including several musicals. He had a recurring role in Kaboul Kitchen, a French TV series.

He has appeared in every game developed by Quantic Dream: The Nomad Soul (1999), Fahrenheit (2005), Heavy Rain (2010), Beyond: Two Souls (2013), and Detroit: Become Human (2018).

== Biography and career ==
Gasman was born in Spokane, Washington and graduated from the professional acting conservatory at Cornish College of the Arts. While pursuing an interest in poetry and Shakespeare, he became an English-speaking actor and voice actor living in Paris, France. Gasman also dubbed various characters, mainly Goku and Oolong, in the AB Groupe English dubs of various Dragon Ball and Dragon Ball Z films. He has acted in small roles in live-action films such as The Bourne Identity (2002), Largo Winch (2008), and From Paris with Love (2010).

== Filmography ==
=== Live-action credits ===
==== Television ====
Year	Title	Role	Notes	Ref.
2014	Kaboul Kitchen	Harvey Stein	12 episodes	

==== Film ====
Year	Title	Role	Notes	Ref.
1995	Jefferson in Paris	Liberal Aristocrat		
2002	The Bourne Identity	Deputy DCM		
2004	Immortal	Customer in Giant's Bar		
2005	Le pouvoir inconnu	Men in Black	Short film	
2008	Showdown of the Godz	Jesse		
2008	Babylon A.D.	Neolite Researcher		
2008	The Heir Apparent: Largo Winch	Alexander Meyer		
2010	From Paris with Love	German Tourist; The Voice		
2011	New York November	Miles	Voice	
2013	The Dark Sorcerer	The Director	Tech demo	
2014	1001 Grams	Delegate		
2016	The Lobby	Radio host	Voice, short film	
2017	Powerless	Alex Price, DRH	Short film	
2017	Hostile	Harry		
2018	The Sisters Brothers	Relay owner		

=== Voice acting credits ===
==== Film ====
Year	Title	Role(s)	Notes	Ref.
2003	Dragon Ball: Curse of the Blood Rubies	Yamcha, Oolong	AB Groupe English dub	
2003	Dragon Ball: Sleeping Princess in Devil's Castle	Oolong	AB Groupe English dub	
2003	Dragon Ball Z: Dead Zone	Son Goku, Big Green, Sansho, Ginger, Ox-King	AB Groupe English dub	
2003	Dragon Ball Z: The World's Strongest	Son Goku, Oolong	AB Groupe English dub	
2003	Dragon Ball Z: The Tree of Might	Son Goku, Oolong	AB Groupe English dub	
2003	Dragon Ball Z: Lord Slug	Son Goku, Oolong, Dorodabo	AB Groupe English dub	
2003	Dragon Ball Z: Cooler's Revenge	Son Goku, Oolong, Sauzer	AB Groupe English dub	
2003	Dragon Ball Z: The Return of Cooler	Son Goku, Oolong	AB Groupe English dub	
2003	Dragon Ball Z: Super Android 13!	Son Goku, Oolong	AB Groupe English dub	
2003	Dragon Ball Z: Broly The Legendary Super Saiyan	Son Goku, Oolong, Dr. Briefs	AB Groupe English dub	
2003	Dragon Ball Z: Bojack Unbound	Son Goku, Tenshin, Oolong	AB Groupe English dub	
2003	Duck Ugly	Simon		
2007	Persepolis	Additional voices		
2009	Eleanor's Secret	Dad, Ogre, Peter Pan		
2009	Arthur and the Revenge of Malthazard	The King, Bogo Chief, Mechanic		
2010	Arthur 3: The War of the Two Worlds	The King; additional voices		
2011	A Monster in Paris	Clerk		
2013	850 Meters	Magic Compass	Short film	

==== Television ====
Year	Title	Role(s)	Notes	Ref.
1994	Orson and Olivia	Teddy, Greg; various		
2000	Chris Colorado	Chris Colorado, Thanatos; various		
2001–2007	Cedric	Robert		
2002	Corto Maltese	Lt. Tenton, El Oxford, Puck; various		
2003	Dragon Ball Z: Bardock The Father of Goku	Bardock, Son Goku		
2003	Dragon Ball Z: The History of Trunks	Son Gohan (older), Oolong		
2003–2007	Code Lyoko	XANA, William Dunbar, Jim Morales, Herb Pichon; various		
2005	The Invisible Man	Alan Crystal/Invisible Man		
2006–2014	Ozie Boo!	Fred, Ted, Ned, Ed		
2007	Funky Cops	Dick Kowalski, Captain Dobbs, Boogaloo; various		
2007	Tangerine & Cow	Cow		
2008–2019	The Minimighty Kids	Big-Wolf, Dede, Sacha		
2010–2016	The Daltons	Jack Dalton, William Dalton, Pete	European dub	
2012–2016	The Mysterious Cities of Gold	Ambrosius, Zares; various		
2016	Kaeloo	Mr. Cat		
2017	My Knight and Me	Henri of Orange, Coach, Bad Jack		

==== Video games ====
Year	Title	Role	Notes	Ref.
1995	Lost Eden	Mungo, Fugg		
1997	Little Big Adventure 2 (Twinsen's Odyssey)	Twinsen		
1997	Atlantis: The Lost Tales	Seth		
1997	Egypt 1156BC: Tomb of the Pharaoh	Ramose		
1998	China: The Forbidden City	Superintendent An		
1999	Atlantis II: Beyond Atlantis	Ten, Brother Felim, Tepec; various		
1999	Black Moon Chronicles	Magus, Wismerhill; various		
1999	Boarder Zone	Karl Ung		
1999	Outcast	Cutter Slade		
1999	Ring: The Legend of the Nibelungen	Alberich, Fasolt, Hunding, Dril		
1999	Tonic Trouble	Ed		
1999	Rayman 2: The Great Escape	Rayman, Polokus	Voice director, English script writer	
2000	Arthur's Knights: Tales of Chivalry	Narrator; Sir Gawain; various		
2000	Dracula: Resurrection	Jonathan Harker		
2000	Egypt II: The Heliopolis Prophecy	Nubian, Governor Nakht		
2000	Gold and Glory: The Road to El Dorado	Miguel		
2000	The Legend of the Prophet and the Assassin	Ceradoc, Uvak Khan; various		
2000	Pompei II: The Legend of Vesuvius	Adrian Blake, Caius; various		
2001	Alone in the Dark: The New Nightmare	Edward Carnby		
2001	Atlantis III: The New World	The Targui, Psychopomp; various		
2001	Casanova: The Duel of the Black Rose	Giacomo Casanova, Giovanni Battista Tiepolo		
2001	Chronicles of Pern: Dragon Riders	V'Hul, Hered, Ralf; various		
2001	Dracula 2: The Last Sanctuary	Jonathan Harker		
2001	The Secrets of Alamût	Ceradoc		
2001	Rayman M	Rayman, Evil Rayman, Murfy		
2002	Arthur's Knights II: The Secret of Merlin	Narrator; Sir Gawain; various		
2002	The Cameron Files: Secret at Loch Ness	Alan Parker Cameron		
2002	Iron Storm	Colonel Mitchell		
2002	Jerusalem: The Three Roads to the Holy Land	Adrian Blake		
2002	The Shadow of Zorro	Zorro/ Don Diego de la Vega		
2003	Rayman 3: Hoodlum Havoc	Rayman		
2003	Curse: The Eye of Isis	Darien		
2003	Kya: Dark Lineage	Atea, Apou		
2003	Salammbo: Battle for Carthage	Hamilcar, Potter; various		
2003	XIII	Senator Willard; various		
2004	Egypt III: The Fate of Ramses	Paser, Ptah, Psychopomp, Stammering Guard		
2004	Hellboy: Asylum Seeker	Hellboy, Peter; various		
2004	Return To Mysterious Island	Captain Nemo, Robot		
2005	Echo: Secrets of the Lost Cavern	Arok, Toar, Lharik		
2005	Fahrenheit: The Indigo Prophecy	Lucas Kane, Tyler Miles; various	Voice director	
2006	The Secrets of Atlantis: The Sacred Legacy	Howard Brooks		
2007	Asterix at the Olympic Games	Doctormabus, Silencius		
2007	Code Lyoko: Quest for Infinity	William Dunbar, Jim Morales		
2007	Destination: Treasure Island	Jim Hawkins		
2008	Dracula 3: The Path of the Dragon	Father Arno Moriani		
2008	Sinking Island: A Jack Norm Investigation	Jack Norm		
2010	Heavy Rain	Mad Jack, Hassan, Paco Mendez	Voice and mocap performance	
2010	Red Steel 2	Jian		
2011	Runaway 3: A Twist of Fate	Ernie Parsley, Lt. Col. Jerome Chapman		
2011	R.U.S.E.: The Art of Deception	Captain Kowalski, General Miliken		
2011	Driver: Renegade	John Tanner, Dr. Lewis		
2011	Might & Magic Heroes VI	Azkaal		
2011	The Next Big Thing	Big Albert, The Grim Reaper; Zelssuis's Robots		
2012	Amy	Professor Raymond, Father John; Soldiers	Voice director	
2012	Might & Magic Heroes VI: Danse Macabre	Duke Ovidio Bull		
2012	Might & Magic Heroes VI: Pirates of the Savage Sea	Crag Hack, Jon Morgan		
2012	Might & Magic Heroes VI: Shades of Darkness	Narrator; Lord Vein, Azkaal, Crag Hack's Ghost		
2012	Of Orcs and Men	Arkhail		
2012	Yesterday	Boris; additional voices		
2013	Beyond: Two Souls	Lieutenant Sherman, CIA Agent 1	Voice and mocap performance	
2013	Fighter Within	"DJ" Joao Kalanga		
2014	Bound By Flame	Demon (male)		
2014	Styx: Master of Shadows	Aaron		
2015	Blood Bowl 2	Bob		
2016	Furi	The Voice		
2016	Yesterday Origins	Boris Doe, various		
2017	Styx: Shards of Darkness	Aaron, Arkhail		
2018	The Council	Narrator; Lord William Mortimer; various		
2018	Detroit: Become Human	Police officer	Voice and mocap performance	
2022	Syberia: The World Before	Gustav Renner		
2022	Mario + Rabbids: Sparks of Hope	Rabbid Mario, Captain Orion, Rayman		
2023	Sclash	Fuyu Elder, Ryuujin		
2023	Agatha Christie: Murder on the Orient Express	Count Rudolf Andrenyi, Pierre Michel, Mehdi Wadi, Policeman, Laboratory Technician		
2023	Tintin Reporter – Cigars of the Pharaoh	Brutish Rastapopoulos' Bodyguard, Oliveira da Figueira, Corporal Ibn-Abou-Bekhr, Abudin's Air Force Private, Khitmagar, Maharajah's Brother		
2023	UFO Robot Grendizer: The Feast of the Wolves	Genzo Umon, Captain Gorman, Banta Arano		
2024	Welcome to ParadiZe	Presenter, Papa Davis, Ignacio		
2026	Rayman Legends Retold	Rayman		
