= Egypt Kids =

2001 video game

Egypte Kids
- French cover art
- Developer: EMG
- Publisher: Cryo Kids
- Producers: Jean-Martial Lefranc; Philippe Ulrich
- Artists: Mzone Studio; T-bot Interactive
- Platform: Windows
- Release: FRA: December 1, 2001; POL: July 11, 2002; RUS: July 26, 2002; DEU: 2004; WW: February 17, 2009
- Genres: Educational, adventure
- Mode: Single-player

Egypt Kids (French: Égypte Kids) is an educational video game, released in 2001 for Microsoft Windows. It was developed by EMG and published by Cryo Interactive under the Cryo Kids brand. The game was made in association with Réunion des Musées Nationaux. The Russian version was localised by Nival Interactive. The game is available in English, French, Italian, German, Spanish, and Polish.

== Plot ==
The game is set in Heliopolis, a city located on the banks of the River Nile, in Ancient Egypt. The player solves mysteries to learn about subjects like life in Egypt and the Egyptian Gods. Dragoo, a mischievous young dragon, is the player's guide through the game. The game also includes an Ancient Egypt multimedia encyclopaedia.

== Gameplay ==
The game consists of many interactive and educational workshops, each revolving around a theme such as architecture, hieroglyphs, religion, and music.

== Development ==
This was Cryo, the Louvre and the Réunion des musées nationaux's third collaboration after Egypt and Egypt II.

== Reception ==
Reception

Review scores
Publication	Score
Adventure Spiele	100% (received AVSN award)
MeriStation	7/10
Adventure-archiv	64%
Gry Online	4.5/10

Olaf Szewczyk of Polygamia thought the game offered a pale representation of the interesting Egyptian culture.

== See also ==
- Egypt: 1156 B.C.: Tomb of the Pharaoh
- Egypt 2: The Heliopolis Prophecy
- Egypt 3: The Egyptian Prophecy
