= Quantex =

Quantex may refer to:

- Quantex Microsystems, computer manufacturer
- Quantex Online Entertainment, company that maintains the video game Mankind
