= Gift (2000 video game) =

2000 platform video game by Eko System

- Developer: Eko Software
- Publishers: Cryo Interactive; Wanadoo Edition
- Platforms: PlayStation 2 Windows; Game Boy Color
- Release: Windows: UK: November 10, 2000; PlayStation 2: EU: July 6, 2001; Game Boy Color: EU: August 31, 2001
- Genres: Platform, action-adventure
- Mode: Single-player

Gift is a platform game developed by French studio Eko Software that parodies elements of popular adventure games. It was created by Cryo Interactive's creative director Philippe Ulrich (creator of the Dune video game) and by author, cartoonist and illustrator Régis Loisel. The game is set over ten levels in a fully three-dimensional world.

== Gameplay ==
Gift is a 3D action-adventure game, which parodies the world of computer games. The game is set in eight 3D worlds. The characters found in these environments imitate characters from existing games, cartoons, and films.

The playable character, Gift, has special talents that can be manipulated throughout the game including the ability to fly, swim, climb, jump and undertake death-defying leaps. In addition to arming himself with a special energy-powered staff, water jets, cannons and a vast collection of imaginative weapons, the game features challenging real-time puzzle solving situations set against elaborately illustrated 3-D environments.

A unique feature is how light is used to impact the gameplay. Throughout the game, Gift must fend off a host of enemies including 'the Little Clears' and 'the Little Darks'. Because the Little Clears are afraid of the dark, it is important for him to remain in the light. By doing this, the Little Clears will not be able to detect Gift. In order to eliminate the Little Darks, Gift must launch a fireball to illuminate an area so he can see the foes. The game requires players to constantly make decisions by working with the unfolding story, making use of power-ups and clues along the way.

The game enables players to change from the third-person perspective to the first-person point of view. This gives the game more edge and variety, particularly when using an arsenal of weapons.

== Plot ==
A fictional game being tested has exhausted all the heroes who have already been assigned to rescue princess Lolita Globo. Gift, a sneaky and overweight slob with a big mouth, is the latest hero to volunteer for the job. Armed with a magic staff, his mission is to conquer The Shadow of the Black Deep Dark Night. In doing so, he must lead seven dwarves to Lolita, who suffers from Snow White delusions, in seven worlds crammed with parodies of famous games and films.

Each of the seven worlds holds danger. Gift must battle, solve puzzles, be resourceful, and constantly test his abilities to survive and conquer the opposing dark forces. Gift must collect seven dwarves from the worlds Tiptanic, Alcatraz, Star Stress, Drakuland, Iceland, Paztec and Mine of Horror, each dwarf providing clues to where Lolita can be found. In this eighth and final world, Gift must encircle the princess with the dwarves. This will enable Gift to rescue his true love from the clutches of the Shadow of the Black Deep Dark Night. Each world is led by one of the dwarves, who each have their own idiosyncratic personalities: lust, envy, anger, laziness, miser, greed, and vanity.

== Development ==
Phillipe Ulrich served as creative director over Cryo Interactive's games. Ulrich thought of the game concept ten years prior to its release and remained involved in its production. Development had been triggered by a conversation with Régis Loisel. Together, they devised the characters, world, and plot, infusing it with Loisel's unique art style. The duo approached the young development studio Eko Software, which created a 3-D game engine specifically for the game. Eko Software was founded in 1999 specifically for the game.

The team used exact measurements for each room, building it like an architectural model, informed by the gameplay rules, such as characters being allowed to move across the screen and into the light. The illustrators then designed the lighting and aesthetic of each room. The 3-D graphic artists created models of the room based on the concept art. Bitmappers drew the walls, objects, etcetera, and mappers added images to the rooms.

The characters were designed as a result of Loisel's research. The modeler created a triangle-based wire sculpture, and then texture-mapped the character image on top of the sculpture. The cartoonist created animations for physical actions of the characters walking, jumping, climbing, etc. The speed and length of movements were adjusted according to the gameplay. After creating one character, Loisel designed companions and enemies to populate the universe.

The game borrows motifs from franchises like Tomb Raider, Rayman, Quake, The Matrix and Star Wars. Cryo UK's managing director Stuart Furnival explained, "We've taken some of the elements from Crash Bandicoot and Tomb Raider, and developed a hybrid of the platform and action adventure genres to create a contemporary, sophisticated and unique game." Cryo advertised Gift as one of the first video games to parody other video games.

== Release ==
Cryo Interactive developed Gift for PlayStation 2, Game Boy Color, and Microsoft Windows. The game was intended to launch first on Game Boy and Windows in November 2001, then followed up with a release on PlayStation 2 late that year. The Windows release was set for November 10 in the UK, alongside a game called Arthur's Knights, based on the Arthurian legend. Their website had a Game Boy Color release for November 2000 and a PlayStation 2 release for April 2001. The Game Boy Color version was later pushed back to December. The developer demonstrated the Game Boy Color version at the European Computer Trade Show. On September 27, 2000, Cryo Interactive told IGN that the American publisher would be announced within two weeks. For the PlayStation 2 version, Cryo gave the game retouched graphics and fifteen extra rooms. A localized version of the game was released in Poland on May 25, 2001. The game was released May 2001 in the Czech Republic. The game was distributed in the Czech Republic by Bohemia Interactive, who also created the Czech game manual. The game was released in Spanish in 2000, including a four-page translated manual. In September 2001, the game's price was lowered. A demo of the game was released with a November 2000 issue of Level38 Magazine. The PlayStation 2 version was cancelled in the US and unreleased in Japan and Australia.

An animated TV series adaptation of the game, directed by Fred Louf, was broadcast on France 2 in 2005. Philippe Ulrich produced the music for the project. Produced by Shipowners, Melusine Productions, and Art & Esprit, the series consisted of 26 episodes running at around 13 minutes each. The series' first wireless broadcast was on July 2, 2005, on France 2–CD2A, and reruns aired until June 8, 2008, on France 2–KD2A.

== Reception ==
IGN stated that Cryo Interactive had managed to create "a little devil of a character" that would provide a brand new platform experience to the PlayStation 2. Eurogamer gave the game 7 out of 10, and said "despite his cute bug-eyes he is actually quite repulsive! The game does deserve to do well though on the strength of its well worked puzzles alone." French site Jeuxvideo.com felt that the PlayStation 2 version was worth playing in an area lacking in good games, praising its universe and original scenario while commenting that the PC version had a friendly and tense atmosphere. Of the Game Boy version, Jeuxvideo.com deemed it simplistic, weary and too short. French site Gamekult felt that Gift's gameplay and graphics make it a platform game that is quite recommendable, even if it was not the revelation of the year. The website stated that the game "achieved relative success on PC". Czech site Doupe.cz felt that Cryo Interactive was known as the creator of brilliant storytelling adventures, precise processing, and a revolutionary shift along with each new title, although Gift did not seem to offer as much new content to the genre as other Cryo Interactive titles.

Polish site Kzet found that the game's unusual characters, interesting scenario ideas and surrealistic interiors – all flavored with a pinch of humor – create a fascinating atmosphere that makes the game interesting. Gry Online deemed the game both interesting and addictive, and felt its difficulty challenged the perception of platforms being a genre for children. Bonusweb praised the title for not just being for young or casual players, but for appealing to the entire gaming community. However, it felt that the poor level design and camera work let the game down. The site felt the Game Boy Color version was a disappointment and not as good as it could have been. Santiago Lamelo Fagilde at Meristation wrote that even though he did not like the genre and reviewed the game out of obligation, he found it relatively enjoyable.

Play2 asserted that while the creators had intended to revolutionise the genre, Gift had been a missed opportunity. Game.EXE wrote that the game was both beautiful and clever, though very difficult. Doupe felt the game proved Cryo was able to make good games in a variety of genres, not just in adventures that the company had been known for, though felt it was not as interesting as the company's other games. Console Plus gave the PC version a rating of 84% and felt it was a pity that the Game Boy Color version's gameplay was not very good, ultimately giving it 77%. PC PowerPlay deemed it a "challenging and controversial tour de force". PPE.pl asserts that the gameplay is relatively linear. SME Tech praised the game's environments, soundscape, and gameplay.

== See also ==
- List of video games by Cryo Interactive
