= Dragon Lore II: The Heart of the Dragon Man =

- Developer: Cryo Interactive
- Publisher: Interplay Entertainment
- Platform: Windows
- Release: 1997
- Genre: Action role-playing

Dragon Lore II: The Heart of the Dragon Man is a 1997 video game developed by Cryo Interactive and published by Interplay Entertainment. The game is a sequel to Dragon Lore.

== Gameplay ==
In Dragon Lore II: The Heart of the Dragon Man, the player character is Werner von Wallenrod, a Dragon Knight searching for his missing dragon while traveling through the capital city of Draconia, moving between buildings and underground areas, talking to characters, and completing quests that require finding and delivering specific items.

The game uses first‑person, point‑to‑point navigation with a cursor for movement, speaking, and taking actions, along with life, strength, and magic bars that change through eating, sleeping, or gaining experience. The player collects items with limited inventory space, combine some to solve puzzles, and must locate objects that may be difficult to see. Movement can lead to new areas, conversations, or combat.

Battles use mouse‑controlled attack types, jousting shifts to a third‑person view for balancing and aiming, and spells are cast through icons. The game spans three CDs with disc swapping for certain transitions, all reloads require the first disc, and jousting rounds require repeating a set of preparations. The story leads to a final confrontation with the rival, and an unmarked interface button immediately exits to the credits.

== Reception ==
Reception

Review scores
Publication	Score
Computer Gaming World	2.5/5
GameSpot	3.1/10
PC Gamer	35%
PC Player	3/5
PC Games	55%

PC Gamer called Dragon Lore II bland and uninteresting. GameSpot criticised the combat as well as the interface. Hardcore Gaming 101 praised the game's major graphical and gameplay improvements but concluded that, despite all its advances, Dragon Lore II was ultimately a worse game than its predecessor.
