= Dragon Lore =

1994 video game

Dragon Lore: The Legend Begins
- European MS-DOS cover art
- Developer: Cryo Interactive
- Publisher: Mindscape
- Director: Fabrice Bernard
- Designers: Fabrice Bernard; François Marcela Froideval; Johan K. Robson
- Programmer: Fabrice Bernard
- Composer: Stéphane Picq
- Series: Dragon Lore
- Platforms: MS-DOS, 3DO
- Release: MS-DOS: EU: 1994; NA: December 1994; 3DO: EU: 1995; NA: 1995
- Genre: Adventure game
- Mode: Single-player

Dragon Lore: The Legend Begins (French: Dragon Lore: La légende commence), is a point-and-click adventure game released in 1994 by Cryo Interactive for MS-DOS, and ported to the 3DO video game console. The game was a commercial success, with sales of 300,000 units by 1997.

An emulated version was released for Windows and macOS in 2013.

== Gameplay ==
Dragon Lore is a point and click adventure game seen from the first person perspective. The player character must interact with various characters in a fantasy atmosphere, solve puzzles, and fight enemies. Fighting with enemies depends largely on equipment found and some enemies are not defeated in face to face confrontation, but by solving puzzles.

== Plot ==
Werner Von Wallenrod, a farm boy uncovers that he is the orphaned son of Axel von Wallenrod, a "Dragon Knight." Werner sets out to uncover his past and reclaim his heritage. Werner's ultimate goal is to earn the favor of enough of the current Dragon Knights so as to be voted into their order. He also has to deal with his rival, Haagen Von Diakkonov.

== Release ==
The game was bundled with multimedia kits such as the Reveal kit that featured a SC400 sound card, speakers, and a large bundle of multimedia software, including games and educational titles. Besides Dragon Lore, this kit featured another Cryo Interactive game, MegaRace. At the time, many personal computers were not equipped with CD-ROMs and sound cards out of the box, and users wanting these features may have chosen their kit based on the pack-in software.

In Spain, it was originally marketed in an edition with Spanish texts and English voices. In 1996 it was re-released by Planeta DeAgostini as part of the Juegos CD-ROM collection together with Cyclemania, in a new Spanish dubbed edition.

GOG.com released an emulated version for Microsoft Windows and Mac OS X in 2013.

== Reception ==
Reception

Review scores
| Publication | Score |
|---|---|
| Computer Gaming World | 3/5 (DOS) |
| Next Generation | 3/5 (DOS) |
| PC Gamer (US) | 82% |

Dragon Lore was a commercial success, with sales of 300,000 units by 1997.

A reviewer for Next Generation applauded the game for its fast-moving rendered graphics, captivating plot, and gratifyingly difficult puzzles in its later sections. He added that the inclusion of fighting segments, in addition to being satisfying of themselves, serve to break up the monotony that puzzle adventure games sometimes suffer from.

Computer Gaming World praised the game for its "tremendous graphics" and "meaningful game options" but criticized how the game world appeared "too empty and non-interactive"

GamePro's brief review of the 3DO version stated, "Smooth, rendered 3D animation and voice clips accompany the great mythological storyline to make up a well-rounded game. RPG fans will enjoy the attention to detail as well as the intuitive motions and menus ... slow access time is one of the few setbacks."

== See also ==
- List of Cryo Interactive video games
