= Christian Erickson =

American actor

- Born: August 30, 1946 (age 80); Annapolis, Maryland, U.S.
- Other names: Christian Erichson; Christian Erikson; Jon Christian Erickson; Christian Ericksson
- Occupation: Actor
- Years active: 1977–present

Christian Erickson (born August 30, 1946) is an American actor based in Paris, France. He is known for his role as La Trémoille in The Messenger: The Story of Joan of Arc (1999), as General Kormarov in the film adaptation of Hitman and as Lance Boyle, the TV presenter in the MegaRace video games series.

== Partial filmography ==
=== Films ===
- The Sidelong Glances of a Pigeon Kicker (1970) - Gordon (uncredited)
- Fun with Dick and Jane (1977) - Trans-Sexual
- My Friend Washington (1984)
- Le 4ème pouvoir (1985)
- Asterix Versus Caesar (1985) - (English version, voice)
- À notre regrettable époux (1988)
- Dangerous Liaisons (1988) - Bailiff
- Aventure de Catherine C. (1990) - L'Anglais
- Near Mrs. (1992) - Col. Edward Young
- The Man in the Iron Mask (1998) - Ballroom Guard
- The Messenger: The Story of Joan of Arc (1999) - La Trémoille
- Kennedy et moi (1999) - Le vendeur canadien
- Le divorce (2003) - Museum Curator
- The Statement (2003) - Father Joseph
- Les ombres (2003, Short) - Meyris
- Touristes? Oh Yes! (2004)
- Twice Upon a Time (2006) - Richard
- Arthur and the Invisibles (2006) - Antique Dealer
- Hitman (2007) - General Kormarov
- Ca$h (2008) - Kruger
- 8th Wonderland (2008) - NASSI President
- Eight Times Up (2009) - Monroe
- La rafle (2010) - MacLelland
- Les Aventures extraordinaires d'Adèle Blanc-Sec (2010) - La momie 'Ramses II'
- Black Venus (2010) - Lord Ellenborough
- Au Revoir My Paris Heart (2010) - Gerard
- Always Brando (2011) - James
- Le Skylab (2011) - Toby (dans le train)
- Dernier amour (2019) - Lord Pembroke
- Blood Machines (2019) - Lago
- The Substance (2024) - Man at diner

=== Television ===
- Mistral's Daughter (1984) - Ed
- Madame et ses flics (1985) - Woodward
- Crossbow (1987) - Lascal
- Renseignements généraux (1991) - James, le butler
- Counterstrike (1992, "No Honour Among Thieves") - Parry Traherne
- Orson and Olivia (1993) (voice)
- Fall from Grace (1994)
- Insektors (1994) - (voice, USA dub)
- Dog Tracer (1996) - (voice)
- Highlander (1998) - Jack Kendall
- Lost Souls (1998, TV Movie) - Jack Mennias
- Funny Little Bugs (2001) - (voice)
- Martin Morning (2003) - (voice)
- Kaelou: Red Light, Green Light... 1, 2, 3!!! (2007) - Mr. Cat (voice)
- Commander Clark (2010) - (voice)
- The Mysterious Cities of Gold (2012) - (voice)

=== Video games ===
- MegaRace (1993) - Lance Boyle
- Relentless: Twinsen's Adventure (1994) - Dino-Fly / Dr. Funfrock / Grobos / Groboclones (voice)
- The Last Dynasty (1995) - (voice)
- MegaRace 2 (1996) - Lance Boyle
- Atlantis: The Lost Tales (1997) - (voice)
- Dark Earth (1997) - (voice)
- AmerZone: The Explorer's Legacy (1999) - Antonio Àlvarez (English version, voice)
- Outcast (1999) - William Kauffman (voice)
- Omikron: The Nomad Soul (1999) - (voice)
- The Devil Inside (2000) - Jack T. Ripper (English version, voice)
- Rayman 2: The Great Escape (2000) - Globox (English Version, PlayStation 1)
- Frank Herbert's Dune (2001)
- Alone in the Dark: The New Nightmare (2001) - (voice)
- MegaRace 3 (2002) - Lance Boyle
- Platoon (2002) - Stephen Evers (voice)
- XIII (2003) - Galbrain / Dr. Johnansson / Conspiracy Members #2 (voice)
- Syberia II (2004) - Colonel Emeliov Goupatchev (English version, voice)
- Fahrenheit (2005) - The Oracle / John (English version, voice)
- Paradise (2006) - (English version, voice, as Christian Eriksson)
- Dark Messiah of Might and Magic (2006) - Menelag (English version, voice)
- Heavy Rain (2010) - The Doc / Motel Receptionist / Blue Lagoon Barman (voice)
- MegaRace: DeathMatch (in development)
- Shadow Stalkers (in development)

=== Web series ===
- Raising Hitler (2017)

=== Multimedia series ===
- Songs of the Sea (2007) - Oscar The Tiger Fish, Seahorse
- Wings of Time (2014) - Shahbaz

=== Music ===
- The Dark waltz (2015, Disk and dvd, english translation and interpretation in Les Funambules)
