= Jekyll and Hyde (video game) =

2001 video game

- North American cover art
- Developer: In Utero
- Publishers: NA: DreamCatcher Interactive; EU: Cryo Interactive
- Platform: Windows
- Release: NA: August 31, 2001; EU: 2001
- Genre: Adventure
- Mode: Single-player

Jekyll and Hyde is an adventure video game by Cryo Interactive. It was released for Windows in 2001. The game is based on the 1886 novella Strange Case of Dr Jekyll and Mr Hyde by Robert Louis Stevenson.

== Story ==
Set in 1890 London, after the tragic death Dr. Jekyll's wife, he has been in mourning with his daughter, Laurie, both went to Jekyll's laboratory located in a Mental Hospital for the insane where he works. A mysterious man called Burnwell, one of the patients of the Asylum goes berserk and poisons with an reagent drug and all the food supplies of the asylum inmates and they go in a killing spree inside the asylum, when Jekyll was working at his lab, Burnwell kidnapped his daughter Laurie from her room and the Nurse warned Jekyll not go any closer to Burnwell otherwise he would kill her, Jekyll goes after Burnwell and along the way he rescues a Doctor of the asylum but fails to save another when he falls to his death after Burnwell cuts the rope with a knife where the second doctor was trapped besides Laurie in the atrium, Burnwell demands Dr. Jekyll to bring back his alter ego, Mr. Hyde Dr. Jekyll has no choice but to reactivate his laboratory equipment and bring back his dreaded alter ego, Mr. Hyde. after going to the atrium of the asylum a second time and confronting Burnwell the man escapes with Laurie and Jekyll is suddenly faced by an appearance of a second mysterious tall and thin man who calls himself simply by the name "The Attorney", he demands Dr. Jekyll to find three metallic piece keys of a book that is called the Book of Zohar, the three metallic pieces are guarded by a Chinese noble called James yang, an Maharaja from India and a Voodoo Witch Doctor.

== Reception ==
The PC version of Jekyll and Hyde received "generally unfavorable reviews" according to the review aggregation website Metacritic, holding a score of 34 out of 100 based on 10 critic reviews.

Although the sound effects and the game's musical score by Bertrand Eluerd were sometimes praised, the game was heavily criticized for its frustrating controls, confusing camera angles, and poor level design. IGN's Staci Krause scored the game a 2.7 out of 10, writing that "good voice acting is unfortunately overshadowed by the lack of animation when characters are speaking... if almost nothing else is good about a game, sound cannot save it." Krause further criticized the dated graphics and lack of gameplay challenge, noting that the combat and boss encounters were overly simplistic. GameSpot similarly panned the title, calling it "among the worst action-adventure games ever released," and stating that its technical flaws made it seem "less like a game and more like a parody of its genre."

Several reviewers felt the game failed to do justice to the original Robert Louis Stevenson novella. Computer Gaming World called the game a "mockery of good reading material," while Electric Playground remarked that the author would be "turning over in his grave at the atrocity that has been committed in his name." PC Gamer criticized the game's bizarre atmosphere, describing the setting as a "bad parody of a David Lynch production" draped in unengaging "weirdness wallpaper," and Computer Games Magazine complained of extreme repetition, likening the experience to playing Groundhog Day II.

Despite the widespread negative reception from gaming journalists, a few outlets highlighted the game's unique artistic direction. GameSpy offered a rare positive review with a score of 70 out of 100, stating that the game successfully created "a moody and interesting game out of the book's characters," with some "very cool stuff" included. Furthermore, according to former developers at In Utero, the title still sold well upon release despite the largely mediocre press reviews.

== See also ==
- List of video games by Cryo Interactive
- Adaptations of Strange Case of Dr. Jekyll and Mr. Hyde
