= ERE Informatique =

French video game company

The ERE Informatique logo.

ERE Informatique was one of the first French video game companies, founded in 1983 by Emmanuel Viau, joined a year later by Philippe Ulrich. The company hired freelance game programmers that received royalties for their creations.

== History ==
Initially, the company published titles for the Amstrad CPC, Spectrum and Oric home computers. In 1984 they published their first national hit, a flight simulator created by Marc André Rampon: Intercepteur Cobalt for Sinclair ZX81 and Spectrum, also known under the name of Mission Delta for Oric, Amstrad and Thomson MO5. Rampon also acquired some shares of the company owned by Viau and established the company's first distribution network.

Their first international hit, topping many international sales list for several months, was Macadam Bumper (1985), a pinball simulation programmed by Rémi Herbulot, a self-taught ex-employee of Valeo living in Caen. This and several later titles were distributed (and labelled) by PSS in the United Kingdom, thanks to a mutual distribution agreement.

ERE underwent serious financial problems due to some distributors delaying payments (and some ultimately entering bankruptcy), and was looking to partner with a company able to ensure a secure distribution. FIL and Infogrames went into competitive bidding and eventually Infogrames entered Ere's share capital by buying out Rampon's shares by the end of 1986. Infogrames later acquired complete control of ERE in June, 1987.

Its Exxos label, announced in 1988 would produce their most famous and creative games. Due to financial problems, chiefly royalty inpayment, ERE's members left Infogrames in 1989 to form an independent developer group named Cryo, that would be made into an official company in 1992 as Cryo Interactive Entertainment.

== Exxos ==
Exxos logo, designed by Didier Bouchon.

The development label Exxos was announced to the press in a ceremony at Champs Elysées ERE Studio 102 on June 12, 1988. Philippe Ulrich delivered the following litany to the press (translated from French):

Mesdames and Messieurs, the decision was not easy, but all the same, we have agreed to reveal to you the secret of our dynamism and the creativity which makes ERE Informatique a success.

If there are sensitive people in the room, I ask them to be strong. They have nothing to fear if their vibrations are positive; the telluric forces will save them...

My friends, the inspiration does not fall from the sky, the genius is not the fruit of chance...

The inspirer and the genius which designed Macadam Bumper, that is not the fabulous Remi Herbulot or the marvellous Michel Rho...the inspirer and the genius which generated Captain Blood, it is not the inextinguishable Didier Bouchon and even less your servant.

It is Him! Him who has been in our offices for months... He who comes from outside the Universe. He that we reveal today to the world, because the hour has come. I name Exxos.

I ask you to say after me some magic sentences which point out his country to him: ATA ATA hoglo hulu, ATA ATA hoglo hulu...

The new label would release games with two requisites: original stories and worlds drawn from science fiction — a running interest among many members of ERE — or fantasy and translated to various languages, to achieve wide international distribution.

== Games released ==
=== ERE label ===
- Mission Delta (1984) (also known as Intercepteur Cobalt)
- Macadam Bumper (1985) (also known as Pinball Wizard)
- Painting Joe
- Contamination (1985).
- Pacific (1986)
- 1001 BC (1986)
- Sram I (1986)
- Sram II (1986)
- Get Dexter (1986) (also known as its French title Crafton & Xunk)
- Phalsberg (1987)
- Eden Blues (1987)
- Bubble Ghost (1987)
- Despotik Design (1987)
- Oxphar (1987)
- Crash Garrett (1987)
- Qin (1987)
- Get Dexter 2 (1988) (also known as its French title L'Ange de Cristal)
- RoBBBoT (1988)
- Apocalypse (video game 1988) (1988)
- Teenage Queen (1988)

=== ERE label utils ===
- VOX (1984) speech, Sound Manipulation
- ZX Spectrum Compilateur (1985) (re-release by PSSS with name McoderIII)

=== Exxos label ===
- Captain Blood (1988) (also known as L'Arche du capitaine Blood; first copies still under the ERE label)
- Purple Saturn Day (1988)
- KULT: The Temple of Flying Saucers (1989)
