= MR2 =

MR2 or MR-2 may refer to:

- Toyota MR2, a sports car
- MegaRace 2, a 1996 video game
- Mercury-Redstone 2, an American space mission
- Monster Rancher 2, a 1999 video game
- Nimrod MR2, a military aircraft
- Beijing–Nanning–Hanoi through train
