= Macadam Bumper =

1985 video game

- C64 budget reissue
- Developer: ERE Informatique
- Publishers: ERE Informatique (France); Personal Software Services (UK); Accolade (US)
- Designer: Remi Herbulot
- Platforms: Amstrad CPC, Atari ST, Commodore 64, MS-DOS, MSX, Oric, Thomson, ZX Spectrum
- Release: EU: 1985; NA: 1988
- Genres: Pinball, game creation system

Macadam Bumper (also released as Pinball Wizard) is a video pinball simulation construction set developed by ERE Informatique in France. It was first released for 8-bit computers in 1985, the Atari ST in 1986 and MS-DOS in 1987. The Atari ST and MS-DOS versions were released in the US as Pinball Wizard in 1988 by Accolade.

== Gameplay ==
Pinball Wizard is a game which includes sound and lights and the ability to tilt, with different obstacles on each of the four pinball simulations. On the Atari ST, the player manipulates the flipper and back-board controls using the mouse, but too much movement from the mouse will activate the tilt sensors. Players can customize the parameters in the game including as point scores, table slope, bumper elasticity, and the number of balls per game. Using a parts menu, the player can assemble a pinball machine, coloring and decorating it from the paint menu.

Widebody tables or more traditional layouts can be created. A parameter can be changed to adjust the weight of the ball, from a lead weight to a ping-pong ball.

The Atari ST version added support for a mouse.

== Development and release ==
Macadam Bumper was created by French programmer Rémi Herbulot, who conceived the game while looking for software to develop for his Oric computer. He wanted to create a pinball simulation that would also allow players to construct their own tables. After programming the original game in approximately three months, Herbulot approached several software publishers and signed an agreement with Ere Informatique.

While adapting the game for the ZX Spectrum in February 1985, Herbulot was approached by Ere Informatique's Philippe Ulrich, who supplied him with an Amstrad CPC 464 computer to develop another conversion. With limited technical documentation available, Herbulot examined the computer's ROM to implement faster system routines. He completed the Amstrad version approximately two months later. Michel Rho contributed graphics to Herbulot's early games.

== Reception ==
In 1988, Dragon gave the game 4½ out of 5 stars.

Pinball Player found the Atari ST version a "very playable package" recommended to any pinballer.

In 1985, Macadam Bumper jointly received the Tilt d'Or award for Best Pinball Game from French magazine Tilt, alongside Cobra Pinball.

The ZX Spectrum version received positive reviews from the British gaming press. Crash awarded the game an overall score of 87% in October 1985, while Sinclair User gave it four out of five stars the following month. Sinclair User reviewer John Gilbert praised the simulation and table-construction features, although he noted the absence of authentic mechanical pinball sounds.

Your Spectrum awarded the game nine out of ten in November 1985. A later budget re-release received 66% from Your Sinclair in September 1990.

== See also ==
- Pinball Construction Set
