= Rip-Tide Racer =

2000 video game

- Developer: Cryo Interactive
- Publisher: Cryo Interactive
- Platform: Game Boy Color
- Release: 2000
- Genre: Racing
- Modes: Single-player, multiplayer

Rip-Tide Racer is a 2000 video game developed and published by Cryo Interactive for the Game Boy Color. Players race futuristic hoverbikes named waterpods across eight courses. Upon release, the game received negative reviews, with most critics finding the game was difficult to control, and competing racers were too slow to be challenging.

== Gameplay ==
Screenshot

Players compete against other racers to race futuristic hoverbikes named waterpods. In Time Trial mode, players select one of three hoverbikes, with different levels of speed or armor, and must complete three laps against three opponents, with eight courses on offer. Players can also collect power-ups, including shields, mines and a turbo boost. In Deathmatch mode, players must defeat all their opponents throughout the stage in a set time limit. The game features eight courses. Bikes have weapons allowing players to shoot and slow down their competitors. The game supports local multiplayer play using the Game Link Cable in which players compete against each other and computer racers.

== Reception ==
Reception

Review scores
Publication	Score
Total!	4/10
Video Games (DE)	2/5
Game Boy Power	2/10
Game Boy Xtreme	20%
Juegos & Cia	8.4/10
Superjuegos	40%

Ian Osborne of Game Boy Power faulted the game's "weak" graphics, also stating that it was impossible to navigate corners, and the competing racers were "ridiculously slow". Similarly, Martin Kramer of Total! found the game to be "far too easy" and have limited challenges or variation in gameplay. Video Games was also unimpressed with the limited game options and short time needed to complete the game. Describing Rip-Tide Racer as "disastrous", Game Boy Extreme wrote that it "fails on every level" and could be finished in an hour. Stating that the game was "not worth it", A.C. Mayerick of Superjuegos critiqued the game's "terrible graphics and minimal gameplay", particularly faulting its sound effects and lack of sound or music during gameplay. In contrast, Jose Luis of Juegos & Cia considered the game well-made and praised its multiplayer.
