= The Guardian of Darkness =

1999 video game

- Developer: Cryo Interactive
- Publisher: Cryo Interactive
- Producer: Eric Mallet
- Platforms: PlayStation, Windows
- Release: 1999
- Genre: Action
- Mode: Single-player

The Guardian of Darkness (aka Le Gardien des ténèbres) is a French action game developed and published by Cryo Interactive in 1999 for the PlayStation and Microsoft Windows.

The player takes the role of a monk at an occult organisation who must face and defeat supernatural entities. The game has CGI graphics, with the camera placed behind the player's body. While mostly an action title, it has adventure elements in terms of investigating and locating objects via point-and-click. The game includes 10 missions in total, which the player must complete to beat the game.

== Reception ==
Reception

Review score
Publication	Score
PC Gaming World	4/10

JeuxVideo not only thought it as a bad game, but was disappointed at the consistently low quality of titles being pumped out by Cryo at this point in time. Gry Online highlighted the vast array of locations the player gets to visit through their travels. Meristation felt that while the game was not particularly innovative, it was still enjoyable. Game Over Online praised the game's originality, hoping that other developers took note.
