= MegaRace 3 =

2002 video game

- Developer: Cryo Interactive
- Publishers: EU: Cryo Interactive; NA: DreamCatcher Interactive
- Series: MegaRace
- Engine: RenderWare
- Platforms: Windows, PlayStation 2
- Release: Windows: NA: 9 January 2002; EU: 24 May 2002; PlayStation 2: EU: 29 March 2002
- Genres: Racing, Vehicular combat
- Modes: Single-player, multiplayer

MegaRace 3 is a racing video game developed by Cryo Interactive in 2002, released for Windows and the PlayStation 2. MegaRace 3 is the third game in the MegaRace series, after MegaRace and MegaRace 2. MegaRace 3 is most known for a brief appearance in the 2005 film Zathura: A Space Adventure.

This game also features the return of host, Lance Boyle, once again played by Christian Erickson. It renders the game graphics in full real-time 3D, unlike the previous two games.

Microïds, owners of the Cryo brand, made the game available on GOG.com on 2 June 2009.

== Reception ==
Reception

Review scores
Publication	Score
PC Games	69%
The Adrenaline Vault	4/5
Jeuxvideo	11/20
