= Captain Blood (1988 video game) =

1988 video game

- IBM PC UK cover with the Exxos logo
- Developer: Exxos (ERE Informatique)
- Publisher: Infogrames
- Designers: Philippe Ulrich; Didier Bouchon
- Programmers: Sylvain Tintillier; François Lionet
- Artists: Didier Bouchon; Michel Rho
- Composer: Jean-Michel Jarre
- Platforms: Atari ST; Amiga; Apple IIGS; IBM PC; Amstrad CPC; Commodore 64; ZX Spectrum; Thomson TO7; Macintosh
- Release: 1988
- Genre: Adventure
- Mode: Single-player

Captain Blood (L'Arche du Captain Blood in France) is a French video game made by ERE Informatique (soon relabeled with their short-lived Exxos label) and released by Infogrames in 1988. It was later re-released in the UK by Players Premier Software.

The game was first released on the Atari ST, and was later for the Commodore 64, Macintosh, Amiga, Apple IIGS, IBM PC, ZX Spectrum, Amstrad CPC, and Thomson TO8 / MO6. The ST version is the only version that includes the full set of alien language sounds.

The title tune is a stripped down version of "Ethnicolor" by Jean-Michel Jarre.

== Plot ==
The titular character of the game is a 1980s video game designer, Bob Morlock, who picked "Captain Blood" as a nickname in tribute to the film starring Errol Flynn of the same name. Morlock develops a new video game about aliens and space travel. While testing his new project for the first time, he becomes warped inside the spaceship of the very game he had designed. Soon after, Blood is forced to go into hyperspace mode and, due to an incident, gets accidentally cloned 30 times. For 800 years, Blood tracks down every clone, as each one took a portion of his vital fluid. When the game begins, Blood has successfully disintegrated 25 clones, but he needs to kill the last five clones who turned out to be the most difficult to track down, or he will lose his last connection with the human species.

== Gameplay ==
Communication screen in the Atari ST version of the game. The player uses the hand-shaped cursor to assemble symbolic UPCOM messages while conversing with an alien.

The objective of the game is to track down and disintegrate five clones of Captain Blood (referred to as Duplicates or Numbers depending on the version of the game). To find them, the player must speak to various aliens and gain their trust. Communication with aliens occurs via an icon-based interface known as UPCOM. This consists of around 150 icons, each representing a different concept. As each alien race discovered speaks its own language and reacts differently, the player must learn to negotiate using these UPCOM concepts in a style that suits each race.

Other unique facets of the gameplay included changes in the player interface as the game progressed; as time wore on, the character's health deteriorated. This was represented in-game via an increasing amount of shaking of the mouse cursor, making the game more and more difficult to control. Disintegrating a clone would temporarily relieve the symptoms.

The player starts the game at the bridge of a biological ship, the Ark. The ship begins in the vicinity of one of four predetermined planets, each inhabited by a single alien. To make contact with an alien, the player launches an OORXX—a biological probe—to the planet's surface. The player must successfully navigate the probe over a fractal landscape, eventually reaching the alien at the end of a valley. The UPCOM interface then appears so that the player may talk to the alien and find out more information—most importantly, the coordinates of other inhabited planets.

The Ark also has the capability to hyperspace to other planets, scan planets for defences, destroy planets and teleport aliens to an area known as the Fridgitorium, for disintegration or transportation to another planet. An alien can only be teleported to the Ark after it has consented to do so.

== Development ==
Captain Blood was developed jointly by Didier Bouchon and Philippe Ulrich, both contributing design and scenario, and Bouchon graphics and programming for the Atari ST version. Bouchon originally designed covers for ERE informatique's Gazoline Software label, but he learned to program in assembly language for the Atari ST after Ulrich provided him with an assembler. Bouchon then created fractal-generated realtime graphics that inspired both to do a sci-fi inspired video game.

After ERE's absorption by Infogrames in the summer of 1987 (partly justified by preliminary versions of Captain Blood), Ulrich and Bouchon isolated themselves in the Landes in order to have the game ready for Christmas. Many adaptations for both 16-bit and 8-bit machines were developed in successive months, although they were straight ports of the original Atari ST version in graphics, sound effects or music.

== Reception ==
Computer Gaming World gave the game a positive review for its unusual concept, execution, and graphics. Orson Scott Card praised Captain Blood's EGA graphics and science-fiction story, but wrote in Compute! that "as a game, this one sucks pond scum", citing a poor interface and obscure game play. Info magazine—January/February 1989—gave the game 5 out of 5 stars, remarking: "Captain Blood is a marvelously alien experience. The graphics & sound are first rate. The more we played, the more we wanted to continue playing, if only to meet more aliens. There is a fully realized universe here that's easy to become completely immersed in."

Captain Blood sold more than 100,000 copies worldwide.

== Legacy ==
Captain Blood was followed by the sequel Commander Blood in 1994 and later by Big Bug Bang in 1997, a French-only release.

Captain Blood has been described as an influence for the 2023 video game Chants of Sennaar.
