= Versailles II: Testament of the King =

2001 video game

- Developer: Cryo Interactive
- Publishers: Cryo Interactive; Réunion des Musées Nationaux
- Series: Versailles
- Platform: Windows
- Release: November 14, 2001
- Genre: Adventure
- Mode: Single-player

Versailles II: Testament of the King (French: Versailles II: Le Testament) is a video game released in 2001. It was developed by Cryo Interactive and co-published by Cryo and Réunion des Musées Nationaux for Windows-based PCs. It is the sequel to the 1996 game Versailles 1685.

The game is set in 1700, 15 years after the previous game, at the time of the death of Charles II of Spain. The player assumes the role of Charles-Louis de Farevolles, who turns up at the Court of Louis XIV, with neither influence at Court nor money.

A 25 piece orchestra, led by Skip Sempé, performs an hour of music for the game.

== Plot ==
The game starts in 1700, when the main character Charles-Louis de Faverolles comes back to Versailles after being a page at Grand Ecuries under Monsieur Boisseuil and advanced school, in hopes of becoming a diplomat to Spain, as he wishes to be reunited with Elvira Malaga y Santiago, his childhood sweetheart. The Court is involved in the succession to the throne of Spain since Charles II is ailing and has no heir. Both France and the Habsburgs hope that one of their own will be named. In order to launch his diplomatic career in the court, Charles-Louis must encounter different challenges and at first make a few favours for important people.

At first, unable to meet his protector Boisseuilh, yet unemployed and short of coin, Charles-Louis is forced to stay at the Pelican Inn, close to the Grand Commun. After few minor adventures, Charles-Louis does a favor to Marquis de Torcy, the Foreign Affairs Minister. Disappointingly it has no impact to his starting career and first experience of surrounding court members is quite unwelcoming. Things go forward as Charles-Louis is acquainted to Lhuillier, the assistant building inspector to François Mansart. However, his new friend involves Charles-Louis in suspicious affair: a guard walks in and Lhuillier hands him a diamond and rushes out in a panic. To make it even worse, Charles-Louis loses the diamond by Teetotum game. Next morning, clueless of what happened, Lhuillier introduces Charles-Louis as possible assistant to him and Mansart is in agreement. Mansart wants Charles-Louis to take Marquis Castel dos Rios, the Spanish Ambassador around the garden of Versailles. The Ambassador knows of Charles-Louis love for Elvira Malaga y Santiago and is decided to help him. The pleasant mood is disturbed by worried Lhuillier, who asks to visit him. This is the point, in which the player must decide whether to win back the diamond, or to inform Lhuillier about its loss - the wrong solution may end the game. Lhuillier is under arrest in his room and states that you must give the diamond back to the Dauphin or one of his sons. The Dauphin is in Meudon with two of his sons and only the Duc d'Anjou is in Versailles. He can be found at Encelade garden; however, the guard won't let Charles near him. The Spanish Ambassador might be the one to give the diamond to the Duc d'Anjou since he is the one in favor at the moment. At the result, Lhuillier is spared for the theft of the Buckle diamond, but is dismissed, and Faverolles is given his position.

After doing some work in the gardens, Charles-Louis Faverolles is again involved in court intrigues. Charles-Louis is acquainted with mysterious lady in green, Prosperine, whom he had shortly met at the very beginning of the game. She gives him a letter and wants to meet at the Ballroom grove later to inform him about the secret she overheard visiting Françoise d'Aubigné, Marquise de Maintenon. However, reaching her is difficult, as the grove is limited to special visitors only. On the end Prosperine gives him a sealed letter to read at home alone and to be burned afterwards. The letter claims that the King Louis XIV signed a secret treaty to divide the Spanish kingdoms with England and Holland. The player must decide whether to burn or not burn the letter – the wrong decision will end the game later in the game play.

== Critical reception ==
Tom Houston of Just Adventure thought the game would appeal to fans of the edutainment genre. Jihem of JeuxVideo described the title as "easy-gaming" - the gaming equivalent of easy listening.
