= The Raven Project =

1995 video game

- Developer: Cryo Interactive
- Publishers: Mindscape (MS-DOS); Cryo Interactive (PlayStation)
- Composer: Jean Michel Toulon
- Platforms: MS-DOS, PlayStation
- Release: 1995: MS-DOS; 1997: PlayStation
- Genre: Action

The Raven Project is a 1995 science fiction action video game developed by Cryo Interactive for MS-DOS. A port to the PlayStation console was released in 1997.

== Plot ==
In the distant future, humanity has been enslaved by an alien people and is on the verge of extinction. The player embodies a pilot who joins the human rebellion, hoping to finally push back the invader.

== Gameplay ==
The Raven Project is a space combat game in the lineage of Star Wars: Rebel Assault from LucasArts released two years earlier. The player controls different gears (spaceships, ground combat robots) in subjective view: the screen displays the cockpit of the craft and the main commands are at the bottom of the screen. The player moves in various environments and must complete a series of missions. The missions are introduced by cinematic scenes shot with real actors.

== Reception ==
IGN felt the game contained "crappy FMV nonsense". Electric Play thought while the game had a good concept at its core, it was let down by bad execution. Russian technology site Itkvariat thought the game won the hearts and minds of space shooter connoisseurs.
