= Treasure Hunter (video game) =

1997 video game

- Developer: Cryo Interactive Entertainment
- Publishers: Philips Média France; Microfolie's
- Platform: Windows
- Release: 1997
- Genres: Adventure, Educational

Treasure Hunter (French: Chasseur de Trésors) is a 1997 educational video game. It was never released in North America.

== Plot ==
You play a character named Tuck Pinkleton from the North American village Golden Greek whose uncle has run out of funds and is unable to open his maritime museum exhibit. To solve the problem, Tuck decides to go on an expedition to shipwrecks to claim the wealth of underwater treasure. The game takes place in five missions, in which the player does tasks like research the wreck, and obtain a crew. Three of the cases see the player travel to Spain, Malta, and Madagascar. The actual exploration of the wreck is shown by slideshows.

== Gameplay ==
The top of the window shows the numbers of days and amount of funds left. The player navigates using a directional cursor. The bottom of the interface has the player's inventory, travel button, and computer.

== Critical reception ==
Tom Houston of Just Adventure gave the game a glowing review, despite the game not being published in the United States; he noted "you'll have to find the game or petition Cryo and Dreamcatcher to make Treasure Hunter available".
