= 360: Three Sixty =

1999 video game

- Developer: Smart Dog
- Publisher: Cryo Interactive
- Platform: PlayStation
- Release: EU: July 1999
- Genres: Racing, shoot 'em up
- Modes: Single-player, multiplayer

360: Three Sixty is a 1999 racing video game for the PlayStation developed by Smart Dog and published in Europe by Cryo Interactive. Players compete in combatative races on futuristic hoverbikes set across water, using weapons as power-ups to destroy other racers. The game features a camera system allowing for 360 degrees of rotation to target competitors from behind. Upon release, 360 received negative reviews, with critics considering the game's fast pace limited the value of its gameplay and camera features, and faulting its visual presentation and sound.

== Gameplay ==
Gameplay screenshot

Set in a post-apocalyptic world after a worldwide flood, players of 360 race in futuristic hoverbikes over water-based courses. Racing gameplay features eight ships with different speed, acceleration, agility and armour levels. The game features four environments, each with three stages to race on, consisting of a marshland named Water World, an ice sheet named Ice World, a frozen ocean on Sea Bed, and volcanic Lava World. Players can adjust the camera in three modes of perspective, and freely rotate 360 degrees using the shoulder buttons of the controller to target and shoot at competing racers from behind with a machine gun. Driving into special symbols provide offensive and defensive power-ups, such as weapons including mines, rockets, missiles, torpedoes and cannons, and boosts and shields to protect against competitors. The game features a Arcade, Tournament, Time Trial and a Battle multiplayer mode played in split screen with two players. Arcade mode consists of single races against up to five computer-controlled opponents, and Time Trial is a race against the clock on the selected course. In Tournament mode, players complete a series of twelve races in stages of three, and in between enter an Arena Battle, where they must be the first to destroy their competitors ten times to advance to the next stage.

== Reception ==
Reception

Review scores
Publication	Score
Computer and Video Games	1/5
Jeuxvideo.com	10/20
PlayStation Official Magazine – UK	2/10
Video Games (DE)	58%
Extreme PlayStation	82%

360: Three Sixty was met with an unfavourable critical reception upon release. Jeuxvideo praised the fluid and smooth performance of the game's 3D engine, but considered this came at the cost of an "inconsistent" visual presentation across tracks, also feeling its "downright impossible" difficulty, "uninspired" sound and music, and combat system were "major flaws". Describing the graphics as "shoddy" and the controls as "sloppy", Official UK PlayStation Magazine faulted the game's premise, stating that players would not be able to navigate in a race whilst rotating the camera to shoot enemies in the opposite direction. Video Games similarly found the camera was "simply impractical" to make use of the machine gun due to the "vague controls" and "narrow and branching tracks". Computer & Video Games dismissed the title as a "feeble rip-off" of Wipeout, faulting its "terrible physics" and "scabby graphics and sound". In a positive review Extreme PlayStation noted it took time to adjust to the limited range of weapons and driving style, but felt it was "worth it", highlighting the game's "cleverly designed" tracks, "interesting and balanced" variety of weapons and fluidity of the gameplay.
