= The 3rd Millennium =

1997 video game

- Developer: Cryo Interactive
- Publisher: Cryo Interactive
- Release: 1997
- Genres: Simulation, Strategy

The 3rd Millennium (French: Le 3e Millénaire) is a 1997 simulation strategy game by Cryo Interactive.

== Plot and gameplay ==
The player is a political leader in the year 2001. The world is divided into 31 different states over 5 large countries. Their task is to become ruler of the world by the year 2500.

The gameplay is similar to other 4X strategies like the Civilization series. The isometric world map is accurate to 2500 square kilometres. The game is management first, and storyline second.

== Production ==
The 3rd Millennium came out in France in 1997, and in early 1998 in the United States.

The representation of the game's elements is based on "actual census, socio-economic and ecological projections for the period 2000 to 2500". While the game is serious and accurate in terms of data, the developers added humour and political incorrectness to ensure the player did not take the game too seriously. According to producer Stephan Ressot, there is no combat in the game because he didn't think conquering entire continents with military power was realistic in the modern world.

== Critical reception ==
PC Powerplay gave the game a rating of 52%. PC Player gave it 38%.

Cyro Interactive believes that the game failed to make an impact in Japan as the culture does not understand a "game of political intrigue with humour". PC Zone felt that while the game's soundscape was "undeniably clever and surprisingly atmospheric", its gameplay was boring. Avoc compared the title to Maxis' real-time strategy and management hybrid Sim City.
