= ZeroZone =

1998 video game

- Developer: Cryo Interactive
- Publishers: R&P Electronic Media
- Platform: Microsoft Windows
- Release: EU: 1998
- Genre: Graphic adventure
- Mode: Single-player

ZeroZone is a graphic adventure game developed by Cryo Interactive and published by R&P Electronic Media in 1998 for Microsoft Windows. In the game, the player plays a character who must unravel the truth about his father's death.

== Plot ==
Players play as Stan Gonzo, who receives a will from his father, whom he has never met. Stan assumes his father's role as leader of the largest cybertechnology company, the Kanary, and tries to unravel how his dad died, who he was, and what to do next.

The game starts when Stan is already sitting in his office in the Kanary where a police officer asks if he has any information to further the investigation into his father's murder.

Stan's own investigation starts by looking around the Kanary and meeting the rest of his family.

== Gameplay ==
Players move around the ZeroZone virtual world through a semi-3D interface that lets players look 360 degrees around with panorama-like scenery. Players move around by clicking a section of the panorama image to go to another semi-3D panorama scene; the game advances in the same style.

Game obstacles are mainly solving puzzles, finding clues and talking and interacting with other people. Some first-person shooter action comes around every now and then, but this is more to further the plot than true fighting.

The ZeroZone world is quite large, with many places to visit. Players can communicate with almost all people in the game, and often they reveal clues or give hints on what to do next.

== Reception ==
When the game was released, it was criticised for having low-quality graphics, yet some reviewers said the plot and music created the right setting for enjoyment. Another noticeable drawback is the seemingly buggy code, which can make the game crash for no apparent reason.
