= Asterix & Obelix Take On Caesar (video game) =

- Developers: Tek 5 (PS1/PC); Cryo Interactive (GBC)
- Publisher: Cryo Interactive
- Series: Asterix & Obelix
- Platforms: PlayStation, PC, Game Boy Color
- Release: PlayStation: EU: 1 June 2000; Game Boy Color: EU: August 2000; Windows: EU: 6 November 2000
- Genre: Action
- Modes: Single-player, multiplayer

Asterix & Obelix Take On Caesar (French: Astérix & Obélix contre César) is a 2000 action video game published by Cryo Interactive for PlayStation, Game Boy Color and the PC.

== Gameplay ==
The video game is based on the film Asterix & Obelix vs. Caesar.

== Reception ==
According to French newspaper Les Échos, Cryo's Asterix & Obelix game was a commercial hit, with sales of 200,000 units on the PlayStation by December 1999. By April 2000, this number had risen to 300,000 units.

GameGuru was critical to its "simple" and "boring" gameplay, citing the example in which the players have to catch flying objects (such as fish or baked pigs) and bring them to the table in Gaul's village. Likewise, Hardcore Gaming 101 was critical to its "repetitive" gameplay "based on running and fetching objects", such as "serving wild boars to village people" or "fetching misteltoes from trees".
