= Purple Saturn Day =

1989 video game

- Developers: ERE Informatique; Exxos
- Publisher: Epyx
- Designer: Rémi Herbulot
- Programmer: Fabrice Decroix
- Artist: Didier Bouchon
- Composer: Stéphane Picq
- Platforms: Amiga, Amstrad CPC, Atari ST, MS-DOS, ZX Spectrum
- Release: 1989
- Genre: Sports
- Mode: Single-player

Purple Saturn Day is a space-themed Olympic sports game. It was created by ERE Informatique and published by Epyx in 1989.

== Gameplay ==
The game features four non-existent sci-fi themed Olympic games, in the vein of Epyx games like Summer Games (1984). The four events are Ring Chase, Tronic Slider, Brain Bowler, and Time Jump. The events can be practiced on their own, or played one after another in tournament mode, where if the player wins they get to see the queen of the tournament do a short dance around a pole.

== Reception ==
Reception

Award
Publication	Award
Amstrad Action	Mastergame

ST/Amiga Format magazine gave the game high praise, awarding it a review score of 98%, and included a demo of the game on the magazine's coverdisk.
