= Chris Colorado =

- Promotional poster
- Created by: Thibaut Chatel; Franck Bertrand; Jacqueline Monsigny
- Directed by: Thibaut Chatel; Dominique Etchecopar
- Voices of: David Gasman; Paul Bandey; Ed Marcus; Sharon Mann; Jodie Forrest
- Composer: Fabrice Aboulker
- Country of origin: France
- Original language: French
- No. of episodes: 26

Production
- Executive producers: Thibaut Chatel; Frederik Range
- Editor: Valerie Dabos
- Running time: 26 minutes
- Production companies: AB Productions; Studio Animage; Mediaset

Original release
- Network: France 3; Canal+
- Release: 2000

Chris Colorado is a French animated television series consisting of 26 episodes, created by Thibaut Chatel, Franck Bertrand and Jacqueline Monsigny, produced by AB Productions, Studio Animage, Canal+, France 3 and Mediaset with the participation of Centre National de la Cinematographie, with original series music written by Fabrice Aboulker. It was first aired in France on 18 December 2000 on Canal+, and later on FR3, and it is broadcast regularly on the Mangas channel.

Each episode is approximately 26 minutes long. DVD copies of the show are almost impossible to find, as it had a very low release rate. One DVD containing the first four episodes has been released in France.

== Synopsis ==
Chris Colorado takes place on an apocalyptic future Earth. After a data-processing software bug prevents mankind from detecting the fall of a meteorite, it results in the destruction of nearly all life on Earth in a massive disaster later known as The Great Crash. After some time, many groups of survivors gathered together to try to rebuild and create a newer, more peaceful society, and formed "The World Federation". After several decades of peace, a mysterious dictator called Thanatos, a human wearing a helmet to conceal his face, with an army of humans converted into cyborgs called Thanors, started The Mega War, which ended with Thanatos taking control of Europe. However one group, "The Centurions of Freedom", led by Commander Richard Julian, succeeded in striking back and defeating Thanatos, who seemed to take refuge in what remained of Glorious City (Earth's first world capital, now mostly destroyed by the meteorite) where a strange black liquid from the meteorite, now called "Dark Torrent" by the Centurions, enabled him to recruit a new army of Thanors out of the survivors still living in the ruins of the city and start a constant skirmish-war against the World Federation.

The story begins with Captain Chris Colorado, a sporting, intelligent and world-weary former soldier, who is recruited by World Federation Commander Richard Julian, who proceeds to reveal to Chris that he is the son of William-Erwin Krantz, a famous member of the Centurions of Freedom charged to infiltrate Thanatos's army and gather information but went missing and presumed to have defected to the enemy. This had left many, including Chris himself, to despise him as a traitor. Though initially reluctant, Chris accepts the job as Julian's primary secret agent in the war against Thanatos because of his need to search for the truth. This will involve Chris in increasingly dangerous adventures where various meetings with mysterious individuals will reveal the truth to him about his father, his family and the shocking secret behind The Great Crash itself.

== Main characters ==
=== Chris Colorado ===
The main character, he is one of the World Federation's best soldiers and is an expert pilot. He is also an accomplished expert of martial arts and has a doctorate of law and science. His main fear is that of rats. It was revealed that he was forced out of the army after a secret group of high-ranking soldiers, who feared Chris might defect to Thanatos's side and reveal critical World Federation information just as his father had, and planted evidence of Chris stealing top-secret plans. He has been living in the house of his grandfather, Samuel Colorado, which is located at the bottom of Grand Canyon. He was eventually caught up by his past, and agrees to become the primary agent of World Commander Richard Julian, all the while trying to discover the truth behind his father and himself.

=== Chippowok ===
An Apache of the Hopi tribe, he is the childhood friend and primary ally of Chris Colorado. Originating in a village located on the surface of the Grand Canyon, not very far from the house of Sam Colorado, they met when Chris fled a squad of Thanors coming to capture himself and his family. Chippowok, having saved his life after having finding Chris lost in the desert at the bottom of the canyon, then became the guardian angel of Chris, Though he is faithful to the tradition of his people, he hates any mention of his real name ("Heart of Thunder") and normally be expresses his tribe's sayings often such as "the bold wind can blow harder on the fire, but it still burns" or even "the scorpion always looks through lies". He serves as Chris's partner as Chris goes on his journey of self-discovery about his family. He is later revealed to love Chris's sister; Victoria (but now renamed Jennifer).

=== Richard Julian ===
A commander of the Centurions of Freedom who defeated the dictatorship of Thanatos. He knew William-Erwin Krantz well, and entrusted him with a mission to infiltrate Thanatos's army and gather information. Later he was elected World Commander and therefore leader of The World Federation, with a new world capital in Chichen Itza.

=== Jenifer Julian ===
The daughter of Richard Julian. Later it is revealed that Jenifer Julian is Victoria Krantz, the sister of Chris Colorado.

=== Rebecca Wong ===
Rebecca Wong is the secretary and main advisor to Commander Julian. She appears cold and distant, primarily from a past injury that forced her to have her arms surgically amputated and replaced with robotic implants. Her past remains a mystery, but what is known is that her real name was Lily and that she was a political extremist and member of Steel Axe, a radical political faction that was forcibly disbanded by Commander Julian after they contested him for office. She normally comes into conflict with Chris Colorado, as she doesn't know his intentions towards her employer. Eventually they come to understand they are on the same side, and agree to trust each other and help one another for the good of the World Federation. She steadily becomes more romantically attracted towards him after the numerous encounters.

=== The Thanors ===
Recruited by force by Thanatos, they were originally humans who were captured by Thanatos and underwent severe brain-washing and physical transformation into cyborgs ready to fight in Thanatos's name. They thus do not hesitate to commit suicide rather than to fall to the hands from the enemy. To this end, they have had a button installed behind the temple which shuts down critical areas of the brain and plunges them in an induced coma (called catalepsy in the series). They are used as Thanatos's main army and are sent on various missions against their enemies. They have many spies inside the highest ranks of the World Federation and are the central enemy in the series. It is later revealed that a "Supreme Thanor" exists as the commander of the entire Thanor army and acts as Thanatos's second-in-command. Chris is perplexed by the fact he bears an extremely strong resemblance to himself.

=== Thanatos ===
Thanatos is the mysterious dictator and the leader of Thanors. He appears to have several psychic abilities that he draws from the Dark Torrent, a viscous black liquid emanating from the meteorite. Though nobody has seen what he looks like under his helmet, he seems to be well known to his enemies, especially Julian. It is later revealed that he's secretly planning for Chris to eventually join his cause.

== Cast ==
=== French Voices ===
- Emmanuel Curtil as Chris Colorado
- Dominique Paturel as Richard Julian
- Maïk Dara as Rebecca Wong
- Benoît Allemane as Contre-Amiral Jack Mitchell
- Pierre Hatet as Sénateur Herb Forsythe III, Gouverneur de Moscovie
- Marie-Martine Bisson as Loren Krantz
- Valérie de Vulpian as Jennifer Julian
- Thierry Desroses as Chippowak
- Med Hondo as Atabaska
- Henri Poirier as Sam Colorado
- Edgar Givry as Venceslas
- Daniel Beretta as William Erwin Krantz
- Sébastien Desjours as Vladimir
- Philippe Dumat as Gouverneur de Patanie
- Roger Carel as Professeur Amton
- Jean-Claude Montalban as Major Duval
- Elisabeth Fargeot as Annouchka Krantz
- Guillaume Lebon as Docteur Storm
- Laurent Morteau as Additional Voices

=== English Voices ===
- David Gasman: Chris Colorado, Vladimir, Doctor Storm, Additional Voices
- Paul Bandey: Richard Julian, Chippowok, Senator Herb Forsythe III, Additional Voices
- Ed Marcus: Samuel Krantz, Captain Jack Mitchell, Thanatos, Wenceslas, Additional Voices
- Sharon Mann: Rebecca Wong, Additional Voices

== Episodes ==
No.	Title
1	"The World Commander's Agent"
Commander Richard Julian travels back to the World Federation base in Chichen-Itza, when his aircraft the Falcon-One, has one of its engines explode mid flight. The crew decide to eject the Commander in a discharge glider. After launching an SOS, Richard arrives in the Forbidden Zone, where he is ambushed by a squadron of Thanors. Luckily a mysterious stranger comes to his rescue and leaves just as quickly. Returning to Chichen Itza, Richard instructs Rear Admiral of security: Jack Mitchell to find the stranger who saved his life in the Forbidden Zone. Richard recognizes the stranger as Chris Colorado.
2	"The Protected City"
3	"The Forbidden Zone"
4	"The Night of the Hopi"
5	"The Voyage of Liberty"
6	"The Woman Behind the Veil"
7	"The Glass Cube"
8	"The Great Crash"
9	"Vote for Julian"
10	"The Triumph of Thanatos"
11	"In Secret"
12	"The Mosais"
13	"False Appearance"
14	"Marubo"
15	"The Madness of Chris Colorado"
16	"Thanatos against Thanatos"
17	"The Lost Library"
18	"The Phantom of Chichen-Itza"
19	"Enemy Brothers"
20	"The Last Will of Annouchka Krantz"
21	"The Secret of Palenque"
22	"Women of the Desert"
23	"Man Hunt"
24	"Project Minotaur"
25	"Son of the Clone"
26	"The Destiny of Krantz"

== International broadcast ==
The series aired on Toonami in the United Kingdom starting in 2001, and rerunning through to 2004. The series has also shown on ABC iView in Australia, Club RTL in Belgium, VRAK.TV in Quebec, ProSieben and Kabel 1 in Germany, Cartoon Network in Poland, in Hungary and in Romania, Bulgarian National Television in Bulgaria, A1 TV in North Macedonia, Happy TV in Serbia, ETV in Estonia. It has also aired for a short while on the Arabian television network MBC's children division MBC3.
