= The New Adventures of the Time Machine =

2000 video game

- French cover art
- Developer: Cryo Interactive
- Publishers: EU: Cryo Interactive; NA: DreamCatcher Interactive
- Platform: Windows
- Release: FRA: April 2, 2000; UK: July 2000; NA: August 29, 2000
- Genre: Adventure
- Mode: Single-player

The New Adventures of the Time Machine (French: La Machine à Voyager Dans le Temps) is an adventure video game released in 2000, developed and published by Cryo Interactive. It is based on H. G. Wells' novella The Time Machine.

== Production ==
=== Design ===
During development the characters and backgrounds began as wire frames.

The game features real time 3D animation in pre-rendered sets, using the 'Warp' technology.

== Plot ==
A mythical being, a Demi-God, The Master of the Hourglass: Khronos, is the only one who can restore the balance of time, and help to find a time again.

== Reception ==
Market research firm PC Data reported North American retail sales of 11,252 copies for Time Machine during 2000. The firm tabulated another 18,097 retail sales of the game in North America during 2001, and 21,585 during the first six months of 2002. In 2003, its jewel case SKU secured 16,747 sales in the region.

GameSpot thought the game alternated between a "nonsensical story" and "infuriating puzzles". IGN felt that the game didn't push the boundaries for Cryo and tested player's patience. JeuxVideo praised the game's beauty and interactivity. Eurogamer praised the story and graphics and gave the game a 9/10. John Walker of Rock Paper Shotgun criticised the premise of making H. G. Wells the time traveling protagonist himself.
