= Persian Wars (video game) =

2001 video game

- Developer(s): Cryo Interactive Entertainment
- Publisher(s): Cryo Interactive Entertainment
- Platform(s): Microsoft Windows
- Release: FRA: May 14, 2001
- Genre(s): Strategy
- Mode(s): Single-player

Persian Wars is a 2001 video game created by Cryo Interactive Entertainment for Microsoft Windows.

== Plot ==
Based on the tales of the Arabian Nights, one plays as the young warrior Sinbad who wants the ring of King Solomon, which has fallen to Earth, for himself. The game features the Amazons, Bedouins and Ghûls, which can be joined and/or opposed by Sinbad.

== Gameplay ==
The game uses the same engine as Black Moon Chronicles. The player alternates between an overhead strategy map where they build and improve their army, and an on-the-ground view for missions.

== Critical reception ==
Jihem of JeuxVideo thought the game would appeal to lovers of the video game Diablo, and the strategy genre in general. Users from the website Game Pressure gave the game, on average, a score of 6.5, "mediocre" by the website's standards.
