= Odyssey: The Search for Ulysses =

2000 video game

- Developers: In Utero; Cryo Interactive
- Publishers: Cryo Interactive (Europe); DreamCatcher Interactive (North America)
- Engine: Cryogen
- Platform: Microsoft Windows
- Release: 2000

Odyssey: The Search for Ulysses (French: Odyssée : Sur les traces d'Ulysse) is a video game developed by In Utero and Cryo Interactive and released for Microsoft Windows in 2000.

== Development ==
The game uses the Cryogen engine, with characters who are able to move in real time 3D, in a pre-rendered environment.

== Plot ==
The game's universe stays faithful to Homer's the Odyssey, including its characters, Poseidon, Zeus, Cerberus and the Cyclops. Penelope, who has had no news of Ulysses for many years, requests that Heritias set off in search of his childhood friend. Heritias first goes to Troy, the last place the leader of the Achaean troops was seen. In the game, the player has to fight creatures like the Gorgon and the Cyclops and you will have to foil the manipulation of the gods to escape from the conspiracy of Poseidon's agents, and resist the seductive enchantress.

== Critical reception ==
Reception

Review score
| Publication | Score |
|---|---|
| The Electric Playground | 6.75/10 |

The game has a Metacritic rating of 58% based on 7 critic reviews.

GameSpot said " Though its problems might be frustrating at first, once you settle into the game, you'll be in for a suitably rewarding adventure. " Electric Playground said "A good mythological storyline goes a long way towards making a sometimes-frustrating game a whole lot of fun. " Eurogamer said "The game looks and sounds excellent, but is let down badly by simplistic puzzles, fussy location routes, and it's [sic] essentially linear nature. " IGN said "By the time I had spent a few days wandering around the world of Odyssey, I was sure I never wanted to return. " Gamezone said "It's not revolutionary, nor is it total garbage, but it is hard." Quandary said "My first impressions were not good. Having worked my way through a confusing set of options screens, I was confronted by the game interface. Fifteen minutes later I was ready to quit." All Game Guide said "An awkward interface, combined with a limited plot, makes for an unfulfilling rote adventure."

Just Adventure said "If you have ever wanted to captain a flying ship, be a passenger in Charon's sloop, or be tested by Poseidon, then Odyssey is a must-have for your adventure collection. Now if you will excuse me, after conquering the combined malicious and devious forces of gods and monsters alike, I feel I deserve some R&R. If I can only remember where I earlier encountered that charming young "lady."" UHS said "I'm sure there are people out there who will like Odyssey: The Search for Ulysses. I just happen not to be one of them. Although Odyssey tells a decent story, I didn't think it was much fun to play -- a poor interface and too many puzzles that kill your character for a wrong choice make this the kind of game that can easily try your patience."
