= Pax Corpus =

1997 video game

- Developer: Cryo Interactive Entertainment
- Publishers: Cryo Interactive Entertainment; Electronic Arts
- Platforms: PlayStation, Windows
- Release: 1997
- Genre: Action

Pax Corpus is a 1997 cyberpunk action and adventure video game developed and published by the French studio Cryo Interactive. It was released only in Europe for Windows PC and for the PlayStation console. It has often been likened to Tomb Raider.

== Plot ==
The game takes place in a cyberpunk sci-fi universe where the population is entirely made up of women; the men have all been killed, and the few survivors are mindless slaves. The reproduction of the population is ensured by the cloning technology of a powerful corporation, Alcyon, led by Kiyiana Soro. The player embodies a mercenary, Kahlee, who works for her own account. Kahlee comes to gradually unveil a dangerous project called Pax Corpus. Pax Corpus was created by Dr. Ellys on behalf of Kiyiana Soro. It is a terrible weapon which emits a radiation capable of taking away all freedom of thought from anyone exposed to it for too long; the people who are exposed to it are integrated into a collective entity subject to Alcyon. Kahlee must foil this plot, while maintaining a love-hate relationship with Kiyiana Soro.

== Gameplay ==
Pax Corpus is a third person action game, but includes an option to temporarily switch to first person vision. The player directs their character in a 3D environment, and must eliminate various enemies using several weapons. As the game progresses, the player levels up by finding flashcards that gain proficiency in new weapons.

== Development ==
The game was originally meant to adapt the MTV animated science fiction series Æon Flux, commissioned from Cryo Interactive by Viacom New Media, the video game division of MTV's parent company, Viacom. A beta version of the game was shown at the E3 convention in 1996, with the scenario inspired by the episode "The Demiurge".

The project was abandoned after Viacom acquired Spelling Entertainment and merged Viacom New Media into Spelling's Virgin Interactive, at which time all previous projects at Viacom New Media were canceled. With the game already in late development, Cryo changed the names of the characters and certain details of the universe to remove the copyrighted elements of Æon Flux, then published the game under the title Pax Corpus.

== Release and Reception ==
Pax Corpus was released in the United Kingdom in October 1997 and sold in various retailers and mail-order shops for £33.99. Even after release of the Game, many in Europe still expected Aeon Flux to be released, not realising Pax Corpus was based on it.

The Official UK PlayStation Magazine gave it a 2/10 in its final issue calling it "Tomb Raider in Space, but Crap"

Issue 35, August 1998 of UK Magazine PlayStation Plus gave the game 30% critiquing the graphics and lack of gameplay "No rational human can want games like this to exist. The controls are way bollocks, the combat's shite, the whole game's piss-ugly. A big fat waste of time."

The September 1998 issue of Extreme PlayStation Magazine gave Pax Corpus a 19% score with the author stating "I'm going to be brutally honest and say this game is the worst to ever be released on the PlayStation in its entire history" giving a score of 3 for Graphics, 6 for Sound, 2 for Gameplay and 3 for Lifespan.

Polish Video Game Magazine Gry Komputerowe gave the video game 35% in its October 1998 issue.

German Video Game Magazine Maniac gave Pax Corpus a slightly more positive score of 39% in its May 1998 issue.

French Magazine Console Plus gave a negative review and score of 21% in Issue 70.

Australian Magazine Hyper chose Pax Corpus as the Third Worst game (across all gaming platforms) of 1997–1998 in Issue 63.
