= Riverworld (video game) =

1998 video game

- Publisher: Cryo Interactive Entertainment
- Composer: Stéphane Picq
- Platform: Windows
- Release: NA: June 1998
- Genre: Strategy

Riverworld is a PC game released in 1998 by Cryo Interactive, based on the series of novels by Philip José Farmer.

In the game, the player takes the role of Richard Burton, the nineteenth century explorer. The game begins with a cinematic sequence showing what happens to Burton after he has died – how he comes to enter Riverworld.

Riverworld is a real time strategy game, similar to Microsoft's Age of Empires. Although Burton is the central character, it is seen from a third-person perspective, and other people within the game can be moved and controlled.

== Gameplay ==
The player begins with control of one territory along the River, with two opponents – shown in green and blue, and led by other historical figures - controlling other territories. These areas of land can be captured by gaining control of the central grail stone – a mushroom shaped object in the centre of each. More people can be recruited by building houses, for which building material needs to be collected. Towers can be built for defense purposes, barracks can be built to train soldiers, warehouses can be built to construct war machines, stores can be built to add building materials to stockpile, docks can be built to construct ships, workshops can be built to train people as engineers and scientists, and technology centres can be built in order to advance the civilisation.

The game begins in the Wood age, a very primitive time where wood from trees is the main resource. The game then advances, after completing sufficient technological research and recruiting a special sort of builder (e.g. Jules Verne from the Electric Age) to build a special structure to proceed to the next ages, including the Stone and Iron Ages to more modern ages (Steel, Uranium), and through to the future, with corresponding advances in technology and weaponry.

== Development ==
Riverworld was written entirely in assembly.

== Reception ==
Reception

Review score
Publication	Score
PC Gaming World	6/10

Game Over gave the game an overall rating of 65% and said that "RiverWorld brings a rich atmosphere to build a intuitive realtime strategy with some complex role playing concepts."

PC PowerPlay #31 gave Riverworld a score of 65.

According to Der Spiegel, Riverworld was commercially unsuccessful.

== Reviews ==
- Edge #65
- PC Zone - Aug 13, 2001
- PC Games - Nov, 1998
- GameStar - Nov, 1998
