= MegaRace =

1993 video game

- Developer: Cryo
- Publisher: The Software Toolworks
- Director: Rémi Herbulot
- Producers: Clive Fort; Steve Hutchins
- Designer: Florian Desforges
- Writer: Johan Robson
- Composer: Stéphane Picq
- Platforms: MS-DOS, Sega CD, 3DO
- Release: MS-DOS: EU: 1993; NA: 1993; Sega CD: NA: 1994; 3DO: NA: 1994; JP: October 7, 1994
- Genre: Vehicular combat
- Mode: Single-player

MegaRace is a vehicular combat game developed by Cryo for MS-DOS and published by The Software Toolworks in 1993. Ports to Sega CD and 3DO were released the following year. It uses pre-rendered 3-D graphics and includes over twenty minutes of full-motion video of fictional game show host Lance Boyle.

There are two sequels: MegaRace 2 and MegaRace 3.

== Plot ==
MegaRace takes place in the distant future, where the player is a contestant on a fictional game show and namesake, MegaRace. The program is broadcast on the fictional VWBT (Virtual World Broadcast Television) television channel, where contestants compete in a live-or-die race match against speed gangs. MegaRace's host is the eccentric Lance Boyle, portrayed by actor Christian Erickson. He guides the player throughout the game, introducing new levels and enemies, frequently discouraging them.

== Gameplay ==
MegaRace is a vehicular combat game with arcade-style gameplay, similar to that of RoadBlasters and Spy Hunter. However, it is also a rail shooter, in which players do not fully control the car; they can move it from side to side and accelerate within a limited range, but cannot turn nor fully stop the vehicle. This is because the speedway is rendered in full-motion video. The player must not only kill the opponents, but must also selectively avoid or run over "symbols" marked on the speedway itself. When driven over, these symbols temporarily improve or harm the car's performance.

The objective in MegaRace is to kill all of the speed-gang members in each race before three laps of the racetrack are completed. The first race starts with a small number of speed-gang punks, but more are added in each subsequent race. The player can dispatch opponents by slamming them into the sidewall of the track, hitting them with missiles mounted on the player's car, or passing them, causing the opponent's vehicle to explode after the gap between the two cars becomes too great. The player has a limited number of missiles for each race. If all opponents are not killed within three laps, the race is lost and the player must start again from their last saved game. If all opponents are successfully dispatched, the player moves on to the next race. If the player beats Lance Boyle's score (120,000 points), plays for a sufficiently long time, and comes in second, third or (occasionally) fourth, Lance will let him move on to the next track. Usually, coming in any position other than first either ends the game or forces the player to play the "Last-Chance Speedway".

The game has a total of eight cars and fourteen speedways across five worlds, not including two bonus races. The tracks differ in appearance between difficulty levels.

== Development ==
MegaRace features a techno chiptune soundtrack composed by Stéphane Picq of Dune.

Software Toolworks were working on an Amiga CD32 version of the game, but it was never released.

Microïds (Anuman Interactive's adventure games label), owners of the Cryo brand, made the game available on GOG.com on April 30, 2009, alongside MegaRace 2. It also received a version for OS X on June 18, 2013, via GOG.com.

== Reception ==
Reception

Review scores
Publication	Score
Computer and Video Games	75% (Sega CD)
Next Generation	4/5

Reviewing the 3DO version, GamePro commented that the controls are difficult, but that the fun gameplay and impressive graphics make up for it.

Next Generation reviewed the 3DO version of the game, rating it four stars out of five, and stated that "It would seem that every new piece of hardware needs to proves itself on a racing game, and this could be the 3DO game to compete with Daytona, Ridge, and Cruis'n. Good stuff."

James V. Trunzo reviewed MegaRace in White Wolf Inphobia #51 (Jan., 1995), rating it a 3 out of 5 and stated that "If you enjoy racing games, MegaRace is original and offers enough tracks and special road markings to guarantee initial enjoyment. The game show host should have his own sitcom; he's that good. The downside is that MegaRace becomes repetitive. Now if the enemy could shoot back!"

The game sold 330,000 units by September 1995. MegaRace was eventually added to publisher Mindscape's "Value Classic Series". The box art touted "Over 1.5 Million Sold!"

== Legacy ==
MegaRace also spawned two sequels, MegaRace 2 in 1996 and MegaRace 3 in 2001, the former uses the same pre-rendered method introduced in the original albeit with 3D polygon car models instead. The latter features full real-time 3-D graphics. Lance Boyle also returns for both sequels. MegaRace also came bundled with some Packard Bell, Quantex computers, Matrox video cards, and Gravis joysticks during the early to mid-1990s.

In April 2014, ZOOM Platform and Jordan Freeman Group announced conversions of the entire MegaRace Trilogy for mobile and tablet devices along with a reboot of the franchise on PCs, game consoles, mobile, and tablet devices. A teaser trailer followed two months later.
