= Salammbo: Battle for Carthage =

2002 video game

- European cover art
- Developers: Cryo Interactive; DreamCatcher Europe
- Publisher: The Adventure Company
- Producer: Thierry Miquel
- Designer: Alexis Lang
- Programmer: Jérôme Bignon
- Artists: Philippe Druillet; Grégoire Valayer
- Writer: Alexis Lang
- Platform: Windows
- Release: November 2002 (FR)
- Genre: Adventure game
- Mode: Single-player

Salammbo: Battle for Carthage (French: Salammbô) is a first-person adventure video game. It began development at Cryo Interactive, but the company went bankrupt during production. The Salammbo team was ultimately acquired by DreamCatcher Interactive, which finished the game's development.

== Plot ==
Salammbo: Battle for Carthage is an adaptation of Philippe Druillet's comic series Salammbô, itself adapted from the 1862 novel of the same name by Gustave Flaubert.

== Development ==
Salammbo was first announced by Cryo Interactive in July 2002. Many of its team members came from the developer's earlier Atlantis III: The New World (2001). However, Cryo entered a financial downward spiral and filed for bankruptcy protection that same month, leaving Salammbo unfinished. DreamCatcher Interactive ultimately bought sections of Cryo, including the Salammbo team, to form DreamCatcher Europe, and Salammbo resumed development under this new label.

Salammbo was released for Windows in France, in November 2002. Phillippe Druillet who was heavily involved in the game's development.

== Reception and legacy ==
The game was reviewed in 2004 in Dragon #319 by Clifford Horowitz in the "Silicon Sorcery" column. Horowitz commented that the game is heavy on problem solving and has an intriguing plot.

According to Lorraine Lue of DreamCatcher Interactive Europe, Salammbo was commercially unsuccessful, particularly in North America. She noted that "North American players didn't really associate very closely with the characters", a problem she traced back to the game's being "tailored to the French market". In summer 2003, DreamCatcher Europe opted to shutter the game development divisions it had carried over from Cryo. A group of those laid off founded Kheops Studio, led by Benoît Hozjan, in September 2003. Salammbo's designer Alexis Lang was among them. Most of Kheops had been involved in Egypt III (2004) before its development was interrupted, and so the team sought and received a contract from DreamCatcher to complete the game independently. Several members of Cryo's Atlantis team also migrated to Atlantis Interactive Entertainment—founded around September 2003—to work on Atlantis Evolution (2004), originally an in-house production by DreamCatcher Europe.
