= Egypt 1156 B.C. =

1997 adventure video game

Egypt 1156 B.C. – Tomb of the Pharaoh
- French edition cover art of Egypt
- Developer(s): Cryo Interactive Entertainment
- Publisher(s): Cryo Interactive Entertainment; Canal+ Multimedia; Réunion des Musées Nationaux; DreamCatcher Games (North America)
- Platform(s): Microsoft Windows; PlayStation
- Release: Windows: EU: 1997; NA: 1999; PlayStation: EU: 1999
- Genre(s): Adventure
- Mode(s): Single-player

Egypt 1156 B.C. – Tomb of the Pharaoh (French: Égypte: 1156 av. J.-C. - L'Énigme de la tombe royale) is a 1997 adventure video game co-published by Cryo Interactive Entertainment, Canal+ Multimedia and the Réunion des Musées Nationaux for the Microsoft Windows and PlayStation (PAL region only). It was later released in North America by DreamCatcher Interactive.

Egypt was a commercial hit, with sales of 550,000 units in Europe alone by December 2000.

== Synopsis ==
Ramosé, a young Theban, is on a mission to exonerate his father, who has been accused of pillaging the tomb of Seti I. In the vault at dawn, he unveils a stone showing a map of the tomb and a monkey, hinting to Hori, a former draughtsman. Ramosé then sets off to the village of Deir el-Medina where he finds Hori lying dead in his cellar, along with clues alluding to a carpenter bound for the embalmers' workshop, where he discovers a wider plot the next day. He skillfully manages to pass for one of the conspirators and is led to a tomb where a burial is being held. Ramosé descends to the funerary chamber. He is immured but manages to escape via a tunnel which leads him to the site of a tomb in construction of another noble, Panéhesy, where a mourner awaits him. She leads him to the villa of the noble, who has organized a large festivity. Passing for one of the guests, he finds a map of the Festival Hall of Thutmose III in Karnak. At the temple, Ramosé finds parts of the pillage and documents alleging Ptahnéfer, a close relative of the pharaoh. His father is exonerated.

== Development ==
Serious Games and Edutainment Applications suggests that the 1997 video game Versailles 1685, a pioneer in the "cultural entertainment" genre that merged entertainment with cultural education, paved the way for games such as Egypt.

== Reception ==
Reception

Review scores
| Publication | Score |
|---|---|
| PC Zone | 70/100 |
| UHS Hints | 1 star out of 5 |
| Feibel | Excellent |
| Just Adventure | C+ |
| Tap Repeatedly | 1 star out of 5 |
| Adventure Gamers | 2 stars out of 5 |
| Console News | 80% |
| Macledge | 4 stars out of 5 |
| JeuxVideo.com | 13/20 |
| Joypad (Playstation) | 5/10 |
| Joystick | 63% |
| The Av Vault | Mixed |
| Quandary | 2.5/5 |
| North Orange County Computer Club | Positive |

Egypt was a commercial success. French newspaper Les Échos reported its sales at 250,000 units by November 1998, and noted that it was among 1997's 10 best-selling computer games. According to Cryo Interactive, it sold above 500,000 copies by November 2000. Marketing manager Mattieu Saint-Dennis explained in December that Egypt's sales totaled 550,000 units in Europe alone, of which France accounted for 200,000 units. By February 2004, Egypt and its sequel, Egypt II, had achieved combined global sales above 700,000 units.

== Legacy ==
The game was followed by two sequels, Egypt II: The Heliopolis Prophecy and Egypt III.
