= Casanova: The Duel of the Black Rose =

2001 action adventure video game

- Developer: Arxel Tribe
- Publisher: Wanadoo Edition
- Platform: Windows
- Release: 1 June 2001

Casanova: The Duel of the Black Rose is a 2001 video game.

== Plot ==
The game revolves around the hijinks of swashbuckling rogue Giacomo Casanova in Venice, Italy during the Enlightenment Era.

== Gameplay ==
The interface using the keyboard and mouse. Players control the character movement using the arrow keys. They aim and fire their crossbow with the mouse. Adventure puzzles are solved through an inventory of items and character conversations.

The game contains a "seduction-based interface".

== Production ==
The game's Lead Game Designer was Bostjan Troha. Arxel Tribe invested $2m to finance the project, though company founder Guillaume de Fondaumière commented that developers in the United States might pay twice that; this meant they had to sell 500,000 to 2 million copies to break even.

By August 2001, Arxel Tribe was finishing up production of the title which was scheduled for European release in September by Wanadoo, however no US publisher or release date had yet been announced.

The game was released on April 16, 2003 in Poland. It was distributed in the Czech Republic by Dynamic Systems.

== Critical reception ==
Pilou of JeuxVideo said that while the game didn't live up to its contemporaries from a technical perspective, it was commendable for being based on an original concept. Adam Rodman of Just Adventure thought the game would appeal to male players who wanted to virtually charm female characters, but asserted that it didn't offer quality adventure gaming. 4Players deemed it a very conservative, unoriginal adventure. Multiplayer thought Casanova was a ridiculously amusing name for a video game. Przygodoskop noted the game's renaissance soundtrack. Igromania felt that the game was a middling project, but better than the work coming from Arxel Tribe and Wanadoo. Gamesurf felt the sound was the weakest quality of the game. Evolver felt the game's combat was instigated by plot contrivances. Sector thought the game had an interesting conclusion. Tiscali said that the experience felt like "walking through the game" without anything challenging or interesting happening.
