= MegaRace 2 =

1996 video game

- Developer: Cryo
- Publisher: Mindscape
- Series: MegaRace
- Platform: MS-DOS
- Release: NA: September 1996
- Genres: Vehicular combat, racing
- Mode: Single-player

MegaRace 2 is a vehicular combat racing game developed by Cryo for MS-DOS in 1996. It was published by Mindscape and is the first sequel of the original MegaRace, which was later followed by MegaRace 3.

This game features host Lance Boyle (played again by Christian Erickson), now joined by his assistant Lucinda (played by Alice Evans). The player is an "enforcer", attempting to win a series of races against computer opponents, by finishing in first place, or destroying their cars, automatically disqualifying them.

Microïds, owners of the Cryo brand, made the game available on GOG.com on April 30, 2009 alongside the first MegaRace. It also received a version for OS X on June 18, 2013 via GOG.com. It is now also available on Steam.

== Reception ==
Reception

Review score
Publication	Score
Power Unlimited	91%
