= The Devil Inside (video game) =

2000 video game

- North American cover art by Kurt Miller and Brian Weber
- Developer: Gamesquad
- Publishers: EU: Cryo Interactive; NA: TalonSoft
- Director: Hubert Chardot
- Producers: Jean-Martial Lefranc; Philippe Ulrich; Philippe Bayle
- Designer: Christophe Nazaret
- Programmers: Philippe Aubessard; Laurent P. Paret; Stéphane Chatellier
- Writer: Hubert Chardot
- Platform: Microsoft Windows
- Release: FRA: March 30, 2000; UK: May 26, 2000; NA: October 31, 2000
- Genres: Third-person shooter, survival horror
- Mode: Single-player

The Devil Inside is a horror-themed third-person shooter video game developed by Gamesquad and published by Cryo Interactive and TalonSoft for Microsoft Windows in 2000.

== Gameplay ==
Dave takes aim at a shotgun-wielding Electrocuted Criminal

The Devil Inside is presented as a reality television game show documenting the supernatural exploits of the protagonist Dave and his titular alter ego, a succubus named Deva. The player can transform between Dave and Deva by activating pentagrams located at certain places throughout the game's levels. During gameplay, Dave/Deva is followed by a small flying camera as well as a cameraman, and the player can switch between the two camera views as desired. Occasionally, a news helicopter will also be present and scripted cutscenes will be viewed from an aerial perspective.

The pacing, exploration, and puzzle factor of the game is similar to that of other survival horror titles. As Dave, the player has access to a variety of guns, which are equipped with laser sights to assist the player in aiming. As Deva, the player uses spells to attack enemies. Spells do not require ammunition, but do deplete mana that regenerates slowly. Some enemies generate souls when killed, and Deva can inhale souls to replenish her mana. Deva also has the ability to fly and regenerate health when standing in fire. The game uses a checkpoint save system represented by television sets found in-game.

== Development ==
The game's script was written by Hubert Chardot, better known for his work in the Alone in the Dark series. Its theme is similar to The Running Man, written by Stephen King, whose name is mentioned early in the game.

== Reception ==
Reception

Aggregate score
| Aggregator | Score |
|---|---|
| Metacritic | 76/100 |

Review scores
| Publication | Score |
|---|---|
| CNET Gamecenter | 6/10 |
| Computer Games Strategy Plus | 3.5/5 |
| Computer Gaming World | 2/5 |
| Eurogamer | 7/10 |
| GameSpot | 6.8/10 |
| GameZone | 7.5/10 |
| IGN | 8.1/10 |
| Jeuxvideo.com | 18/20 |
| Next Generation | 3/5 |
| PC Gamer (US) | 79% |
| The Guardian | 3/5 |

The game received "generally favorable reviews" according to the review aggregation website Metacritic.

GameSpot's Greg Kasavin cited difficulties with the control scheme. In regards to the game's action sequences, Kasavin opined that "some of the battles are scripted very well. [...] But other times, the combat is poor." The environments of the game were praised for their realism and atmosphere, while character models and sound effects were rated as plain. Overall, the game was described as competent but lacking polish. PC Gamer US praised the animations, camera angles, the use of a dual character, and the game's low learning curve. However, the reviewer cited "poor polygonal figures and texturing", and some environmental bugs as the low points of the game. Eric Bratcher of NextGen called it "A compelling 'Illbleed meets Space Channel 5' diversion, but the unique presentation can't cover the weaknesses in AI and puzzle design."

In Poland, it was one of the first of the series of cheap premiere releases in the ExtraGra magazine. Shortly after the game's release, one of Poland's most popular TV stations, TVN aired a report on the game, accusing the distributor, CD Projekt of selling satanic games in commonly accessible kiosks. The epilepsy warning, which by the time was already common among video games released in Poland and almost omnipresent in Europe, was used as an example of the game's exceptionally negative impact on young people.

According to Der Spiegel, The Devil Inside was commercially unsuccessful.
