= The Shadow of Zorro (video game) =

2001 video game

- Developer(s): In Utero
- Publisher(s): EU: Cryo Interactive; NA: DreamCatcher Interactive
- Platform(s): PlayStation 2, Windows
- Release: November 14, 2001
- Genre(s): Action-adventure
- Mode(s): Single-player

The Shadow of Zorro is a video game based on the character Zorro for PlayStation 2 and Windows. The game was published in North America by Dreamcatcher Entertainment.

== Gameplay ==
The Shadow of Zorro is a 3D stealth-adventure game, featuring 7 chapters, 700 animated cutscenes, and 28 different locations. Gameplay includes spying and rescue missions.

== Plot ==
A new garrison commander, Captain Fuertes, arrives at the village. Don Alejandro de la Vega suspects that he might be the "Butcher of Zaragoza", a Spanish war criminal who committed atrocities under Napoleon. In order to uncover the truth, Zorro sets out to investigate.

== Development and release ==
A website for the title was launched in mid 2001. Cryo and Dreamcatcher announced the game on October 3, 2001, to be released during the holiday season later that year. The game arrived in Polish stores on September 3, 2002.

== Critical reception ==
Shadow of Zorro has received generally poor reviews. Futuregamez.net awarded the game 49% stating that the game "seems very underdeveloped with poor level structures." Gry Online gave it a mixed review, though praised the Flash-based website for its ingenuity.
