= Arthur's Knights II: The Secret of Merlin =

2002 video game

- Cover art of Arthur's Knights II
- Developer(s): Cryo Interactive Entertainment
- Publisher(s): Wanadoo Edition; DreamCatcher Interactive
- Platform(s): Microsoft Windows
- Release: NA: April 2002
- Genre(s): Role-playing video game, third-person adventure
- Mode(s): Single-player

Arthur's Knights II: The Secret of Merlin (French: Les Chevaliers d'Arthur: Chapitre 2 - Le Secret de Merlin) is a 2001 adventure video game, developed by Cryo Interactive and published by Wanadoo Edition. Arthur's Knights II: The Secret of Merlin follows 2000's Arthur's Knights: Tales of Chivalry. The player takes the role of a knight of King Arthur.

== Reception ==
Reception

Review score
Publication	Score
The Electric Playground	7.5/10
