= Cyclemania =

1994 video game

- Developer(s): Compro Games
- Publisher(s): Accolade
- Designer(s): Ronnie Yaron
- Platform(s): MS-DOS; Windows
- Release: 1994
- Genre(s): Racing
- Mode(s): Single-player

Cyclemania is a motorcycle racing video game developed by Israeli studio Compro Games and published by Accolade in 1994 for MS-DOS. An emulated version was released for Microsoft Windows in 2020.

== Gameplay ==
The player must compete with other motorcyclists to be the first to cross the finish line while dodging a variety of roadway obstacles including cows, horses, slow moving cars, and oil spills. Each of the game's five race tracks uses digitized full motion video footage of Israeli public roads. The game graphics are split between a third-person view of the player character's motorcycle shot from behind and a lower window displaying its instrument panel.

== Reception ==
Computer Gaming World awarded the game three out of five stars. The magazine commended the game's effective use of animation and sound and its novel use of actual video footage, but criticized its lack of a replay value.
