= Versailles 1685 =

1997 video game

- Developer: Cryo Interactive Entertainment
- Publishers: Cryo Interactive Entertainment; Canal+ Multimedia; Réunion des Musées Nationaux
- Director: Sébastien Siraudeau
- Producer: Alain Le Diberder
- Platforms: Windows PC; PlayStation
- Release: 1997
- Genre: Adventure

Versailles 1685 (French: Versailles 1685 : Complot à la cour du Roi Soleil, also known as Versailles: A Game of Intrigue), is a video game released in 1997. The 3D adventure game was developed by Cryo Interactive Entertainment, and was jointly published by Cryo, Canal+ Multimedia and the Réunion des Musées Nationaux. It was followed in 2001 by Versailles II: Testament of the King.

The game revolves around Lalande, a young valet de chambre, who is called by Alexandre Bontemps in the early morning of the summer solstice 1685 after a strange pamphlet is discovered (which at the bottom figures a title of Aesop's Fables: "the frogs and Jupiter"), written by a schemer who threatens to set fire to the castle, all the while littering it with satirical pamphlets and clues which, if correctly pieced together, could save the castle from its potential fate. The player has until nightfall to investigate the castle and surrounding areas.

Versailles 1685 was a commercial success, with sales of 500,000 units in Europe alone by 2000.

== Plot ==
After attending King Louis XIV's awakening, Lalande starts his search in the antechambers. Under a large painting "Supper at Emaüs" he finds a small key in one of four pots. After eavesdropping on a conversation between Hardouin Mansart and Jean Racine he stumbles across Charles Lebrun, who asks him to look for his lost painting sketches which he needs later in the morning. In a downstairs dressing room, he finds a pair of scissors and a pamphlet in which Lebrun is satirized, with a peculiar hint lying at the bottom of the page. Upstairs he manages to open a sealed chest in an upper secluded blue boy bedroom, which exposed reads another of Aesop's titles: 'the hens and the chicks'.

While delivering an errand for Bontemps he is given a second pamphlet by the queen's usher, this time dispraising the royal family, with a series of numbers at the bottom. Lalande reports to Bontemps, then finds a key inside a cupboard, which he uses to open a buffet where he retrieves Lebrun's sketches. In one of the conversations in the Hall of Mirrors, an unknown courtier (in talk with the princess of Conti) is alluded to, potentially referred to as 'the marquis de Scaparella'. Lalande finds Lebrun in the war salon who, to his letdown tells him they are not his sketches. Lalande doubles back and is intercepted by the king's son who tells him that a deceitful drawing lay on top of the pile. Lebrun is reassured, thanks him and hands him another sketch from the pile which he once more claims isn't his. In front lies an artist's palette (from which the first pamphlet alluded to one of the colours), prevalent in the king's salon. Lalande reaches for a golden-coloured paintbrush and passes it over the sketch, whereby a third Aesop title is revealed: 'the birds and the kite'.

After attending the start of the noon mass, Lalande finds himself in the grand appartement, where he stands opposite a restricted "chamber of secrets" to which the guard tells him he can only enter with Bontemps' written permission. For the while, he makes his way through the cue of apartments, browsing for clues along the way. Running adjacently leftwards to the last three rooms is the minstrel's gallery (where Jean-Baptiste Lully) can be seen at work and that can only by accessed via a discreet locked doorway in the Apollo salon, which he manages to open by retrieving the key from a swiss guard at the bottom of the ambassador's staircase. Going left, he spots the unknown courtier inserting a key into a drawer across the Venus salon. In a partitions' booklet he remarks a scripture aimed at Lully, whom irritated, also remarks a particular writing style. Lalande implores him to decipher the hidden message - who agrees, for an errand in return. After two visits to Jean Racine (in talk with the marquise de Montespan above the ambassadors' fountain) - while having retrieved the second key and a third pamphlet along the way - Lully finishes the transcription, which reads: 'the mice and the hanging cat'. Lalande finds Bontemps in the courtyard, who grants him authorization to enter the chamber. Inside the small dark room stands a table with a set of medals (as mentioned in the second pamphlet - to which there is one exception) in the drawer, which he calks with a burin and paper picked up along the way. The king's brother lets him know that all medals bear carvings of Bourbon monarchs, except for Charles VIII - a Valois. On the medal is inscribed an unintelligible epigraph to which Lalande implores the aid of the marquis de Croissy.

In the ministers' wing, Lalande is left the lengthy translation of the epigraph from the marquis' desk (on which also lies the map of a fort). Referring to the numbers at the bottom of the second pamphlet he selects the letters by order of occurrence, unraveling yet another of Aesop's titles: 'the head and the wolf'. Browsing through the hoard of bookshelves he retrieves a fourth pamphlet, discrediting the marquis de Louvois and Vauban (the defense minister) that also hints toward three other maps of forts hidden in Louvois' office. Covered by Bontemps, Lalande is able to seep inside, where he finds the names of three towns in a drawer and an embedded vault of which the three four-digit code lines each seem to correspond to an event associated to the towns. With a spyglass, Lalande heads for the Hall of Mirrors, where he manages to get a glimpse of two of the dates on the ceiling. The three maps inside the vault, superposed to the one in the first office reveal another Aesop title: 'the fox and the crane'. Heading back to Bontemps he is intercepted by Madame de Maintenon who hands him yet a fifth pamphlet (a cloze text on the king's religious policy).

During the king's afternoon work session, Lalande seeks help from the Cardinal de Bouillon in the Grand appartement to fill in the gaps of the pamphlet (who manages to deduce "dragonnade", a term employed by the Protestants to describe the harsh royal repression measures). Lalande makes his way down to the sacristy of the chapel (to the left at the bottom of the ambassadors' staircase) where he finds a third key in one of the drawers with a paper depicting the king healing scrofula. With the help of the Père Lachaise he manages to fill in the remaining gaps; the underlined word particles yield yet another of Aesop's titles: 'the file and the dragon'. Lalande now turns his attention toward the hint at the bottom of the third pamphlet. Shedding light in the Jupiter salon and using a ladder to reach the scaffolding (intended for earlier purposes) he sights a small box trapped in the chandelier. Perhaps his most arduous task now awaits him. Unable to reach it, he begs Bontemps for assistance who gives him a key granting access to the mechanical framework above. Tensely making his way up the staircase behind the Apollo salon he reaches the attic pathway (where he also notices further along a big, suspicious overhanging large box; too far out to reach) and actuates the pulley. The luster falls with a loud crash. Relieved of having avoided the worst he collects the box and finds a lengthy paper inside, with eight sets of instructions (no doubt that each one corresponds to the eight Aesop titles gathered hitherto) that also mentions the presence of four keys spread around the castle, the last one hidden in an orange tree. After receiving a raw chiding from Bontemps he is invited to join the promenade.

Lalande is now in the orangery, earnestly in search of the fourth missing key, harrowing through the rows of orange pots, one by one, but all in vain. Conveying his disarray to André le Nôtre, the gardener reassures him that other orange trees lye in the Hall of Mirrors. Lalande approaches the Bosquet d'Esope, a labyrinth containing ornate fountains with one of Aesop's many fables displayed underneath. The paper instructs the reader with an eightfold task of selecting one or more letters, each from a given line and position of occurrence. Proceeding by order of titles gathered throughout the day, Lalande is somewhat baffled by the senseless of the string of letters obtained. In the rotunda at the far end of the grove, he comes across the Duc du Maine, lying in discomfort who implores for help, Lalande doubles back to the apothecary, relieves the duke, then retrieves a map eliciting the correct path in which the labyrinth is designed to be ambled through. Back from square one, then proceeding accordingly, Lalande is gladdened to retrieve a meaningful message.

After a cordial outdoor supper, the courtiers and courtesans are escorted back to the castle at nightfall. After the women wish goodnight to His Majesty, the sconce is handed as of custom to one of the visiting courtiers, the Marquis de Scaparella (whom Lalande recognizes); to all's horror he sets the hearth of the antechamber alight and after bidding them a good night, eludes his fellow courtiers. Lalande must act quickly to reach the bomb spotted earlier. He finds a ladle in the king's salon then harrows hurriedly through the remaining orange trees in the Hall of Mirrors. Managing to find the fourth and last key he dashes up the antechamber staircase, along the attic passageway. He manages to retrieve the bomb which he spotted earlier. Alleviated, he inserts the four keys and enters the phrase code, whereby the bomb deactivates.

Lalande is congratulated by His Majesty, who offers him the role of ambassador.

== Development ==
This gif shows a sample of the development process for each set. While the Ambassadors' Staircase was destroyed in 1752, the developers painstakingly reconstructed it using 800 documents from the archivists: Réunion des Musées Nationaux and Textuel publishers. The set was modeled using 3D Studio 4, then maps and textures were plotted in consultation with the Curator of the Museum of Versailles. Next, characters were placed into the space according to the storyboards. Lastly, the lights were added, and the virtual cameras were placed for the computer to render.

Through collaboration with the Museum of Versailles, the developers recreated the Palace of Versailles as it was during the reign of Louis XIV in computer-rendered form, a process that took over two years.

== Reception ==
Reception

Review scores
Publication	Score
Computer Games Strategy Plus	4/5
Computer Gaming World	2.5/5
Entertainment Weekly	A

Versailles 1685 was a commercial success, and sold 150,000 units in its first few months of release. According to French newspaper Les Échos, it sold 300,000 copies by late 1998. Cryo Interactive's marketing manager, Mattieu Saint-Dennis, reported 500,000 sales for Versailles in Europe alone by December 2000. Of this number, France accounted for 180,000 copies. By November 2001, Versailles had sold 450,000 units worldwide.

Kipp Cheng of Entertainment Weekly praised the "exquisite" 3D environments. GameSpot reviewer Laurel Wellman thought the game leant too much toward the scholarly side than in providing light gameplay. Heidi Fournier of Adventure Gamers thought it was both enchanting and mystical to explore Versailles through the game.
