= Mankind (video game) =

1998 video game

- Developer(s): since 2008 Quantex, 2004 - 2008 O2 Online Entertainment, formerly Vibes Online Gaming
- Publisher(s): since 2004 O2 Online Entertainment, formerly Cryo Interactive
- Designer(s): Frank de Luca, Oliver Poetzelberger
- Platform(s): Microsoft Windows
- Release: December 1998
- Genre(s): Massively multiplayer online real-time strategy

Mankind is a discontinued massively multiplayer online real-time strategy (MMORTS) computer game.

== Gameplay ==
Equipped with one construction unit, a Vibz-type starship, and a small amount of credits, players start out in a guarded star system ("Imperial system") to eventually create their own empire. Typical first steps in Mankind consist of building a small base on one of the nearby planets and mining available resources which could either be sold or used to construct further units. Later, a player can leave the safety of the Imperial systems behind and colonize his own star system.

=== Environments ===
Planet surfaces as well as the space in star systems are realized as separate two-dimensional square game maps, called "environments" in game jargon. While space maps have borders, planetary maps are virtually borderless - units leaving the map at the eastern border reappear in the west, those leaving in the north reappear in the south. Each environment can contain player units and installations. Some restrictions exist, such as land vehicles only being able to operate on planetary maps, or specific starships not being able to enter planetary environments. Only one environment per player can be active at a time. Players can switch between maps by loading the unit content of a new environment, thereby leaving the old one.

=== Game universe ===
The game takes place in the so-called "Mankind galaxy". The galactic map available for navigation is divided into sectors of space ("cubes" in game jargon), each of which might contain between zero and about 25 stars. Each star system contains between 5 and 8 planets. Early game reviews talked about a total sum of 900 million available planets, each with their own climate, seasons and population, a figure that was repeated in advertising text on the game box and even topped by the official website, which claimed several million systems and billions of planets.

In fact, a majority of these planets and star systems were unavailable ("closed") at the initial release of the game and have never been opened afterwards. During the two game resets since its release, the layout of the Mankind galaxy was changed and its size reduced. The last released galaxy consists of 73,251 star systems with 476,265 planets.

The persistent universe feature means that even when players are not involved in the game their mines extract ore, factories create equipment, ships continue commerce, and combat units continue to do battle. The game also has option to allow the user be notified via cell phone text message if their units came under attack.

== Development ==
Mankind was initially published in December 1998 by the French computer game developer Vibes Online Gaming. After the transfer of Vibes to its Asian partner, the game was bought by O2 Online Entertainment Ltd., it is being primarily maintained by Quantex Online Entertainment since 2008.

Estimates of the number of active players are hard to come by - while the official site claimed both 145,000 and "more than 200,000" players on the same page, these figures likely included inactive as well as trial accounts. According to an interview with an O2OE spokesman, barely 3,000 accounts were active in May 2003.

During the game rework of Quantex in early 2009, the graphic engine of Mankind was fully ported to DirectX 9 and full support for Windows Vista implemented. Further, dozens of small improvements were implemented.

In December 2015 the Mankind servers were shut down.

A newer version of the game, named Unity Space Conquest, is based on the original Mankind.
