= Hellboy: Dogs of the Night =

2000 video game

- Windows cover art
- Developers: Cryo Studios North America (PC); Hoplite Research, LLC (PS1)
- Publishers: Cryo Interactive (PC); Dreamcatcher Interactive (PS1)
- Platforms: Windows, PlayStation
- Release: Windows: EU: December 2000; PlayStation: NA: Spring 2003
- Genre: Action
- Mode: Single-player

Hellboy: Dogs of the Night is a 2000 American video game for the PC, developed by Cryo Studios. It was ported to the PlayStation as Hellboy: Asylum Seeker, developed by Hoplite Research and released in 2003. The Hellboy game is based on Dark Horse Comics' horror comic book series Hellboy, written and drawn by Mike Mignola.

== Gameplay ==
Players control Hellboy in a third-person perspective across six levels. Levels consist of separate stages broken up by puzzles and enemies that can differ across each. The game plays mainly as a graphic adventure where the player must solve puzzles in order to advance with some fights with enemies scattered throughout the game. To combat opponents, Hellboy uses either his fists including his stone "right hand of doom" or different weapons that can be found throughout the game including a torch, a gun, and a sword.

== Reception ==
The Windows version has a score of 11.50% at GameRankings. Jason Babler of the Official U.S. PlayStation Magazine (October 2003) rated the game 0.5 out of 5.
