= Egypt II: The Heliopolis Prophecy =

2000 video game

- Developer: Cryo Interactive
- Publishers: EU: Cryo Interactive; NA: DreamCatcher Interactive
- Directors: Yann Masson; Franck Letiec; Grégory Joseph; Yann Troadec
- Producers: Jean-Martial Lefranc; Philippe Ulrich
- Programmer: Grégory Joseph
- Artist: Franck Letiec
- Writer: Yann Masson
- Composer: Farid Russlan
- Platforms: Windows; PlayStation; Mac OS X
- Release: EU: September 27, 2000; NA: 2000; EU: May 2001 (PS1); WW: April 2012 (Mac)
- Genre: Adventure
- Mode: Single-player

Egypt 2: The Heliopolis Prophecy (French: Égypte II: La Prophétie d'Héliopolis) is an adventure video game developed and published by Cryo Interactive for the PC and PlayStation in 2000. It was released for Mac OS X in May 2012. Egypt 2 follows Egypt 1156 B.C. and is followed by Egypt III.

== Plot ==
The game is set in 1360 BC, and Heliopolis, the City of the Sun, has been struck by a plague. The player's father has also been infected. From a first-person perspective, the player must find a cure and save the father and the rest of Heliopolis.

== Reception ==
Reception

Review score
Publication	Score
Jeuxvideo.com	14/20

According to Cryo Interactive's marketing manager Mattieu Saint-Dennis, Egypt 2 sold 180,000 units in Europe alone by December 2000. Of this number, France accounted for 50,000 copies. The game and its predecessor, Egypt 1156 B.C., achieved combined global sales above 700,000 units by February 2004.

== Sequel ==
Following the 2002 bankruptcy and liquidation of Cryo Interactive, many of its key assets were purchased by DreamCatcher Interactive to form that company's new European branch. Two development teams, including that of the Egypt series, were among these acquisitions. DreamCatcher Europe was established in Paris in January 2003, and the publisher subsequently announced a sequel to Egypt II in April, under the names The Egyptian Prophecy (North America) and Egypt III: The Fate of Ramses (Europe). It was one of several announcements by the company in preparation for the 2003 Electronic Entertainment Expo (E3). Like the publisher's concurrent project Atlantis Evolution, Egypt III was developed internally by DreamCatcher Europe.

In the summer of 2003, DreamCatcher Europe shuttered the game development divisions it had carried over from Cryo. As a result, Egypt III "seemed destined for cancellation", Adventure Gamers' Johann Walter later noted. A group of those laid off proceeded to found the developer Kheops Studio, led by Benoît Hozjan. The new company opened in September. Since most of the team had already been involved in Egypt III before its development was interrupted, Kheops sought and received a contract from DreamCatcher to complete the game independently. Jeux Video reported in January 2004 that Egypt III had "quietly resumed development" and was nearing completion. The game was released in North America on March 29, 2004.

As Cryo had done for Egypt II, Kheops worked with archeologist Jean-Claude Golvin to increase historical accuracy. Egypt III was targeted primarily at casual gamers.

== See also ==
- Pompei: The Legend of Vesuvius
