= Arthur's Knights =

2000 role-playing video game

Arthur's Knights: Tales of Chivalry
- Developer: Cryo Interactive
- Publishers: EU: Cryo Interactive Wanadoo Edition; NA: DreamCatcher Interactive
- Platform: Windows
- Release: FRA: November 28, 2000; NA: July 16, 2001
- Genres: Role-playing, adventure
- Mode: Single-player

Arthur's Knights: Tales of Chivalry (French: Les Chevaliers d'Arthur: Chapitre 1 - Origines d'Excalibur) is an adventure role-playing video game developed by Cryo Interactive and released for Microsoft Windows in October 2000 in North America and November 2000 in Europe. The game's story revolves around the legendary King Arthur in medieval Britain. The player can choose to play the same main character, Bradwen, from either of two perspectives: as a Celt or as a Christian. In both storylines, Bradwen is the illegitimate son of the dying King Cadfanan, leader of the Atrebates tribe shortly following the Roman occupation. Bradwen's goal is to foil the attempts of his evil half-brother Morganor (heir to the throne) at securing a malevolent kingship for himself, through which enactment of his evil intentions will be made possible.

== Plot ==
Bradwen has two alternate paths that can be played through in Arthur's Knights: Tales of Chivalry. Prior to choosing which path shall be followed, the game opens with the player in control of a young page (newly a squire) who trots off to converse with a gentleman by the name of Master Foulque, who, it would appear, is a librarian and historiographer. After some discourse with Master Foulque, the player is presented with the choice of deciding between a red book and a white book (determining which story, Celtic or Christian, respectively, of Bradwen shall be told).

Both stories take place shortly after the departure of the Romans from Britain. This epoch marks a time in which Christianity has been somewhat imposed upon the native populace of Britain thus majorly extinguishing what in the game is described as "an age of Kings and Queens, Monsters and Magic" (not to mention fairies and otherwise traditionally Celtic and pagan concepts). Controversy erupts when the decampment of the Romans leaves the British tribes in conflict over political power (thus leaving them disunited and therefore vulnerable to their common enemies, the Saxons). The barbaric Saxons pose a particular threat to reestablishing a semblance of order in the land. Bradwen's role in all this is to embark on a series of missions when his half-brother informs him of the necessity for a cure for Cadfanan, their father and king.

Ultimately, both Bradwens encounter fairies, dragons, King Arthur, Merlin, and even the Devil during travels through Camelot, the mystical realm of Avalon, and a plethora of other lands. Bradwen also, regardless of the religion to which he cleaves, eventually seek justice against the treacherous actions of his half-brother which develop during gameplay. Throughout the game are interspersed some historical facts about Roman Britain, post-Roman Britain, tidbits on the legend of King Arthur, and several allusions to Marion Zimmer Bradley's novel The Mists of Avalon.

== Sequel ==
Arthur's Knights: Tales of Chivalry was followed in 2002 by Arthur's Knights II: The Secret of Merlin.
