= Quantex Microsystems =

American direct-PC manufacturer

- Industry: Personal Computer Manufacturer
- Founded: 1984; 41 years ago
- Founder: Min Yau Chang
- Defunct: August 17, 2000
- Fate: Bankruptcy
- Headquarters: Somerset, New Jersey, United States
- Key people: M. T. Chang, President
- Website: quantex.com at the Wayback Machine (archived 1999-04-27)

Quantex Microsystems was a direct-PC manufacturer based in Somerset, New Jersey, founded in 1984. Although it never matched the sales volumes of the largest PC retailers, their products met wide acceptance by customers.

In August 2000, it filed for Chapter 11 bankruptcy protection when its key supplier, Fountain Technologies, who also supplied computers for the Pionex, Inteva, and CyberMax brands, also filed for bankruptcy.

== Products ==
Quantex computers were built to a high standard, and regularly won awards in many computer publications until the company's bankruptcy. The company was known for its high build quality, great technical support and brand-name components, at a lower cost than most rivals.

== European operations ==
Quantex's European operations were based in Stevenage, UK. The UK operation continued operating normally for several months after the US company declared bankruptcy. In 2001, after its eventual closure, a company called Quantex Computers UK Ltd. started to advertise in UK computer magazines, operating for a further few months from the same location as the UK office of the original Quantex Microsystems, but denying any links to the old company.

== Company leaders ==
- M. T. Chang and Min Yau Chang – President and Co-Founder respectively
- Stan Swearingen, Jr. – former president and CEO
- Steven Markin – VP and General Counsel
