= Egypt III =

2004 video game

- Developer: Kheops Studio
- Publisher: The Adventure Company
- Designer: Laure Nollet
- Programmer: Matthieu Chopin
- Artists: Franck Letiec; Jean Lamoureux
- Writers: Laure Nollet; Alexia Lang
- Composers: Olivier Louvel; Benoît De Mesmay
- Platform: Windows
- Release: NA: March 30, 2004; EU: May 14, 2004
- Genre: Adventure
- Mode: Single-player

Egypt III: The Fate of Ramses (French: Égypte III: Le Destin de Ramsès), known as The Egyptian Prophecy in North America, is a 2004 graphic adventure game developed by Kheops Studio and published by The Adventure Company. The player must solve an array of ancient riddles that will help a dying Pharaoh survive and restore Egypt to glory. The game is the third and final game in the Egypt trilogy, following Egypt 1156 B.C. and Egypt II: The Heliopolis Prophecy. In 2010–2012, Microïds released an adaptation of the game called Egypt: The Prophecy, split into parts, for the Apple iPhone.

== Plot ==
At the age of sixty years, Pharaoh Ramesses II asks the Oracle of Amun to extend his reign; the God accepts, at the condition that a majestic obelisk is built before the Shemu season comes. Despite initial progress, the construction suddenly stops and Pharaoh sends one of his priestess, Maya, to investigate.

== Development ==
Following the 2002 bankruptcy and liquidation of Cryo Interactive, many of its key assets were purchased by DreamCatcher Interactive to form that company's new European branch. Two development teams, including the one behind Cryo's Egypt series, were among these acquisitions. DreamCatcher subsequently revealed the game in April 2003, under the name The Egyptian Prophecy in North America and Egypt III: The Fate of Ramses in Europe. It was among a slew of announcements by the company in preparation for the 2003 Electronic Entertainment Expo (E3). Initially, the game was developed internally by DreamCatcher Europe, but in the summer, DreamCatcher Europe shuttered the game development divisions it had carried over from Cryo. Adventure Gamers later noted that the game "seemed destined for cancellation".

A group of those laid off from DreamCatcher Europe, led by Benoît Hozjan, proceeded to found the independent developer Kheops Studio. According to Hozjan, most of the team had already been involved in the game before its development was interrupted, and Kheops received a contract from DreamCatcher to complete the game. Jeuxvideo.com noted that the game had "quietly resumed development" and was nearing completion by January 2004.

As Cryo had done for Egypt II, Kheops worked with archeologist Jean-Claude Golvin to increase historical accuracy. Unlike its predecessors, it was not created in collaboration with the Réunion des Musées Nationaux. The game was targeted primarily at casual gamers.

== Reception ==
Reception

Aggregate score
| Aggregator | Score |
|---|---|
| Metacritic | 73/100 |

Review scores
| Publication | Score |
|---|---|
| 4Players | 76% |
| Adventure Gamers | 3.5/5 |
| Computer Games Magazine | 4/5 |
| Gamekult | 4/10 |
| GameStar | 29% |
| Gamezebo | 70/100 |
| GameZone | 7.5/10 |
| Jeuxvideo.com | 14/20 |
| Joystick | 4/10 |
| MeriStation | 5/10 |
| PC Games (DE) | 63% |

The game received "mixed or average reviews" according to the review aggregation website Metacritic.

WorthPlaying recommended the game to Myst fans. Dan Ravipinto of Adventure Gamers criticised the game's cluttered environments and slow interface. Jeuxvideo.com thought the short and easy game would offer a pleasant Egyptian adventure for the player. David Caviness of Game Chronicles thought the game would only receive acclaim or interest from fans of the adventure game genre.
