= Philippe Ulrich =

French composer and programmer (born 1951)

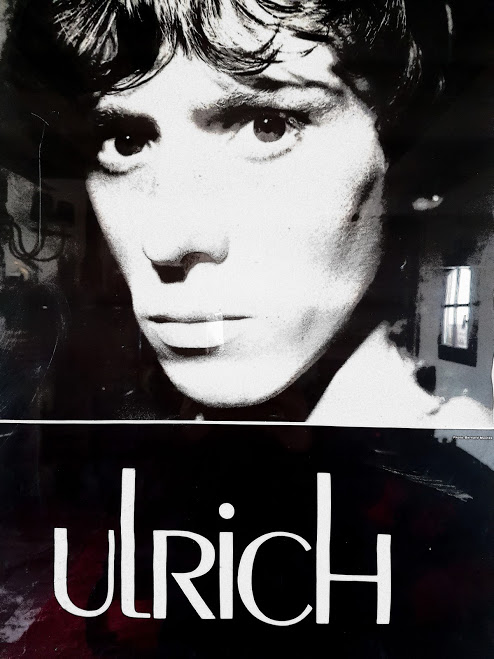
Philippe Ulrich in 1979

Philippe Ulrich (born 28 March 1951) is a French composer, producer, programmer, video game creator and entrepreneur.

In March 1999, he was made a knight of the French Ordre des Arts et des Lettres.
