= Cryo Interactive =

Former French video game development and publishing company

Cryo Interactive Entertainment
- Type: Private
- Industry: Video games
- Founded: Paris, France (1990)
- Defunct: October 2002
- Fate: Bankruptcy, assets acquired by DreamCatcher Interactive, later acquired by Microïds
- Headquarters: Paris, France
- Key people: Philippe Ulrich
- Products: Dune; MegaRace; Dragon Lore; Lost Eden; Atlantis: The Lost Tales

Cryo Interactive Entertainment was a French video game development and publishing company founded in 1990, but existing unofficially since 1989 as a developer group under the name Cryo. The company gained recognition for its adventure games, such as the commercially successful titles Dune, Dragon Lore and Atlantis: The Lost Tales, along with the racing series MegaRace.

== History ==
Cryo was formed by members of ERE Informatique who left Infogrames (proprietor of ERE since 1986) – among these were Philippe Ulrich, Rémi Herbulot and Jean-Martial Lefranc.

The first game developed under the Cryo Interactive moniker was the hit Dune, which granted the newly formed software company both publicity and funding for further games under Virgin until 1996, when Cryo started self-publishing inside the European market, and in North America through then partially owned Canadian publisher DreamCatcher Interactive.

Cryo made its name mostly through adaptations of already existing stories (such as Riverworld, based on Philip José Farmer's novel and Ubik by Philip K. Dick) or those based on historical scenarios (like KGB, a game set days before the dissolution of the Soviet Union and several games based in Ancient Egypt, Qing Dynasty's China and Louis XIV's France, developed with Cryo's Omni3D engine). Although most of the post-Virgin games managed to capture and stay true to the original settings, poor interfaces and the lack of worldwide distribution turned little profit from each game.

By 1997, Cryo had experienced success in the US and France, and wanted to expand into Japan. It had focused its efforts on the US because it was a big market, and experienced difficulties in Japan due to changing distributors between games. They considered creating different sets of characters for the three markets, and setting up a US-based subsidiary.

=== Cryo Networks ===
A Cryo Interactive subsidiary called Cryo Networks, aimed at developing and publishing online applications exclusively, was established in December 1997. Aside from online multiplayer games (Deo Gratias, FireTeam, Treasure Hunt 2001, Mankind and Scotland Yard being some of the titles released under this label), Cryo Networks also maintained a proprietary online multimedia development framework named SCOL (Standard Cryo On Line).

=== Cryo Studios North America ===
Cryo Studios North America was a video game design studio based in Portland, Oregon, USA, and was a subsidiary of Cryo Interactive. Cryo Studios was founded as Dark Horse Interactive (DHI) in the late 1990s, a joint venture of Cryo Interactive and Dark Horse Comics, and based in Dark Horse's headquarters in Milwaukie, Oregon. In 1999, Cryo Interactive bought out Dark Horse's share of DHI and renamed it Cryo Studios, relocating its offices to the Central Eastside Industrial District of Portland. Cryo Studios existed entirely as Cryo Interactive's American subsidiary, producing games based on licensed properties.

Their first license (as DHI) was based on MTV's animated science fiction series Aeon Flux. However, the license agreement was terminated before development was completed and the game was re-adapted into its own fictional universe as Pax Corpus. Shortly afterwards, DHI was granted the license to develop an interactive game based on Dark Horse's own comic book series, Hellboy, written and drawn by Mike Mignola. The Windows version of Hellboy: Dogs of the Night was completed in 2000 after nearly four years of production; the intended PlayStation version of this game was put on ice. Their next project was to be based on Universal Classic Monsters, which included Dracula, Frankenstein, and The Wolf Man. However, before any project made it out of pre-production, Cryo Interactive – quickly succumbing to the worldwide recession of 2001 – closed its North American branch. Cryo Interactive filed for bankruptcy a year later. In 2003, Canada-based Dreamcatcher Interactive – a former subsidiary of Cryo Interactive – finished development on and released the PlayStation version now retitled to Hellboy: Asylum Seeker in time for the theatrical release of the Hellboy movie, though the two are unrelated.

=== Demise and aftermath ===
Recent Cryo logo

By July 2002, not long after Frank Herbert's Dune flopped, the value of Cryo shares had plummeted and the financial situation of the company, which had closed its North American branch Cryo Studios the year before, was no longer sustainable. Cryo failed to negotiate a deal with its creditors, consequently filing for insolvency and making over 80 percent of its workforce redundant. Subsidiary Cryo Networks ceased operations shortly thereafter, leaving its then-ongoing projects DUNE Generations and Black Moon Chronicles: Wind of War unfinished. In October 2002, the parent company was put on liquidation, but subsequent negotiations ultimately caused DreamCatcher Interactive to absorb most of its assets and development teams, thus forming the base for DreamCatcher Europe.

The SCOL technology developed by Cryo Networks was released as an open source project in late 2002. Also following Cryo's bankruptcy, its partnership with Italian developer Trecision fell through and Trecision managed to acquire publishing rights to its co-developed games Popeye: Hush Rush for Spinach and the Windows and PlayStation 2 versions of Zidane Football Generation. However, the former was cancelled and the latter was stripped of its Zinedine Zidane license and released as Calcio 2003 in Italy and Football Generation in the rest of Europe, the PlayStation 2 version not being released until 2006, three years after Trecision itself had filed for voluntary liquidation.

Between 2003 and 2006, DreamCatcher division The Adventure Company released Salammbo: Battle for Carthage, in development at Cryo Interactive at the time it went bankrupt and completed posthumously, as well as new sequels in the Cryo trademark series of Atlantis and Egypt 1156 B.C.. DreamCatcher also completed the PlayStation version of Hellboy: Dogs of the Night, originally developed for Windows by Cryo Studios, and released it as Hellboy: Asylum Seeker in 2004, to coincide with the release of the first feature film of the franchise.

DreamCatcher was acquired by Austrian publisher JoWooD Productions in November 2006. By March 2007, the company downsized DreamCatcher Europe to a publishing brand only and laid off its remaining development staff, effectively ending the Cryo legacy.

On 20 October 2008 Microïds acquired the brands and intellectual property of Cryo Interactive. Microïds also stated that it intended to distribute Cryo's older games digitally, and that it was developing new games based on Cryo's intellectual properties. Since the acquisition of Microïds by Anuman Interactive in November 2009, one game from the Cryo franchises that Anuman has planned for release is a sequel to Egypt III. As of December 2013, GOG.com had seven Cryo-developed games made available under its digital distribution service, namely Dragon Lore and the MegaRace and Atlantis series.

== Critical reception ==
One day in the near future, the word "cryo" might become a common term amongst computer gaming types, in memory of the work by the eponymous developers. If so, I tend to think that people won't be saying, "Geez, that was awesome, talk about cryo!". Rather, they'll be saying, "What a pile of cryo! Who could be bothered with this?"

— PC Powerplay

In July 2000, Francis Rozange of the French newspaper Libération wrote, "[A] few years ago, at the time of Versailles and Atlantis, [the Cryo name] was a guarantee of quality." However, he argued that the company's name had since become a "pejorative thing, vaguely synonymous with beautiful scenery (when one is lucky) and games that bore to death." Der Spiegel reported in 2001 that Cryo originally had a reputation for "colorful, graphically opulent and content-wise light adventure games". Discussing Cryo's pivot to online games in the early 2000s, writer Martin Schnelle remarked, "With the decline of this [adventure] genre in general and also due to the low quality of its own products in particular compared to many competitors, the designers were forced to look for alternatives."

John Walker, who reviewed most of Cryo's games for PC Gamer and gave them all negative reviews, described the studio's work as "always-awful but ever-so-sincere", adding that the studio "defied sense, taste, and coherence to produce an endless stream of the worst, most clumsy, most drearily pre-rendered Myst clones the world has ever seen". Furthermore, Walker said that Cryo's output consisted of "Deadpan adventure games set in wholly ludicrous reinterpretations of out-of-copyright works of literature, in which nothing made sense, and all puzzles were unfathomable guesswork".

== See also ==
- List of Cryo Interactive video games
