= Safecracker (video game) =

1997 video game

- Cover for GT Interactive version
- Developer: Daydream Software
- Publishers: Warner Interactive Entertainment; GT Interactive; Dreamcatcher Interactive (reissue)
- Platforms: Classic Mac OS, Windows
- Release: May 1997
- Genre: Puzzle adventure

Safecracker is a 1997 puzzle adventure game developed by Daydream Software and published by GT Interactive. It casts the player as a security professional, whose goal is to infiltrate the mansion headquarters of a safe manufacturer and break into 35 of its unusual models. Each safe is guarded by a different type of puzzle, including sliding tiles, anagram codes and translations from braille. The player's progression is nonlinear: the mansion can be explored, and its safes unlocked, in multiple orders. However, the game must be completed within a 12-hour time limit.

Safecracker was conceived in 1994 as the debut title by Daydream, one of Sweden's first major computer game developers. After signing with Warner Interactive Entertainment (WIE) in 1995, Daydream began to develop the game with Macromedia Director and QuickTime VR. Expensive Silicon Graphics machines were purchased with Warner's funding to create the visuals; musicians Rob 'n' Raz were hired to compose the soundtrack. However, corporate upheaval at WIE led to costly delays. GT Interactive ultimately bought the publisher in 1996 and purposely slow-walked Safecracker's release and promotion. Having anticipated problems with GT, Daydream went public: its hit IPO drew enough capital for the team to repurchase Safecracker's rights in 1997 and sign new distributors worldwide.

While Safecracker's troubled release hurt its retail performance, long-tail sales at a budget price eventually carried it to 650,000 units sold. Reviewers broadly panned the game's limited core premise, although certain writers considered it a strength and recommended the title to fans of puzzle games. Critical reception of the puzzles and visuals ranged from positive to strongly negative. Following the launch of Safecracker, Daydream became a foundational company in the Swedish game industry. Nevertheless, problems caused by its early public launch led to the developer's bankruptcy in 2003. Kheops Studio and The Adventure Company later released a spiritual successor to Safecracker under the name Safecracker: The Ultimate Puzzle Adventure (2006).

== Gameplay and plot ==
The player stands near a safe. The heads-up display (HUD) interface surrounds the play window; the inventory appears at the bottom.

Safecracker is a puzzle adventure game that takes place from a first-person view in a pre-rendered visual environment. The player uses a point-and-click interface to traverse the game world and interact with objects. In a manner that has been compared to Zork Nemesis, the player's movement is restricted to jumps between panoramic static screens. The camera view can rotate 360° on each screen. In Safecracker, the player assumes the role of a professional in the security systems business, who seeks a job with the fictional Crabb & Sons Company. The firm is a manufacturer of safes with unusual designs. As an audition, the player character is contracted by Crabb & Sons' owner to infiltrate his mansion headquarters and crack the safes within, with the ultimate goal of breaking into the new "F-9-12" design.

The game begins outside Crabb & Sons' building, after which the player sneaks in and begins to explore. Safecracker features nonlinear progression: the mansion's rooms can be navigated, and their safes tackled, in multiple orders. However, the game must be beaten under a 12-hour time limit. The mansion contains over 50 rooms and 35 safes, which are guarded by puzzles in a range of styles. Among these are mathematics puzzles, anagram codes, conversions of temperature units, translations from braille, musical problems and sliding puzzles. Unlocking a safe provides the player with clues and keys, which open up new areas and allow other puzzles to be solved. At the same time, certain clues are hidden around the mansion in books and other objects that the player may investigate. Clue items are stored in the inventory on the heads-up display (HUD) interface, which also features a meter that tracks the number of puzzles solved.

== Development ==
=== Origins ===
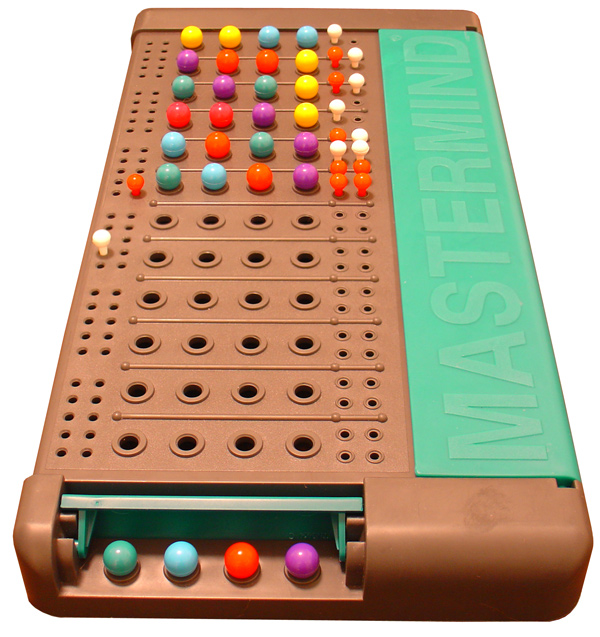
The board game Mastermind was an early influence on Safecracker.

Safecracker was conceived in 1994 by acquaintances Jörgen Isaksson and Nigel Papworth of Umeå, Sweden. Papworth's interest in making games was first sparked when Isaksson showed him Myst: its simple HyperCard engine suggested to Papworth that game programming could be easy. Isaksson himself had previously experimented with the medium to entertain his younger sister, yielding a computer conversion of the board game Mastermind. Papworth seized on this idea and reworked Isaksson's Mastermind board into a safe puzzle. After a short time, the pair had devised five more safes in this style, and the thought arose for an entire game about cracking safes in a single building. This concepting stage began in summer 1994. Isaksson and Papworth soon pitched the Safecracker idea to Erik Phersson and Jan Phersson-Broburg, the heads of a local computer services company, Sombrero, that Isaksson had co-founded. The more recent hire Leif Holm was present as well.

At a meeting in fall 1994, roughly one month after Isaksson had shown Myst to Papworth, the five men resolved to create Safecracker together. The Phersson brothers had already been anxious to expand into new fields. Phersson-Broburg immediately arranged an interview with Sanji Tandan, the head of Warner Music Sweden, based on the logic that the publisher had a worldwide foothold in the CD business. The first contact with Warner occurred in October 1994. However, the Safecracker team initially lacked any materials to sell Tandan on the game. Papworth, a professional illustrator, wrote that he hurriedly "made 2 pretty crude visuals with colored felt tips on an A1 sketch pad that showed a start sequence and some examples of different safe puzzles". Phersson-Broburg composed a financial roadmap for the project, while Isaksson cooperated with Papworth to construct the game's plot. The team used StrataVision 3D to create a test of Safecracker's pre-rendered graphics. Tandan enjoyed their presentation and the meeting was a success. Based on this event, the five team members founded Daydream Software in November 1994.

Nevertheless, Daydream's handshake deal with the publisher fell through. Tandan reported back that the rest of Warner Music Sweden was uninterested in pursuing computer games. Shortly thereafter, the Safecracker plan was revived during the 1994 Christmas party at Daydream's new office space. The team was called by the London-based Warner Interactive Entertainment, whose executive Laurence Scotford expressed interest in the game and soon flew to Umeå to learn more. The team then traveled to the publisher's London headquarters and pitched Safecracker directly. A writer for the city of Umeå later remarked that it was "a tricky display with cumbersome computers", but the parties reached a tentative agreement to partner on the game. Afterward, the contract was carefully tweaked at Daydream's offices. The developer signed with Warner to develop Safecracker in March 1995, as part of a three-year, multi-title deal set to run until March 1998. Funding was provided via an advance against royalties of 2.5 million kr; Daydream was set to earn 50 kr per unit sold, while Warner retained all revenues for the first 50,000 sales of the game. In retrospect, Papworth felt that Daydream was "lucky" to have joined the game industry when it did, as many of "the big record companies" were entering the computer game business with low standards as to the content they financed.

=== Production ===
Daydream Software began development of Safecracker by creating thorough blueprints of the mansion and its rooms on paper. Objects inside the building were similarly drawn on paper ahead of the modeling stage. Nigel Papworth wrote that he "raided the local bookshops and bought up all the books [he] could find on antique furniture and Victoriana" for inspiration. The plan was to build the game's visual assets on Macintosh computers with Strata StudioPro after the concepting phase. However, Daydream soon deduced that the agreed-upon budget and deadline for Safecracker were unworkable with the developer's existing personnel and technology, according to Papworth. Hoping to speed up production, Jörgen Isaksson suggested that the team develop Safecracker's graphics on expensive Silicon Graphics workstations instead. Daydream felt that these machines and their software "offered an unbeatable combination of speed, quality in modeling and rendering". The company persuaded Warner Interactive Entertainment to pay $50,000 for three workstations and a server, which made Daydream one of Sweden's top three buyers of Silicon Graphics computers. As a result, the graphics-production setup for Safecracker consisted of SGI Indy machines, for modeling the visuals, and a single SGI Challenge server. All of them were used for rendering.

For Safecracker's design, the team adopted a nonlinear approach because they were "allergic" to linear gameplay, Papworth later said. While researching adventure games in preparation, Papworth catalogued his dislikes with the genre and shaped Safecracker accordingly. This resulted in a scheme to make the basement and first floor fully traversable from the start, and the second floor unlockable after a relatively short time. In this way, Papworth noted, "Only the end task would be dependent on most of the clues having been already solved", which prevented Safecracker from becoming a series of roadblocks. Nonlinearity proved to be a challenge for both the designers and programmers. In an attempt to prevent the open structure from confusing players, the team included "exact instructions and advice" in the starting sequence, Papworth explained. Papworth used each room's theme to determine the design of its puzzles: for example, the music room contains a jukebox-inspired safe. He recalled creating roughly "80% of the safe designs in the first 3–4 weeks" of production; the rest were handled by other team members at later times.

Daydream Software created rotatable 360° panoramas (like the one demonstrated above) by stitching together 12 still images of each room in QuickTime VR.

Safecracker was developed primarily on Macintosh hardware with Macromedia Director and QuickTime VR. The latter software, which displays virtual-reality panoramas, had not yet been used for many games. It was one of the selling points in the Warner Interactive deal: Papworth remarked that the team hoped to "be the first developer to use [3D rotating panoramas] in a full sized game." Daydream worked initially with a beta edition, as QuickTime VR was not launched until July 1995. To create Safecracker's visuals, Daydream used its Silicon Graphics computers to build wire-frame 3D models with programs from Alias Wavefront, including PowerAnimator. Each modeler consulted a collective to-do list, from which he would "pick an object ... and write his name beside it", according to Papworth. This list cited the relevant reference pages in Papworth's books. Texture maps were drawn on Macintosh computers with Adobe Photoshop and Illustrator. Once a textured environment was lit, the team inserted a camera to render 12 images in a 360° radius, and the results were image-stitched into a rotatable panorama with QuickTime VR.

During production, Daydream legally had zero employees, and instead hired Sombrero staff and outside freelancers on a contractual basis. Team members assumed multiple roles. Leif Holm and the new hire Fredrik Jonsson modeled environments and furniture; Holm simultaneously managed aspects of Unix programming. Papworth, alongside his other jobs, textured environments and arranged objects inside them. Isaksson modeled and coded, but also compiled the team's visual assets into QuickTime VR and Macromedia Director, in which they were made playable and interactive. Sound effects, handled with Digital Audio Tapes and Macromedia's SoundEdit, were overseen by Erik Phersson. Papworth recalled that Daydream "purchased about 100 sound effect CDs" to assist him. Hoping to increase the soundtrack's quality by hiring professionals, Daydream contracted Swedish artists Rob 'n' Raz to create a unique musical theme for every room in Safecracker. This deal caused issues with STIM and the Nordisk Copyright Bureau regarding Rob 'n' Raz's rates, as there were no guidelines for computer software scores. Near the end of development, Daydream similarly contracted the firm Datadesign & Multimedia AB for coding assistance.

=== Delays and public offering ===
As Safecracker's production progressed, instability at Warner Interactive Entertainment became a major concern for Daydream Software. These issues resulted in costly delays. The team finished "a basic build of Safecracker in less than a year", according to Nigel Papworth, and the game was nearing completion by the first part of 1996. However, around that time, Warner informed Daydream that it wanted the game localized in eight languages, even though the original contract had only accounted for English. This pushed the completion date back four months: the game's pre-rendered visuals contained writing in English and had to be deconstructed and re-rendered in other languages. Laurence Scotford was moved off Safecracker thanks to corporate restructuring; meanwhile, Warner Interactive Entertainment's sister branch Time Warner Interactive was sold to WMS Gaming in April 1996. Warner demonstrated Safecracker's progress at the spring European Computer Trade Show (ECTS) that month, by which time it was on track for July. Inscape, a Warner affiliate that served as the game's North American distributor, subsequently showed Safecracker at the 1996 Electronic Entertainment Expo (E3).

In July 1996, Time Warner signaled plans to exit the game industry entirely, after its moves earlier in the year. Daydream learned that Warner Interactive Entertainment was being sold to GT Interactive around the time that the localizations for Safecracker were almost finished. By September 1996, talks of the buyout effort had become public at the fall ECTS. A writer for the city of Umeå noted that Daydream had "an uneasy feeling" about the deal, partly because GT Interactive was known for shooter games antithetical to Safecracker's nonviolent ethos. In addition, Papworth recalled his negative impression of a leading GT executive, whom he later dubbed "the most arrogant and unpleasant individual whom we had stumbled across in [the] industry". Before Warner's sale was completed, Daydream began to explore alternative business strategies to offer the team greater flexibility. The developer sought to increase its economic and decision-making independence compared to traditional publishing arrangements, and, for future projects, to select publishers nearer to the end of development. In particular, Jan Phersson-Broberg wrote that Daydream wanted to secure partners that were "strong at the time of launch."

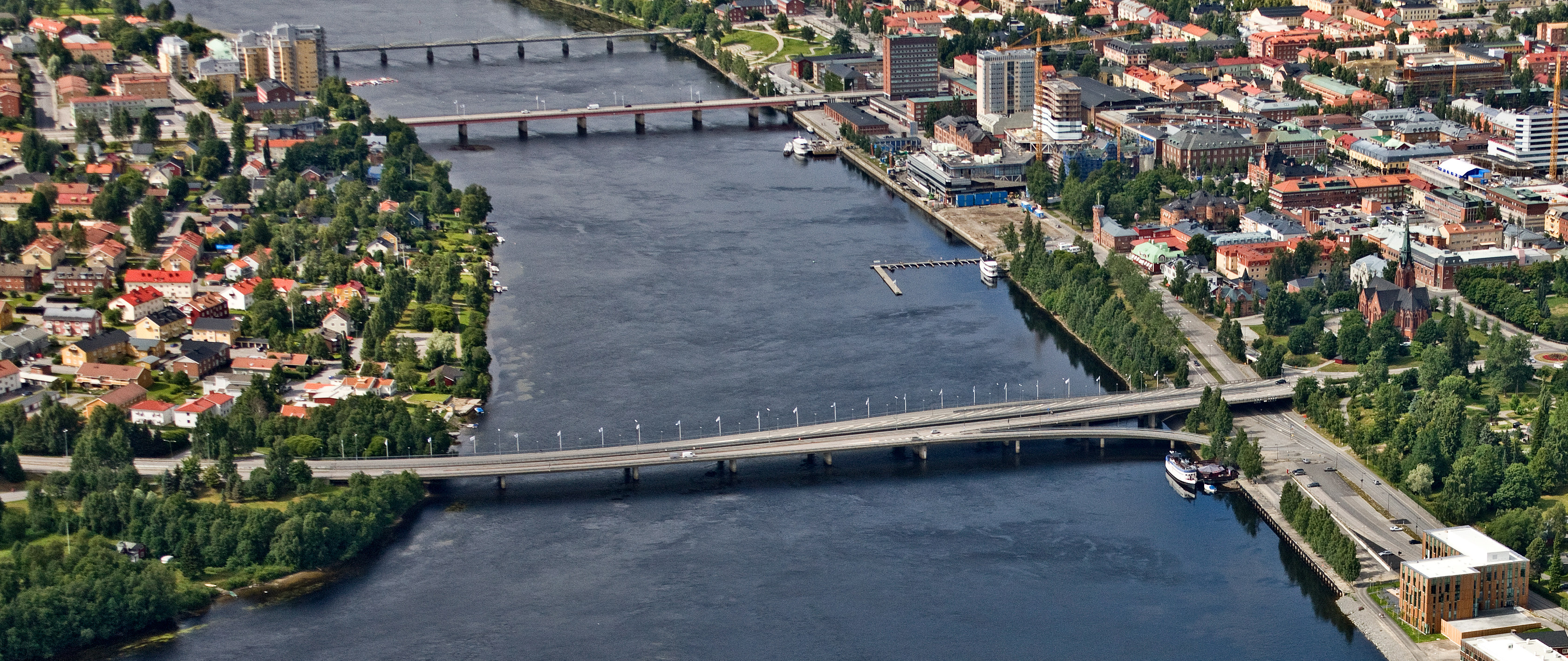
Daydream Software was among Sweden's earliest major computer game companies, and was the only game developer in Umeå (pictured) by 1996.

Daydream struggled to find investors in Sweden. The country's game industry was small: Daydream itself was "one of Sweden's first international developers", according to a writer for the city of Umeå. It was the only development house in the city. Attempts to obtain money from banks were unsuccessful, as they were indifferent to Safecracker and did not see computer games as valuable in comparison to staple industries like lumber. Phersson-Broberg noted that Swedish venture capitalists were similarly uninterested in his business, thanks to the long-term returns on investment that Daydream promised. This problem ultimately led Daydream to attempt an initial public offering (IPO), after the brokerage firm Matteus Corporate Finance approached the developer and assessed its worth as 40 million kr. Phersson-Broberg called the plan dangerous and "probably the last thing you choose as a young company". However, he argued that self-financing Daydream's future games with money from Swedish shareholders would provide more stability, adaptability and room for growth.

In November 1996, Daydream bought Sombrero to incorporate the team into a single business. GT Interactive announced its purchase of Warner Interactive Entertainment on November 25, and Daydream released its IPO prospectus to potential investors on the 26th. According to the plan, the company was not expected to reach profitability for more than three years. Safecracker had been in development for roughly one-and-a-half years by that time, and was set to launch around the turn of 1997. Papworth's work on the game concluded in November, and he started to explore possibilities for Daydream's next title. A large amount of media attention began to surround Daydream's IPO. The team hosted regular meetings with Swedish and international investors at Stockholm's Sturehof restaurant, where they demonstrated Safecracker on large displays. In early December 1996, during the run-up to the public offering, Safecracker won the "Best Entertainment Title" and "Overall People's Choice" prizes at the Macromedia European Users Conference. Later that month, Daydream sold 2.6 million shares—roughly 45.5% of the company—to Matteus Corporate Finance at 7.65 kr each. This raised 20 million kr. Matteus's role as the subscriber was to sell these shares to the wider public, with a starting price of 8.35 kr per share.

Daydream opened on the Stockholm Stock Exchange's Stockholm Börsinformation (SBI) list on January 16, 1997. Its launch was an immediate hit: the company's share price ended the first day at 29 kr. Stocks quickly rose to 48 kr, and ultimately stabilized around 58 kr. Buyers included Berth Milton and Björn Nordstrand. The Wall Street Journal reported that Daydream became "the darling of the country's stock market"; its IPO achieved a 25-time oversubscription, Matteus's biggest success by that date. Soon after the launch, Pål Leveraas of Norway's Digi.no wrote, "With nothing but a new, self-developed computer game in the portfolio, the five [founders] have already become multi-millionaires." A writer for the city of Umeå similarly noted that "Daydream didn't even have a game on the market, let alone any revenue." Meanwhile, Safecracker began to encounter problems with GT Interactive. Daydream told investors that the new publisher was set to honor Warner's agreements on the project, and that the team viewed the situation as "very positive". However, GT Interactive delayed Safecracker past its due date of January 1997 to redesign its physical packaging—initially to late March and finally to May.

== Release and distribution ==
Safecracker was first released in Sweden in the middle of May 1997. Later that month and in early June, it received follow-up launches in 14 other territories across Europe and South America. Despite significant pre-release coverage, Safecracker's many delays meant that the "momentum for the game ... could not be exploited", according to the academic researchers Ola Henfridsson, Helena Holmström and Ole Hanseth. It accrued sales of 18,000 units in its first two weeks. Jan Phersson-Broberg later told investors that GT Interactive failed to support Safecracker at retail. He reported that the publisher "did not advertise, [and] did not place interviews, reviews" or other press relations material for the game, and that he received silence when Daydream Software sought an explanation. Behind the scenes, according to The Wall Street Journal, the project had "ended up on the 'let-die' pile" at GT Interactive.

Global sales of Safecracker reached 22,000 units by the start of autumn, before its launch in the Australian and North American markets. It remained unreleased in the latter region by late 1997. Nigel Papworth noted that North America was "seen as the paramount market to crack" for international developers; its buying power was equivalent to the rest of the world's combined. Reacting to these delays, Daydream publicly reported trouble with GT Interactive Europe in late 1997, and questioned the publisher's competence with and interest in Safecracker. Next Generation quoted the team's statement that it was "increasingly frustrated over the lack of marketing and the stalling of a North American release". In September 1997, Daydream initiated a plan to repurchase all rights to Safecracker, a move enabled by the developer's independent financing from shareholders. The buyout was executed on November 27. It cost roughly 1.4 million kr, compared to the 2.2 million kr that Daydream owed its publisher for the Warner Interactive advance. The money spent to purchase Safecracker counted toward repayment of the advance, which had been set to bankrupt Daydream.

In place of the GT Interactive contract, Daydream hired the talent agency Octagon Entertainment, a firm also involved with Fable and Starship Titanic. Octagon's job was to sign local distribution partners in Asia, Europe, Australia and North America for Safecracker. Phersson-Broberg told investors that partnering with regional companies, each of which understood its respective market, enabled the developer to "spread [its] eggs in more baskets". This strategy was intended to raise Safecracker's chances of becoming a hit. Daydream offloaded marketing and unit production to each distributor, which Phersson-Broberg said would allow the company to "focus solely on developing more good computer games." The developer forecast that the repayment of its advance, combined with its full ownership of the game, would hasten Safecracker's breaking even. As part of the buyback deal with GT Interactive, Daydream recalled around 7,500 unsold copies of the game's original release to storage. The developer proceeded to resell these to new distributors at prices ranging from 80 to 180 kr. Safecracker's Macintosh version launched in Sweden in December 1997.

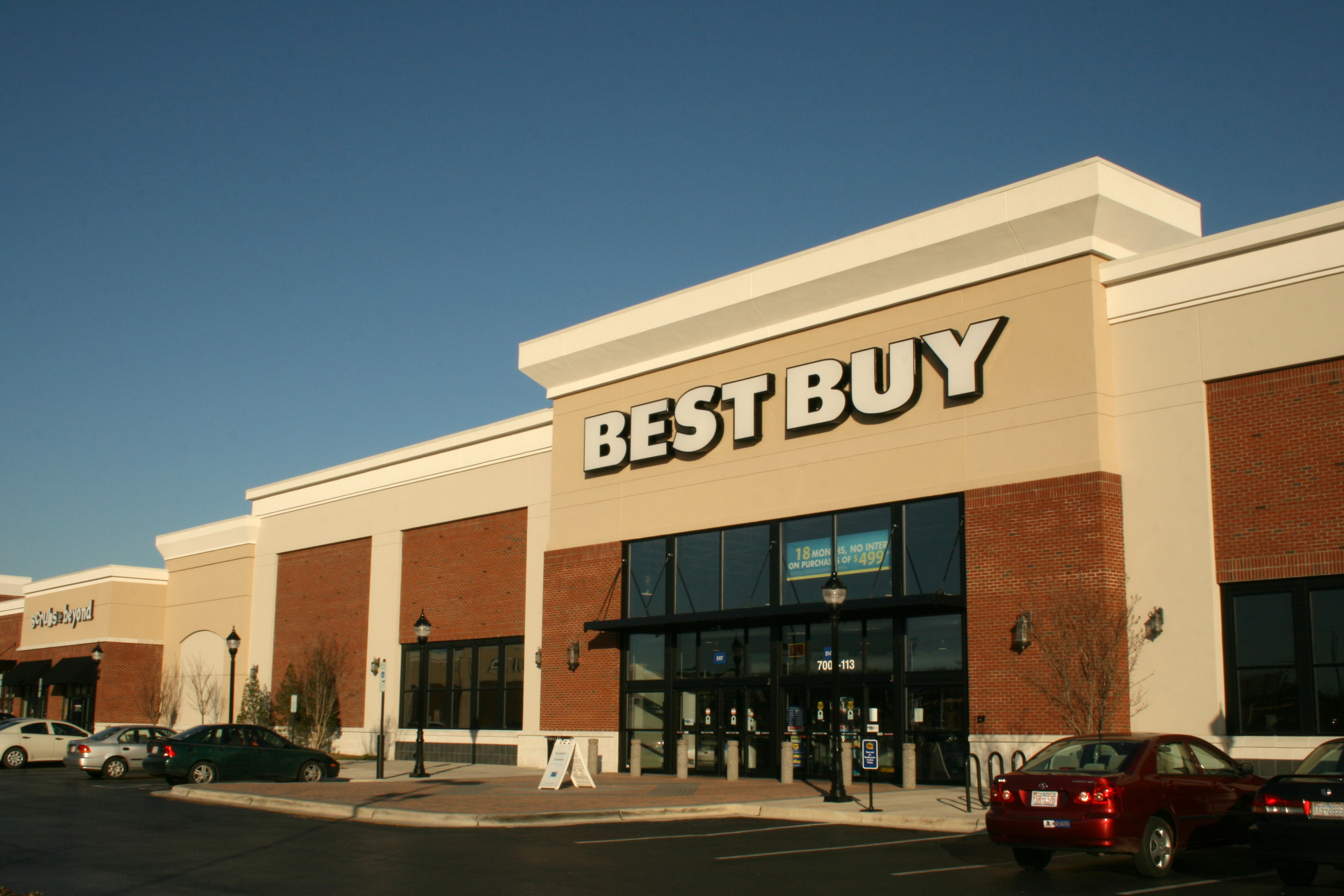
DreamCatcher Interactive brought Safecracker to large North American retailers such as Best Buy.

By March 1998, Safecracker's display at the Milia festival in Cannes had secured it new distribution agreements in nine countries, including Germany, France, Australia and—with publisher PXL Computers—Canada and the United States. Daydream signed with Ahead Multimedia in June 1998 to re-release the game in Sweden, attracted by the publisher's penetration of unusual storefronts such as post offices and gas stations. In markets where GT Interactive had previously launched Safecracker, the game was sold at a lower price. Phersson-Broberg promised investors greater earnings from North America, as it was a new market for the game. Safecracker had reappeared in certain countries by the end of May 1998; revenue on each unit ranged between 30 and 130 kr at the time. Despite PXL Computers' release of the game, Papworth reported in 1999 that Safecracker had underperformed in North America. He felt that its tumultuous history had prevented it from receiving "the crack it deserve[d] at the American Market".

Safecracker's global sales totaled 65,000 units by January 1999, for revenues of 3.2 million kr. This performance amounted to a lifetime loss of 500,000 kr. Sales had risen to roughly 70,000 units the following month, at which point the game's development costs were fully capitalized. Although Safecracker had become a budget game by that time, Daydream told investors that its revenues remained "at the same level as when the product was launched and sold as a full-cost product." Conversely, the company reported later in 1999 the game's lower price point had decreased its earnings. Safecracker sold roughly 200,000 units by May 30 and 235,000 by September 30. By April 2000, European and Asian markets alone had accounted for 250,000 sales.

In spring 2000, Safecracker received a second launch in North America through DreamCatcher Interactive, the distributor for Daydream's Traitors Gate in the region. This deal offered Safecracker access to mainstream retailers such as Best Buy, Babbage's and CompUSA, at around 1,600 locations throughout the territory. It became successful for DreamCatcher. The game's worldwide sales reached approximately 275,000 copies by the end of May 2000 and 300,000 copies by mid-2001. In the 2010s, a writer for the city of Umeå retrospectively judged Safecracker a success. The author remarked that the game ultimately "sold 650,000 copies, not least via the department store chain Walmart", where it was stocked as a budget title.

== Reception ==
Reception

Review scores
Publication	Score
Adventure Gamers	4/5
IGN	5.2/10
PC Gamer (US)	75%
PC PowerPlay	49%
PC Zone	40%
PC Games	D
Just Adventure	B+

In October 1997, Safecracker won the "People's Choice" prize among entertainment products at the Macromedia International User Conference (UCON). This followed the game's wins, before its launch, at the Macromedia European User Awards.

Reviewing the game's PXL Computers edition, Joseph Novicki of PC Gamer US and Joel Strauch of PC Games offered conflicting opinions. Novicki praised the "clarity of purpose" in Safecracker's narrow focus on puzzle-solving, compared to Myst-inspired titles that combine puzzles with plot. By contrast, Strauch considered the game's limited story and premise to be major flaws. The lack of interaction beyond safecracking was likewise cited as a positive and a negative, respectively, by the two writers. While Novicki summarized Safecracker as "good puzzle game for gamers of all skill levels", despite problems with its inventory system, Strauch called the puzzles a mixed bag and ultimately panned the game.

The reviewer for PC PowerPlay, David Wildgoose, continued Strauch's complaints about the "stifling and pointless basic premise" in Safecracker. Charlie Brooker of PC Zone concurred: he dismissed the title as a dull, limited experience, and "the sort of thing that [only] impresses computer game virgins and Macintosh owners". He also echoed Strauch's criticism of the QuickTime VR implementation, which both writers found unimpressive as a computer game engine. Brooker's only praise went to the soundtrack, which he considered "alright". Wildgoose joined Brooker in calling Safecracker's visuals technically impressive but nevertheless drab and boring, and took a harder line than Strauch against the "witless, haphazard" puzzles. Writing for IGN, Scott Steinberg was more positive on the puzzles, of which he noted that "a rather large quantity ... are nothing short of ingenious". He also offered light praise to the visuals, in contrast to Brooker and Wildgoose. Despite these concessions, Steinberg ultimately declared Safecracker prohibitively difficult and confusing, and he sharply criticized its "techno crud" score.

The adventure game websites Just Adventure and Adventure Gamers were more approving of Safecracker. Ray Ivey of the latter publication called the puzzle design "simply a delight", and felt that the game was addictive. Just Adventure's Randy Sluganski similarly lauded the puzzles. Although he found them extremely difficult, he wrote that "you actually feel a sense of accomplishment and pride" after solving them. Sluganski also enjoyed the "top-notch" visuals. While he and Ivey both declared Safecracker's plot an afterthought, neither writer felt that its simplicity detracted from the game. Both compared the proceedings to Jewels of the Oracle, which Sluganski believed would limit its appeal, but he nonetheless strongly recommended Safecracker to puzzle devotees. Ivey offered a more general recommendation: to him, Safecracker was a "breezy good time, not to be missed."

== Legacy ==
With Safecracker as its first release, Daydream Software became an important force in Swedish games. A writer for the city of Umeå later remarked that Daydream "laid the foundation for the lucrative gaming industry in northern Sweden", which later included Coldwood Interactive and Nifflas Games in Umeå itself. The team followed Safecracker with Traitors Gate (1999) and the online game Clusterball (2000). However, Daydream was hounded by problems related to its public launch. The Umeån writer noted that shareholders did not understand the game industry or "the time it takes to develop a large, extensive computer game", and that they demanded faster returns than the prospectus had promised. The Wall Street Journal reported that stocks had crashed at Daydream by early 1998. In retrospect, Nigel Papworth called the company's hit IPO "bad for us [in the end]. Here we were, blue-eyed, no proper management, no board." Jan Phersson-Broberg likewise believed that the IPO was premature. After a series of financial and management problems related to its public status, the developer was shuttered in 2003.

In April 2006, plans for another Safecracker installment were revealed by publisher DreamCatcher Interactive. It was developed by Kheops Studio, previously known for Return to Mysterious Island. At the time of the announcement, Adventure Gamers reported that the game was to be a spiritual sequel rather than a direct follow-up, and that it would feature 35 safe puzzles. According to Kheops' Benoît Hozjan, DreamCatcher first contacted his team about developing a new Safecracker in early 2006, thanks to the original's status as a hit for the publisher. Kheops responded with a pitch for the game and suggested a story based on locating a will. Hozjan noted that the team had difficulty with the title's "fully puzzle-oriented" design, as its earlier projects had emphasized plot. The resultant game, entitled Safecracker: The Ultimate Puzzle Adventure, follows a safecracking professional who seeks the lost will of Duncan W. Adams, a wealthy collector of safes with unusual designs. After going gold in July 2006, the title reached store shelves in August. A port for the Wii was released in December 2008.
