= Cleopatra: Riddle of the Tomb =

2007 adventure video game

- Developer: Kheops Studio
- Publishers: FRA: Nobilis France; NA: The Adventure Company (Note: Mac OS X and iOS ports developed and published by Coladia.)
- Platforms: Windows, Mac OS X, iOS
- Release: Windows: FRA: June 27, 2007; NA: April 3, 2008; Mac OS X May 14, 2009 iOS; April 13, 2011
- Genre: Adventure
- Mode: Single-player

Cleopatra: Riddle of the Tomb is a 2007 adventure video game by French developer Kheops Studio. Outside of the United States, it is known as Cleopatra: A Queen's Destiny.

== Plot ==
Taking place in 48 BC, the plot of the game centers on Cleopatra's struggle toward the Egyptian throne, and her subsequent civil war with her brother Ptolemy.

The protagonist of the game is Thomas of Chaldea, a young student of astrology, whose mentor Akkad and the latter's daughter Iris (who is romantically involved with Thomas) are arrested under Ptolemy's orders after Cleopatra commissions Akkad to perform an astrological divination regarding her prospective alliance with Julius Caesar. Working together with Cleopatra, Thomas explores Alexandria, solving puzzles, reading documents and meeting a few colorful characters along the way. He tracks Akkad and Iris to the plague-ridden isle of Pharos, but learns that his mentor was killed by Grecian mercenaries hired by Ptolemy after refusing to falsify his divination for Cleopatra so that she would abdicated the throne in favor of her brother. Thomas saves Iris from the lighthouse, and she agrees to perform the divination in her father's stead, using his secret, technologically advanced observatory. The divination foretells that Caesar will be a great ally to Cleopatra, and that their son would inherit both Egypt and Rome. Satisfied with the prediction, Cleopatra thanks Thomas and Iris for their help. The two then leave for Chaldea, intending to live the rest of their lives in peace.

== Gameplay ==
Like other adventure games of the time, Cleopatra has a Myst-like series of panoramic screens that the player can navigate through, allowing them to click on hotspots to: advance to new locations, acquire inventory, complete puzzles, or interact with characters. The game uses "dynamic combinatorial inventory", which allows players to disassemble certain items in their inventory; using only a piece of one to combine with other items.

== Critical reception ==
Reception

Aggregate score
Aggregator	Score
Metacritic	67/100

Review scores
Publication	Score
Adventure Gamers	3/5
Gamekult	5/10
GameSpot	7/10
GameStar	70%
Gamezebo	70/100
GameZone	7.5/10
IGN	7.7/10
Jeuxvideo.com	14/20
PC Gamer (US)	68%

The PC version received "average" reviews according to the review aggregation website Metacritic.

Frank D. Nicodem, Jr. of UHS praised the game's historical accuracy, user interface, and puzzles, adding that the game exhibits all the qualities that made Kheops Studio a leader in historical video games, alongside Return to Mysterious Island, Voyage, Secret of the Lost Cavern, and Destination: Treasure Island. IGN reviewer Emily Balistrieri thought the game would be appealing to those interested in post-Alexander Ancient Egypt, as it involved puzzles that are naturally integrated into the context.
