= Toontrack =

Swedish music software company

- Type: Private
- Industry: Music software Virtual instrument software
- Founded: 1999; 27 years ago in Umeå, Sweden
- Founder: Andreas Sundgren, Mattias Eklund
- Headquarters: Umeå, Sweden
- Area served: Worldwide
- Key people: Peter Knutsson, CEO
- Products: Superior Drummer; EZdrummer; EZmix; EZkeys; EZbass
- Number of employees: 40 (2018)
- Website: toontrack.com

Toontrack is a music software company, based in Umeå, Sweden. Founded in 1997, it develops virtual instruments and audio plug-ins, including Superior Drummer, EZdrummer, EZkeys, EZbass, and EZmix. Still headquartered in Umeå, Toontrack now has branches in the US, UK, and Germany.

== History ==
The origin of the company was initially a project for co-founders Mattias Eklund and Henke Kjellberg's own music production for video games and film, - including music for the video game soundtracks from the Umeå company Daydream Software, including Traitors Gate and Clusterball. When Eklund and Andreas Sundgren weren't able to find the kind of drum sounds that they needed, they decided to record their own with Tomas Haake, the drummer of local Swedish extreme metal band Meshuggah. They named the resulting drum sample library Drumkit From Hell, and began selling it as a product in 2000.

In 2001 Toontrack began developing Drumkit From Hell into a virtual instrument, releasing DFH Superior in 2004. From 2005, the software was further developed into two products, the simpler EZdrummer and the more fully-featured Superior Drummer. The company later expanded its product line with EZmix audio mixing software, and EZkeys, and EZbass virtual instrument software.

Toontrack also produces other expansion packs for its software, including music genre or application-specific sample packs of different instrument models, often recorded in a notable recording studio, MIDI files of riffs, often performed by notable musicians, and signal chains of notable engineers or producers.

== Products ==
=== Superior Drummer ===
The first version of Toontrack's virtual drum software was DFH Superior, which originated with the Drumkit From Hell sample library, which was developed with the help of Tomas Haake, the drummer of local Swedish extreme metal band Meshuggah. The second version, renamed Superior Drummer, established itself as one of the most popular virtual drummer programs available.

The latest version of the software is based on over 230GB of samples of acoustic drum kits and electronic drum sounds, recorded at Galaxy Studios under the supervision of Grammy award-winning engineer George Massenburg. Also included is a library of MIDI drum loops, and a mixer that allows the user to adjust the independent volumes of each of the microphones on the drum kit or add effects.

Superior Drummer is expandable with numerous SDX or EZX drum sample expansions and Drum MIDI expansions.

=== EZdrummer ===
EZdrummer, a simplified version of Superior Drummer designed specifically for songwriters, was first introduced in 2006, and, like Superior Drummer, has become one of the most popular drum VIs. The virtual drum instrument is expandable with EZX drum sample expansions and Drum MIDI expansions.

=== EZmix ===
Toontrack introduced EZmix, a plug-in for mixing and mastering, in 2010. EZmix 2, introduced in 2013, added guitar amplifier and cabinet modeling, and the latest version added AI-assisted functionality. The plug-in is expandable with EZmix Packs, many which were developed with notable recording engineers, including Chuck Ainlay and Mark Needham.

=== EZkeys ===
In 2013, the company introduced EZkeys, a virtual piano instrument. Expandable via genre- and keyboard instrument-specific EZX sample expansions and EZkey MIDI expansions, version 2 was released in 2023.

=== EZbass ===
EZbass, a virtual bass guitar instrument, was introduced in 2020. Similar to EZdrummer and EZkeys, EZbass combines a sample library of bass guitar sounds with MIDI bass grooves, and amplifier, cabinet, and effects modeling. EZbass is expandable via genre- and bass instrument-specific EBX sample expansions and Bass MIDI expansions.

== Collaborations ==
Keeping with the company's origins in collaborations with members of Meshuggah, Toontrack has collaborated with many notable musicians, producers, engineers and recording studios to create sample libraries and MIDI expansions for the company's virtual instruments.

Musicians contributing riffs for Toontrack MIDI pack expansions include John "Jabo" Starks, Clyde Stubblefield, Nir Z, Ash Soan, Chris Adler, and John Tempesta.

Producers and engineers who have contributed to Toontrack products and expansion packs include Al Schmitt, Steve Albini, Neil Dorfsman, Hugh Padgham, Eddie Kramer, Tom Dalgety, and others, capturing instruments in the ambience of recording studios including Capitol Studios, British Grove Studios, AIR Studios, Rockfield Studios, Sunset Sound, and Real World Studios.

== In use ==
Toontrack software has been used to produce a variety of albums, most notably Devin Townsend's 2007 concept album Ziltoid the Omniscient and Meshuggah's album Catch Thirtythree. It's also been used by Dethklok (for episodes of Metalocalypse season 2), and Ben Weinman of The Dillinger Escape Plan before the band hired drummer Gil Sharone.
