= Safe-cracker (disambiguation) =

A safe-cracker is a person capable of opening a safe without either the combination or the key. It may also refer to:

- Safecracker, a 1997 video game
  - Safecracker: The Ultimate Puzzle Adventure, its 2006 spiritual successor
- Safe Cracker (pinball), the Bally pinball game from 1996
- "The Safe-Cracker", a nickname of "Episode 2" (Life on Mars, series 2)
