= Safecracker: The Ultimate Puzzle Adventure =

2006 video game

Safecracker The Ultimate Puzzle Adventure
- Developer: Kheops Studio (Note: DS version developed by Firehazard Studio.)
- Publisher: The Adventure Company (Note: DS version published by DreamCatcher Interactive in North America and by Tradewest in Europe.)
- Platforms: Windows, Wii, Nintendo DS
- Release: Windows: NA: August 2, 2006; EU: October 27, 2006; AU: December 12, 2006; Wii: NA: December 3, 2008; EU: January 23, 2009; Nintendo DS: NA: December 3, 2009; EU: March 19, 2010
- Genre: Adventure
- Mode: Single-player

Safecracker: The Ultimate Puzzle Adventure is a 2006 puzzle adventure game developed by Kheops Studio and published by The Adventure Company. It is the spiritual successor to Daydream Software's 1997 title Safecracker.

Safecracker was also released on Steam on August 29, 2007. It was included in Humble Bundle's Humble Weekly Sale: The Adventure Company and Friends.

== Gameplay and plot ==
The game is a first-person puzzle adventure game, where the player moves through 3D environments, to find the safes to crack. The safes themselves vary in style and design, from safe to safe.

The games story revolves around a safe cracker, being hired by the family of a recently deceased billionaire and oil magnate, Duncan W. Adams. The player has been employed to find the will of Duncan W. Adams, by cracking the 35 safes that were in his possession.

== Development ==
Safecracker: The Ultimate Puzzle Adventure was first conceived in early 2006, when DreamCatcher Interactive queried Kheops Studio about developing a game in the style of Daydream Software's Safecracker. According to Kheops' Benoît Hozjan, the idea arose because the original had been a hit for the publisher. Kheops responded with a pitch for the game and suggested a plot based on locating a will. The puzzle-based design was a departure for the team: Hozjan wrote that Kheops had previously focused on "exploration and story" in addition to puzzles, in titles such as Return to Mysterious Island and Voyage: Inspired by Jules Verne. The transition proved difficult.

DreamCatcher's Adventure Company announced the game in April 2006. The game was reported to be a spiritual sequel to Daydream's title, rather than a strict follow-up. In May, Hozjan estimated that it would be finished in July and "released in late summer or fall" thereafter. After going gold in July 2006, the game reached store shelves in the U.S. in August.

== Reception ==
Reception

Aggregate score
Aggregator	Score		
Aggregator	DS	PC	Wii
Metacritic	43/100	69/100	56/100

Review scores
Publication	Score		
Publication	DS	PC	Wii
Adventure Gamers	N/A	4/5	N/A
Eurogamer	N/A	5/10	N/A
GameSpot	N/A	6.5/10	N/A
Gamezebo	N/A	70/100	N/A
GameZone	N/A	7/10	7/10
IGN	N/A	6.9/10	N/A
Jeuxvideo.com	13/20	12/20	N/A
NGamer	45%	N/A	28%
Nintendo Life	3/10	N/A	N/A
Nintendo World Report	N/A	N/A	6/10
Official Nintendo Magazine	32%	N/A	N/A
PC Gamer (US)	N/A	83%	N/A

The PC and Wii versions received "mixed or average reviews", while the DS version received "generally unfavorable reviews", according to the review aggregation website Metacritic.

IGN reviewer Charles Onyett thought the music, voice acting, and plot were limited, though he felt the puzzles were engaging.

The PC version won the award for "Best Puzzle Game" at the 13th Annual PC Gamer Awards.
