= Return to Mysterious Island 2 =

2009 video game

- Developer: Kheops Studio
- Publisher: MC2 France
- Platforms: Microsoft Windows; Apple iPhone; Mac OS X
- Release: 14 August 2009 (French and English)
- Genre: Adventure
- Modes: Single-player, multiplayer

Return to Mysterious Island 2: Mina's Fate is a 2009 adventure video game developed by Kheops Studio and published by MC2 France under their Microïds label. It is a sequel to the 2004 video game Return to Mysterious Island, and is again based upon the 1875 book by Jules Verne, The Mysterious Island.

== Gameplay ==
The character of Mina is back, but now her monkey, Jep, becomes the second playable character; the player will switch back and forth between the two. Each character has their own abilities—Jep, for example, can go to inaccessible places and communicate with other monkeys, whereas Mina can read documents and use complex tools.

The game could also be synchronised with the player's iPhone, allowing parts of the game, like puzzles, to be completed away from the PC, and then reintegrated again. Players are also able to communicate with other players online.

== Plot ==
During the game the player will fight for their survival on the island, and they must also save the island from an environmental disaster. Return to Mysterious Island II starts with the crash of the helicopter that attempted the rescue of Mina. She survives the crash, but is still on the island. An unknown disease suddenly begins to attack plants, then animals. Mina searches the island, and discovers an external source of pollution. It appears that the only way to save the island is to turn the shield back on, which would prevent her from returning to civilization, like Captain Nemo.

== Development ==
A sequel to Return to Mysterious Island was in development by Kheops Studio since April 2008. The game was published by Microïds and released for PC and iPhone.

The game website also displays the Cryo Interactive logo, a company which Microïds acquired in 2008, from the publisher of the original Return to Mysterious Island, The Adventure Company. The game website also encompasses Microïds other games which are based on the works of Jules Verne: The Secret of the Nautilus and Journey to the Moon.

== Reception ==
Return to Mysterious Island 2 holds a 75% rating on GameRankings.
