= Traitors Gate (video game) =

1999 video game

- North American box art
- Developer: Daydream Software
- Publishers: DreamCatcher Interactive (North America); FX Interactive (Spain); Hilad Corporation (Australia); Éditions Profil (France)
- Platforms: Macintosh, Windows
- Release: SWE: September 1999; SP: December 16, 1999; NA: May 15, 2000
- Genre: Graphic adventure
- Mode: Single-player

Traitors Gate is a 1999 graphic adventure game developed by Daydream Software. Set in a reproduction of the Tower of London, it follows the story of Raven, an American special agent trying to steal and replace the Crown Jewels of England to safeguard them from a rogue operative. The player assumes the role of Raven and solves puzzles within the Tower while evading the guards. Progression through the game is nonlinear and under a time limit: the player may solve certain challenges in multiple ways, but must win before 12 hours elapse.

Traitors Gate was conceived in 1996 by Daydream Software designer Nigel Papworth, who saw the Tower of London as a natural setting for a game. The team sought to replicate the structure with near-perfect accuracy and began by capturing over 5,000 reference photographs on location. Pre-rendering the game's panoramic environments challenged the team, which averaged seven members. The game took roughly three years to complete. Self-funded by Daydream after a successful initial public offering, Traitors Gate ultimately cost between $1 and $2 million, and by 2000 it was distributed in 10 languages and 27 countries by companies such as DreamCatcher Interactive and FX Interactive.

The game was a commercial success and became Daydream Software's highest-selling title by 2003, with sales between 300,000 and 400,000 units worldwide. Many of these sales derived from North America and Spain; it failed commercially in Germany, Italy and the United Kingdom. Critical reception of Traitors Gate was "mixed or average", according to review aggregation site Metacritic. Its puzzles and recreation of the Tower of London were lauded by many critics—the latter was praised by the British Academy of Film and Television Arts—but the title's bugs, pacing, large interface and use of mazes drew mixed reactions. In 2003, Traitors Gate was followed by the sequel Traitors Gate 2: Cypher, directed by Papworth and developed by 258 Productions.

== Gameplay and plot ==
The player infiltrates the Queen's House in the Tower of London via a secret entrance. An interface containing the player's gadgets takes up the bottom half of the screen.

Traitors Gate is a graphic adventure game that takes place from a first-person perspective in a pre-rendered visual environment. Using a point-and-click interface, the player explores a reproduction of the Tower of London and evades guards while solving puzzles, such as determining the combination to a safe by examining a coat of arms. In a manner that has been compared to Myst, player movement is restricted to jumps between panoramic static screens; the camera view can rotate freely on each screen. Traitors Gate features nonlinear progression: multiple solutions allow for roughly 1,200 unique pathways through the game. If the player does not win within the 12-hour limit, or is found by the guards, a game over results.

In Traitors Gate, the player takes the role of a special agent named Raven, employed by an American agency called ORPHIA. At the start of the game, Raven's superiors believe that another ORPHIA operative plans to steal the British Crown Jewels from the Tower of London. Raven is subsequently tasked with infiltrating the Tower, secretly swapping the real jewels with forgeries and escaping without leaving behind evidence. These forgeries are equipped with hidden tracking units. The game begins in a broom closet within the White Tower, where Raven hides during a building tour to await night. Controlling Raven, the player then exits the closet and infiltrates the Tower.

The player character is equipped with gear such as a crossbow, grappling hooks, lock picks, a motorized zip-line, explosives and tools to hijack security cameras. A PDA interface provides details about these gadgets, the Tower and other aspects of the mission. The player may also take photographs of the environment and message them to Raven's superiors, who send back facts about the objects in view. Traitors Gate features multiple endings based on the player's actions throughout the game. At the game's conclusion, after the Crown Jewels have been replaced, the President of the United States is informed that Raven's mission was a success.

== Development ==
=== Origins ===
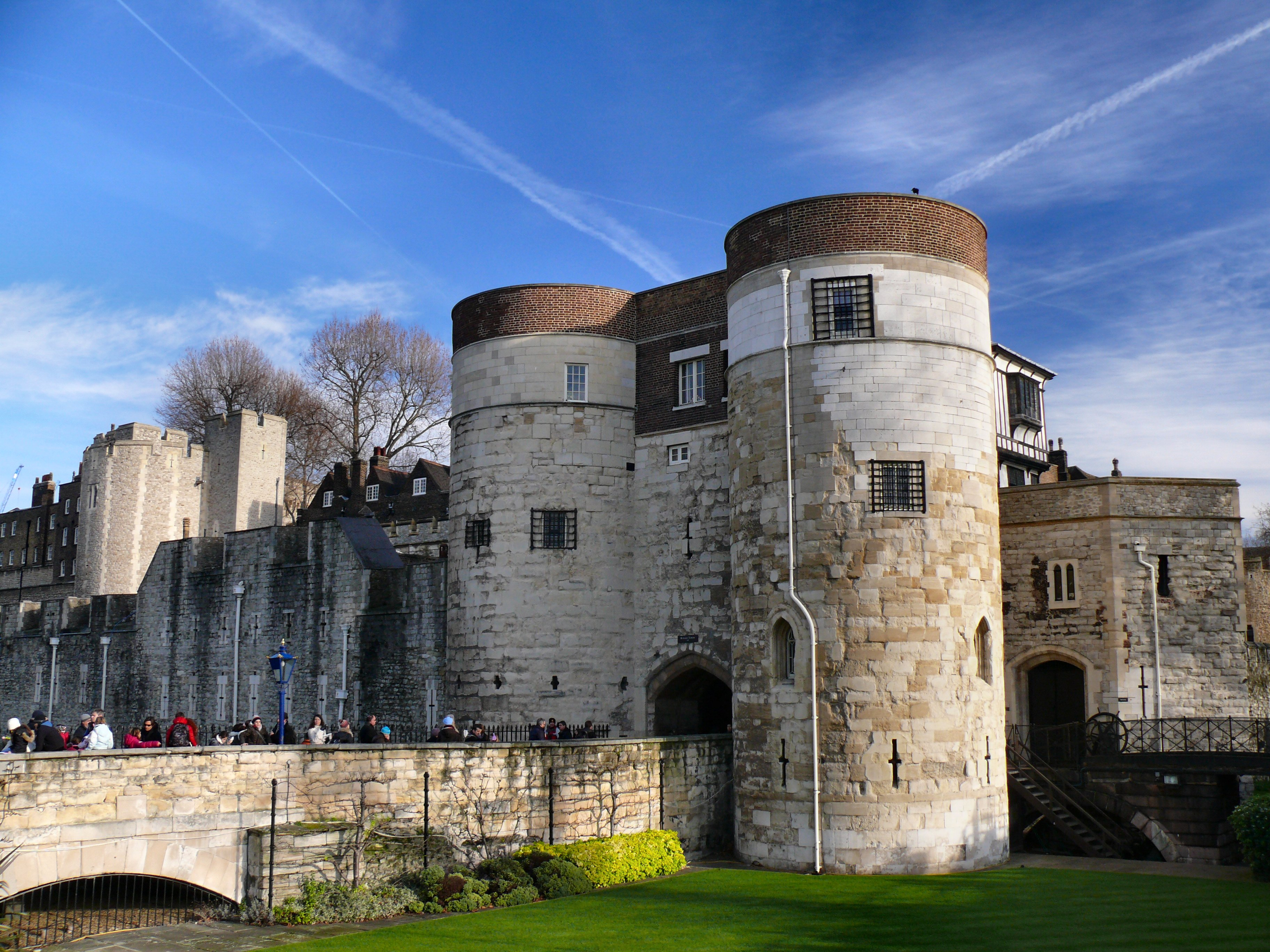
The Traitors Gate team began by capturing more than 5,000 reference photographs on-site at the Tower of London.

Traitors Gate was conceived in November 1996, when designer Nigel Papworth of Sweden's Daydream Software began to explore possibilities for the company's next title after Safecracker. Coming across an article about the Tower of London in an issue of National Geographic, Papworth realized that the structure contained "everything a good game needed", including a cleanly circumscribed playing area and an obvious gameplay objective. He and the team subsequently developed a game concept that would take place inside an accurate reproduction of the Tower. Their plan was to capture "the feel of the weathered stonework and mixed architectural styles with as near to photographic quality as time and technology would allow", and they hoped to make a game that entertained players while informing them about the real-world Tower. The decision to make the protagonist an American agent came early, as the country's alliance with Britain precluded violent gameplay approaches by the player and shifted the focus to stealth and puzzle-solving. Inspiration for the plot derived from the film series Mission: Impossible and James Bond.

Daydream went public on the Stockholm Stock Exchange's Stockholm Börsinformation (SBI) list in January 1997, with the plan for Traitors Gate prepared. The company's goal was to increase its economic and decision-making freedom, and to secure the ability to select a publisher at the end of each game's development rather than at the beginning. President Jan Phersson-Broburg argued that self-funding Daydream's future games with money from Swedish investors—instead of opting for publisher financing "linked to specific projects"—would offer the developer more stability, flexibility and room for growth. According to Papworth, Traitors Gate was part of Daydream's roadmap for the future after going public. In its November 1996 prospectus, the company had told investors that a game with the working title "Project II" was under development, with an estimated 18-month production cycle and 7-10 million kr budget. There were four competing "Project II" designs at that time. For Daydream's public launch, roughly 20 million kr worth of shares, or 45.5% of the company, were offered to investors in Sweden. The initial public offering was a success. As a result of this influx of capital, all subsequent development of Traitors Gate was self-funded.

Daydream began Traitors Gate with around one year of research, starting with a trip of eight team members to the Tower of London to photograph the entire structure over two days. More than 5,000 images were captured during this trip. According to Daydream, employee Erik Phersson organized the results within "a series of indexed ring binders", on which the artists could base their work. Papworth later noted that, because the Tower of London held the copyright to photographs taken on its grounds, digitizing the team's images for use as texture maps was not an option. Instead, they used the pictures only for photo-referencing. Before full production of the game began, Papworth plotted its narrative in storyboard form, and Daydream planned the majority of Traitors Gate's design on "a huge magnetic white board with a logic flow chart". According to lead programmer Peter Lundholm, HyperCard was used during pre-production to generate rough prototypes. In June 1997, Daydream reported that "Project II" was still in the prototyping stage and, pending a review of the finished prototype in August, would move into full production. This transition had been completed by September, and Daydream slated the result for 1998. By that time, the company had spent 1.85 million kr on the game.

=== Production ===
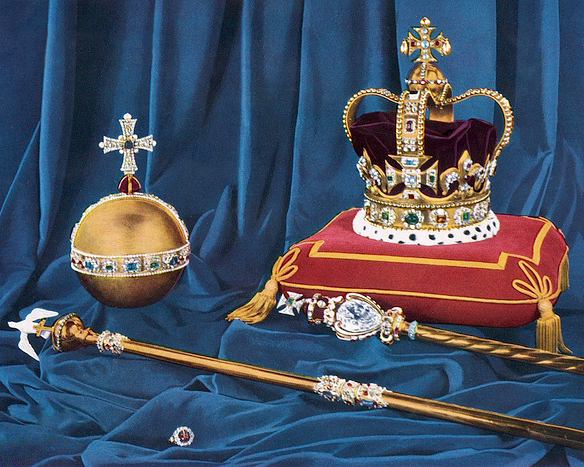
The Jewel House, containing the British Crown Jewels (pictured), was edited in Traitors Gate following security concerns from Tower of London management.

In January 1998, Daydream Software announced "Project II" as Traitors Gate and scheduled its public unveiling for the following month, at the Milia festival in Cannes. Employment agency Octagon Entertainment, with which Daydream had signed after buying back Safecracker's rights from GT Interactive in November 1997, was set to begin locating distribution partners for Traitors Gate in February. Finished contracts were not forecast until May. As with Safecracker, the strategy was to work with a different local distributor in each territory. Jan Phersson-Broberg reported interest from distributors after Milia, but reiterated to investors that no deals would be signed before May, when a playable game demo was planned to appear at the Electronic Entertainment Expo (E3). While the game was initially set for a late-1998 launch, by June of that year the release had been pushed back to early 1999. Distribution agreements remained pending after the game's E3 presentation.

According to Nigel Papworth, development of Traitors Gate was "much more difficult" than originally expected, and a significantly greater challenge than Safecracker had been. The focus on reproducing the Tower of London left the team unable to alter the scope of the project, and forced Daydream to opt for realistic puzzles tied to the world, in comparison to the simpler task of designing Safecracker's more abstract puzzles. A nonlinear design approach was planned from the start, as Papworth noted that Daydream was "allergic" to linear gameplay, but this further increased the difficulty of Traitors Gate's creation for the designers and programmers. The average team size was seven members throughout production, although other employees cycled in and out of the project as needed. Despite the focus on realism, the team modified sections of the Jewel House at the request of the Tower of London's management, who were concerned that the game's accuracy could pose a security risk for the building. The sewer system was also partly fictionalized, although influenced by real data and the actual positions of manhole covers.

Daydream elected to use pre-rendered graphics instead of real-time 3D visuals on Traitors Gate because the team preferred an "above-standard graphics environment to the advantage of free 3D motion", according to Papworth. The slow pace of the game was a contributing factor to this decision, as Papworth noted that the "loss of a little mobility" did not hinder the design. Animated cutscene transitions between screens were added to increase player immersion, in hopes of making up for the lack of free movement. For the character animation, instead of using motion capture, first-time character animators Fredrik Johnson and Leif Holm worked manually. Ultimately, the decision to use pre-rendering brought the game's final size before data compression to 10 terabytes. Papworth later said that the production methods used in Traitors Gate were seen at Daydream as "too costly and time consuming to be a viable long term solution" for the company, which led it, including members of the Traitors Gate team, to make the concurrently-developed Clusterball.

Five members of Daydream handled the creation of Traitors Gate's models and textures. Modeling was initially delegated to Papworth, Holm, Johnson and Ulf Larsson. At roughly the 12-month mark, Papworth transitioned more fully into game design and writing, and his place on the modeling team was taken by Michael Nahal. The team began by drawing building plans on transparent vellum, based on information obtained from second-hand books, the Internet, the Royal Archives and Daydream's personal reference photographs. Working with Autodesk Maya and PowerAnimator 6.5, the team then created wire frames based on these plans, using four SGI O2 and SGI Indy computers. Textures were created in Painter, Adobe Photoshop and Adobe Illustrator, while the finished graphics were rendered on a farm of SGI Challenges and systems running Windows NT. Hardware upgrades were frequent during production. According to Papworth, the models and textures took two years of "60 hour weeks" to complete. The White Tower structure, delegated to Johnson, required nearly six months of labor by itself.

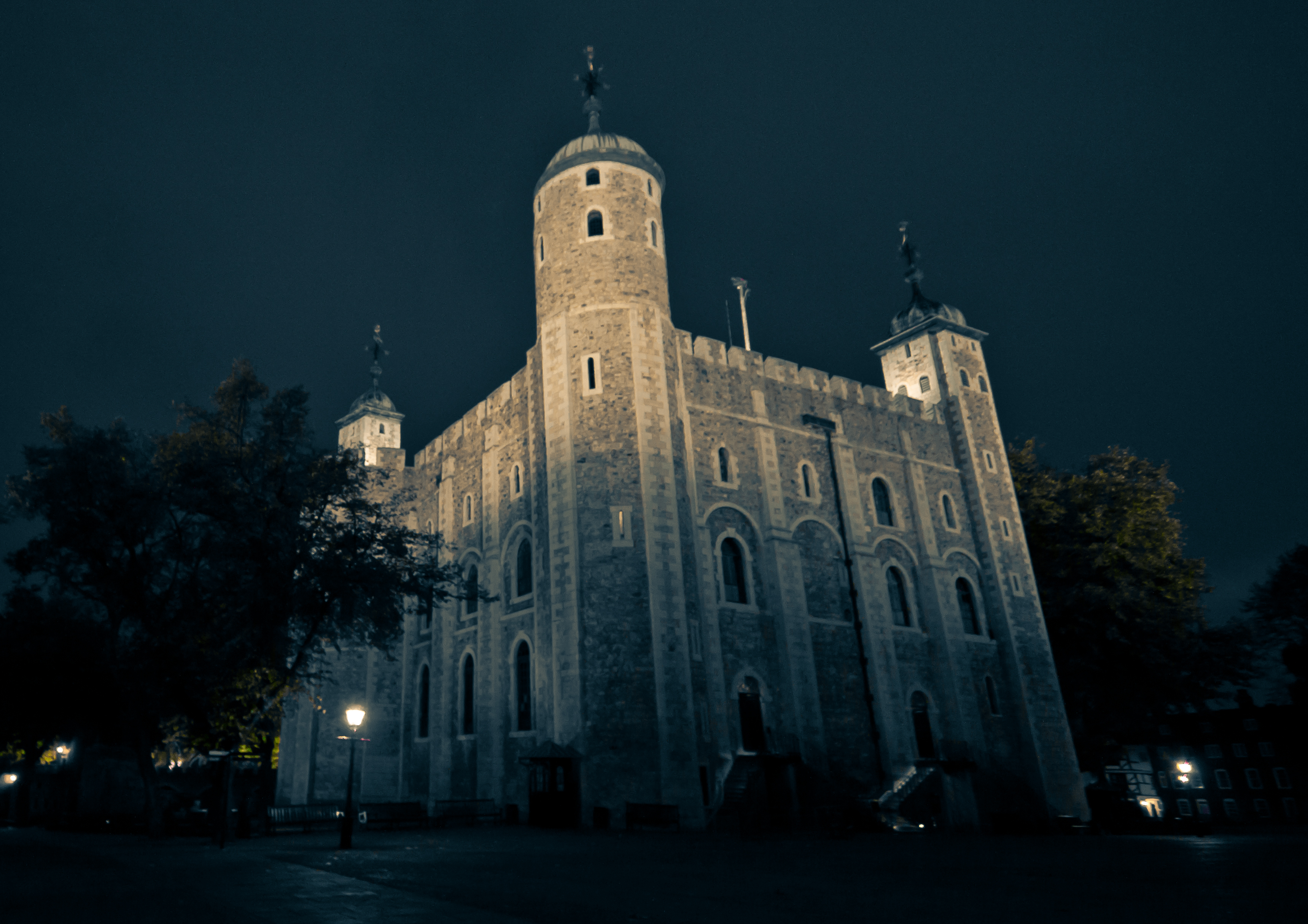
Modeling the White Tower required nearly six months of work by artist Fredrik Johnson.

Traitors Gate was built with Live Picture Inc.'s RealVR tool, software that displays virtual-reality photographic panoramas. Papworth explained that the techniques Daydream developed while working on Safecracker, a game created with QuickTime VR, had since been incorporated into the newer RealVR software suite. The decision to move to RealVR was heavily inspired by the software's ability to display spherical 360° panoramas, a necessity given the tall structures modeled in Traitors Gate. To construct the game's panoramic environments, Erik Phersson implemented image stitching with BBEdit and Live Picture's PhotoVista editing software, combining multiple rendered stills from the graphics team into larger images. The panoramas were made playable and interactive by Peter Lundholm, with the tools DeBabelizer and Macromedia Director. Phersson also handled Traitors Gate's sound effects, added to the game environments with MacPaint and SoundEdit.

The soundtrack was created by local musicians Toontrack, which comprised Mattias Eklund and Henrik Kjellberg. Their opportunity to join Traitors Gate came because Eklund had played in a band with Phersson and Leif Holm during the development of Safecracker. As that title's production wrapped, Toontrack spent a week on an eight-minute demo to pitch Daydream for its next game. Afterward, Phersson hired the pair to score an early build of Traitors Gate, and their involvement grew from there. Eklund and Kjellberg used the programs WaveLab and Cubase VST to compose Traitors Gate's music, which was made with a combination of sampled, synthesized and live instrumentation. The pair relied on Oberheim Matrix 1000 and Yamaha A3000 synthesizers, a Yamaha AES1500 and a Roland GR-1 for the synthetic and live elements. The soundtrack was purposely limited in-game to build atmosphere, and, according to Toontrack, was written in the style of "sixties and seventies" spy films to match the theme of Traitors Gate.

At the 1998 European Computer Trade Show (ECTS), Daydream landed distributors for Traitors Gate in eight countries. By the end of September, completion of the game was scheduled for fall; development costs had climbed to 8.06 million kr by late November. In January 1999, Daydream set a release date of April, and confirmed K.E. Media as the game's distributor in Sweden, Denmark and Norway. Deals with companies in France, Italy, Britain and the Netherlands were secured by February. However, as the year progressed, Traitors Gate encountered a four-month delay to fall 1999. This event was blamed by Daydream on numerous software bugs, caused by the game's "size and complexity". It proceeded to appear at E3 1999, and development costs rose to 10.6 million kr by the end of May, with 2.03 million of this figure depreciated through capitalization. Papworth estimated the final budget for Traitors Gate as between $1 and $2 million in United States currency. Following the public launch of Traitors Gate's demo in June 1999, Daydream brought the game to gold status late that July.

=== Release ===
Traitors Gate was first released in early September 1999, after roughly three years of development. It was shipped on four CD-ROMs. By the end of its debut month, the game had launched in seven countries: Sweden, Ireland, Belgium, Denmark, Norway, England and the Netherlands. Daydream Software told investors on September 30 that Traitors Gate would appear in another 14 countries by March 2000. Further launches occurred in New Zealand and Australia on October 31, through Hilad Corporation; in France on November 29, through Éditions Profil; and in Spain on December 16, through FX Interactive. It was the latter company's first published game. Traitors Gate had received translations into 10 languages by December 10, at which time Daydream reported its lifetime "guaranteed sales volume" as above 100,000 units.

Before Traitors Gate's release, Nigel Papworth noted his "hope that this title gets the crack it deserves at the American Market", following Safecracker's failure to penetrate the region. According to Papworth, North America's buying power was equivalent to the rest of the world's combined, and it was "seen as the paramount market to crack" for international developers at the time. In early November 1999, Daydream signed with publisher DreamCatcher Interactive to distribute the game in North America. As was typical, the deal was set up by Daydream's agency, Octagon Entertainment, based in North Carolina. Thanks to DreamCatcher's partnership network, Traitors Gate was initially set to appear in 15 North American retail chains, including Best Buy, Virgin Megastores and CompUSA. The game's availability was planned in nearly 2,000 individual stores across North America. It launched in the region on May 15, 2000.

Traitors Gate had seen releases in 27 countries by April 28, 2000. At the time, Daydream announced new deals with distributors to release the game in Korea, Poland, Taiwan and Greece. The company reported sales forecasts of "approximately 15,000 games" for each of these regions. In June, the game launched in the Tower of London gift shop, which made it the only video game available there at the time.

== Reception ==
=== Sales and distribution ===
Traitors Gate was commercially successful and became Daydream Software's top-selling game by 2003. It sold 48,000 units worldwide by the end of May 2000, and was a hit in Spain, which accounted for 22,000 sales by April 10. The game spent over three months in the top 10 of Spain's sales charts. However, it was a commercial failure in Germany, where it sold 4,000 copies; in the United Kingdom, which bought 3,000 units; and in Italy. The European Foundation for the Improvement of Living and Working Conditions (Eurofound) traced Traitors Gate's country-by-country success rate to the quality of Daydream's distribution partners in each region. By September 30, worldwide sales of the game had risen to roughly 120,000 copies. Daydream told investors that the jump from May came due to "increased marketing efforts by us and our distributors".

Writing for Adventure Gamers, Marek Bronstring noted that "slow" initial sales for Traitors Gate gave way to significant success, beginning around one year into its shelf life. September 2000 became the first-ever month that Daydream turned a net profit, in part thanks to the sales increase of Traitors Gate. The game surpassed 200,000 units sold globally by the end of March 2001 and reached close to 250,000 sales by June 30. That July, it topped 50,000 lifetime sales in Spain. According to the Eurofound, Traitors Gate was also successful in the United States, which the group wrote was "primarily because a huge supermarket chain" in the region had opted to stock it. It accounted for 14% of DreamCatcher Interactive's sales in 2000. This made it one of the publisher's top titles that year, behind Atlantis II and The Crystal Key. The following year, PC Data calculated the game's retail sales in North America at 52,573 units for 2001 alone.

Globally, Traitors Gate sold more than 300,000 copies by March 2002. During the first six months of that year, PC Data tracked another 15,429 sales in North American retailers. By 2003, Traitors Gate had sold between 300,000 and 400,000 copies worldwide, of which Spain accounted for 75,000 units. According to DreamCatcher, the game totaled 245,000 lifetime sales in North America alone by early 2003.

=== Critical reviews ===
Reception

Review scores
Publication	Score
Computer Games Magazine	3/5
GameSpot	7.8/10
PC Gamer (UK)	28%
PC PowerPlay	78/100
PC Zone	29%
MacHome Journal	4/5
PC Gaming World	6/10
Just Adventure	A

Awards
Publication	Award
British Academy Film Awards	The Design Award (nominated)
GameSpot	Best Adventure Game 2000 (nominated)

According to the review aggregation site Metacritic, critical reception of Traitors Gate was "mixed or average". The game was nominated for "The Design Award" at the 1999 British Academy Film Awards (BAFTAs), but lost the prize to Wipeout 3. The BAFTAs' judges called Traitors Gate a "very well researched and well considered game with intuitive game play", and praised its controls and its depiction of the Tower of London. It was also a finalist for GameSpot's 2000 "Best Adventure Game" award, which ultimately went to The Longest Journey.

Comparing the game to Spycraft: The Great Game, GameSpot's Ron Dulin praised the puzzles in Traitors Gate, which he felt were sensible and realistic, alongside its detailed reproduction of the Tower of London. Despite encountering numerous technical problems with the software, he considered the overall product "very good", but short of outstanding. Cal Jones of PC Gaming World similarly praised the puzzles and visual detail, but noted a slight blurriness to the graphics and found the game brief despite its "nice covert feel". She ultimately gave it a moderate rating.

By contrast, Tim Cant wrote in PC Gamer UK that Traitors Gate is a boring title, which contributes "nothing to an already-tedious genre". He condemned its puzzles, pace and control system. Cant's complaints were echoed in PC Zone, whose writer Mark Hill called the game dull and dismissed its puzzles as "childish". Hill and Cant both strongly critiqued Traitors Gate's graphics, which they considered bland and unengaging. Writing that the game's real "adventure is trying to keep your interest alive for more than five minutes", Hill gave Traitors Gate a "below average" rating. However, while David Ryan Hunt agreed in Computer Games Magazine that "too many flaws ... detract from the fun" in Traitors Gate, he sided with Dulin and Jones on the quality of the graphics and puzzles, which he felt were largely solid.

Audrey Wells of Computer Gaming World continued Hunt's, Dulin's and Jones' praise for the puzzles, and again cited the visual representation of the Tower as a high point. Despite noting that the sewer maze portions of Traitors Gate make it "more suitable for experienced gamers", Wells enjoyed the game and did not criticize its use of mazes. Just Adventure's Ray Ivey took an even stronger line of support for the game. In contrast to Hill's and Tim Cant's dismissals of Traitors Gate as boring, he labeled the proceedings "breathlessly exciting" and "indecently fun", and praised the mazes' execution outright. On this latter point, Hunt diverged sharply with both Ivey and Wells: he regarded these sections as the chief problem with Traitors Gate, as a detriment to the title's immersion and as "a potential game-killer" that limited Traitors Gate almost exclusively to hardcore genre fans. As a result, he summarized the game as a middling "experience [that] isn't likely to become something you'll cherish".

Ivey and the writer for MacHome Journal both advanced Computer Gaming World's, GameSpot's and PC Gaming World's praise for the recreation of the Tower of London in Traitors Gate, which MacHome's reviewer considered to be arguably its greatest strength. The writer noted that it had "been quite a while since an adventure of this nature has genuinely held my interest" like Traitors Gate. Similarly, David Wildgoose of PC PowerPlay dubbed Traitors Gate "a must for quality-starved adventure gamers". Like Hunt and Wells, both of whom had called the title "a refreshing change of pace" for adventure games, Wildgoose singled out its atypical theme for praise. He cited it as an unusually tense entry in its genre and highlighted its "genuinely clever and suspenseful design". At the same time, he found its pacing slow and awkward, and criticized the game for overwhelming the player with "too much information far too quickly" in its introduction of the utility gear. Like Mark Hill, he also disapproved of the large HUD. Following Wildgoose's criticism of the restrictions on player movement in Traitors Gate, the critic for MacHome noted that the game lacks "a sense of freedom", but nevertheless praised its nonlinear structure. Its bugs and ending sequence were the reviewer's primary dislikes.

== Sequel ==
Based on its success with Traitors Gate in North America, publisher DreamCatcher Interactive commissioned a sequel, Traitors Gate 2: Cypher. Daydream Software told investors that a deal with "an internationally recognized publisher" to develop the game was reached in April 2002, and that it was funded ahead of time by this outside party. The project was scheduled for a 14-month development cycle. Traitors Gate 2 was ultimately developed by the company 258 Productions. Nigel Papworth, who conceived and designed the game at 258, said that he had been resistant to developing another title with pre-rendered visuals. Instead, he told DreamCatcher that he would work on the sequel only if it is made in real-time 3D. He felt that graphics technology had advanced enough to make this leap, and that the switch offered him a great amount of freedom for the gameplay. As a result, the team licensed the Gamebryo engine to create Traitors Gate 2.

Inspired by his "reading an article on cryptography technique at the same time as a book on Babylonian history", Papworth combined these two ideas to create the game concept for Traitors Gate 2. First announced as Cypher: The Sequel to Traitors Gate in April 2003, Traitors Gate 2 casts the player again as Raven, who now seeks to thwart the plot of Middle Eastern terrorists and a treacherous American agent. It was released in October to "generally negative reviews", according to Metacritic.

== See also ==
- Dracula: Resurrection
- Faust
- Riddle of the Sphinx: An Egyptian Adventure
