= The Secret of the Nautilus =

2002 video game

- Developer: Cryo Interactive
- Publishers: EU: Cryo Interactive; NA: DreamCatcher Interactive/The Adventure Company
- Platform: Windows
- Release: EU: 2002; NA: April 29, 2002
- Genre: First-person fantasy adventure
- Mode: Single-player

The Secret of the Nautilus (French: Le Secret du Nautilus, known as The Mystery of the Nautilus in the US) is a 2002 adventure video game, inspired by Jules Verne's 1870 science fiction novel Twenty Thousand Leagues Under the Seas. It was developed by Cryo Interactive and released for Microsoft Windows based PCs.

== Development ==
The characters in The Secret of the Nautilus are based on original 19th century engravings as published in Jules Verne's 1870 novel Twenty Thousand Leagues Under the Seas, despite the game taking place in the 21st century. These characters include Némo, and a giant octopus. The game is similar in theme to The Adventure Company's later games which include Return to Mysterious Island and its sequel, and Voyage: Inspired by Jules Verne.

An official press release launching the game was published in Aachen in January 2002. One month later, Adventure Archiv released a preview and reported the game was due to be released on European shelves in March of that year. The preview displayed the main character with new facial features. Cryo Interactive also assigned the project to the new development studio T-Bot, which incorporated a new game design. The game was also reported to be coming out on CD and DVD for the MAC, but the release dates of these versions were not yet known.

== Plot ==
The game is set under the sea in the 21st century, where during a scientific assignment, a young oceanographer enters into a strange type of submarine hidden on an undersea rock shelf. The vessel turns out to be the famous Nautilus which was abandoned a great many years earlier by Captain Nemo.

== Gameplay ==
The game plays as a Myst-clone first-person adventure game, in which the player navigates through a series of computer generated screens to interact with the environment and solve puzzles.

== Reception ==
By 2004, global sales of The Secret of the Nautilus had surpassed 117,000 copies.

Süddeutsche Zeitung felt that while the game would attract fans of Jules Verne, they would become dismayed by the game's combination puzzles. Reviewer Four Fat Chicks felt the small hotspots, and timed sections let the game down.

Reception

Review scores
| Publication | Score |
|---|---|
| Metzomagic | 3/5 |
| Gry Online | 4.3/10 |
| Adventure Archiv | 60% |
| Old PC Gaming | 2/5 stars |
| Bonusweb.cz | 67% |
| Gamezone.de | Negative |
| Przygodoskop | 1/5 |
| Spazio Games | 7.5/10 |
| 4Players | 62% |
| Just Adventure (Ray Ivey) | C |
| Just Adventure (Robert Freese) | B |
| GameOver | 69% |
| JeuxPCVideo | Mixed |
| Computer Idea | 6.5/10 |

== See also ==
- List of underwater science fiction works
