= Case Closed: The Mirapolis Investigation =

2007 video game

- Developer: Imageepoch
- Publishers: JP: Marvelous Interactive; EU: Nobilis
- Series: Case Closed
- Platform: Wii
- Release: JP: May 17, 2007; EU: May 1, 2009
- Genre: Adventure
- Mode: Single-player

Case Closed: The Mirapolis Investigation, known in Japan as Meitantei Conan: Tsuioku no Mirage (名探偵コナン 追憶の幻想(ミラージュ), Meitantei Konan: Tsuioku no Mirāju; lit. 'Detective Conan: Mirage of Remembrance'), is a video game for the Wii. It is based upon the popular anime and manga series Case Closed by Gosho Aoyama. Players use the Wii Remote to find clues and solve the cases.

== Gameplay ==
Characters are designed in 3D models. During gameplay, the Wii Remote is used to solve cases in a point and click fashion (similar to games like Sam & Max and the Monkey Island series). There are times when Conan may be controlled as an actual character. There is an arcade mode where Conan travels around in an arcade where the players are able to play minigames.

== Plot ==
The game follows Conan, Mouri, Ran, and The Junior Detective League as they are invited to the opening of a new hotel called The Mirapolis. On the first day, someone is murdered, and Conan must find out who did it.
