= Nostradamus: The Last Prophecy =

2007 video game

- Developers: Kheops Studio, Mzone Studio, TOTM Studio, Anuman Interactive
- Publishers: Elektrogames, Kheops Studio, Mzone Studio, TOTM Studio, MC2, Encore, Anuman Interactive
- Platforms: Windows, Mac OS X, iOS
- Release: Windows: EU: November 14, 2007; NA: September 23, 2008; Mac OS X June 2010 iOS; December 18, 2010 (Part 1); January 28, 2011 (Part 2)
- Genre: Adventure
- Mode: Single-player

Nostradamus: The Last Prophecy is an adventure video game developed by Kheops, Mzone and Totm. It was a co-production by Elektrogames, Kheops Studio, MC2, Mzone, Totm, and Anuman Interactive, and is published in the US by MC2.

== Plot ==
The game takes place in March 1566, in Salon-de-Provence, France, when the court of King Charles IX is touring France. His mother, Catherine de Medici, who is the victim of a strange curse, lost power 3 years previously. She decides to pay a visit to her doctor and astrologer, Michel de Nostre-Dame, better known as Nostradamus, but he is too fatigued to help her. It is his daughter Madeleine, under the false identity of her brother César, who offers her services to the queen mother. The player alternates between Madeleine's true self or disguised as César, depending on the situation to search through political scheming and ancestral prophecies.

== Reception ==
Reception

Aggregate score
Aggregator	Score
Metacritic	70/100

Review scores
Publication	Score
Adventure Gamers	4/5
Gamekult	6/10
GamesRadar+	3.5/5
GameStar	71%
Gamezebo	80/100
GameZone	6.3/10
IGN	7.4/10
Jeuxvideo.com	15/20
PC Zone	69%

The PC version received "mixed or average reviews" according to the review aggregation website Metacritic. Emily Balistrieri of IGN wrote that the game wouldn't appeal to the players if they didn't feel like learning about astrology.
