= Echo: Secrets of the Lost Cavern =

2005 video game

- North American cover art
- Developer: Kheops Studio
- Publishers: The Adventure Company; Coladia Games (Mac, iOS)
- Platforms: Windows, Mac OS X, iOS
- Release: Windows: GER: June 11, 2005; NA/UK: July 5, 2005; Mac OS X November 2008 iOS; 2010
- Genre: Adventure
- Mode: Single-player

Echo: Secrets of the Lost Cavern (known in Europe as Secret of the Lost Cavern) is a computer adventure game released in 2005. It was developed by Kheops Studio and published by The Adventure Company. It is very similar to previous Kheops Studio games; the interface and gameplay are almost identical to Return to Mysterious Island. The player takes the role of Arok, a 15-year-old European Homo sapiens from the Paleolithic period.

== Plot ==
Secret of the Lost Cavern is set in the Paleolithic period around 15,000 B.C. The game follows Arok, a young hunter who discovers a cavern marked with a strange symbol. It reminds him of a charismatic traveler, Klem, who ventured through the lands of his clan a few years before. Klem is a painter and sorcerer with the gift of speaking with the spirits of the world through the paintings he creates on cave walls. Arok spent many days with this shaman artist, fascinated by his creations and his stories. After noticing the painter's talent in the cavern, Arok decides not to return to his clan, but rather follow the path of his mentor.

== Reception ==
Reception

Aggregate score
Aggregator	Score
Metacritic	71/100

Review scores
Publication	Score
4Players	59%
Adventure Gamers	3.5/5
GameSpot	6.5/10
GameStar	47%
Gamezebo	80/100
GameZone	7.5/10
Jeuxvideo.com	12/20
PC Format	51%
PC Games (DE)	72%
X-Play	3/5
The New York Times	(mixed)

The PC version received "mixed or average reviews" according to the review aggregation website Metacritic.

Mark Smith of Game Chronicles thought the game offered a breath of fresh air in a category of boring and badly designed adventure games. Bodo Naser of 4Players noted that generic puzzles had been included to artificially lengthen the game's play time. Charles Herold of The New York Times called the game "painfully sincere" and found that its "story is a perfunctory vehicle for puzzles and a little anthropological teaching."
