= Daydream Software =

Swedish video game developer and publisher

- Type: Public
- Industry: Video games Poker
- Founded: November 1994
- Defunct: 2011
- Headquarters: Umeå, Sweden
- Key people: Jan Phersson-Broberg; Erik Phersson; Nigel Papworth

Daydream Software was a Swedish video game developer and publisher founded in 1994. In July 2006, they renamed to 24hPoker Holding AB, and in 2007, to Entraction Holding AB and changed their operation to poker. In May 2011, they were taken over by International Game Technology.

== History ==
=== Early years (1994–1996) ===
Daydream Software was established in November 1994 in Umeå, Sweden. Its founding members were Jan Phersson-Broburg, Erik Phersson, Jörgen Isaksson, Nigel Papworth and Leif Holm. All but Papworth were employees of Sombrero AB, a local computer services company co-founded by Isaksson and the Phersson brothers in 1993. Daydream initially formed for the purpose of making Safecracker, a project conceived earlier in 1994 by Papworth and Isaksson, influenced by Myst and the board game Mastermind. The company's founders chose to make nonviolent gameplay their guiding principle in Safecracker and all future titles. Daydream soon obtained a handshake deal with publisher Warner Music Sweden for Safecracker, but this arrangement fell through shortly after. However, the Safecracker plan was revived during the 1994 Christmas party at Daydream's new office space, when the team was contacted by Warner Interactive Entertainment (WIE) about the game.

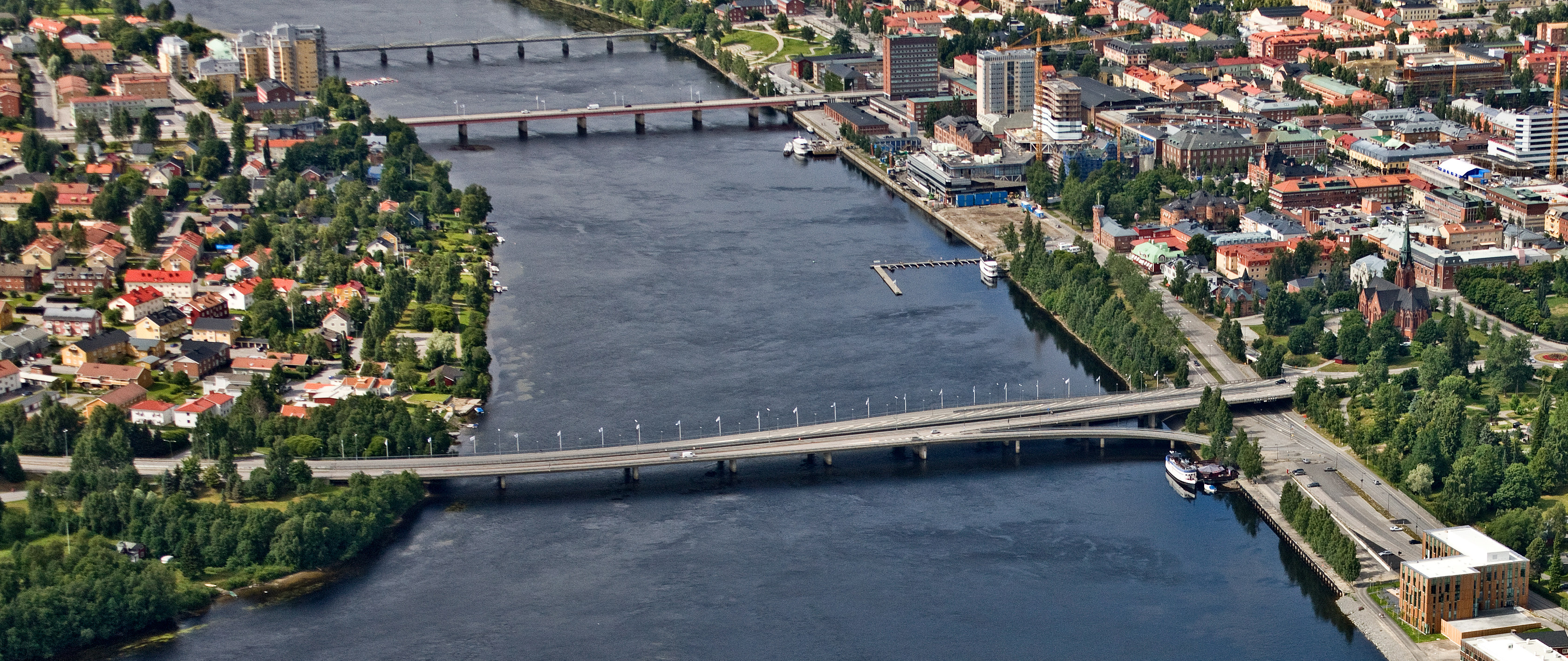
Daydream Software was among Sweden's earliest major computer game companies, and was the only game developer in Umeå (pictured) by 1996.

Following a period of negotiations, Daydream signed with WIE in March 1995, as part of a three-year, multi-title deal set to run until March 1998. Funding was provided via an advance against royalties of 2.5 million kr; Daydream was set to earn 50 kr per unit sold, while Warner retained all revenues for the first 50,000 sales of the game. In retrospect, Papworth felt that Daydream was "lucky" to have joined the game industry when it did, as many of "the big record companies" were entering the computer game business with low standards as to the content they financed. Safecracker had a tumultuous production, starting when GT Interactive bought initial publisher Warner Interactive Europe.

=== Public offering and expansion (1997–2000) ===
Daydream Software went public in late 1996. The company's goal was to increase its economic and decision-making freedom, and to secure the ability to select a publisher at the end of each game's development rather than at the beginning. President Jans Phersson-Broburg argued that self-financing Daydream's future games with money from Swedish investors, instead of obtaining "funding linked to specific projects" from publishers, would offer the developer more stability, flexibility and room for growth. For Daydream's public launch, roughly 20 million kr worth of shares, or 45.5% of the company, were offered to investors in Sweden. The initial public offering was a success, and Daydream opened on the Stockholm Stock Exchange's Stockholm Börsinformation (SBI) list in January 1997. Daydream was eventually able to buy back the rights to Safecracker.

Their next title would be Traitors Gate (a game initially pitched to GT Interactive in 1996), an adventure game using an interface similar to Safecracker but with an espionage theme. The game was released in 1999 and (as with Safecracker) was published by DreamCatcher Interactive. The game received mostly positive reviews, and proved a financial success for the company, selling over 300,000 copies.

Daydream's next game was a more ambitious title called Clusterball, a futuristic sports game released in late 2000 for PC computers after a successful run as a downloadable title on Real.com. The game garnered mixed to positive reviews but low sales for the company.

=== Final years (2001–2003) ===
Their next project was Ski-Doo: X-Team Racing, a snowmobile racing game. The title was released by Simon & Schuster Interactive in 2001 for PC computers. The game received little media attention.

In 2003, the company announced Campfire: Become Your Nightmare, for the Microsoft Xbox and Sony PlayStation 2 consoles. It was dubbed as a "reverse survival horror game" (similar to Rockstar's Manhunt and 505 Games' Naughty Bear) that put the player in the role of a serial killer on a campground. The game was inspired by slasher films of the 1970s and 1980s. However, the game received little press other than a live-action trailer and concept artwork. It was cancelled in 2004 for unknown reasons. The rights to Campfire were eventually sold first to Gamefederation and then to Nordic VFX Company AB in 2007 with a planned release around Halloween 2009 for mobile phones, PS3, Xbox 360 and PC. That version was also never heard of again.

== Renaming ==
Up to 2006 Daydream Software developed and published different mobile games. In 2006 they renamed themself to 24hPoker Holding AB. They moved their operations to online gambling. One year later they announced another renaming to Entraction Holding AB. In May 2011 they were taken over by International Game Technology.

Most employees moving on to form a new development company: Resolution Interactive, which focused on iPhone games. The company filed for bankruptcy in 2012.

== Associated titles ==
Most of Daydream Software's games were continued by other companies later.

- Safecracker received an unrelated sequel for the Nintendo DS and Nintendo Wii, as well as PC computers in 2006 by The Adventure Company called Safecracker: The Ultimate Puzzle Adventure.
- Traitors Gate 2: Cypher was released in 2003, also by The Adventure Company. The game is unrelated to the original and, unlike its predecessor, the game was universally panned by critics.
- Clusterball received a sequel, originally titled Clusterball 2 and renamed Clusterball Arcade, for the iPhone in 2008.

== Games developed ==
- Safecracker (1997)
- Traitors Gate (1999)
- Clusterball (2000)
- Ski-Doo: X-Team Racing (2001)
- Happy Tree Friends: Spin Fun (2005)
- Botfighters
- Bouncy
- Netbaby Grand Prix Ghosting Version
- Campfire: Become Your Nightmare (cancelled)
