= Traitors Gate 2: Cypher =

2003 video game

- Developers: 258 Productions AB, Data Ductus AB
- Publisher: The Adventure Company
- Platform: Windows
- Release: NA: October 28, 2003; EU: 2004
- Genre: Graphic adventure game
- Mode: Single-player

Traitors Gate 2: Cypher is a 2003 graphic adventure game developed by Swedish studios 258 Productions AB and Data Ductus AB and published by The Adventure Company. It is the sequel to Daydream Software's game Traitors Gate.

== Development ==
Traitors Gate 2 was commissioned by The Adventure Company following its success with the North America release of Daydream Software's Traitors Gate, which sold roughly 250,000 units in the region by August 2003. Daydream told its investors that a deal with "an internationally recognized publisher" to develop the sequel was reached in April 2002, and that it was funded ahead of time by this outside party. The project was scheduled for a 14-month development cycle. Traitors Gate 2 was ultimately developed by the company 258 Productions. Nigel Papworth, who conceived and designed the game at 258, recalled that he had been resistant to developing another title with pre-rendered visuals. Instead, he told DreamCatcher that he would work on the sequel only if it is made in real-time 3D. He felt that graphics technology had advanced enough to make this leap, and that the switch offered him a great amount of freedom for the gameplay. As a result, the team licensed the Gamebryo engine to create Traitors Gate 2. The game was originally set for a September 2003 release.

Papworth based Traitors Gate 2 on ancient Babylon, inspired by his reading an article on cryptography technique at the same time as a book on Babylonian history. He proceeded to combine the two to create the game concept. The game was first announced as Cypher: The Sequel to Traitors Gate in April 2003, following a teaser in July 2002 under the working title Traitors Gate II.

== Reception ==
Reception

Aggregate score
Aggregator	Score
Metacritic	37/100

Review scores
Publication	Score
Adventure Gamers	1/5
Computer Games Magazine	1/5
GameSpot	4.0/10

Traitors Gate 2 received "generally negative reviews", according to review aggregation website Metacritic. Cindy Yans of Computer Games Magazine wrote that there was "nothing really redeeming" about the game. Jim Saighman of Adventure Gamers summarized it as "[p]ossibly the worst adventure game" of 2003.
