= Crime Scene (video game) =

2009 video game

- Developer: White Birds Productions
- Publishers: FRA: Nobilis; NA: SouthPeak Games
- Platform: Nintendo DS
- Release: FRA: July 24, 2009; NA: February 16, 2010
- Genre: Adventure
- Mode: Single-player

Crime Scene (also known as Criminology) is an adventure game for the Nintendo DS.

== Plot ==
Newly appointed forensics detective Matt Simmons must solve his first case, which is the double murder of a co-worker and his wife.

== Gameplay ==
Players use the touch screen to access certain features which can be used to solve crimes, including a messaging system which allows the player to be told clues from NPCs. The player can also interview NPCs that they encounter. The stylus can be used to scan the crime scene and the color of the cursor will change to indicate that the player has found an important object. Collecting evidence requires the player to pick up the piece of evidence and put it in a bucket of solution, and pressing a button when a meter appears to try to get the object to stay in the solution. The players have the ability to dust for fingerprints by using a brush to leave powder over the prints and blowing into the microphone to remove excess dust. DNA can be analyzed by using a pipette to put the material onto a slide. The stylus can then be used to remove unwanted cells so that only the evidence is present. The player also has a credibility meter which will change depending on the players actions throughout the game.

== Reception ==
Reception

Aggregate score
Aggregator	Score
Metacritic	54/100

Review scores
Publication	Score
4Players	38%
Adventure Gamers	1/5
Gamekult	6/10
Jeuxvideo.com	14/20
Nintendo Power	5/10
411Mania	6.5/10

The game received "mixed" reviews according to the review aggregation website Metacritic. Randy Nelson of Nintendo Power said that while the game was able to replicate the feel of crime scene investigations, it falters with unimaginative case files, "poorly translated" writing and basic game mechanics.
