= The Secrets of Da Vinci: The Forbidden Manuscript =

2006 video game

- Developer: Kheops Studio
- Publisher: Tri Synergy
- Director: Olivier Train
- Designer: Marianne Tostivint
- Platforms: Windows, Mac OS X, iOS
- Release: Windows: EU: May 12, 2006; NA: June 7, 2006; Mac OS X October 8, 2009 iOS; January 27, 2011
- Genre: Adventure

The Secrets of Da Vinci: The Forbidden Manuscript is an adventure game developed by Kheops Studio and published by Tri Synergy for Windows. In 2009 it was released on the Mac OS X.

== Gameplay and plot ==
This is an investigatory game set in 1522 at Da Vinci's last home, the Cloux Manor.

Gameplay is standard for 3D first-person adventure games.

== Development ==
This game was a co-production between Nobilis, Elektrogames, TOTM Studio, Kheops Studio, Mzone Studio, in collaboration with the Clos Lucé. It was the first ever game created about the life and work of Leonardo da Vinci. In September 2005, the project was originally announced as Da Vinci Experience, but this was changed to its current title in January 2006. It came out at a time when the culture was saturated with Da Vinci (including a book, film, and competing video game). Marianne Tostivint believes The Da Vinci Code projects helped get this game be sold to a publisher and financed. A lot of effort was put into making the Clos Lucé as historically accurate as possible. The designers had three key focuses to ensure an optimum player experience: gameplay, ergonomy, and interfaces. In terms of educational goals, the designers wanted to make the game as historically accurate as it was fun to play. Coladia (who owned the publishing rights at this time) announced the release of the title on iOS devices in February 2011.

According to the Agence pour le développement économique de la région lyonnaise (ADERLY), Nobilis planned The Secrets of Da Vinci to be a hit. The publisher reportedly "hope[d] to sell at least 100,000 copies of this game in France and exceed one million units worldwide".

== Reception ==
Reception

Aggregate score
Aggregator	Score
Metacritic	69/100

Review scores
Publication	Score
4Players	66%
Adventure Gamers	4/5
Computer Games Magazine	3/5
Eurogamer	6/10
Gamekult	6/10
GameSpot	6.5/10
GameZone	6.3/10
IGN	7.1/10
Jeuxvideo.com	16/20
MacLife	(Mac) 3/5
PC Gamer (US)	80%
PopMatters	6/10

The PC version received "average" reviews according to the review aggregation website Metacritic.

IGN concluded that the game was neither difficult nor compelling. GameZone felt the game didn't offer much motivation to the player to solve puzzles and advance the plot. Eurogamer thought it was pleasurable, even if it wasn't particularly groundbreaking. PopMatters felt the game tread to far into the uncanny valley. Jeuxvideo.com noted that the title had replay value due to the different ways in which players can complete puzzles.
