= Nobilis (company) =

French video game publishing and distribution company

- Company type: Société anonyme
- Industry: Video games
- Founded: 2001
- Defunct: 2013; 12 years ago
- Fate: Dissolved
- Headquarters: Limonest, France
- Products: Video games, accessories
- Brands: Subsonic

Nobilis was a French video game publishing and distribution company founded in 2001 in the Lyon metropolitan area and dissolved in 2013. Nobilis also distributed and produced accessories for consoles under the Subsonic brand, whose activity continued after the judicial liquidation of Nobilis.

== History ==
=== Origins and development ===
Nobilis was founded in 2001 in the Lyon metropolitan area by Arnaud Blacher, Pierre de Laporte, and Eric Pernelle, three former directors of Infogrames (now Atari SA). The company's headquarters were initially located in Champagne-au-Mont-d'Or, then moved to Dardilly and a few years later to Limonest.

As a public limited company, the company was a publisher and distributor of video games for PC and consoles (Xbox, Xbox 360, PlayStation 2, Nintendo Wii, PSP, GameCube, Nintendo DS, Game Boy Advance). The company also distributed and produced accessories for consoles under the Subsonic brand, particularly for Xbox 360, PlayStation 2, PlayStation 3, Nintendo Wii, GameCube, PSP, and Nintendo DS platforms.

During its early years, Nobilis experienced rapid growth in its business. The company recorded a turnover of 3.5 million euros in its first fiscal year. By 2003, the company employed 30 people with an annual turnover of 16 million euros. In 2005, the company achieved a turnover of 20 million euros and claimed to have been profitable since its inception. In the context of this rapid expansion, Nobilis opened subsidiaries in Madrid, Brussels, and Rome.

=== Financial difficulties and liquidation ===
In 2009, Nobilis faced financial difficulties in a deteriorating video game market in France, particularly in the Nintendo DS game distribution segment. Between late 2008 and summer 2009, Nobilis canceled six publishing projects commissioned to development studios and laid off 15 to 20% of its 65 employees, in addition to voluntary departures. Two members of Nobilis affected by this wave of departures founded the publishing company Zallag at that time.

In early 2011, Nobilis announced a strategic reorientation of its activities, focusing on the distribution of console accessories and the publishing of digital video games accessible via a web browser. The accessory distribution business was profitable: in the 2010–2011 fiscal year, Subsonic generated an annual pre-tax profit of €426,000.

Despite this strategic reorientation, Nobilis was placed in receivership in September 2011. Unable to find a solution for takeover, the company underwent judicial liquidation on 8 March 2013, ceasing its activities. The Subsonic brand, which was generating profitable activity, was preserved by being transformed into a separate company. Arnaud Blacher, Pierre de Laporte, and Eric Pernelle retained management positions within Subsonic after Nobilis' liquidation.

== Published and distributed games ==
According to the database of JeuxVideo.fr, Nobilis would have published and/or distributed a total of 206 video game titles between 2001 and 2010. Some of these games include:

- 2002: Hotel Giant (PC) – Distributor
- 2003: Hearts of Iron (PC) – Distributor
- 2004: Star Academy (PC) – Publisher
- 2004: Sherlock Holmes: The Case of the Silver Earring (PC) – Distributor
- 2005: Caméra Café, le jeu (PC) – Publisher and distributor
- 2005: Wild Water Adrenaline featuring Salomon (PlayStation 2) – Distributor
- 2006: The Secrets of Da Vinci: The Forbidden Manuscript (PC) – Publisher and distributor
- 2006: The Secrets of Atlantis: The Sacred Legacy (PC) – Publisher and distributor
- 2006: Destination: Treasure Island (PC) – Publisher and distributor
- 2007: Napoleon's Campaigns (PC) – Publisher and distributor
- 2007: Mountain Bike Adrenaline featuring Salomon (PlayStation 2) – Publisher and distributor
- 2008: King's Bounty: The Legend – Distributor
- 2008: Moto Racer DS (DS) – Publisher and distributor
- 2008: My Baby Boy and My Baby Girl (DS) – Publisher
- 2009: Case Closed: The Mirapolis Investigation (Wii) – Distributor
- 2009: Crime Scene (DS) – Publisher
- 2010: Killing Floor (PC and Mac OS X) – Distributor
