= Destination: Treasure Island =

2006 video game

- European cover art
- Developer: Kheops Studio
- Publisher: Nobilis
- Designer: Alexia Lang
- Programmers: Wilfried Hinault; Stéphane Petit
- Artist: Franck Letiec
- Writer: Nicolas Hess
- Platforms: Windows, Mac OS X, iOS
- Release: Windows: FRA: November 17, 2006; NA: August 21, 2007; Mac OS X February 24, 2009 iOS; December 9, 2010
- Genre: Adventure
- Mode: Single-player

Destination: Treasure Island is an adventure game developed by Kheops Studio and published by Nobilis.

== Plot ==
=== Characters ===
Jim Hawkings was only a child in Robert Louis Stevenson's 1883 novel, Treasure Island. Four years after the events in the novel, Jim has become a fully grown teenager. Treasure Island ends with Jim returning to England. He uses his share of the treasure to buy his mother a small estate. Jim has become an upstanding adventurous young man, attentive to those around him. His taste for adventure soon sets him on his travels again. With the money remaining, he buys a small boat and leaves England for the West Indies.

Captain Flint is a parrot. Faithful to the memory of its master, Captain Flint helps Jim in his quest and delivers useful information. The parrot shows up in different places on the island, always ready to make a sardonic but humorous comment on the player's actions.

Long John Silver is an acquaintance of Jim, and a colorful character. After he betrayed his fellow pirates, he managed to escape the Royal Guard and flee to a secret island with a good amount of the plunder.

The Pirates in the game are Morgan, Dick, Yellow Dog and others. All these men hate Long John, who was their leader and yet betrayed them to save his own skin. Rescued by a passing ship several years later, they have but one goal in life: find Long John to kill him.

=== Synopsis ===
Four years have passed since the end of the adventure recounted in Robert Louis Stevenson's novel. Jim Hawkins has become an upstanding adventurous young man, attentive to those around him. Imagine his surprise when, one morning, he sees a parrot enter his bedroom window: none other than Captain Flint, Long John's own companion. The bird brings him a message from his master. In the message the old pirate announces that he has buried a marvelous treasure on the secret isle where he retired: Emerald Island. Jim is going to have to hurry though. Pirates, old enemies of Long John, are on his trail.

== Reception ==
Reception

Aggregate score
Aggregator	Score
Metacritic	74/100

Review scores
Publication	Score
Adventure Gamers	4/5
Gamekult	5/10
GameSpot	7.5/10
GameStar	43%
Gamezebo	60/100
GameZone	7.6/10
Jeuxvideo.com	13/20
MeriStation	7.5/10
PC Gamer (US)	78%

The PC version received "mixed or average reviews" according to the review aggregation website Metacritic. GameSpot reviewer Brett Todd didn't think the game was innovative, though he thought it was logical and fun. Jason Flick of Game Chronicles gave particular praise to the game's unique "invention" system.

The PC version was nominated for the "Best Adventure Game" award at GameSpot's Best Games of 2007 Awards, which went to Zack & Wiki: Quest for Barbaros' Treasure.
