= Clusterball =

2000 video game

- British box art
- Developer: Daydream Software
- Publishers: Daydream Software; Strategy First (retail reissue)
- Platforms: Macintosh, Windows
- Release: July 17, 2000; November 20, 2001 (retail reissue)
- Genre: Racing
- Mode: Multiplayer

Clusterball is a 2000 video game featuring futuristic sport gameplay created by the Swedish Company Daydream Software and published by Strategy First, RealNetworks and Daydream Software itself.

Clusterball began development in early 1997 as a research and development experiment at Daydream. It was the company's first fully 3D game, as its other projects were pre-rendered.

== Gameplay ==
In Clusterball, the player must collect as many balls as they can from the playing field.

Clusterball is an action-sports game that plays out in a three-dimensional graphical environment. The player controls a sci-fi aircraft and maneuvers environments based on the Arctic, the Taj Mahal, Stonehenge and other locations.

In Clusterball, the player must collect as many balls as they can from the playing field then fly them through a ring in the center of the stage to collect points. Various weapons and power ups are strewn around the stages, enabling players to steal their opponents' balls or invert the controls of the other player, making movement much more difficult. The balls lie on magnetic ramps and the aircraft must slide on these ramps to collect the balls. As the player tows more and more balls, which create a tail behind the aircraft, the aircraft becomes gradually heavier, therefore more vulnerable to enemy attacks.

The game was designed to enable online multiplayer gameplay.

== Development ==
=== Origins ===
Clusterball began as a research and development experiment at Daydream Software. Initially, it was spearheaded by company co-founder Jörgen Isaksson. The project derived from Daydream's worry, according to the team's Nigel Papworth, that the production pipeline used by its titles Safecracker and Traitors Gate was "too costly and time consuming to be a viable long term solution" for the company. Development began in early 1997. In designing Clusterball, the team sought to create a unique online multiplayer game without violence, as Daydream did not release violent titles. The company told investors in June 1997 that "feasibility study and research" was underway for a game codenamed Project 3, later revealed as Clusterball. A prototype had been created by that time to test the game's technology.

They settled on a combination of sports and flight simulator gameplay, with elements of racing and inspiration from the game Diamond Mine. The design was also driven by a desire among certain Daydream employees for "a game where you could fly around in a landscape and see very far" into the distance, according to the team's Matti Larsson. Clusterball was started concurrently with Traitors Gate and was developed side by side with that game. When asked how the team initially came up with the idea for Clusterball in an interview with Eurogamer, Daydream Software's Nigel Papworth responded with "We sat around and discussed what we thought were the greatest aspects of real life games and computer games, and concluded that ball games rule in real life, flight sims in the digital universe. The conclusion was to build a flight sim ball game!"

=== Release ===
The game was released on July 17, 2000 for both PC computers and as a downloadable title off of Real.com. Plans for a Mac OS X version of the game were announced but later scrapped.

== Reception ==
Reception

Review scores
Publication	Score
Eurogamer	8/10
GameSpot	6.7/10
GameSpy	7.0/10
IGN	6.8/10
PC Zone	4/5

During the 4th Annual Interactive Achievement Awards, Clusterball received a nomination for the "Online Gameplay" award by the Academy of Interactive Arts & Sciences.

== Legacy ==
A sequel to Clusterball called Clusterball Arcade was released for iPhone by Resolution Interactive, a team consisting of ex-Daydream Software members.
