= Kheops Studio =

Defunct video game developer

- Company type: Division (business)
- Industry: Video games
- Founded: September 2003
- Defunct: January 2012
- Fate: Dissolved
- Headquarters: Paris, France
- Products: Adventure games

Kheops Studio was an independent video game development studio created in September 2003. Its games were published by Microids, which acquired the brand and intellectual property as insolvency assets of Cryo Interactive in 2002. The company was co-founded by Benoît Hozjan (of Cryo Interactive), who also served as the creative director for the studio and Stéphane Petit (of Cryo Interactive), who served as technical director. Kheops developed adventure games for the PC platform and released several major successful games. The studio is best known for creating games that have been described by the developer as "cultural entertainment", that is, games which are heavily drawn from historical or literary sources to include a mixture of history and fiction. After filing for bankruptcy, the studio was closed down in January 2012.

== History ==
Kheops Studio was established in Paris during September 2003 by Benoît Hozjan and other ex-members of DreamCatcher Interactive's European branch. DreamCatcher Europe had been founded that January, and was in part composed of the development teams behind Cryo Interactive's Egypt and Atlantis series. According to Hozjan, most who migrated to Kheops were initially employed at DreamCatcher Europe to work on Egypt III; in summer 2003, the publisher had laid off the in-house developers it had carried over from Cryo. After its founding, Kheops sought and received a contract from DreamCatcher to complete Egypt III independently, and it became Kheops' first title.

== Games developed ==
- Jeff Wayne's The War Of The Worlds (1999)
- Egypt III: The Fate of Ramses (2004)
- Crystal Key 2 (co-developed) (2004)
- Return to Mysterious Island (2004)
- Echo: Secrets of the Lost Cavern (2005)
- Voyage: Inspired by Jules Verne (2005)
- The Secrets of Da Vinci: The Forbidden Manuscript (2006)
- Safecracker: The Ultimate Puzzle Adventure (2006)
- Destination: Treasure Island (2006)
- Cleopatra: Riddle of the Tomb (2007)
- Nostradamus: The Last Prophecy (2007)
- Dracula 3: The Path of the Dragon (2008)
- Return to Mysterious Island 2 (2009)
- The Fall Trilogy: Separation (2009)
- The Fall Trilogy 2: Reconstruction (2010)
- The Fall Trilogy 3: Revelation (2011)

== See also ==
- The Adventure Company
