= Strata 3D =

3D modeling software

- Operating system: Linux, macOS, Microsoft Windows
- Type: 3D modeling and animation
- License: Proprietary software
- Website: www.strata.com

Strata Design 3D CX is a commercial 3D modeling, rendering and animation program developed in St. George, Utah by Corastar, Inc. Strata Software is the successor to StrataVision 3D. It is a 3D modeling application for the illustration/multimedia market.

== History ==
Strata 3D was one of the first desktop 3D graphics applications, releasing StrataVision 3D in 1989. The company was formed by brothers Ken and Gary Bringhurst.

In 2016, Strata announced plans to move into augmented reality (AR) and virtual reality (VR), allowing users to view and sell design projects using VR and AR headsets as well as offering custom VR/AR development.

=== Version history ===
- StrataVision was released as the first product of the Strata company in 1988 to facilitate professional 3D graphics on regular desktop Macs. This first release provided high-end modeling and 3D rendering tools.
- StrataVision 2.0 made the Raydiosity rendering algorithm (a variant of radiosity) along with improved modeling features, rendering, basic animation, and extensibility.
- In 1993, Strata StudioPro 1.5 was added to the product line, with StrataVision remaining a reduced-feature "light" version.
- Strata StudioPro 1.75 Blitz in 1996 added support of QuickDraw 3D, multiprocessor support, VRML export, and the Raytracing renderer.
- By 1999, Strata StudioPro 2.53 offered numerous new features, including a choice of QuicDraw 3D or OpenGL for onscreen rendering, multiple viewing options to speed up redraws as well as the ability to convert 3D primitives into skin, Bézier, polygon mesh objects. Other features included texture previews, path extrude, Boolean operations, skin (loft) and extrude; and special effects such as fountains, lens flare, fog, mist.
- In 2002, Strata 3Dbase and Strata 3Dpro (version 3) added functionality such as toon rendering and photon mapping.
- The Strata 3D CX v4.x releases in 2004 included Polygon modeling tools and Subdivision Surface modeling (SDS).
- The Design 3D CX 5.x releases beginning in 2006 included subdivision surfaces (Catmull–Clark algorithm–based polygon smoothing), scripting via the Lua programming language, and rendering to Photoshop layers. This release offered new subdivision tools, scripting support, bones and IK system, and a history palette.
- In 2009, Design 3D CX 6 added HDRI lighting, new grid and guide functionality, multiple polygon editing tools, edit tools for lathe, bezier, extrude, and path extruded objects, new texture channels and controls including Fresnel interpolation, new photon rendering, and rendering quality and speed improvements. Version 6 also added tighter integration with Adobe Photoshop CS4 Extended via a set of plug-ins. Design 3D's Model, TexturePaint, Match and Render plug-ins allowed users to easily send models back and forth from Photoshop to create, edit and texture 3D content.
- The Design 3D CX 7.0 release in 2012 included texture enhancements such as anisotropy and normal map support, blurry transparency and subsets for applying different textures to different groups of polygons in the same object. Also included in 7.0 is a full UV editor, new polygon selection and editing tools, render and speed improvements.
- New features in Design 3D CX 7.5 included UV editing tools such as Conform, (unwrap), seam marking in poly meshes, and new UV edit tools. Modeling enhancements include a Decimate command, new poly editing selection methods and tools, STL (.stl) file import and export for 3D printing, and support for bump/normal maps in Collada import/export.
- Design 3D CX 8.0 added a 64-bit renderer with expanded memory handling and improved handling of very large renderings. Other rendering improvements included a new dialog which added control of gamma, brightness and black point along with the ability to render to High Dynamic Range images (HDRI). Other notable additions were a Publish command for exporting objects to 3D print services including Augment, Sketchfab, and iMaterialise. Lighting improvements include integration with HDR Light Studio.
- Strata Design 3D CX 8.1 added Embree Raycasting from Intel.
