= StrataVision 3D =

Computer graphics software by Strata

- Developer: Strata
- Final release: 5.0 / 1998
- Operating system: Classic Mac OS
- Successor: Strata 3D
- Type: 3D computer graphics
- License: Proprietary
- Website: https://www.strata.com/

StrataVision 3D is a comprehensive 3D computer graphics software package developed by Strata. Features include primitives-based modeling with texturing, keyframe animation, raytrace and later radiosity rendering under the name of Raydiosity.

It is notable for being part of the first wave of 3D graphics in desktop publishing. One particular milestone was rendering the environment in the blockbuster game Myst entirely using StrataVision. The multimedia novel, Sinkha, and the Warner Bros 3D Looney Tunes Project were also created initially using this software.

== History ==
StrataVision was released as the first product of the Strata company in 1989 to facilitate professional 3D graphics on regular desktop Macs. In 1993, StudioPro was added to the product line, with StrataVision remaining a reduced-feature "light" version.

In May 2000, the Strata product lineup was consolidated into Strata 3D which is still developed to this day.

== Features ==
At the time, StrataVision and StrataStudio Pro offered certain features found on dedicated workstations that had not available before on Macintosh.

=== Raydiosity ===
StrataVision 2.0 introduced the Raydiosity rendering algorithm, an algorithm slower than ray tracing, but offering a result deemed more realistic, by taking into account light reflection on textures, atmospheric conditions, inter-reflections between objects, among other things. Raydiosity is often described as Strata's experimental version of radiosity, and at the time was the only implementation of a radiosity-like rendering algorithm available to Macintosh users. It was only found in StrataVision and StrataStudio Pro.

=== RayPainting ===
Another Strata specific rendering, found in StrataStudio Pro, was called RayPainting and applied splotches of colour onto the surface of the object, making it looks like if it were hand painted. Different effects can be applied to simulate the medium used, like, for example, chalk or water color.

=== Extensions ===
StrataVision 2.0 introduced an extension architecture, named SRX, that allowed, for example, to interoperate with Pixar RenderMan or to distribute rendering across computers on the network.

== Reception ==
MacUser in the September 1992 issue gave 4 1/2 mice (out of five) to StrataVision 3D 2.5 praising its excellent rendering quality and advanced texture control despite the slow rendering and the mediocre animation tools.

== Version release history ==
- 5.0 1998
- 4.0: available in 1995. It introduced the ability to perform boolean operations,
- 3.0 1994
- 2.6: ?
- 2.5: available in 1992. It introduced "skin modeling" to wrap a surface around ribs, and "flex object" to make these ribs move or change shape over time. It also allow extruding font shapes.
- 2.0: available in 1991 - introduced the Raydiosity rendering algorithm (not to be confused with radiosity) along with more powerful modelling features, faster rendering, basic animation and extensibility.
- 1.4: 1990
- 1.0: August 1989
