= Photo-referencing =

Visual art technique

Photo-referencing in visual art is the practice of creating art based on a photograph. Art produced through this technique is said to be photo-referenced. The method is widely used by artists, either in their daily work, as part of their training, or to improve their artistic eye.

Photo-referencing, rather than working with live models, is useful for cases in which an artist seeks to realistically produce a work of art based on some subject that is not readily available, such as a specific person who is not available or a structure in another country.

== The Grid Method ==
When an artist's ability to recall images is lacking, photo-referencing is a useful skill and especially useful when the goal is to replicate an image with great detail. Artists may use a lightbox as an aid in photo-referencing. Additionally, the use of the grid-method in photo-referencing has gained popularity due to its straightforward nature. The grid-method begins by drawing a grid on the reference photo, and then copying that grid lightly onto the medium of choice that the drawing will be completed on. By focusing on one block in the grid at a time, artists are able to recreate the image much more precisely.

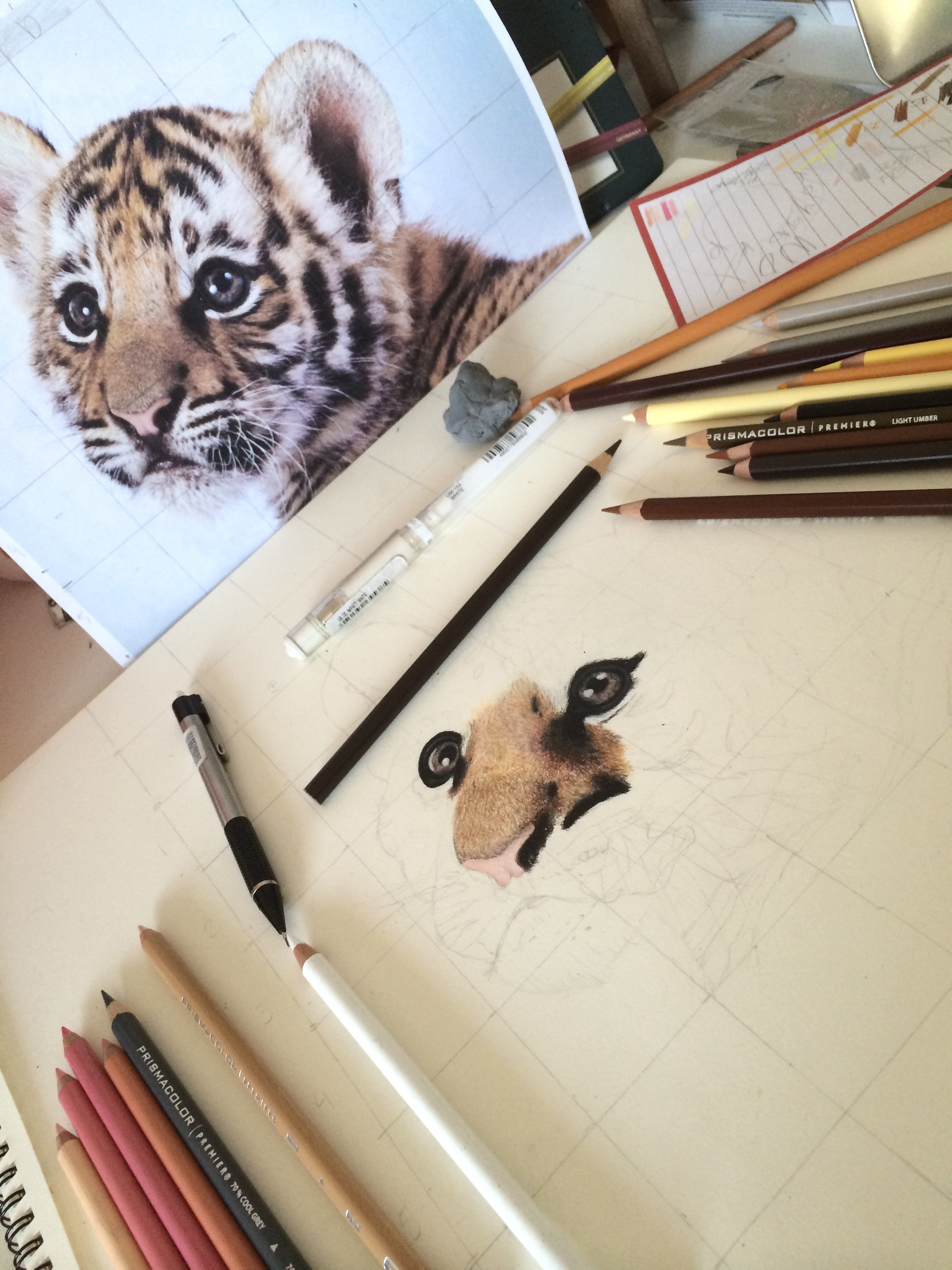
Example of how to use the grid method

Artists choose a reference photo that usually aids in providing direction where creativity is lacking. Reference photos are also helpful for an artist to develop composition and proportionality in their work. Many reference photos are found on websites such as Unsplash or Pixabay. To avoid copyright, either changing the reference in noticeable ways or finding copyright-free photos is key. Some artists prefer to combine multiple reference photos they have collected as a way to aid in adding a unique factor to their finished piece and also a way to avoid copyright.

== Usefulness ==
Although the technique of photo referencing has criticisms, it is a very vital technique used by digital artists when their personal visual memory is lacking. Many artists actually pull from multiple reference photos to create a finished work that wouldn't have been possible without the help of those points of reference. Especially for digital artists, the act of color-picking is particularly helpful for accuracy purposes and is done by using a reference photo.

== Comic Book Industry ==
In the comic book industry, photo-referencing is criticized by some as a technique used to disguise the weakness of the artist's technical capability. Award-winning comic creator Alison Bechdel also uses extensive photo reference, frequently photographing herself in the poses of the characters she draws in order to convey body language accurately.

== Critiques ==
Many artists are criticized for using photo referencing in the creation of their artwork. However, many voices in the art community argue that photo-referencing is a legitimate technique. It is even useful when trying to simply improve skills Artists who have been accused of excessive photo-referencing by their critics include Greg Land and Alex Ross, though others defend the quality of their work.
