= Advance against royalties =

Advance payment made for intellectual property licensing

In the field of intellectual property licensing, an advance against royalties is a payment made by the licensee to the licensor at the start of the period of licensing (usually immediately upon contract, or on delivery of the property being licensed) which is to be offset against future royalty payments. It is also known as a guaranteed minimum royalty payment.

For example, a book's author may sell a license to a publisher in return for 5% royalties on sales of the book and a $5,000 advance against those royalties. In this case, the author would immediately receive the $5,000, and royalty payments would be withheld until $5000 in royalties already paid had been earned — that is, until the publisher's takings from selling copies of the book reached $100,000; after that point the 5% royalty would be paid on any additional sales.

In some business areas (e.g. film production), it is common practice for the licensee to demand repayment of any advance that is not covered by royalties, whereas in others (e.g. book publication) this practice is unusual.

== See also ==
- Advance payment
- Royalties
