= Return to Mysterious Island =

2004 video game

- Developer: Kheops Studio (Note: Mobile versions developed by Tetraedge Games.) (Note: Ported to Mac OS X by Coladia Games.)
- Publisher: The Adventure Company (Note: Windows Mobile and Symbian versions published by Tetraedge Games.) (Note: iOS version published by Chillingo.) (Note: Mac OS X version published by Coladia Games.)
- Director: Desmond Oku
- Designer: Alexia Lang
- Platforms: Windows, Windows Mobile, Symbian, iOS, Mac OS X
- Release: Windows: NA: November 2, 2004; EU: November 19, 2004; TW: August 30, 2005; Windows Mobile: WW: December 12, 2005; Symbian: WW: December 7, 2006; iOS: WW: May 27, 2009; Mac OS X: NA: June 23, 2009
- Genre: Adventure
- Mode: Single-player

Return to Mysterious Island is a 2004 graphic adventure game developed by Kheops Studio and published by The Adventure Company. Based on Jules Verne's 1875 novel The Mysterious Island, the game casts the player as Mina, a shipwrecked woman forced to survive on an uncharted island.

== Gameplay ==
Players explore the world by clicking on different areas to move and to interact with items. Players also have an inventory, in which they can collect and store items and construct new ones.

== Plot ==
Return to Mysterious Island follows Mina, a strong young woman alone on a round-the-world sailing expedition. Caught in a tremendous storm, she becomes stranded on the shores of a wild and apparently uninhabited island. As she explores her new surroundings, she uncovers artifacts, living spaces and technologies left behind by the people who came before her to this uncharted island.

Creating a new life, Mina builds a home from the remains of the previous settlements and uses her survival skills against the wilds of the jungle. She soon becomes aware of a figure in the shadows who, seemingly aware of her troubles, offers her assistance. She eventually identifies this figure as the unsettled ghost of Captain Nemo, whose body is located in a cave on the island. Piecing together the hints and clues he provides, Mina must retrieve his body and give him a proper burial in order to free his tortured soul, and then travel to the Nautilus deep below the island shore to unlock a way to escape the island.

== Development ==
Return to Mysterious Island was conceived by Kheops Studio because Mystery of the Nautilus had been a success for publisher DreamCatcher Interactive, selling 117,000 units globally by 2004.

== Reception ==
Reception

Review scores
Publication	Score
Computer Gaming World	4/5
Computer Games Magazine	4/5

According to the NPD Group, Return to Mysterious Island sold 21,700 copies at a list price $19.99 by June 2005. It became Kheops Studio's biggest hit worldwide, which company head Benoît Hozjan attributed to word of mouth. The game's later iPhone release sold 100,000 copies by November 2009. Review aggregation website Metacritic reported critical reception of Return to Mysterious Island's original computer release as "generally positive", based on 19 reviews.

The game 4 out of 5 from Modojo for its iPhone version; the reviewer said that the game have remarkable visuals and audio as well as manageable inventory system but have frustrating puzzles. Geek.com liked the game but also compared it to Myst.

Return to Mysterious Island was nominated as SME's pick for the best adventure game of 2004, but lost the prize to Syberia II. In 2011, Adventure Gamers named Return to Mysterious Island the 53rd-best adventure game ever released.

== Legacy ==
A sequel, Return to Mysterious Island II, developed by Kheops Studio and published by Microïds, was released for PC and Apple iPhone on August 14, 2009.

Coladia, founded in 2005, teamed up with Kheops Studio to update and port Mysterious Island and other Kheops adventure games to macOS and iOS. A port of the game to Apple's iPhone was released on the iTunes app store on June 15, 2009.
