= Voyage: Inspired by Jules Verne =

2005 video game

- Developers: Kheops Studio (PC); Microids (Mac OS X, iOS)
- Publishers: The Adventure Company (PC); Microids (Mac OS X, iOS)
- Designer: Alexis Lang
- Platforms: Windows, Mac OS X, iOS
- Release: Windows: NA: 16 August 2005; FRA: 30 September 2005; UK: 3 March 2006; Mac OS X 9 November 2011 iOS; 2 November 2012
- Genre: Adventure
- Mode: Single-player

Ardan jumps across the surface of the Moon in a minigame

Voyage: Inspired by Jules Verne (known as Journey to the Moon in the United Kingdom and Australia) is a point-and-click adventure game with pre-rendered graphics, developed by Kheops Studio and published by The Adventure Company for the PC in 2005. The game's story focuses on a French adventurer's journey to the Moon in the 19th century, and the ancient lunar civilization he subsequently finds.

Voyage is loosely based on the novels From the Earth to the Moon (1865) and Around the Moon (1870) by French science fiction author Jules Verne, and the 1901 novel The First Men in the Moon by English science fiction author H. G. Wells. Reactions to the game were mixed. In particular, some reviewers praised it for immersing the player in the look and feel of the 19th century; others have criticized it for featuring dated graphics and dull textures.

While staying true to most adventure game conventions, Voyage has some unique features for its genre. These include two dexterity minigames which take advantage of the reduced gravity in the game's lunar setting, and an "Intelligence Management System", in which a score is assigned to the player for every puzzle they solve, and for certain actions. The Adventure Company introduced this feature to motivate players to replay the game to increase their cumulative score.

The game was later ported and published by Microids for Mac OS X in 2011, and for iOS in 2012 under the name Jules Verne's Journey to the Center of the Moon.

== Gameplay ==
The main focus of Voyage is puzzle-solving. The player can move by clicking, and can swivel the camera 360 degrees. There are several types of puzzle in Voyage including those involving native plant life on the Moon, mechanical puzzles, audio puzzles, and mathematical puzzles. Many of these puzzles require the player to decipher and use the native language of the Moon's inhabitants.

Voyage features two unique dexterity minigames. Using a low-gravity setting, the first minigame requires the player to collect floating bubbles in a can, and the second requires the player to execute large jumps across the surface of the Moon. These two minigames form only a minor part of the game. The game also has several timed sequences requiring the player to complete puzzles under a time limit. The consequence of failing a puzzle of this sort is death, after which the player is able to return and replay the puzzle. Players can also be killed as the result of taking incorrect actions related to the game's story.

A critical aspect of gameplay in Voyage is the inventory system, which allows the player to pick up and keep dozens of different items. However, the maximum quantity of a given item that the player may keep in his inventory at any one time is three. One of the main uses of the inventory is to combine items together to make new items. This process of breaking and reforming items in the inventory comprises a large portion of the puzzle aspect of the game. The inventory can also be used to create meals which the player can consume; this ability plays a major role in several puzzles. Another use of the inventory is to create hybrid lunar plants, which play a critical role in the earlier puzzles of the game.

=== Intelligence Management System ===
The "Intelligence Management System" featured in Voyage is a score assigned to the player by the Selenites, the natives of the Moon. For each puzzle the player solves, and for certain actions, this score is increased, and the Selenites treat the player with more respect. During an interview with GamersInfo, Benoît Hozjan, managing director and co-founder of Kheops Studio, described the system, saying:

For Voyage, you have the universe famous 'lunar IQ'. For instance, during a quiz, players who answer randomly should have fewer points, the players will be not restricted but it will take much more time to progress... The player will have different ways to enter a new room. Sometimes the clues are very subtle but almost each time there are 2 or 3 clues to solve a challenge and a higher IQ may help you!

In the same interview, Alexis Lang, lead game designer at Kheops, commented that "a low score does not mean that you are stupid in any way, it just means that some pompous and bombastic lunar people think that your character is dumb!" This reflects the fact that the "Intelligence Management System" is designed primarily to earn the respect of the Selenites, but Hozjan also said that the players can try to increase their score and share their experience through forums. The Adventure Company has marketed the system as bringing a degree of replay value to Voyage, as players can replay the game in attempts to achieve a higher score.

== Synopsis ==
=== Setting ===
Voyage is set in 1865. President Barbicane of the "Gun Club" decides to build an enormous cannon in Baltimore to shoot a shell, capable of supporting human life, towards the Moon in the hopes of a successful landing. Voyage's protagonist, Michel Ardan, volunteers to travel in the aluminium shell. After the game's brief introduction in the shell, Ardan lands on the Moon and discovers the Selenites, as well as a complex ecosystem of lunar plants. The main accessible areas in the game are the Moon's surface, and the underground Selenite civilization.

The Selenites are the subterranean inhabitants of the Moon, and are a highly intelligent society maintained by hierarchy and secret. They possess blue skin, large black eyes and transparent cerebral lobes on the sides of their heads. This is in fact a reference to H. G. Wells' 1901 novel The First Men in the Moon, as the adventurers never actually land on the Moon in Verne's original story.

The Selenites are divided into castes. They live in a large complex under the surface of the Moon from which they rarely venture, with the exception of the "exiles". The Selenites "banish [these] dregs of their society, the criminals and psychotics," to the surface of the Moon. There are three Selenite exiles with whom the player can interact; they live on the surface and sleep in their isolated underground stables at night. Each exile has two different plants on either shoulder with which they share a special bond.

=== Characters ===
The player character is Michel Ardan, an eccentric and intrepid French scientist who is enthusiastic, daring and cheerful. President Barbicane, the President of the Gun Club, and Captain Nicholl, an engineer, are both found dead at the start of the game, not having survived the flight to the Moon. A woman called Diana features in the game's backstory, as a woman whose ancestors made contact with the Selenites. Apart from these human characters, there are also several Selenite characters such as the Supreme Moon Ruler, the High Dignitary, Scurvy, Scruple, and the three exiles.

=== Plot ===
Voyage begins as Ardan awakes in the shell and discovers that his two companions, Barbicane and Nicholl, are dead. The first part of the game consists of Ardan investigating the shell, trying to regain his memory of what happened, and how Barbicane and Nicholl died. He will also encounter other problems, most notably when his oxygen supply is low and needs to be remedied. Eventually Ardan's journey will carry him into orbit around the Moon in which he must prepare himself for a lunar landing.

Once Ardan successfully lands the shell on the Moon, he must solve a series of puzzles on the surface in order to gain access to the hidden civilization below. There he encounters the Selenite race. Following this, Ardan focuses on finding a way to leave the Moon and report his findings to Earth. After acquiring what he needs, Ardan travels back to Earth in the shell. He lands in the ocean and manages to swim to a nearby island, where he meets another famous Jules Verne character, Captain Nemo.

== Development ==
Journey to the Center of the Moon was announced for the PC at E3 2005. The Adventure Company collaborated with developers Kheops Studios for the release. Benoît Hozjan, the co-founder of Kheops Studio, became Managing Director of the game, while Alexis Lang became the Lead Game Designer.

Journey to the Center of the Moon was later renamed Voyage: Inspired by Jules Verne. Benoît Hozjan explained the change, saying that Journey to the Center of the Moon was confusing for some people and thought to be the sequel to Journey to the Center of the Earth, another Verne-inspired PC game, and marketing decided to change it. The name was changed on 7 July, a few months after the game's announcement.

Benoît Hozjan explained Kheops Studio's choice of Jules Verne's work as a basis for Voyage. According to Hozjan, Jules Verne's novels provide the two core elements of adventure games: dreams and challenges. The characters are ordinary men engaged in concrete challenges that are an inspiration for puzzles. He further went on to say that the game is influenced by Verne's From the Earth to the Moon, which documents the lead up to the lunar trip, but draws more heavily from the sequel Around the Moon, which recounts the actual voyage. The main difference, Hozjan said, was that in the novel the protagonists fail to reach the Moon, whereas in Voyage the trip is a success. Additionally, Alexis Lang attributed the inspiration for the Selenites to H.G. Wells' The First Men in the Moon. Alexis commented that Wells pictured a very ancient Selenite civilisation horrified at human roughness, and that Wells was more misanthropist than Verne. The developers added a touch of irony in their story and chose an optimistic and joyful main character.

The Adventure Company released the Voyage demo in August 2005. The demo included the game's introduction in the shell. Voyage, originally slated for a 27 September release, was shipped to stores ahead of schedule on 16 August of the same year.

== Reception ==
Reception

Aggregate score
Aggregator	Score
Metacritic	71/100

Review scores
Publication	Score
4Players	68%
Adventure Gamers	4/5
Gamekult	5/10
GameSpot	6/10
GameStar	59%
Gamezebo	60/100
GameZone	6.8/10
Jeuxvideo.com	13/20
PC Format	57%
X-Play	3/5

The Windows version received "mixed or average reviews" according to the review aggregation website Metacritic.

One of the more positively received aspects of the game was its ability to recreate the mood of 19th century science-fiction, with GameSpot writing that the game nicely re-creates the whimsical mood of 19th-century sci-fi and a sense of wonder In contrast, Game Over Online said that once the player leaves the capsule and arrives on the moon, instead of viewing colorful and wondrous sights, the game turns into a drab and unlikely bore. The puzzle aspect of Voyage met with mixed responses. On the other hand, GameSpot accused the puzzle aspects of Voyage of reducing Jules Verne's tale of a visit to the moon in 1865 to a series of clumsily arranged logic puzzles geared to try the patience of adventure-game veterans. The puzzles in the game are often extremely difficult, with Just Adventure attributing the unexpected difficulty in the game to the fact that there are often several different ways to achieve the same goals, thanks to the game's "Intelligence Management System". The game's inventory system received praise from GamersInfo as being very well done.

In terms of graphics, Voyage was poorly received, with the graphics being described by GameZone as containing some vibrant colors, but lacking the lush, spectacular view that has been seen in countless other adventure games. Voyage had also been criticized for its lack of story and over-reliance on back story. The game's music was generally appreciated, with Jolt describing the music as having a nice retro-futuristic feel which sets the mood perfectly. X-Play commented on the game's voice acting as overly dramatic but appropriate, but criticized many of the sound effects as being cheesy. GameSpot described Ardan's dialogue as somewhat lame, and also criticized the game's sound effects.
