= List of graphic adventure games =

== 1980s ==
Notable graphic adventure games of the 1980s
| Game | Developer | Publisher | System | Date released | Notes | Game engine |
|---|---|---|---|---|---|---|
| Mystery House | On-Line Systems | On-Line Systems | Apple II | 5 May 1980 | First graphic adventure game, featuring black and white visuals. | ADL (Adventure Development Language) |
| Wizard and the Princess | On-Line Systems | On-Line Systems | Apple II, Apple II Plus, Atari 8-bit, Commodore 64, IBM PC, PCjr, FM-7, PC-88, PC-98 | August 1980 | | ADL (Adventure Development Language) |
| Mission Asteroid | On-Line Systems | On-Line Systems | Apple II, Atari 8-bit, Commodore 64 | 1980 | | ADL (Adventure Development Language) |
| Cranston Manor | On-Line Systems | On-Line Systems | Apple II, FM-7, PC-88, PC-98 | 1981 | | ADL (Adventure Development Language) |
| The Demon's Forge | Brian Fargo | Saber Software | Apple II, IBM PC | 1981 | | Unknown (possibly ADL engine from Mystery House) |
| Ulysses and the Golden Fleece | On-Line Systems | On-Line Systems | Apple II, Atari 8-bit, Commodore 64, MS-DOS | 1981 | | ADL (Adventure Development Language) |
| Adventureland (re-release) | Adventure International | Adventure International | Apple II | 1982 | The graphic version of a 1978 text adventure game | [proprietary engine] |
| The Sands of Egypt | Datasoft | Datasoft | Apple II, Atari 8-bit | 1982 | | Datasoft Engine |
| Time Zone | On-Line Systems | On-Line Systems | Apple II | 1982 | | ADL (Adventure Development Language) |
| Transylvania | Penguin Software | Penguin Software | Apple II, Atari 8-bit, Commodore 64, FM-7, Macintosh, PC-88, PC-98 | 1982 | | Graphics Magician |
| Kabul Spy | Sirius Software | Sirius Software | Apple II | 16 February 1982 | | [proprietary engine] |
| The Dark Crystal | On-Line Systems | On-Line Systems | Apple II, Atari 8-bit | 1983 | | ADL (Adventure Development Language) |
| Star Arthur Legend I: Planet Mephius | T&E Soft | T&E Soft, JVC | FM-7, MSX | 1983 | | [proprietary engine] |
| The Portopia Serial Murder Case | Yuji Horii, Chunsoft | Enix, Square Enix | NEC PC-6001, MSX, Sharp X1, Family Computer, Mobile (i-mode, EZweb, Keitai) | June 1983 | | [proprietary engine] |
| Dezeni Land | Hudson Soft | Hudson Soft | FM-7, MSX, MZ-1500, PC-6001, PC-8001, PC-8801, PC-9801, Sharp X1 | October 1983 | | |
| Below the Root | Dale Disharoon | Windham Classics | MS-DOS, Commodore 64, Apple II, MSX | 1984 | | [proprietary engine] |
| The Black Sanctum | Mark Data Products | Mark Data Products | TRS-80, MS-DOS | 1984 | Graphical update of the 1981 original | |
| The Dallas Quest | Datasoft | Datasoft | Commodore 64, Apple IIe, Atari 8-bit, TRS-80 Color Computer | 1984 | | Datasoft Engine |
| Okhotsk ni Kiyu: Hokkaido Rensa Satsujin Jiken | Yuji Horii, Login Software | ASCII, Enix | NEC PC-6001, PC-88, MSX, Family Computer, PC-98 | 1984 | Spiritual successor to The Portopia Serial Murder Case | [proprietary engine] |
| Rendezvous with Rama | Telarium | Telarium | MS-DOS, Commodore 64, Apple II | 1984 | | Spinnaker Adventure Language |
| Thayer's Quest | Virtual Image Productions | Interplay | 3DO, Arcade, CD-i, MS-DOS, DVD player, LaserDisc, Mac OS, Windows | 1984 | Also known as Kingdom: The Far Reaches | |
| King's Quest: Quest for the Crown | Sierra On-Line | Sierra On-Line | PCjr, Tandy 1000, Amiga, Apple II, Apple IIGS, Atari ST, Macintosh, MS-DOS, Master System | 10 May 1984 | | Adventure Game Interpreter (AGI) |
| Princess Tomato in the Salad Kingdom | Hudson Soft | Hudson Soft | PC-88, NEC PC-6001, FM-7, MSX, NES/Famicom | July 1984 | | [proprietary engine] |
| The Death Trap | Square | Square | PC-88, PC-98, Fujitsu FM-7 | October 1984 | | [proprietary engine] |
| Wingman | TamTam | Enix | PC-88, FM-7 | November 1984 | | [unknown] |
| Time Tunnel | Applied Systems Engineering | U.S. Gold | Commodore 64 | 1985 | | |
| Karuizawa Yūkai Annai | | Enix | PC-88, FM-7, Sharp X1, PC-6001, MSX | May 1985 | | |
| Tenshitachi no Gogo | JAST | JAST | PC-88, MSX | May 1985 | | [unknown] |
| King's Quest II: Romancing the Throne | Sierra On-Line | Sierra On-Line | MS-DOS, Macintosh, Apple II, Apple IIGS, Amiga, Atari ST, PCjr | June 1985 | | Adventure Game Interpreter (AGI) |
| The Crimson Crown - Further Adventures in Transylvania | Penguin Software | Penguin Software | Amiga, Apple II, Atari ST, Commodore 64, MS-DOS, FM-7, Macintosh, PC-88, PC-98 | October 1985 | | Graphics Magician |
| Déjà Vu: A Nightmare Comes True | ICOM Simulations | Mindscape, Kemco | Apple IIGS, Macintosh, Atari ST, Commodore 64, Amiga, MS-DOS, Game Boy Color, Windows, NES | October 1985 | | MacVenture |
| Perry Mason: The Case of the Mandarin Murder | Telarium | Audiogenic Software | Amiga, Commodore 64, Apple II, MS-DOS, MSX | November 1985 | | Spinnaker Adventure Language |
| The Black Cauldron | Sierra On-Line | Sierra On-Line | Amiga, Apple II, Apple IIGS, Atari ST, IBM PC | 1986 | | Adventure Game Interpreter (AGI) |
| Labyrinth: The Computer Game | Lucasfilm Games | Activision | Apple IIe and IIc, Commodore 64/128, MSX2 | 1986 | | LucasArts in-house engine |
| Murder on the Mississippi | Activision | Activision | Apple II, Commodore 64/128, MSX2, Family Computer, Atari 800/XE/XL | 1986 | | [proprietary engine] |
| The Scoop | Telarium | Telarium, Spinnaker Software | Apple II, MS-DOS | 1986 | DOS version released in 1989 | [unknown] |
| Tass Times in Tonetown | Interplay Productions, Brainwave Creations | Activision | Atari ST, Amiga, Apple II, Apple IIGS, Commodore 64, MS-DOS, Macintosh | 1986 | | [proprietary engine] |
| Uninvited | ICOM Simulations | Mindscape, Kemco | Apple IIGS, Macintosh, Atari ST, Commodore 64, Amiga, NES, MS-DOS, Windows, Windows Mobile | 1986 | | MacVenture |
| Alpha | Square | Square | PC-88, PC-98, Fujitsu FM-7, Sharp X1 | 8 July 1986 | | [proprietary engine] |
| J.B. Harold Murder Club | Riverhillsoft | Riverhillsoft, Micro Cabin, Broderbund, Hudson Soft, FonFun | PC-98, MSX, TurboGrafx-CD, MS-DOS, Nintendo DS, iOS | August 1986 | | [proprietary engine] |
| Space Quest: The Sarien Encounter | Sierra On-Line | Sierra On-Line | MS-DOS, Macintosh, Apple II, Apple IIGS, Amiga, Atari ST | October 1986 | | Adventure Game Interpreter (AGI) |
| King's Quest III: To Heir Is Human | Sierra On-Line | Sierra On-Line | MS-DOS, Apple II, Apple IIGS, Amiga, Atari ST, Mac, Tandy Color Computer 3 | 1 October 1986 | | Adventure Game Interpreter (AGI) |
| Dead Zone | Sunsoft | Sunsoft | Famicom Disk System | 20 November 1986 | | [proprietary engine] |
| Suishō no Dragon | Square | Square | Famicom Disk System | 15 December 1986 | | [proprietary engine] |
| La Abadía del Crimen (The Abbey of Crime) | Opera Soft | | Amstrad CPC, MSX, PC, ZX Spectrum | 1987 | | [unknown] |
| The Faery Tale Adventure | MicroIllusions | MicroIllusions | Amiga, Commodore 64, MS-DOS, Genesis | 1987 | | [proprietary engine] |
| Mortville Manor | Lankhor | Lankhor | Amiga, Atari ST, Amstrad CPC, Sinclair QL, MS-DOS | 1987 | | Mortevielle |
| Police Quest: In Pursuit of the Death Angel | Sierra On-Line | Sierra On-Line | MS-DOS, Amiga, Atari ST, Apple II, Apple IIGS | 1987 | | Adventure Game Interpreter (AGI) |
| Jesus | Enix | Enix | PC-88, FM-7, MSX2, X1, Famicom | 28 April 1987 | | [proprietary engine] |
| Leisure Suit Larry in the Land of the Lounge Lizards | Sierra On-Line | Sierra On-Line | MS-DOS, Amiga, Apple II, Atari ST, Apple IIGS, TRS-80, Windows, OS X, Xbox Live Arcade, PlayStation Network, iOS, Android | 5 July 1987 | | Adventure Game Interpreter (AGI) |
| Shadowgate | ICOM Simulations | Mindscape, Kemco | Apple IIGS, Atari ST, Amiga, CD-i, Game Boy Color, Apple Macintosh, Nintendo Entertainment System, Palm OS, MS-DOS, Pocket PC (ARM, MIPS), Mobile Phone | 30 July 1987 | | MacVenture |
| Maniac Mansion | Lucasfilm Games | Lucasfilm Games | Commodore 64, Apple II, IBM PC, Amiga, Atari ST, Nintendo Entertainment System | 5 October 1987 | | SCUMM |
| Space Quest II: Vohaul's Revenge | Sierra On-Line | Sierra On-Line | MS-DOS, Macintosh, Apple II, Apple IIGS, Amiga, Atari ST | 14 November 1987 | | Adventure Game Interpreter (AGI) |
| Méwilo | Coktel Vision | Coktel Vision | MS-DOS, Amiga, Atari ST, Amstrad CPC | 28 November 1987 | | [unknown] |
| Captain Blood | Exxos (ERE Informatique) | Infogrames | Atari ST, Amiga, Apple IIGS, IBM PC, Amstrad CPC, Commodore 64, ZX Spectrum, Thomson TO7, Macintosh | 1988 | | |
| Déjà Vu II: Lost in Las Vegas | ICOM Simulations | Mindscape | Apple IIGS, Macintosh; Atari ST, CD-i, Amiga, Game Boy Color, MS-DOS, Pocket PC | 1988 | | MacVenture |
| Famicom Detective Club: The Missing Heir | Nintendo R&D1, Tose (original); Mages (Switch) | Nintendo | Family Computer Disk System, Super Famicom, Game Boy Advance, Nintendo Switch | 1988 | | Nintendo proprietary engine |
| Gold Rush! | Sierra On-Line | Sierra On-Line | MS-DOS, Amiga, Atari ST, Macintosh, Apple II, Apple IIGS | 1988 | | Adventure Game Interpreter (AGI) |
| Manhunter: New York | Evryware | Sierra On-Line | MS-DOS, Amiga, Atari ST, Apple IIGS, Tandy 1000 | 1988 | | Adventure Game Interpreter (AGI) |
| Neuromancer | Interplay Productions | Mediagenic | Amiga, Apple II, Apple IIGS, Commodore 64, MS-DOS | 1988 | | Interplay Productions proprietary engine |
| Ripple Island | Sunsoft | Sunsoft | Famicom, PlayStation, Mobile phone | 23 January 1988 | | [unknown] |
| Hoshi wo Sagashite... | Sega | Sega | Master System | 2 April 1988 | Also known as Searching the Stars: The Story of Mio | Sega proprietary engine |
| King's Quest IV: The Perils of Rosella | Sierra On-Line | Sierra On-Line | MS-DOS, Amiga, Apple IIGS, Atari ST | September 1988 | | Adventure Game Interpreter (AGI) or Sierra's Creative Interpreter (SCI) |
| Leisure Suit Larry Goes Looking for Love (in Several Wrong Places) | Sierra On-Line | Sierra On-Line | MS-DOS, Amiga, Atari ST | October 1988 | | Sierra's Creative Interpreter (SCI) |
| Zak McKracken and the Alien Mindbenders | Lucasfilm Games | Lucasfilm Games | Amiga, Atari ST, Commodore 64, MS-DOS, FM Towns | October 1988 | | SCUMM |
| Police Quest II: The Vengeance | Sierra On-Line | Sierra On-Line | MS-DOS, Amiga, Atari ST, PC-98 | November 1988 | | Sierra's Creative Interpreter (SCI) |
| Snatcher | Konami | Konami | NEC PC-8801mkIISR, MSX2, PC Engine Super CD-ROM², Sega CD, PlayStation, Saturn | 26 November 1988 | Incomplete story in versions prior to 1992 | Konami proprietary engine |
| Akira | TOSE | Taito | Famicom | 24 December 1988 | | TOSE proprietary engine |
| B.A.T. | Computer's Dream | Ubisoft | Amiga, Amstrad CPC, Atari ST, Commodore 64, MS-DOS | 1989 | | |
| Emmanuelle | Coktel Vision | Tomahawk, Coktel Vision | MS-DOS, Amiga, Atari ST | 1989 | | |
| Famicom Detective Club: The Girl Who Stands Behind | Nintendo R&D1, Tose (original); Mages (Switch) | Nintendo | Family Computer Disk System, Super Famicom, Game Boy Advance, Nintendo Switch | 1989 | | |
| Future Wars | Delphine Software International | Delphine Software International | MS-DOS, Amiga, Atari ST | 1989 | | Cinematique Evo1 |
| KULT: The Temple of Flying Saucers | Exxos, ERE informatique | Infogrames, Data East Corporation (US) | Amiga, Atari ST, MS-DOS | 1989 | Also known as Chamber of the Sci-Mutant Priestess | Kult |
| Legend of Djel | Coktel Vision | Tomahawk, Coktel Vision | MS-DOS, Amiga, Atari ST | 1989 | | [unknown] |
| Manhunter 2: San Francisco | Evryware | Sierra On-Line | MS-DOS, Amiga, Atari ST, Mac OS | 1989 | | Adventure Game Interpreter (AGI) |
| Mean Streets | Access Software | Access Software | MS-DOS, Amiga, Atari ST, Commodore 64 | 1989 | Part of the Tex Murphy series. First adventure game in 256 colors. | Unknown (the flight sections use Echelon's game engine). |
| Transylvania III: Vanquish the Night | Polarware | Polarware | Apple IIGS, MS-DOS | 1989 | | [unknown] |
| Space Quest III: The Pirates of Pestulon | Sierra On-Line | Sierra On-Line | MS-DOS, Macintosh, Amiga, Atari ST | 24 March 1989 | | Sierra's Creative Interpreter (SCI) |
| Indiana Jones and the Last Crusade | Lucasfilm Games | Lucasfilm Games | MS-DOS, Amiga, Atari ST, Macintosh, FM Towns, CDTV | July 1989 | | SCUMM |
| Idol Hakkenden | Natsume | Towa Chiki | Famicom | 14 September 1989 | | Natsume proprietary engine |
| The Colonel's Bequest | Sierra On-Line | Sierra On-Line | Amiga, Atari ST, MS-DOS | October 1989 | | Sierra's Creative Interpreter (SCI) |
| Quest for Glory: So You Want to Be a Hero | Sierra On-Line | Sierra On-Line | MS-DOS, Amiga, Macintosh, PC-98, Atari ST | October 1989 | Originally titled Hero's Quest: So You Want to Be a Hero | Sierra's Creative Interpreter (SCI) |
| Codename: ICEMAN | Sierra On-Line | Sierra On-Line | MS-DOS, Amiga, Atari ST, Apple Macintosh | November 1989 | | Sierra's Creative Interpreter (SCI) |
| Leisure Suit Larry III: Passionate Patti in Pursuit of the Pulsating Pectorals | Sierra On-Line | Sierra On-Line | MS-DOS, Amiga, Atari ST | November 1989 | | Sierra's Creative Interpreter (SCI) |

== 1990s ==
Notable graphic adventure games of the 1990s
| Game | Developer | Publisher | System | Date released | Notes | Game engine |
|---|---|---|---|---|---|---|
| Altered Destiny | Accolade | Accolade | MS-DOS, Amiga | 1990 | | Adventure Programming Engine |
| Black Sect | Lankhor | Lankhor | Amstrad CPC, Atari ST, Amiga, MS-DOS, Thomson TO8 | 1990 | | |
| Countdown | Access Software | Access Software | MS-DOS | 1990 | | Access |
| Earthrise: A Guild Investigation | Matt Gruson | Interstel | MS-DOS | 1990 | | |
| The Final Battle | Silicon Software | Personal Software Services / Mirrorsoft | Atari ST, Amiga, MS-DOS | 1990 | | |
| Geisha | Coktel Vision | Tomahawk, Coktel Vision | MS-DOS, Amiga, Atari ST | 1990 | | Gob |
| Hugo's House of Horrors | Gray Design Associates | Gray Design Associates | MS-DOS, Windows | 1990 | | Hugo |
| Les Manley in: Search for the King | Accolade | Accolade, Ziggurat Interactive | Amiga, MS-DOS | 1990 | | Adventure Programming Engine |
| Maupiti Island | Lankhor | Lankhor | Amiga, Atari ST, MS-DOS | 1990 | | |
| Operation Stealth | Delphine Software International | Interplay Entertainment, U.S. Gold | Amiga, Atari ST, MS-DOS | 1990 | | |
| Quest for Glory II: Trial by Fire | Sierra On-Line | Sierra On-Line | Amiga, MS-DOS | 1990 | | Sierra's Creative Interpreter (SCI) |
| Rise of the Dragon | Dynamix | Sierra On-Line | Amiga, MS-DOS, Macintosh, Mega-CD | 1990 | | |
| Conquests of Camelot: The Search for the Grail | Sierra On-Line | Sierra On-Line | Amiga, Atari ST, MS-DOS | January 1990 | | Sierra's Creative Interpreter (SCI) |
| Loom | Lucasfilm Games | Lucasfilm Games | MS-DOS, Mac OS, Amiga, Atari ST, FM Towns, TurboGrafx-16, Steam | January 1990 | | SCUMM |
| Elvira: Mistress of the Dark | Horrorsoft | Accolade | MS-DOS, Amiga, Atari ST, Commodore 64 | March 1990 | | |
| The Secret of Monkey Island | Lucasfilm Games | Lucasfilm Games | Original version Amiga, Atari ST, CDTV, MS-DOS, FM Towns, Mac OS, Sega CD; Special edition iOS, OS X, Windows, PlayStation Network, Xbox Live | October 1990 | Special edition released in 2009 | SCUMM |
| Spellcasting 101: Sorcerers Get All the Girls | Legend Entertainment | Legend Entertainment | MS-DOS | October 1990 | | |
| King's Quest V: Absence Makes the Heart Go Yonder! | Sierra On-Line | Sierra On-Line | MS-DOS, Windows, NES, Mac OS, Amiga, FM Towns, PC-98 | 9 November 1990 | | Sierra's Creative Interpreter (SCI) |
| The Adventures of Willy Beamish | Dynamix | Sierra On-Line | Amiga, MS-DOS, Macintosh, Sega CD | 1991 | | |
| Alice: An Interactive Museum | Toshiba-EMI | Synergy | Mac OS, Windows | 1991 | | |
| Castle of Dr. Brain | Sierra On-Line | Sierra On-Line | Amiga, MS-DOS, Mac OS, NEC PC-9801 | 1991 | | |
| Conquests of the Longbow: The Legend of Robin Hood | Sierra On-Line | Sierra On-Line | MS-DOS, Amiga | 1991 | | Sierra's Creative Interpreter (SCI) |
| Cruise for a Corpse | Delphine Software International | Erbe Software, Interplay Entertainment, U.S. Gold | Amiga, Atari ST, MS-DOS | 1991 | | |
| EcoQuest: The Search for Cetus | Sierra On-Line | Sierra On-Line | MS-DOS | 1991 | | Sierra's Creative Interpreter (SCI) |
| Elvira II: The Jaws of Cerberus | Horrorsoft | Accolade | MS-DOS, Amiga, Atari ST, Commodore 64 | 1991 | | |
| Fascination | Coktel Vision | Tomahawk, Coktel Vision | MS-DOS, Amiga, Atari ST | 1991 | | |
| Gobliiins | Coktel Vision | Tomahawk | Amiga, Atari ST, MS-DOS, iPhone, Macintosh | 1991 | | |
| Heart of China | Dynamix | Sierra On-Line | Amiga, MS-DOS, Macintosh | 1991 | | |
| Hugo II, Whodunit? | Gray Design Associates | Gray Design Associates | MS-DOS, Windows | 1991 | | |
| Les Manley in: Lost in L.A. | Accolade | Accolade, Ziggurat Interactive | MS-DOS | 1991 | | |
| Martian Memorandum | Access Software | Access Software | MS-DOS | 1991 | Part of the Tex Murphy series | |
| Mikeneko Homuzu no Kishido | | Ask Kodansha | Game Boy | 15 February 1991 | First adventure game on the Game Boy | |
| Nostalgia 1907 | Sur de Wave | Sur de Wave | X68000, Mega-CD, PC-98, FM Towns Marty | 1991 | | |
| Police Quest III: The Kindred | Sierra On-Line | Sierra On-Line | MS-DOS, Amiga | 1991 | | Sierra's Creative Interpreter (SCI) |
| Sherlock Holmes: Consulting Detective | ICOM Simulations | ICOM Simulations | MS-DOS, Mac OS, CDTV, TurboGrafx-CD, Sega CD, DVD, iPad, Windows, OS X | 1991 | | |
| The Space Adventure – Cobra: The Legendary Bandit | Hudson Soft | Hudson Soft | PC Engine CD, Sega CD | 1991 | Sequel to Japan-only 1989 game Cobra: Kokuryuuou no Densetsu | |
| Spellcasting 201: The Sorcerer's Appliance | Legend Entertainment | Legend Entertainment | MS-DOS | 1991 | | |
| Timequest | Legend Entertainment | Legend Entertainment | MS-DOS | 1991 | | |
| Space Quest IV: Roger Wilco and the Time Rippers | Sierra On-Line | Sierra On-Line | MS-DOS, Windows, Macintosh, Amiga, PC-98 | 4 March 1991 | Voice acting in 1992 CD release | Sierra's Creative Interpreter (SCI) |
| Metal Slader Glory | HAL Laboratory | HAL Laboratory | Famicom | 30 August 1991 | | |
| Leisure Suit Larry 5: Passionate Patti Does a Little Undercover Work | Sierra On-Line | Sierra On-Line | MS-DOS, Amiga | 7 September 1991 | | Sierra's Creative Interpreter (SCI) |
| Saori: Bishōjo-tachi no Yakata | X-Shitei | X-Shitei | PC-98, FM Towns, X68000 | 18 October 1991 | | |
| Cobra Mission: Panic in Cobra City | INOS | Hard, Megatech Software | PC-98, MS-DOS | 25 October 1991 | | |
| Monkey Island 2: LeChuck's Revenge | LucasArts | LucasArts | Original version MS-DOS, Mac OS, Amiga, FM Towns; Special edition iOS, Microsoft Windows, PlayStation 3, Xbox 360 | December 1991 | Special edition released in 2010 | SCUMM |
| Amazon: Guardians of Eden | Access Software | Access Software | MS-DOS | 1992 | | |
| B.A.T. II – The Koshan Conspiracy | Computer's Dream | Ubi Soft | Amiga, Atari ST, MS-DOS | 1992 | | |
| Bargon Attack | Coktel Vision | Coktel Vision | MS-DOS | 1992 | | |
| The Dagger of Amon Ra | Sierra On-Line | Sierra On-Line | MS-DOS, Windows | 1992 | Sequel to The Colonel's Bequest | Sierra's Creative Interpreter (SCI) |
| The Dark Half | Symtus | Capstone | Amiga, Macintosh, MS-DOS | 1992 | | |
| Dark Seed | Cyberdreams | Cyberdreams | Amiga, CD32, MS-DOS, Macintosh, Saturn, PlayStation | 1992 | | |
| Daughter of Serpents | Eldritch Games | Millennium Interactive | MS-DOS | 1992 | Also known as The Scroll | |
| Dead of the Brain: Day of the Living Dead | FairyTale | NEC | PC-98, FM Towns, MSX, X68000, PC Engine Super CD-ROM² | 1992 | | |
| Dune | Cryo Interactive | Virgin Interactive | MS-DOS, Amiga, Sega CD | 1992 | Adventure and strategy hybrid, sequels dropped the adventure element | |
| Eternam | Infogrames | Infogrames | MS-DOS, FM Towns | 1992 | 1993 released in CD-ROM | |
| Gobliins 2: The Prince Buffoon | Coktel Vision | Sierra On-Line | Amiga, Atari ST, MS-DOS, Windows | 1992 | | |
| Hook | Ocean | Ocean | Amiga, Atari ST, MS-DOS | 1992 | | |
| Hugo III, Jungle of Doom! | Gray Design Associates | Gray Design Associates | MS-DOS, Windows | 1992 | | |
| Inca | Coktel Vision | Sierra On-Line | MS-DOS, CD-i | 1992 | | |
| Inspector Gadget: Mission 1 – Global Terror! | Azeroth, Inc. | Azeroth, Inc. | MS-DOS | 1992 | | |
| The Island of Dr. Brain | Sierra On-Line | Sierra On-Line | MS-DOS | 1992 | | |
| KGB | Cryo Interactive | Virgin Entertainment | MS-DOS, Amiga | 1992 | Also known as Conspiracy | |
| Leather Goddesses of Phobos 2: Gas Pump Girls Meet the Pulsating Inconvenience from Planet X! | Infocom | Activision | IBM PC | 1992 | | |
| The Legacy: Realm of Terror | Magnetic Scrolls | MicroProse | MS-DOS | 1992 | | |
| Linus Spacehead's Cosmic Crusade | Codemasters (NES version), Supersonic Software | Camerica (NES version), Codemasters | NES, Master System, Mega Drive, Game Gear, Amiga, MS-DOS | 1992 | Also known as Cosmic Spacehead | |
| The Lost Files of Sherlock Holmes: The Case of the Serrated Scalpel | Mythos Software, Inc. | Electronic Arts | 3DO, MS-DOS | 1992 | | |
| Nippon Safes Inc. | Dynabyte | Dynabyte, Global Software | MS-DOS, Amiga | 1992 | | |
| The Palace of Deceit: The Dragon's Plight | Game Syndicate Productions (Cliff Bleszinski) | Innervision Software | Windows 3.x | 1992 | Remake of 1991 text adventure | |
| Plan 9 from Outer Space | Gremlin Ireland | Gremlin Graphics | Atari ST, Amiga | 1992 | | |
| The Prophecy | Coktel Vision | Coktel Vision, Sierra On-Line | Amiga, Atari ST, MS-DOS | 1992 | Also known as Ween: The Prophecy | |
| Putt-Putt Joins the Parade | Humongous Entertainment | Humongous Entertainment | 3DO, MS-DOS, Macintosh, Windows | 1992 | | |
| Ringworld: Revenge of the Patriarch | Tsunami Games | Tsunami Games | MS-DOS | 1992 | | |
| Sherlock Holmes: Consulting Detective Vol. II | ICOM Simulations | ICOM Simulations | MS-DOS, TurboGrafx-CD, Mega-CD | 1992 | | |
| Spellcasting 301: Spring Break | Legend Entertainment | Legend Entertainment | MS-DOS | 1992 | | |
| Star Trek: 25th Anniversary | Interplay | Interplay | Amiga, Macintosh, MS-DOS | 1992 | | |
| Nightshade | Beam Software | Ultra Games | NES | January 1992 | | |
| Business Wars | Hect | Hect | Famicom | 24 January 1992 | | |
| Frederik Pohl's Gateway | Legend Entertainment | Legend Entertainment | MS-DOS, Windows 95 | June 1992 | | |
| Indiana Jones and the Fate of Atlantis | LucasArts | LucasArts | MS-DOS, Mac OS, Amiga, FM Towns, Windows, Wii | June 1992 | | SCUMM |
| Lure of the Temptress | Revolution Software | Virgin Interactive Entertainment | MS-DOS, Amiga, Atari ST | June 1992 | | |
| An American Tail: The Computer Adventures of Fievel and His Friends | Manley & Associates | Capstone Software | MS-DOS | August 1992 | | |
| Quest for Glory III: Wages of War | Sierra On-Line | Sierra On-Line | MS-DOS, Apple Macintosh | August 1992 | | Sierra's Creative Interpreter (SCI) |
| The Legend of Kyrandia: Fables and Fiends | Westwood Studios | Virgin Interactive | Amiga, MS-DOS, FM Towns, Macintosh, PC-98 | 1 August 1992 | | |
| King's Quest VI: Heir Today, Gone Tomorrow | Sierra On-Line | Sierra On-Line | MS-DOS, Windows, Mac OS, Amiga | 13 October 1992 | | Sierra's Creative Interpreter (SCI) |
| Curse of Enchantia | Core Design | Core Design, Virgin Games (PC CD-ROM) | Amiga, MS-DOS | November 1992 | | |
| Rex Nebular and the Cosmic Gender Bender | MicroProse | MicroProse | MS-DOS, Mac OS | November 1992 | | |
| The Adventures of Melvin Freebush | Sherwood Forest Games | Sherwood Forest Games | MS-DOS | 1993 | | |
| The Beverly Hillbillies | Synergistic Software | Capstone Software | MS-DOS | 1993 | | |
| BloodNet | MicroProse | MicroProse | Amiga, MS-DOS | 1993 | | |
| Blue Force | Tsunami Games | Tsunami Games | MS-DOS | 1993 | | |
| Cosmology of Kyoto | Softedge | Yano Electric | MS-DOS, Mac OS, Windows | 1993 | English release first in 1994 | |
| Dare to Dream | Epic MegaGames | Epic MegaGames | Windows 3.x | 1993 | | |
| Dracula Unleashed | ICOM Simulations | Viacom New Media | MS-DOS, Sega CD, Mac OS, PlayStation 2 & Xbox | 1993 | | |
| Eric the Unready | Legend Entertainment | Legend Entertainment | MS-DOS | 1993 | | |
| Fatty Bear's Birthday Surprise | Humongous Entertainment | Humongous Entertainment | 3DO, MS-DOS, Macintosh, iOS, Windows, Android | 1993 | | |
| Freddy Pharkas: Frontier Pharmacist | Sierra On-Line | Sierra On-Line | MS-DOS, Macintosh, Windows 3.x | 1993 | | Sierra's Creative Interpreter (SCI) |
| Goblins Quest 3 | Coktel Vision | Sierra On-Line | Amiga, MS-DOS | 1993 | | |
| Inca II: Wiracocha | Coktel Vision | Sierra On-Line | MS-DOS | 1993 | Also known as Inca II: Nations of Immortality | |
| Innocent Until Caught | Divide By Zero | Psygnosis | Amiga, MS-DOS | 1993 | | |
| Isle of the Dead | Rainmaker Software | Merit Software | MS-DOS | 1993 | | |
| The Legend of Kyrandia: Hand of Fate | Westwood Studios | Virgin Interactive | MS-DOS, FM Towns, PC-98 | 1993 | | |
| Lost in Time | Coktel Vision | Coktel Vision, Sierra On-Line | MS-DOS | 1993 | | |
| Lost Secret of the Rainforest | Sierra On-Line | Sierra On-Line | MS-DOS, Windows | 1993 | Sequel to EcoQuest | Sierra's Creative Interpreter (SCI) |
| Pepper's Adventures in Time | Sierra On-Line | Sierra On-Line | MS-DOS, Windows 3.x | 1993 | | |
| Putt-Putt Goes to the Moon | Humongous Entertainment | Humongous Entertainment | 3DO, MS-DOS, Macintosh, Windows | 1993 | | |
| Return of the Phantom | MicroProse | MicroProse | MS-DOS | 1993 | | |
| Sherlock Holmes: Consulting Detective Vol. III | ICOM Simulations | ICOM Simulations | MS-DOS, Mac OS | 1993 | | |
| The Journeyman Project | Presto Studios | Presto Studios, Sanctuary Woods, Bandai | Mac OS, Windows | 6 January 1993 | First pre-rendered 3D adventure game. Updated Journeyman Project Turbo! rerelease in 1994. | |
| Space Quest V: Roger Wilco – The Next Mutation | Dynamix | Sierra On-Line | MS-DOS | 5 February 1993 | | Sierra's Creative Interpreter (SCI) |
| Tajemnica Statuetki | Metropolis Software House | Metropolis Software House | MS-DOS | 12 February 1993 | Also known as The Mystery of the Statuette | |
| Veil of Darkness | Event Horizon Software | Strategic Simulations, Inc. | MS-DOS, FM Towns, PC-98 | March 1993 | | |
| Ihatovo Monogatari | Hect | Hect | Super Famicom, Satellaview | 5 March 1993 | | |
| Shadow of the Comet | Infogrames | Infogrames | MS-DOS | 25 March 1993 | | |
| The 7th Guest | Trilobyte | Virgin Interactive | MS-DOS, CD-i, Mac OS, iOS | 1 April 1993 | | |
| Leisure Suit Larry 6: Shape Up or Slip Out! | Sierra On-Line | Sierra On-Line | MS-DOS, Windows | 15 June 1993 | | Sierra's Creative Interpreter (SCI) |
| Maniac Mansion: Day of the Tentacle | LucasArts | LucasArts | MS-DOS, Mac OS | 25 June 1993 | | SCUMM |
| Return to Zork | Infocom | Activision | Macintosh, MS-DOS, PC-FX, PlayStation, Saturn, FM Towns | 15 September 1993 | | |
| Myst | Cyan | Broderbund, Midway Games, Mean Hamster Software, Sunsoft, Maximum Family Games, Funbox Media | Mac OS, Saturn, PlayStation, 3DO, Windows, Jaguar CD, CD-i, AmigaOS, PlayStation Portable, Nintendo DS, iOS, Nintendo 3DS | 24 September 1993 | | |
| Simon the Sorcerer | Adventure Soft | Adventure Soft | Amiga, CD32, MS-DOS, RISC OS | 27 September 1993 | | |
| Beyond Shadowgate | ICOM Simulations | Turbo Technologies Inc. | TurboGrafx CD | October 1993 | | |
| Companions of Xanth | Legend Entertainment | Legend Entertainment | MS-DOS | November 1993 | | |
| Gadget: Invention, Travel, & Adventure | Synergy | Synergy | Windows, Mac OS | November 1993 | Released outside Japan first in 1994 | |
| Police Quest: Open Season | Sierra On-Line | Sierra On-Line | Windows, MS-DOS, Apple Macintosh System 7 | November 1993 | | |
| Sam & Max Hit the Road | LucasArts | LucasArts | MS-DOS, Mac OS, Windows, Amiga | November 1993 | | SCUMM |
| Star Trek: Judgment Rites | Interplay | Interplay | MS-DOS, Macintosh | November 1993 | | |
| Gateway II: Homeworld | Legend Entertainment | Legend Entertainment | MS-DOS, Windows 95 | December 1993 | | |
| Jack in the Dark | Infogrames | Interplay, Infogrames | MS-DOS | December 1993 | | |
| Quest for Glory: Shadows of Darkness | Sierra On-Line | Sierra On-Line | MS-DOS, Windows | December 1993 | | Sierra's Creative Interpreter (SCI) |
| Mansion of Hidden Souls | System Sacom | Sega, Vic Tokai | Sega CD | 10 December 1993 | | |
| Gabriel Knight: Sins of the Fathers | Sierra On-Line | Sierra On-Line | MS-DOS, Macintosh, Windows | 17 December 1993 | | Sierra's Creative Interpreter (SCI) |
| Jurassic Park | Sega of America | Sega | Sega CD | 17 December 1993 | | |
| 7 dní a 7 nocí | Pterodon | Vochozka Trading | Amiga, MS-DOS | 1994 | | |
| Abenteuer Europa | Ego Software | Social Democratic Party of Germany | MS-DOS | 1994 | | |
| Are You Afraid of the Dark? The Tale of Orpheo's Curse | Viacom New Media | Tec Toy Indústria de Brinquedos S.A. | Mac OS, Windows | 1994 | | |
| Commander Blood | Cryo Interactive | Mindscape | MS-DOS | 1994 | | |
| DreamWeb | Creative Reality | Empire | MS-DOS, Amiga | 1994 | | |
| Hell: A Cyberpunk Thriller | Take-Two Interactive Software | GameTek | MS-DOS, 3DO | 1994 | | |
| Igor: Objective Uikokahonia | Pendulo Studios | Dro Soft, Dinamic Multimedia | MS-DOS | 1994 | | |
| Inherit the Earth: Quest for the Orb | The Dreamers Guild | New World Computing, Wyrmkeep Entertainment | Amiga, Mac OS, OS X, MS-DOS, Linux, Windows, Pocket PC, ScummVM | 1994 | | |
| The Legend of Kyrandia: Malcolm's Revenge | Westwood Studios | Virgin Interactive | MS-DOS, Macintosh | 1994 | | |
| Mavlin: Vesmírný únik | Mael Software Group | Mael Software Group | MS-DOS | 1994 | | |
| Noctropolis | Flashpoint Productions | Electronic Arts | MS-DOS | 1994 | | |
| Plague of the Moon | Rebelsoft | Rebelsoft | MS-DOS | 1994 | | |
| Return to Ringworld | Tsunami Games | Tsunami Games | MS-DOS | 1994 | | |
| Stíny noci | Computer Experts | Vochozka Trading | MS-DOS | 1994 | | |
| Superhero League of Hoboken | Legend Entertainment | Legend Entertainment | MS-DOS | 1994 | | |
| Under a Killing Moon | Access Software | Access Software, U.S. Gold | Windows | 1994 | Part of the Tex Murphy series | |
| Universe | Core Design | Core Design | Amiga, CD32, MS-DOS | 1994 | | |
| Valhalla and the Lord of Infinity | Vulcan Software | Vulcan Software | Amiga | 1994 | | |
| Wrath of the Gods | Luminaria | Luminaria | Windows, Mac OS | 1994 | | |
| Zeddas: Servant of Sheol | Caravan Interactive | Synergy Interactive | Macintosh, Windows, Saturn | 1994 | | |
| Dragonsphere | MicroProse | MicroProse | MS-DOS | January 1994 | | |
| Beneath a Steel Sky | Revolution Software | Virgin Interactive Entertainment | MS-DOS, Amiga, CD32, Atari ST iOS | March 1994 | | |
| Takeru: Letter of the Law | Fun Project | Panasonic, Sunsoft, Network Entertainment | 3DO, Windows, Mac | 29 April 1994 | | |
| Tajemství Oslího ostrova | Pterodon Software | Vochozka Trading | MS-DOS | June 1994 | Monkey Island parody also known as The Secret of Donkey Island | |
| Desire | C's Ware, El Dia (remake) | C's Ware, El Dia (remake) | PC-98, FM Towns, Saturn, Windows, PlayStation 2, PlayStation Vita, PlayStation 4, Nintendo Switch | 22 July 1994 | | |
| Policenauts | Konami | Konami | NEC PC-9821, 3DO, PlayStation, Saturn | 29 July 1994 | | |
| Burn Cycle | TripMedia | Philips Interactive Media | CD-i, Mac OS, Windows | October 1994 | | |
| Death Gate | Legend Entertainment | Legend Entertainment, Virgin Interactive Entertainment | MS-DOS | November 1994 | | |
| Freddi Fish and the Case of the Missing Kelp Seeds | Humongous Entertainment | Humongous Entertainment | Mac OS, Windows | 7 November 1994 | | |
| King's Quest VII: The Princeless Bride | Sierra On-Line | Sierra On-Line | MS-DOS, Windows, Macintosh | 23 November 1994 | | Sierra's Creative Interpreter (SCI) |
| The Bizarre Adventures of Woodruff and the Schnibble | Coktel Vision | Sierra On-Line | Windows | December 1994 | | |
| The Mansion of Hidden Souls | System Sacom | Sega | Saturn | 2 December 1994 | English release in 1995 | |
| Dragon Lore: The Legend Begins | Cryo Interactive | Mindscape, KSS | MS-DOS, 3DO, PC-98 | 31 December 1994 | | |
| The Adventures of Down Under Dan | PowerVision | Guildsoft Games | MS-DOS | 1995 | | |
| Alien Virus | Trecision, Visionaries International | Nova Spring | MS-DOS | 1995 | | |
| Anatema: Legenda o prekliati | Rune Software | Riki Computer Software | MS-DOS | 1995 | | |
| The Beast Within: A Gabriel Knight Mystery | Sierra On-Line | Sierra On-Line | MS-DOS, Macintosh, Windows | 1995 | | |
| The Big Red Adventure | Dynabyte | Core Design | Windows | 1995 | | |
| Bureau 13 | Take-Two Interactive | GameTek | MS-DOS, Windows | 1995 | | |
| Chewy: Esc from F5 | Blue Byte | New Generation Software | MS-DOS | 1995 | | |
| Chop Suey | Theresa Duncan | 20th Century Fox Home Entertainment | Windows, Macintosh | 1995 | | |
| Congo: Descent Into Zinj | Viacom New Media | Viacom New Media | Windows, Classic Mac OS | 1995 | | |
| Dračí Historie | NoSense | Vochozka Trading | MS-DOS | 1995 | | |
| The Daedalus Encounter | Mechadeus | Virgin Interactive | Mac OS, 3DO, Windows | 1995 | | |
| The Dark Eye | Inscape | Time Warner Interactive, Expert Software, Inc. | Mac OS, Windows | 1995 | | |
| Discworld | Teeny Weeny Games, Perfect 10 Productions | Psygnosis | MS-DOS, Mac, PlayStation, Saturn | 1995 | | |
| Dust: A Tale of the Wired West | Cyberflix | GTE Entertainment | MS-DOS, Macintosh | 1995 | | |
| Flight of the Amazon Queen | Interactive Binary Illusions | Renegade Software | Amiga, MS-DOS | 1995 | | |
| Frankenstein: Through the Eyes of the Monster | Amazing Media | Interplay | Saturn, Windows 3.x, Mac | 1995 | | |
| Golden Gate Killer | Interworks | Grolier Electronic Publishing Inc | Windows 95, Windows 3.1, Mac OS | 1995 | | |
| Guilty | Divide By Zero | Psygnosis | MS-DOS | 1995 | | |
| Heaven's Dawn | Art 9 Entertainment Inc. | Manaccom Pty Ltd. | MS-DOS | 1995 | | |
| In the 1st Degree | Adair & Armstrong | Broderbund | Windows, Mac | 1995 | | |
| Jewels of the Oracle | Dreamcatcher Interactive | Dreamcatcher Interactive | Windows, Mac, Saturn | 1995 | | |
| The Journeyman Project 2: Buried in Time | Presto Studios | Sanctuary Woods | Windows, Mac OS | 1995 | | |
| Karma: Curse of the 12 Caves | Dreamcatcher Interactive | Dreamcatcher Interactive | Windows, Macintosh, Saturn, PlayStation | 1995 | | |
| The Martian Chronicles | Byron Preiss Multimedia Company | Simon & Schuster | Windows, Mac OS | 1995 | | |
| Mise Quadam | Agawa | JRC Interactive | MS-DOS | 1995 | | |
| Operation: Weather Disaster | Human Code | Discovery Channel Multimedia | Macintosh, Windows | 1995 | | |
| The Orion Conspiracy | Divide By Zero | Domark | MS-DOS, Windows | 1995 | | |
| Panic in the Park | Imagination Pilots | WarnerActive | Windows | 1995 | | |
| Prisoner of Ice | Infogrames | Infogrames | MS-DOS, Windows, Mac OS, Saturn, PlayStation | 1995 | | |
| Ramonovo Kouzlo | Riki Computer Games | Vochozka Trading | MS-DOS | 1995 | | |
| Silverload | Millennium Interactive | Vic Tokai, Psygnosis | MS-DOS, PlayStation | 1995 | | |
| Skaut Kwatermaster | LK Avalon | LK Avalon | Amiga, MS-DOS | 1995 | | |
| Skyborg: Into the Vortex | SkyBox International | SkyBox International | Windows, Mac OS | 1995 | | |
| Sołtys | LK Avalon | LK Avalon | MS-DOS | 1995 | | |
| Touché: The Adventures of the Fifth Musketeer | Clipper Software | CentreGold, U.S. Gold | MS-DOS, Windows 95, ScummVM | 1995 | | |
| Valhalla: Before the War | Vulcan Software | Vulcan Software | Amiga, Windows | 1995 | | |
| Wolfsbane | Midnight Games | Merit Studios, Inc. | MS-DOS | 1995 | | |
| Teenagent | Metropolis Software House | Metropolis Software, Union Logic | MS-DOS, Amiga | February 1995 | | |
| Lost Eden | Cryo Interactive | Virgin Interactive | MS-DOS, Mac OS, 3DO, CD-i | March 1995 | | |
| Nocturnal Illusion | Apricot | Excellents Japan, JAST USA | PC-98, Windows | 22 April 1995 | | |
| Full Throttle | LucasArts | LucasArts | MS-DOS, Mac OS, Windows | 19 May 1995 | | |
| Aliens: A Comic Book Adventure | Cryo Interactive | Mindscape | MS-DOS | 25 May 1995 | | |
| Star Trek: The Next Generation – A Final Unity | Spectrum HoloByte | MicroProse | MS-DOS, Macintosh | 31 May 1995 | | |
| SPQR: The Empire's Darkest Hour | CyberSites | GT Interactive | Windows, Mac OS | July 1995 | | |
| Space Quest 6: The Spinal Frontier | Sierra On-Line | Sierra On-Line | MS-DOS, Windows, Macintosh | 11 July 1995 | | Sierra's Creative Interpreter (SCI) |
| Roberta Williams' Phantasmagoria | Sierra On-Line | Sierra On-Line | Windows, Saturn | 24 August 1995 | | |
| Beavis and Butt-Head in Virtual Stupidity | Viacom New Media | Viacom New Media | Windows, PlayStation (JP Only) | 31 August 1995 | | |
| Scooby-Doo Mystery | The Illusions Gaming Company | Acclaim Entertainment & Sunsoft | Sega Genesis | September 1995 | | |
| Clock Tower | Human Entertainment | Human Entertainment | Super Famicom, PlayStation, WonderSwan, Windows | 14 September 1995 | | |
| Ripley's Believe It or Not!: The Riddle of Master Lu | Sanctuary Woods | Sanctuary Woods | MS-DOS | 30 September 1995 | | |
| Bad Day on the Midway | Inscape | Inscape | Windows, Mac | 31 October 1995 | | |
| I Have No Mouth, and I Must Scream | The Dreamers Guild | Cyberdreams | Mac OS, MS-DOS | 31 October 1995 | | |
| Torin's Passage | Sierra On-Line | Sierra On-Line | MS-DOS, Windows 3.x, Windows 95, Mac OS | 31 October 1995 | | |
| Majestic Part I: Alien Encounter | Istvan Pely, Stephan Sherban, Seth Jones | Piranha Interactive Publishing | Windows, Macintosh | November 1995 | | |
| Mission Critical | Legend Entertainment | Legend Entertainment | MS-DOS, Windows 95 | November 1995 | | |
| Shivers | Sierra On-Line | Sierra On-Line | Windows, Mac OS | November 1995 | | Sierra's Creative Interpreter (SCI) |
| Simon the Sorcerer II: The Lion, the Wizard and the Wardrobe | Adventure Soft | Adventure Soft | Amiga, Macintosh, Windows, MS-DOS | November 1995 | | |
| Total Distortion | Pop Rocket | Pop Rocket | Mac OS, Windows | November 1995 | | |
| Mr. Potato Head Saves Veggie Valley | Duck Soup Productions Inc., Turning Point Software | Hasbro Electronic Entertainment | Windows, Macintosh, Apple Pippin | 13 November 1995 | | |
| EVE Burst Error | C's Ware | Kadokawa Shoten, Imagineer | PC-98, Saturn, Windows, PlayStation 2, PlayStation Portable | 22 November 1995 | | |
| Dark Seed II | Destiny Media Technologies | Cyberdreams | Windows, Macintosh, Saturn, PlayStation | 30 November 1995 | | |
| The Dig | LucasArts | LucasArts | MS-DOS, Mac OS | 30 November 1995 | | SCUMM |
| The 11th Hour | Trilobyte | Virgin Interactive | Windows, Mac OS | December 1995 | | |
| Shannara | Legend Entertainment | Legend Entertainment | MS-DOS | December 1995 | | |
| Chronomaster | DreamForge Intertainment | IntraCorp, Capstone Software | MS-DOS | 20 December 1995 | | |
| Robot City | Brooklyn Multimedia | Byron Preiss Multimedia | Mac OS, Windows | 31 December 1995 | | |
| Alien Incident | Housemarque | GameTek | MS-DOS | 1996 | | |
| Amber: Journeys Beyond | Hue Forest Entertainment | Hue Forest Entertainment (mail order), Cendant Software, Changeling Software, Graphic Simulations Corporation | Mac OS, Windows 95 | 1996 | | |
| Blue Ice | Art of Mind Productions | Psygnosis | MS-DOS, Windows 3.x, Mac OS | 1996 | | |
| Bud Tucker in Double Trouble | Funsoft | Funsoft | MS-DOS | 1996 | | |
| Creature Crunch | TechToons Ltd. | Class6 Interactive | Windows | 1996 | | |
| The Dame Was Loaded | Beam Software | Philips Interactive Media | MS-DOS, Mac OS, Windows | 1996 | | |
| Discworld II: Missing Presumed...!? | Perfect Entertainment | Psygnosis (PC, PS), Sega (Saturn) | MS-DOS, Windows, PlayStation, Saturn | 1996 | | |
| Dragon Lore II: The Heart of the Dragon Man | Cryo Interactive | Cryo Interactive | MS-DOS, Windows | 1996 | | |
| Fable | Simbiosis Interactive | Sir-tech Software, Inc. | MS-DOS, Windows | 1996 | | |
| The Gene Machine | Divide By Zero | Vic Tokai | MS-DOS | 1996 | | |
| Kingdom II: Shadoan | Virtual Image Productions | Interplay | CD-i, MS-DOS, Mac OS | 1996 | | |
| Master of Dimensions | Eidos Interactive | Eidos Interactive | Windows | 1996 | | |
| Monty Python & the Quest for the Holy Grail | 7th Level | 7th Level, Panasonic Interactive Media | MS-DOS, Mac OS | 1996 | | |
| Mutation of J.B. | Invention | Riki Computer Games | MS-DOS | 1996 | | |
| Noir: A Shadowy Thriller | Cyberdreams | Cyberdreams | MS-DOS | 1996 | | |
| Orion Burger | Sanctuary Woods | Eidos Interactive | MS-DOS, Mac OS | 1996 | | |
| Qin: Tomb of the Middle Kingdom | Learning Technologies Interactive | Time Warner Electronic Publishing, SouthPeak Games, Attica | MS-DOS, Windows, Mac OS | 1996 | | |
| Three Sisters' Story | Sakura Soft | JAST USA | MS-DOS, PC-98, Windows | 1996 | | |
| U.F.O.s | Artech | Corel Corporation, Hoffmann + Associates Inc. | Macintosh, Windows 95 | 1996 | | |
| Urban Runner | Coktel Vision | Sierra On-Line | MS-DOS, Windows | 1996 | | |
| Valhalla and the Fortress of Eve | Vulcan Software | Vulcan Software | Amiga, Windows, BlackBerry | 1996 | | |
| Angel Devoid: Face of the Enemy | Electric Dreams | Mindscape | MS-DOS | 31 January 1996 | | |
| Chronicles of the Sword | Synthetic Dimensions | Psygnosis | Windows, PlayStation | 23 February 1996 | | |
| Bad Mojo | Pulse Entertainment | Acclaim | Windows, Macintosh | 29 February 1996 | | |
| Ripper | Take-Two Interactive | Take-Two Interactive | MS-DOS, Mac OS | 29 February 1996 | | |
| Spycraft: The Great Game | Activision | Activision | MS-DOS, Mac OS, Windows | 29 February 1996 | | |
| Zork Nemesis | Zombie LLC | Activision | Macintosh, MS-DOS, Windows 95 | 29 February 1996 | | |
| Secrets of the Luxor | Mojave | Ubi Soft | Windows, Macintosh | 4 April 1996 | | |
| Normality | Gremlin Interactive | Interplay | MS-DOS | June 1996 | | |
| Kingdom O' Magic | SCi | SCi | MS-DOS | 31 July 1996 | | |
| The Pandora Directive | Access Software | Access Software | MS-DOS, Windows | 31 July 1996 | Part of the Tex Murphy series | |
| Azrael's Tear | Intelligent Games | Mindscape | MS-DOS, Windows 95 | 26 August 1996 | | |
| Harvester | DigiFX Interactive | Merit Studios, Virgin Interactive | MS-DOS | 31 August 1996 | | |
| The Lost Files of Sherlock Holmes: The Case of the Rose Tattoo | Mythos Software, Inc. | Electronic Arts | MS-DOS | 27 September 1996 | | |
| Broken Sword: The Shadow of the Templars | Revolution Software | Virgin Interactive Entertainment | MS-DOS, Windows, PlayStation | 30 September 1996 | Part 1 of the Broken Sword series | |
| Timelapse | GTE Interactive Media | Philips Interactive Media, Inc., Hammerhead Entertainment | Windows, Macintosh | 16 October 1996 | | |
| Lighthouse: The Dark Being | Sierra On-Line | Sierra On-Line | MS-DOS, Windows, Mac OS | 28 October 1996 | | |
| Ace Ventura: The CD-Rom Game | 7th Level | Bomico Entertainment Software | Windows | 31 October 1996 | | |
| Blazing Dragons | The Illusions Gaming Company | Crystal Dynamics & Mindscape | Sony PlayStation, Saturn | 31 October 1996 | | |
| Drowned God: Conspiracy of the Ages | Epic Multimedia Group | Inscape | Windows | 31 October 1996 | | |
| The Neverhood | The Neverhood, Inc. | DreamWorks Interactive | Windows, PlayStation (Japan only) | 31 October 1996 | | |
| The Pink Panther: Passport to Peril | Wanderlust Interactive | BMG Interactive, Simon & Schuster & MGM Interactive | Windows | 31 October 1996 | | |
| Toonstruck | Burst Studios | Virgin Interactive | Windows, MS-DOS, Mac OS | 31 October 1996 | | |
| Rama | Sierra On-Line | Sierra On-Line | MS-DOS, Windows, Mac OS, PlayStation | November 1996 | | |
| Titanic: Adventure Out of Time | Cyberflix | GTE Entertainment, Europress | Windows, Mac OS | 20 November 1996 | | |
| Leisure Suit Larry: Love for Sail! | Sierra On-Line | Sierra On-Line | MS-DOS, Mac OS, Windows | 26 November 1996 | | |
| Phantasmagoria: A Puzzle of Flesh | Sierra On-Line | Sierra On-Line | MS-DOS, Windows | 26 November 1996 | | |
| Clock Tower 2 | Human Entertainment | Human Entertainment, ASCII Entertainment | PlayStation | 13 December 1996 | Known as Clock Tower outside Japan | |
| Yu-no: A Girl Who Chants Love at the Bound of This World | ELF | ELF | PC-98 (original release), Saturn, Windows; Remake; PlayStation Vita, PlayStation 4, Nintendo Switch, Windows | 26 December 1996 | Saturn version released in 1997 and remake version in 2017 | |
| Ark of Time | Trecision | International Computer Entertainment Ltd. | MS-DOS | 1997 | | |
| The City of Lost Children | Psygnosis | Psygnosis | MS-DOS, PlayStation | 1997 | | |
| Crusader: Adventure Out of Time | Index+ | Europress | Windows, Mac OS | 1997 | | |
| Egypt 1156 B.C. | Cryo Interactive Entertainment | Cryo Interactive Entertainment | Windows, PlayStation | 1997 | | |
| Jack Orlando | TopWare Interactive | TopWare Interactive, JoWood Productions (Director's cut) | MS-DOS, Windows | 1997 | | |
| Riana Rouge | Black Dragon Productions | Black Dragon Productions | Windows, Mac OS | 1997 | | |
| Sentient | Psygnosis | Psygnosis | MS-DOS, Windows, PlayStation | 1997 | | |
| The Simpsons: Virtual Springfield | Digital Evolution | Fox Interactive | Windows, Mac OS | 1997 | | |
| Versailles 1685 | Cryo Interactive | Cryo Interactive | Windows, Mac OS, PlayStation, MS-DOS | 1997 | | |
| Voodoo Kid | Infogrames, Eric Sterling Collins, Hubert Chardot | Infogrames | Windows 3.x, Windows 95 | 1997 | | |
| WuKung: A Legendary Adventure | Abudoe Software | Abudoe Software | Windows 3.x, Windows 95 | 1997 | | |
| Realms of the Haunting | Gremlin Interactive | Interplay | Windows, MS-DOS | January 1997 | | |
| Obsidian | Rocket Science Games | SegaSoft | Windows, Mac OS | 13 January 1997 | | |
| Yaku Tsuu: Noroi no Game | Idea Factory | | PlayStation | 7 February 1997 | | |
| Atlantis: The Lost Tales | Cryo Interactive | Dreamcatcher Interactive | MS-DOS, Windows, Saturn, PlayStation | March 1997 | | |
| The Last Express | Smoking Car Productions | Broderbund, Interplay | Windows, Mac OS, MS-DOS, iOS | 30 March 1997 | | |
| Shivers II: Harvest of Souls | Sierra On-Line | Sierra On-Line | Windows | 9 April 1997 | | |
| Callahan's Crosstime Saloon | Legend Entertainment | Take-Two Interactive | MS-DOS | 16 April 1997 | | |
| Safecracker | Daydream Software | GT Interactive | Windows, Macintosh | May 1997 | | |
| Duckman: The Graphic Adventures of a Private Dick | The Illusions Gaming Company | Playmates Interactive Entertainment | Windows | 31 May 1997 | | |
| The Feeble Files | Adventure Soft | Adventure Soft, Bomico, Idigicon, Infogrames | Amiga, Mac, Windows | June 1997 | | |
| The Journeyman Project: Pegasus Prime | Presto Studios | Acclaim, Bandai | Mac OS, PlayStation, Apple Pippin | June 1997 | | |
| The Space Bar | Boffo Games | Rocket Science Games, SegaSoft | Windows, Mac OS | 8 July 1997 | | |
| Spy Fox in "Dry Cereal" | Humongous Entertainment | Atari, Majesco | Windows, Mac OS, Wii, iOS | 2 September 1997 | | |
| Temüjin: A Supernatural Adventure | SouthPeak Games | SouthPeak Games | Windows | 2 October 1997 | | |
| Moonlight Syndrome | Human Entertainment | Human Entertainment | PlayStation | 9 October 1997 | | |
| Broken Sword II: The Smoking Mirror | Revolution Software | Virgin Interactive, Crave Entertainment, Kalypso Media | Windows, PlayStation, Mac OS | 17 October 1997 | Part 2 of the Broken Sword series | |
| The Pink Panther: Hokus Pokus Pink | Wanderlust Interactive | Ravensburger Interactive Media GmbHe & MGM Interactive | Windows | 18 October 1997 | | |
| Dark Earth | Kalisto Entertainment | Microprose | Microsoft Windows | 22 October 1997 | | |
| Armed & Delirious | Makh-Shevet | Sir-Tech | Windows | 24 October 1997 | Also known as GrannyX in Israel and Dementia in Europe. | |
| Riven | Cyan | Broderbund, Acclaim Entertainment, Sega, Mean Hamster Software | Mac OS, Windows, Saturn, PlayStation, Pocket PC, iOS | 31 October 1997 | | |
| The Curse of Monkey Island | LucasArts | LucasArts | Windows | November 1997 | | |
| Zork: Grand Inquisitor | Activision | Activision | Mac OS, Windows | 4 November 1997 | | |
| Blade Runner | Westwood Studios | Virgin Interactive Entertainment | Windows | 14 November 1997 | | |
| Hollywood Monsters | Pendulo Studios | Dinamic Multimedia | Windows | December 1997 | | |
| Ankh: The Tales of Mystery | Artex Software | Acorn Computer Enterprises, Koala Soft, R-Comp Interactive | Acorn RISC | 1998 | | |
| Forestia | Daddy Oak | LaserMedia, A.W. Bruna Uitgevers B.V. | Windows, Mac OS | 1998 | | |
| Morpheus | Soap Bubble Productions | Piranha Interactive Publishing, Tiburon Interactive Publishing | Windows, Mac OS | 1998 | | |
| Nightlong: Union City Conspiracy | Team17, Trecision | Balmoral Software, PXL computers | Windows, Amiga | 1998 | | |
| ZeroZone | R&P Electronic Media | Cryo Interactive | Windows | 1998 | | |
| The Journeyman Project 3: Legacy of Time | Presto Studios | Red Orb Entertainment | Windows 95, Mac OS, OS X (PPC only) | 12 February 1998 | | |
| Black Dahlia | Take-Two Interactive | Interplay | Windows | 25 February 1998 | | |
| Tex Murphy: Overseer | Access Software | Access Software | Windows | 28 February 1998 | Part of the Tex Murphy series | |
| Clock Tower: Ghost Head | Human Entertainment | Human Entertainment, Agetec | PlayStation | 12 March 1998 | Known outside Japan as Clock Tower II: The Struggle Within | |
| Of Light and Darkness: The Prophecy | Tribal Dreams | Interplay Entertainment | Windows | 1 April 1998 | | |
| Starship Titanic | The Digital Village | Simon & Schuster Interactive | Mac OS, Windows | 2 April 1998 | | |
| Sanitarium | DreamForge Intertainment | ASC Games, Egmont Interactive GmbH, XS Games | Windows | 28 April 1998 | | |
| The X-Files Game | HyperBole Studios | Fox Interactive | Windows, PlayStation | June 1998 | | |
| Hopkins FBI | MP Entertainment | MP Entertainment | OS/2 Warp, Windows, Linux | 16 July 1998 | | |
| Ring: The Legend of the Nibelungen | Arxel Tribe | Red Orb Entertainment, Cryo Interactive | Windows | October 1998 | | |
| Grim Fandango | LucasArts | LucasArts | Windows | 30 October 1998 | | |
| Red Comrades Save the Galaxy | S.K.I.F., Buka Entertainment; Eltechs (Android porting) | Buka Entertainment | Original; Windows; Reloaded macOS, iOS, Microsoft Windows, Android, Linux | November 1998 | Reloaded released on February 18, 2016 | |
| Nancy Drew: Secrets Can Kill | Her Interactive | Her Interactive, DreamCatcher Interactive, Mindscape Asia Pacific | Windows | 5 November 1998 | | |
| John Saul's Blackstone Chronicles: An Adventure in Terror | Legend Entertainment | Red Orb Entertainment | Windows 95/98 | 13 November 1998 | | |
| Juggernaut | Tonkin House | Jaleco | PlayStation | 19 November 1998 | | |
| King's Quest: Mask of Eternity | Sierra Studios | Sierra Entertainment | Windows | 24 November 1998 | | |
| Dark Side of the Moon: A Sci-Fi Adventure | SouthPeak Games | SouthPeak Games | Windows | 30 November 1998 | | |
| Quest for Glory V: Dragon Fire | Sierra On-Line | Sierra On-Line | Windows, Macintosh | 7 December 1998 | | |
| Paris 1313 | Dramæra | Index+, Réunion des Musées Nationaux | Windows | 1999 | | |
| Physicus | HEUREKA-Klett Softwareverlag | Ruske & Puhretmaier Edutainment | Windows, Macintosh | 1999 | | |
| Biosys | JumpStart Solutions Ltd. | Take-Two Interactive | Windows | 28 February 1999 | | |
| Zero Critical | Istvan Pely Productions | Bethesda Softworks | Windows, Mac OS | March 1999 | | |
| Beavis and Butt-Head Do U. | The Illusions Gaming Company | GT Interactive | Windows | 7 March 1999 | | |
| Amerzone | Microïds | Casterman, Ubisoft | Windows, PlayStation, iOS, OS X | 18 March 1999 | | |
| Shadowgate 64: Trials of the Four Towers | TNS Co., Ltd., Infinite Ventures | Kemco | Nintendo 64 | 31 May 1999 | | |
| Discworld Noir | Perfect Entertainment, Teeny Weeny Games (PS) | GT Interactive | Windows, PlayStation | June 1999 | | |
| Traitors Gate | Daydream Software | Daydream Software | Windows, Macintosh | September 1999 | | |
| Dracula: Resurrection | Index+, Canal+ Multimedia and France Telecom Multimedia | Microids | Windows, PlayStation, iOS | October 1999 | | |
| Faust | Arxel Tribe | Cryo Interactive | Windows | October 1999 | Also known as Seven Games of the Soul in North America | |
| The Silver Case | Grasshopper Manufacture | ASCII Entertainment, Nippon Ichi Software, Playism | PlayStation, Windows, macOS, PlayStation 4, Linux, Nintendo Switch | 7 October 1999 | | |
| Spy Fox 2: "Some Assembly Required" | Humongous Entertainment | GT Interactive | Windows, Macintosh | 26 October 1999 | | |
| Omikron: The Nomad Soul | Quantic Dream | Eidos Interactive | Windows, Dreamcast | 31 October 1999 | | |
| Atlantis II | Cryo Interactive | Cryo Interactive, DreamCatcher Interactive | Windows, Mac OS | November 1999 | Also known as Beyond Atlantis in North America | |
| Aztec: The Curse in the Heart of the City of Gold | Cryo Interactive | France Telecom Multimedia | Windows, PlayStation | November 1999 | Also known as The Sacred Amulet | |
| Freddi Fish 4: The Case of the Hogfish Rustlers of Briny Gulch | Humongous Entertainment | Infogrames | Windows, Macintosh | 5 November 1999 | | |
| The Forgotten: It Begins | Ransom Interactive | DreamCatcher Interactive | Windows, Mac OS | 12 November 1999 | | |
| Nancy Drew: Stay Tuned for Danger | Her Interactive | DreamCatcher Games | Windows | 13 November 1999 | | |
| The Longest Journey | Funcom | various local publishers/distributors | Windows | 18 November 1999 | | |
| Gabriel Knight 3: Blood of the Sacred, Blood of the Damned | Sierra On-Line | Sierra On-Line | Windows | 19 November 1999 | | |
| The Crystal Key | Earthlight Productions | DreamCatcher Interactive, The Adventure Company | Windows, Mac OS | 22 November 1999 | | |
| Star Trek: Hidden Evil | Presto Studios | Activision | Microsoft Windows | 22 November 1999 | Contains some shooter elements | |
| Tony Tough and the Night of Roasted Moths | Nayma Software, Prograph Research S.r.l. | Protonic Interactive, Got Game Entertainment LLC, dtp entertainment AG | Windows | 1 December 1999 | Designed by Stefano Gualeni, it was released in North America on October the 31st, 2002. | |
| Cookie's Bustle | Rodik | Rodik | Windows, Macintosh | 9 December 1999 | | |
| Scooby-Doo! Mystery of the Fun Park Phantom | Engineering Animation, Inc. | SouthPeak Games | Windows | 28 December 1999 | | |

== 2000s ==
Notable graphic adventure games of the 2000s
| Game | Developer | Publisher | System | Date released | Notes | Game engine |
|---|---|---|---|---|---|---|
| 20,000 Leagues: The Adventure Continues | Orbital Studios | SouthPeak Games | Windows | 2000 | Unreleased | |
| Egypt II: The Heliopolis Prophecy | Cryo Interactive | Cryo Interactive | Windows, Mac OS | 2000 | | |
| Gold and Glory: The Road to El Dorado | Revolution Software | Ubisoft | Windows, Sony PlayStation | 2000 | Based on Road to El Dorado | |
| The Legend of the Prophet and the Assassin | Arxel Tribe | Arxel Tribe | Microsoft Windows, Mac OS | 2000 | | |
| The Messenger | Canal+ Multimedia, Index+ | DreamCatcher Interactive, Microïds | Windows, Mac OS, PlayStation | 2000 | Original title Louvre: L'Ultime Malédiction | |
| Opsys | Lemon Interactive | [hyper]media limited | Windows, Macintosh | 2000 | | |
| Pajama Sam 3: You Are What You Eat from Your Head to Your Feet | Humongous Entertainment | Runecraft | Windows, Mac OS, PlayStation, iOS, Android | 2000 | | |
| Panty Raider: From Here to Immaturity | Hypnotix | Simon & Schuster Interactive | Windows | 2000 | | |
| Pompei: The Legend of Vesuvius | Cryo Interactive | Arxel Tribe | Windows, Macintosh | 2000 | | |
| Clue Chronicles: Fatal Illusion | EAI Interactive | Hasbro Interactive | Windows | 31 January 2000 | Also known as Cluedo Chronicles: Fatal Illusion in Europe | |
| Myst: Masterpiece Edition | Cyan | Red Orb Entertainment, Mindscape, Cyan | Windows, Mac OS | May 2000 | Remake | |
| Putt-Putt Joins the Circus | Humongous Entertainment | Infogrames | Microsoft Windows, Mac OS | 19 June 2000 | | |
| In Cold Blood | Revolution Software | Sony Computer Entertainment, Ubisoft, DreamCatcher | Windows, PlayStation | 14 July 2000 | | |
| The New Adventures of the Time Machine | Cryo Interactive | DreamCatcher Interactive | Windows | 29 August 2000 | | |
| Dracula 2: The Last Sanctuary | Wanadoo Edition, Canal+ Multimedia | Cryo Interactive | Windows, PlayStation, iOS, OS X | 25 September 2000 | | |
| Odyssey: The Search for Ulysses | Cryo Interactive | Cryo Interactive, DreamCatcher Interactive | Windows | 14 October 2000 | | |
| Escape from Monkey Island | LucasArts | LucasArts | Windows, Mac OS, PlayStation 2 | 8 November 2000 | | |
| Necronomicon: The Dawning of Darkness | Wanadoo Edition, Cryo Interactive | DreamCatcher, The Adventure Company | Windows, PlayStation | 10 November 2000 | | |
| realMyst: Interactive 3D Edition | Cyan, Sunsoft | Mattel Interactive, Macplay, Cyan, Ubisoft | Windows, Mac OS, OS X, iPad | 15 November 2000 | Remake | Plasma |
| Nancy Drew: Message in a Haunted Mansion | Her Interactive | DreamCatcher | Windows, Game Boy Advance | 24 November 2000 | | |
| Clever & Smart - A Movie Adventure | Alcachofa Soft | Alcachofa Soft | Windows | December 2000 | | |
| Riddle of the Sphinx: An Egyptian Adventure | Omni Creative Group | DreamCatcher Interactive | Microsoft Windows, Mac OS | 5 December 2000 | | |
| Stupid Invaders | Xilam | Ubi Soft | Dreamcast, Mac OS, Windows | 15 December 2000 | | |
| Blood: The Last Vampire | Production I.G., Sony Computer Entertainment | Sony Computer Entertainment | PlayStation 2, PlayStation Portable | 21 December 2000 | | |
| Road to India | Microïds | Microïds | Windows | 2001 | Also known as Road to India: Between Hell and Nirvana | Virtools |
| Shadow of Memories | Konami Computer Entertainment Tokyo, Runecraft | Konami | Windows, PlayStation 2, Xbox, PlayStation Portable | 22 February 2001 | Also known as Shadow of Destiny | |
| Hamtaro: Ham-Hams Unite! | Pax Softnica | Nintendo | Game Boy Color | 21 April 2001 | | |
| Myst III: Exile | Presto Studios | Ubisoft | Mac OS, Windows, Xbox, PlayStation 2 | 7 May 2001 | | |
| Gilbert Goodmate and the Mushroom of Phungoria | Prelusion Inc. | ClearWater Interactive | Windows | 8 June 2001 | | |
| Passage: Path of Betrayal | DragonWorks Interactive | DragonWorks Interactive | Windows | July 2001 | | |
| Runaway: A Road Adventure | Péndulo Studios, S.L. | Dinamic Multimedia, FX Interactive | Windows | 6 July 2001 | | |
| Nancy Drew: Treasure in the Royal Tower | Her Interactive | DreamCatcher | Windows | 1 August 2001 | | |
| Dragon Riders: Chronicles of Pern | Ubisoft | Ubisoft | Windows, Dreamcast | 8 August 2001 | | Ubisoft proprietary engine |
| Schizm: Mysterious Journey | LK Avalon, Detalion | LK Avalon, The Adventure Company, DreamCatcher Interactive, P3i Project Three Interactive BV | Windows | 5 September 2001 | | |
| The Mystery of the Druids | House of Tales Entertainment | cdv Software Entertainment | Windows | 14 September 2001 | | |
| Atlantis III: The New World | Cryo Interactive | Cryo Interactive, DreamCatcher Interactive, Microïds | Windows 98/ME/XP, PlayStation 2, iOS | 26 September 2001 | Also known as Beyond Atlantis II in USA | |
| Phoenix Wright: Ace Attorney | Capcom Production Studio 4 | Capcom | Game Boy Advance, Nintendo DS, Windows, Wii, iOS, Android, Nintendo 3DS, Nintendo Switch, PlayStation 4, Xbox One | 12 October 2001 | | |
| Nancy Drew: The Final Scene | Her Interactive | DreamCatcher | Windows | November 2001 | | |
| The Cameron Files: Secret at Loch Ness | Galilea | Wanadoo Edition | Windows | 16 November 2001 | | |
| Simon the Sorcerer 3D | Headfirst Productions | Adventure Soft | Windows | 2002 | | |
| Syberia | Microïds | Microïds, 1C, The Adventure Company, Typhoon Games, ChinaAVG, Mindscape, Dreamcatcher Interactive | Windows, PlayStation 2, Xbox, iOS, Nintendo DS, Smartphones | 9 January 2002 | | Virtools |
| Dark Fall | XXv Productions now Darkling Room | XXv Productions, The Adventure Company | Windows | April 2002(WW) | | |
| The Secret of the Nautilus | Cryo Interactive | Dreamcatcher Interactive, Cryo Interactive | Windows | 29 April 2002 | | |
| RHEM | Knut Müller | Got Game Entertainment, Micro Application | Windows, Mac OS | August 2002 | | |
| Nancy Drew: Secret of the Scarlet Hand | Her Interactive | DreamCatcher Interactive | Windows | 12 August 2002 | | |
| Law & Order: Dead on the Money | Legacy Interactive | Legacy Interactive, The Adventure Company, Aspyr Media | Windows, OS X | 24 September 2002 | | |
| Phoenix Wright: Ace Attorney – Justice for All | Capcom Production Studio 4 | Capcom | Game Boy Advance, Windows, Nintendo DS, Wii, Android, iOS, Nintendo 3DS, Nintendo Switch, PlayStation 4, Xbox One | 18 October 2002 | | |
| The Cameron Files: Pharaoh's Curse | Galilea | The Adventure Company | Windows | 29 October 2002 | | |
| Nancy Drew: Ghost Dogs of Moon Lake | Her Interactive | DreamCatcher Interactive | Windows | November 2002 | | |
| Salammbo: Battle for Carthage | Cryo Interactive | The Adventure Company | Windows | November 2002 | | |
| Post Mortem | Microïds | Microïds, The Adventure Company, Dreamcatcher Interactive | Windows | 18 November 2002 | | Virtools |
| Vandell: Knight of the Tortured Souls | Atmosphere Studios | Blackstar Interactive | Windows | December 2002 | | [unknown] |
| Sherlock Holmes: The Mystery of the Mummy | Frogwares | Wanadoo, The Adventure Company | Windows, Nintendo DS | 29 December 2002 | Part 1 of the Adventures of Sherlock Holmes series | |
| Samorost | Jakub Dvorský | Amanita Design | Browser game | 2003 | | |
| The Black Mirror | Future Games | The Adventure Company, Future Games, GMX Media | Windows | 15 March 2003 | | AGDS |
| The Omega Stone | Omni Creative | DreamCatcher Interactive | Windows | 19 March 2003 | | |
| CSI: Crime Scene Investigation | 369 Interactive, EPCConnect | Ubisoft, Aspyr | Windows, OS X, Xbox | 25 March 2003 | | |
| The Sydney Mystery | Twilight Software | Twilight Software | Windows | 10 April 2003 | | |
| The Adventures of Fatman | SOCKO! Entertainment | SOCKO! Entertainment | Windows, Linux | 10 May 2003 | | |
| Conspiracies | Anima Interactive | Got Game Entertainment, GMX Media | Windows | 1 July 2003 | | |
| Apprentice | Herculean Effort Productions | Herculean Effort Productions | Windows, Linux | 10 July 2003 | | |
| Nancy Drew: The Haunted Carousel | Her Interactive | DreamCatcher | Windows | 22 August 2003 | | |
| AGON: Episode 1 - London Scene | Private Moon Studios | Private Moon Studios | Windows | September 2003 | | |
| 5 Days a Stranger | Ben Croshaw | Ben Croshaw | Windows, Linux | 23 September 2003 | | |
| Law & Order: Double or Nothing | Legacy Interactive | Legacy Interactive, The Adventure Company | Windows | 1 October 2003 | | |
| Nancy Drew: Danger on Deception Island | Her Interactive | DreamCatcher | Windows | 3 October 2003 | | |
| In Memoriam | Lexis Numérique | Ubisoft, The Adventure Company | Windows, OS X | 16 October 2003 | Also known as Missing: Since January in the US | |
| Journey to the Center of the Earth | Frogwares | Viva Media | Windows | 16 October 2003 | | |
| Glass Rose | Cing, Capcom Production Studios 3 | Capcom | PlayStation 2 | 6 November 2003 | | |
| Uru: Ages Beyond Myst | Cyan Worlds | Ubisoft | Windows | 11 November 2003 | | Plasma |
| Broken Sword III: The Sleeping Dragon | Revolution Software | THQ, The Adventure Company, Marvelous Entertainment | Windows, Xbox, PlayStation 2 | 14 November 2003 | Part 3 of the Broken Sword series | |
| Mysterious Journey II | Detalion | The Adventure Company | Windows 98/2000/ME/XP/7 | 24 November 2003 | Also known as Schizm II: Chameleon | |
| Full Pipe (Total Flush) | Pipe Studio | 1C Company, Daedalic Entertainment | Microsoft Windows | 28 November 2003 | | |
| The Westerner | Revistronic | Planeta DeAgostini | Windows | 21 December 2003 | Also known as Wanted: A Wild Western Adventure in North America | |
| CSI: Miami | 369 Interactive, Gameloft | Ubisoft, Gameloft | Windows, iOS | 2004 | | |
| Phoenix Wright: Ace Attorney – Trials and Tribulations | Capcom Production Studio 4 | Capcom | Game Boy Advance, Windows, Nintendo DS, Wii, Android, iOS, Nintendo 3DS, Nintendo Switch, PlayStation 4, Xbox One | 23 January 2004 | | |
| Jack the Ripper | Galilea Games | The Adventure Company | Windows | 29 January 2004 | | Virtools |
| Crystal Key 2 | Earthlight Productions, Kheops Studio | The Adventure Company | Microsoft Windows, Mac OS | 17 March 2004 | | |
| CSI: Dark Motives | 369 Interactive, Powerhead Games | Ubisoft | Windows, Nintendo DS | 23 March 2004 | | |
| Egypt III: The Egyptian Prophecy | Kheops Studio | The Adventure Company | Windows, Windows Mobile | 30 March 2004 | | |
| Syberia II | MC2-Microids | XS Games, LLC | Windows, Xbox, PlayStation 2, Windows Mobile | 30 March 2004 | | Virtools |
| Cirque de Zale | Rebecca Clements | Rebecca Clements | Windows | April 2004 | | |
| Aura: Fate of the Ages | Streko-Graphics Inc. | The Adventure Company | Windows | 24 June 2004 | | |
| 7 Days a Skeptic | Ben Croshaw | Ben Croshaw | Windows, Linux | 22 July 2004 | | |
| Dark Fall II: Lights Out | XXv Productions | The Adventure Company, Darkling Room, Iceberg Interactive | Windows | 26 August 2004 | | |
| Secret of the Silver Earring | Frogwares | Digital Jesters, Ubisoft | Wii, Windows | 27 August 2004 | Part 2 of the Adventures of Sherlock Holmes series | |
| Nancy Drew: The Secret of Shadow Ranch | Her Interactive | DreamCatcher | Windows | 30 August 2004 | | |
| Myst IV: Revelation | Ubisoft Montreal | Ubisoft | Windows, OS X, Xbox | 30 September 2004 | | |
| The Moment of Silence | House of Tales | Digital Jesters, The Adventure Company | Windows | 1 October 2004 | | |
| Nancy Drew: Curse of Blackmoor Manor | Her Interactive | DreamCatcher | Windows | 5 October 2004 | | |
| Atlantis: Evolution | Atlantis Interactive Entertainment | The Adventure Company | Windows | 15 October 2004 | | |
| Return to Mysterious Island | Kheops Studio | The Adventure Company | Windows, Windows Mobile, OS X, iOS | November 2004 | | |
| Legacy: Dark Shadows | Razbor Studios | GMX Media | Windows | 29 November 2004 | | |
| Martin Mystère: Operation Dorian Gray | Artematica | The Adventure Company, GMX Media | Windows | December 2004(IT) | Also known as Crime Stories in the US | |
| Another Code: Two Memories | Cing | Nintendo | Nintendo DS | 24 February 2005 | Also known as Trace Memory in the US | |
| Nibiru: Age of Secrets | Future Games | The Adventure Company | Windows | 11 March 2005 | | AGDS |
| The White Chamber | Studio Trophis | Studio Trophis | Windows, OS X | 31 March 2005 | | |
| Still Life | Microids | MC2, The Adventure Company | Windows, Xbox | 15 April 2005 | | Virtools |
| RHEM 2: The Cave | Knut Müller | Got Game Entertainment, Virtual Programming | Windows | June 2005 | | |
| Lula 3D | cdv Software Entertainment | cdv Software Entertainment | Windows | 22 June 2005 | | |
| Echo: Secrets of the Lost Cavern | Kheops Studio | The Adventure Company, Coladia Games | Windows, OS X, iOS, Windows Mobile | 5 July 2005 | | |
| Nancy Drew: Secret of the Old Clock | Her Interactive | DreamCatcher | Windows | 12 July 2005 | | |
| Voyage: Inspired by Jules Verne | Kheops Studio | The Adventure Company | Windows | 15 August 2005 | Also known as Journey to the Moon in the UK | |
| Bone: Out From Boneville | Telltale Games | Telltale Games, Xider Games | Windows | 15 September 2005 | | Telltale Tool |
| Nancy Drew: Last Train to Blue Moon Canyon | Her Interactive | DreamCatcher | Windows | 15 September 2005 | | |
| Fahrenheit | Quantic Dream | Atari | Windows, PlayStation 2, Xbox 360, OS X | 16 September 2005 | Also known as Indigo Prophecy in the US | |
| Myst V: End of Ages | Cyan Worlds | Ubisoft | Windows, OS X | 20 September 2005 | | Plasma |
| Agatha Christie: And Then There Were None | AWE Productions | The Adventure Company | Windows, Wii | 27 October 2005 | | |
| 80 Days | Frogwares | Focus Entertainment, Tri Synergy | Windows | 4 November 2005 | | [unknown] |
| Ankh | Deck13 Interactive | BHV Software | Windows, Linux, OS X | 4 November 2005 | Initially released in Germany | |
| Samorost 2 | Jakub Dvorský | Amanita Design | Windows, OS X, Linux | 8 December 2005 | | |
| Al Emmo and the Lost Dutchman's Mine | Himalaya Studios | Himalaya Studios | Windows | 2006 | | |
| Ankh: Heart of Osiris | Deck13 Interactive | BHV Software | Windows, Linux, OS X | 2006 | | |
| The Blackwell Legacy | Wadjet Eye Games | Wadjet Eye Games | Windows | 2006 | | |
| Bone: The Great Cow Race | Telltale Games | Telltale Games, Xider Games | Windows | 2006 | | Telltale Tool |
| Intrigue at Oakhaven Plantation | Cindy Pondillo | Cindy Pondillo | Windows | 2006 | | AGS engine |
| Keepsake | Wicked Studios | The Adventure Company, Lighthouse Interactive | Windows | 2006 | | |
| Paradise | White Birds Productions | Micro Application, Ubisoft | Windows, iOS, Nintendo DS | 2006 | | |
| Scratches | Nucleosys | Got Game Entertainment | Windows | 2006 | | SCream (Simple Creation Engine for Adventure Makers) |
| The Shivah | Wadjet Eye Games | Wadjet Eye Games | Windows | 2006 | | |
| Tony Tough 2: A Rake's Progress | Stefano Gualeni | dtp entertainment | Windows | 2006 | | |
| CSI: 3 Dimensions of Murder | Telltale Games | Ubisoft | Windows, PlayStation 2 | 14 March 2006 | | Telltale Tool |
| Barrow Hill: Curse of the Ancient Circle | Shadow Tor Studios | Shadow Tor Studios, Lighthouse Interactive, Got Game Entertainment, Akella | Windows | 16 April 2006 | | |
| Dreamfall: The Longest Journey | Funcom | Aspyr Media, Micro Application, Empire Interactive | Windows, Xbox, Xbox 360 | 17 April 2006 | | |
| Trilby's Notes | Ben Croshaw | Ben Croshaw | Windows, Linux | 26 June 2006 | | |
| Nancy Drew: Danger By Design | Her Interactive | DreamCatcher | Windows | 24 July 2006 | | |
| Broken Sword IV: The Angel of Death | Sumo Digital, Revolution Software | THQ, DreamCatcher Interactive | Windows | 15 September 2006 | Part 4 of the Broken Sword series | |
| In Memoriam 2 | Lexis Numérique | Ubisoft, The Adventure Company | Windows | 21 September 2006 | Also known as Evidence: The Last Ritual in the US | |
| Secret Files: Tunguska | Fusionsphere Systems, Animation Arts | Dreamcatcher Interactive, The Adventure Company, Deep Silver | Windows, Wii, Nintendo DS | 26 September 2006 | Part 1 of the Secret Files series | |
| Undercover: Operation Wintersun | Sproing Interactive Media | Lighthouse Interactive | Windows, Linux, OS X | 29 September 2006 | | |
| Yoomurjak's Ring | Private Moon Studios | Private Moon Studios | Windows | October 2006 | | |
| Nancy Drew: The Creature of Kapu Cave | Her Interactive | DreamCatcher | Windows | 1 October 2006 | | |
| The Secrets of Atlantis: The Sacred Legacy | Atlantis Interactive Entertainment | Nobilis | Windows | 3 November 2006 | | |
| Agatha Christie: Murder on the Orient Express | AWE Productions | The Adventure Company | Windows | 14 November 2006 | | |
| The Awakened | Frogwares | Focus Home Interactive | Windows | 24 November 2006 | Part 3 of the Adventures of Sherlock Holmes series | |
| Ankh: Battle of the Gods | Deck13 Interactive | BHV Software | Windows, OS X | 2007 | | |
| Aura II: The Sacred Rings | Streko-Graphics Inc. | The Adventure Company | Windows | 2007 | | Virtools |
| Blackwell Unbound | Wadjet Eye Games | Wadjet Eye Games | Windows | 2007 | | |
| Culpa Innata | Momentum DMT | Strategy First | Windows | 2007 | | |
| Dream Chronicles | KatGames | PlayFirst | Windows, iOS, OS X, Xbox Live Arcade, PlayStation Network, Nintendo DS, Mobile, Online | 2007 | | |
| Hotel Dusk: Room 215 | Cing | Nintendo | Nintendo DS | 2007 | | |
| Jack Keane | Deck13 Interactive | 10tacle Studios, Strategy First, RuneSoft | Windows, Linux, OS X | 2007 | | |
| Overclocked: A History of Violence | House of Tales | Lighthouse Interactive | Windows | 2007 | | |
| Penumbra: Overture | Frictional Games | Paradox Interactive | Windows, Linux, OS X | 2007 | | HPL Engine |
| Runaway 2: The Dream of The Turtle | Péndulo Studios, S.L., Cyanide, 93 Games Studio | Focus Home Interactive, FX Interactive | Windows, Wii, Nintendo DS | 2007 | | |
| Sam & Max: Season Two | Telltale Games | Telltale Games, GameTap, Atari | Windows, Xbox Live Arcade, Wii, OS X, PlayStation Network, iOS | 2007 | | Telltale Tool |
| Simon the Sorcerer 4: Chaos Happens | Silver Style Entertainment | RTL Enterprises, Playlogic Entertainment | Windows | 2007 | | |
| Sinking Island | White Birds Productions | Microids/Encore, Micro Application | Windows | 2007 | | |
| 6 Days a Sacrifice | Ben Croshaw | Ben Croshaw | Windows, Linux | 25 January 2007 | | |
| Destination Treasure Island | Kheops Studio | Nobilis | Windows, OS X | February 2007 | | |
| Nelly Cootalot: Spoonbeaks Ahoy! | Alasdair Beckett | Alasdair Beckett | Windows | 6 March 2007 | | |
| Apollo Justice: Ace Attorney | Capcom | Capcom | Nintendo DS, iOS, Android, Nintendo 3DS | 12 April 2007 | | |
| Sam & Max: Season One | Telltale Games | The Adventure Company, JoWood Productions | Windows, Wii, Xbox 360 | 18 May 2007 | | Telltale Tool |
| Nancy Drew: The White Wolf of Icicle Creek | Her Interactive | Her Interactive, Sega (Wii) | Windows, Wii | 7 June 2007 | | proprietary engine |
| Dead Reefs | Streko-Graphics Inc. | The Adventure Company | Windows | 29 June 2007 | | Virtools |
| A Tale of Two Kingdoms | Crystal Shard | Crystal Shard | Windows | 15 July 2007 | | |
| Jake Hunter: Detective Chronicles | WorkJam | Arc System Works, Aksys Games | Nintendo DS | 19 July 2007 | | |
| Fate by Numbers | Revival | Revival | Windows | 30 July 2007 | | |
| Next Life | Future Games | The Adventure Company | Windows | 14 September 2007 | | |
| eXperience112 | Lexis Numérique | Micro Application, The Adventure Company | Windows | 17 September 2007 | Also known as The Experiment | |
| CSI: Hard Evidence | Telltale Games | Ubisoft | Windows, OS X, Xbox 360, Wii | 25 September 2007 | | Telltale Tool |
| Limbo of the Lost | Majestic Studios | Tri Synergy, G2 Games | Windows | 28 September 2007 | | Wintermute Engine |
| Agatha Christie: Evil Under the Sun | AWE Productions | The Adventure Company | Windows, Wii | 16 October 2007 | | |
| RHEM 3: The Secret Library | Knut Müller | Got Game Entertainment, Micro Application | Windows, Mac OS | 21 October 2007 | | |
| Sherlock Holmes Versus Arsène Lupin | Frogwares | Focus Home Interactive | Windows | 25 October 2007 | Part 4 of the Adventures of Sherlock Holmes series | |
| Darkness Within: In Pursuit of Loath Nolder | Zoetrope Interactive | Lighthouse Interactive, Iceberg Interactive | Windows, OnLive | 6 November 2007 | | |
| Dracula: Origin | Frogwares | Focus Home Interactive, The Adventure Company, 93GAMES | Windows | 2008 | | |
| Dream Chronicles 2: The Eternal Maze | KatGames | PlayFirst | Windows, OS X, iOS | 2008 | | |
| Penumbra: Black Plague | Frictional Games | Paradox Interactive | Windows, OS X, Linux | 2008 | | HPL Engine |
| Penumbra: Requiem | Frictional Games | Paradox Interactive | Windows, Linux, OS X | 2008 | | HPL Engine |
| Strong Bad's Cool Game for Attractive People | Telltale Games | Telltale Games, Nintendo | Windows, Wii, PlayStation 3 | 2008 | | Telltale Tool |
| Time Hollow | Tenky | Konami | Nintendo DS | 2008 | | |
| A Vampyre Story | Autumn Moon Entertainment | Crimson Cow, The Adventure Company | Windows, OS X | 2008 | | |
| Art of Murder: FBI Confidential | City Interactive | dtp entertainment | Windows | 11 January 2008 | | |
| The Immortals of Terra: A Perry Rhodan Adventure | 3D-IO Games | BrainGame Publishing, Deep Silver | Windows | 29 February 2008 | | |
| The Lost Crown: A Ghost-Hunting Adventure | Darkling Room, Shadow Tor Studios | Got Game Entertainment, Akella, Mamba Games | Windows | 3 March 2008 | | |
| So Blonde | Wizarbox | Eidos Interactive, ANACONDA | Windows | 14 March 2008 | | |
| The Void | Ice-Pick Lodge | ND Games, Mamba Games, Techland, Atari | Windows | 17 April 2008 | | |
| Zak McKracken: Between Time and Space | Artificial Hair Bros. | Artificial Hair Bros. | Windows | 18 April 2008 | Fan adventure of Zak McKracken and the Alien Mindbenders, Freeware | Visionaire |
| Goin' Downtown | Silver Style Entertainment | The Games Company | Windows | 22 May 2008 | | |
| Edna & Harvey: The Breakout | Daedalic Entertainment | Daedalic Entertainment, Xider Games | Windows, OS X, iPad | 6 June 2008 | | |
| Belief & Betrayal | Artematica | Lighthouse Interactive | Windows | 20 June 2008 | | |
| Kara no Shōjo | Innocent Grey | Innocent Grey, MangaGamer | Windows | 4 July 2008 | | |
| Ben There, Dan That | Zombie Cow Studios | Zombie Cow Studios | Windows | 12 July 2008 | | |
| Tale of a Hero | Future Games | Noviy Disk | Windows | 24 July 2008 | | AGDS |
| Azada: Ancient Magic | Big Fish Studios | Big Fish Games | Windows, OS X | August 2008 | | |
| Dracula 3: The Path of the Dragon | Kheops Studio | Microids, Encore Games (US) | Windows, iOS, OS X, OnLive | 21 August 2008 | | |
| Outcry | Phantomery Interactive | The Adventure Company | Windows | 26 August 2008 | | |
| Amazing Adventures Around the World | SpinTop Games | PopCap Games Inc. | Windows, iPad | 17 September 2008 | | |
| Nikopol: Secrets of the Immortals | White Birds Productions | Got Game Entertainment | Windows, OnLive | 25 September 2008 | | |
| The Hardy Boys: The Hidden Theft | XPEC Entertainment | DreamCatcher Games | Windows, Wii | 30 September 2008 | | |
| Casebook | Areo Cinematic Games | Big Fish Games | Windows | 27 October 2008 | | |
| Memento Mori | Centauri Production | Cinemax, dtp entertainment, Lace Mamba Global, Got Game Entertainment, Akella | Windows | 31 October 2008 | | |
| Chronicles of Mystery: The Scorpio Ritual | City Interactive | City Interactive | Windows | 10 November 2008 | | |
| Mata Hari | 4HEAD Studios | Viva Media | Windows | 21 November 2008 | | |
| 428: Shibuya Scramble | Chunsoft | Spike Chunsoft | Wii, PlayStation 3, PlayStation Portable, iOS, Android, PlayStation 4, Windows | 4 December 2008 | | |
| A Second Face | Jospin Le Woltaire | Jospin Le Woltaire | Windows | 23 December 2008 | | |
| Another Code: R – A Journey into Lost Memories | Cing | Nintendo | Wii | 5 February 2009 | | |
| Art of Murder: Hunt for the Puppeteer | City Interactive | City Interactive | Windows | 17 February 2009 | | |
| Ceville | Realmforge Studios | Kalypso Media | Windows, OnLive | 17 February 2009 | | |
| Emerald City Confidential | Wadjet Eye Games | PlayFirst | Windows, OS X | 19 February 2009 | | |
| Art of Murder: Cards of Destiny | City Interactive | City Interactive | Windows | 23 February 2009 | | |
| The Path | Tale of Tales | Tale of Tales, TransGaming, TopWare, 1C Company, Zoo Corporation | Windows, OS X | 18 March 2009 | | |
| Wallace and Gromit's Grand Adventures | Telltale Games | Telltale Games | Windows, Xbox Live Arcade, iOS | 23 March 2009 | | Telltale Tool |
| Simon the Sorcerer: Who'd Even Want Contact?! | Silver Style Entertainment | The Games Company | Windows | 26 March 2009 | | |
| The Book of Unwritten Tales | King Art | HMH Interactive, Crimson Cow, Lace Mamba Global | Windows, OS X, iOS | 2 April 2009 | | |
| Still Life 2 | Gameco Studios | Microïds, Encore Games, cdv Software Entertainment | Windows, OS X | 3 April 2009 | | |
| Dream Chronicles: The Chosen Child | KatGames | PlayFirst | Windows, OS X, iOS | 16 April 2009 | | |
| Sherlock Holmes Versus Jack the Ripper | Frogwares | Focus Home Interactive | Xbox 360, Windows | 30 April 2009 | Part 5 of the Adventures of Sherlock Holmes series | |
| Secret Files 2: Puritas Cordis | Fusionsphere Systems, Animation Arts, Keen Games | Deep Silver | Windows, Wii, Nintendo DS | 8 May 2009 | Part 2 of the Secret Files series | |
| Ace Attorney Investigations: Miles Edgeworth | Capcom | Capcom, THQ | Nintendo DS | 28 May 2009 | | |
| Time Gentlemen, Please! | Zombie Cow Studios | Zombie Cow Studios | Windows | 22 June 2009 | | |
| Treasure World | Aspyr | Aspyr | Nintendo DS | 2 July 2009 | Innovative handheld game by its use of Wi-Fi signals to locate stardust and treasures in-game. | |
| Tales of Monkey Island | Telltale Games | LucasArts | Windows, Wii, OS X, PlayStation 3, iOS | 7 July 2009 | | Telltale Tool |
| The Blackwell Convergence | Wadjet Eye Games | Wadjet Eye Games | Windows | 22 July 2009 | | |
| Ripened Tingle's Balloon Trip of Love | Vanpool | Nintendo | Nintendo DS | 6 August 2009 | Second entry in the Tingle series. Only released in Japan. | |
| Pizza Morgana | Corbomite Games | Corbomite Games | Windows | 16 August 2009 | | |
| The Whispered World | Daedalic Entertainment | Deep Silver, Viva Media | Windows, OS X, Linux, OnLive | 28 August 2009 | | |
| Black Mirror II: Reigning Evil | Cranberry Production | dtp entertainment, Lace Mamba Global | Windows | 25 September 2009 | | |
| Adam's Venture | Vertigo Digital | Soedesco | Windows, PlayStation 3, PlayStation 4, Xbox One, Nintendo Switch | 2 October 2009 | | Unreal Engine 3 |
| Axel & Pixel | Silver Wish Games | 2K Play | Windows, Xbox 360 (XBLA) | 14 October 2009 | | |
| Machinarium | Amanita Design | Amanita Design, Daedalic Entertainment | Windows, OS X, Linux, PlayStation 3 (PSN), PlayStation Vita, iPad 2, BlackBerry PlayBook, Android | 16 October 2009 | | |
| Ghost Pirates of Vooju Island | Autumn Moon Entertainment | dtp entertainment | Windows | 6 November 2009 | | |
| Murder, She Wrote | Legacy Games | Focus Multimedia | Windows, OS X | 12 November 2009 | | |
| Dark Fall: Lost Souls | Darkling Room | Iceberg Interactive | Windows | 13 November 2009 | | Wintermute Engine |
| 15 Days | House of Tales | dtp entertainment | Windows | 20 November 2009 | | |
| Runaway: A Twist of Fate | Péndulo Studios, S.L. | Focus Home Interactive | Windows, Nintendo DS | 26 November 2009 | | |
| Nine Hours, Nine Persons, Nine Doors | Chunsoft | Spike (company), Aksys Games | Nintendo DS, iOS, PlayStation 4, PlayStation Vita, Windows | 10 December 2009 | Part of the Zero Escape series | |
| Again | Cing | Tecmo | Nintendo DS | 10 December 2009 | | |

== 2010s ==
Notable graphic adventure games of the 2010s
| Game | Developer | Publisher | System | Date released | Notes | Game engine |
|---|---|---|---|---|---|---|
| Last Window: The Secret of Cape West | Cing | Nintendo | Nintendo DS | 14 January 2010 | Sequel to Hotel Dusk: Room 215 | |
| Heavy Rain | Quantic Dream | Sony Computer Entertainment | PlayStation 3 | 18 February 2010 | | |
| Alter Ego | Future Games | Viva Media | Windows | 24 March 2010 | | AGDS |
| Sam & Max: Season Three - The Devil's Playhouse | Telltale Games | Telltale Games | Windows, OS X, PlayStation 3, iPad | 2 April 2010 | | Telltale Tool |
| Hamlet, or The Last Game Without MMORPG Features, Shaders and Product Placement | Denis Galanin | Big Fish Games, Alawar Entertainment | Windows, OS X, iOS, Android | 8 April 2010 | | Wintermute Engine |
| Hector: Badge of Carnage | Straandlooper, Telltale Games | Telltale Games | Windows, OS X, iOS | 2 June 2010 | | |
| Doctor Who: The Adventure Games | Sumo Digital | BBC Wales Interactive | Windows, OS X | 5 June 2010 | | |
| Jolly Rover | Brawsome | Brawsome | Windows, OS X, OnLive | 8 June 2010 | | |
| Ghost Trick: Phantom Detective | Capcom | Capcom | Nintendo DS, iOS, Android, Nintendo Switch, PlayStation 4, Windows, Xbox One | 19 June 2010 | | |
| Dream Chronicles: The Book of Air | KatGames | PlayFirst | Windows, OS X, iOS | 24 June 2010 | | |
| Puzzle Agent | Telltale Games | Telltale Games | Windows, OS X, PlayStation Network, iOS | 30 June 2010 | | Telltale Tool |
| RHEM 4: The Golden Fragments | Knut Müller | WHA Entertainment, Micro Application | Windows, OS X | 30 July 2010 | | |
| Lost Horizon | Animation Arts | Deep Silver | Windows | 20 August 2010 | | |
| Nancy Drew: Secrets Can Kill Remastered | Her Interactive | Her Interactive | Windows, OS X | 24 August 2010 | | |
| Amnesia: The Dark Descent | Frictional Games | Frictional Games, RHQ | Windows, OS X, Linux, OnLive | 8 September 2010 | | HPL Engine 2 |
| A New Beginning | Daedalic Entertainment | Daedalic Entertainment, Lace Mamba Global | Windows, OS X | 8 October 2010 | | |
| Gray Matter | Wizarbox | dtp entertainment | Windows, Xbox 360 | 12 November 2010 | | |
| Danganronpa: Trigger Happy Havoc | Spike | NIS America, Spike Chunsoft | PlayStation Portable, Android, iOS, PlayStation Vita, Microsoft Windows, OS X, Linux, PlayStation 4 | 25 November 2010 | | |
| The Dream Machine | Cockroach Inc. | Cockroach Inc. | Windows, OS X | 4 December 2010 | Initial Chapters 1-2 release date | Adobe Flash |
| Back to the Future: The Game | Telltale Games | Telltale Games, Deep Silver | Windows, OS X, PlayStation 3, Wii, iOS | 22 December 2010 | | Telltale Tool |
| Ace Attorney Investigations 2: Prosecutor's Gambit | Capcom | Capcom | Nintendo DS, Android, iOS | 3 February 2011 | | |
| Black Mirror III: Final Fear | Cranberry Production | dtp entertainment | Windows | 4 February 2011 | | |
| The Next Big Thing | Péndulo Studios, S.L. | Crimson Cow | Windows, OS X, iOS | 4 February 2011 | | |
| Stacking | Double Fine Productions | THQ | Windows, Linux, PlayStation 3, Xbox 360, OS X | 8 February 2011 | | |
| Last Half of Darkness: Society of the Serpent Moon | WRF Studios | WRF Studios | Windows | 10 February 2011 | | |
| Catherine | Atlus Persona Team | Atlus, Deep Silver | PlayStation 3, Xbox 360 | 17 February 2011 | | Gamebryo |
| Gemini Rue | Joshua Nuernberger | Wadjet Eye Games | Windows, iOS | 24 February 2011 | | Adventure Game Studio |
| Sissy's Magical Ponycorn Adventure | Untold Entertainment Inc. | Untold Entertainment Inc. | Browser game | 24 May 2011 | | |
| Alpha Polaris | Turmoil Games | Just a Game | Windows | 24 June 2011 | | Wintermute Engine |
| Puzzle Agent 2 | Telltale Games | Telltale Games | Windows, OS X, iOS | 30 June 2011 | | Telltale Tool |
| The Blackwell Deception | Wadjet Eye Games | Wadjet Eye Games | Windows | 12 October 2011 | | |
| To The Moon | Freebird Games | Freebird Games | Windows | 1 November 2011 | | RPG Maker XP |
| Jurassic Park: The Game | Telltale Games | Telltale Games | Windows, OS X, PlayStation 3, Xbox 360 & iOS | 15 November 2011 | | Telltale Tool |
| Metal Dead | Walk Thru Walls Studios | Walk Thru Walls Studios | Windows | 19 December 2011 | | |
| Law & Order: Legacies | Telltale Games | Telltale Games | Windows, OS X, iOS | 22 December 2011 | | Telltale Tool |
| Space Quest: Vohaul Strikes Back | Team VSB | | Windows, Linux, OS X | 22 December 2011 | Freeware fan game | |
| Space Quest: Incinerations | | | Windows, OS X | 11 January 2012 | Freeware fan game | |
| Deponia | Daedalic Entertainment | Daedalic Entertainment | Windows, OS X, Linux iPad PlayStation 4 Nintendo Switch | 27 January 2012 | Part 1 of the Deponia series | |
| Dear Esther | The Chinese Room | The Chinese Room | Windows, OS X, PlayStation 4, Xbox One | 14 February 2012 | First walking simulator | Source |
| Zero Escape: Virtue's Last Reward | Chunsoft | Chunsoft, Aksys Games, Rising Star Games | Nintendo 3DS, PlayStation Vita, PlayStation 4, Windows | 16 February 2012 | Part of the Zero Escape series | |
| Yesterday | Péndulo Studios, S.L. | FX Interactive, Focus Home Interactive | Windows, iOS, Android | 29 March 2012 | | |
| Botanicula | Amanita Design | Amanita Design, Daedalic Entertainment | Windows, OS X, Linux, iOS, Android | 19 April 2012 | | Adobe Flash |
| The Walking Dead | Telltale Games | Telltale Games | Windows, PlayStation 3, Xbox 360, OS X, PlayStation Vita, iOS, Ouya, Nintendo Switch | 24 April 2012 | | Telltale Tool |
| The Journey Down | Skygoblin | Skygoblin | Windows, OS X, Linux, iOS, | 18 May 2012 | Remake of the freeware title | |
| The Sea Will Claim Everything | Jonas & Verena Kyratzes | Jonas Kyratzes | Windows | 23 May 2012 | | |
| Resonance | XXI Games | Wadjet Eye Games | Windows | 19 June 2012 | | |
| Shaban | PetaGame | Big Fish Games | Windows | 20 June 2012 | | |
| The Dark Eye: Chains of Satinav | Daedalic Entertainment | Deep Silver | Windows, OS X | 22 June 2012 | | |
| Danganronpa 2: Goodbye Despair | Spike Chunsoft | NIS America, Spike Chunsoft | PlayStation Portable, PlayStation Vita, Microsoft Windows, OS X, Linux, PlayStation 4 | 26 July 2012 | | |
| Secret Files 3: The Archimedes code | Animation Arts | Deep Silver, Koch Media | Microsoft Windows | 13 September 2012 | Part 3 of the Secret Files Series | |
| Life in the Dorms | Moment Games | Moment Games | Xbox 360 | 14 September 2012 | | |
| The Testament of Sherlock Holmes | Frogwares | Focus Home Interactive, Atlus | Windows, PlayStation 3, Xbox 360 | 20 September 2012 | Part 8 of the Adventures of Sherlock Holmes series | |
| Edna & Harvey: Harvey's New Eyes | Daedalic Entertainment | Daedalic Entertainment | Windows, OS X, Linux | 16 October 2012 | | |
| The Unfinished Swan | Giant Sparrow, Santa Monica Studio | Sony Entertainment (console) Annapurna Interactive (WIndows / iOS) | PlayStation 3, PlayStation 4, PlayStation Vita, Windows, iOS | 23 October 2012 | | Gamebryo |
| Cognition: An Erica Reed Thriller | Phoenix Online Studios | Reverb Publishing | Windows, OS X, iOS | 30 October 2012 | | |
| Chaos on Deponia | Daedalic Entertainment | Daedalic Entertainment | Windows, OS X, Linux, PlayStation 4, Xbox One | 6 November 2012 | Part 2 of the Deponia series | |
| Professor Layton vs. Phoenix Wright: Ace Attorney | Capcom, Level-5 | Level-5 | Nintendo 3DS | 29 November 2012 | | |
| The Cat Lady | Harvester Games | Screen 7 | Windows, Linux | 1 December 2012 | Point & click hybrid | |
| The Book of Unwritten Tales: The Critter Chronicles | KING Art Games | Crimson Cow / Lace Mamba | Windows, OS X, Linux | 5 December 2012 | | |
| Primordia | Wormwood Studios | Wadjet Eye Games | Windows, OS X | 5 December 2012 | | |
| The Silent Age | House on Fire | House on Fire | iOS, Android, Kindle Fire, Windows, Mac | 6 December 2012 | | Unity |
| Waking Mars | Tiger Style | Tiger Style | Windows, OS X, Linux, Android, IOS | 13 December 2012 | | |
| Kentucky Route Zero | Cardboard Computer | Cardboard Computer | Windows, OS X, Linux, Nintendo Switch | 7 January 2013 | Part 1 of a 5-act series | Unity |
| The Cave | Double Fine Productions | Sega | Windows, OS X, Linux, PlayStation 3, Wii U, Xbox 360, iOS, Android | 22 January 2013 | | |
| Richard & Alice | Owl Cave | Owl Cave | Windows | 21 February 2013 | | |
| Driftmoon | Instant Kingdom | Instant Kingdom | Windows, Linux, OS X | 26 February 2013 | | |
| Badland | Frogmind Games | Frogmind Games | Windows, iOS, OS X, Android | 4 April 2013 | | Cocos2d |
| The Night of the Rabbit | Daedalic Entertainment | Daedalic Entertainment | Windows, iOS | 29 May 2013 | | |
| Dracula 4: The Shadow of the Dragon | Koalabs Studio | Anuman | Windows, iOS, OS X, Android | 19 June 2013 | | |
| Mermaid Swamp | Uri | Uri | Windows | 5 July 2013 | | |
| Face Noir | Mad Orange | Phoenix Online Studios | Windows | 18 July 2013 | | Wintermute Engine |
| Phoenix Wright: Ace Attorney – Dual Destinies | Capcom | Capcom | Nintendo 3DS, iOS, Android | 25 July 2013 | | |
| Captain Disaster in: The Dark Side of the Moon | Team Disaster | Team Disaster | Windows | 12 August 2013 | Part 1 of the Captain Disaster series. | |
| The Dark Eye: Memoria | Daedalic Entertainment | Daedalic Entertainment | Windows, OS X | 29 August 2013 | | Visionaire Studio |
| Amnesia: A Machine for Pigs | The Chinese Room | Frictional Games | Windows, Linux, OS X | 10 September 2013 | | HPL Engine 2 |
| The Wolf Among Us | Telltale Games | Telltale Games | Windows, OS X, PlayStation 3, Xbox 360 | 11 October 2013 | | Telltale Tool |
| Goodbye Deponia | Daedalic Entertainment | Daedalic Entertainment | Windows, OS X, Linux, PlayStation 4, Xbox One | 15 October 2013 | Part 3 of the Deponia series | |
| The Stanley Parable | Galactic Cafe | Galactic Cafe | Windows, Linux, OS X | 17 October 2013 | | Source |
| Secret Files 4: Sam Peters | Animation Arts | Deep Silver, Koch Media | Windows, iOS, Android | 18 October 2013 | Part 4 of the Secret Files series | |
| Dream Chamber | DarkWave Games | Microïds | Windows, OS X, Android, iOS | 24 October 2013 | | Unity |
| Lilly Looking Through | Geeta Games | Geeta Games | Windows, OS X | 1 November 2013 | | |
| Broken Sword V: The Serpent's Curse | Revolution Software | Revolution Software | Windows, OS X, Android, iOS, PlayStation Network | 4 December 2013 | Part 5 of the Broken Sword series. Episode 1 - 2013, Episode 2 - 2014. Full ver. 20 June 2014 | Virtual Theatre 7 |
| The Last Door | The Game Kitchen | The Game Kitchen | Android, iOS, Windows, macOS, Linux, Windows Phone, Nintendo Switch, PlayStation 4, Xbox One | 14 December 2013 | | Adobe AIR |
| Broken Age | Double Fine Productions | Double Fine Productions | Windows, OS X, Linux, iOS, Android, Ouya | 28 January 2014 | | Moai |
| realMyst: Masterpiece Edition | Cyan Worlds | Cyan Worlds | Windows, OS X | 5 February 2014 | | |
| Jazzpunk | Necrophone Games | Adult Swim Games | Windows, PlayStation 4 | 7 February 2014 | | Unity |
| The Samaritan Paradox | Faravid Interactive | Screen 7 | Windows | 20 March 2014 | | |
| Ether One | White Paper Games | White Paper Games | Windows, PlayStation 4 | 25 March 2014 | | Unreal Engine 3 (2014) Unreal Engine 4 (Redux) |
| Moebius: Empire Rising | Pinkerton Road Studio | Pinkerton Road Studio | Windows, Linux, OS X, iOS | 15 April 2014 | | |
| Fract OSC | Phosfiend Systems | Phosfiend Systems | Windows, OS X | 22 April 2014 | Has rhythm game elements | Unity |
| The Blackwell Epiphany | Wadjet Eye Games | Wadjet Eye Games | Windows | 24 April 2014 | | Adventure Game Studio |
| Tesla Effect: A Tex Murphy Adventure | Big Finish Games | Big Finish Games | Windows, OS X, Android | 7 May 2014 | Part of the Tex Murphy series | |
| A Story About My Uncle | Gone North Games | Coffee Stain Studios | Windows, Linux, OS X | 28 May 2014 | | Unreal Engine 3 |
| Among the Sleep | Krillbite Studio | Krillbite Studio | Windows, OS X, PlayStation 4, Xbox One | 29 May 2014 | | Unity |
| Lifeless Planet | Stage 2 Studios | Lace Games (PC), Serenity Forge, Stage 2 Studios (consoles) | Windows, OS X, PlayStation 4, Xbox One | 6 June 2014 | | Unity |
| Whispering Willows | Night Light Interactive | Night Light Interactive | Windows, OS X, Linux, PlayStation 4, Xbox One, iOS, Android, Nintendo Switch | 9 July 2014 | | Unity |
| Quest for Infamy | Infamous Quests | Phoenix Online Studios | Windows, OS X | 10 July 2014 | | |
| Detective Case and Clown Bot in: Murder in the Hotel Lisbon | Nerd Monkeys | Nerd Monkeys | Windows, OS X, Linux, iOS, Nintendo Switch | 17 July 2014 | | GameMaker |
| Gods Will Be Watching | Deconstructeam | Devolver Digital | Windows, OS X, Linux, iOS | 24 July 2014 | | GameMaker |
| Mind: Path to Thalamus | Pantumaca Barcelona | Talking About Media | Windows, OS X, PlayStation 4, Linux | 5 August 2014 | First adventure game to use Unreal Engine 4 | Unreal Engine 4 |
| The Vanishing of Ethan Carter | The Astronauts | The Astronauts | Windows, PlayStation 4 | 26 September 2014 | First video game to use photogrammetry | Unreal Engine 3 (2014) Unreal Engine 4 (Redux) |
| Sherlock Holmes: Crimes & Punishments | Frogwares | Focus Home Interactive | Windows, PlayStation 3, PlayStation 4, Xbox 360, Xbox One | 30 September 2014 | Part 9 of the Adventures of Sherlock Holmes series | Unreal Engine 3 |
| A Golden Wake | Grundislav Games | Wadjet Eye Games | Windows, Linux, OS X, | 9 October 2014 | | Adventure Game Studio |
| Nancy Drew: Labyrinth of Lies | HeR Interactive | HeR Interactive | Windows | 14 October 2014 | | |
| Dreamfall Chapters | Red Thread Games | Red Thread Games | Windows, Linux, OS X, PlayStation Network | 21 October 2014 | Initially released as part 1 of a 5-part series | Unity |
| A Bird Story | Freebird Games | Freebird Games | Windows, Linux, OS X | 5 November 2014 | | RPG Maker |
| A Date in the Park | Cloak and Dagger Games | Cloak and Dagger Games | Windows | 26 November 2014 | | Adventure Game Studio |
| Game of Thrones | Telltale Games | Telltale Games | Windows, OS X, PlayStation 3, PlayStation 4, Xbox 360, Xbox One, iOS, Android | 2 December 2014 | Released as 6 episodes, last one available on 17 November 2015 | Telltale Tool |
| The Talos Principle | Croteam | Devolver Digital | Windows, OS X, Linux, PlayStation 4, Xbox One, iOS, Android, Nintendo Switch | 11 December 2014 | | Serious Engine 4 |
| Life Is Strange | Dontnod Entertainment | Square Enix | Windows, PlayStation 4, PlayStation 3, Xbox One, Xbox 360, Nintendo Switch | 30 January 2015 | | Unreal Engine 3 |
| The Book of Unwritten Tales 2 | KING Art Games | Nordic Games | Windows, OS X, Linux | 20 February 2015 | | Unity |
| Tormentum – Dark Sorrow | OhNoo Studio | OhNoo Studio | Windows, OS X, Android, iOS | 4 March 2015 | | Adobe AIR |
| Nancy Drew: Sea of Darkness | HeR Interactive | HeR Interactive | Microsoft Windows | 19 May 2015 | | |
| Sunset | Tale of Tales | Tale of Tales | Windows, OS X, Linux | 21 May 2015 | | Unity |
| Technobabylon | Technocrat Games | Wadjet Eye Games | Windows | 21 May 2015 | | Adventure Game Studio |
| Subject 13 | Microïds | Microïds | Windows, OS X, PlayStation 4, Xbox One | 28 May 2015 | | Unity |
| D4: Dark Dreams Don't Die | Access Games | Microsoft Studios | Windows, Xbox One | 5 June 2015 | | Unreal Engine 3 |
| Anna's Quest | Krams Design | Daedalic Entertainment | Microsoft Windows, Nintendo Switch, PlayStation 4, Xbox One | 2 July 2015 | | |
| The Great Ace Attorney: Adventures | Capcom | Capcom | Nintendo 3DS, Android, iOS, Microsoft Windows, Nintendo Switch, PlayStation 4 | 9 July 2015 | | [proprietary engine] |
| King's Quest | The Odd Gentlemen | Activision (Under the Sierra Entertainment brand name) | Windows, PlayStation 3, PlayStation 4, Xbox 360, Xbox One | 28 July 2015 | Released as 5 episodes and an epilogue, concluding on 20 December 2016. | Unreal Engine 3 |
| Everybody's Gone to the Rapture | The Chinese Room | Sony Computer Entertainment | Windows, PlayStation 4 | 11 August 2015 | | Unreal Engine 4 |
| Fran Bow | Killmonday Games | Natalia Figueroa | Windows, OS X, Linux, IOS, Android | 27 August 2015 | | GameMaker |
| Stasis | The Brotherhood Games | The Brotherhood Games | Windows, OS X | 31 August 2015 | | Visionaire Studio |
| Dropsy | Tendershoot | Devolver Digital | Windows, OS X, Linux, iOS, Android | 10 September 2015 | | Unity |
| Soma | Frictional Games | Frictional Games | Windows, Linux, OS X, PlayStation 4, Xbox One | 22 September 2015 | | HPL Engine 3 |
| Else Heart.Break() | Erik Svedäng | Erik Svedäng | Windows, macOS, Linux | 24 September 2015 | First open-world game to feature functional programming | Unity |
| Armikrog | Pencil Test Studios | Pencil Test Studios | Windows, Linux, OS X, Wii U | 30 September 2015 | | Unity |
| The Beginner's Guide | Everything Unlimited Ltd. | Everything Unlimited Ltd. | Windows, Linux, OS X | 1 October 2015 | | Source |
| Lost Horizon 2 | Animation Arts | Deep Silver | Windows, Nintendo Switch, Android | 1 October 2015 | | Unity |
| 2064: Read Only Memories | MidBoss | MidBoss | Windows, OS X | 6 October 2015 | | Unity |
| Adventure Time: Finn & Jake Investigations | Vicious Cycle Software | Little Orbit | Windows, PlayStation 3, PlayStation 4, Xbox 360, Xbox One, Wii U, Nintendo 3DS | 20 October 2015 | | Vicious Engine 2 |
| The Park | Funcom | Funcom | Windows, PlayStation 4, Xbox One | 27 October 2015 | | Unreal Engine 4 |
| Dr. Langeskov, The Tiger, and The Terribly Cursed Emerald: A Whirlwind Heist | Crows Crows Crows | Crows Crows Crows | Windows, macOS | 4 December 2015 | | Unity |
| That Dragon, Cancer | Numinous Games | Numinous Games | Windows, macOS | 12 January 2016 | | Unity |
| Infra | Loiste Interactive | Loiste Interactive | Windows | 15 January 2016 | | Source |
| Oxenfree | Night School Studio | Night School Studio | Windows, PlayStation 4, Xbox One, Nintendo Switch | 15 January 2016 | | Unity |
| The Order of the Thorne - The King's Challenge | Infamous Quests | Infamous Quests | Windows, macOS, Linux | 16 January 2016 | | |
| Agatha Christie - The ABC Murders | Microids, Artefacts Studio | Anuman Interactive | Windows, Linux, OS X, PlayStation 4, Xbox One | 4 February 2016 | | Unity |
| Firewatch | Campo Santo | Panic Inc. | Windows, PlayStation 4, Xbox One, Nintendo Switch | 9 February 2016 | | Unity |
| Downfall | Harvester Games | Screen 7 | Windows, Linux | 15 February 2016 | | |
| Californium | Darjeeling, Nova Productions | Arte | Windows, OS X, | 17 February 2016 | | Unity |
| The Town of Light | LKA | Wired Productions | Windows, PlayStation 4, Xbox One, Nintendo Switch | 26 February 2016 | | Unity |
| Deponia Doomsday | Daedalic Entertainment | Daedalic Entertainment | Windows OS X PlayStation 4, Xbox One | 1 March 2016 | Fourth installment of the Deponia franchise | Visionaire Studio |
| Shardlight | Wadjet Eye Games | Wadjet Eye Games | Windows | 8 March 2016 | | Adventure Game Studio |
| Samorost 3 | Amanita Design | Amanita Design | Windows, OS X, iOS, Android | 24 March 2016 | | Adobe AIR |
| NightCry | Nude Maker | Playism | Windows | 29 March 2016 | | Unity |
| Pollen | Mindfield Games | Mindfield Games | Windows, PlayStation 4 | 20 April 2016 | | Unity |
| Kathy Rain | Clifftop Games | Raw Fury | Windows, OS X, iOS, Android | 5 May 2016 | | Adventure Game Studio |
| Désiré | Sylvain Seccia | Sylvain Seccia | Macintosh, Windows, Android, iOS | 10 May 2016 | | |
| Phoenix Wright: Ace Attorney – Spirit of Justice | Capcom | Capcom | Nintendo 3DS, iOS, Android | 9 June 2016 | | [proprietary engine] |
| Sherlock Holmes: The Devil's Daughter | Frogwares | Bigben Interactive | Windows, PlayStation 4, Xbox One | 10 June 2016 | Part 10 of the Adventures of Sherlock Holmes series | Unreal Engine 3 |
| Zero Time Dilemma | Chime | Spike Chunsoft, Aksys Games, Rising Star Games | Nintendo 3DS, PlayStation Vita, Windows, PlayStation 4 | 28 June 2016 | Part of the Zero Escape series | [proprietary engine] |
| Quadrilateral Cowboy | Blendo Games | Blendo Games | Windows, OS X, Linux | 25 July 2016 | | Id Tech 4 |
| Abzu | Giant Squid Studios | 505 Games | Windows, PlayStation 4, Xbox One, Nintendo Switch | 2 August 2016 | | Unreal Engine 4 |
| Batman - The Telltale Series | Telltale Games | Telltale Games | Windows, PlayStation 4, Xbox One | 2 August 2016 | | Telltale Tool |
| Preston Sterling | Animation Arts | Animation Arts | Windows | 18 August 2016 | | Unity |
| Obduction | Cyan Worlds | Cyan Worlds | Windows, macOS, PlayStation 4, Oculus Rift | 24 August 2016 | | Unreal Engine 4 |
| Warcraft Adventures: Lord of the Clans | Blizzard Entertainment | Blizzard Entertainment | Windows, Mac OS | 9 September 2016 (fan release) | Cancelled on 22 May 1998: on 9 September 2016, a near feature-complete version of the game leaked online | [proprietary engine] |
| Event 0 | Ocelot Society | Ocelot Society | Windows, macOS | 14 September 2016 | | Unity |
| Virginia | Variable State | 505 Games | Windows, macOS, PlayStation 4, Xbox One | 22 September 2016 | | Unity |
| Batman: Arkham VR | Rocksteady Studios | Warner Bros. Games | Windows, PlayStation 4 | 11 October 2016 | First game in the Batman: Arkham series to be rendered in virtual reality | Unreal Engine 4 |
| Accounting | Crows Crows Crows, Squanch Games | Crows Crows Crows | Windows, PlayStation 4, Quest | 18 October 2016 | | Unity |
| The Beard in the Mirror | Oh, a Rock! Studios | Oh, a Rock! Studios | Windows | 25 October 2016 | | |
| The Tomorrow Children | Q-Games | Sony Interactive Entertainment | PlayStation 4, PlayStation 5 | 25 October 2016 | | [proprietary engine] |
| Tales | Ape Marina | Screen 7 | Windows | 14 November 2016 | | |
| Silence | Daedalic Entertainment | Daedalic Entertainment | Windows, OS X, Xbox One, PlayStation 4, Linux | 15 November 2016 | Sequel to The Whispered World | |
| Quern - Undying Thoughts | Zadbox Entertainment | Zadbox Entertainment | Windows, OS X, Linux | 28 November 2016 | | |
| Maize | Finish Line Games | Finish Line Games | Windows | 1 December 2016 | | Unreal Engine 4 |
| Milkmaid of the Milky Way | Machineboy | Machineboy | Windows, iOS, Android, macOS | 5 January 2017 | | |
| Danganronpa V3: Killing Harmony | Spike Chunsoft | NIS America, Spike Chunsoft | PlayStation Vita, Microsoft Windows, PlayStation 4 | 12 January 2017 | | |
| Memoranda | Bit Byterz | Digital Dragon | Windows, OS X, Xbox One, PlayStation 4, Nintendo Switch, Linux, iOS | 25 January 2017 | | |
| The Frostrune | Grimnir AS | Snow Cannon Games, Inc. | Windows, OS X, Android, iOS | 1 February 2017 | | |
| The Mooseman | Morteshka | Sometimes Ypu | Windows, Xbox One, PlayStation 4, Nintendo Switch, Android, iOS | 17 February 2017 | | Unity |
| Night in the Woods | Infinite Fall, Secret Lab | Finji | Windows, Mac, Linux, PlayStation 4, Xbox One, Nintendo Switch, iOS | 21 February 2017 | | Unity |
| Four Last Things | Joe Richardson | Joe Richardson | Windows, OS X, Linux | 23 February 2017 | | |
| Thimbleweed Park | Terrible Toybox | Terrible Toybox | Windows, OS X, Xbox One, PlayStation 4, Nintendo Switch, Linux, Android, iOS | 30 March 2017 | | |
| Paradigm | Jacob Janerka | Jacob Janerka | Windows, macOS | 5 April 2017 | | |
| The Franz Kafka Videogame | Denis Galanin | Daedalic Entertainment | Windows, iOS, Android | 6 April 2017 | | Moai |
| Rick and Morty: Virtual Rick-ality | Owlchemy Labs | Adult Swim Games | Microsoft Windows, PlayStation 4 | 20 April 2017 | First virtual reality game published by Adult Swim Games. | Unity |
| Conarium | Zoetrope Interactive | Iceberg Interactive | Windows, Linux, OS X, PlayStation 4, Xbox One, Nintendo Switch | 6 June 2017 | | Unreal Engine 4 |
| Syberia III | Anuman Interactive | Anuman Interactive | Windows, macOS, Xbox One, PlayStation 4, Nintendo Switch | 20 June 2017 | | Unity |
| Tacoma | Fullbright | Fullbright | Windows, Linux, OS X, PlayStation 4, Xbox One | 2 August 2017 | | Unity |
| The Great Ace Attorney 2: Resolve | Capcom | Capcom | Nintendo 3DS, Android, iOS, Microsoft Windows, Nintendo Switch, PlayStation 4 | 3 August 2017 | | [proprietary engine] |
| Batman: The Enemy Within | Telltale Games | Telltale Games | Windows, OS X, Nintendo Switch, Linux, Android, iOS, PlayStation 4, Xbox One | 8 August 2017 | Episode 1 initial release | Telltale Tool |
| Observer | Bloober Team | Aspyr | Windows, PlayStation 4, Xbox One, Linux, macOS, Nintendo Switch, Xbox Series X/S, PlayStation 5 | 15 August 2017 | | Unreal Engine 4 |
| Jake Hunter Detective Story: Ghost of the Dusk | Arc System Works | Arc System Works, Aksys Games | Nintendo 3DS | 31 August 2017 | | |
| Life Is Strange: Before the Storm | Deck Nine | Square Enix | Windows, PlayStation 4, Xbox One, Nintendo Switch | 31 August 2017 | | Unity |
| Midnight Scenes | Octavi Navarro | Octavi Navarro | Windows, OS X | 26 September 2017 | Series of small games | [unknown] |
| Legend of Hand | Cloak and Dagger Games | Cloak and Dagger Games | Windows | 27 September 2017 | | Adventure Game Studio |
| Black Mirror | KING Art Games | THQ Nordic | Linux, Windows, OS X, PlayStation 4, Xbox One | 28 November 2017 | | Unity |
| Finding Paradise | Freebird Games | Freebird Games | Windows, OS X, Nintendo Switch, Linux, Android, iOS | 14 December 2017 | | Freebird Games |
| Captain Disaster in: Death Has A Million Stomping Boots | Team Disaster | Team Disaster | Windows | 29 December 2017 | Part 2 of the Captain Disaster series. | Adventure Game Studio |
| Football Game | Cloak and Dagger Games | Cloak and Dagger Games | Windows, PlayStation 4, Nintendo Switch, Xbox One, PS Vita | 13 February 2018 | | Adventure Game Studio |
| Quantum Derail | Rubén López | Aruma Studios | Browser | 15 February 2018 | | PiXL engine |
| The Librarian | Octavi Navarro | Octavi Navarro | Windows, OS X | 11 April 2018 | | [unknown] |
| Unforeseen Incidents | Backwoods Entertainment, Application Systems Heidelberg | Application Systems Heidelberg | Windows, OS X, Linux, Android, iOS | 24 May 2018 | | Unity |
| Detroit: Become Human | Quantic Dream | Sony Interactive Entertainment | Windows, PlayStation 4 | 25 May 2018 | | [proprietary engine] |
| The Awesome Adventures of Captain Spirit | Dontnod Entertainment | Square Enix | Windows, PlayStation 4, Xbox One | 25 June 2018 | | Unreal Engine 4 |
| Detective Case and Clown Bot in: The Express Killer | Nerd Monkeys | Nerd Monkeys | Windows | 19 July 2018 | | GameMaker |
| Unavowed | Wadjet Eye Games | Wadjet Eye Games | Windows, macOS | 8 August 2018 | | Adventure Game Studio |
| Lamplight City | Grundislav Games | Application Systems Heidelberg | Windows, macOS, Linux | 13 September 2018 | | Adventure Game Studio |
| The Gardens Between | The Voxel Agents | The Voxel Agents | Windows, OS X, Xbox One, PlayStation 5, PlayStation 4, Nintendo Switch, Linux, Android, iOS | 20 September 2018 | | Unity |
| Life Is Strange 2 | Dontnod Entertainment | Square Enix | Windows, PlayStation 4, Xbox One, Nintendo Switch | 27 September 2018 | | Unreal Engine 4 |
| Deliver Us the Moon | KeoKen Interactive | Wired Productions | Windows, PlayStation 5, PlayStation 4, Xbox Series X/S, Xbox One, Stadia | 28 September 2018 | | Unreal Engine 4 |
| Retro Mystery Club Vol.1: The Ise-Shima Case | Happy Meal | Flyhigh Works | Nintendo Switch, PlayStation 4, Windows | 24 January 2019 | | |
| Eastshade | Eastshade Studios | Eastshade Studios | Windows, PlayStation 4, Xbox One | 13 February 2019 | | Unity |
| The Cursed Forest | KPy3O, Noostyche | Grable Team | Windows | 26 February 2019 | Remake of 2015 game of the same name | CryEngine |
| The Occupation | White Paper Games | Humble Bundle | Windows, PlayStation 4, Xbox One | 5 March 2019 | | Unreal Engine 4 |
| Whispers of a Machine | Clifftop Games | Raw Fury | Windows, OS X, iOS, Android | 17 April 2019 | | Adventure Game Studio |
| Lorelai | Harvester Games | Screen 7 | Windows | 26 April 2019 | Point & click hybrid | Unity |
| Tales of the Neon Sea | Palm Pioneer, YiTi Games | Zodiac Interactive, Boke Technology Co., Ltd, Thermite Games | Microsoft Windows, iOS, Nintendo Switch, Xbox One, Xbox Series X/S, PlayStation 4 | 29 April 2019 | | Unity |
| Sumatra: Fate of Yandi | Cloak and Dagger Games | Cloak and Dagger Games | Windows, Xbox One | 14 May 2019 | | Adventure Game Studio |
| Irony Curtain: From Matryoshka with Love | Artifex Mundi | Artifex Mundi | Windows, PlayStation 4, Xbox One, Nintendo Switch | 16 May 2019 | | Spark Casual Engine |
| Outer Wilds | Mobius Digital | Annapurna Interactive | Windows, PlayStation 5, PlayStation 4, Xbox Series X/S, Xbox One, Nintendo Switch | 28 May 2019 | | Unity |
| The Sinking City | Frogwares | Frogwares, Bigben Interactive | Windows, PlayStation 5, PlayStation 4, Xbox Series X/S, Xbox One, Nintendo Switch | 26 June 2019 | | Unreal Engine 4 |
| Yet Another Hero Story | Sinking Sheep | Sinking Sheep | Windows, OS X, Linux | 9 July 2019 | | Visionaire Studio |
| A Short Hike | Adam-Robinson Yu | Adam-Robinson Yu | Windows, Linux, OS X, PlayStation 4, Xbox One, Nintendo Switch | 30 July 2019 | | Unity |
| Gibbous - A Cthulhu Adventure | Stuck In Attic | Stuck In Attic | Windows, OS X, Linux, | 7 August 2019 | | Unity |
| AI: The Somnium Files | Spike Chunsoft | Spike Chunsoft | Windows, Nintendo Switch, PlayStation 4, Xbox One | 17 September 2019 | | Unity |
| Little Misfortune | Killmonday Games | Killmonday Games | iOS, Microsoft Windows, macOS, Linux, Nintendo Switch, Android | 18 September 2019 | | Unity |
| Jenny LeClue: Detectivú | Mografi | Mografi | iOS, Microsoft Windows, macOS, Linux, PlayStation 4, Nintendo Switch | 19 September 2019 | | Unity |
| The Terrible Old Man | Cloak and Dagger Games | Cloak and Dagger Games | Windows | 10 October 2019 | | Adventure Game Studio |
| Blacksad: Under the Skin | Pendulo Studios | Microïds | Windows, Xbox One, PlayStation 4, Nintendo Switch | 14 November 2019 | Adaptation of Blacksad | Unity |
| Still There | GhostShark Games | Iceberg Interactive | Windows, macOS, Nintendo Switch | 20 November 2019 | | Unity |
| Adventureland XL | Clopas | Clopas | Windows, macOS | 2 December 2019 | Remake of Adventureland | |
| Nancy Drew: Midnight in Salem | HeR Interactive | HeR Interactive | Windows | 3 December 2019 | | |

== 2020s ==
Notable graphic adventure games of the 2020s
| Game | Developer | Publisher | System | Date released | Notes | Game engine |
|---|---|---|---|---|---|---|
| LUNA: The Shadow Dust | Lantern Studio | Application Systems Heidelberg, Coconut Island Games | Windows, OS X, Linux, iOS, Android, Nintendo Switch | 13 February 2020 | | Unity |
| Delores: A Thimbleweed Park Mini-Adventure | Terrible Toybox | Terrible Toybox | Windows, macOS | 9 May 2020 | Follow-up to Thimbleweed Park | [proprietary engine] |
| VirtuaVerse | Theta Division Games | Blood Music | Windows | 12 May 2020 | | Unity |
| Beyond a Steel Sky | Revolution Software | Revolution Software | Windows, macOS | 26 June 2020 | Sequel to Beneath a Steel Sky | Unreal Engine 4 |
| Röki | Polygon Treehouse | United Label Games | Windows, Nintendo Switch | 23 July 2020 | | Unity |
| 3 out of 10 | Terrible Posture Games | Terrible Posture Games | Microsoft Windows, Xbox One, Xbox Series X, Nintendo Switch | 6 August 2020 | | Unreal Engine 4 |
| Amnesia: Rebirth | Frictional Games | Frictional Games | Windows, PlayStation 4, Xbox Series X, Xbox One | 20 October 2020 | | HPL Engine 3.5 |
| Transient | Stormling Studios | Iceberg Interactive | Windows, Xbox One, PlayStation 4, Nintendo Switch | 28 October 2020 | | Unreal Engine 4 |
| Call of the Sea | Out of the Blue | Raw Fury | Windows, PlayStation 5, PlayStation 4, Xbox Series X/S, Xbox One, Nintendo Switch | 8 December 2020 | | Unreal Engine 4 |
| Encodya | Chaosmonger Studio | Assemble Entertainment | Windows, macOS, Linux | 26 January 2021 | | Unity |
| Piposh | Ronen and Roy Gluzman | Ronen and Roy Gluzman | Windows | 31 March 2021 | | Unity |
| Strangeland | Wormwood Studios | Wadjet Eye Games | Windows | 25 May 2021 | | Adventure Game Studio |
| Nemezis: Mysterious Journey III | Detalion Games | PlayWay, Detalion Games | Windows | 8 July 2021 | | Unreal Engine 4 |
| The Forgotten City | Modern Storyteller | Dear Villagers | Windows | 28 July 2021 | | Unreal Engine 4 |
| Road 96 | DigixArt | DigixArt | Windows, PlayStation 5, PlayStation 4, Xbox Series X/S, Xbox One, Nintendo Switch | 16 August 2021 | | Unity |
| Twelve Minutes | Luis Antonio | Annapurna Interactive | Windows, PlayStation 5, PlayStation 4, Xbox Series X/S, Xbox One, Nintendo Switch | 19 August 2021 | | Unity |
| Life Is Strange: True Colors | Deck Nine | Square Enix | Windows, PlayStation 5, PlayStation 4, Xbox Series X/S, Xbox One, Nintendo Switch, Stadia | 10 September 2021 | | Unreal Engine 4 |
| Sable | Shedworks | Raw Fury | Windows | 23 September 2021 | | Unity |
| Dagon: by H. P. Lovecraft | Bit Golem | Bit Golem | Windows | 24 September 2021 | Inspired by Dagon | Unity |
| Impostor Factory | Freebird Games | Freebird Games | Windows, macOS, Linux | 30 September 2021 | | RPG Maker |
| Sherlock Holmes Chapter One | Frogwares | Frogwares | Windows, PlayStation 5, PlayStation 4, Xbox Series X/S | 16 November 2021 | First game in the titular series self-published by Frogwares | Unreal Engine 4 |
| Alfred Hitchcock – Vertigo | Pendulo Studios | Microids | Windows, PlayStation 5, PlayStation 4, Xbox Series X/S, Xbox One, Nintendo Switch | 16 December 2021 | Inspired by Alfred Hitchcock's films, particularly Vertigo | Unity |
| Watch Over Christmas | Dionous Games | Dionous Games | Windows | 21 December 2021 | | Visionaire Studio |
| Aquamarine | Moebial Studios | Hitcent | Windows, Linux, OS X | 20 January 2022 | | Unity |
| Submerged: Hidden Depths | Uppercut Games | Uppercut Games | Windows, PlayStation 5, PlayStation 4, Xbox Series X/S, Xbox One | 10 March 2022 | | Unreal Engine 4 |
| Syberia: The World Before | Microïds | Microïds | Windows | 18 March 2022 | | Unity |
| Crowns and Pawns: Kingdom of Deceit | Tag of Joy | Thunderful Publishing | Linux, macOS, Windows | 6 May 2022 | | |
| We Were Here Forever | Total Mayhem Games | Total Mayhem Games | Windows | 10 May 2022 | | Unity |
| Eternal Threads | Cosmonaut Studios | Secret Mode | Windows, PlayStation 5, PlayStation 4, Xbox Series X/S, Xbox One, Nintendo Switch | 19 May 2022 | | Unity |
| Silt | Spiral Circus | Firecircus Games | Windows, PlayStation 5, PlayStation 4, Xbox Series X/S, Xbox One | 1 June 2022 | | Unity |
| Nightmare Frames | Potmodern Adventures | Postmodern Adventures | Windows | 16 June 2022 | | Adventure Game Studio |
| AI: The Somnium Files – Nirvana Initiative | Spike Chunsoft | Spike Chunsoft | Windows, Nintendo Switch, PlayStation 4, Xbox One | 23 June 2022 | | Unity |
| Intruder in Antiquonia | Aruma Studios | Aruma Studios | | 8 July 2022 | | [proprietary engine] |
| Stray | BlueTwelve Studio | Annapurna Interactive | Windows, PlayStation 5, PlayStation 4 | 19 July 2022 | | Unreal Engine 4 |
| Hindsight | Team Hindsight | Annapurna Interactive | macOS, Nintendo Switch, iOS, Windows, PlayStation 4, PlayStation 5, Xbox One, Xbox Series X/S | 4 August 2022 | | Unity |
| Lost in Play | Happy Juice Games | Joystick Ventures | Windows, OS X, Nintendo Switch | 10 August 2022 | | Unity |
| We Are OFK | Team OFK | Team OFK | Windows, OS X, Nintendo Switch, PlayStation 4, PlayStation 5 | 18 August 2022 | | Unity |
| Eolia | ROTU Entertainment | ROTU Entertainment | Windows | 1 September 2022 | VR adventure game with functional hand-tracking technology. | Unreal Engine 4 |
| Return to Monkey Island | Terrible Toybox | Devolver Digital | Windows, OS X, Nintendo Switch | 19 September 2022 | Sixth entry in the Monkey Island series. | DInky |
| The Excavation of Hob's Barrow | Cloak and Dadgger Games | Wadjet Eye Games | Windows, Nintendo Switch | 28 September 2022 | | Adventure Game Studio |
| Sunday Gold | BKOM Studios | Team17 | Windows | 13 October 2022 | Adventure and role-playing hybrid | [proprietary engine] |
| New Tales from the Borderlands | Gearbox Software | 2K | Windows, PlayStation 5, PlayStation 4, Xbox Series X/S, Xbox One, Nintendo Switch | 21 October 2022 | | Unreal Engine 4 |
| Charon's Staircase | Indigo Studios | Soedesco | Windows | 28 October 2022 | | Unreal Engine 4 |
| Pentiment | Obsidian Entertainment | Xbox Game Studios | Windows, Xbox One, Xbox Series X/S | 15 November 2022 | | Unity |
| Somerville | Jumpship | Jumpship | Windows, Xbox One, Xbox Series X/S | 15 November 2022 | | Unity |
| The Dark Pictures Anthology: The Devil in Me | Supermassive Games | Bandai Namco Entertainment | Windows, PlayStation 5, PlayStation 4, Xbox Series X/S, Xbox One | 18 November 2022 | | Unreal Engine 4 |
| Cats and the Other Lives | Cultic Games | Cultic Games | Windows, OS X | 21 November 2022 | | |
| Azazel's Christmas Fable | Greg Muhlbock | Greg Muhlbock | Windows | 29 November 2022 | | Adventure Game Studio |
| Die O' Clock | Darkest Room | Darkest Room | Windows | 29 November 2022 | | |
| Futurust | Cobble Games | Cobble Games | Windows | 30 November 2022 | | |
| Children of Silentown | Elf Games | Daedalic Entertainment | Windows, Nintendo Switch, PlayStation 5, PlayStation 4, Xbox Series X/S, Xbox One | 11 January 2023 | | Unity |
| Colossal Cave | Cygnus Entertainment | Cygnus Entertainment | Windows, Nintendo Switch, PlayStation 5, Xbox Series X/S | 19 January 2023 | Re-imagining of Colossal Cave Adventure, the first adventure game. | Unity |
| A Space for the Unbound | Mojiken | Toge Productions | Windows, PlayStation 5, PlayStation 4, Xbox Series X/S, Xbox One, Nintendo Switch | 19 January 2023 | | Unity |
| Season: A Letter to the Future | Scavengers Studio | Scavengers Studio | Windows, PlayStation 5, PlayStation 4 | 31 January 2023 | | Unreal Engine 4 |
| Deliver Us Mars | KeokeN Interactive | Frontier Foundry | Windows, PlayStation 5, PlayStation 4, Xbox Series X/S, Xbox One | 2 February 2023 | Sequel to Deliver Us the Moon. | Unreal Engine 4 |
| Blanc | Casus Ludi | Gearbox Software | Windows, Nintendo Switch | 14 February 2023 | | [unknown] |
| The Forest Cathedral | Brian Wilson | Whitethorn Games | Windows, Nintendo Switch, PlayStation 5, PlayStation 4, Xbox Series X/S, Xbox One | 14 March 2023 | | Unity |
| Simon The Sorcerer: Origins | Leonardo Interactive | Smallthing Studios | Windows, Nintendo Switch, PlayStation 5, PlayStation 4, Xbox Series X/S, Xbox One | 28 March 2023 | Prequel to Simon the Sorcerer | [unknown] |
| The Library of Babel | Tanuki Game Studio | Neon Doctrine | Windows, Nintendo Switch, PlayStation 5, PlayStation 4, Xbox Series X/S, Xbox One | 7 April 2023 | Video game adaptation of Jorge Luis Borges' 1941 titular novel. | Unity |
| Firmament | Cyan Worlds | Cyan Worlds | Windows, OS X | 18 May 2023 | | Unreal Engine 4 |
| Duck Detective: The Secret Salami | Happy Broccoli Games | Happy Broccoli Games | Windows, macOS, Nintendo Switch, Xbox Series X/S, Xbox One | 23 May 2023 | | Unity |
| Star Trek: Resurgence | Dramatic Labs | Bruner House | Windows, PlayStation 5, PlayStation 4, Xbox Series X/S, Xbox One | 23 May 2023 | | Unreal Engine 4, Beanie |
| Decarnation | Atelier QDB | Shiro Unlimited | Windows, Nintendo Switch | 31 May 2023 | | Unity |
| Amnesia: The Bunker | Frictional Games | Frictional Games | Windows, PlayStation 4, Xbox Series X/S, Xbox One | 6 June 2023 | | HPL Engine 3.5 |
| Layers of Fear (Remake) | Bloober Team | Bloober Team | Windows, OS X, PlayStation 5, Xbox Series X/S | 15 June 2023 | First adventure game powered by Unreal Engine 5 | Unreal Engine 5 |
| Oxenfree II: Lost Signals | Night School Studio | Netflix | Windows, PlayStation 5, PlayStation 4, Switch, Android, iOS | 12 July 2023 | | Unity |
| My Friendly Neighborhood | John Szymanski, Evan Szymanski | DreadXP | Windows | 18 July 2023 | | Unity |
| Agatha Christie - Hercule Poirot: The London Case | Blazing Griffin | Microids | Windows, Nintendo Switch, PlayStation 5, PlayStation 4, Xbox Series X/S, Xbox One | 29 August 2023 | | [unknown] |
| Under the Waves | Parallel Studio | Quantic Dream | Windows, PlayStation 5, PlayStation 4, Xbox Series X/S, Xbox One | 29 August 2023 | Game with strong ecologist themes, made alongside the non-profit Surfrider Foundation | Unreal Engine 4 |
| Torn Away | perelesoq | OverGamez | Windows, Xbox One, Xbox Series X/S, Nintendo Switch, PlayStation 4, PlayStation 5 | 29 September 2023 | | Unity |
| Agatha Christie: Murder on the Orient Express | Microids | Microids | Windows, Nintendo Switch, PlayStation 5, PlayStation 4, Xbox Series X/S, Xbox One | 19 October 2023 | Remake of the 2006 graphic adventure with the same name | Unity |
| The Invincible | Starward Industries | 11 Bit Studios | Windows, PlayStation 5, Xbox Series X/S | 6 November 2023 | | Unreal Engine 5 |
| No Case Should Remain Unsolved | Somi | Somi | Windows, macOS, Nintendo Switch | 18 January 2024 | | Unity |
| The Lost Legends of Redwall: The Scout Anthology | Soma Games | Soma Games | Windows, PlayStation 4, Xbox One | 30 January 2024 | Full release of the episodic game | Unity |
| Snufkin: Melody of Moominvalley | Hyper Games | Raw Fury | Windows, macOS, Nintendo Switch | 7 March 2024 | | Unity |
| Scott Whiskers in: the Search for Mr.Fumbleclaw | Fancy Factory | Fancy Factory | Windows, Mac, Linux, PlayStation 5, PlayStation 4, Xbox Series X/S, Xbox One, Nintendo Switch, iOS, Android, Android TV | 20 March 2024 | | Unity |
| Pools | Tensori | Unikat Label | Windows, macOS, Linux, Nintendo Switch, PlayStation 5 | 26 April 2024 | | Unity |
| Indika | Odd Meter | 11 Bit Studios | Windows, PlayStation 5, Xbox Series X/S | 2 May 2024 | | Unreal Engine 4 |
| Sacred Line II | Sasha Darko | | Sega Genesis | 13 May 2024 | | GINCS |
| An English Haunting | Postmodern Adventures | Postmodern Adventures, enComplot | Windows | 22 May 2024 | | Adventure Game Studio |
| Still Wakes the Deep | The Chinese Room | Sumo Group | Windows, PlayStation 5, Xbox Series X/S | 18 June 2024 | | Unreal Engine 5 |
| Nancy Drew - Mystery of the Seven Keys | HeR Interactive | HeR Interactive | Windows | 20 June 2024 | | Unity |
| Riven | Cyan Worlds | Cyan Worlds | Windows, macOS | 25 June 2024 | Remake of the titular 1997 game. | Unreal Engine 5 |
| Until Then | Polychroma Games | Maximum Entertainment | Windows, Linux, PlayStation 5 | 25 June 2024 | | Godot |
| Nobody Wants to Die | Critical Hit Games | Plaion | Windows, PlayStation 5, Xbox Series X/S | 17 July 2024 | | Unreal Engine 5 |
| Thalassa: Edge of the Abyss | Sarepta Studio | Team17 | Windows | 1 August 2024 | | Unreal Engine 4 |
| The Crimson Diamond | Julia Minamata | Julia Minamata | PC | 15 August 2024 | | Adventure Game Studio |
| Caravan SandWitch | Studio Plane Toast | Dear Villagers | Windows, PlayStation 5, Switch, Android, iOS | 12 September 2024 | | Unreal Engine 5 |
| Broken Sword - Shadow of the Templars: Reforged | Revolution Software | Revolution Software | Windows, macOS, Linux, Nintendo Switch, PlayStation 5, Xbox Series X/S, Xbox One | 19 September 2024 | | Virtual Theatre |
| Mouthwashing | Wrong Organ | Critical Reflex | Windows | 26 September 2024 | | Unity |
| Arsene Lupin: Once a Thief | Blazing Griffin | Microids | Windows, Nintendo Switch, PlayStation 5, Xbox Series X/S, Xbox One | 17 October 2024 | | Unity |
| Prim | Common Colors | Application Systems Heidelberg | Windows | 24 October 2024 | Traditional point-&-click adventure game inspired by Tim Burton's work. | Visionaire Studio |
| Life Is Strange: Double Exposure | Deck Nine | Square Enix | Windows, Nintendo Switch, PlayStation 5, Xbox Series X/S, | 29 October 2024 | | Unreal Engine 5 |
| Loco Motive | Robust Games | Chucklefish | Nintendo Switch, Windows | 21 November 2024 | | Unity |
| Lost Records: Bloom & Rage (Tape 1) | Don't Nod Montreal | Don't Nod | Windows, PlayStation 5, Xbox Series X/S | 18 February 2025 | | Unreal Engine 5 |
| Everhood 2 | Chris Nordgren, Jordi Roca | Foreign Gnomes | Nintendo Switch, Windows | 4 March 2025 | | Unity |
| Centum | Hack The Publisher | Serenity Forge | Windows, macOS, Nintendo Switch, PlayStation 5, Xbox Series X/S, Xbox One | 11 March 2025 | | Unity |
| Asylum | Senscape | Senscape | Windows, MacOS, Linux | 13 March 2025 | | Unreal Engine 4 |
| ENA: Dream BBQ | ENA Team | Joel G | Windows | 27 March 2025 | | Unity |
| Karma: The Dark World | Pollard Studio | Wired Productions, Gamera Games | Windows, PlayStation 5 | 27 March 2025 | | Unreal Engine 5 |
| Koira | Tolima Studio | Don't Nod Entertainment | Windows, PlayStation 5 | 1 April 2025 | | Godot |
| Amerzone - The Explorer's Legacy | Microids | Microids | Windows | 24 April 2025 | Remake of the 1999 game | Unreal Engine 5 |
| The Midnight Walk | MoonHood | Fast Travel Games | Windows, PlayStation 5 | 8 May 2025 | | Unreal Engine 5 |
| Kathy Rain 2: Soothsayer | Clifftop Games | Raw Fury | Windows, macOS, Linux | 20 May 2025 | | |
| To a T | uvula | Annapurna Interactive | Windows, PlayStation 5, Xbox Series X/S | 28 May 2025 | | Unreal Engine 5 |
| Saeko: Giantess Dating Sim | Safe Havn | Hyper Real | Windows | 29 May 2025 | | Ebitengine |
| Parallel Experiment | Eleven Puzzles | Eleven Puzzles | Windows, Android, iOS | 5 June 2025 | | |
| Discopup | Parry Mechanics | Parry Mechanics | Windows, MacOS | 25 July 2025 | | Unity |
| One-Eyed Likho | Morteshka | Morteshka | Windows | 28 July 2025 | | Unity |
| Deep Sleep: Labyrinth of the Forsaken | scripwelder | Armor Game Studios | Nintendo Switch, Windows | 21 August 2025 | | |
| Foolish Mortals | Inklingwood Studios | Inklingwood Studios | Windows | 5 November 2025 | | Visionaire Studio |
| Detective Instinct: Farewell, My Beloved | Armonica LLC | Armonica LLC | Nintendo Switch, Windows | 26 November 2025 | | |
| Shadows of the Afterland | Aruma Studios | Aruma Studios | Windows | 10 February 2026 | | [proprietary engine] |
| Mirage 7 | Drakkar Dev | Blowfish Games | Windows, PlayStation 5, PlayStation 4, Xbox Series X/S, Xbox One | 6 March 2026 | | |
| Cthulhu: The Cosmic Abyss | Big Bad Wolf | Nacon | Windows, PlayStation 5, Xbox Series X/S | 16 April 2026 | | Unreal Engine 5 |
| Tides of Tomorrow | DigixArt | THQ Nordic | Windows, PlayStation 5, Xbox Series X/S | 22 April 2026 | | Unreal Engine 5 |
| Mixtape | Beethoven & Dinosaur | Annapurna Interactive | Windows, PlayStation 5, Xbox Series X/S, Switch 2 | 7 May 2026 | | Unreal Engine 5 |
| Call of the Elder Gods | Out of the Blue Games | Kwalee | Windows, PlayStation 5, Xbox Series X/S, Switch 2 | 12 May 2026 | | Unreal Engine 5 |
| Tormentum 2 | OhNoo Studio | OhNoo Studio | Windows | 23 July 2026 | | |
| Endacopia | ANDYLAND | ANDYLAND | Windows | 27 July 2026 | | |
| Big Walk | House House | Panic | Windows, PlayStation 5, Switch 2 | 4 August 2026 | | |
| Rivage | Exnilo Studio | Raw Fury | Windows, PlayStation 5, Xbox Series X/S | 22 September 2026 | | Unreal Engine 5 |
| The Wolf Among Us 2 | Telltale Games | Telltale Games, Athlon Games | Windows (consoles TBA) | TBA | Sequel to The Wolf Among Us | TBA |

== See also ==
- Visual novel
- Interactive fiction
