= Dave Gilbert (game designer) =

American game designer

- Gilbert in 2013
- Born: David Gilbert; March 31, 1976 (age 50)
- Education: Boston University
- Spouse: Janet Gilbert (2009–present)

Dave Gilbert (born March 31, 1976) is an American designer of independent adventure games using Adventure Game Studio. He began creating home-made, freeware games, and went professional in 2006, founding Wadjet Eye Games and commercially releasing The Shivah and The Blackwell Legacy.

== Game design career ==
Gilbert grew up playing adventure games and first experimented with developing text adventure games using TADS while in college, although nothing was publicly shared. Gilbert's first released adventure game was The Repossessor in 2001, an entry in the Reality-on-the-Norm series (a shared universe for adventure games started by Ben Croshaw). In 2003, Gilbert released Bestowers of Eternity — Part One, a game about a young woman who inherits a family ghost when her aunt dies in an insane asylum. It went on to win multiple awards in the 2003 AGS Awards.

In 2004, the AGS Forums organized the AGS Team Challenge, an informal contest where teams worked together to create an adventure game. Gilbert designed and wrote Two of a Kind for the contest. The game included two playable characters with different abilities and personalities, an unusual feature in an adventure game. This was one of only two games completed (the other was The Hamlet) by the deadline, and both were declared co-winners. Two of a Kind received positive reviews, and won an AGS Award for Best Gameplay.

In the summer of 2006, Gilbert produced The Shivah, one of the first video games to star a rabbi, for MAGS, the monthly one-month AGS game contest (which it won). After its release, Gilbert decided to rework the freeware version, improving the graphics, adding new puzzles and voice acting, and released it as a commercial title. The game received good reviews and considerable attention in the press, mainly because of its subject matter. It earned some criticism in the Israeli press. The Shivah was sold through Manifesto Games on a non-exclusive basis.

Turning his hobby into a professional career, Gilbert decided to become a full-time game designer. He founded Wadjet Eye Games to sell The Shivah and his forthcoming titles. A few months later, in December 2006, The Blackwell Legacy was released. This game was a much-improved remake of Bestowers of Eternity (revamping the earlier project which he considered to be over-ambitious), but continued past the end of the earlier game, telling more of the story. The Blackwell Legacy was intended as the first installment of an episodic game. The second game, a prequel called Blackwell Unbound, was released on 4 September 2007.

In February 2008, a publishing deal was announced between Wadjet Eye Games and PlayFirst. Under the agreement, Wadjet Eye Games would develop a casual adventure game for PlayFirst. The resulting game, Emerald City Confidential, a noir story set in the world of Oz, was released on 19 February 2009.

== Awards ==
In 2007, Dave Gilbert's Wadjet Eye studios was nominated for Best New Studio in the prestigious Game Developers Choice Awards and presented The Shivah at the associated Game Developers Conference. Gilbert was also awarded the AGS Lifetime Achievement Award in February 2007 to go along with his other eight AGS Awards. In 2008, Gamasutra listed Gilbert and Wadjet Eye as one of their top 20 breakthrough developers.

== Personal life ==
Dave Gilbert is Jewish, a background he drew upon in making The Shivah. Although he states that he is not at all religious, he does feel a strong connection to his Jewish heritage.

Gilbert spent some years in South Korea, teaching English as a second language and spent some time exploring China. He spent most of his life in New York City, where all of his games take place, and witnessed the September 11 attacks, which especially influenced Old Skies. He now lives in Pennsylvania with his wife, Janet, and daughter, Eve.

== Games ==
=== Developed ===
Freeware

- The Repossessor (Reality-on-the Norm) (2001)
- The Postman Only Dies Once (Reality-on-the Norm) (2001)
- Purity of the Surf (Reality-on-the Norm) (2003)
- A Better Mousetrap (Reality-on-the Norm) (2003)
- Bestowers of Eternity - Part One (Adventure Game Studio) (2003)
- Two of a Kind (Adventure Game Studio) (2004)

Commercial (Wadjet Eye Games)

- The Shivah (2006)
- Blackwell series
  - The Blackwell Legacy (2006)
  - Blackwell Unbound (2007)
  - The Blackwell Convergence (2009)
  - The Blackwell Deception (2011)
  - The Blackwell Epiphany (2014)
- Emerald City Confidential (2009)
- Unavowed (2018)
- Old Skies (2025)

=== Produced ===
- Puzzle Bots (2010)
- Gemini Rue (2011)
- Da New Guys: Day of the Jackass (2012)
- Resonance (2012)
- Primordia (2012)
- A Golden Wake (2014)
- Technobabylon (2015)
- Shardlight (2016)
- Strangeland (2021)
- The Excavation of Hob's Barrow (2022)
- Nighthawks (2026)
