= The Blackwell Convergence =

2009 video game

- Developer: Wadjet Eye Games
- Publisher: Wadjet Eye Games
- Designer: Dave Gilbert
- Composer: Thomas Regin
- Series: Blackwell
- Engine: Adventure Game Studio
- Platforms: Microsoft Windows iOS; Android; OS X Linux
- Release: Microsoft Windows; July 22, 2009 iOS; July 10, 2014; Android; September 23, 2014; OS X, Linux; October 8, 2014
- Genre: Adventure
- Mode: Single-player

The Blackwell Convergence is a 2009 graphic adventure game developed and published by Wadjet Eye Games. It is the third entry in the Blackwell series, following The Blackwell Legacy and Blackwell Unbound.

== Plot ==
The Blackwell Convergence takes place six months after the events in Legacy. While visiting a gallery for a preliminary viewing, Rosa starts to investigate a possible lead of a ghost's presence from a director at a film company. She soon finds out that an actor from their recent film has been murdered. Later, Rosa also finds out about an old murder of a researcher whose work was stolen to benefit a rival corporation. Finally, on the gallery's opening night, The Countess, now a ghost, appears and kills the artist whose paintings are on display.

Joey explains to Rosa her aunt's story and history with the Countess. Now understanding that the Countess is responsible for all three deaths and is using another human as an unwitting medium, Rosa works to track down the connection between the three individuals who died to end the threat of the Countess, who is clearly able to outright kill corporeal humans despite being a ghost.

In all three cases, the companies were funded by the venture capitalist firm Meltzer Foundation and Rosa finds out that they had benefited greatly from all three deaths. The company is run by a team of two brothers. The older brother believes Rosa to be making false accusations and claims zero responsibility for any of the deaths. Rosa later realizes that Charles Meltzer, the younger brother, is the medium, who guides the Countess by emailing the next victim. However, unlike The Countess's previous mediums, Charles is fully aware of his newfound power and used it deliberately to benefit himself and the company, with his older brother none the wiser. He then tries to kill Rosa as well, but The Countess's old spirit guide Madeline interferes and Rosa helps her to break the bond between The Countess and Charles Meltzer. Freed from the bond, The Countess tries to take revenge on Charles, shocking the older brother in the process, but is stopped by Rosa and Joey. Rosa helps the Countess to pass on. In the aftermath, Rosa decides to advertise her services as a medium online, as she finds chasing vague leads through one individual at a time tiring.

Rosa would later learn that The Countess was originally a medium just like Rosa, and worked together with Madeline during the Roaring 20s. However, The Countess, young and resentful of her responsibilities as a medium, forcibly cuts her ties to Madeline by trapping her inside the space where ghosts pass on. The void left behind by this severance would later be the reason as to why the Countess went mad and kept looking for new mediums.

== Development ==
Two real people are included in the cast of characters: writer Joseph Mitchell returns, as well as New York eccentric Joe Gould. This game was originally to be released sometime around June 2008, but was delayed for a variety of reasons. The game was released on July 22, 2009. It received a port for iOS on July 10, 2014, one for Android on September 23, 2014, and versions for Linux and OS X on October 8, 2014.

== Reception ==
Reception

Aggregate score
| Aggregator | Score |
|---|---|
| GameRankings | 76% |

Review scores
| Publication | Score |
|---|---|
| Adventure Gamers | 3.5/5 |
| Just Adventure | A |
| GameZebo | 4/5 |

The Blackwell Convergence received a score of 76% on review aggregator GameRankings, indicating favorable reviews.
