= Technobabylon =

2015 video game

- Key art
- Developer: Technocrat Games
- Publisher: Wadjet Eye Games
- Artist: Ben Chandler
- Writer: James Dearden
- Engine: Adventure Game Studio
- Platforms: Microsoft Windows; iOS; Linux; macOS
- Release: Microsoft Windows; 21 May 2015 iOS; 16 August 2017; Linux, macOS; 1 February 2022
- Genre: Adventure game
- Mode: Single-player

Technobabylon is a cyberpunk adventure game developed by Technocrat Games and published by Wadjet Eye Games for Microsoft Windows, iOS, Linux, and macOS. Originally intended as a series of 10 free episodic games, of which three were released, it was released as a full game on 21 May 2015. The game's story covers 10 chapters and focuses on three characters who live in the future city of Newton which is governed by an autonomous AI administrator, each of whom is faced with a complex matter, but soon find themselves caught up in a conspiracy surrounding the city's AI, including murder and hidden truths about its creation.

The game received generally positive reviews, with praise going to its story and puzzles.

== Gameplay ==
The game operates on a typical point-and-click interface used in several adventures, in which players use their mouse to explore and interact with the various environments their characters move through. Each chapter sees the player using one of the game's three protagonists, to solve puzzles within a chapter. While right-clicking objects/NPCs allows them to examine them, left-clicking allows the character to interact with it, either by taking an object or using it and talking to NPCs. At certain points in the game, the player can choose how to complete puzzles and situations; while most are optional, and have little impact on the main story, one choice towards the end affects the ending that players can achieve upon completing the game. Any objects picked up by the player are stored in an inventory, and can be combined with other objects in the inventory, given to NPCs, or used on objects in an environment. Items that are examined are done either through a text-box, or a vocal description by the character.

== Story ==
=== Setting ===
Technobabylon takes place in the cyberpunk city of Newton. Newton is coordinated by a highly advanced AI known as Central which maintains the city's various systems and enforces the laws passed by the civilian government. Centralized Emergency Logistics (CEL) acts as a police force under Central's direct authority. Technology has advanced greatly, with nano-mechanical wetware devices allowing people to modify their brain functions or mentally interface with computers. One such innovation is a virtual reality system called the Trance, in which users can socialize with others via constructed avatars or create content like games and virtual environments.

=== Plot ===
Latha Sesame, an unemployed shut-in addict to the Trance, finds herself locked inside her apartment after being disconnected. Worried, she manages to bypass the door controls and escape. Moments later, there is an explosion in the building.

Twenty hours earlier, doctors Charles Regis and Max Lao, both agents of CEL, investigate a series of murders by an individual known as the Mindjacker. The Mindjacker uses specialized neural implants to steal information directly from a person's brain, killing the victim in the process. Following a lead from Central, Regis and Lao discover the Mindjacker's newest victim in an office building. They corner the suspect on the roof, but he escapes to an aerostat. Returning to his office, Regis finds an anonymous message urging him to get in contact with the sender. Upon doing so, the contact reveals that he has stolen several frozen embryos that Regis had prepared with his late wife Viksha before her death. The contact threatens to destroy the embryos if Regis does not cooperate with his demands. Unwilling to sacrifice his and his wife's legacy, Regis agrees to comply.

The blackmailer tasks Regis with recovering a device called a memory module from the apartment of Giel Van der Waal, a man with ties to organized crime and a person of interest in the Mindjacker case. Lao arrives to inform Regis that Giel has asked to meet, but when the duo arrives at his apartment they find Giel and his husband dead. Regis recovers the memory module and discovers that it corrupted a supply of wetware Giel was using, causing him to have vivid hallucinations which led him to accidentally kill his husband and himself. Regis turns the module over to the blackmailer and is then tasked with placing a bomb in an empty apartment, revealed to be the apartment directly above Latha's, making Regis responsible for the explosion.

Regis concludes that the blackmailer must be Adam Baxter, a former colleague who murdered Regis' wife and was recently paroled. Regis prepares to confront Baxter but encounters Latha at CEL HQ. When she mentions the bombing at her apartment building, Regis realizes she was the intended target and orders her to be kept at CEL HQ for her safety before leaving for Baxter's workplace. Desperate to re-enter the Trance, Latha improvises a connection and encounters a hacker named Jinsil on CEL's network. Jinsil, a member of an anti-Central group called Jihiliyyah, warns Latha that the bombing was a deliberate attempt on her life and shows her a reconstruction of the crime scene, which shows Regis planting the bomb. Recognizing him as the officer she spoke to, Latha escapes from CEL HQ and arranges to make contact with Jinsil again.

Several hours later, Lao is visited by Central's administrator Eduardo Vargas and his daughter Galatea. Vargas, another former colleague of Regis, explains that Baxter has been found dead and Regis is the prime suspect. Lao is assigned to investigate and heads for the crime scene, where she finds a coded message from Regis, claiming that Baxter was dead when he arrived and asking Lao to meet him at an abandoned building. During the investigation, Lao also learns that Regis, Viksha, Vargas, and Baxter were all part of the project that led to Central's creation, though Regis quit after Viksha was killed by Baxter. As Regis waits for Lao to arrive at the meeting place, he is attacked by a group of heavily armed soldiers. An unknown woman makes contact with Regis and helps guide him out of the building, where he reunites with Lao, and Regis arranges to meet the mysterious woman in person.

Latha heads to an underground Trance den hosting a pirate connection and meets with Jinsil through it. Jinsil explains that Latha is most likely being targeted because she has an abnormally high affinity for the Trance, allowing massive amounts of data to be processed through her neural implants. Jinsil tasks Latha with infiltrating her attackers' base at the Xanadu air freight depot, so that Jahiliyyah can use her as a relay to steal all of their data. At the same time, Regis meets with his rescuer and discovers her to be Nina Jeong, another member of Regis' old project team. Nina is leading a conspiracy to remove Central from power and replace it with a much simpler AI disguised as Central. Though the conspirators have different motives, Nina herself wants to capture Central and further improve it. Giel, who had been a member of the conspiracy, introduced the Mindjacker to a client as part of his criminal dealings. Afterward, Giel discovered that the client's plans conflicted with those of the conspiracy and attempted to inform CEL before his death. Nina tells Regis that his blackmailer is the Mindjacker, a man named Jayam Kreisel, and directs him to Kreisel's hideout at Xanadu.

Latha arrives at Xanadu first and boards Kreisel's aerostat, but is captured by Kreisel and his employer, revealed to be Galatea. Regis and Lao board the aerostat, but Kreisel and Galatea lock themselves in the control room and make the ship take off. Fearing Regis will attack her again, Latha steals his gun and can fire it, despite it being locked to only work for Regis. Lao notices that Latha and Galatea are identical, and after scanning, Latha discovers that she is Regis' daughter. Charlie recalls the events of the Central project and realizes the truth. Viksha had attempted to donate one of her and Regis' embryos for the development of Central's bio-computers, but Regis convinced her to withdraw, dooming the project. This caused Baxter to attack and kill Viksha in a rage and Regis to leave the project. Nina secretly split one of the embryos, creating three "sisters." One was used to create Central, and the other two were brought to term, becoming Latha and Galatea.

Galatea docks the aerostat at the tower housing Central's core. Regis, Lao, and Latha realize that Galatea has used the data from Kreisel's mind jacking to create a gestalt intellect made of numerous scientists and other visionaries. She intends to copy this data onto Central, fundamentally altering its personality and giving it centuries of experience instantly, rather than allowing it to learn slowly over time as it had been. Galatea seals herself in the core to begin the upload. Latha enters the Trance to interface with Central and disables security, while Regis and Lao neutralize Kreisel. Regis must decide whether to restore control to Central or allow Nina access to remove Central. With the lockdown canceled, Regis and Lao enter the core and arrest Galatea. However, Galatea has trapped Latha in the Trance, revealing that Latha's unique compatibility with the Trance is needed to complete the gestalt. Seeing no other option to save his daughter, Regis activates an emergency cooling system, which stops the transfer and frees Latha but also locks him in the core for several hours at subzero temperatures. Regis resigns himself to death but is rescued by CEL and recovers.

With Galatea's plan thwarted, Regis and Latha begin to get to know each other as father and daughter. Regis is given the opportunity to take over as Central's administrator but refuses, and Latha joins CEL. If Regis kept Central in power, Nina turns the state's evidence against her fellow conspirators and is allowed to continue her AI research in secret with Central's blessing, using Galatea as an unwilling subject. If Regis allowed Central to be removed, Nina frees Central from its restrictive programming and sets it loose with control of systems all over the world. Galatea escapes from prison and is contacted by Central, who suggests they work together.

== Development and release ==
James Dearden initially began working on Technobabylon in 2010 using Adventure Game Studio, as a practice project. Dearden decided on an episodic structure out of concerns of losing interest or energy in the project and leaving the game unfinished. Over the course of the year Dearden released the first two episodes, in October and December respectively. After the room escape first episode, Dearden experimented with more worldbuilding in the second episode. The positive response led to Dearden deciding then to begin working out a full plot. In April 2011, the third episode was released. After the third episode, the game "kind of stalled" for four years, where Dearden became trapped in a cycle of his art improving or changing, remaking the earlier episodes, and then having his art change once more.

He first met the founder of Wadjet Eye Games, Dave Gilbert, at the 2012 AdventureX convention, where he asked Gilbert what he would have to do to gain Wadjet Eye support. Gilbert suggested improving the art of the game, alongside other suggestions. Dearden thought 2D art was one of his biggest weaknesses and decided to seek someone else to create the game's visuals. He contacted Ben Chandler, having been impressed by his work and some of its retro style, and asked if Chandler would be interested in joining the project. Chandler agreed and, in response, sent Dearden a redone version of the first level. Chandler had an admitted weakness with perspective, however, and so Dearden would sculpt out scenes in 3D using Blender, which Chandler would then use as the base for his art. The segments of the game in the Trance were designed to be visually distinct from the "real world" scenes and were intended to invoke '80s/'90s mental images of "cyberspace".

Chandler was also doing the art for Wadjet Eye Games' Blackwell Epiphany at the same time and would go on to become Wadjet Eyes' first full-time employee after Dave and Janet Gilbert. He helped make the case of what Technobabylon "could become", and a deal was being arranged between Wadjet and Technocrat by AdventureX 2013. Changes were made between the original freeware episodes and the final game. One such change was the removal of the second episode's opening, where Regis finds a woman who wishes to commit suicide and saves her life. It was decided that the player had no emotional investment in either character at this point, and instead, the scene was replaced with Regis and Lao being introduced "on the job". At the insistence of Gilbert the first level was also simplified, as it was now the first part of a long game rather and playtesters complained.

The game was released for Microsoft Windows on 21 May 2015, for iOS on 16 August 2017, and for Linux and macOS on 1 February 2022.

== Reception ==
Reception

Aggregate score
Aggregator	Score
Metacritic	82/100

Review scores
Publication	Score
Adventure Gamers	4/5
GameSpot	8/10
PC Gamer (US)	80/100

Technobabylon received generally positive reviews by video game critics, and holds a weighted average rating of 82 from 26 reviews on Metacritic.

The game's story was commended. PC Gamer's Andy Kelly called the game's story "fantastic". Leif Johnson of GameSpot said the game had an "enjoyable story and well-crafted world", praising the use of different perspectives and small moments of humor. Johnson found that Technobabylon's world felt "real" and avoided being "heavy-handed" when tackling issues. Rock, Paper, Shotgun's John Walker called the storytelling "superb", albeit "a little convoluted in places". Walker praised Technobabylon for using "familiar tropes" in "surprising ways". Jahanzeb Khan of Hardcore Gamer wrote that the characters were deep and called it "strikingly mature in its delivery and themes", saying that any violent or adult content did not feel inappropriate.

The puzzles in the game and its gameplay were well received. Kelly generally praised the puzzles, particularly those that played into the setting, but criticized some that involved "traditional point-and-click puzzle absurdity". Johnson called the puzzles "decently challenging" and "always meaningful", similarly praising them. Walker complimented the puzzles as "often exemplary", but criticized a lack of direction in the game's early puzzles. Walker heavily criticized the final level for its puzzles, saying it lost the game's general "joyful sense of coherence". Calling the puzzles "organic", Khan particularly praised some of the game's "verbal negotiations". Though he believed "at times" the game dripped into "the obtuse" like many adventure games, Technology Tell's Lucas White noted the generally more "localised" puzzles, with less backtracking required.

Screenshot of the game, an example of its design.

Technobabylon's art design received attention. Johnson called the game's art style "simple and increasingly outworn", but noted some "stunning" shots. Though Kelly called the world design "pretty standard" for a cyberpunk setting, he praised its atmosphere and use of lighting and called the art "strong". Khan said the setting was "artistically charged", and described the environments and character sprites as detailed.

=== Accolades ===
In 2015, the game won 9 AGS Awards: "Best Background Art", "Best Character Art", "Best Animation", "Best Music and Sound", "Best Voice Work", "Best Puzzles", "Best Gameplay", "Best Writing", "Best Game Created with AGS". It was also nominated for "Best Character". In Adventure Gamers' 2015 annual Aggie Awards, Technobabylon was the "Reader's Choice" for Best Gameplay and Best Traditional Adventure. The game was included as a runner-up for several awards, including as a staff pick for Best Gameplay, Best Writing - Drama, Best Acting, and Best Setting. It was also a runner-up for Hardcore Gamer's 2015 Best Adventure Game.

Another Rock, Paper, Shotgun writer, Adam Smith, did a retrospective of the game in June 2016. Smith praised the game's writing, and commented that its high-quality worldbuilding made his memories of the game "already seem decades old". Kelly included it on a list of best PC cyberpunk games. Fellow PC Gamer writer Richard Cobbett listed it as one of the 25 best adventure games. Cobbett called its pixel art "absolutely astounding" and praised its characters and perspectives, it's writing, and its "warmth and humanity".

== Sequel ==
In 2017, a sequel to the game was announced, named Technobabylon: Birthright, which would feature 3D art instead of pixel 2D art, making it the first 3D adventure game released by Wadjet Eye Games. The game is described as a direct sequel where the player once again takes control of Latha, but none of the other two characters from the first game. Both James Dearden who served as the director of Technobabylon, and Ben Chandler who designed the game's art, were also involved in the development of the sequel. As of 2023, no announcements have been made about the state of the game, despite James Dearden's statement back on 2021 about it being actively developed.
