= The Blackwell Deception =

2011 video game

- Developer: Wadjet Eye Games
- Publisher: Wadjet Eye Games
- Designer: Dave Gilbert
- Composer: Thomas Regin
- Series: Blackwell
- Engine: Adventure Game Studio
- Platforms: Windows, iOS, Linux, macOS
- Release: October 12, 2011 (Windows); September 24, 2015 (iOS)
- Genre: Adventure
- Mode: Single-player

The Blackwell Deception is a 2011 graphic adventure game developed and published by Wadjet Eye Games. It is the fourth entry in the Blackwell series, preceded directly by The Blackwell Convergence.

== Plot ==
The Blackwell Deception focuses on Rosa and Joey again and takes place some time after the third game. Rosa receives a call from a former co-worker asking to investigate a case for him. She soon finds out that he has been murdered while investigating a contact given by a psychic Lisa Tenzin. Rosa then proceeds to solve two more murder cases and finds out that Lisa had referred both to a man named Gavin. She confronts the psychic about their deaths and it turns out Gavin had brainwashed her into helping him. Gavin has in fact been "feeding" on their energy to remain immortal. Gavin then captures Rosa and kills Lisa who tries to escape. He brainwashes Rosa into trapping Joey and tries to feed on her. However, Joey escapes and manages to bring Rosa to her senses. As she breaks Gavin's ritual of feeding on her, she accidentally kills him. Since Gavin fed on a large number of souls he tries to resurrect himself but Lisa's ghost distracts him. Rosa takes advantage and drags him as well as Lisa's soul to the gates where someone unseen stops Gavin from moving on and, in order to punish Gavin for failing his mission, somehow destroys his soul. After Lisa's departure Rosa, confused by her purpose, decides to track down the organization that was behind Gavin and found a full scale "Ghost Investigation" agency.

== Development ==
The game was released on October 12, 2011. An updated version was released on October 31, 2013. Notably, this version changed the character portraits from the original comic-style, to a more realistic style matching the other games in the series.

== Reception ==
Reception

Aggregate score
Aggregator	Score
Metacritic	73/100

Review scores
Publication	Score
GamePro	3.5/5
PC PowerPlay	7/10
Gameblog	3/5
