= Blackwell Unbound =

2007 video game

- Developer: Wadjet Eye Games
- Publisher: Wadjet Eye Games
- Designer: Dave Gilbert
- Artist: Erin Robinson
- Composer: Thomas Regin
- Series: Blackwell
- Engine: Adventure Game Studio
- Platforms: Windows, Android, iOS, Linux, macOS
- Release: September 4, 2007 (Windows); 2014 (ports)
- Genre: Adventure
- Mode: Single-player

Blackwell Unbound is a 2007 graphic adventure game developed and published by Wadjet Eye Games. It is the sequel to The Blackwell Legacy, and the second entry in the Blackwell series.

== Plot ==
The second game is a prequel to Legacy and follows the investigations of Rosa's aunt Lauren Blackwell and Joey back in the 70s. They investigate two ghosts – a murdered saxophone player and a murdered woman haunting a construction site of her old apartment building. While investigating the two seemingly unrelated incidents, Lauren discovers that both ghosts have been murdered by the same elderly, homeless woman that calls herself The Countess. She claims that she is a medium like Lauren and is also helping the people move on. However, because she is targeting humans who are still alive as opposed to actual ghosts, it quickly becomes clear that she is mad and needs to be stopped. The duo tries to catch her multiple times, but Lauren, being a chain smoker, is unable to keep up with the surprisingly agile old woman, and the Countess escapes every time.

Lauren and Joey are puzzled by The Countess' claims about being a medium, due to the obvious lack of a spirit guide accompanying her. The two eventually learn that the Countess is using New Yorker journalist Joseph Mitchell as a spirit guide substitute and kills whoever he writes about. Mitchell eventually made the connection himself, and stopped writing altogether out of fear of getting anyone else killed. Lauren then convinces Mitchell to write about her to lure The Countess out of hiding. The Countess arrives at Lauren's apartment, and attempts to kill Lauren by choking her. Lauren eventually overpowers the Countess by tossing her off of her balcony. After her near-death experience, Lauren decides to get in touch with her estranged brother again, despite Joey's misgivings about it.

== Development ==
As with Legacy, Unbound uses the Adventure Game Studio engine. Unbound was originally supposed to be a flashback sequence in the next game, The Blackwell Convergence, but it grew so large that it became a game in its own right.

The story features a real person as a character: writer Joseph Mitchell of the New Yorker.

The game was released on September 4, 2007 for Windows. Ports for other platforms were released in 2014.

== Reception ==
Reception

Aggregate score
Aggregator	Score
GameRankings	85%

Review scores
Publication	Score
Adventure Gamers	3.5/5
GameZone	8.5/10
Just Adventure	A
GameZebo	3.5/5

The game was nominated for Best Story and won Best Music in the AGS Awards for games released in 2007.
