= The Shivah =

2006 video game

- Cover image of The Shivah
- Developer: Wadjet Eye Games
- Publisher: Wadjet Eye Games
- Designer: Dave Gilbert
- Engine: Adventure Game Studio
- Platforms: Microsoft Windows, MacOS, iOS, Linux, Android
- Release: August 14, 2006; Kosher Edition: WW: November 21, 2013 (iOS, macOS, PC); WW: April 8, 2014 (Linux); WW: April 9, 2014 (Android)
- Genre: Adventure
- Mode: Single player

The Shivah is a point-and-click adventure game from 2006, designed and developed by Dave Gilbert with the assistance of others, including voice actors and artists. It is notable in that it features a rabbi as its protagonist and explores themes related to the Jewish faith. In 2013, the game was remastered in an updated version entitled The Shivah: Kosher Edition, which features new graphics and music, and re-recorded voice-overs.

== Gameplay ==
A gameplay screenshot from The Shivah

The Shivah is a third person point-and-click adventure game. The player uses the mouse to select objects from the character's surroundings to interact with, as well as other characters with whom to speak. When in dialogue with another character, a portrait of them appears in the corner of the screen. Rather than specifically choosing what their character will say next, the player selects from a number of options along the lines of 'calm response' and 'Rabbinical response', the latter of which always involves responding to a question with another question. There are several points at which the player character can be killed, though in such instances the player is quickly returned to the moment before making the fatal choice. The game also features a scene involving combat that the player must win by making the correct dialogue choices, similar to the insult swordfighting of The Secret of Monkey Island. There are many tie-ins to The Blackwell Series, also by Gilbert. Many of the characters and names appeared later in Blackwell games, and in The Kosher Edition the main character of Blackwell series, Rosangela Blackwell, makes a cameo.

== Plot ==
Greg Costikyan, creator of Manifesto Games, stated that "the basic theme is the nature of morality."

The game takes place in Manhattan, New York City. The playable character is Russell Stone, a hard-hearted Rabbi experiencing a crisis of faith compounded by his synagogue's declining membership and financial woes. The police inform him that a former member of the synagogue, Jack Lauder, has been murdered. The police suspect Stone, as Jack's will left Stone more than $10,000, despite an acrimonious falling out the two had eight years prior when Stone refused to conduct an interfaith marriage between Jack and his wife Raj. Puzzled at being left the money and wanting to clear his name, Stone sets out to investigate Jack's murder himself.

He begins by paying a Shivah visit to Raj, who points him to their family business. In his investigations, Stone learns that Jack had been visiting another synagogue run by Rabbi Amos Zelig, who was willing to conduct the interfaith marriage. In an email intended to be sent to Stone, Jack revealed that time tempered his hatred for Stone and that he desired to reconnect with him. At Zelig's synagogue, Jack met a man named Ethan Goldberg, who he hired as an accountant for his business. Goldberg, who was also murdered recently, discouraged Jack from accepting money from an investor, but due to his business's struggling finances, Jack accepted it anyway, and began making repayments to a man named Joe DeMarco.

Stone uncovers that this investor was Zelig himself. He confronts DeMarco, who admits to committing the murders on Zelig's behalf, revealing the latter's connections to organized crime. Zelig would find struggling business owners, introduce them to DeMarco who was a loanshark associated with the mafia, and would also murder those who failed to pay. After subduing DeMarco, the player can choose whether or not to kill him.

Realizing Stone is on to him, Zelig takes Raj hostage to bait him. Depending on the player's actions in the final confrontation, Zelig and/or Raj may die, and this leads to a variety of different endings.

- If the player kills Zelig by throwing him off the balcony, police rule his death a suicide, and Stone is kept out of suspicion but his crisis of faith continues. If Raj survives in this scenario, she will never speak to Stone again, having witnessed him commit murder.
- If Raj is killed but Zelig is spared, Stone is taken in for questioning on suspicion of Jack and now Raj's murder (as well as Zelig's false testimony). He hopes that Jack's money will help cover his legal fees.
- If both Raj and Zelig survive, the former's testimony helps clear Stone's name and the latter is arrested for his crimes. Stone is now less cynical of his faith and is able to clear his debts with Jack's money, and is visited by Raj.

== Development ==
The game was originally developed for the Monthly Adventure Game Studio 5th anniversary competition in June 2006, which it won. Gilbert went on to form Wadjet Eye Games through which to publish his games, then improved the game substantially, making it longer, with voice acting, DVD-style commentary and extra puzzles. In September 2006 the game went on sale via the Internet from the Wadjet Eye Games site and from Manifesto Games.

== Reception ==
Reception

Aggregate score
Aggregator	Score	
Aggregator	iOS	PC
Metacritic	82/100	(K.E.) 67/100

Review scores
Publication	Score	
Publication	iOS	PC
Adventure Gamers	N/A	4/5
Destructoid	N/A	(K.E.) 7/10
Gamezebo	4/5	3/5
Hyper	8/10	N/A
MacLife	4.5/5	N/A
PC Gamer (UK)	N/A	(K.E.) 72% 70%
PC PowerPlay	N/A	6/10
Pocket Gamer	4.5/5	N/A
RPGFan	80%	(K.E.) 78%
The A.V. Club	N/A	B
Digital Spy	4/5	N/A

The iOS version received "favorable" reviews, while the PC Kosher Edition received "average" reviews, according to the review aggregation website Metacritic. The A.V. Club gave the original game a B and stated that, "The Shivah fits a compelling moral conscience over a tight decision tree, and compared to sillier interactive fiction like Phoenix Wright: Ace Attorney or Hotel Dusk, its rewards are subtler, and more satisfying." Digital Spy gave the iOS version four stars out of five, saying that it "was overlooked by most players upon its initial release in 2006, but adventure game fans would be making a huge mistake to let that happen a second time to this wonderfully written murder mystery." However, The Digital Fix gave the PC version's Kosher Edition seven out of ten, saying that it "turns out to be an extremely short game, completable in between one or two hours, and this includes the time taken to see all three possible endings." Much of the media coverage focused on the unique choice of a Rabbi as the game's protagonist.

In 2006, The Shivah won an Adventure Game Studios for Best Dialogue Writing and Gilbert won the Lifetime Achievement Award. The Shivah came 2nd in Game Tunnel's Sound award for 2006 and 3rd in their Adventure/Quest/Platform Game of the Year awards.
