= Diamonds in the Rough (video game) =

2008 video game

- PC box cover.
- Developer(s): Atropos Studios
- Publisher(s): Atropos Studios
- Designer(s): Alkis Polyrakis
- Programmer(s): Alkis Polyrakis
- Artist(s): Jura Kalinkin
- Writer(s): Alkis Polyrakis
- Composer(s): Nikolas Sideris
- Engine: AGS
- Platform(s): Microsoft Windows
- Release: WW: March 17, 2008
- Genre(s): Adventure
- Mode(s): Single-player

Diamonds in the Rough is a 3D point-and-click adventure video game for Microsoft Windows, developed by Greek indie developer Alkis Polyrakis and published under his now defunct Atropos Studios.

== Gameplay ==
Diamonds in the Rough is a 3D adventure game played from a third-person perspective. The game uses a point-and-click interface made popular by Sierra graphic adventure game series, requiring players to right-click to select from a list of available actions and then left-click to perform the intended interactions of the protagonist, Jason Hart with the environment. Puzzles in the game are predominantly inventory-based, relying on the player to collect items that may be combined with other items, used on the environment, or given to non-player characters. Using this feature, the game often requires certain interactions to have been made before the story can progress further.

A notable feature explored in Diamonds in the Rough is the 'thoughts' panel, a secondary inventory presented as a notice board and representing Jason's internal thoughts. These thoughts, represented by post-it notes pinned on the board can be treated like inventory items, as players can use them on other objects, people and even other thoughts on the board in order to unlock new insights, dialogue options or even solve puzzles and problems.

== Plot ==
In Diamonds in the Rough, players take control of 20-year-old Jason Hart, a high school dropout working as an office boy. He is approached one day by a mysterious man claiming to represent a mysterious organization called "Diamonds in the Rough", one that recruits people who they believe possess extraordinary abilities, such as telepathy or telekinesis. Jason is chosen for his ability to apparently never choose poorly when presented with multiple options. He ends up signing a five-year contract with "DitR", and is relocated to a town in the Midwest controlled by the organization along with other 'gifted' people, so as to participate in a seemingly harmless study. However, Jason soon comes to question his employers' motives, and embarks on a quest to discover the true purpose of the organization.

== Development ==
Diamonds in the Rough was the second game developed by Alkis Polyrakis, following Other Worlds, an adventure game Polyrakis released for free in 2004. Development on Diamonds in the Rough took roughly two-and-a-half years, with Polyrakis himself writing the story and taking care of programming, with Jura Kalinkin in charge of graphics and Nikolas Sideris in charge of music, sound effects and sound engineering. The project was funded by Polyrakis himself.

Diamonds in the Rough was the last game to be developed by Polyrakis and his Atropos Studios however, as despite favorable reviews and adequate sales, the game failed to attract any investors, leading to Atropos' shut-down.

== Reception ==
Diamonds in the Rough received "generally favorable" reviews from both critics and gamers.

Alexander Tait of Just Adventure gave the game an A Grade, stating Diamonds in the Rough is "arguably the most important adventure game I have encountered". Gustavo Calvo-Simmons of Adventure Classic Gaming game the game 4 out of 5 stars, stating "Diamonds in the Rough has taken the development of indie adventure games to a new level of standards - which other indie developers will surely emulate for years to come". Four Fat Chicks gave the game a favorable review, praising it as "one of the finest adventure games of the last few years and clearly the best independently developed adventure I've ever had the pleasure of playing".

Adventure Gamers on the other hand gave the game 3.5 stars out of 5, stating that the game "is based on an interesting premise, but its generally dull implementation prevents it from realizing its potential. Indie fans may find it worth a look, but others may want to think twice". The magazine's readers however, voted Diamonds in the Rough as the Best Independent Adventure of 2008.
