= Jennifer Hepler =

Canadian video game developer

Jennifer Brandes Hepler is a video game developer, author, and scriptwriter. She first came to attention for her time at game developer BioWare, in Edmonton, Alberta, where she worked as a senior writer for eight years, with much of her work centered on the Dragon Age fantasy role-playing video game franchise. Hepler's notable works after she left BioWare in 2013 include the mobile strategy video game Game of Thrones Ascent, and the 2018 point-and-click adventure game Unavowed.

== Career ==
Hepler spent a large portion of her time in high school writing and selling short stories. During her college years, she met Chris Hepler and developed an interest in doing professional writing for role-playing games after being introduced to Vampire: The Masquerade and Shadowrun. Together they co-wrote sourcebooks for Shadowrun, Earthdawn and Paranoia, and later worked as scriptwriters in Hollywood for six years. A notable project Hepler contributed to was CBS Television’s The Agency.

Hepler eventually met BioWare representatives at the Game Developers Conference one year, and commenced employment at BioWare from 2005 onwards. Hepler worked with the first three mainline titles in the Dragon Age franchise, starting with 2009's Dragon Age: Origins. Hepler was responsible for developing dwarven civilization and culture in the Dragon Age setting, Thedas, and wrote the origin stories of dwarven player characters as well as the narrative for the Deep Roads region. Hepler said she wanted the setting's dwarven culture to reflect the dichotomies between extreme wealth and power, to extreme poverty and disenfranchisement. Origins was a critical and commercial success, with particular praise for its story and characters. In subsequent sequels to Origins, Hepler's writing contributions for notable Dragon Age characters include Anders and Cassandra Pentaghast. Hepler was also involved with writing work for multiple questlines in the massively multiplayer online role-playing game (MMORPG) Star Wars: The Old Republic.

Following Hepler's departure from BioWare, she became the lead writer of Game of Thrones Ascent. Hepler was at one point attached to write for Ambrov X, an episodic RPG set in the Sime~Gen Universe, provided a funding stretch goal on Kickstarter was met. She was one of the contributors for the 2015 book The Game Narrative Toolbox, which discuss the role of a narrative designer on a video game development team. She later joined Kognito, a health simulation company which develops apps that utilizes interactive conversations for the purposes of educating, motivating and helping clients. In 2016, she is credited as the editor for Women in Game Development: Breaking the Glass Level-Cap, a book which discuss the experiences of female videogame developers about their work as well as the harassment and hostility they sometimes receive from end users of the products they contributed to. Hepler is credited as story co-designer for 2018 video game Unavowed.

From February 2020 through November 2021, Hepler worked at Pixelberry Studios as a senior writer. She then worked from December 2021 through June 2025 as a Lead Writer, then Writing Director at Thought Pennies. As of June 2025, Hepler has worked at Blizzard Entertainment as Narrative Director for Diablo V.

== Writing style ==
Hepler described writing as a "generally a solitary profession", and that she used to spend much of her youth at home in front of a computer writing scripts with little to no social interaction.

In a 2006 interview, Hepler noted that some combat-oriented games allow players to skip cutscenes and story moments to reach fighting sequences sooner. She discussed the possibility of a role-playing game which allows players the option to bypass combat in favor of story moments, and reasoned that building up relationships among her companion characters and the world around them is more interesting than trading blows with enemy units. Her comments inspired Wadjet Eye Games founder Dave Gilbert to develop a role-playing game without combat mechanics, which eventually became Unavowed.

== Harassment ==
Following the release of Dragon Age II, which received a divisive reaction from players, Hepler was targeted for harassment due to her work on the game. In particular, her comments about gameplay and narrative design from the 2006 interview were used out of its original context by some harassers to justify their behavior. According to Hepler, she had received death threats not only to herself, but also to her family and children. In response to the harassment, Bioware publicly condemned the harassers and supported Hepler. On one occasion, the company donated a thousand dollars to a Canadian anti-bullying charity set up in Hepler's name.

By August 2013 it was announced that Hepler was leaving BioWare, with widespread coverage initially linking her departure to the harassment she had faced. Hepler promptly clarified that she left due to family reasons, and also to work on a book and to pursue work as a freelance game writer and consultant. During a 2016 interview conducted by Polygon staff, Hepler explained that she was no longer interested in writing work for video game projects which she believed psychologically rewarded players who were attacking her with gameplay that allowed them to do the same things they did to her in real life.

== Personal life ==
Hepler is married to video game developer and longtime collaborator Chris Hepler, who is also a former BioWare employee.

== Works ==
=== Television ===
- The Agency (2001–2003), CBS.

=== Video games ===
- Dragon Age: Origins (2009), Electronic Arts, Inc.
- Dragon Age: Origins – Awakening (2010), Electronic Arts, Inc.
- Dragon Age II (2011), Electronic Arts, Inc.
- Star Wars: The Old Republic (2011), Electronic Arts, Inc.
- Game of Thrones Ascent (2013), Disruptor Beam
- Dragon Age: Inquisition (2014), Electronic Arts, Inc.
- Unavowed (2018), Wadjet Eye Games

=== Books ===
- Shadowrun Companion: Beyond the Shadows (1996), FASA.
- Ork Nation of Cara Fahd (Earthdawn RPG) (1998), FASA.
- A Complex of Dimness Adventure for Paranoia, Creatures of the Nightcycle Paperback (1998), West End Games.
- Cyberpirates: A Shadowrun Sourcebook (1998), FASA.
- M.I.T.H.: Operation Smoking Jaguar (2005), Image Comics.
- Nations of Barsaive 3: Cara Fahd (2011), RedBrick (Mongoose Publishing).
- The Game Narrative Toolbox (2015), CRC Press.
- Women in Game Development: Breaking the Glass Level-Cap (2016), CRC Press.

== See also ==
- Gamergate controversy, an online harassment campaign which targeted female video game developers
