= Strangeland (video game) =

- Developer: Wormwood Studios
- Publisher: Wadjet Eye Games
- Designer: Mark Yohalem
- Programmer: James Spanos
- Artists: Victor Pflug, Daniel Miller
- Writer: Mark Yohalem
- Composers: Victor Pflug, James Spanos
- Platform: Microsoft Windows
- Release: May 25, 2021
- Genre: Adventure
- Mode: Single-player

Strangeland is a psychological horror point-and-click adventure video game developed by Wormwood Studios and published by Wadjet Eye Games. It was released for the Microsoft Windows on May 25, 2021. The game draws inspiration from many sources, such as Nordic mythology and the American drama television series Twin Peaks.

== Plot ==
The game follows the story of Stranger, a man who finds himself in an unfamiliar, fragmented world that resembles an abandoned carnival. While exploring, Stranger meets a golden-haired woman. Almost immediately, she throws herself down a well right in front of him. The other residents of the carnival insist that death works differently here; the woman may be dead, but she is not gone. Not only that: she keeps dying over and over again for Stranger's sake. Soon after, Stranger dies as well. He gets brought back to the same spot he first appeared in. When he reaches the well, the golden-haired woman is there again; and, just like before, she jumps to her death.

While exploring the nightmarish carnival he found himself in, Stranger discovers The Dark Thing. In order to save the golden-haired woman from a cycle of continuous death, he must destroy it. Eventually, Stranger manages to reach the top of a rollercoaster, where The Dark Thing is caged. While attempting to kill it, he releases it instead. Freed, The Dark Thing knocks him off the rollercoaster and begins to methodically kill all other inhabitants of Strangeland, attacking them one by one. By the time the Stranger manages to make his way back up the rollercoaster, he is one of the few living beings left.

On the tracks of the rollercoaster, Stranger is attacked by a giant crab; it is implied to be another form The Dark Thing took in order to stop him. He manages to defeat the creature, but loses his head in the process. When he wakes back up, he is in a place called Deadland – a distorted version of the world he was just in. Stranger's body was separated from his head during his confrontation with the monstrous crab. Once he manages to recover it, he sets out to try and find his way out of Deadland. He realizes that a lot of the previous inhabitants of the carnival have been replaced by twisted versions of himself.

Once again, Stranger is led to the top of the rollercoaster. Except this time, instead of The Dark Thing, the cage holds the woman he has been looking for. Her golden hair is gone entirely. When he frees her from the cage, The Dark Thing appears again. It has taken the form of a man and begins to teleport Stranger from place to place, recounting his mistakes and regrets. Once Stranger manages to break free, he finds himself on a floating island with both the woman and The Dark Thing. It is revealed that the woman was Stranger's lover – and that she has been dead, truly dead, this whole time. During the final confrontation, the woman tries to inspire hope in Stranger, while The Dark Thing continues to try to break his resolve.

The game has four possible endings. Three of them result in Stranger's death. In one, he jumps off the island, in another, he stabs himself, and in the third, he attempts to fight The Dark Thing, only to lose. Stranger manages to escape Deadland in only one of the endings. His only chance to escape is not to lose hope and accept the fact that the golden-haired woman is already dead.

== Gameplay ==
Strangeland’s gameplay focuses on point-and-click puzzles, some of which have multiple different solutions. In order to find solutions, the player has to interact with the world of the game as much as possible. Left-clicking on objects makes Stranger interact with them. Right-clicking allows the player to examine them instead. All available tools and items are accessible from a drop-down panel found at the top of the screen.

== Reception ==
Strangeland received an overall positive reception with a few mixed reviews from larger sites. Adventure Gamers praised the game's writing: “Strangeland is smartly written, and its strongest aspect is how it uses real-world concepts as physical manifestations to create a compelling enigma”.

Strangeland won three of the site's Reader's Choice awards for Best Story, Best Setting and Best Writing (Drama).

In 2022, it won four Adventure Game Studio awards: Best Character Art, Best Puzzles, Best Voice Over and Best Programming. Additionally, it received the AGOTY Game of the Year and Best Screenplay awards, as well as Best Point-and-Click Adventure of 2021 from the German indie game magazine Welcome to Last Week.

However, a few sites criticized the game. PCGamer wrote: “The narrative is strong and dark, but the game beneath it struggles to keep up”.

On Metacritic, Strangeland received an overall rating of 77/100.
