= Wadjet eye =

Wadjet eye may refer to:

- The Eye of Horus, which is sometimes known as a Wadjet Eye
- Wadjet Eye Games, an indie video game developer that specializes in point and click adventure games
