= The Blackwell Epiphany =

2014 video game

- Developer: Wadjet Eye Games
- Publisher: Wadjet Eye Games
- Designer: Dave Gilbert
- Artist: Ben Chandler
- Composer: Thomas Regin
- Series: Blackwell
- Engine: Adventure Game Studio
- Platforms: Windows, Linux, macOS, iOS
- Release: April 24, 2014; February 18, 2016 (iOS)
- Genre: Adventure
- Mode: Single-player

The Blackwell Epiphany is a 2014 graphic adventure game developed and published by Wadjet Eye Games. It is the fifth and final game in the Blackwell series.

== Plot ==
The story starts off with Rosa investigating a condemned building. After freeing a soul, Rosa witnesses a man named George Ostin being shot dead. George's ghost pleads for Rosa's help, knowing that she's a legitimate spirit medium, but before Rosa can take any action, George's ghost is ripped apart by an unknown force.

Rosa investigates George's death and, through the trail of several other ghosts, uncovers the existence of a church-based self-help group known as the Grace Group. Every member is in danger of dying or already dead, and their ghosts are in danger of being torn apart by an unknown force instead of moving on. With the help of Madeline, the former spirit guide of the Countess, Rosa and Joey are able to protect most of the souls. Later, however, Madeline betrays everyone by revealing that she had been ripping the souls herself to absorb them and gain their life force, and that she had targeted the Grace Group because their souls were exceptionally weak. Madeline explains that she wants nothing more than to end her several centuries of thankless work as a spirit guide, and intends to return to life because she cannot pass on. She absorbs the souls of the remaining Grace Group members and possesses Rosa's body, effectively returning to life. Joey is able to extract Madeline from Rosa's body, but in doing so, Rosa's mind becomes overloaded with "the knowledge of the universe", and is driven insane the same way as her aunt and grandmother before her. Madeline reveals that she was responsible for driving the other Blackwell women insane by attempting to possess them, but failing due to her insufficient life force and the emotional weakness of the host. Madeline's occupancy then departure would cause the universe to fill the void left behind and overstimulate the mediums' senses.

Rosa is placed in solitary confinement at Bellevue Mental Hospital. With the help of Joey and the ghost of her late aunt, Rosa gains temporary control over her immense knowledge, and explains that Madeline is now threatening to wipe out all life in New York in an attempt to forcibly vaporize her own soul by drawing in the power of the universe through a portal. Rosa and Joey escape the hospital, and confront Madeline. Rosa takes control of the portal and subsequently allows every departed soul currently in the world to flow through her and pass on, Madeline and her aunt included. Joey, however, is still unable to pass on. The portal closes. Rosa, losing control of her mind again, decides to pass her life force to Joey with her remaining power. Joey's body becomes corporeal as he is properly alive again, and Rosa dies.

The end scene shows Joey spreading Rosa's ashes over the docks where Rosa had spread her aunt's ashes at the beginning of the series. Joey monologues about how he has tried to look for spirits to help since Rosa's death by investigating the scene of a recent highway accident following rumors of disembodied screams and cries, but finds that he is no longer able to hear and see ghosts like before. Uncertain of what to do now that he is just a regular human again, Joey merely concludes that "life is worth living", and promises to live it out fully to honor Rosa's sacrifice.

== Development ==
The Blackwell Epiphany was revealed in December 2012. It was released on April 24, 2014.

== Reception ==
Reception

Aggregate score
Aggregator	Score
Metacritic	83/100

Review scores
Publication	Score
Adventure Gamers	4.5/5
PC Gamer (US)	82/100

Awards
Publication	Award
Adventure Gamers	Best Adventure of 2014 (2015)
Adventure Gamers	Best Traditional Adventure (2015)
Adventure Gamers	Best Story (2015)

The game received critical acclaim, and won numerous awards from websites such as Adventure Game Studio and Adventure Gamers.

Adventure Gamers praised all aspects of the game, in particular the storytelling - other than finding in the second half the pacing uneven, the final twist "out of left field" and some plot resolutions rushed - and said that Dave Gilbert "has a great eye for the everyday dramas of life and many of his characters are memorable" and that Gilbert had progressed far as a writer since the series' first installment. PC Gamer US declared it "the high-point of a consistently strong series".
