= Shardlight =

2016 video game

- Developers: Francisco Gonzalez; Ben Chandler
- Publisher: Wadjet Eye Games
- Artist: Ben Chandler
- Writer: Francisco Gonzalez
- Composer: Nathaniel Chambers
- Engine: Adventure Game Studio
- Platforms: Microsoft Windows, iOS
- Release: Microsoft Windows; March 8, 2016 iOS; March 8, 2017
- Genre: Adventure game
- Mode: Single-player

Shardlight is an adventure game developed by Francisco Gonzalez and Ben Chandler and published by Wadjet Eye Games for the PC Windows in 2016.

== Gameplay ==
Shardlight is a graphic adventure game, where the player controls a character to explore the environment and interact with people and objects as to solve puzzles. When in dialogue with another character, a portrait of them appears in the corner of the screen and the player can often decide what the protagonist will say. The responses and actions from other characters can change based on what the player chooses, and near the end of the game the dialogue options determine which one of the three endings will play.

== Setting ==
Shardlight is set in November in a post-apocalyptic city, 20 years after World War III. The world is left devastated and the sky has turned brown. Little shards of uranium glass are spread everywhere and emit a glowing green light; the main source of artificial light in the city. Furthermore, a deadly disease costs the lives of many: Green Lung. There is no permanent cure for Green Lung, only a temporary vaccine that has to be renewed on a regular basis to be effective and that only the rich can afford. In a lottery, poor people have the chance to win the vaccine. The city is ruled by Aristocrats, a faceless oligarchy that controls all resources and have unchallenged authority.

== Plot ==
Amy Wellard suffers from Green Lung and is on a so-called lottery job, repairing a reactor, in order to receive a lottery ticket. In the underground reactor base she finds a man who has been crushed under some rubble that came down from the ceiling. Amy puts him out of his misery, but before that he gives her a letter for someone named Danton. She returns to the Ministry of Energy where she receives her lottery ticket from the head of the aristocracy, Tiberius. When she tells him about the letter from the dying man, he orders her to deliver it. Amy finds the secret hideout of Danton and her rebel cause; she delivers the letter. When she tells Tiberius about that, he asks her to become a spy and find out what the rebels plan. As she is interested in the vaccine, she agrees. However, the rebels get wind of that and want to use Amy as a double agent. Danton reveals to Amy that the letter contains important information from the Ministry of Medicine and wants Amy to infiltrate the Ministry. In order to do so, Danton should go to Fripp Square and visit Silas Harrison, a noble who has shown signs of Green Lung and who will be visited by a doctor.

Amy manages to find Harrison’s manor and breaks in. She steals an appointment card that was meant for Harrison. With the card, she is able to enter the Ministry. In a disguise Amy visits the doctor and gets a dose of the vaccine. Afterwards, she breaks into the storage room and finds it full of vaccine; enough to treat the whole population for years. Amy realizes that the government has been lying all along. However, she is arrested and put into prison where she is supposed to stay until she will be executed. Tiberius visits her and reveals that he had put a listening device on her and telling her she failed the loyalty test. He also wants to eliminate Danton and the rest of the rebels. However, Amy manages to escape with the help of a red-eyed raven. When she arrives at the rebel’s hideout, everyone is dead. She finds a hidden message and learns that Danton has survived and fled to the reactor base. Before Amy goes there, she gives her lottery ticket to a friend, because she already had a dose of the vaccine and therefore does not need it anymore. Through a public announcement she hears that her ticket won and Amy believes it's a coincidence. However, when she gets to Danton she is told that the lottery is just a farce and that they can track the person with each number; they are using her friend as a bait to get Amy.

She goes to Willowdale Plaza and finds her friend who is being tortured by two guards. Amy cannot save her friend and tries to flee. She is attacked by a guard, but manages to kill him. However, she gets mortally wounded and almost bleeds to death. She sees the Reaper and passes out. When she wakes up, she is a friend’s house and has been in a coma for three weeks. She visits Danton and learns that she is itching to launch an attack on Tiberius, but lacks the manpower. Amy joins the Acolytes of the Reaper, which is a cult who waits for the Reaper to take them. She drinks a certain potion that will give her the so-called Vision and which will let her speak to the Reaper. While being in a hallucinating state, she sees some dead people and talks to them. When she wakes up from this, she continues her search for the Reaper. Amy comes across an old train where she meets a lady who tells her about the subway. When she arrives there, Amy finds the secret hideout of the Reaper who turns out to be a doctor in disguise; the Reaper is a persona he invented to scare off others and work in peace on a permanent cure for Green Lung. The cure is almost ready to use, he just needs a human subject to test it on and the information for mass-produce. Amy also learns that the red-eyed ravens are actually mechanical and through them the doctor has helped her several times. Amy also needs to get the information for mass-producing the cure from the Ministry of Energy.

Before that, she breaks into the quarantine zone and looks for a test subject. She escapes with an old friend and takes him to the doctor. Afterwards Amy gets the Acolytes of the Reaper to help her and the rebels to serve as a distraction for Tiberius’s guards after she and the doctor convince them that the Reaper is not real. Amy also returns to the old train and learns from the lady that there is an underground entrance to the Ministry of Energy. Amy and Danton break into the Ministry and work their way up to the top of the tower. After a final confrontation with Tiberius, Amy has the option to shoot him, Danton, or both.

== Reception ==
Reception

Aggregate score
Aggregator	Score
Metacritic	PC: 75/100 iOS: 77/100

Review scores
Publication	Score
Adventure Gamers	4/5
GameSpot	6/10
PC Gamer (US)	66/100

Shardlight received "generally favorable reviews" from video game critics according to Metacritic, translating to a weighted score of 75/100 based on 26 reviews. Kyle LeClair from Hardcore Gamer gave 3 out of 5 stars, saying: "A lack of originality and some storytelling flaws hurt it a little, but the end result still has enough visual flair and enjoyable bits of narrative to easily earn a recommendation." Aaron Riccio from Slant Magazine gave 1.5 out of 5 stars and criticized the game's puzzles and pacing, saying: "Shardlight, then, is a mere fragment of the game it could've been, as there's nothing holding it together."
