= Resonance (video game) =

2012 video game

- Developer: XII Games
- Publisher: Wadjet Eye Games
- Producers: Dave Gilbert; Vince Twelve
- Programmers: Janet Gilbert; Vince Twelve
- Artist: Shane Stevens
- Writer: Vince Twelve
- Composers: Nikolas Sideris; North by Sound
- Engine: Adventure Game Studio
- Platforms: Microsoft Windows, OS X, Linux
- Release: June 19, 2012
- Genre: Graphic adventure
- Mode: Single-player

Resonance is a Graphic adventure video game developed by American studio XII Games and published by Wadjet Eye Games.

== Plot ==
Ed (voiced by Edward Bauer) is the assistant to Professor Javier Morales, a brilliant particle physicist. He encounters Anna (Sarah Elmaleh) on a train, and they become friendly. When he arrives at the laboratory, he meets Detective Bennett (Logan Cunningham), who is responding to an emergency call. Some sort of disaster has taken place; the lab has been destroyed, and Professor Morales is dead. Meanwhile, political blogger Ray (Daryl Lathon) is investigating a mysterious organisation known as Antevorta at the behest of a shadowy source, and uncovers a database of the DNA sequences of everyone in the country hidden in a hospital. While taking Morales to the hospital, Ed and Bennett encounter both Ray and Anna, who is a doctor and Morales's niece. Ed reveals that Morales was working on a technology called Resonance, which could be used as a deadly weapon in the wrong hands, and the four of them set out to discover who is responsible for Morales's death and ensure that they do not take hold of his research. That night, Anna is attacked by an intruder in her apartment and flees for her life, escaping her attacker and reuniting with Ed and Bennett.

The four of them discover that Morales had a secret vault somewhere in the city, and surmise that his research must be stored there. Bennet steals the blueprints of the laboratory from the police archives and Ray secures Morales's credit history from a contact of his. The exact details of the vault have been stolen from the security firm who designed it, but they are able to locate it regardless. The four protagonists break into the vault, which is in the tunnels below the laboratory. As they reach the vault, Bennett is held at gunpoint with Ed accusing him of being bribed by Antevorta. When Anna accesses the vault computer, she discovers that Morales was not her uncle, but her father. She has the opportunity to download or delete the Resonance research, but before she acts, Bennett suddenly realizes that Ed had been traveling far out of his way on the metro in order to be on the line Anna rode at the start of the game, and that he is the Antevorta plant. Ed shoots Anna, steals the Resonance devices, and flees.

Upon leaving the vault, Bennett and Ray discover that they have been blamed for both Anna and Morales's murders, and are now wanted men. They are summoned to a meeting with the man who stole the vault plans, who is also Ray's source, and who works for Antevorta. From there they are able to track Ed down to the hospital, where he is attempting to destroy the Antevorta database. He has placed the Resonance devices, taken from the vault, in the basement and on the roof so that the database lies between them. After finding and taking the one in the basement, Ray and Bennett see a television broadcast revealing a series of terrible Resonance attacks is occurring all over the world. They rush to the rooftop to confront Ed, who holds them at gunpoint and sets the timer to fire the Resonance devices in a few minutes. He reveals that he was once the pawn of Antevorta, who compelled him to become close to Anna under false pretenses and aid them in stealing Resonance. He explains that Antevorta is responsible for the global attacks, intending them as a false flag with the aim of securing political power. From here, there are two possible endings:

Anna, Ed, Bennett and Ray.

- Ending 1: Ray positions himself so that when the Resonance devices fire, Ed is unknowingly standing directly in between them, and is vaporized. They are unable to prevent the President from enacting legislation giving Antevorta sweeping political power. Later, Ray has written a news article revealing the truth behind what has happened, but he and Bennett have been offered a full pardon in exchange for their silence. The game ends with the player deciding whether or not to publish the article.
- Ending 2: Ray agrees with Ed that Antevorta must be stopped, and shows him the device Ed presumed to be in the basement. Ed subsequently halts the timer. Bennett protests, refusing to aid a murderer, and Ed shoots and kills him in response. Ed and Ray exit the rooftop, and the scene fades to black. The resonance explosion is then shown, vaporizing a crater in the side of the hospital (presumably where Antevorta is located). Later, Ray has written a news article revealing the truth behind what has happened, but Ed urges him not to publish it, as world powers have united against the attacks, and he fears their knowing the truth will ruin the peace. Despite his protestations, Ray publishes the article.
- Finale: The aftermath of the player's choices plays out in the form of newspaper headlines behind the closing credits.

== Gameplay ==
The game's graphics have what IGN called a "retro, low-res pixel art aesthetic". After a series of brief vignettes in which the player controls one character at a time, they are able to switch between any of the four characters at will, using the menu at the top of the screen. They are controlled through a simplified point-and-click interface, in the style of traditional adventure games from LucasArts and Sierra Entertainment. Many puzzles require multiple characters in order to solve them, such as one in which Ed must crawl into a ventilation shaft while Bennett controls the flow of water through a series of pipes. All four protagonists have areas only they can access or characters who only they can speak to, though most actions can be performed by any of them. All four will offer slightly different descriptions of objects or characters when looking at them.

In addition to a traditional inventory, the player is able to drag objects from the gameworld into a menu which represents the character's memory, which allows them to ask about the object in question when talking to NPCs or one another. The game also consists of several puzzles which the player must solve, including a block-moving puzzle box and a hallucinatory maze.

Resonance features a creator's commentary mode. When this is active, hotspots are inserted into the gameworld which, when clicked, will trigger an audio commentary from either Vince Twelve or Dave and Janet Gilbert, describing various elements of the background and making of the game.

== Development ==
Vince Twelve worked on the game in his spare time for five years, writing, designing, programming, and creating the special effects for the game. Towards the end of that period the game was taken on by Wadjet Eye Games, with Dave Gilbert taking on the role of executive producer and voice director, and Janet Gilbert the role of full-time programmer, the only person to work full-time on the project at any point. Vince Twelve continued on as project manager and writer. Working together, they were able to complete and publish the game. The game was on Kickstarter in late 2009.

== Reception ==
Reception

Aggregate score
Aggregator	Score
Metacritic	76/100

Review scores
Publication	Score
Adventure Gamers	4.5/5
Destructoid	9/10
Game Informer	8/10
GameSpot	5/10
GameSpy	4.5/5
IGN	7/10
Jeuxvideo.com	16/20
PC PowerPlay	8/10
VideoGamer.com	6/10
The Digital Fix	8/10

Resonance received "generally favorable reviews" according to the review aggregation website Metacritic. Reviewing it for Kotaku, Kate Cox said, "Resonance is the best classic-style adventure game I've played in ages. Go get it now," and a Destructoid review called it "a fresh, modern mystery (which has) set the bar rather high for other adventure game developers, and not just indies...it might have been over all too quickly, but it was undoubtedly worth the five year wait." The GameSpot review was more critical, stating that the "script relies on cliches to fill in for real characterization and personal development (and) the dialogue is also weak, both in and of itself and with regard to how it fits in with Resonance's scenes."

Resonance was awarded several AGS Awards, it was awarded Best Gameplay, Best Independent Adventure, and Best Traditional Adventure as selected by both the staff and readers of the site.

Resonance was also named the best indie adventure game of 2012 by Indie Games Plus. The site also listed Resonance at #9 among the top 12 indie games of 2012.
