= Da New Guys: Day of the Jackass =

2012 video game

- Developer: ICEBOX Studios
- Publisher: Wadjet Eye Games
- Designer: Chris Burton
- Engine: Adventure Game Studio
- Platform: Windows
- Release: 29 February 2012
- Genre: Point-and-click adventure

Da New Guys: Day of the Jackass is a point-and-click adventure video game created by ICEBOX Studios and published by Wadjet Eye Games in 2012. It is about a trio of members on a wrestling team called "Da New Guys" who try to save one of their members after he is kidnapped.

== Reception ==
Reception

Aggregate score
Aggregator	Score
Metacritic	56/100

Review scores
Publication	Score
Adventure Gamers	3/5 stars
Destructoid	65/100
GameSpot	7/10
PC PowerPlay	5/10

Da New Guys: Day of the Jackass received a score of 56/100 on review aggregator Metacritic, indicating mixed or average reviews by critics.

Gamespot wrote that "the game looks, sounds, and plays like a lost classic from the golden age of adventure games circa 1992, complete with a cute premise, a cast of likable lunks, and some of the flaws that annoyed even adventure diehards way back when."
