= Emerald City Confidential =

2009 video game

- Developer: Wadjet Eye Games
- Publisher: PlayFirst
- Designer: Dave Gilbert
- Engine: Playground SDK
- Platforms: Windows, Macintosh
- Release: February 19, 2009
- Genre: Adventure
- Mode: Single-player

Emerald City Confidential is a 2009 computer adventure game conceived by Dave Gilbert, developed by Wadjet Eye Games, and published through PlayFirst.

== Gameplay ==
Emerald City Confidential is a third-person, mouse-driven adventure game in which the player must solve various puzzles and follow certain procedures in order for the linear storyline to proceed. As a pure graphical adventure game, Emerald City Confidential follows the guidelines first introduced by LucasArts: it is impossible to die or to get stuck at any moment in the game, which allows the user to become fully immersed in Emerald City Confidential's universe without the fear of making a mistake or the constant need to save the game. With this in mind, there are no save game functions, but the player's position is automatically bookmarked and restored when the game is restarted.

== Plot ==
In her Emerald City office, Petra accepts Dee's case.

The game is set in the magical land of Oz, created by L. Frank Baum, as put through the gritty filter of 1940s film noir, with harsh city streets, grey rainy skies, femmes fatales, tough guys, trenchcoats, fedoras and plot twists. It is Oz, seen through the eyes of Raymond Chandler.

The game follows the protagonist Petra, Emerald City's only private eye, as she is approached by a strange woman named Dee Gale. Dee's fiancé is missing, and she is willing to pay Petra above the going rate in order to find him. Lacking any other prospects, Petra agrees. What starts off as a simple missing person case soon takes Petra deep into the seedy underbelly of the Emerald City's criminal underground and beyond. She encounters many characters from the Oz canon and some new characters, learns several magic spells, and uncovers the answer to a dark secret that has haunted Petra all her life.

=== List of characters in chronological order ===
- Petra – The protagonist of the story. She quit her job as a Palace Guard during a time of war to look for her missing little brother, William, when no one else would help and became a detective in the hope of finding a lead to discover the child's fate.
- Lion – The Lion is portrayed as a corrupt lawyer who frequently slips through Petra's grasp.
- The Gump – Unlike the original stories, Gumps are shown in this game as a kind of taxi service throughout Oz. One of them talks, rescues Petra, and goes by the name of Fluffy.
- Dee – Dorothy Gale in this game is now forty years older and prefers to be called Dee. She hires Petra to find her missing fiancé, Anzel, sending her on a case that quickly evolves into something much darker than Petra thought possible.
- Tik-Tok – A member of the Royal Guard of Oz. He assists Petra only when it does not contradict the orders given to him.
- Hank the Mule – Hank guards the entrance to Betsy Bobbins' mansion on Grinetta Lane in Emerald City. He is incredibly loyal to his mistress, but confides in Petra that although Betsy has many boyfriends, she really just wants the gifts they send her.
- Scraps, the Patchwork Girl – Scraps runs a shop next door to Petra's office. She does dealings with both the Lion and the Frogman and it is later revealed that she is involved in the buying and selling of black market goods. She frequently thinks that she may be using the wrong words even when she isn't.
- Betsy Bobbins – Anzel's former mistress and Hank's boss. She confides in Petra that she had a lot of respect for Anzel until he ran out of money. She tells her that he works for the Royal Oz University.
- General Jinjur – Jinjur is the commanding officer of the Royal Guard of Oz. She despises Petra and the feeling is mutual. She appears to be stone-hearted and callous, often accusing people of using magic without a license. She dislikes Petra because Petra abandoned her post at Royal Guard when they needed all the help they could get during the war.
- Captain Bill – A simple, honest captain whose ship blew up and sunk. Believing it was done by unstable magic, Jinjur threatens to lock him up. Bill later admits that he does work for Jack Pumpkinhead to work off a debt involving a magic amulet that helped improve Trot's health when she was sick.
- Trot – A girl who works for Captain Bill. She asks Petra to find out who really blew up the ship to get Jinjur off their backs.
- Jack Pumpkinhead – In this adaptation of the Oz stories, Jack Pumpkinhead is the leader of a smuggling ring. Petra has tried to have Jack put away for smuggling, but he knows how to pulls off a good lie. It is later revealed that Captain Bill smuggles pumpkins filled with magical artifacts all over Oz for Jack.
- Professor Wogglebug – The Wogglebug is a professor at Oz University. There are a few aspects of the university he doesn't like, such as field trips, but he admits that they are valuable. He is the inventor of a "Knowledge Pharmacy" which is a machine that compacts knowledge into pill form.
- Cutter – An assistant at the university. It is later revealed that Cutter is actually Petra's little brother, William, who has been missing since he was a child. She quit the Royal Guard to become a detective to search for him when no one would help. He has lived his life as an enemy spy who was brainwashed by the Phanfasms to believe he was one of them. Later, when the truth is made known to him, he redeems himself by helping Petra beat the enemy.
- Ruggedo – Stripped of his powers, the former Nome King is now the owner of Ruggedo's Bar. It is revealed by the Scarecrow that Ruggedo is hiding Anzel from some enemies.
- Toto – Dorothy Gale's pet dog. Unlike in the books, while he's in Oz he has the power of speech. He can also smell if something has been touched by magic. He offers to do so for Petra in exchange of a pill from the Knowledge Pharmacy.
- Scarecrow – Petra is given a lead to the Scarecrow by Jack Pumpkinhead. The Scarecrow first appears as merely an odd-looking man leaning against Petra's office building and does not reveal his true identity until Petra finds out. He used to be the ruler of Oz, but he has abdicated his throne to Queen Ozma.
- Queen Ozma – The Queen of Oz. She has outlawed magic within Emerald City limits for anyone without a license.
- Nick Chopper – The Tin Man is now the governor of Winkie Country. Depressed and reliant on oil to get himself through each day, Nick is unable to prevent the Frogman from conducting his shady dealings and extorting the local business owners.
- The Sawhorse – Nick Chopper's horse. He attended Anzel's expedition party, but something happened that frightened him so that he won't even talk about it. He later helps Petra get around Winkie Country. He defeats the Frogman by kicking him off the Winkie ravine.
- Frogman – This portrayal of the Frogman is that of a mobster who controls many illicit operations in Winkie Country. Later, he meets his fate when he gets kicked off the Winkie ravine by the Sawhorse.
- Shaggy – Shaggy runs a Gump Garage in Flow. Like Miss Cayke, he is being extorted for money by the Frogman. Shaggy speaks slowly and quite often stumbles over his words. He secretly has a crush on Miss Cayke and becomes much more articulate whenever he talks about her.
- Miss Cayke – Miss Cayke owns a diner just across the street from Shaggy's garage. Like Shaggy, she is being extorted for money by the Frogman. She is in quite a predicament as she wants to financially aide her family in Munchkin country, but the Frogman wants too much of her earnings to do so.
- Nimee Amee – She is the Frogman's personal assistant and Nick Chopper's ex-girlfriend. She wishes to patch things up, but the Tin Man holds nothing but disdain for her.
- Wicked Witch of the West – Part of Petra's missions is to resurrect the Wicked Witch so she can help restore the magical balance and protect Oz from an incoming army. The Sawhorse is afraid of her. There's no need for her to cause a ruckus as the rightful queen now wears the crown and not a wizard usurper.
- Woot the Wanderer – Woot is the owner of a magical fighting arena called Woot's Wild Arena of the Arcane. He runs a strict business to avoid getting in trouble with the law.
- Mombi – Mombi is Woot's star fighter and reigning champion at his arena. She is highly conceited and vain. She is also too stubborn to admit defeat.
- Wizard of Oz – Now stripped of his throne, the Wizard coaches at Woot's arena. He agrees to coach Petra against Mombi if she takes him up Glinda's tower. Glinda calls him 'Pinhead', a reference to his initials which spell out O.Z.P.I.N.H.E.A.D.
- Ugu – The Wizard's doltish pupil before Petra asks the Wizard to be her coach.
- Kiki Aru – A false magician who imprisoned a magic rope to do his bidding.
- Glinda – To complete the balance, Petra must also resurrect Glinda who then reunites with the Wizard to help defeat the invading army.
- The First and Foremost – Evil ruler of the Oz's enemy, the Phanfasms. He takes William from Oz in exchange for ending the war and raises him as a Phanfasm. Petra kills him by trapping him in a picture of himself and burning it up.

== Development ==
The game was developed using Playfirst's Playground SDK. Background art was done by John Green, the artist and co-creator (with Dave Roman) of the graphic novels Teen Boat! and Jax Epoch and the Quicken Forbidden.

== Response ==
Most reviews of the game have been positive, with particular praise for the story even where the rest of the review has been less glowing. It has also topped PlayFirst's own chart for weeks after its release. Game Tunnel reviewed the game as "Buy" and awarded it a Gold Award, rating it #2 of February 2009 indie game releases.
