= Primordia (video game) =

2012 video game

- Developer: Wormwood Studios
- Publisher: Wadjet Eye Games
- Designer: Mark Yohalem
- Programmer: James Spanos
- Artist: Victor Pflug
- Writer: Mark Yohalem
- Composer: Nathaniel Chambers
- Engine: Adventure Game Studio
- Platforms: Microsoft Windows, OS X, Linux, iOS, Nintendo Switch
- Release: Microsoft Windows, OS X, Linux: WW: December 5, 2012; iOS: WW: September 21, 2016; Nintendo Switch: WW: March 2, 2022
- Genre: Adventure
- Mode: Single-player

Primordia is a cyberpunk point-and-click adventure game developed by Wormwood Studios and published in 2012 by Wadjet Eye Games. In 2016, Primordia was released on iOS devices. On March 2, 2022, the game was released on Nintendo Switch.

== Plot ==
In a post-apocalyptic world, android Horatio Nullbuilt (Logan Cunningham) and his floating robot companion Crispin (Abe Goldfarb) inhabit and attempt to rebuild U.N.N.I.I.C, a derelict airship stranded in a vast desert. One night, a heavy, floating, square-like robot invades the airship, incapacitates Horatio with its laser and steals the airship's power core. Crispin suggests they head to the legendary city of Metropol, a "city of glass and eternal light", for a new core, but Horatio remains adamant in either reclaiming the stolen core or finding a new one in the wasteland, totally preferring to stay away from Metropol due to his pre-programmed hatred of the city, that he can't discern the reason for.

Navigating the wasteland close to U.N.N.I.I.C, Horatio and Crispin come across and reactivate a buried, gigantic robotic war machine named Goliath, who claims that Horatio's true name is Horus, an ancient enemy of theirs, and thus won't surrender their power core. They also come across and pass through the tests of faith of a sentry drone Ever-Faithful Leobuilt, who tests Horatio's knowledge of the 'Gospel of Man' (a robotic interpretation of the Holy Bible where instead of a metaphysical God, the human race, ‘Man’, are the creator gods of robots). Ever-Faithful allows him to take a bomblet from the bomb that the drone revered as a shrine. Horatio and Crispin attempt to use the bomblet's energy core to power U.N.N.I.I.C back up, but this proves fruitless.

Attempting to chase the robot thief, Horatio and Crispin are ultimately led to Metropol, revealed as a dilapidated metropolis filled with robots governed with an iron hand by MetroMind, the city's AI previously in charge of subways and transit. At entry, Horatio is stripped of a megacycle (CPU power cycle) and the 'Gospel of Man', deemed a subversive literature that is tossed into the city's underground, the Underworks. Meeting some of Metropol's citizenry, Horatio learns the power core thief is MetroMind's right hand henchman called S.C.R.A.P.E.R (Subway Construction, Repair and Precision Excavation Robot), and the power core is in her possession in MetroTower, a giant power station.

Horatio attempts to reclaim the power core legally by reopening Metropol's courtroom with the aid of Clarity Arbiterbuilt, the aid to Metropol's Arbiter (the city's judicial AI), but Horatio discovers the Arbiter itself had its memory banks wiped. In the back of the courthouse, Horatio finds the corpse of Clarity's sister and fellow legal aid, Charity, and obtains her final memories. Shortly after, S.C.R.A.P.E.R. tries capturing Horatio and Crispin, but Horatio collapses the courtroom entrance atop S.C.R.A.P.E.R. Charity's memories reveal evidence that MetroMind used her to be rid of Arbiter – under the pretense of "preventing a civil war" – and take over Metropol through a silent coup. Witnessing this, Clarity determines MetroMind has lost all legal protection and joins Horatio and Crispin's quest for the power core. She informs Horatio that in order to confront MetroMind, they must acquire fragments of the access code to MetroTower, which was exclusive to the ruling AIs.

Uncovering and accessing a digital ghost of Memorious (the city's historical archives AI), Horatio discovers that MetroMind had erased all data regarding the human race that once lived in Metropol and formed a division of the city's Council of Robots, with her and Factor (the city's fabrication AI) on one side and Arbiter and Steeple (Metropol's religious leader) on the other. Memorious took sides with MetroMind with the removal of Steeple for calculating the data regarding humans felt irrelevant to city administration. The trio also learns that humanity extinguished themselves in chemical warfare between its four remaining cities (Municipa, Civitas, Urbani and Metropol), leaving only machines behind. In the Underworks, the trio reactivates Factor, disabled on MetroMind's orders, and Horatio recovers the Gospel of Man confiscated from him.

After reconstructing the access code sequence, the trio head to MetroTower to confront MetroMind on her crimes, and MetroMind declares her commitment to 'progress'. S.C.R.A.P.E.R, who survived the collapse of the courtroom, arrives at the Council chambers, and Clarity sacrifices herself to save both Horatio and Crispin, telling both to head towards 'Calliope Station', originally meant to be a separate subway station but revealed to be a secret room within the station platform from where Horatio and Crispin first arrived. They discover MetroMind's mainframe within. As Horatio attempts destroying it, MetroMind tries stripping him of his remaining megacycles, forcing Crispin to detonate himself to destroy her mainframe.

Upon reactivating, Horatio recovers a data chip from MetroMind's mainframe and discovers his true identity as the AI of HORUS, an Urbanian war machine unleashed to destroy Metropol. HORUS - revealed as the U.N.N.I.I.C (the bottom half of HORUS's name had worn away) - was heavily damaged by Metropol's guardian, Goliath, forcing it to infect Goliath with a virus, Thanatos, neutralizing the war machine. However, as HORUS attempted to destroy all human life in Metropol, its last name "Manbuilt" made him realize he was targeting his own creators. HORUS, becoming aware, detached a partial servitor from itself, which would later become Horatio over the years, and self-destructed itself to save the remaining humans. Horatio also discovers he carried the Thanatos virus with him all along.

Horatio returns to MetroTower to recover the power core, but confronts MetroMind's new version - Crispin's sacrifice only destroyed a former version of her. She admits to having extinguished the remaining humans herself, claiming they were nothing but 'destroyers', unworthy of worship. She also admits to having stolen the power core to solve Metropol's ever-growing needs for energy. MetroMind offers Horatio a “choice” between merging with her or being killed by S.C.R.A.P.E.R., as she covets Horatio's craftsmanship abilities, believing it is her key to 'saving' Metropol, which is now nothing but an extension of MetroMind herself.

The player can react in seven different ways to this:

1. Horatio merges willingly with MetroMind and both continue working on towards 'Progress'.

2. Horatio refuses to merge and is destroyed by S.C.R.A.P.E.R. MetroMind continues her mission of 'Progress' unabated.

3. Horatio climbs the roof of MetroTower and commits suicide by falling. Regardless, MetroMind continues her mission of 'Progress'.

4. Horatio destroys the power core, exploding MetroTower and causing an irreversible blackout across Metropol, with all robots inevitably scattering and dying from lack of power.

5. Horatio spreads the Thanatos virus to MetroMind's broadcast system, throwing Metropol into irreversible chaos, but avenging the extinct humankind.

6. Horatio keeps the power core at gunpoint with his plasma torch and MetroMind is forced to open passage to Horatio to take the power core back to the U.N.N.I.I.C.

7. Horatio uses the Thanatos virus on S.C.R.A.P.E.R. and scares MetroMind away.

If the player chose either of the last two endings, Horatio takes the power core and rebuilds HORUS to fly away from Metropol forever, taking the city's robots he knew with him. Note that Crispin and Clarity can be present in this ending if Horatio (the player) recovered the items needed to rebuild them (Clarity's head and Crispin's core matrix), with different dialogue for each possible combination. However, if neither party member is present, Horatio instead gives in to despair and wipes his memory like his previous versions did; there is no ship repair scene or other robots in this ending.

== Gameplay ==
Unlike in many adventure games, Primordia's puzzles are generally grounded in real-world logic and offer multiple solutions, a direct reflection of the game's writer and designer, Mark Yohalem's Harvard Law education and career as lawyer. How the player solves the puzzles—and what choices the player makes—determines which of the game's many endings takes place.

Primordia has a typical point-and-click interface: a left mouse click to interact with objects, a right click to examine them. Every function needed is always available from a drop-down control panel that appears when you move the pointer to the top of the screen. Inventory items can be combined in the inventory user interface and may be used on every hot-spot and character. Crispin can be told to interact with objects, too. Crispin also serves as a hint-system blended-in appropriately with the game in order to avoid breaking the fourth wall. As Horatio and Crispin wander about, a datapad automatically stores codes, passwords and information about the world. The datapad also contains a map which allows fast travel (whenever that's available) with one click to every known location. Conversations with other robots are handled in a multiple choice fashion. There is both a manual and an automatic save system to make sure your progress is saved.

== Critical reception ==
Reception

Aggregate score
Aggregator	Score
Metacritic	PC: 72/100 iOS: 81/100

Review score
Publication	Score
TouchArcade	iOS: 4.5/5

Primordia received positive reviews from independent and genre websites, and mixed reviews from larger sites. Adventure Gamers described Primordia as "a gorgeous, clever, and melancholy science-fiction parable" with "beautiful, surrealistic retro graphics [that] drip with atmosphere." The site also awarded it Setting of the Year for its "haunted world, one that oozes history far more detailed than the events laid out by the game's exposition, and one that stuck with us long after we left it behind."

Hardcore Gaming 101 praised Primordia as "the first graphic adventure game of recent memory to be truly worthy of being compared to the triumphs of the glory days", and PopMatters called it "an evolution of the genre . . . leaps and bounds more interesting because its ideas are more complex and intricate." Other sites praised its story as one of the best science fiction stories in any medium for years.

By contrast, larger sites such as IGN and GameSpy complained that the puzzles were too numerous and too difficult, that the game's low resolution did a disservice to its graphics, and that the game's humor could be jarring.

On Metacritic, it holds a score of 72/100.

An iOS port of Primordia was released on September 21, 2016. This version modified the controls to accommodate a touch-screen interface and changed the font to be more readable on a smaller screen. Its reviews from larger sites have been positive, and its Metacritic score is 81/100. TouchArcade rated the game 4.5/5, describing it as "brilliant": "The writing is stellar, the voice acting is ace, the style is top notch, and the soundtrack perfectly sets the tone." 148Apps rated it 4/5, praising its "great art, clever puzzles, and fantastic world building."

== "Fallen" ==
In June 2013, Wormwood Studios released "Fallen", a spoiler-free spin-off novella set after the game's ending, which was praised for its writing and art. "Fallen" is available for free as a PDF, ePUB, or animated audiobook. It has been translated into German, Italian, and Spanish.
