= Gemini Rue =

2011 video game

- Developer: Joshua Nuernberger
- Publisher: Wadjet Eye Games
- Composer: Nathan Allen Pinard
- Engine: Adventure Game Studio
- Platforms: Microsoft Windows, Mac OS, iOS, Android, Linux
- Release: Microsoft Windows: WW: February 24, 2011; iOS: WW: April 11, 2013; Android: WW: December 17, 2013
- Genre: Graphic adventure
- Mode: Single-player

Gemini Rue is a cyberpunk graphic adventure game made by Joshua Nuernberger, and published by Wadjet Eye Games. The game uses a point-and-click interface to interact with the environment to solve puzzles and communicate with characters. A port for iOS devices was released on April 11, 2013.

== Gameplay ==
Gemini Rue is a graphic adventure game. The player alternates control between two characters, Azriel and Delta-Six, at different intervals throughout the story. Later in the game they also control an additional character named Sayuri. Gameplay consists of exploration of the local environment, interactions with characters, and puzzle solving. The game also contains a minor gunplay mechanic. The player is equipped with a communicator device to call other characters and look up information via a limited text interface. At certain times, the player is able to switch between two characters located in different areas of the game's world; proceeding through each of these stories separately until reaching a common story.

== Plot ==
Gemini Rue takes place in the 23rd century within the "Gemini System", a star system recently declared independent from the Taurus and Pleaidas System through the war ten years prior to the beginning of the game. Though peace has come, the war left a power void, and the mafia-like Boryokudan crime syndicate controls much of the system, using its control of a drug called "Juice".

The game initially follows two characters. One is Azriel Odin, an assassin now turned to a law enforcer who is seeking to get any information about his brother Daniel. While searching the planet of Barracus, Azriel is aided by his friend and pilot Kane Harris, who maintains their spacecraft in orbit. Azriel comes to aid Matthius Howard, a friend of Azriel's from the previous war who is wanted by the Boryokudan and who claims to have information on Daniel's location. His information is tentative, pointing to a secret facility, Center 7, in a nearby nebula where Daniel may have been taken. Azriel convinces the Boryokudan to give him the location of Center 7 in exchange for Azriel retrieving a missing Juice supply to the Boryokudan, which is eventually revealed to have been stolen by a woman named Sayuri, who reveals she had escaped from Center 7 one year previously. Azriel eventually gets the location of Center 7 while still destroying the Juice supply, and leaves Barracus for Center 7 along with Kane, Matthius, and Sayuri, who claims to have "left someone behind" on Center 7.

The other character is Delta-Six, who later takes the name "Charlie". When Delta-Six first awakes he finds himself in a "rehabilitation center" for "criminals", lacking any memories of his past, but promised by the center's "director" that by completing tests involving gun training he will be allowed to go free. As he meets other patients, it is clear that he previously had tried to escape the facility but had his mind wiped after he was captured. Giselle, one of the patients that had tried to help him escape before, directs him to keep up the escape plan and not to complete the final test as he would be sent to have his mind wiped again. Charlie is nearly killed by another patient, Balder, who is angered by his attempts to escape, but Charlie breaks free and burns off most of Balder's face in his escape. He attempts escape along with Giselle and Epsilon-Five, another prisoner, who does not choose a name for herself (the name "Sayuri" is suggested by Giselle). Giselle is killed and Charlie wounded and recaptured by an angry Balder (with his face having undergone surgery). Epsilon-Five escapes.

Kane's ship arrives at Center 7, and Azriel and Sayuri set off to locate where Daniel may be held. The computers give no information on Daniel's location, prompting them to continue to the director's office where more complete records would be found. They suddenly find themselves trapped in a room slowly filling with a sleep gas, where the director watches from an adjoining room. The director explains that Azriel is really Charlie – after Charlie's failed escape a year ago, he was wiped of his memory again, and this time given the identity of an assassin Azriel, which they had trained him for before. However, Azriel left his assassin's life due to "a part of the psyche the rehabilitation cannot change - the conscience." After Azriel left the Boryokudan, the director triggered the memory of Daniel as a means of recalling Azriel back to Center 7, where he now plans to re-wipe his memory and create a new identity for him. Matthius is revealed to have been Balder, and was to help seed the idea of Azriel's brother. Sayuri is Epsilon-Five.

With Azriel taken to be mind-wiped, Sayuri and Kane are captured, but they manage to escape. They free Azriel before the full memory wipe can be completed, and set the station to self-destruct. However, both Azriel and Sayuri desire to get their original memories back which would have been stored on the director's computer. They race there, with Azriel killing Matthius en route, and run into a standoff with the director, who explains that the station's purpose is to create these assassins and other mercenaries for the Boryokudan from innocent people, and asserts that the human condition is nothing but their memories. The director shoots Sayuri, and Azriel shoots and kills the director. Azriel moves towards the director's databases, but Sayuri says she does not want to know her past. The two escape with Kane just as the station explodes, the other patients safely making it off in a second craft. As Kane takes them out of the nebula, Sayuri contemplates that there is more to being a human being than a person's memories.

== Reception ==
Reception

Aggregate score
Aggregator	Score
Metacritic	PC: 82/100 iOS: 86/100

Review scores
Publication	Score
Eurogamer	8/10
GamePro	4/5
GameSpot	7/10
GameSpy	4/5
GameTrailers	n/a
IGN	9/10
PC Gamer (US)	81%

The game was very well received by game critics, with praise singled out for its compelling storyline and retro graphics. It is considered an impressive example of the point-and-click adventure game genre which has experienced a recent renaissance after being in a decline for around a decade. The sequences involving combat, however, were criticized for their stiff controls and an action-oriented tone inconsistent with the rest of the game. On Metacritic, it has a normalized rating of 82 out of 100, which indicates "generally favorable reviews".

IGN wrote "If only more triple-A games turned out this well. With (for the most part) seamless, intuitive gameplay, impressive atmosphere and one of most well-crafted and interesting storylines seen in recent years, Gemini Rue is a game not just for adventure fans, but for anyone who loves a good, gritty yarn." The A.V. Club said "Developer Joshua Nuernberger has crafted a smart, thoughtful tale that keeps introducing fascinating new ideas and characters. Even for such a throwback game, the execution is terrific, with great voice acting and smart-looking cutscenes." PC Gamer wrote "An exciting, surprising and thought-provoking adventure rendered in a beautiful art style. Gemini Rue earns respect." GameSpy praised the game for its "Compelling story and setting; clever, well-thought-through puzzles; great music and art." Wired said "Gemini Rue stands out among the throng of generic point-and-click adventure games. The atmosphere remains tense and dark throughout the entire game, and when you finally plow through the story’s last couple of twists, you’ll be glad you played the whole thing."

In 2011, Adventure Gamers named Gemini Rue the 79th-best adventure game ever released.

=== Awards ===
The game received the following awards:

- Gamespy's Adventure Game Of The Year 2011
- AGS Awards for Best Story & Best Independent Adventure Game of the Year
- PC Gamer US' Adventure Game of the Year 2011
