= Cyberpirates! =

Science fantasy RPG sourcebook published in 1997

Cyberpirates
- Cover art by Paul Bonner
- Designers: Chris Hepler; Jennifer Brandes; Michael Mulvihill; Jonathan Szeto
- Illustrators: Thomas M. Baxa; Peter Bergting; Kent Burles; Jason Felix; Fred Hooper; Scott James; Jeff Laubenstein; Larry MacDougall; Mark A. Nelson; Allen Nunis
- Publishers: FASA
- Publication: 1997
- Genres: Cyberpunk fantasy

Cyberpirates! is a supplement published by FASA in 1997 for the near future science fantasy role-playing game Shadowrun that covers modern-day pirate-themed material.

== Contents ==
Shadowrun is usually set in an urban environment. Cyberpirates! adds details of three new locations: the Caribbean (including Jamaica, Haiti, the Bahamas, Cuba, and the Bermuda Triangle), the Philippines, and the Gold and Ivory Coasts of Africa. In addition, the motivations of a modern-day pirate are explained.

The second part of the book covers rule extensions necessary for running adventures above, on, or below water. Skills such as swimming and diving, underwater perception, and the use of magic are discussed in this section. Rules for ship design are also included, but another supplement titled Rigger 2 is required to take full advantage of these rules.

== Publication history ==
Shadowrun was published by FASA in 1989, and was followed by many adventures and supplements, including Cyberpirates, a 184-page softcover book with an 8-page color insert published by FASA in 1997. It was written by Chris Hepler and Jennifer Brandes with contributions from Michael A. Mulvihill and Jon Szeto, cover art by Paul Bonner, and interior art by Thomas M. Baxa, Peter Bergting, Kent Burles, Jason Felix, Fred Hooper, Scott James, Jeff Laubenstein, Larry MacDougall, Mark A. Nelson, and Allen Nunis.

== Reception ==
In Issue 112 of the French games magazine Casus Belli, Leonidas Vesperini suggested this supplement could be used simply to provide an occasional different setting to the usual urban Shadowrun campaign, or to set up a complete campaign in one of the three areas detailed in this book, with all player characters becoming pirates. However, Vesperini suggested the latter course might have problems, since "this comes at the expense of one of Shadowrun's strengths: the ease of bringing together players from all backgrounds and integrating them into any scenario." Vesperini concluded, "The stated goal of Cyberpirates was to offer an alternative to traditional Shadowrun games. It's safe to say that this rich, original, and unconventional supplement has achieved its objective. But who knows if GMs and players will want to invest more time in it than in a simple Caribbean campaign... which isn't so bad already!"

The German games magazine Envoyer noted, "This book brings a fresh perspective to everyday Runner life. It's suitable for game masters who want to offer their players something special, perhaps because there are too many well-trodden paths on land. Many new ideas can certainly be drawn from this book, and even if you don't force your group to live at sea, it's undoubtedly exciting to shift parts of the action to the water."

In Issue 7 of the French games magazine Backstab, Croc commented, "Frankly, it would never have occurred to me to design a campaign (or even a scenario) in such a setting, but the whole thing works wonderfully well, and the authors are clearly inspired." Although Croc regretted the necessity of needing the Rigger 2 supplement to take full advantage of the new rules, he concluded by giving it a rating of 7 out of 10, saying, "This supplement is not essential, but it is well-written enough to make you want to take to the skies and explore the hostile seas in search of pirates to eliminate or ships to plunder. It's a safe bet that your usual characters will have to be set aside for a few adventures to assemble a team better equipped to survive the perils of this new universe."

Cyberpirates! was reviewed in the online second version of Pyramid which said "As with the Underworld Sourcebook, this excellent title gives a whole new direction for Shadowrun campaigns."

== Other reviews and commentary ==
- Envoyer (German) (Issue 16 - Feb 1998)
