= The Blackwell Legacy =

2006 video game

- Developer: Wadjet Eye Games
- Publisher: Wadjet Eye Games
- Designer: Dave Gilbert
- Composer: Peter Gresser
- Series: Blackwell
- Engine: Adventure Game Studio
- Platforms: Microsoft Windows; iOS; Android; Linux; macOS
- Release: Microsoft Windows; December 23, 2006; iOS; July 10, 2014; Linux, macOS, Android; September 23, 2014
- Genre: Adventure game
- Mode: Single-player

The Blackwell Legacy is a 2006 graphic adventure video game, developed by Wadjet Eye Games, and released on Microsoft Windows, Linux, macOS, iOS and Android. The game involves players assuming the role of a young freelance writer living a solitary life in New York City, until she encounters a male ghost who reveals she belongs to a family of mediums, a life she is forced to adjust to as she discovers a spate of recent deaths were not natural.

The game was originally a project designed as freeware before being made into a commercial video game, with it receiving positive reviews from critics. Its success led to the creation of the Blackwell series.

== Gameplay ==
The Blackwell Legacy is a point-and-click adventure, where the player can interact with objects and characters of interest by clicking on them. A left click interacts with objects and people, and directs Rosa where to go, while right clicking allows examination of items. There is an inventory that houses all of the player's items, and whatever oddities the player collects during their adventure. Rosa carries along a notepad, where she writes down any important names or keywords. While trying to figure out connections between certain people or objects, two terms can be combined. That often gives the players a clue as to what to do next. The game is designed in the way that fully voice acted dialogue and characterization play a big part in the narrative.

== Plot ==
Rosangela 'Rosa' Blackwell, an introverted book review columnist for the Village Eye newspaper, suffers from migraine headaches following the death of her late aunt, Lauren Blackwell - a woman who looked after her following the death of Rosa's parents in a car accident. After scattering her ashes off the Queensboro Bridge, Rosa receives a call from a doctor at Bellevue Hospital, where Lauren had been a patient for the past several decades, to collect some letters that had been in their possession. Through these, she learns both her aunt and grandmother, who she knew little of, lived isolated lives before slowly having mental breakdown, often interacting with a non-existing person they both called "Joey".

Later that day, Rosa is contacted by her employer, the Village Eye newspaper, to write an article about the recent suicide of a New York University student, JoAnn Sherman. After completing the work, she returns home, where her migraines become so intense that she eventually witnesses a ghostly man appear in her apartment. The apparition introduces himself as Joey Mallone, and reveals Rosa is a spirit medium - an individual who can see and speak to the ghosts of the departed; her migraines turned out to be latent medium abilities awakening. Joey reveals he is her spirit guide, as he has been for the Blackwell family, and that Rosa's task is to help ghosts who have yet to come to terms with their deaths and move on to the afterlife. Joey makes clear that while Rosa's grandmother rejected her role, Lauren quit her role after several years; both had mental breakdowns because of this.

Joey instructs Rosa to take him to Washington Square Park, where they discover the ghost of Alli Montego, another university student. Through the investigation into her death, Rosa and Joey learn that Alli was a friend of JoAnn, and believe their deaths are connected. Further detective work leads Rosa to learn that Alli, JoAnn, and a third student who they were friends with, accidentally summoned a restless ghost called the "Deacon" after playing around with a ouija board. While JoAnn and Alli committed suicide after they couldn't stop the Deacon haunting them, the third was take to Bellevue after they attempted suicide. Using what they learn on Alli, Rosa and Joey help her move onto the afterlife, who in turn requests that the pair protect the third girl whom she names Susan Lee.

Breaking into Bellevue late at night, Rosa and Joey arrive in time to intercept the "Deacon" as they appear before Susan. The pair learn the Deacon was a priest who fell from grace and became an alcoholic following his wife's death, and that he sought help from the students to save him from Hell. Joey and Rosa intervene to assist him and help him overcome a demon blocking his path to the afterlife by destroying the source of his sins, finally giving him peace. With the case finally closed, Rosa asks Joey why her aunt stopped being a medium, leading him to reveal Lauren did so after taking in her niece in the wake of her parents death. Deciding to honor Lauren and her grandmother, Rosa embraces her newfound identity as a medium.

== Development ==
The game was developed using the Adventure Game Studio engine. Due to technical issues, it remained a Windows-only title at the beginning, even though the runtime itself had been ported to Linux and Mac OS X It was later released for those platforms in 2014, as well as Android, in Humble Bundle PC & Android 11. Ian Schlaepfer was a designer of the characters art, while Chris Femo and Tom Scary created the backgrounds, which include some of the New York cityscapes, like the Bellevue Hospital, the Queensboro Bridge, and more.

The project originally began as Bestowers of Eternity, and was released as freeware in 2003. Subsequently, it was decided for the project to be extended and redone into a proper commercial product, which ultimately became The Blackwell Legacy.

== Reception ==
Reception

Review score
| Publication | Score |
|---|---|
| GameZone | 7.5/10 |

Upon its release, The Blackwell Legacy was met with "generally favourable" reviews from critics for the Microsoft Windows, with an aggregate score of 80% on Metacritic.

It was nominated for 4 AGS Awards in 2006 and won the award for Best Character Art.
