= The Phantom Fellows =

2024 video game

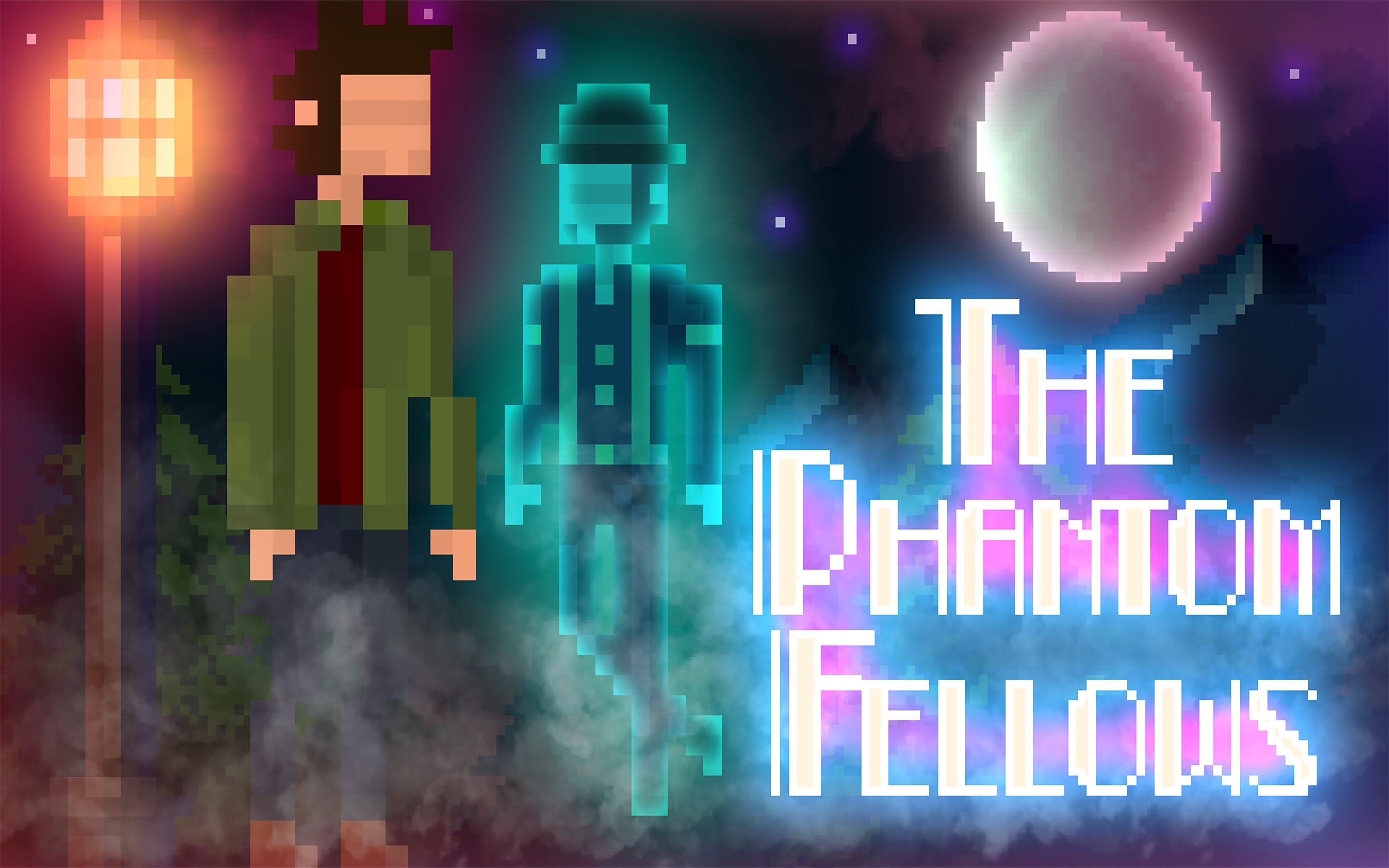
- Developer: Strummer Games
- Publisher: Strummer Games
- Platforms: Windows, macOS, Linux
- Release: September 27, 2024
- Genre: Adventure game
- Mode: Single-player

The Phantom Fellows is a 2024 indie point‑and‑click adventure game developed and published by Strummer Games, the company name of Paul Korman, who created the game’s art, music, writing, and programming. The game was released digitally for Windows, macOS, and Linux on September 27, 2024. In The Phantom Fellows, two best friends—one living and one a ghost—start a paranormal‑investigation business together, solving hauntings and helping restless spirits find peace. The game features retro pixel‑art, modern lighting effects, and a blend of comedy and heartfelt storytelling. It received positive critical attention along with several award nominations.

== Gameplay ==
The Phantom Fellows is a third‑person 2D point‑and‑click adventure. Players switch between Oliver and Englebert to solve puzzles requiring cooperation between the living and the dead. The game is divided into seven days with backtracking, an optional hint dialog with Englebert, verb icons, inventory, fast‑travel, and dual control schemes.

== Plot ==
Set in the fictional town of Elderberry, Colorado, the story follows Oliver Cobblestone, a young man who can see and communicate with a ghost named Englebert Picklebender. Together, Oliver (“breather”) and Englebert (“floater”) form The Phantom Fellows paranormal‑investigation service. Over seven in‑game days they tackle humorous supernatural cases while a darker threat gradually emerges, ultimately targeting Oliver.

== Development ==
Colorado-based developer Paul Korman created the game solo under the studio name Strummer Games, named after his son. Influenced by Sierra and LucasArts titles, he taught himself coding and pixel art over four years. The game was built in Adventure Game Studio and released on Steam, GOG.com, itch.io, Fireflower Games, and the Mac App Store. Korman composed an ambient synthwave score to complement the pixel visuals.

== Reception ==
The Phantom Fellows received positive reviews from several independent publications. Adventure Gamers awarded the game a 4.5 out of 5, describing it as "a striking, modern ghost story told with vintage charm" and praising its “striking and eerily lit pixel art.” Adventure Game Hotspot gave it a score of 85/100, highlighting the “wildly creative dialogue” and clever puzzle design. Softonic stated that the game's "text-heavy nature and rough graphics" would not appeal to all players, but rated it highly for its "wit and emotional undertones"

=== Awards ===
- NYX Game Awards 2024 – Silver, Best Adventure Game (PC)
- AGS Awards 2024 – seven nominations, including Best Game and Best Writing
- AGOTY Awards 2024 – nominations for Best Puzzles and Best Lines of Dialogue
