= A Golden Wake =

2014 video game

- Developer: Grundislav Games
- Publishers: Wadjet Eye Games (2014-2020); Grundislav Games (2020-present)
- Designer: Francisco Gonzalez
- Engine: Adventure Game Studio
- Platforms: Linux; Microsoft Windows; OS X
- Release: October 9, 2014
- Genre: Adventure game

A Golden Wake is an adventure game developed by Grundislav Games. The game was released on October 9, 2014.

== Production ==
Cubed3 explains: "This is the first full project from the studio Grundislav Games, previously having produced what are essentially adventure game shorts". The one-man studio Grundislav Games was founded by game developer Francisco Gonzalez, who has a penchant for old-school adventure games. In a July 2014 interview, he explained "I first got the idea and began doing the research in late 2009/early 2010. I didn't actually start seriously working on it until around 2012, after I finished up with the last game in my Ben Jordan series. I'd say I've gotten the bulk of it done in the past 10 months, however, as I've been working on it full time." Though the developer's first commercial product is set in a real historical setting, Gonzalez's aim was to "emphasize the time period and capture a sense of place" rather than design a piece of edutainment. He said "At its heart this is an adventure game. I'm not trying to hit people over the head with history". Gonzalez listed The Dagger of Amon Ra (1992), Gabriel Knight: Sins of the Fathers (1993), Grim Fandango (1998), L.A. Noire (2011), and Deus Ex: Human Revolution (2011) as influences for the game. Explaining the context of this game within the industry, IndieHaven wrote: "A Golden Wake explores a slice of both real and video game history. It's historical fiction wrapped in the skin of a point-and-click adventure game employing a visual style and game mechanics popularized in the 1990s when games like Monkey Island and Gabriel Knight first hit the shelves. It comes at a time when the genre is making a comeback with Telltale Games finding success with The Walking Dead and The Wolf Among Us and titles like The Room series getting critical acclaim." In regard to distribution, Gonzalez commented "Like all the other Wadjet Eye games, the initial launch will be on PC only, but the game will be ported to other platforms in the future (including iOS)".

== Plot ==
The plot is described as follows:

Set against the backdrop of the Florida Land Boom of the 1920s, A Golden Wake is a story of an innocent man's descent into greed and corruption, and his eventual redemption. Based on actual events and featuring real life locations and historical figures, you must guide Alfie on his journey to reach the top of the real estate game as he deals with shady salesmen, cutthroat bootleggers, corrupt politicians, and much more, all while swept up in the events surrounding the inception of Coral Gables, Florida, The City Beautiful.

== Gameplay ==
Hulking Reviewer explains the gameplay:

The controls are the standard point-and-click scheme with the left-click used to interact with an object and the right-click to look at an object. And you access the inventory by moving the cursor to the top of the screen, and when you select an object the cursor blinks while the name of the selected object shows at the bottom left of the screen.

== Critical reception ==
In a preview of promotional material, Destructoid wrote, "these early screens and details have me excited. It's like The Colonel's Bequest and Boardwalk Empire are coming together, just as I always dreamed." In a preview, Hulking Reviewer wrote "The deliberate story build-up suggested a well-crafted tale that wasn't just about going through the motions from one puzzle to the next but trying to pull you into its world completely. And that's one of the things that makes an adventure game a classic. So whether it's condemning a man's house because of violations or stealing designs, it all feels part of an overarching scheme that will lead to some exciting and rewarding scenarios. The hands-on preview was only about 2 chapters but it appears to me that Wadjet Eye Games has another gem on its hands". Rock Paper Shotgun wrote "Expect shady salesmen, cutthroat bootleggers, corrupt politicians, and (of course) the mafia to play major roles. Sounds like my kind of party." Cubed3 wrote "A Golden Wake is certainly not without its problems, then, but it's shaping up to be a fresh take on the genre and an interesting game in its own right. While the puzzles aren't always amazing and the story takes a few strange turns, there's incredible attention to detail and a contagious enthusiasm running through the entire experience. Anyone with so much as a passing interest in this period of history shouldn't miss it, but everyone else should take a look, too – they just might find themselves drawn in." Hardcore Gamer said, "Though not the most pulse-pounding adventure on the market, A Golden Wake offers an authentic glimpse into one of the defining events of the 20th century."

In 2014, A Golden Wake was nominated for 10 AGS Awards but did not win any.
