= Wadjet Eye Games =

Video game developer and publisher based in New York City

- Type: Private
- Industry: Video games
- Founded: 2006
- Headquarters: United States
- Key people: Dave Gilbert
- Products: Blackwell series Primordia; Gemini Rue; Unavowed; The Excavation of Hob's Barrow; Old Skies; Nighthawks
- Number of employees: 3
- Website: Wadjet Eye Games

Wadjet Eye Games is an American independent video game developer, voice casting/directing contractor/subcontractor and publisher which specialises in point-and-click adventure games. It was founded in 2006 by Dave Gilbert as a means to publish his own games, but has since expanded to publishing games by other designers as well. All games created by Gilbert take place in New York City and characters from other games have cameo appearances.

== History ==
Gilbert produced The Shivah in 2006 for MAGS, the monthly one-month Adventure Game Studio game contest. After winning the contest, Gilbert continued to improve The Shivah, adding voice acting and extra puzzles, then released it as a commercial title. It was originally sold via Manifesto Games, until Gilbert formed Wadjet Eye Games in order to sell it himself and move into game design full-time.

In 2006, Wadjet Eye released The Blackwell Legacy, the first in the Blackwell series. This was followed in 2007 by the continuation of the series, Blackwell Unbound. In February 2008, a publishing deal was announced between Wadjet Eye Games and PlayFirst. Under the agreement, Wadjet Eye Games would develop a casual adventure game for PlayFirst. The resulting game, Emerald City Confidential, a noir story set in L. Frank Baum's Land of Oz, was released on 19 February 2009. That year also saw the release of the third Blackwell game, The Blackwell Convergence.

In 2010, Wadjet Eye Games published the first game developed by somebody other than Gilbert; this was Puzzle Bots, a casual puzzle game developed by Ivy Games. Further third-party games published by Wadjet Eye Games through 2011 and 2012 were Gemini Rue, Da New Guys, Resonance and Primordia. In February 2013 it was announced that Wadjet Eye Games would be publishing their first portable release, with Gemini Rue being ported to both iPhone and iPad.

At one point Wadjet Eye was planning a game based on comic books by Vertigo.

== Awards and accolades ==
Wadjet Eye Games was nominated for the Best New Studio award at the Game Developers Choice Awards in 2007, the same year that Gilbert received the AGS Lifetime Achievement Award In 2008, Gamasutra listed Wadjet Eye among their top 20 breakthrough developers.

The second edition of the book The Art of Point-and-Click Adventure Games named Wadjet Eye Games as the successor to Sierra Entertainment and LucasArts and credited it with keeping the point-and-click genre alive.

== Games ==
Title	Developer	Release date	Metacritic Score
The Shivah	Dave Gilbert	August 14, 2006	—
The Blackwell Legacy	Dave Gilbert	December 23, 2006	80
Blackwell Unbound	Dave Gilbert	September 4, 2007	—
Emerald City Confidential	Dave Gilbert	February 19, 2009	71
The Blackwell Convergence	Dave Gilbert	July 22, 2009	—
Puzzle Bots	Ivy Games	May 7, 2010	—
Gemini Rue	Joshua Nuernberger	February 24, 2011	82
The Blackwell Deception	Dave Gilbert	October 12, 2011	73
Da New Guys: Day of the Jackass	Icebox Games	February 29, 2012	56
Resonance	XII Games	June 19, 2012	76
Primordia	Wormwood Studios	December 5, 2012	72
The Shivah: Kosher Edition	Dave Gilbert	November 20, 2013	67
The Blackwell Epiphany	Dave Gilbert	April 24, 2014	83
A Golden Wake	Grundislav Games	October 9, 2014	68
Technobabylon	Technocrat Games	May 21, 2015	82
Shardlight	Francisco Gonzalez/Ben Chandler	March 8, 2016	75
Unavowed	Dave Gilbert	August 8, 2018	87
Strangeland	Wormwood Studios	May 25, 2021	77
The Excavation of Hob's Barrow	Cloak and Dagger Games	September 28, 2022	80 (PC), 83 (NS)
Old Skies	Dave Gilbert	April 23, 2025	81 (PC), 75 (NS)
Nighthawks	Curiosity Engine	September 22, 2026	82
