= Nighthawks (video game) =

2026 video game about vampires

- Developer: Curiosity Engine
- Publisher: Wadjet Eye Games
- Designer: Richard Cobbett
- Platforms: Linux; macOS; Windows
- Release: 22 September 2026
- Genre: Visual novel

Nighthawks is a supernatural video game created by Richard Cobbett and published by Wadjet Eye Games in 2026. The plot involves the player character, a newly born vampire, takes over a struggling nightclub in a world where vampires and humans are learning to coexist.

== Reception ==
Reception

Aggregate score
Aggregator	Score
Metacritic	82/100

Review score
Publication	Score
PC Gamer (US)	89/100

Nighthawks received a score of 82/100 on review aggregator Metacritic, indicating generally favorable reviews by critics.

PC Gamer described Nighthawks as "a novel vampire RPG that's also a vampire novel's worth of great writing." Rock Paper Shotgun said it was "a series of vignettes that sometimes excel but more often falter". GamesRadar+ compared it favorably to Vampire: The Masquerade – Bloodlines 2.
