= Blackwell (series) =

Video game series

- Artwork for the Blackwell Bundle compilation. From left to right: Convergence, Unbound and Legacy.
- Genre: Graphic adventure
- Developer: Wadjet Eye Games
- Publisher: Wadjet Eye Games
- Creator: Dave Gilbert
- Composers: Peter Gresser, Thomas Regin
- Platforms: Microsoft Windows, OS X, Linux, iOS, Android
- First release: The Blackwell Legacy; December 23, 2006
- Latest release: The Blackwell Epiphany; April 24, 2014

Blackwell is a series of five graphic adventure video games from independent game developer Wadjet Eye Games, created by Dave Gilbert. The games' plots focus on Rosangela Blackwell, a spiritual medium, and her spirit guide Joey Mallone, who work to help ghosts transition to the afterlife.

== Games ==
All five games are point-and-click graphic adventure games.

=== The Blackwell Legacy ===
The first game in the series, The Blackwell Legacy, was released on December 23, 2006. The protagonist of the game is Rosangela Blackwell (Rosa), who is a young freelance writer living a solitary life in New York City. Her only close relative, her aunt Lauren Blackwell, dies following years of being in a coma in the local hospital. Shortly afterward, Rosa is asked to write about a suicide in a college dorm for a small newspaper. Rosa experiences headaches throughout the day culminating in a ghost named Joey Mallone appearing in her apartment. He explains that she is a "medium" like her aunt and that her job is to assist ghosts stuck in the real world to "move on". Reluctantly she accepts the explanation and proceeds to solve a case about the girl whose ghost is now haunting a dog park. She discovers that the girl is one of three close friends, who summoned a restless ghost with Ouija board; two of the friends have already committed suicide. She learns how to help the ghost. The third girl also attempts to commit suicide but is taken to the hospital, where Rosa finds her and the restless ghost. She then helps the ghost move on as well. Afterwards, Rosa asks Joey why did Lauren stop being a medium. Joey says it is because Lauren wanted to raise Rosa after the latter's parents died in a car accident. Pondering this, and with her writing career going nowhere fast, Rosa decides to follow in her aunt's footsteps and become a medium full-time.

== Characters ==
=== Rosa Blackwell ===
The main protagonist of the series, living in New York City during the 2000s. Having been brought up in foster care after the early death of her parents and Institutionalisation of her aunt, Rosa is a reserved introvert who struggles with communication, though she is hardly interested in befriending others. She starts the series as a fledgling writer and journalist, but quickly embraces her role as a medium. Over the course of the series, she becomes determined and fierce in her resolve to help ghosts move on, even accumulating multiple restraining orders over the course of her work. She is incredibly defiant at times, and can be dismissive of Joey, but always cares enough to do the right thing.

=== Joey Mallone ===
The spirit guide of the Blackwell family. Joey originally hails from the Roaring 20s, working in a tailor shop before being gunned down by mobsters. Through an interesting chain of events not fully disclosed, he ended up becoming tied to the Blackwell family, starting with Rosa's grandmother. Joey is dry and sarcastic, frequently lamenting over the eternal and thankless nature of his work as a spirit guide, and is unable to be more than 30 feet away from his medium at all times. He does, however, genuinely care for the Blackwell women that he is stuck with, and tries his best to protect them when they are in danger.

=== Lauren Blackwell ===
Rosa's aunt on her father's side, and the protagonist of the second game. Lauren was a medium during the 70s in New York City. Though Lauren largely resigned to her life as a medium and resents it for separating her from her brother, she is still very amiable and, unlike Rosa, is able to charm info out of people more readily. Lauren would later adopt Rosa following her brother's untimely death, vowing to quit being a medium. However, she wound up being institutionalized for decades before finally dying at the beginning of the first game. She comically reveals in the final game that she had tried to prep Rosa for life as a medium by dressing up her prized teddy bear like Joey.

=== Nishanti Sharma ===
Nishanti, a resident of the same apartment complex as Rosa, possesses contrasting personality traits that make her an amiable and outgoing individual. Notably, she possesses a high EQ, which allows her to perceive things that many others cannot, inadvertently aiding Rosa in her ghostly encounters. In later games, Nishanti embarks on travels, and communication with Rosa is limited to email. Despite their close proximity, Nishanti remains unaware of Rosa's spiritual medium abilities.

=== The Countess ===
The primary antagonist of the second and third games. The Countess was originally a spirit medium who lived during the Roaring 20s. Her real name is Jocelyn Contis. Unlike Rosa, Jocelyn resented her job as a medium, preferring to spend her nights dancing with her peers than with Madeline, her guide. Shortly after the Great Depression hit, Jocelyn decided to sever her connection to Madeline, and in doing so, she would go mad looking for a new spirit guide, and began referring to herself as the Countess. She would attach herself to other humans and, in the process, create more ghosts rather than help them move on. She is killed by Lauren, but doesn't rest until Rosa helps her spirit move on several decades later.

=== Madeline ===
An ally turned antagonist. Madeline appears to be of royal lineage of some European monarchy from several centuries prior, though some of her dialogue suggests that the era she once lived in is much more recent. At first, she is kind and helpful, providing Rosa with the assistance necessary to deal with the Countess. However, it is revealed later that she is numb and sociopathic, brought about by her work as a spirit guide and is unable to pass on. Originally serving as the spirit guide of the Countess, Madeline was abandoned by her and stuck in Limbo before plotting to return to life so that she may eventually die properly. To that end, she tried to possess the other mediums of the Blackwell family and take their bodies, only to fail and cause them to go insane. Madeline would then try to forcibly destroy her spirit at the cost of everyone else's, only to be stopped by Rosa. She eventually passes on in peace thanks to the efforts of Rosa.

=== Sam Durkin ===
Rosa's only ally in the NYPD. Gruff and tough, Sam is a detective who, after meeting Rosa in the fourth game, regularly employs her as a tipster to generate leads on cold cases, giving Rosa a critical financial lifeline. By his own choice, he does not ask for details about the nature of Rosa's abilities and keeps his distance from her, but otherwise respects Rosa. He is also the detective who saved Rosa from her aunt's tantrum when Lauren went insane, and thus continues to look out for Rosa even when the latter keeps getting into trouble with the law working as a medium.

== Reception ==
Aggregate review scores
Game	Year	GameRankings	Metacritic
The Blackwell Legacy	2006	79%	80/100
Blackwell Unbound	2007	85%	-
The Blackwell Convergence	2009	76%	-
The Blackwell Deception	2011	81%	73/100
The Blackwell Epiphany	2014	84%	83/100

Adventure Gamers gave 3.5/5 to the first four games, and 4.5/5 to Epiphany. Gamezebo gave 3.5/5 stars to Legacy and Unbound, 4/5 stars to Convergence and Epiphany, and 4.5/5 stars to Deception.
