= Adventure Game Studio =

Graphic design game tool

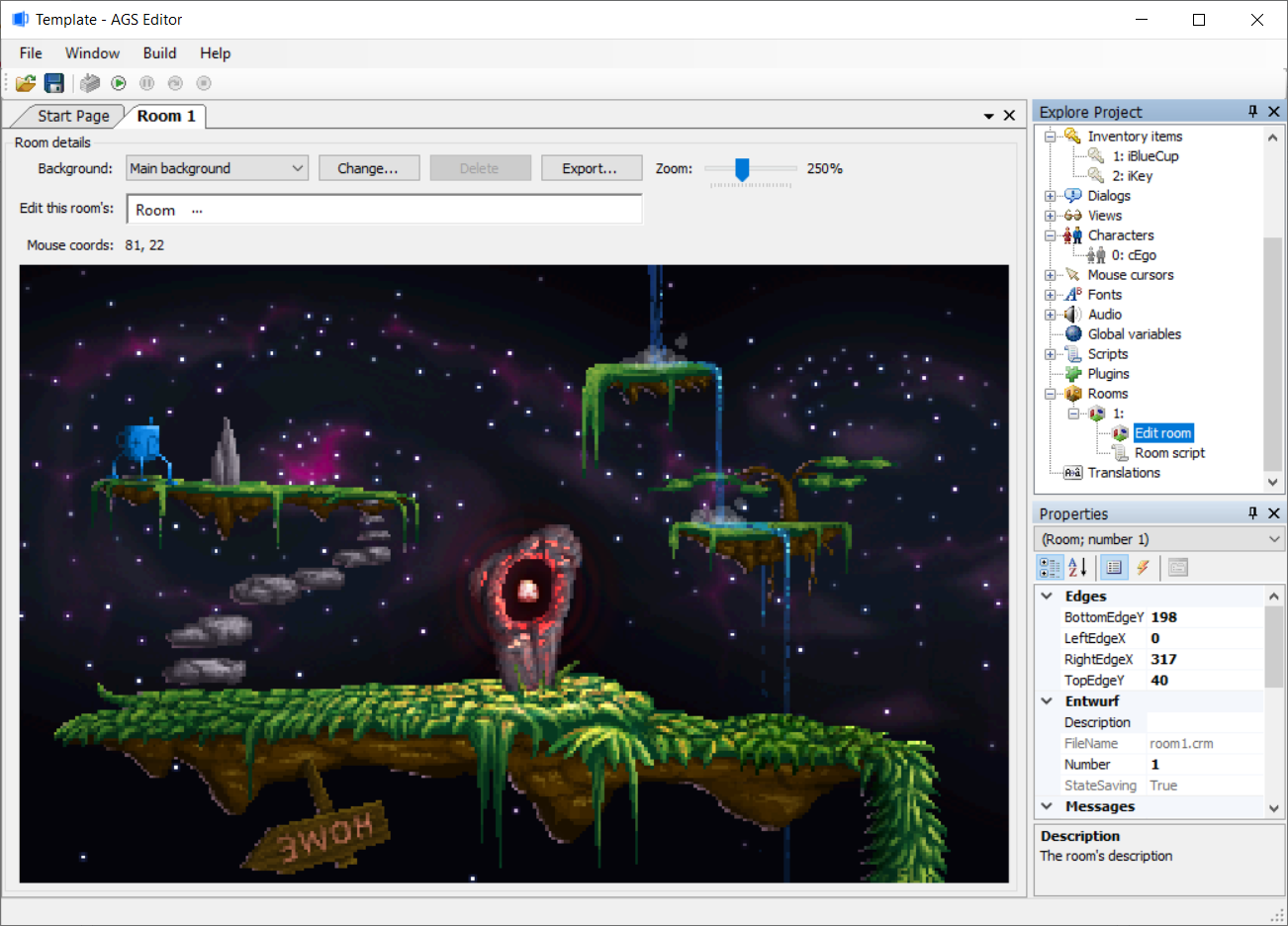
- The room editor in AGS v3.3.3
- Developer: Chris Jones
- Release: 1997; 29 years ago
- Stable release: 3.6.2.22 / October 22, 2026; 15 days ago
- Preview release: 4.0 Alpha 35 / October 28, 2026; 9 days ago
- Written in: C++, C, C#
- Operating system: Windows
- Platform: Personal computer
- Available in: English
- Type: Game creation system
- License: Artistic License version 2 (editor & runtime)
- Website: www.adventuregamestudio.co.uk
- Repository: github.com/adventuregamestudio/ags

Adventure Game Studio (AGS) is an open source development tool primarily used to create graphic adventure games. It is aimed at intermediate-level game designers, and combines an integrated development environment (IDE) with a scripting language based on the C programming language to process game logic.

== History ==
Adventure Game Studio was created by British programmer Chris Jones in 1997 as an MS-DOS program entitled "Adventure Creator". Jones was inspired by Sierra On-Line's adventure game interface, specifically as showcased in Space Quest IV. The first version of Adventure Creator allowed users to create only low-resolution keyboard-controlled games.

Lassi Quest was released as the first complete AGS game in late 1999. The engine gained popularity with the release of Ben "Yahtzee" Croshaw's Rob Blanc and Philip Reed's Larry Vales games in 2000-2001.

Version 3.0 in January 2008 included a complete rewrite of the editor using the .NET Framework and an update to the game engine to support 3D hardware acceleration.

On 26 October 2010, Chris Jones released the source code for the editor under the terms of the Artistic License, version 2. On 27 April 2011, the runtime engine code was released under the same licence.

By 2015, community developers were maintaining and improving the engine and IDE, and began to implement cross-platform capabilities as well as support for more modern screen resolutions (4:3, 16:9 and custom high resolutions).

== Capabilities ==
The editor and runtime engine were originally designed for Microsoft Windows operating systems; the runtime engine was ported to Android, iOS, Linux, Mac OS X and PlayStation Portable after the release of the source code. Prior to AGS 2.7, an MS-DOS engine was also available; this has since been discontinued. It is not yet possible to run the editor on operating systems other than Windows without an emulator or API wrapper such as Wine.

AGS can create games with a graphical range from 256 colours and a resolution of 320×200, to truecolor games with any higher resolution supported by the player's graphic adapter and an alpha channel. It also supports graphics filters: nearest-neighbor interpolation (2x, 3x, and 4x), and hqx (2x and 3x). Version 2.61 supports the following multimedia formats: mod, wav, xm, MIDI, ogg, mp3, avi. Version 2.72 also supports Impulse Tracker and S3M.

== Community ==
The AGS community is based on the AGS Forum, the AGS Internet Relay Chat channel and Discord channel. There are real-world meetings of the community each year, known as "Mittens".

== AGS Awards ==
The AGS Awards were founded in 2001 and are awarded annually to the best games created with AGS, in multiple categories. The AGS Awards received coverage from sites like Destructoid, Rock, Paper, Shotgun, IndieGames and GameSetWatch.

== Reception and usage ==
Thousands of games have been produced using AGS, among them commercially successful games such as Al Emmo and the Lost Dutchman's Mine, The Cat Lady, The Phantom Fellows, or The Journey Down.

Wadjet Eye Games is an indie game developer that has created most of its commercial titles using AGS, such as the Blackwell series of games. They also publish AGS games by other developers, such as Primordia by Wormwood Studios, Resonance by XII Games, and Gemini Rue by Joshua Nuernberger.

Development teams AGD Interactive and Infamous Adventures have remade and updated King's Quest and other Sierra releases. Fans have done the same with LucasArts adventure games.

== See also ==
- Category:Adventure Game Studio games
