= Adventure Gamers =

Adventure games website

- Website type: Gaming website
- Website: www.adventuregamers.com
- Commercial: No
- Launched: March 1999; 27 years ago

Adventure Gamers is a computer game website which was dedicated to the genre of adventure games until 2025, when its new owners turned it into an online gambling promotion site. Created by Marek Bronstring in March 1999, it has published reviews and previews of adventure games, as well as opinion articles and interviews with game designers.

The site has been described as having "offered some of the best coverage of the adventure game genre available on the net" by Time Extension. Adventure Gamers was referenced in the print book Rogue Leaders: The Story of LucasArts. Ragnar Tornquist, the creator of the adventure games The Longest Journey and Dreamfall: The Longest Journey, has stated that the reviews on Adventure Gamers have been "very important to [him]". In addition, Straandlooper, the developer of Hector: Badge of Carnage, called Adventure Gamers "one of the foremost and widely respected websites about adventure games".

Bronstring sold the site to Ivo Teel in 2016. He took over as editor from Jack Allin in 2022, which allegedly led to an exodus in writing staff.

In June 2025, new owners of the site shut down its forums and changed its "About" page to expand its focus to online gambling. Several adventure game developers reacted negatively to this development. Former Adventure Gamers chief editor Jack Allin had already left to found Adventure Game Hotspot, a spiritual successor to the site, in 2022.

== The Aggie Awards ==
Every year from 2009 to 2024, Adventure Gamers hosted the Aggie Awards, which awarded adventure games of the previous year (Note: Episodic video games were awarded for the year the last episode was released.) for their merits in several categories from concept, art direction, and story, to the adventure game of the year. The categories were divided in choices made by website staff and by readers.

Aggie Award for Best Adventure of the Year
Year	AG Staff's Choice	Readers' Choice	Ref.
2008	Sam & Max: Season Two		
2009	Tales of Monkey Island		
2010	Last Window: The Secret of Cape West	The Whispered World	
2011	Portal 2	The Book of Unwritten Tales	
2012	The Walking Dead		
2013	Brothers: A Tale of Two Sons	Cognition: An Erica Reed Thriller	
2014	The Blackwell Epiphany	Tesla Effect: A Tex Murphy Adventure	
2015	Stasis	Life Is Strange	
2016	King's Quest	Kathy Rain	
2017	Thimbleweed Park		
2018	Unavowed		
2019	Outer Wilds	Whispers of a Machine	
2020	There Is No Game: Wrong Dimension	Röki	
2021	The Forgotten City	The Darkside Detective: A Fumble in the Dark	
2022	Return to Monkey Island		
2023	Stasis: Bone Totem	American Arcadia	

== See also ==
- Just Adventure
