= Praesepe (company) =

- Industry: Gambling
- Founded: 2007
- Founder: Nick Harding
- Headquarters: Milton Keynes, UK
- Parent: Gauselmann
- Subsidiaries: Cashino

Praesepe plc, formerly known as Aldgate, is a British bingo, arcade gaming and gambling company formed in 2007 and is based in Milton Keynes. It owns the high street gambling arcade chain Cashino.

== History ==
Praesepe was founded in October 2007 by Nick Harding and a private equity firm Marwyn Partners as Aldgate Capital PLC.

In 2008, the company acquired Shipley Amusements for £25 million.

In autumn 2012, Praesepe became a subsidiary of Gauselmann, the German gaming and gambling company founded by Paul Gauselmann.
