= Caesars Palace (disambiguation) =

Caesars Palace is a casino and luxury hotel in the Las Vegas Strip of Paradise, Nevada. Its name, or a variation of its name, is given to the following casinos:

- Caesars Atlantic City in Atlantic City, New Jersey
- Caesars Windsor in Windsor, Ontario
- Caesars Palace at Sea by Crystal Cruises

== Other uses ==
- Caesars Casino Online
- Caesar (band), a Dutch indie rock trio from Amsterdam
- Caesars (band), a Swedish indie rock band from Stockholm
- Caesars Palace, a video game for the Nintendo Entertainment System
  - Super Caesars Palace, a sequel video game for the Super Nintendo Entertainment System; also released for Sega Genesis and Game Gear as Caesars Palace
