= Beavis and Butt-Head =

American adult animated comedy series

- Logo for the 2022 revival
- Also known as: Mike Judge's Beavis and Butt-Head
- Genre: Animated sitcom; Adult animation; Satire; Black comedy; Slapstick
- Created by: Mike Judge
- Voices of: Mike Judge; Tracy Grandstaff; Kristofer Brown; Toby Huss
- Theme music composer: Mike Judge
- Country of origin: United States
- Original language: English
- No. of seasons: 12
- No. of episodes: 317 + 2 pilots (list of episodes)

Production
- Executive producers: Abby Terkuhle; Mike Judge; John Altschuler; Dave Krinsky; Yvette Kaplan; Michael Rotenberg; Tom Lassally; Lew Morton; Chris Prynoski; Shannon Prynoski; Ben Kalina; Antonio Canobbio; Chris Marcil
- Producers: John Andrews; Matthew Mahoney
- Running time: 4–11 minutes (s. 1–8); 22 minutes (s. 9–present); 12–21 minutes (specials)
- Production companies: MTV Animation; Paramount Television Studios (Note: Credited as MTV Production Development on season 8 and as MTV Entertainment Studios on seasons 9–11.); Judgmental Films; Ternion Productions; 3 Arts Entertainment; Titmouse, Inc.

Original release
- Network: MTV
- Release: March 8, 1993 – December 29, 2011
- Network: Paramount+
- Release: August 4, 2022 – June 29, 2023
- Network: Comedy Central
- Release: September 3, 2025 – present

Related
- Beavis and Butt-Head Do America; Beavis and Butt-Head Do the Universe; Daria

Beavis and Butt-Head is an American adult animated television comedy series created by Mike Judge for MTV. The series follows Beavis and Butt-Head, both voiced by Judge, a pair of teenage slackers characterized by their apathy, lack of intelligence, lowbrow humor and love for hard rock and heavy metal. The original series juxtaposes slice-of-life short subjects in which the characters embark on misadventures and comment on music videos in the fictional town of Highland, Texas.

Judge created Beavis and Butt-Head when making animated shorts. Two of these shorts, including Frog Baseball, were broadcast by MTV's animation showcase Liquid Television. MTV commissioned a full series, which over its seven seasons, became its most popular program. The original series ran from 1993 to 1997 and returned in 2011. In 2022, a new series began in Paramount+. Three years later, it was moved to Comedy Central, which renewed the series for an eleventh and twelfth season.

During its initial run, Beavis and Butt-Head received acclaim for its satirical commentary on society, as well as criticism for its alleged influence on adolescents. The characters became pop culture icons among Generation X viewers, with their sniggering and dialogue becoming catchphrases. The series was adapted into the films Beavis and Butt-Head Do America (1996) and Beavis and Butt-Head Do the Universe (2022). Adaptations and tie-in products include comic books, video games, books, and music. A spin-off series, Daria, ran for five seasons from 1997 to 2002.

== Premise ==
Beavis and Butt-Head are two unintelligent teenage slackers with little to no regard to anything outside themselves. They are characterized by their complete lack of intelligence, apathy, and lowbrow humor, desire to "score", and love for hard rock and heavy metal. They live in an empty house in the fictional town of Highland, Texas—with a couch and a television set—where they attend Highland High and work at the fast food chain Burger World. Their age is never specified, but creator Mike Judge said they are "probably" 15.

They spend their time watching television, drinking unhealthy beverages, eating, and embarking on mundane, sordid, and low-minded adventures and misadventures, which more often than not involve vandalism, abuse, violence, animal cruelty, or their desire to "score". Over the course of the series, they developed more distinct personalities, with Butt-Head as the devious leader and Beavis becoming his hyperactive follower. When Beavis consumes high amounts of caffeine, sugar, or medication, he becomes Cornholio, a hyperactive alter ego.

Most episodes integrate sequences in which Beavis and Butt-Head watch music videos and offer commentary. They prefer videos with "explosions, loud guitars, screaming and death", and favor rock bands such as the Butthole Surfers, Corrosion of Conformity, Metallica, etc. The music video sections allow the characters to provide diegetic commentary on the contents of the video; Judge said they allow the characters to say "things that are a little smarter than they ought to be". Judge improvised the dialog on the spot, which editors would then cut together with animation from existing footage.

Judge said he saw Beavis and Butt-Head as "pretty positive characters, generally speaking ... They usually think everything's pretty cool. Or, in one way or another, everything sucks." He said his perception of the characters changed over the years: "When I first started out with the first show, which was Frog Baseball, they were just two guys that I would definitely want to keep my distance from ... But, by the end of the series, I would think that two guys like that would at least be fun to sit and watch TV with." Judge composed the series' theme song, which is descended from AC/DC's "Gone Shootin'". He later said that the central guitar riff of the theme is that song played backwards.

The 2022 revival of the show introduces the duo's parallel universe counterparts who are middle-aged, called "Old Beavis and Butt-Head". They are unemployed, live in a motel-style apartment, and have health issues.

== Cast in order of appearance ==
- Mike Judge as Beavis, Butt-Head, Principal McVicker, Coach Buzzcut, David Van Driessen, Tom Anderson, and others
- Tracy Grandstaff as Daria Morgendorffer, Mrs. Stevenson, and others
- Kristofer Brown as various
- Toby Huss as Todd and others

== Development ==
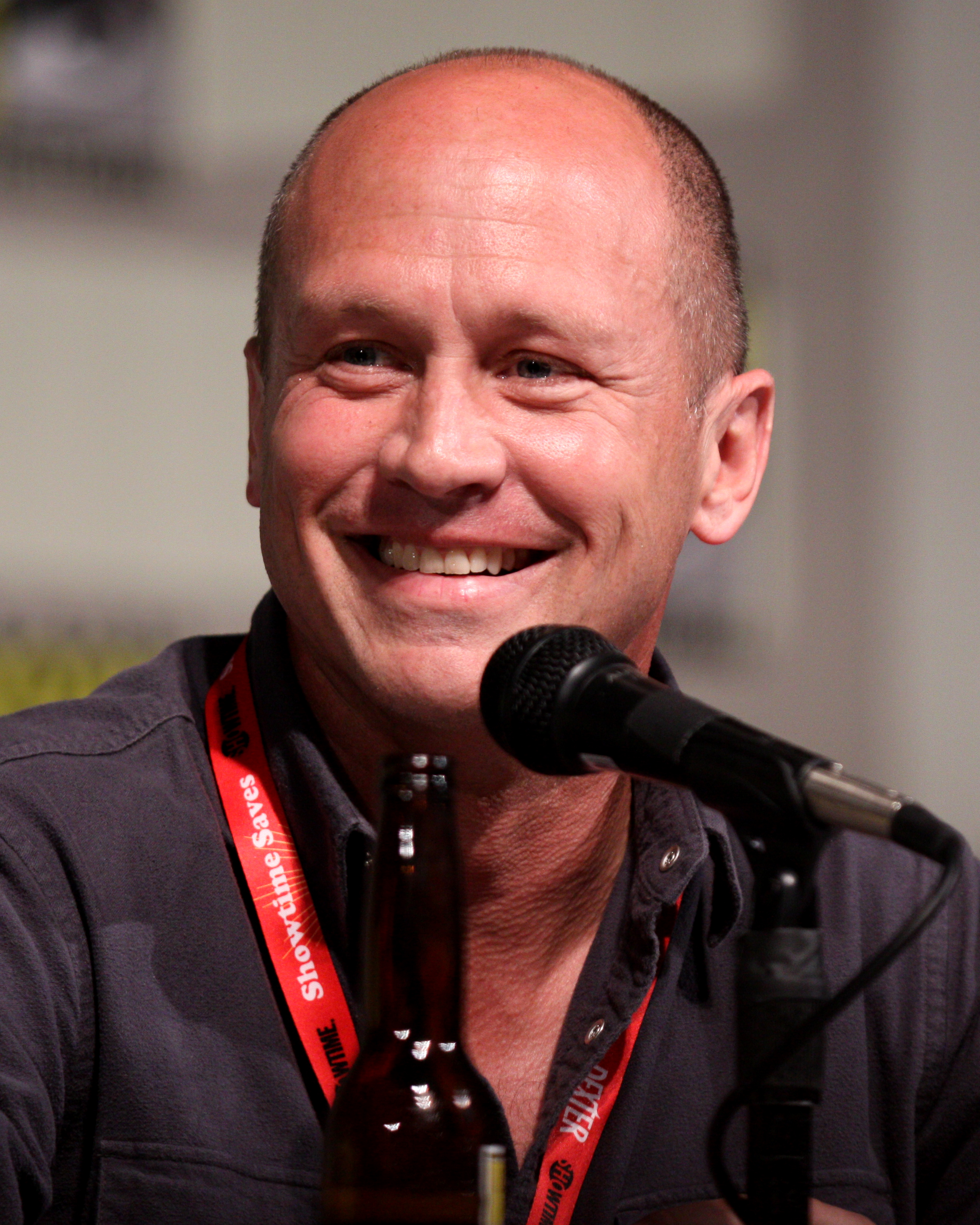
Mike Judge (pictured in 2011) created Beavis and Butt-Head and voices most of the characters.

Beavis and Butt-Head was created by the American animator Mike Judge. He graduated with a degree in physics but struggled to connect with his work in computer science. In the late 1980s, he began making short animated films on his own; he taught himself how to draw and animate and would shoot his projects with a cheap Bolex 16mm film camera. He made several shorts, including Frog Baseball, which marked the first appearances of the characters. Judge cold-called networks to pitch this concept, and would send out VHS tapes with prints of his films. The voice of Beavis was based on a kid in his high school calculus class, who would always snicker in a distinct way at their attractive female teacher.

The art style of what became Beavis and Butt-Head was intentionally disruptive; Judge wanted it to look like "it was drawn by an insane person." The comic strip Peanuts was an unlikely influence: Judge stated that Schulz's line work and sketchy sensibility worked its way into his as well. He was also inspired by the work of John Kricfalusi, and fellow Texas animator Wes Archer and his film Jack Mack and Rad Boy Go! Aesthetically, Judge likened the program's best episodes to comfort food: "I think there's something kind of relaxing about it," he noted. He claimed the wacky comedy of The Beverly Hillbillies was an influence on the show. Other elements of the setting are left up to the viewer's imagination: there is little said of the characters' backstories, or their parents, and it's unclear whose house the characters are couch-surfing. This aspect of the show was also inspired by Peanuts, where the characters also seem to inhabit a liminal world without parents.

Originally it is not mentioned in which state they live, and Mike Judge imagined them living in a small town in New Mexico. But when a background artist, without Judge's knowledge, wrote Texas on cars' license plates, he decided that they lived in Texas. MTV bought Frog Baseball and two other films to air as part of its late-night animation showcase, Liquid Television, from which it commissioned the series.

== Production ==
=== 1993–1997: First seven seasons and first film ===
In September 1992, MTV flew Judge to their New York headquarters to commission a full series of the concept. Executives initially approved 35 episodes; the show's seven-figure budget floored Judge, who had only made the films on his own for $800. The original series aired from 1993 to 1997. The show hired four staff writers, who would work up a treatment to present to Judge, who would then revise it to capture his artistic voice. One early writer, David Felton, found it best to write the characters from a primitive state of mind: "You go to that place in your mind where thoughts begin and then just stay there." The music video commentary was more-or-less improvised by Judge, who recorded them alongside an engineer in Austin. Judge had also tried to have the duo comment on the network's other programs, like The Real World, but found that recording dialogue on top of dialogue too confusing for viewers.

After writing, the episodes were storyboarded and went to the layout phase of animation, before being transferred to cels and photographed. Judge estimated it could "take anywhere from five months to a year before it's on the air." To save time, the animators made a stock selection of different movements like head turns to simplify editing the program. Though earlier seasons were produced at MTV's midtown Manhattan campus, Judge preferred to produce the show from his Austin home; in a Los Angeles Times piece from 1994, it observes: "Judge makes occasional trips to New York to approve the music videos that will be used in the series and to take care of other business, but generally works by fax, FedEx and video conferencing from Austin." Animation was also partially handled by studios in South Korea.

The show's first season was animated by J. J. Sedelmaier Productions, while the rest was handled by an in-house animation unit for MTV. Initially, the show's animators condensed the show's art style down to the industry standard of limited animation, which Judge likened to a Saturday morning-type style. He was specific about the show looking intentionally off-kilter: "there's something kind of interesting about seeing drawings animated that look like they were done by a 15-year-old in his notebook," he later said. In describing the show's style, Elizabeth Kolbert from The New York Times wrote: "They are drawn with purposeful crudeness and their motions have the jerky, seasick quality of marionettes."

Getting the show to a place to where Judge felt it was running smoothly was difficult. He was particularly embarrassed by the first five episodes of the show, with its crude animation style, and was ready to end the show after the second season, when he felt like he was running out of ideas. He claimed he got a "second wind" in the series' third season, which is where he felt like it hit its stride, and he also felt particularly inspired during the series' fifth season. The relentless pace in making the show was wearing him down, which is why he chose to end the series after its 1996 film adaptation.

=== 2011: Eighth season ===
Judge returned to the characters to develop an additional season of the program, which aired in 2011. John Altschuler, formerly a writer for King of the Hill, told a Rolling Stone reporter that he saw signs that Mike Judge was thinking of reviving Beavis and Butt-Head. On more than one occasion, Judge told the writers that one of their ideas for an episode of King of the Hill would work well for Beavis and Butt-Head; eventually he concluded, "Maybe we should just actually make some good Beavis and Butt-Head episodes." Later, a Lady Gaga video convinced Van Toffler of the tenability of a Beavis and Butt-Head revival: "I felt like there was a whole crop of new artists—and what the world sorely missed was the point of view that only Beavis and Butt-Head could bring." As in the old series, Beavis and Butt-Head are high school students who, among other things, criticize contemporary music videos. In updating the show for its millennial-era audience, the duo also watch episodes of Jersey Shore, Ultimate Fighting Championship matches, and amateur videos from YouTube. Some characters like Daria Morgendorffer did not return. According to TMZ, MTV had not asked Tracy Grandstaff to reprise that role; Judge confirmed that the character was limited to a cameo appearance. As the animation business had switched to digital tools in the time between, this version used digital ink and paint, with each drawing simply scanned into a computer and colored.

The episodes debuted in the United States and Canada on October 27, 2011; further, its premiere was a ratings hit, with an audience of 3.3 million total viewers. This number eventually dwindled to 900,000 by the season's end, mainly due to its challenging time slot pitted against regular prime time shows on other networks. As part of a promotional campaign, cinemas screening Jackass 3D opened the feature film with a 3-D Beavis and Butt-Head short subject. The revival encompassed 24 episodes (12 half-hour programs), but only lasted one season. In a later interview, Judge confirmed "Things didn't quite click. There were a lot of problems on the animation side of things, trying to get it to look right. I don't know if that played into it. But it actually did pretty well — the ratings were good. MTV just didn't want to do any more." The network's demographic had also shifted to include more female viewers, complicating the show's appeal. In an interview with Howard Stern in 2014, Judge mentioned that while the show's ratings were high, meeting this key demographic was a factor in its cancellation. He also said that MTV was close to selling it to another network, but it became "lost in deal stuff". Judge remained outwardly open to producing more shows, suggesting in 2014 that there was a chance of pitching Beavis and Butt-Head to another network. Conflicting with the actual season number, MTV incorrectly refers to this season as "Season 9", even though it is technically the eighth season. Later reruns of this iteration of the program were broadcast on MTV Classic in the mid-2010s.

=== 2022–present: Second film and revival ===
Over a decade after the last iteration of the series, the series was again revived, this time in the streaming era for Paramount+. The concept of relaunching the show a second time came from Judge, who created a concert intro for the band Portugal. The Man using the characters. He had not intended to return to the characters again, but found performing the voices fun. He entered discussions with Paramount Global, which was met with more "enthusiasm" than its previous MTV incarnation. The show was originally set to debut on Comedy Central, but was moved to help launch Paramount+. This revival also encompasses additional spin-offs and specials; a second feature film entitled Beavis and Butt-Head Do the Universe premiered on June 23, 2022, to kick-off the new series. The ninth season followed on August 4, 2022, with its tenth season debuting on April 20, 2023. In addition, in 2022 Paramount+ announced they were to host the full library of over 227 original episodes, newly remastered, with music videos intact for the first time. As of 2024, only some of these episodes have been hosted.

In the new series, Beavis and Butt-Head enter a "whole new Gen Z world" with meta-themes that are said to be relatable to both new fans, who may be unfamiliar with the original series, and old. This iteration has several episodes that depict the characters settling into middle-age, which is a concept Judge had suggested might be amusing over the years. While promoting his film Extract in 2009, Judge noted: "I wouldn't mind doing something with them as these two dirty old men sitting on the couch." Season 9 continues the concept of the Beavis and Butt-Head multiverse initially explored in its film predecessor; teenage Beavis and Butt-Head, Old Beavis and Butt-Head, and Smart Beavis and Butt-Head, all get their own dedicated episodes in the revival.

To promote the revival, Paramount+ attempted to break the world record for the largest serving of nachos at S. Alameda St in Los Angeles to celebrate the return of the show. They were successful and were given a ceremonial plaque from the Guinness World Records representative which stated "The largest serving of nachos was achieved by Mike Judge's Beavis and Butt-Head and Paramount+".

On June 5, 2024, it was announced that the revival had been renewed for an eleventh season, which premiered on September 3, 2025 on Comedy Central. The show has been renewed for a twelfth season, which premiered on October 14, 2026 on Comedy Central.

=== Live-action adaptation ===
The concept of taking the teens to the silver screen has been floated since the program was taken on the air. Paramount approached Judge at the start of the show's run to produce a live-action adaptation; David Geffen reportedly wanted to cast unknown actors for the role, but Judge refused. Judge has also suggested on more than one occasion directing a live-action adaptation of the program. He revealed that Johnny Depp had once expressed interest in the role of Beavis, having imitated the character while Marlon Brando imitated Butt-Head during the production of Don Juan DeMarco (1995). He initially disliked the idea of bringing the characters to the real world, but by 2008 had come to believe that "maybe there's something there"; around the same time, he also suggested that "Seann William Scott's kinda got Butt-Head eyes." A decade later, Judge told Radio Times "maybe it could be a live-action someday", then went on to speculate that Beavis might be homeless by now. In developing the series' second revival for Paramount+ in the 2020s, executives for the streamer had wanted a live-action Beavis and Butt-Head movie. Judge held auditions over Zoom for the project. He eventually talked the company into doing an animated movie instead to reestablish the characters first, with a future live-action movie still a possibility. Judge found it hard to replicate the characters' onscreen stupidity: "It was just sort of like watching teenagers imitate Beavis and Butt-Head."

== Episodes ==
Season	Episodes	Originally released		
Season	Episodes	First released	Last released	Network
Pilots	2	September 22, 1992	November 17, 1992	MTV (Liquid Television)
1	3	March 8, 1993	March 25, 1993	MTV
2	26	May 17, 1993	July 15, 1993	MTV
3	31	September 6, 1993	March 5, 1994	MTV
4	32	March 14, 1994	July 15, 1994	MTV
5	50	October 31, 1994	October 12, 1995	MTV
6	20	October 31, 1995	March 7, 1996	MTV
Do America		December 20, 1996		—N/a
7	41	January 26, 1997	November 28, 1997	MTV
8	22	October 27, 2011	December 29, 2011	MTV
Do the Universe		June 23, 2022		Paramount+
9	23	August 4, 2022	October 13, 2022	Paramount+
10	27	April 20, 2023	June 29, 2023	Paramount+
11	30	September 3, 2025	December 10, 2025	Comedy Central
12	27	October 14, 2026	December 16, 2026	Comedy Central

== Reception ==
=== Original run ===
Beavis and Butt-Head are so stupid and sublimely self-absorbed that the exterior world has little reality except as an annoyance or distraction. It would be easy to attack B&B as ignorant, vulgar, depraved, repulsive slobs. Of course they are. But that would miss the point, which is that Mike Judge's characters reflect parts of the society that produced them. To study B&B is to learn about a culture of narcissism, alienation, functional illiteracy, instant gratification and television zombiehood.

— Roger Ebert (1996)

During its original run, Beavis and Butt-Head was MTV's highest rated show. It was one of the most popular series when it premiered in 1993. In 1993, Rolling Stone described Beavis and Butt-Head as the "biggest phenomenon on MTV since the heyday of Michael Jackson". In Time, Kurt Andersen wrote that Beavis and Butt-Head "may be the bravest show ever run on national television". In 1997, Judge said the show was "my reaction to the whole fringe aspects of the political correctness movement".

Over its run, Beavis and Butt-Head received both positive and negative reactions from the public with its combination of lewd humor and implied criticism of society. It became the focus of criticism from some social critics such as Michael Medved, while others such as David Letterman and National Review defended it as a cleverly subversive vehicle for social criticism and a particularly creative and intelligent comedy. Either way, the show captured the attention of many young television viewers and is often considered a classic piece of 1990s youth culture and Generation X. Trey Parker and Matt Stone, creators of South Park, cite the series as an influence and compared it to the blues.

In 1997, Dan Tobin of The Boston Phoenix commented on the series' humor, saying it transformed "stupidity into a crusade, forcing us to acknowledge how little it really takes to make us laugh." In 1997, Ted Drozdowski of The Boston Phoenix described the 1997 Beavis and Butt-Head state as "reduced to self-parody of their self-parody". In the Baltimore Sun, David Zurawik said that Beavis and Butt-Head was "intelligent social satire that especially speaks in a meaningful way to a generation of teenage boys who are going through a uniquely complicated socialization at the hands of their baby-boomer parents". He said that its popularity may have taught audiences about male adolescence in the 1990s; he wrote that they were the postmodern descendants of Tom Sawyer and Huckleberry Finn, who were the "exemplars of males coming of age in American popular culture".

According to The Baltimore Sun, Beavis and Butt-Head are "at their most incorrect when it comes to sexuality and matters of gender. The nicest thing you can say about them in this regard is that they are budding misogynists." Rolling Stone described them as "thunderously stupid and excruciatingly ugly".

=== 2011 revival ===
The show's 2011 revival saw mixed reviews. Karen Olsson from The New York Times found it "dumber and funnier" than the original run, and Brian Lowry of Variety "still a rowdy, guilty hoot." Others found it tiresome: Slate's Troy Patterson called it a "grim" rehash, and James Poniewozik writing for Time found it not as "innovative" but still amusing. Matthew Gilbert from the Boston Globe felt television was now too dumb for them: "The problem is, there actually isn't much of a need for the two dopes and their anti-wisdom anymore." Conversely, Tom Carson for GQ found it "just right [...] Judge anticipated the trickle-down version of popland's Age of Meta."

=== 2022 revival ===
Its 2022 revival received critical acclaim. The New York Times's Jason Zinoman extolled the revival: "[the show] remains singular [...] they all hit comic notes ‌with moseying cadences you can't find elsewhere." Jesse Hassenger from The Wrap wrote "Beavis and Butt-Head have a tendency to mold their environment in their image. Or are they just so timelessly American that surprisingly little adaptation is necessary?" Daniel Fienberg at The Hollywood Reporter called it "solidly amusing, if rarely remarkable." Lowry, now for CNN, viewed it "proudly stupid"; similarly Andy Greene, for Rolling Stone, "really loved" the new take.

== Legacy ==
In December 2005, TV Guide ranked the duo's distinct laughing at #66 on their list of the 100 Greatest TV Quotes and Catchphrases. In 2012, TV Guide ranked Beavis and Butt-Head as one of the top 60 Greatest TV Cartoons of All Time. IGN ranked the series as the fifth greatest cartoon of all time on their list of the Top 100 Animated Series.

Various television series have done parodies or homages to the series, including The Simpsons, Family Guy, Arthur, Friends, The Critic, Two and a Half Men, Frasier, The Fairly OddParents, Boy Meets World, Full House, Saved by the Bell: The College Years, Robot Chicken, Married... with Children, Roseanne, Tiny Toon Adventures, Big Mouth, Drawn Together, Space Ghost Coast to Coast, Beverly Hills, 90210, 2 Broke Girls, among others.

On the April 13, 2024 episode of Saturday Night Live guest host Ryan Gosling, and cast regular Mikey Day, appeared in a sketch as live-action versions of Beavis and Butt-Head. The sketch went viral and received large media coverage and critical acclaim. The pair reprised the roles on the red carpet at The Fall Guy movie premiere.

=== Cultural impact ===
Bands getting positive comments from the characters would sometimes acknowledge the show providing an increase in their popularity: Rob Zombie and Kirk Windstein of Crowbar credited the show with growing their fanbase. Conversely, Winger guitarist Reb Beach claimed the show's portrayal of his band effectively ended their career.

In 1996, AC/DC included a animated video featuring the title characters at the beginning of their concerts for Ballbreaker World Tour. The song "The Arsonist" by the experimental-rock group Puscifer, off its 2015 album Money Shot, explicitly refers to Beavis with the fire theme of the song, including the chorus and a line "Beavis sure do love his matches."

== Controversies ==
During its first run in the 1990s, the show attracted multiple controversies over its content. "The downward spiral of the living white male surely ends here," John Leland wrote in Newsweek in 1993, as quoted in The New York Times. It was blamed for the death of two-year-old Jessica Matthews in Moraine, Ohio, in October 1993. Her five-year-old brother, Austin Messner, set fire to his mother's mobile home with a cigarette lighter, killing Jessica. The mother said her son watched an episode in which the characters said "fire was fun". However, many neighbors as well as an article in Rolling Stone reported that the family lived in poverty and were unlikely to have been able to afford cable TV, making the claim dubious. In 2008, Messner said that his family did not have cable at the time since it was unaffordable due to his mother's drug problem, and that he had never seen an episode of Beavis and Butt-Head, nor had he even heard of the show at the time or planned to watch an episode.

In response to this incident, all references to fire were removed from subsequent airings and the show was moved to the 11:00 p.m. time slot. The creators found a censorship loophole and took delight in sometimes making Beavis scream things that sounded very similar to his previous "Fire! Fire!" chant, such as in an episode when he says "Fryer! Fryer!" when he and Butt-Head are working the late shift at Burger World, and in some other episodes where he almost says the forbidden word (for example, in one episode, Beavis taunts Butt-Head by singing "Liar! Liar! Pants on...but pauses before he says "fire", and instead says "whoops"). In another episode, Butt-Head shows Beavis a music video where a man runs on fire in slow motion ("California" by Wax), which causes Beavis to become hypnotized by it and be hardly able to say the word. However, MTV eventually removed the episode entirely, leading it to be locked away in the MTV vault. References to fire were cut from earlier episodes—even the original master tapes were altered permanently. Other episodes MTV opted not to rerun included "Stewart's House" and "Way Down Mexico Way". Copies of early episodes with the controversial content intact are rare, and the copies that exist are made from home video recordings of the original broadcasts, typically on VHS. In an interview included with the Mike Judge Collection DVD set, Judge said he is uncertain whether some of the earlier episodes still exist in their original, uncensored form.

When the series returned in 2011, MTV allowed Beavis to use the word "fire" once again uncensored. During the first video segment, "Werewolves of Highland", the first new episode of the revival, Beavis utters the word "fire" a total of seven times within 28 seconds, with Butt-Head saying it once as well.

In February 1994, watchdog group Morality in Media claimed that the death of eight-month-old Natalia Rivera, struck by a bowling ball thrown from an overpass onto a highway in Jersey City, New Jersey, near the Holland Tunnel by 18-year-old Calvin J. Settle, was possibly inspired by Beavis and Butt-Head. The group said that Settle was influenced by the episode "Ball Breakers", in which Beavis and Butt-Head load a bowling ball with explosives and drop it from a rooftop. While Morality in Media claimed that the show inspired Settle's actions, the case's prosecutors did not. It was later revealed by both prosecutors and the defendant that Settle did not have cable TV, nor did he watch the show.

As a result of these controversies, MTV responded by broadcasting the program after 11:00 p.m. and included a disclaimer prior to the start of each show, which read:

Beavis and Butt-Head are not real. They are stupid cartoon people completely made up by this Texas guy whom we hardly even know. Beavis and Butt-Head are dumb, crude, thoughtless, ugly, sexist, self-destructive fools. But for some reason, the little wienerheads make us laugh.

However, due to being deemed too vague and not preventing the aforementioned dangers, the disclaimer was later changed to read:

Beavis and Butt-Head are not role models. They're not even human. They're cartoons. Some of the things they do would cause a person to get hurt, expelled, arrested, possibly deported. To put it another way: don't try this at home.

This disclaimer also appears before the opening of their Sega Genesis and Super NES games as well as their Windows game Beavis and Butt-Head in Virtual Stupidity.

In October 1993, during a US Senate Commerce, Science, and Transportation Committee hearing, Senator Fritz Hollings (D-SC) lambasted the titular characters as "Buffcoat and Beaver" when discussing the show's time slot shift. This subsequently became a running gag on the show where adults mispronounce their names. For example, one of the most recurring characters on the show, Tom Anderson, originally called them "Butthole" and "Joe", while believing the two of them to be of Asian ethnicity (describing them to the police as "Oriental"). In later episodes, Anderson calls the pair "Buffcoat and Beaver" as well and, on at least one occasion, refers to them as "Penis and Butt-Munch". President Clinton called them "Beavis and Bum-Head" in "Citizen Butt-Head", as well as in Do America, where an old lady (voiced by Cloris Leachman) consistently calls them "Travis" and "Bob-Head". In "Incognito", when another student threatens to kill them, the duo uses this to their advantage, pretending to be exchange students named "Crevis and Bung-Head". The bully, seeing through the disguises, calls them "Beaver and Butt-Plug". In "Right On!", when the duo appear on the Gus Baker Show, host Gus Baker (a caricature of Rush Limbaugh) introduces them as "Beavis and Buffcoat". In one episode, Principal McVickers, the principal of their high school, calls them "Beatrice and Butt-Brain", and in some other episodes, their teachers refer to them as "Beefus and Buffalo", "Beavis and Butter", and "Steven and Bernard", among other names. And in the original series finale, "Beavis and Butt-Head Are Dead", a news reporter refers to the two boys as "Brevis and Head-Butt". In the Season 9 episode "Locked Out", Tom Anderson mistakes Beavis and Butt-Head for honest and responsible boys, calling them "Buford and Bernardo" and blaming them for the alleged damage to the paint on his new truck, though Beavis and Butt-Head lied about the damage.

Beavis and Butt-Head have been compared to idiot savants because of their creative and subversively intelligent observations of music videos. This part of the show was mostly improvised by Mike Judge. With regard to criticisms of the two as "idiots", Judge responded that a show about straight-A students would not be funny.

== Films ==
There have been two Beavis and Butt-Head films that have been released: Beavis and Butt-Head Do America (1996) and Beavis and Butt-Head Do the Universe (2022). The two films have received largely positive reviews.

=== Beavis and Butt-Head Do America (1996) ===
The first theatrical adaptation, Beavis and Butt-Head Do America, is a comedy road-trip film that was released in the US on December 20, 1996. Its UK and European releases came later in 1997. Along with several of the series regulars, it also features the voices of Bruce Willis, Demi Moore, Cloris Leachman, Robert Stack, Eric Bogosian, Richard Linklater, Greg Kinnear (in an uncredited role) and David Letterman (credited as Earl Hofert). The film follows the duo's cross-country trip as accidental fugitives. The film was a commercial success, opening at number one at the US box office and grossed more than $60 million. It held the highest December opening gross of all time before being passed by Scream 2 a year later in 1997. It received positive reviews with critics complimenting the film's humor as "unexpectedly funny."

=== Beavis and Butt-Head Do the Universe (2022) ===
The second adaptation, Beavis and Butt-Head Do the Universe, is a sci-fi comedy film that was released as a Paramount+ exclusive on June 23, 2022. A Beavis and Butt-Head follow-up film was rumored long after Do America's release, but such a project never materialized. In February 2021, a sequel film was announced to be released on Paramount+ with an unspecified release date. A trailer was eventually released for the film on June 2, 2022, showcasing footage as well as the film's new subtitle; its release date was later that month on June 23. Work for the film was done remotely via zoom due to the COVID-19 pandemic. The film follows the titular duo as they get transported from 1998 to 2022 via space, coming into conflicts with their alternate-universe selves and the US government. The film received a highly positive reception from reviewers, who praised it as a "return to form" for the franchise. The film served as a lead-in to its Paramount+ revival.

== Related media ==
=== Home media ===
Episodes of Beavis and Butt-Head were released on VHS by MTV Video in the United States throughout the 1990s. Each tape is themed and the majority of the show's music video segments excised due to music licensing issues. The following releases were later released on LaserDisc in 1995 and on DVD through Time Life in 2002.

- There Goes the Neighborhood (February 7, 1995)
  - Contains: "Home Improvement", "Lawn and Garden", "Good Credit", "Washing the Dog", "Vs. the Vending Machine", "Mr. Anderson's Balls", "Pool Toys", "The Trial"
- Work Sucks (February 7, 1995)
  - Contains: "Burger World", "Customers Suck", "The Butt-Head Experience", "Be All You Can Be", "Cleaning House", "Sperm Bank", "Blackout!", "Closing Time"
- Chicks N' Stuff (December 1995)
  - Contains: "Friday Night", "Naked Colony", "1-900-BEAVIS", "Party", "Top O' The Mountain", "Plastic Surgin'", "Pregnant Pause", "Dream On"
- The Final Judgement (1995)
  - Contains: "No Laughing, " Scared Straight", "They're Coming To Take Me Away, Huh Huh", "Manners Suck", "Liar! Liar!", "The Great Cornholio", "The Final Judgement of Beavis"
- Beavis and Butt-Head Do Christmas (1996)
  - Contains: "Huh-Huh-Humbug", Letters to Santa Butt-Head Part I, Season's Greetings I, "It's a Miserable Life", Season's Greetings II, Letters to Santa Butt-Head Part II (missing letter from prison that was in aired version)
- Feel Our Pain (1996)
  - Contains: "Animation Sucks", "Bad Dog", "Tired", "Bus Trip", "Patsies", "Choke", "Blood Pressure", "Lightning Strikes"
- Law-Abiding Citizens (1997)
  - Contains: "Generation in Crisis", "Citizen Butt-Head", "Sexual Harassment", "Stewart Is Missing", Prank Call", "Feel A Cop", "Buy Beer", "Buttniks"
- Innocence Lost (1997)
  - Contains: "Held Back", "Safe Driving", "Figure Drawing", "Stewart Moves Away", "A Very Special Episode", "Nose Bleed", "Dumbasses Anonymous", "Vaya Con Cornholio"
- Troubled Youth (1998)
  - Contains: "Citizens Arrest", "Substitute, No Service", "Impotence", "Speech Therapy", "Work Is Death", "Die Fly, Die!", "Tainted Meat"
- Hard Cash (1998)
  - Contains: "Hard Sell", "Temporary Insanity", Music video: Rancid - "Nihilism", Buttbillies, Green Thumbs", Music video: Faith No More - "Diggin' the Grave", "Whiplash", Music video: MC 900 Ft. Jesus - "If I Only Had a Brain", "Inventors", "Yard Sale", Music video: Beastie Boys - "Pass the Mic", "Babysitting"
- Butt-O-Ween (1999)
  - Contains: "Bungholio: Lord of the Harvest", "The Pipe of Doom", "Killing Time", "Leave It to Beavis", "Ding Dong Ditch", "Late Night with Butt-Head", "Candy Sale"

Aside from the US, the UK and Australia received its own line of original home video releases from 1999 through 2002. In 2002, a DVD compilation entitled The History of Beavis and Butt-Head was pulled due to it not being approved by Mike Judge. However, some retailers erroneously put it out anyway, resulting in it becoming much sought-after item.

Three DVD volumes entitled Beavis and Butt-Head: The Mike Judge Collection were released in 2005 and 2006. Following the release of a fourth volume containing the show's entire eighth season revival series on DVD and Blu-ray in 2012, Beavis and Butt-Head: The Complete Collection was released in 2017. The set contains all previously released four volumes as well as the 1996 film, Beavis and Butt-Head Do America.

=== Merchandise ===
MTV marketed the program with a surplus of merchandise, with items as varied as clothing, hats, and aftershave. Judge found it difficult to extend his sensibility to the consumer products that bore his name; he noted that he had no involvement in the show's video games.

=== Comics ===
From 1994 to 1996, Beavis and Butt-Head received a monthly comic book series published by Marvel Comics under the Marvel Absurd imprint. A total of 28 issues were released, featuring work by various writers, with artwork for each issue by Rick Parker. The series was also reprinted by Marvel UK, which produced additional editorial material.

=== Daria ===
A spin-off based on classmate Daria Morgendorffer premiered in 1997. Mike Judge was not involved at all except to give permission for use of the character (created by Glenn Eichler and designed by Bill Peckmann). The only reference to the original show is Daria's mentioning that Lawndale cannot be a second Highland "unless there's uranium in the drinking water here too".

=== Video games ===
- MTV's Beavis and Butt-Head, a set of games released by Viacom New Media for the Game Gear, Genesis and Super NES in 1994. All three games featured music composed by Gwar.
- Talking MTV's Beavis and Butt-Head: This Game Rules!!!, a handheld LCD video game released by Tiger Electronics in 1994.
- Beavis and Butt-Head in Virtual Stupidity, a graphic adventure game released for Windows 95 in 1995. A PlayStation port was released exclusively in Japan in 1998 featuring dubbed voice acting by Atsushi Tamura and Ryō Tamura from Owarai duo London Boots Ichi-gō Ni-gō.
- Beavis and Butt-Head in Calling All Dorks, a collection of desktop themes for Windows 95 released in 1995 by Viacom New Media.
- Beavis and Butt-Head in Wiener Takes All, a Beavis and Butt-Head-themed trivia game by Viacom New Media. Released as a PC/Macintosh-compatible CD-ROM in 1996.
- Beavis and Butt-Head in Little Thingies, a mini-game collection released for Windows 95 in 1996 featuring four mini-games from the previously released Virtual Stupidity and three new ones.
- Beavis and Butt-Head, a coin-operated video game developed by Atari Games for a 3DO Interactive Multiplayer-based hardware. The game underwent location testing 1996, but was unreleased due to poor reception.
- Beavis and Butt-Head in Screen Wreckers, a collection of screensavers released for Windows 95 in 1997.
- Beavis and Butt-Head: Bunghole in One, a Beavis and Butt-Head-themed golf video game released for Windows 95 by GT Interactive in 1998.
- Beavis and Butt-Head, an overhead action game released by GT Interactive for the Game Boy in 1998.
- Beavis and Butt-Head Do Hollywood (originally titled Beavis and Butt-Head: Get Big in Hollywood), an unreleased 3D action game that was being produced by GT Interactive. It was announced for PlayStation in 1998. In January 2026, four prototypes of the game were recovered by game preservation community, Hidden Palace.
- Beavis and Butt-Head Do U., a graphic adventure game released by GT Interactive for Windows 95 in 1999.
- Call of Duty, the duo (as well as Coach Buzzcut and Todd Ianuzzi) are available as Call of Duty skins that can be used in both Black Ops 6 and Warzone multiplayer matches in the 2025 Season 4 Reloaded update.
- Fortnite, the duo are also available as Fortnite outfits, with both launching on Chapter 6 Season 4 in September 2025.

=== Books ===
- Brown, Kristofor (1997). Stern, Dave (ed.). MTV'S Beavis and Butt-Head: Travel Log. MTV Books, Pocket Books. ISBN 0-671-01533-8.
- Brown, Kristofor (1997). MTV'S Beavis and Butt-Head: Big Book of Important Stuff to Make Life Cool. Boston America Corp. ISBN 1-889647-15-2.
- Doyle, Larry (1995). Eichler, Glenn (ed.). MTV'S Beavis and Butt-Head: This Sucks, Change It!. MTV Books, Pocket Books, Melcher Media. ISBN 0-671-53633-8.
- Doyle, Larry (1996). Eichler, Glenn (ed.). MTV'S Beavis and Butt-Head: Huh Huh For Hollywood. MTV Books, Pocket Books. ISBN 0-671-00655-X.
- Grabianski, Greg; Keillor, Aimee (1997). Brown, Kristofor (ed.). MTV'S Beavis and Butt-Head: The Butt-Files. MTV Books, Pocket Books. ISBN 0-671-01426-9.
- Johnson, Sam; Marcil, Chris (1993). Eichler, Glenn (ed.). MTV'S Beavis and Butt-Head: This Book Sucks. MTV Books, Callaway, Pocket Books. ISBN 0-671-89034-4.
- Johnson, Sam; Marcil, Chris; Maxtone-Graham, Guy; Brown, Kristofor; Felton, David; Eichler, Glenn; Judge, Mike (1994). Eichler, Glenn (ed.). MTV'S Beavis and Butt-Head: Ensucklopedia. MTV Books, Pocket Books. ISBN 0-671-52149-7.
- Judge, Mike; Stillman, Joe (1997). MTV'S Beavis and Butt-Head Do America: The Official Script Book. MTV Books, Pocket Books. ISBN 0-671-00658-4.
- Rheingold, Andy; Sonneborn, Scott (1998). Brown, Kristofor (ed.). MTV'S Beavis and Butt-Head: Chicken Soup for the Butt. MTV Books, Pocket Books. ISBN 0-671-02598-8.
- Brown, Kristofor, ed. (1996). MTV'S Beavis and Butt-Head: Doodle (doodie) Book. Boston America Corp. ISBN 1-889647-00-4.
- MTV's Beavis and Butt-Head: 3-D Poster Book. Boston America Corp. 1997.
- MTV's Beavis and Butt-Head: Doodle (doodie) Book #2. Boston America Corp. 1997. ISBN 1-889647-28-4.
- MTV's Beavis and Butt-Head: Sticky Things. Boston America Corp. 1997. ISBN 1-889647-16-0.
- Reading Sucks: The Collected Works of Beavis and Butt-Head. MTV. 2005. ISBN 978-1-4165-2436-6. (NOTE: This book is a bundle of four previous books 'Ensucklopedia,' 'Huh Huh for Hollywood,' 'The Butt-Files,' and 'Chicken Soup for the Butt' which are no longer in print separately).

=== Music ===
An album inspired by the series, The Beavis and Butt-Head Experience, was released on Geffen Records. The label's namesake, David Geffen, came up with the concept for the album. He was sold on the show's success upon its debut, and contacted MTV to make a deal to co-finance the album and later film. The album features many hard rock and heavy metal bands such as Megadeth, Primus, Nirvana and White Zombie. Moreover, Beavis and Butt-Head do a duet with Cher on "I Got You Babe" and a track by themselves called "Come to Butt-Head". The track with Cher also resulted in a music video directed by Tamra Davis and Yvette Kaplan. It sold over two million copies worldwide.

In 2015, the pair were featured in commissioned skits on the album Speedin' Bullet 2 Heaven by Kid Cudi.

==== Chart success ====
Beavis and Butt-Head duet with Cher UK single which includes a Beavis and Butt-Head Experience sticker to promote the release

The Beavis and Butt-Head duet with Cher on "I Got You Babe" was released as a single in the UK, Australia, Europe and the US, the UK CD had a special limited edition sticker to promote The Beavis and Butt-Head Experience available with the release. On January 15, 1994, the song charted at number 35 in the UK charts and stayed on the charts for 4 weeks. On December 4, 1993, the song charted on the Billboard Bubbling Under Hot 100 chart in the US peaking at number 8.

The single also charted at number 69 in Australia, 19 in Belgium, 18 in Denmark, 69 on the European Hot 100, 9 on the Netherlands Dutch Top 40, 10 on the Netherlands top 100 and number 40 in Sweden.

=== Slot game ===
In 2019, Gauselmann Group's UK-based games studio Blueprint Gaming launched the Beavis and Butt-Head online slot game. The game features moments and scenes from the TV show and film.

The branded game was among the 10 most exposed slot games in UK online casinos days after its release in late May 2019.
