= The Illusions Gaming Company =

American video game developer

- Industry: Video games
- Founded: 1993; 32 years ago
- Founders: Darren Bartlett; James Coliz

The Illusions Gaming Company was a video game developer best known for producing point-and-click adventure games based on several licensed properties. The company was founded in 1993 by two former Virgin Interactive employees, Darren Bartlett and James Coliz.

== Games ==
- Super Caesars Palace – Super NES, Sega Genesis, Game Gear (1993)
- Scooby-Doo Mystery – Sega Genesis (1995)
- Blazing Dragons – PlayStation, Sega Saturn (1996)
- Duckman: The Graphic Adventures of a Private Dick – Windows, Classic Mac OS, PlayStation (1997)
- Beavis and Butt-Head: Bunghole in One – Windows (1998)
- Beavis and Butt-Head Do U. – Windows (1999)
