= Beavis and Butt-Head Do U. =

1999 video game

Beavis & Butt-head Do U.
- Windows cover art
- Developer: Illusions Gaming Company
- Publisher: GT Interactive
- Director: Darren Bartlett
- Producers: James Coliz Jr. Nathan Rose
- Designer: Ryan Modjeski
- Programmers: Bill Fowler; Chuck Woo
- Writer: Bo Weinberg
- Platform: Microsoft Windows
- Release: NA: March 7, 1999; EU: 1999
- Genre: Point-and-click adventure
- Mode: Single-player

Beavis and Butt-Head Do U. is a point-and-click adventure game developed by the Illusions Gaming Company and published by GT Interactive. Based on the American animated sitcom of the same name, it was released in 1999 and serves as a follow-up to Beavis and Butt-Head in Virtual Stupidity.

== Gameplay ==
In Beavis and Butt-Head Do U., the game plays as a point-and-click adventure game. The player directs Beavis and Butt-Head, who primarily wander around the campus of Highland State College during a class field trip, and aim to gather signatures from eight staff members in order to attend a party at the end of the day. Beavis and Butt-Head explore different locations, which each have unique conditions that can be utilized to complete their underlying goal. Sub-quests are made as they wander around and interact with the storyline. Items can be picked up, which can be found after interaction.

== Plot ==
Beavis and Butt-Head head out with the class on a field trip to Highland State College. They're assigned to gather the signatures of eight staff members to prove they spent the day learning about the benefits of a Highland State education. Beavis and Butt-Head become self-motivated to explore the campus at their own pace, mesmerized about the idea of interacting with "college sluts".

Success will be rewarded by being allowed to attend a party at the end of the day.

== Development ==
In 1997 GT Interactive acquired the rights to publish video games based on Beavis and Butt-Head.

== Critical reception ==
Reception

Aggregate score
Aggregator	Score
GameRankings	56%

Review scores
Publication	Score
Adventure Gamers	1.5/5
AllGame	3/5
Computer Games Strategy Plus	1.5/5
GameSpot	5.4/10
GameStar	54%
IGN	5.6/10
PC Accelerator	6/10
PC PowerPlay	68%
PC Zone	79%

The game received mixed reviews according to the review aggregation website GameRankings. GameSpot said, "Casual Beavis and Butt-Head fans might be satisfied with hearing their favorite cartoon characters say the same old stuff in a brand-new place, but discerning fans – and gamers looking for their money's worth in an adventure game – will likely walk away from this one feeling a little bit cheated." Adventure Gamers criticized the game's "short gameplay with mostly elementary puzzles", and concluded: "Only for fans of the series, other gamers will find it heavy handed and superficial." Computer Games Magazine was more critical of Beavis and Butt-Head Do U., citing underwhelming execution of the gameplay and plot when compared to the television series, specifically pointing out the lack of innovation in regards to the stupidity of the titular characters.
