= Blazing Dragons (video game) =

1996 video game

- North American PlayStation cover art
- Developer: Illusions Gaming Company
- Publisher: Crystal Dynamics
- Director: Darren Bartlett
- Producer: Matthew Seymour
- Designers: Matthew Seymour; Frederick J. Schiller; Russell Lingo
- Programmers: Matt Gilbert; Chuck Woo
- Artists: Yoriko Ito; Russell Lingo
- Writer: Frederick J. Schiller
- Composer: John Lawrence
- Series: Blazing Dragons
- Platforms: PlayStation, Sega Saturn
- Release: NA: October 3, 1996; UK: November 15, 1996
- Genre: Point-and-click adventure
- Mode: Single-player

Blazing Dragons is a 1996 point-and-click adventure game developed by the Illusions Gaming Company and published by Crystal Dynamics for the PlayStation and Sega Saturn. It is adapted from the television series of the same name, based on the legend of King Arthur, with the player controlling an anthropomorphic dragon named Flicker. He is in love with Princess Flame, but is not eligible to ask for her hand in marriage because he is not a knight and must pass a trial hosted by the King to become one. The writing and humor in the game is heavily influenced by Monty Python, with Terry Jones serving as one of the game's many voice actors.

== Synopsis ==
As Flicker, the player must collect various objects and interact with a cast of dragon and human characters in order to solve puzzles. As is the case with many other graphic adventure games, the player can never reach a game over or otherwise reach a point where a puzzle can not be solved. The player's overall quest is to become a dragon knight to compete in the grand tournament and win the heart of Princess Flame. However, the player discovers an evil human plot to take over the kingdom by kidnapping the princess.

== Plot ==
The evil Sir George and his magician companion Mervin are plotting to conquer the kingdom of Camelhot and exterminate the native dragons. After Sir George's failed siege against Camelhot, he declares his ally, the Black Dragon to win an upcoming dragon tournament the winner of whom shall be married to Flame and become the new king. A young inventor named Flicker wishes to marry King All-Fire's daughter Flame, but he is rejected due to lack of knighthood. While rescuing King All-Fire's knights from their investigation of Black Dragon, he finds this Black Dragon is a mechanical dragon, then sabotages it. Sir Loungealot takes Flicker as a squire, but takes credit for Flicker's victory on the Black Dragon, prompting Flame to leave the castle, only to be kidnapped by Sir George and Mervin. The King's Chancellor is secretly working for Sir George and steals Flicker's invention so Sir George can build a more powerful Black Dragon II. To prevent the King from noticing Flame's absence, Flicker has the court jester Trivet impersonate her.

Flicker infiltrates Castle Grim disguised as Sir George, releases Flame and gets the Black Dragon II destroyed. By the time Flicker returns to Camelhot, his deception is exposed and Flicker has to rescue the King's knights to earn his respect. The next day, Flicker proves his worth at the Cave of Dilemma gaining his knighthood in time for the dragon tournament. Flicker makes it to the final, defeating Sir Loungealot, but then Sir George and Mervin invade with a newer Black Dragon. Flicker destroys the mechanical Black Dragon once again. Mervin accidentally causes Sir George to fuse with the Black Dragon, transforming into the Black Dragon III. Sir George swallows Flicker, Mervin and King All-Fire, but Flicker cuts off the machine's power supply, causing the machine to be destroyed, reverting Sir George back to his human form and the machine lands on the Chancellor. King All-Fire asks Flicker to marry his daughter as he secretly always wanted him to, before he gained knighthood. Flicker happily accepts the request.

== Development ==
The game was first announced under the title "Dragons of the Square Table" in 1995 and was originally slated for release later that year. It was later redesigned to be based on the Canadian television series of the same name, and was released for the PlayStation and Sega Saturn consoles in late 1996. The game's writing and humor is heavily influenced by Monty Python, with Terry Jones serving as one of the game's voice actors. Others include Cheech Marin, Harry Shearer, Jim Cummings, Jeff Bennett, Kath Soucie, B. J. Ward, Roger Rose, Michael Bell, Brian George, Rob Paulsen, Robert Ridgely, Jess Harnell, Gregg Berger, and Charlie Adler.

== Reception ==
Reception

Review scores
Publication	Score
AllGame	3/5
Computer and Video Games	2/5
Electronic Gaming Monthly	8/10
GameSpot	6.6/10; 5.6/10
Next Generation	2/5
Sega Saturn Magazine	23%

Electronic Gaming Monthly's gave the PlayStation version an 8 out of 10, praising the "side-splitting" humor, and the challenging puzzles, while commenting that the built-in hint feature opens the game up to players of all skill levels. GamePro's Scary Larry commented positively on the animation and the voice acting's exaggerated accents, but found the puzzles too difficult and said the game is too similar to Discworld to appeal to anyone who did not enjoy that game. Next Generation reviewed it roughly six months later, with the reviewer remarking that "for the most part the game is enjoyable." He particularly praised Cheech Marin and Harry Shearer's acting, and said that though the frequent load times make it out-of-place on consoles, it is virtually the only option available on consoles for enthusiasts of graphic adventure games.

Reviewing the Saturn version, GameSpot commented, "It's not particularly impressive in any respect, but the game is fun, with a lot of fairly obscure puzzles to solve, oddball characters to meet, and plenty of bad jokes to go around." Rob Allsetter of Sega Saturn Magazine panned the game, saying the humor, plot, interface, graphics, and voice acting were "awful".
