= Super Casino 2 =

1994 video game

- Cover art
- Developer(s): Coconuts Japan
- Publisher(s): Coconuts Japan
- Designer(s): Naomi Watanabe; Kaori Niitsu
- Composer(s): Masahito Miyamoto
- Series: Super Casino
- Platform(s): Super NES
- Release: JP: October 28, 1994
- Genre(s): Casino
- Mode(s): Single-player

Super Casino 2 (スーパーカジノ2) is a Super Nintendo Entertainment System video game that takes a player to an exclusive black tie casino known as the Casino Coconuts.

Various betting games are available like blackjack, baccarat, slot machines, roulette, and wagering bets on the horses. The game is the sequel to Super Casino - Caesars Palace (Super Caesars Palace in North America). All text in the game is in Japanese.

== Gameplay ==
The story mode tells the tale about this gambler who comes to the casino with $1000 where he meets the casino's cashier. She exchanges his hard currency for gambling chips and the game begins. As the gambler, the player must make a certain amount of money in order to progressively gain access to the high roller rooms. These additional rooms are where casino patrons are permitted to wager more money.

At first, the player is limited to the section of the casino with the lowest maximum bets. As the player meets his monetary obligations through winning casino games, the player is transferred from room to room. Each room has its floor in different colors like royal blue and red. As the player moves up to a higher level floor, the maximum bets for the individual games found will increase. Slot machines that once had a denomination of $1 and $5 will become slot machines with denominations of $100 and $1000 as the player accumulates more money in his virtual wallet. A cashier can provide the player with passwords that will allow him to continue to game at a later date. Rooms eventually connect to each other after gaining a certain amount of money; allowing players with bad luck to rebuild their fortunes at the lower-risk games.

Having $200,000 in cash results in the player being permitted to access the VIP room. After winning one million dollars, the game ends with the closing credits with the exterior of the casino as a background. Some jazzy music will play in the background. Going broke will result in an immediate "game over."

== Reception ==
On release, Famicom Tsūshin scored the game a 21 out of 40.
