= Merkur Group =

German gaming and gambling company

Coordinates: 52.37355°N 8.630987°E

- Native name: Merkur.com AG
- Type: Various, including AG and GmbH
- Industry: Gambling, Slot machines, Online gaming, sports betting
- Founded: 1957
- Founder: Paul Gauselmann
- Headquarters: Espelkamp and Lübbecke, Germany
- Area served: Europe
- Key people: Lars Felderhoff (Chairman; Finance & Administration); Manfred Stoffers (Vice Chairman; Communication, Public & Legal Affairs); Dominik Raasch (Merkur Games); Meik Sellenriek (Merkur Operations); David Schnabel (Merkur Casinos); Michael Gauselmann (Chairman of the Supervisory Board); Jürgen Stühmeyer and Stefan Meyer (members of the Supervisory Board)
- Revenue: €2.103 billion (2025)
- Number of employees: 15,254 (2025)
- Subsidiaries: Praesepe; Cashino
- Website: merkur.group; merkur.com

Gauselmann Family Foundation
- Formation: 21 December 2015
- Founder: Paul Gauselmann and family
- Headquarters: Espelkamp, Germany
- Chair: Michael Gauselmann
- Key people: Manfred Stoffers (deputy chair); Jürgen Stühmeyer (member); Janika Gauselmann (member)
- Website: Auszug des Stiftungsregisters NRW

Merkur Group (officially Merkur.com AG, until 2023 known as Gauselmann Group) is a family-owned, internationally operating business group in the entertainment and leisure industry, founded in 1957 by Paul Gauselmann. The company, based in Espelkamp and Lübbecke, develops, manufactures and distributes slot machines, operates a chain of amusement arcades, and is also active in sports betting, online gaming, financial services and casinos.

== History ==
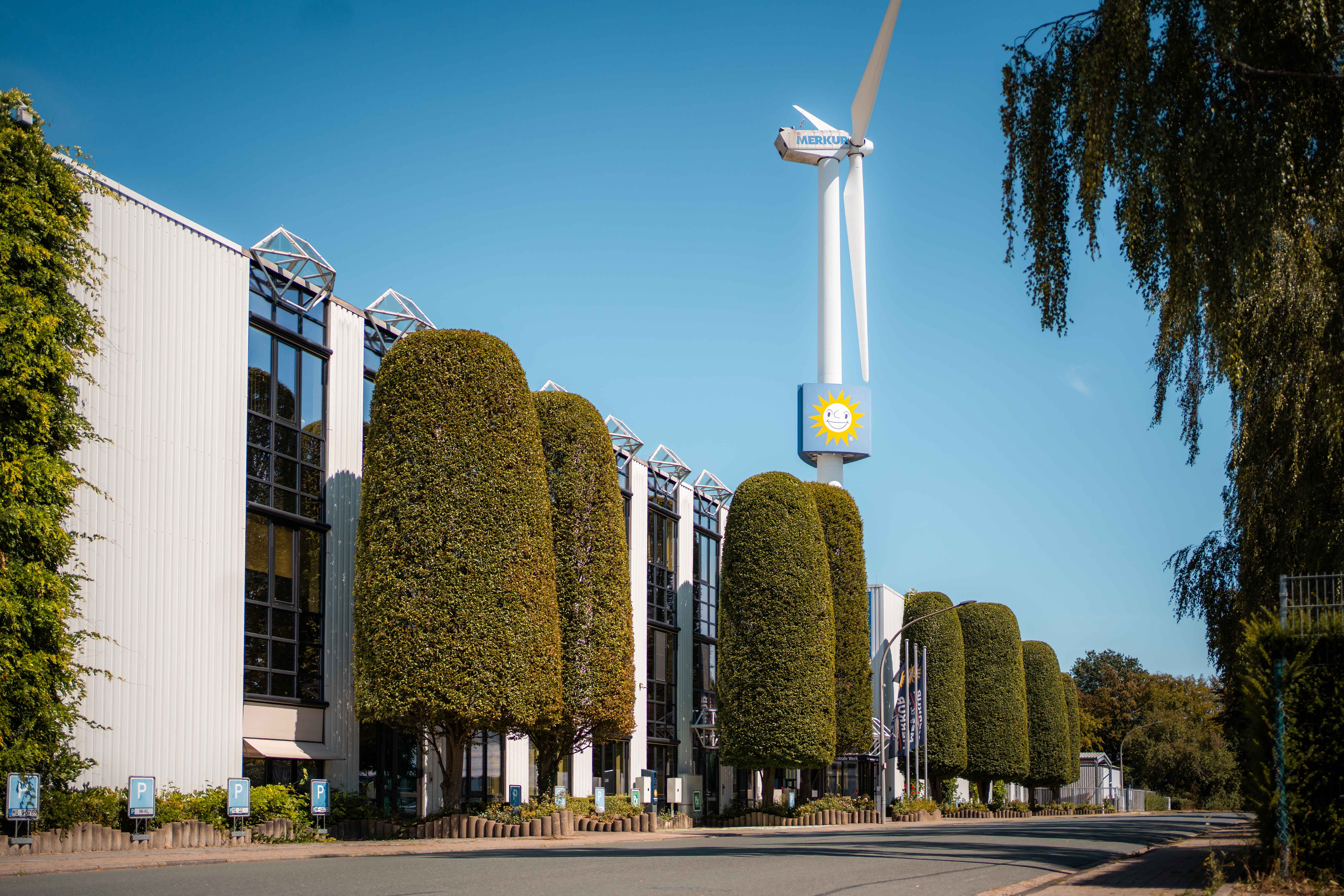
Merkur headquarters in Lübbecke

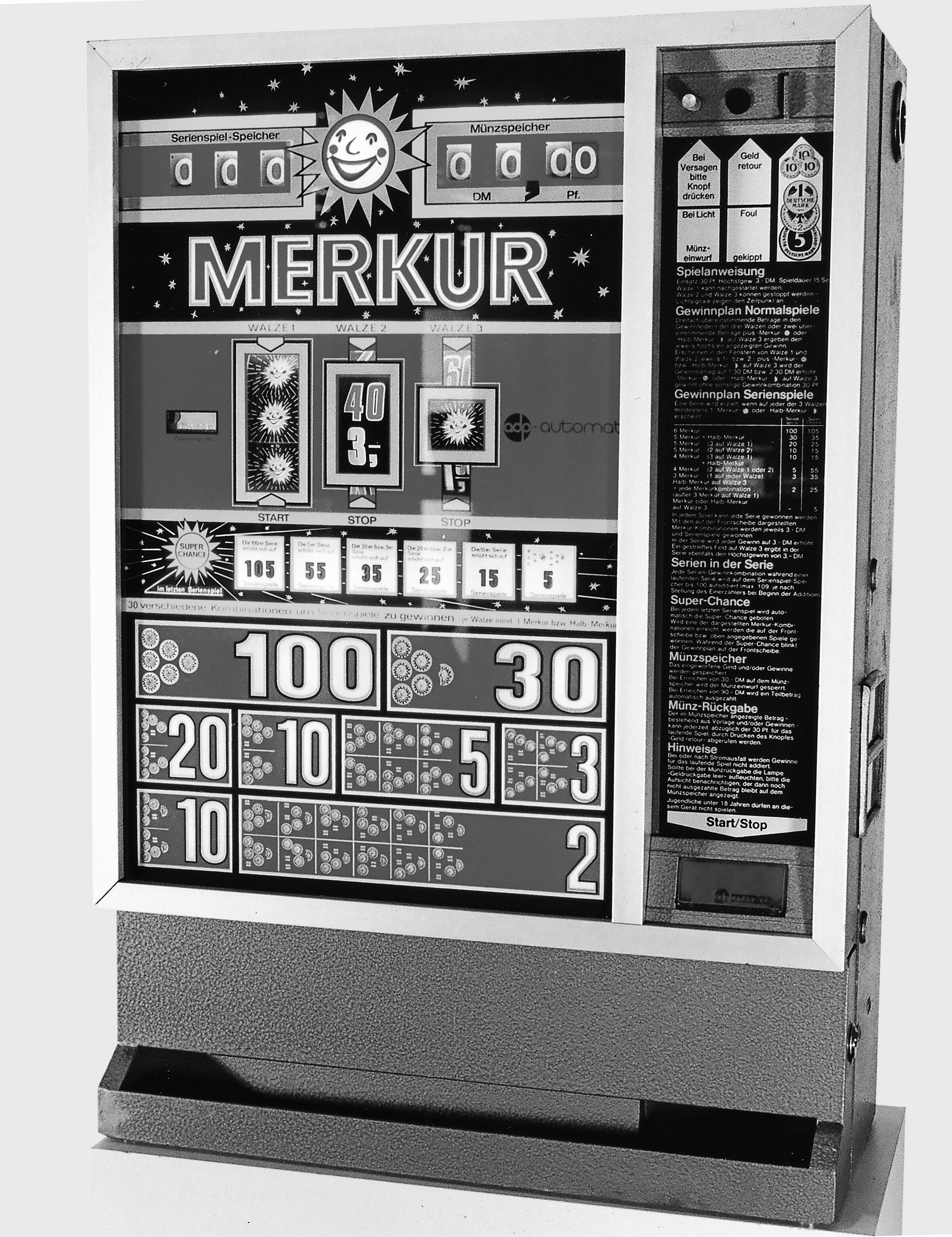
The Merkur B was Paul Gauselmann's first self-developed amusement-with-prizes machine. It was launched in 1977. He chose the name Merkur because 1977 was the year of Mercury, the god of merchants and traders.

The telecommunications inspector Paul Gauselmann began working as an importer of amusement machines in Coesfeld in 1956. He later obtained a position in the development department of Harting in Espelkamp. There, Gauselmann designed electronic music and cigarette vending machines and became head of the development department for vending machines in 1960.

Gauselmann's hobby, the development of jukeboxes, became a business in 1957, which he pursued alongside his main work at Harting. In 1958, Willi Gauselmann joined the business, followed by Eugen Gauselmann in 1962. The company subsequently operated under the name Gebrüder Gauselmann. In 1964, Paul Gauselmann left his work at Harting and worked only for his own company, which by then already had 15 employees. The business model was the installation of jukeboxes imported from the United States in restaurants and pubs.

In 1970, Gauselmann founded Gauselmann Großhandel, which distributed machines made by third-party manufacturers. After a machine manufacturer imposed a supply boycott in 1972, Gauselmann decided to develop his own gaming machines together with Friedel Horstmann. In 1972, Gauselmann founded adp Gauselmann GmbH and began developing his own gaming machine. In 1974, Gauselmann opened the first amusement arcade under the name Casino Merkur-Spielothek in Delmenhorst. Since then, the company has operated 800 amusement arcades under the Merkur brand.

In December 1976, the Physikalisch-Technische Bundesanstalt approved Gauselmann's first gaming machine, which was distributed from 1977 under the name Merkur B. The companies of the then Gauselmann Group were combined in 1980 in what was then the holding company Gauselmann AG. In 1985, the company recorded a 19% increase in revenue to 560 million Deutsche Mark, generated by 2,250 employees. Since 1986, Gauselmann has operated outside Germany under the Merkur brand. In the same year, the then Gauselmann Group generated nationwide revenue of 650 million Deutsche Mark and had more than 3,250 full-time employees and 69 trainees.

After German reunification, the then Gauselmann Group recorded an increase in revenue. In 1991, annual revenue exceeded one billion Deutsche Mark for the first time. In 1999, the Paul and Karin Gauselmann Foundation was established as a supporter of social and cultural projects. In 2005, Merkur Gaming GmbH was created, taking over the development and distribution of amusement-with-prizes machines within the Gauselmann Group. The business was organisationally integrated into adp Gauselmann GmbH in 2015, while the Merkur brand name was retained.

In autumn 2012, it acquired the British company Praesepe, headed by Nick Harding.

In 2013, Gauselmann entered the casino sector with casinos in Saxony-Anhalt. In 2016, Gauselmann received approval to operate casinos on cruise ships operated by TUI Cruises. By 2017, Gauselmann had produced more than two million Merkur-brand gaming machines.

In 2020, Gauselmann became the majority shareholder of the online betting provider Bede Gaming.

In July 2021, the Merkur Group acquired the four WestSpiel casinos owned by the state of North Rhine-Westphalia. A fifth venue was established shortly thereafter in Monheim, between Cologne and Düsseldorf.

As part of the digitalisation and internationalisation of the corporate group, the Gauselmann Group first renamed adp Gauselmann GmbH as adp Merkur GmbH in 2022 and, at the beginning of 2024, renamed Gauselmann AG as Merkur.com AG and the Gauselmann Group as the Merkur Group.

On 27 April 2022, the company opened Germany's first licensed online amusement arcades, JackpotPiraten and BingBong, through its subsidiary DGGS Deutsche Gesellschaft für Glücksspiel mbH, on the basis of a licence under the 2021 Interstate Treaty on Gambling (GlüStV 2021). Merkur Slots, Merkur Bets and Slotmagie are additional licensed offerings for the German market.

On 1 October 2024, company founder Paul Gauselmann retired. Lars Felderhoff, who had previously been responsible for finance, real estate and human resources, succeeded him as spokesman of the executive board. Gauselmann′s son Michael took over the chairmanship of the supervisory board and the foundation.

On 1 July 2025, the Merkur Group took over the casinos in Lower Saxony from Casino Austria International. In September 2025, the Merkur Group acquired the American software games company Gaming Arts.

On 27 August 2026, Merkur Spielbanken Beteiligungs GmbH, a subsidiary of Merkur.com AG, entered into a put option agreement to acquire a 95% stake in Casigrangi, the holding company of the French casino group Le Stelsia, from GPG Groupe Philippe Ginestet and DOFA; the agreement was announced the following day. Casigrangi operates seven small and medium-sized casinos: those of Megève, Granville and Mimizan directly, and, indirectly through the listed operator Société Française de Casinos (SFC), those of Gruissan, Port-la-Nouvelle, Collioure and Châtel-Guyon. Casigrangi holds 4,135,434 SFC shares, representing about 81.21% of the company's capital and voting rights. The price agreed with the sellers implies a valuation of €6.19 per SFC share, 157.9% above the closing price of 27 August 2026 and 195.9% above the volume-weighted average price of the previous 240 trading sessions. Merkur would then be required to file a simplified tender offer for the remaining SFC shares with the Autorité des marchés financiers at the same price, and stated its intention to seek a squeeze-out and to delist the company. Completion is targeted for the first quarter of 2027 and remains subject to employee consultation and to regulatory approvals, including that of the French Ministry of the Interior. The transaction was the third consolidation move in the French casino market in fourteen months, after Novomatic's acquisition of Vikings Casinos in 2025 and Banijay Gaming's agreement in July 2026 to buy the 33-venue JOA group.

== Corporate group ==
Since 2016, the corporate group has been held by a family foundation of the former owner family, the Gauselmann family. The founder of the corporate group is Paul Gauselmann, who was the spokesman of the executive board of the Aktiengesellschaft until October 2024. The brand name used by several companies in the group is Merkur. It was first used in 1977 for the Merkur B gaming machine.

As of 31 December 2023, the Merkur Group held interests in 241 companies. Slightly more than half of the companies in the Merkur Group are headquartered in Germany.

The revenue of the entire Merkur Group for the 2025 financial year was €2.10 billion. At the end of the 2025 financial year, the Merkur Group employed 15,254 people worldwide.

== Sponsorship ==
The Merkur Group acts as a sponsor throughout Germany. It holds, for example, the naming rights to the Merkur Spiel-Arena, where Fortuna Düsseldorf plays its home matches, and supports several clubs in German professional football, including RB Leipzig, DSC Arminia Bielefeld, and FC Schalke 04. Outside sport, the Merkur Group is a partner of festivals in Germany, including Parookaville. In March 2026, it became known that, from April 2026, the Merkur Group would sponsor the Merkur Ostseehalle in Kiel for ten years.
