= Beavis and Butt-Head: Bunghole in One =

1998 video game

- Developer: Illusions Gaming Company
- Publisher: GT Interactive
- Platform: Microsoft Windows
- Release: NA: December 23, 1998
- Genre: Sports
- Modes: Single-player, multiplayer

Beavis and Butt-Head: Bunghole in One is a 1998 sports video game developed by Illusions Gaming Company and published by GT Interactive for Microsoft Windows computer operating systems. Based on the animated television series Beavis and Butt-Head, it sees the player playing rounds of miniature golf on themed courses as characters from the show.

Upon its release, the game received negative reception from critics.

== Reception ==
Reception

Aggregate score
| Aggregator | Score |
|---|---|
| GameRankings | 39% |

Review scores
| Publication | Score |
|---|---|
| Computer and Video Games | 1/5 |
| GamePro | 3/5 |
| GameRevolution | D |
| GameSpot | 4.3/10 |
| IGN | 4.4/10 |
| PC Accelerator | 4/10 |
| PC Gamer (US) | 53% |
| PC PowerPlay | 68% |
| PC Zone | 49% |

The game received unfavorable reviews according to the review aggregation website GameRankings.
