= Merkur Spiel-Arena =

Stadium in the city of Düsseldorf, North Rhine-Westphalia, Germany

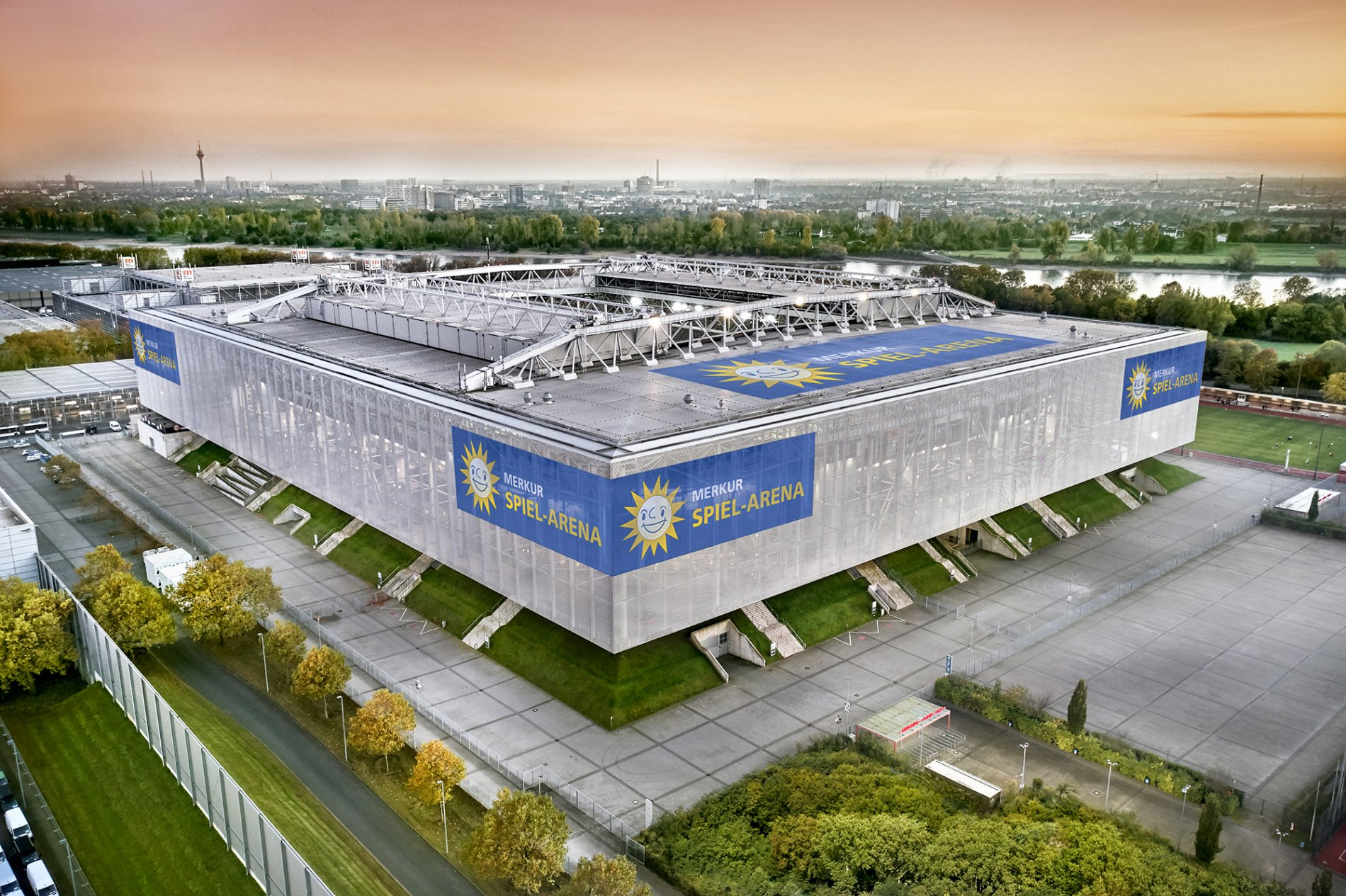
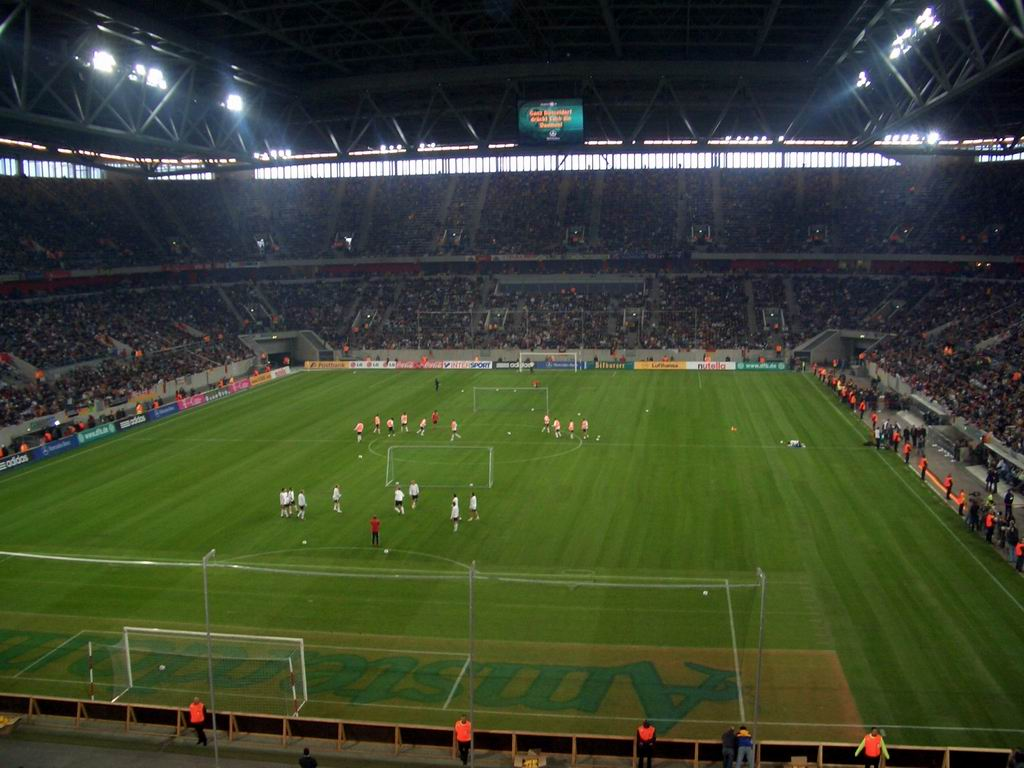
- Exterior view of Merkur Spiel-Arena
- Interactive map of Merkur Spiel-Arena
- Former names: LTU Arena (2004–2009); Esprit Arena (2009–2018)
- Location: Düsseldorf, Germany
- Coordinates: 51°15′42″N 6°43′59″E
- Owner: City of Düsseldorf
- Capacity: 54,600 (9,917 standing); 66,500 (concerts)
- Executive suites: 27; 8 (event suites)
- Roof: Retractable
- Field size: 100 m × 70 m (330 ft × 230 ft)

Construction
- Built: 2002–2004
- Opened: 10 September 2004
- Cost: €240 million
- Architect: JSK Architekten

Tenants
- Fortuna Düsseldorf (2004–present); Rhein Fire (2005–2007); Bayer Leverkusen (2008–2009); KFC Uerdingen (2019–2020); Germany national football team (selected matches)

Website
- merkur-spiel-arena.de

Merkur Spiel-Arena (stylized in all caps), previously known as the Esprit Arena (until 2 August 2018), the LTU Arena (until June 2009), and also called the Düsseldorf Arena (during the 2011 Eurovision Song Contest and the UEFA Euro 2024), is a retractable roof football stadium in Düsseldorf, Germany. The arena currently hosts association football team Fortuna Düsseldorf.

== History ==
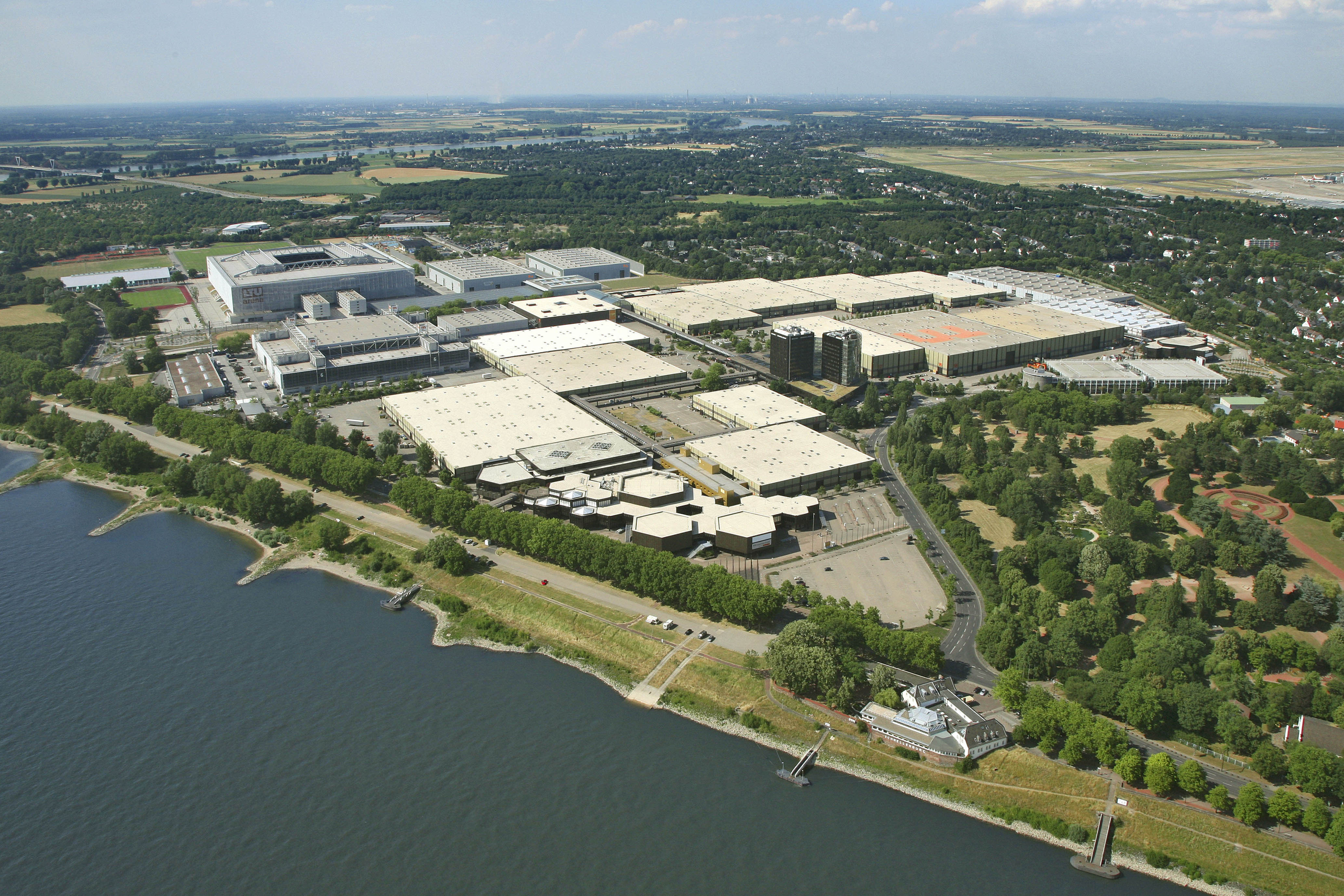
Aerial view of Messe Düsseldorf in District 5, including the Arena on the far left

Construction of the stadium began in 2002 and was completed in 2004. It was built to replace the former Rheinstadion at the same site near the river Rhine.

The structure's initial seating capacity of 51,500 was expanded in summer 2010 when some seating areas were converted into standing terraces, and it currently holds 54,600.

The stadium has a retractable roof, as well as a heating system making it possible to comfortably host events throughout the year.

== Sports events ==
=== International football matches ===
While the stadium was not one of the venues for the 2006 FIFA World Cup in Germany, it has hosted several international matches since it opened.

The first international match at the stadium was an international friendly between Germany and Argentina on 9 February 2005, ending in a 2–2 draw. On 7 February 2007, Germany played their second international friendly in the Arena, beating Switzerland 3–1. On 11 February 2009, Germany suffered a 1–0 defeat to Norway.

Portugal also played two international friendlies at the stadium. On 1 March 2006, Portugal recorded a 3–0 win over Saudi Arabia. On 26 March 2008, Portugal played their second international friendly at the stadium, suffering a 2–1 defeat to Greece.

In September 2022, the venue hosted a friendly between the United States and Japan.

=== UEFA Euro 2024 ===
The stadium was one of the venues for the UEFA Euro 2024. However, due to sponsorship contracts, the arena was called "Düsseldorf Arena" during the tournament.

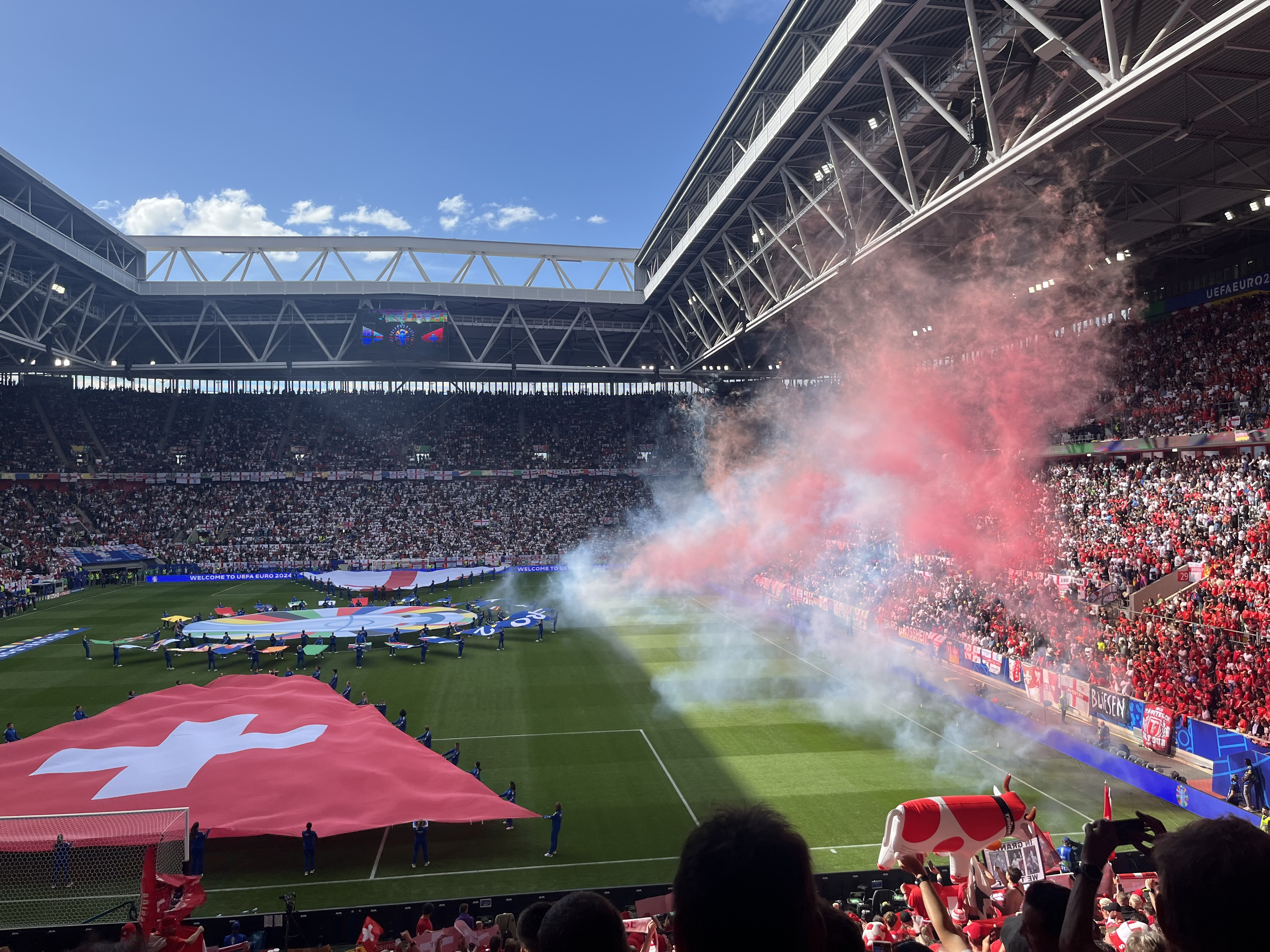
The Düsseldorf stadium during Euro 2024.

The following matches were played at the stadium:

| Date | Time (CEST) | Team #1 | Result | Team #2 | Round | Spectators |
|---|---|---|---|---|---|---|
| 17 June 2024 | 21:00 | Austria | 0–1 | France | Group D | 46,425 |
| 21 June 2024 | 15:00 | Slovakia | 1–2 | Ukraine | Group E | 43,910 |
| 24 June 2024 | 21:00 | Albania | 0–1 | Spain | Group B | 46,586 |
| 1 July 2024 | 18:00 | France | 1–0 | Belgium | Round of 16 | 46,810 |
| 6 July 2024 | 18:00 | England | 1–1 (5–3 pen.) | Switzerland | Quarter-finals | 46,907 |

=== Other sports events ===
The stadium was the former home of the Rhein Fire of NFL Europe, an American football league. They were tenants for their final three seasons from 2005 to 2007. The stadium hosted World Bowl XIII and XIV. Esprit Arena hosted the Race of Champions 2010, with notable drivers such as Michael Schumacher, Sebastian Vettel, Alain Prost and Sébastien Loeb.

The Esprit Arena was the host venue for boxing world heavyweight championship bouts: between Wladimir Klitschko and Eddie Chambers on 20 March 2010 (Klitschko won the bout by KO in the 12th round), Wladimir Klitschko against Jean-Marc Mormeck on 3 March 2012 (Klitschko won by KO in the 4th round), Wladimir Klitschko against Tyson Fury on 28 November 2015 (see Wladimir Klitschko vs. Tyson Fury (Fury won by a unanimous points decision).

In 2021, the stadium hosted the Championship Game auf the inaugural season of the European League of Football.

On January 10, 2024, the arena set a world record for hosting the biggest audience of a handball game with 53,586 spectators watching the game between Germany vs. Switzerland at the European Men's Handball Championship.

== Music events ==
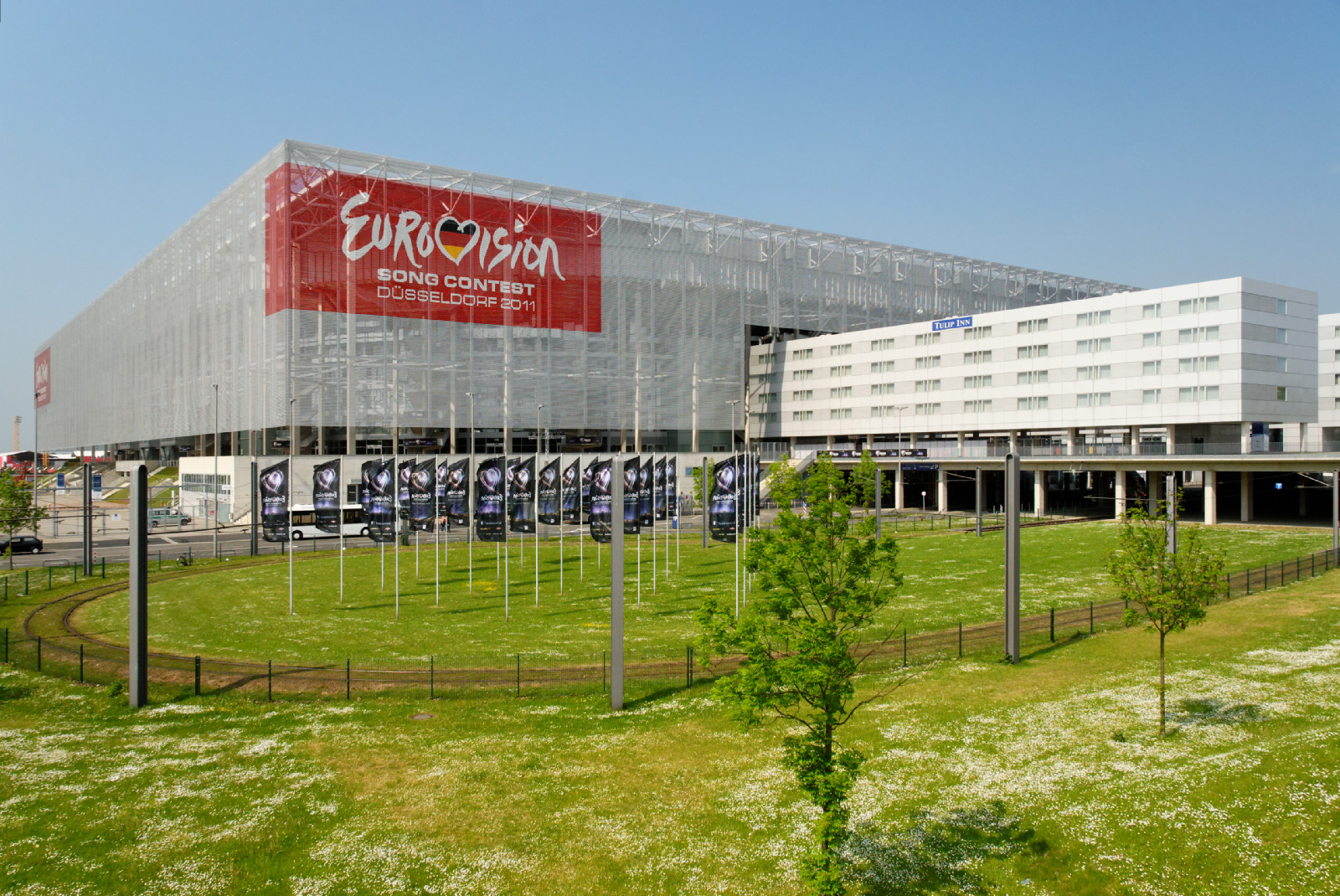
Esprit Arena with Eurovision Song Contest 2011 wrapping

List of concerts at Merkur Spiel-Arena, showing date, artist, event and attendance
| Date | Artist | Event | Attendance |
|---|---|---|---|
| 7 January 2005 | Herbert Grönemeyer | Mensch-Tour | — |
| 8 January 2005 | Herbert Grönemeyer | Mensch-Tour | — |
| 10 September 2005 | Die Toten Hosen | Friss Oder Stirb Tour | — |
| 12 November 2005 | Phil Collins | The First Final Farewell Tour | — |
| 13 November 2005 | Phil Collins | The First Final Farewell Tour | — |
| 2 December 2005 | Marius Müller-Westernhagen | — | — |
| 20 January 2006 | Depeche Mode | Touring the Angel | — |
| 21 January 2006 | Depeche Mode | Touring the Angel | — |
| 13 May 2006 | Bon Jovi | Have a Nice Day Tour | 47,862 |
| 20 August 2006 | Madonna | Confessions Tour | 44,744 |
| 26 June 2007 | Genesis | Turn It On Again: The Tour | 88,397 |
| 27 June 2007 | Genesis | Turn It On Again: The Tour | 88,397 |
| 12 August 2007 | The Rolling Stones | A Bigger Bang Tour | — |
| 16 June 2008 | Bruce Springsteen · E Street Band | Magic Tour | 33,196 |
| 28 June 2008 | Projekt Revolution | | — |
| 4 September 2008 | Madonna | Sticky & Sweet Tour | 35,014 |
| 31 December 2008 | Sensation | | — |
| 27 August 2009 | Coldplay | Viva la Vida Tour | 41,859 |
| 26 February 2010 | Depeche Mode | Tour of the Universe | — |
| 27 February 2010 | Depeche Mode | Tour of the Universe | — |
| 10 May 2011 | Eurovision Song Contest 2011, 1st Semi-final, 2nd Semi-final, Grand Final | | — |
| 12 May 2011 | Eurovision Song Contest 2011, 1st Semi-final, 2nd Semi-final, Grand Final | | — |
| 14 May 2011 | Eurovision Song Contest 2011, 1st Semi-final, 2nd Semi-final, Grand Final | | — |
| 8 June 2011 | Herbert Grönemeyer | Schiffsverkehr Tour | — |
| 18 June 2011 | Roger Waters | The Wall Live | 35,000 |
| 28 June 2011 | Black Eyed Peas | The Beginning Tour | — |
| 13 July 2011 | Bon Jovi | Bon Jovi Live 2011 | 43,625 |
| 25 July 2011 | Take That | Progress Live | — |
| 3 July 2013 | Depeche Mode | The Delta Machine Tour | 87,308 |
| 5 July 2013 | Depeche Mode | The Delta Machine Tour | 87,308 |
| 6 September 2013 | Roger Waters | The Wall Live | 33,727 |
| 11 October 2013 | Die Toten Hosen | Krach der Republik Tour | — |
| 12 October 2013 | Die Toten Hosen | Krach der Republik Tour | — |
| 7 June 2014 | Udo Lindenberg | — | — |
| 8 June 2014 | Udo Lindenberg | — | — |
| 19 June 2014 | The Rolling Stones | 14 On Fire | 44,224 |
| 2 July 2014 | One Direction | Where We Are Tour | 44,684 |
| 5 September 2015 | Rock im Sektor Festival | | — |
| 26 May 2016 | Paul McCartney | One on One | — |
| 15 June 2016 | AC/DC | Rock or Bust World Tour | — |
| 12 July 2016 | Beyoncé | The Formation World Tour | 34,481 |
| 28 June 2017 | Robbie Williams | The Heavy Entertainment Show Tour | — |
| 9 October 2017 | The Rolling Stones | No Filter Tour | 43,295 |
| 12 October 2018 | Die Toten Hosen | Laune der Natour | — |
| 13 October 2018 | Die Toten Hosen | Laune der Natour | — |
| 18 June 2022 | Rammstein | Rammstein Stadium Tour | 90,772 |
| 19 June 2022 | Rammstein | Rammstein Stadium Tour | 90,772 |
| 24 June 2022 | Die Toten Hosen | 40th Anniversary Tour | 86,531 |
| 25 June 2022 | Die Toten Hosen | 40th Anniversary Tour | 86,531 |
| 17 July 2022 | Lady Gaga | The Chromatica Ball | 45,722 |
| 4 June 2023 | Depeche Mode | Memento Mori World Tour | 86,208 |
| 6 June 2023 | Depeche Mode | Memento Mori World Tour | 86,208 |
| 21 June 2023 | Bruce Springsteen · E Street Band | 2023 Tour | — |
| 27 June 2023 | Harry Styles | Love On Tour | 84,580 |
| 28 June 2023 | Harry Styles | Love On Tour | 84,580 |
| 4 July 2023 | The Weeknd | After Hours til Dawn Tour | 46,932 |
| 20 July 2024 | Coldplay | Music of the Spheres World Tour | 145,402 |
| 21 July 2024 | Coldplay | Music of the Spheres World Tour | 145,402 |
| 23 July 2024 | Coldplay | Music of the Spheres World Tour | 145,402 |
| 18 June 2025 | Guns N' Roses | Because What You Want & What You Get Are Two Completely Different Things Tour | TBA |
| 1 July 2025 | Linkin Park | From Zero World Tour | TBA |
| 8 July 2025 | AC/DC | Power Up Tour | TBA |
| 5 September 2025 | Ed Sheeran | +–=÷× Tour | 190,718 / 190,718 |
| 6 September 2025 | Ed Sheeran | +–=÷× Tour | 190,718 / 190,718 |
| 7 September 2025 | Ed Sheeran | +–=÷× Tour | 190,718 / 190,718 |
| 5 June 2026 | Robbie Williams | Britpop Tour | TBA |
| 6 June 2026 | Robbie Williams | Britpop Tour | TBA |
| 20 June 2026 | Bad Bunny | Debí Tirar Más Fotos World Tour | TBA |
| 21 June 2026 | Bad Bunny | Debí Tirar Más Fotos World Tour | TBA |
| 25 September - 7 October 2026 | Backstreet Boys | Backstreet Boys: Into The Millennium Homecoming: Live In Germany | |
| 17 July 2027 | Karol G | Viajando Por El Mundo Tropitour | |

== Naming rights ==
The naming rights to the stadium are currently held by gambling company Gauselmann.

From July 2009 to August 2018, the clothing manufacturer Esprit held the naming rights. Prior to July 2009, the German airline LTU held the naming rights.

Düsseldorf's mayor Dirk Elbers stated that, due to treaty obligations, the arena would lose its sponsor name and be renamed Düsseldorf Arena for the period of the Eurovision Song Contest 2011 which was held there in May 2011.

The stadium's title sponsor since 2018 is the Merkur Group, a gambling company.

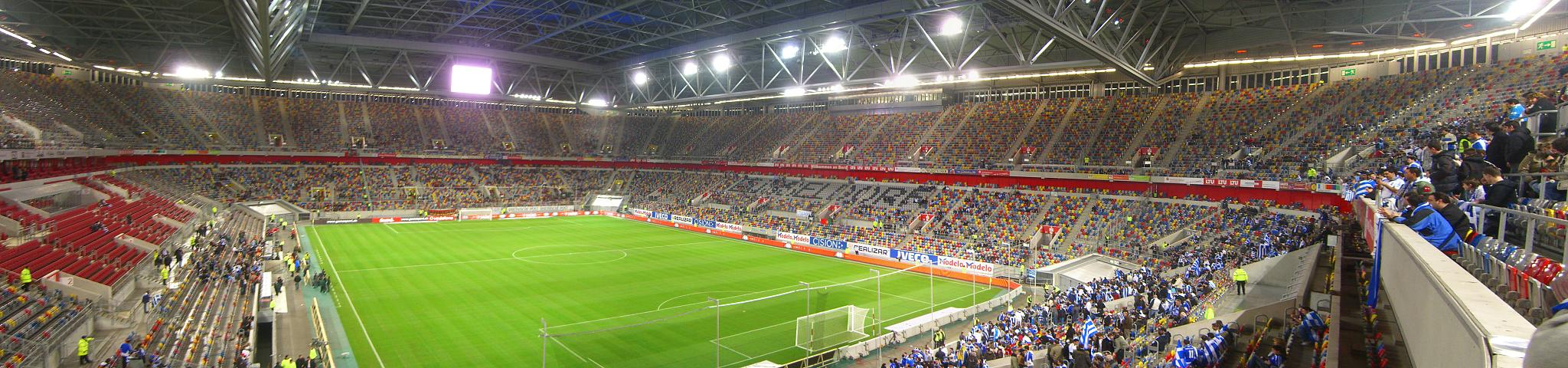
A panorama of Merkur Spielarena

== Public transport ==
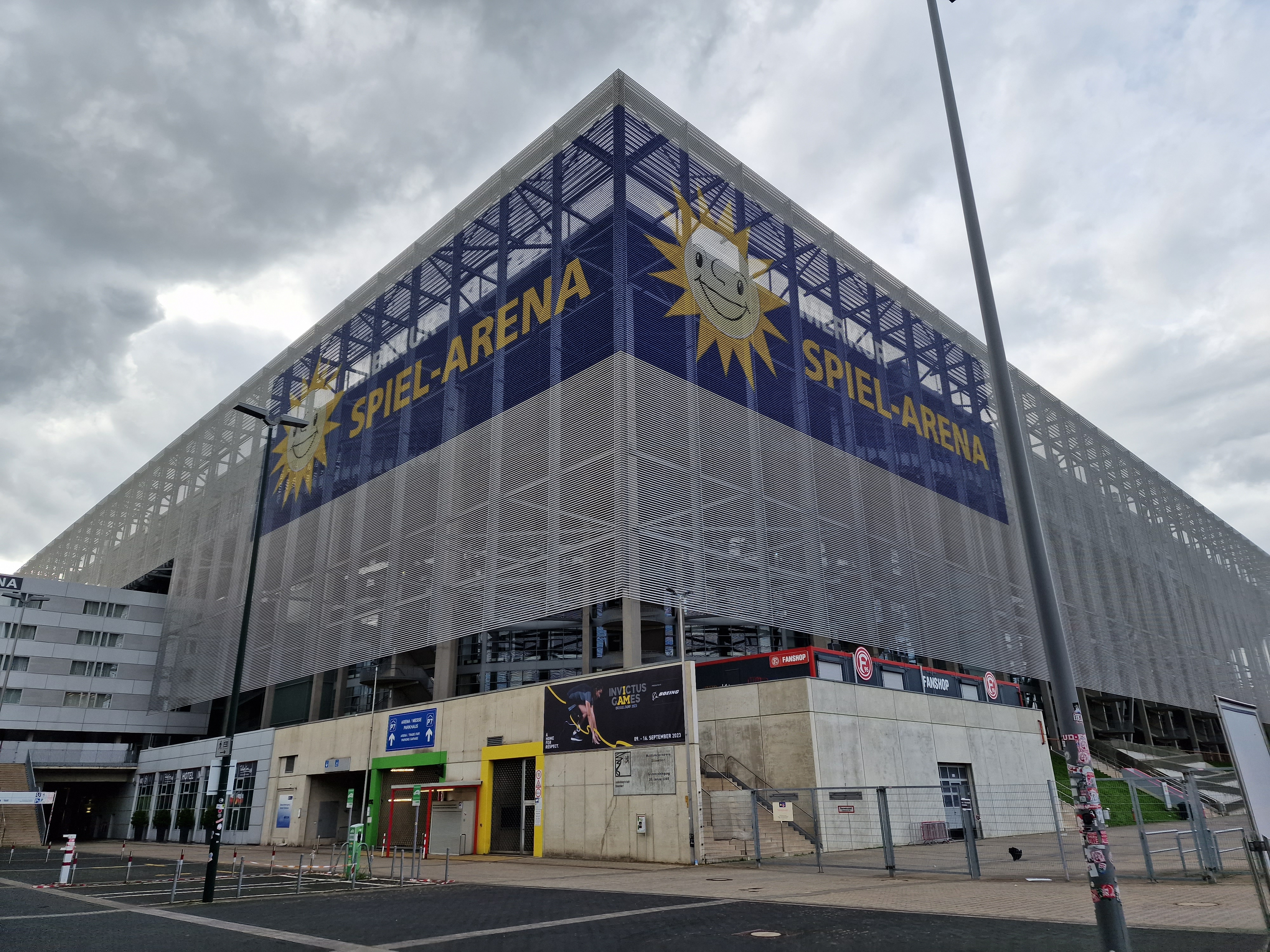
Merkur Spiel-Arena viewed from the Merkur Spiel-Arena/Messe Nord station

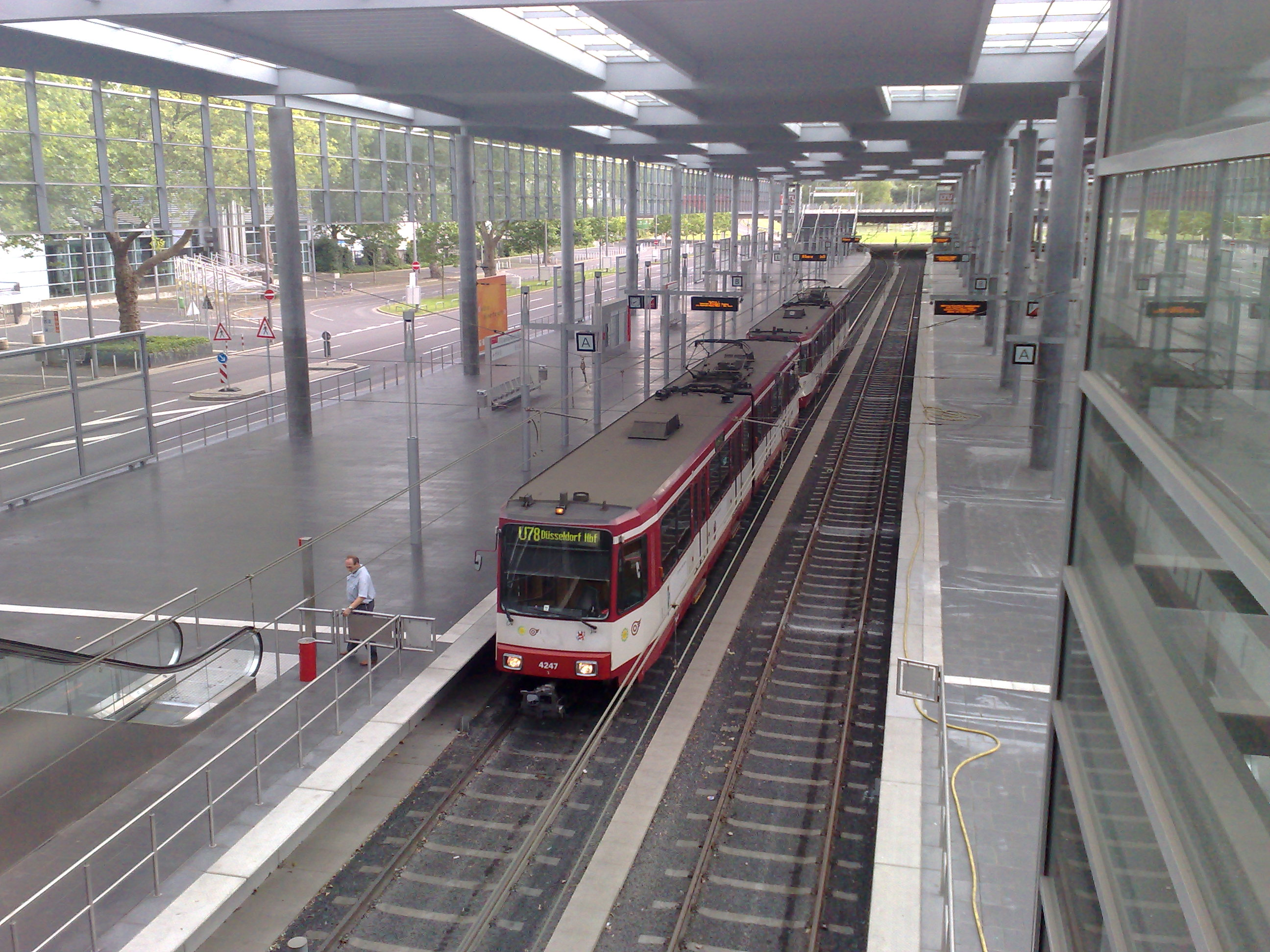
A train of the Düsseldorf Stadtbahn at Merkur Spiel-Arena/Messe Nord station

Merkur Spiel-Arena/Messe Nord is a terminus station of the Düsseldorf urban rail line 78, part of the Verkehrsverbund Rhein-Ruhr (VRR).

| Preceded by Telenor Arena | Eurovision Song Contest; Venue; 2011 | Succeeded by Baku Crystal Hall |
