= Scooby-Doo Mystery =

- SNES box art
- Developers: Sega Genesis: The Illusions Gaming Company; Super NES: Argonaut Software
- Publisher: Acclaim Entertainment
- Producers: Sunsoft; Sega Genesis: Matthew Seymour; Super NES: Darren Drabwell
- Programmers: Sega Genesis: Matt Gilbert; Super NES: Matthew Porter
- Composers: Sega Genesis: Alex Rudis; Kurt Harland; Mark Miller; Super NES: Martin Gwynn Jones; Martin Simpson
- Platforms: Sega Genesis, Super NES
- Release: Sega Genesis: NA: September 1995; Super NES: NA: November 1995
- Genre: Adventure
- Mode: Single-player

Scooby-Doo Mystery is the name of two video games released by Acclaim Entertainment in 1995 and produced by Sunsoft based on the Scooby-Doo franchise. One of the games was released for the Sega Genesis and features a more traditional adventure game-style interface. The other title, released for the Super Nintendo Entertainment System, is an adventure game with platforming elements. Both were released only in North America. In both games, players take control of Shaggy Rogers and Scooby-Doo, who help solve various mysteries with other members of Mystery Incorporated who serve minor roles during gameplay.

== Sega Genesis version ==
This version is a more traditional graphic adventure game divided into two scenarios: "Blake's Hotel" and "Ha-Ha Carnival". The player controls Norville "Shaggy" Rogers, who is followed around by Scooby, while Fred, Daphne, and Velma make brief appearances, often at the beginning and end of a mystery. The object of the game is to solve puzzles to progress, uncover the mystery and catch the monster/criminal to win the scenario. The player has ten different commands located at the bottom of the screen to control Shaggy and solve puzzles. The action menu can be switched to the inventory menu to interact with the items and put them to use. Most of the puzzles require logic to solve, while others require a specific action to solve.

In the first scenario, the gang goes to Daphne's Uncle Blake's hotel where a ghost of a Native American Chieftain has been scaring away clients and staff, with only the gardener and the cook remaining. While the gang goes to investigate, Shaggy and Scooby go inside the hotel only to find Blake has been kidnapped. Eventually Shaggy and Scooby come across a gold mine under the hotel and the heart of the mystery is revealed to be an ancient medallion the ghost is looking for.

In the second scenario, the gang goes to the Ha-Ha Carnival which happens to be closed. An evil clown has sabotaged the services and imprisoned the carnival manager somewhere in the funhouse.

== SNES version ==
=== Gameplay ===
The player controls Shaggy Rogers, who is followed by Scooby-Doo. Each of the game's four levels starts with a cutscene of the Mystery Machine driving along with the characters setting up the next mystery. The object of the game is to find clues to solve each of the four mysteries in the game. These clues can be obtained by finding them in the open, completing a specific task, or having Scooby "sniff out" hidden clues in each area. These clues give the players Mystery points and more points can be earned in the bonus levels. If the player accumulates 10,000 points, they will receive an extra life.

In addition, the player must avoid hazards such as small creatures, falls from high areas, or the main monster of each level. Each of these will add to the player's "Fright Meter" which, if full, will result in the player losing a life. At the beginning of each level, only a small portion of the level will be accessible, but as more clues are found, more areas can be explored.

Shaggy and Scooby can talk with various members of Mystery Incorporated during the game. Daphne periodically gives the duo Scooby Snacks that decrease the fright meter. Velma analyzes clues brought to her that help unravel the mystery and give the players clue points. Once enough clues have been gathered, Velma will send Shaggy to Fred to help him build a trap to catch the monster using specific items the player gathers. The player then has to lure the monster into the trap, thus capturing it so Fred and company can reveal its true identity.

=== Levels ===
There are four levels in the game, and the player receives a password after each one to allow them to return at any time.

- Spooky Shipwreck — The Red Ryan ship is being haunted by a ghostly pirate named "One-Eyed Matt". He is actually after treasure on sunken ships nearby which he planned to melt down and steal.
- Haunted Amusement Park — The Fun Fair is being haunted by an Evil Clown who seeks to close the park as revenge for being fired when he was the park's janitor.
- Spooky Swamp — The Tar Monster is scaring everyone away from this ranch in order to buy the land cheap and then sell it at a profit due to it containing valuable minerals.
- Bradshaw Manor — A Mansion belonging to Daphne's Uncle which is being haunted by an evil vampire named Count Bagosi. He is trying to scare everyone away to protect his illegal counterfeiting operation.

There are two bonus levels hidden in each mystery. The first is found in kitchen areas. In this level, the player moves Scooby, from side to side, catching food items that Shaggy is throwing from the refrigerator onto slices of bread. The food stacks up as it is caught but if Scooby moves too fast some of it will fall. If the sandwich is large enough, then the player will be awarded Groovy Bonus points.

The second is found randomly in each level but usually appears upon entering a new area of the level. On this level, Shaggy plays a game of "Whac-A-Mole" style with a mallet on three vases. The object is to hit as many monsters (ghosts, vampires, knights, etc.) as possible without hitting Scooby or the other members of the gang. Points are added for monster hits and subtracted for hits to friends. Time Bonus, Time Freeze, and Speed Boost can also be collected from the vases to prolong the game and get more points. If the player scores enough points within the time limit, they receive a Scooby Bonus points.

== Reception ==
Reception

Review scores
Publication	Score
Next Generation	SNES: 3/5
Super Game Power	SMD: 3.2/5

The four reviewers of Electronic Gaming Monthly scored the Genesis game a 7.625 out of 10. They particularly praised the game's strong similarity to the TV series, though two of them felt the game to be too short. A reviewer for Next Generation was also enthusiastic about how faithfully the game recreated the look and feel of the show, and also complimented the humor and puzzle design. However, the reviewer felt that the slow-paced interface makes the game too much of a test of one's patience to be worth the rewards, and scored it two out of five stars. Tommy Glide of GamePro too felt the game managed to "capture the show's flavor", but said that only fans of the show would find it of interest.

Next Generation's review of the SNES game again complimented its recreation of the humor and look of the TV show, and again complained of problems with the interface. However, the reviewer gave it a more positive recommendation and a score of three out of five stars, calling it "a good choice for a first-time graphic adventure experience." Quick-Draw McGraw of GamePro similarly called the game "an intriguing adventure for kids", praising its faithful recreation of the show's characters, detailed backgrounds, and soundtrack, though he criticized the absence of the TV show's theme song.
