= Autorité des marchés financiers =

Autorité des marchés financiers may refer to:

- Autorité des marchés financiers (France)
- Autorité des marchés financiers (Quebec)
- Financial Markets Authority of the West African Monetary Union, in French Autorité des Marchés Financiers de l'Union Monétaire Ouest Africaine (AMF-UMOA)
