= Super Caesars Palace =

1993 casino video game

- Japanese cover art
- Developers: The Illusions Gaming Company; Teeny Weeny Games (Game Gear)
- Publishers: NA: Virgin Games; JP: Coconuts Japan
- Composers: Matt Furniss (Game Gear version), Tommy Tallarico; Steve Henefin
- Series: NA: Caesars Palace; JP: Super Casino
- Platforms: Super Nintendo Entertainment System; Sega Genesis; Game Gear
- Release: NA: August 8, 1993; JP: October 21, 1993; Genesis, Game Gear: NA: 1993
- Genre: Casino
- Mode: Single-player

Super Caesars Palace is a Super Nintendo Entertainment System casino video game centered on Caesars Palace in Las Vegas, Nevada. It is the follow-up to Virgin's previous Caesars Palace game. Super Caesars Palace was also released for the Sega Genesis and Game Gear as Caesars Palace. The Japanese version of the game was followed by a sequel, Super Casino 2.

== Gameplay ==
Various people can be interacted with, some of whom have hints for players.

The objective is to win money at a casino. The player begins with $2,000. Games include blackjack, slot machines, roulette, horse racing, keno, video poker, and red dog. The player can talk to non-player characters (a feature omitted in the Japanese version), who may offer advice and clues on how to live the casino lifestyle. The game also offers $100 scratchcards that players can keep scratching to try to win more money. However, if a picture of a bomb is uncovered, the ticket is void and all winnings are nullified.

== Reception ==
Reception

Review scores
Publication	Score
AllGame	SNES: 2.5/5
Game Informer	SNES: 8/10
Game Players	SNES: 8/10
Mean Machines Sega	SMD: 42/100
Nintendo Power	SNES: 12.8/20
VideoGames: The Ultimate Gaming Magazine	SNES: 6/10

Sega Visions, reviewing the Sega Genesis and Game Gear versions, praised the accuracy of each casino game presented in Caesars Palace, "the name of [which] is total gambling realism", and concluded that "If you like to gamble, this is a way to learn the ins and outs of various wagering games without taking a financial beating." VideoGames: The Ultimate Gaming Magazine highlighted that "For those who are into gambling, this is probably a very rad game." In his Complete Guide to Video Games, Nathan Lockard gave an overall rating of 11 out of 30, stating "Other than a good variety of games, this game has terrible controls, which make it very frustrating to play."
