= Paul Gauselmann =

German businessman (1934–2026)

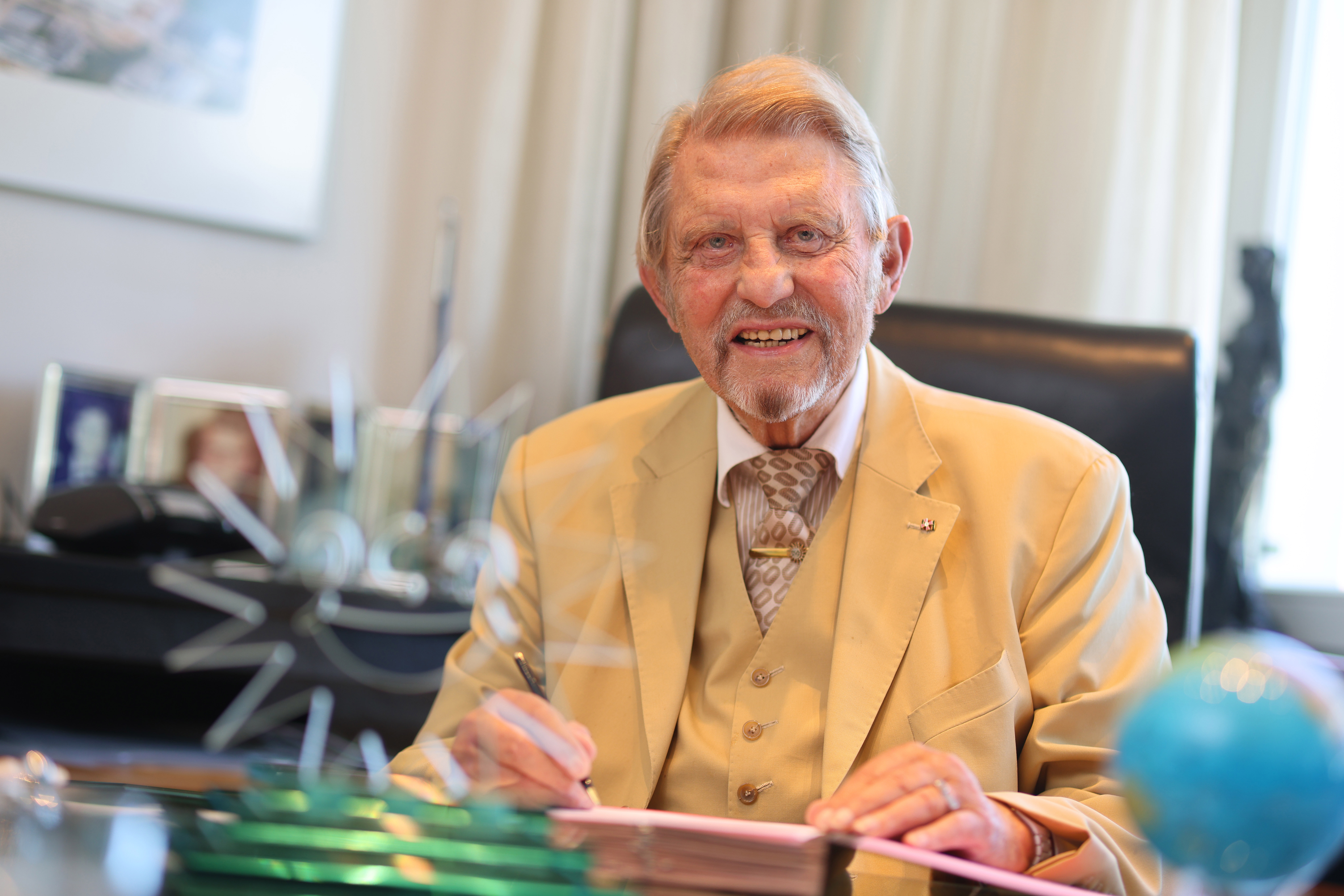
- Gauselmann in 2020
- Born: 26 August 1934; Borghorst, Gau Westphalia-North, Nazi Germany
- Died: 21 August 2026 (aged 91)
- Title: Chairman and CEO
- Children: 4

Paul Gauselmann (26 August 1934 – 21 August 2026) was a German businessman, who was the founder and CEO of Gauselmann, a German company that produces slot machines and runs gambling arcades.

== Early life ==
Paul Gauselmann was born in Borghorst, Gau Westphalia-North, Nazi Germany, on 26 August 1934.

== Career ==
Gauselmann had over 200 of his inventions patented. His company made around 50,000 gaming machines a year.

== Sponsorship ==
At his 65th birthday, Gauselmann initiated the Gauselmann Foundation, which supports social projects in his hometown Espelkamp.

Gauselmann supported many organizations, including:

- TuS-N-Lübbecke (Handball-Bundesliga / National German Handball League)
- German Stroke Foundation (Deutsche Schlaganfall Stiftung)
- TV Espelkamp (Tennis Club - National German League)
- Kaiser-Wilhelm statue

== Personal life and death ==
Gauselmann was married to Karin Gauselmann who is a member of the supervisory board of Gauselmann AG.

Gauselmann died on 21 August 2026, aged 91

== Honours ==
In 1993, Gauselmann received the Federal Cross of Merit (Bundesverdienstkreuz) (Knight's Cross). In 2003, he was awarded the Officer's Cross. He was the honorary citizen of Espelkamp and Lübbecke.
