= Reckoning =

Reckoning may refer to:

== Arts, entertainment, and media ==
=== Music ===
- Reckoning (Grateful Dead album), 1981 live album
- Reckoning (R.E.M. album), 1984 album
- "Reckoning", a song by August Burns Red from Death Below
- "Reckoning", a song by Cave In from Heavy Pendulum
- "Reckoning", a song by The Ghost Inside from Searching for Solace
- "Reckoning", a song by Killswitch Engage from Killswitch Engage (2009 album)
- "Reckoning", a song by Omnium Gatherum from Origin

=== Television ===
- Reckoning (TV series), a 2019 Australian thriller drama
- "Reckoning" (Alias episode)
- "Reckoning" (Andor)
- "Reckoning" (Burn Notice)
- "Reckoning", episode of the television series Everwood
- "Reckoning" (Justified), an episode of the television series Justified
- "Reckoning" (The Killing), an episode of the television series The Killing
- "Reckoning", episode of the television series Revenge
- "Reckoning" (Smallville)
- "Reckoning" (Stargate SG-1), episodes of the television series Stargate SG-1
- "Reckoning", the penultimate season 4 episode of the television series Turn: Washington's Spies
- "Chapter 7: The Reckoning", an episode of The Mandalorian

=== Other uses in arts, entertainment, and media ===
- Reckoning (2004 novel), by Thomas E. Sniegoski from his The Fallen series
- Reckoning (film), American Western film by Jason Rodriguez
- Kingdoms of Amalur: Reckoning, a 2012 video game
- Reckoning (rolling cutter), a finisher move of the professional wrestler Damian Priest
- Mia Yim, an American professional wrestler also known as Reckoning

== See also ==
- Day of reckoning (disambiguation)
- Dead Reckoning (disambiguation)
- The Reckoning (disambiguation)
