= Skybase =

Skybase may refer to:

- Skybase (video game), a 1998 educational video game
- Skybase (New Captain Scarlet), also known as Cloudbase, a fictional aircraft featured in the Captain Scarlet franchise
