= The Reckoning =

The Reckoning may refer to:

== Literature ==
- "The Reckoning", a 1902 short story by Edith Wharton
- The Reckoning, a 1905 novel by Robert W. Chambers
- Le Bilan Malétras, a. k. a. The Reckoning, a 1948 novel by Georges Simenon
- The Reckoning, a 1963 novel by Hugh Atkinson
- The Reckoning (Halberstam book), a 1986 book by David Halberstam on the crises in the U.S. automotive industry from 1973 to the mid-1980s
- The Reckoning (Penman novel), a 1991 novel by Sharon Kay Penman
- The Reckoning, a 1992 novel by Cynthia Harrod-Eagles
- The Reckoning, a 1992 novel by Ruby Jean Jensen
- The Reckoning: The Murder of Christopher Marlowe, a 1992 book by Charles Nicholl
- The Reckoning, a 1994 novel by James Byron Huggins
- The Reckoning, a 1996 novel by Constance Laux, writing as Connie Laux
- The Reckoning, a 1998 novel by Beverly Lewis
- The Reckoning, a 1998 novel by Patricia Robins, writing as Claire Lorrimer
- The Reckoning, a 1999 novel by Thomas F. Monteleone
- The Reckoning, a 1999 novel by Ted Allbeury
- The Reckoning (Long novel), a 2004 novel by Jeff Long
- The Reckoning, a 2005 novel by Sarah Pinborough
- The Reckoning, a 2005 novel by Robert J. Randisi, writing as J. R. Roberts
- The Reckoning, a 2006 novel by Christie Ridgway
- The Reckoning (Armstrong novel), a 2010 novel by Kelley Armstrong
- The Reckoning, a 2010 novel by Howard Owen
- The Reckoning, a 2011 novel by Jane Casey
- The Reckoning, a 2012 novel by Alma Katsu
- The Satyr's Curse II: The Reckoning, a 2014 novel by Alexandrea Weis
- The Reckoning, a 2014 novel by Rennie Airth
- The Reckoning (Grisham novel), a 2018 novel by John Grisham
- The Reckoning (Trump book), a 2021 nonfiction book by Mary L. Trump

== Music ==
=== Albums ===
- The Reckoning (Asaf Avidan & the Mojos album) (2008)
- The Reckoning (EP), a 2006 EP by Comes with the Fall
- The Reckoning (Needtobreathe album)
- The Reckoning (Pillar album)

=== Songs ===
- "The Reckoning" (Iced Earth song)
- "The Reckoning", a 2011 song by The Getaway Plan
- "The Reckoning (How Long)", a 2010 song by Andrew Peterson from Counting Stars
- The Reckoning (Within Temptation song), 2018 song
- "The Reckoning", a 2008 song by F5

== Television ==
- The Reckoning (2011 TV series), a British ITV drama
- The Reckoning (2023 TV series), a British drama about Jimmy Savile
- WWA The Reckoning, a professional wrestling pay-per-view from World Wrestling All-Stars
- "The Reckoning" (Outlander), an episode of Outlander
- "The Reckoning" (Star Trek: Deep Space Nine), an episode of Star Trek: Deep Space Nine
- "The Reckoning" (The Vampire Diaries), an episode of The Vampire Diaries
- "The Reckoning" (Xena: Warrior Princess), an episode of Xena: Warrior Princess
- "Chapter 7: The Reckoning", an episode of The Mandalorian

== Films ==
- The Reckoning (1908 film), a silent film
- The Reckoning (1932 film), an American crime film directed by Harry L. Fraser
- The Reckoning (1970 film), a British drama film by Jack Gold
- The Reckoning (2004 film), a murder-mystery film set in the medieval period
- The Reckoning (2014 film), an Australian crime thriller
- The Reckoning (2020 film), a British adventure horror film

== Gaming ==
- Hunter: The Reckoning, a role-playing game from White Wolf
  - Hunter: The Reckoning (video game) (2002)
- The Reckoning, an expansion for Quake 2

== See also ==
- Dead Reckoning (disambiguation)
- Reckoning (disambiguation)
- "Reckoning Song", a 2008 song from Asaf Avidan and the Mojos album The Reckoning
