= Zero Critical =

1999 video game

- Developer: Istvan Pely Productions
- Publisher: Bethesda Softworks
- Designers: Istvan Pely, Sherban Young
- Artist: Istvan Pely
- Composer: Seth W. Jones
- Platforms: Microsoft Windows, Mac OS
- Release: March 1999
- Genres: Adventure, Science fiction
- Mode: Single-player

Zero Critical (also known as Satin Rift) is a 1999 adventure science fiction video game developed independently by Istvan Pely and published by Bethesda Softworks for PC. It is a 2D third-person game with an emphasis on story and characters. The game was intended as a direct sequel to Majestic (Part I: Alien Encounter) (1995) as it concludes the events of that game. Zero Critical is notable for its scientific realism.

== Gameplay ==
The gameplay takes place over a four-day period and the player is required to complete specific tasks and puzzles before proceeding to the next day. Zero Critical uses the point-and-click approach to move around, find and use inventory objects, examine items and communicate with other characters. Conversations take place through a dialog box with pre-programmed questions and responses to progress in the game when talking to other characters. There is no voice acting in the game, however there are lots of conversations but they are all done in plain text. Conversations are initiated by clicking on a character or showing them an object. It is possible to choose various paths for the conversations. Asking questions normally generates new ones that are added to your list of possible queries. The player's PDA automatically stores dialog transcripts, this allows the player to go back and check on a comment he may have missed.

== Plot ==
Two decades after the Majestic disaster, Zero Critical takes place on Rheom 1, a small extrasolar terrestrial planet of eternal daylight. Rheom has plenty of oxygen and it is believed that there would have to be some areas that had water. The setting on Rheom is rendered by extensive use of shades of gray and muted colors. It is revealed that due to its proximity to the Pleiades cluster, a group of astronomers had built an observation outpost on Rheom 1 to study the nebula nearby (Pleiades Observation Outpost, otherwise known as the Thundercloud Project). This project was halted due to financial difficulties and the outpost fell into disuse until it was renovated ten years later for the SATIN Project, a highly-classified project funded by Interstellar Transportation Commission (ITC). The goal of the project is to develop a new form of long-distance space travel that would eliminate the drawbacks of the extant technology that harnesses traversable wormholes and is unstable, expensive and not terribly efficient. Doctor Victoria Fayn, a Nobel Prize laureate and expert on trans-reality physics, was hired to head the project, leading a small team of the finest scientific and technical minds alive.

The protagonist, Chatt Rhuller is an ITC field agent assigned to undertake his first case: a homicide in the SATIN facility on Rheom 1. Dr. Fayn has killed a fellow scientist, Dr. Dor Geopp, allegedly in self-defense. Subsequently, Chatt is sent to investigate the incident and to deliver an encrypted message to Dr. Fayn. Chatt's supposed quick investigation runs into a snag however, when his shuttle is delayed and he has to stay on base for a few more days.

During his stay, Chatt interviews station staff Dr. Fayn, Dr. Thomas Vilken, Roger Olken, Myna Symmine, Magus Canter, and Eugene Garr. The investigation is for the most part inconclusive but it is gradually revealed that, apart from Geop, three other staff members are equipped with SynCore Symbiotes or syms (microcomputers implanted into the brain to augment its calculation powers). Magus, the station's maintenance worker, and a former member of Thundercloud Project staff, reveals that not far from the SATIN research site lies the resting place of S.S. Majestic, the infamous space ship that was lost and its wreck was supposedly never discovered. Upon investigating the wreckage, Chatt finds a furious Dr. Fayn who seems to have lost someone on board but is adamant to speak about it.

Incidents however, do not leave the SATIN project alone. Strange anonymous messages that warn about the SATIN project appear on utility room's computer (where Chatt sleeps). Dr. Vilken, the project's second in command, is caught attempting to infect SATIN computers with a virus that would have ruined the research to which he was so dedicated. After the incident, he seems cooperative and harmless but largely confused. The good-natured and humorous Roger is the next to go mad; just as he once jokingly has fantasized, he knocks Chatt unconscious and attempts to shoot Dr. Fayn, but kills Magus instead and commits suicide.

Resolved to end the tragedy, Chatt breaks into Dr. Fayn's private quarter and learns of her obsession with S.S. Majestic, space-time continuum and her late love interest Roland Carson, Baron of Sombury, an art collector and one of the missing passengers aboard the Majestic. Chatt also learns that the shuttle's delay is due to Fayn's having dismissed it to prevent Chatt from alerting ITC; the SATIN project is on the verge of fruition and Dr. Fayn is unwilling to risk its being shut down. Chatt also breaks into the main lab and enters a sample SATIN rift which takes him to a room in an intact instance of S.S. Majestic. There, Dr. Vilken invites him to look out of a window overlooking the starry void. Chatt looks out of same window in S.S. Majestic's wreck and discovers a SATIN project's secret operation site.

Towards the end of the game, Chatt learns that Pleiades nebula, the site of the accident, has a unique property that every 2048 years it acts as a gateway into a type of parallel universe and every object that passes through it duplicates. There is an instance of S.S. Majestic that never crashed containing Roland's doppelgänger. Dr. Fayn's aim is to "tractor-beam" this instance of the Majestic back into the universe, but as Chatt learns from the aliens, the removal of Majestic would cause that parallel world to collapse. Chatt also learns that the aliens were trying to warn the scientists by transmitting thoughts and images through their syms, and that is what drove many of them to psychological dysfunction and mental breakdown. The player's final task is to stop the project.

== Development ==
The game is a traditional 2D game created in Director. Istvan Pely began developing the game circa 1997 with his team, Sherban Young (screenplay writer) and Seth W. Jones (musician and sound editor). It was initially titled Satin Rift but it was subsequently published by Bethesda Softworks in 1999 under the name Zero Critical. The game was set to take place a year after the events of Symbiocom to which there are very few references. Zero-Critical was rather intended as a direct sequel to Majestic Part I: Alien Encounter as it concludes the events of that game. The plot revolves around the disappearance of S.S. Majestic, Earth's finest pleasure cruiser and a crowning achievement in space travel, which on her maiden voyage set sail from earth's harbor and never returned. In an interview in 1998, about this concept Istvan Pely said that:

Majestic was inspired by the concept of a great, classic luxury liner in space. The idea was to play off that contrast between the sci-fi/high-tech universe with a very retro, Edwardian style cruise ship. Throwing aliens into the mix made for a very unique take.

Pely relates that his aim was to create a third-person graphic adventure with a heavy emphasis on story and characters. He also relates that he tried to create interesting and detailed environments for both Zero-Critical and Symbiocom as these were explorative games and there wasn't much else to do besides walk around and click on things. The promotional material promised to deliver a story that encompasses three integrated plot elements: sci-fi, mystery and a love story.

A thought-provoking sci-fi adventure game for Macs and PCs. It's a dark and twisted tale about obsession and madness, and a bizarre love the universe could never allow. In this game you explore a variety of 3rd person environments and meet a group of mysterious individuals with many secrets to discover.

== Reception ==
Reception

Review score
Publication	Score
All Game Guide	4/5

All Game Guide said "Zero Critical is full of excitement, intrigue, great music and sound effects and should easily satisfy anyone who is looking for both an interesting story and good gameplay".
