= Symbiocom =

1997 first person adventure video game

- Developer: Istvan Pely Productions
- Publisher: Bethesda Softworks
- Designers: Istvan Pely, Sherban Young
- Artist: Istvan Pely
- Composer: Seth W. Jones
- Platforms: Microsoft Windows, Mac OS
- Release: February 13, 1997
- Genres: Adventure, Sci-Fi/Cyberpunk
- Mode: Single-player

Symbiocom (also known as Syn-Factor) is a first person adventure game developed by Istvan Pely and released in 1997. It is a pseudo-sequel to Majestic Part I: Alien Encounter (1995) and the predecessor to Zero Critical (1999).

== Plot ==
The player is a new service technician aboard I.S.T. Rident, a class B space-faring passenger liner in the Delta quadrant. Implanted into the player's brain is a "symplant" (or simply, a "sym"), a symbiotic artificial intelligence designed by SYNSYM Corporation to act as a companion as well as a tool to help people in scientific and technical disciplines work more efficiently.

The Rident was experiencing a problem with its artificial gravity generators, and as a maintenance engineer, the player was assigned to fix the ship's $G_{1}$ gravity arrays. As a safety measure, Captain Roland Tailor and co-pilot Yuri Ruport decided to keep the ship's worm-drive off-line while the gravity generator is being worked on. Disabling the worm-drive significantly reduced the speed of the vessel. At this point the Rident was attacked by two war ships. The Rident shakes violently, knocking the passengers off balance, and alarms all around the ship start going off. The captain orders an SOS distress signal to be sent and hollers to prepare the lifeboats. The player falls unconscious while busy fixing the ship's gravitomagnetism.

The game begins with the player being woken by alerts from the implanted sym. I.S.T. Rident is left adrift in the depths of space and the player is alone aboard a deserted spacecraft. The player's objectives are to escape from the crippled transport and to find out who destroyed the ship and what happened to the 163 crew members and passengers aboard.

== Development ==
The game was developed by Istvan Pely and his team, Sherban Young (screenplay writer) and Seth Jones (musician and sound editor). Symbiocom was intended as a pseudo-sequel to Majestic Part I: Alien Encounter as it takes place in the same universe. Whilst the storyline and characters of Symbiocom do not continue over in the subsequent game Zero-Critical (1999), there are few references to its events.

In an interview in 1998, Istvan Pely stated that Symbiocom was implemented very close to its original concept. He added that:

I wanted to depict a very realistic future with a story that revolved around a corporate conspiracy, a story about normal human beings and issues. There's a cyberpunk flavor to the game, and it raises interesting concepts about human identity.

== Gameplay and reception ==
The protagonist of this game is both nameless and faceless, a feature that was praised by certain critics. The game is divided into five chapters, each taking place in a completely different environment. Each location is displayed with 3D pre-rendered graphics and a 360° view. Movement is restricted to sudden jumps between still screens and "move along a rail" videos from location to location. The locales are generally unpopulated. There are very few character interactions throughout the game. Most of the player's interactions take place with drones and entertainment robots. The player's sym talks to the player in text only.

The puzzles are inventory and logic types. In his review, Gordon Aplin (1998), states that the puzzles "are not too difficult for experienced adventurers and are logically consistent within the game world." It is possible to die in this game, however the player will be automatically restored to a point before they made their fatal error.

The game has been compared to the film Soylent Green.
