= Istvan Pely =

American video game artist

- Born: United States
- Education: Computer science, Visual arts
- Alma mater: Loyola University Maryland
- Occupation: Video game artist
- Employer: Bethesda Game Studios
- Known for: Fallout series
- Spouse: Hiu-Lai Chong

Istvan Pely is an American computer artist and game developer. He works at Bethesda Game Studios, specializing in art direction and 3D graphics.

His interest in video games began when his father brought home an Apple IIe; Pely enjoyed playing adventure games such as Dragon World and Wrath of Denethenor. He recalls that he "was really drawn to games as a storytelling medium, as well as an interesting challenge in the visual arts."

Pely began studying a computer science major at Loyola University Maryland. Having always been artistically inclined, he found computer science alone to be a bit too technical, while creating games was a "nice way to mesh technology and art." He instead completed a dual major at both computer and art departments. While still a student, he worked part-time as a multimedia consultant where he learned to work with many off-the-shelf packages such as 3D Studio, Photoshop, Premiere, and Director. Sacrificing his grades, with these tools he developed a Mac/PC adventure game called Majestic Part I: Alien Encounter, and managed to get it published before graduating. Since then he has developed two more science fiction games independently: Symbiocom and Zero Critical.

Pely eventually decided to focus solely on 3D art. His project Movkup is an avenue for exploring fantastical mechanical/industrial design. Pely has been with Bethesda Softworks since 1998. As the lead artist of Fallout 3 and Fallout 4, Pely was responsible for the overall visual style of the games, interface graphics, environments, and featured characters. Pely is a self-described "car nut" and having an interest in automotive design, he was also responsible for the design of the game's pre-war vehicles having the aerospace styling cues.

He married Hiu-Lai Chong, who worked as a character artist for Fallout 3.

== Works ==
Year	Work	Role
1995	Majestic Part I: Alien Encounter	Producer, director, graphics, programming
1997	Symbiocom	Design, graphics, programming
1999	Zero Critical	Design, graphics, programming
2001–2004	Movkup	3D-CG-Mechanical-Conceptual
2003	Pirates of the Caribbean	Special thanks
2006	The Elder Scrolls IV: Oblivion	Lead dungeon artist
2008	Fallout 3	Lead artist
2009	The Art of Fallout 3	Co-author
2011	The Elder Scrolls V: Skyrim	Additional graphic design
2015	Fallout Shelter	Art director
2015	Fallout 4	Lead artist
2015	The Art of Fallout 4	Co-author
2018	Fallout 76	Art director
2023	Starfield	Lead artist
