= Piranha Interactive Publishing =

American software publishing firm

Piranha Interactive Publishing, Inc. was an Arizona, United States software publishing firm founded in 1995 with seven principles. The business plan was to secure and publish third-party developer software, thus avoiding the high risk and cost of in-house development, and therefore passing on higher royalties to the licensed developers.

The corporation secured several retail titles in both educational and entertainment genres in the first few years of operation. Early successes led to a successful multimillion-dollar initial public offering (IPO) on NASDAQ in late 1997.

== Software ==
Piranha Interactive's most successful published software title was RedShift 3, an interactive astronomy program that was the winner of the 1999 Codie "Excellence In Software" Award for "Best New Home Education For Teenagers and Adults."

Some other Piranha titles included:

- Air Blocks (IBM PC)
- Ancient Origins (IBM PC) (Macintosh)
- Dead Reckoning (Windows)
- Extreme Tactics (IBM PC)
- Majestic Part I: Alien Encounter (Hybrid Windows/Macintosh)
- Morpheus (Hybrid Windows/Macintosh)
- Planetary Missions (IBM PC) (Macintosh)
- Preschool Mother Goose (Hybrid Windows/Macintosh)
- Revenge of the Toys (IBM PC)
- Skybase (IBM PC) (Macintosh)
- Syn-Factor (Hybrid Windows/Macintosh)

The company also published a number of compilations (or "Piranha Packs") of educational, productivity and entertainment titles.

== Closure ==
The company continued operations until cash-flow problems forced it out of business in July 1999. Piranha Interactive Publishing did not file for Bankruptcy; rather, they closed their doors and liquidated their assets. The following press release was sent out and posted on the company's website:

Piranha Interactive Publishing, Inc. Terminates Operations

For Immediate Release

(July 9, 1999) Tempe, Arizona - Piranha Interactive Publishing, Inc.

Piranha Interactive Publishing, Inc. announced today that it has ceased operations effective as of the close of business on Friday, July 2, 1999. The Company has been unable to generate sufficient cashflow from its operations to meet its expenses and has been unable to secure additional working capital. The Company's securities were delisted from the Nasdaq SmallCap market as of the close of business on June 23. The lack of an active market for Company's securities drastically limited the Company's ability to secure additional capital. The Company is in the process of liquidating all remaining assets and the proceeds will be distributed to creditors. The Company's liabilities are far in excess of its assets. The final distribution to creditors is expected to be de minimis.

== Post-Closure ==
While Piranha completely closed operations in 1999 and is no longer extant, two of the former Piranha employees bought the licenses to some of the software titles and continue to publish them under a different company, Tiburon Interactive.
