= Day of reckoning =

Day of reckoning refers to the Last Judgment of God in Christian and Islamic belief during which everyone after death is called to account for their actions committed in life.

Day of Reckoning may also refer to:

== Music ==
- Day of Reckoning (Destruction album) a 2011 studio album by Destruction
- Day of Reckoning (Diecast album), a 2001 album by Diecast
- Day of Reckoning (Pentagram album), a 1987 album by the doom metal band Pentagram
- "Reckoning Day", the first song on the Megadeth album Youthanasia
- "A Day of Reckoning", a song on the Testament Album The New Order

== Literature ==
- Day of Reckoning: How Hubris, Ideology, and Greed Are Tearing America Apart, 2007 book by Pat Buchanan
- The Day of Reckoning (novel), the eighth novel in the Jedi Apprentice Star Wars series
- Day of Reckoning (novel), a 2000 novel by Jack Higgins

== Film ==
- The Day of Reckoning (film), a 1915 film directed by B. Reeves Eason
- Day of Reckoning (1933 film), starring Richard Dix
- Universal Soldier: Day of Reckoning, a 2012 film
- Day of Reckoning (2016 film), starring Jackson Hurst
- Day of Reckoning (2025 film), starring Kyle Rust

== Television ==
- "Day of Reckoning", 12 O'Clock High season 2, episode 28 (1966)
- "Day of Reckoning", 4th and Loud episode 10 (2014)
- "Day of Reckoning", Amish Mafia season 4, episode 7 (2015)
- "Day of Reckoning", Black Ink Crew: Los Angeles season 2, episode 2 (2022)
- "Day of Reckoning", Blue Heelers season 3, episode 5 (1996)
- "Day of Reckoning", Bonanza season 2, episode 7 (1960)
- "Day of Reckoning", Deadliest Catch season 5, episode 15 (2009)
- "Day of Reckoning", Doctor Who season 2, episode 6; episode 3 of The Dalek Invasion of Earth (1964)
- "Day of Reckoning", Gold Rush season 4, episode 16 (2014)
- "Day of Reckoning", Greenleaf season 3, episode 12 (2018)
- "Day of Reckoning", Lovejoy series 6, episode 2 (1994)
- "Day of Reckoning", Maverick season 1, episode 19 (1958)
- "Day of Reckoning", McLeod's Daughters season 4, episode 4 (2004)
- "Day of Reckoning", Merseybeat series 4, episode 8 (2004)
- "Day of Reckoning", R.C.M.P. episode 28 (1960)
- "Day of Reckoning", Saints & Sinners season 2, episode 6 (2017)
- "Day of Reckoning", Swamp People season 5, episode 20 (2014)
- "Day of Reckoning", The Adventures of Black Beauty series 1, episode 11 (1972)
- "Day of Reckoning", The Alfred Hitchcock Hour season 8, episode 10 (1962)
- "Day of Reckoning", The Bill series 10, episode 32 (1994)
- "Day of Reckoning", The Bill series 23, episode 31 (2007)
- "Day of Reckoning", The Rifleman season 4, episode 28 (1962)
- "Day of Reckoning", The Swamp Fox episode 4 (1960)
- "Day of Reckoning - Part One" and "Day of Reckoning - Part Two", X-Men: Evolution episodes 16–17 (2002)
- "Day of Reckoning", Yukon Men season 4, episode 2 (2014)
- "Days of Reckoning", McLeod's Daughters season 6, episode 21 (2006)
- "Days of Reckoning" and "Days of Reckoning II", State Coroner season 2, episodes 1–2 (1998)
- "The Day of Reckoning", Hi-de-Hi! series 1, episode 4 (1981)
- "The Day of Reckoning", Hugh and I series 3, episode 11 (1964)
- "The Day of Reckoning", Shoebox Zoo series 1, episode 13 (2004)
- "The Day of Reckoning", Survivor: Samoa episode 10 (2006)
- "The Day of the Reckoning", The Travels of Jaimie McPheeters episode 26 (1964)

== In video games ==
- WWE Day of Reckoning, a Nintendo GameCube video game
  - WWE Day of Reckoning 2, the sequel to above

== In other contexts ==
- Affliction: Day of Reckoning, a mixed martial arts event held on January 24, 2009
- Anthony Joshua vs. Otto Wallin & Deontay Wilder vs. Joseph Parker, a boxing event billed as the Day of Reckoning
