= Morpheus (1998 video game) =

- Developer: Soap Bubble Productions
- Publishers: Piranha Interactive Publishing (1998-1999); Tiburon Interactive Publishing (2000-)
- Platforms: Mac OS, Windows
- Release: 1998
- Genre: Adventure
- Mode: Single player

Morpheus is an American computer game released in 1998.

== Gameplay ==
The game is a first-person adventure game similar to Myst with a point and click interface however, the player may also pan around a location by clicking and dragging the mouse. Clicking the mouse to go in a certain direction results in a transition video showing the player's movement.

== Development ==
The game was developed by Soap Bubble Productions, a company founded in 1993.

== Reception ==
Morpheus became a hit in Spain, with sales of 50,000 units in that region. Bob Mandel of The Adrenaline Vault gave the game the "Seal of Excellence".
