= Extreme Tactics =

1998 strategy video game

- Developer: Media Station
- Publisher: Piranha Interactive Publishing
- Platform: Windows
- Release: NA: May 20, 1998; EU: 1998
- Genre: Real-time strategy
- Modes: Single-player, multiplayer

Extreme Tactics is a real-time strategy video game developed by American studio Media Station and published by Piranha Interactive Publishing for Windows in 1998.

== Gameplay ==
On a dying planet where two rival clans battle over the last remaining crystals, the Hammerhawk seek to build a star‑faring fleet to escape to a new world, while the Bloodfox intend to use the crystals to preserve their way of life, even if it means killing for it. Each clan's CD grants access to a design center where players construct their own forces from scratch. By choosing one of five chassis types, selecting a mode of transport—wheels, treads, hoverers, walkers, or flyers—and equipping exotic weapons, players assemble customized fighting machines meant to operate effectively together on the battlefield.

== Development ==
Extreme Tactics was developed by Media Station, a company founded in 1989 and based in Ann Arbor, Michigan. In April 1998, Piranha Interactive Publishing formed a strategic relationship with Epicentric, Inc, to raise the visibility of some of Piranha's upcoming games, which included Extreme Tactics.

== Reception ==
Reception

Review scores
Publication	Score
Computer Games Strategy Plus	2.5/5
Computer Gaming World	2/5
Game Informer	6.5/10
GamePro	3.5/5
GameSpot	5.8/10
Next Generation	3/5
PC Gamer (US)	47%

The game received mixed to unfavorable reviews. Next Generation said, "Is the game truly unique? Not really. Is it fun to play and strangely addictive? Yes. It may not be all that different, but it will keep you entertained for hours." Games Domain called Extreme Tactics design bad and the presentation poor.

According to Media Station, Extreme Tactics faced stiff competition, and sale's didn't live up to expectations.
