= Solar System Explorer =

1996 video game

- Developer: Maris Multimedia
- Publishers: Maris Multimedia, Focus Multimedia (UK), Piranha Interactive Publishing
- Platform: Windows
- Release: 1996
- Genre: Educational video game
- Mode: Single-player

Solar System Explorer, later renamed Planetary Missions, is an educational video game developed by UK-based studio Maris Multimedia and published by Maris Multimedia, Focus Multimedia in the United Kingdom, and, under the Planetary Missions name, Piranha Interactive Publishing. It was released in 1996 for Windows and MacOS. The game is set in the year 2019 on a high-tech crewed spaceplane, the Explorer, that has the capability to fly to any planet in the Solar System and launch probes to study them. The game was praised for its amount of content and value.

== Gameplay ==
The player navigates the interior of the ship in point-and-click adventure format, while various scenes are shown in computer animation. The ship can be piloted to any planet or moon in the Solar System, entering its orbit to study its magnetic field, weather, seismology, and atmosphere, look at detailed geographical maps, as well as drop probes onto its surface if possible.

== Reception ==
Tom Wilkie of The Independent called the game's graphics "impressive", though he criticized one fact about life on Mars as potentially misleading. He noted the high amount of computing power required to run it at the time. Boot rated the game highly, the reviewer calling it "realistic and highly accurate" and saying they enjoyed the game's animated aspects, but criticizing the grandiose, marble-covered design of the spacecraft's interior as unrealistic in comparison. PC Review wrote that "being able to plot a course from Earth to the outer rocks from the Sun is a remarkable achievement which Solar System Explorer offers up on a plate," calling the game "well worth a quick dip into the pocket". Jerzy Poprawa of CD-Action recommended the game to everyone above 12 years old, describing it as "finger-licking good".
