= Dead Reckoning (disambiguation) =

Dead reckoning is a process for estimating the value of a variable quantity by using a previous value and adding any changes.

Dead Reckoning may also refer to:

== Film and television ==
- Dead Reckoning (1947 film), a film by John Cromwell
- Dead Reckoning (1990 film), a film by Robert Michael Lewis
- Dead Reckoning (2020 film), a film by Andrzej Bartkowiak
- Mission: Impossible – Dead Reckoning Part One, a 2023 film
- Land of the Dead or Dead Reckoning, a 2005 film, or the name of the firework launching vehicle from the film
- "Dead Reckoning" (The Professionals), an episode of the television series
- "Dead Reckoning", an episode of the television series NCIS
- "Dead Reckoning" (Justice League Unlimited), a television episode
- "Dead Reckoning" (Person of Interest), a season 2 episode of Person of Interest

== Game ==
- Dead Reckoning (video game), a 1998 computer game by Piranha Interactive Publishing

== Literature ==
- Dead Reckoning (novel), the eleventh novel in The Southern Vampire Mysteries by Charlaine Harris
- Dead Reckoning, a novel by Kenneth Bulmer
- Dead Reckoning: Memories of the 1971 Bangladesh War, a book of history by Sarmila Bose
- Dead Reckoning, a play by Eric Chappell
- Dead Reckoning, a 1978 novel by C. Northcote Parkinson

== Music ==
- Dead Reckoning (album), a 2007 album by Threshold
- Dead Reckoning Records, a record label
- Dead Reckoning, a 2001 album by Small Brown Bike
- Dead Reckoning, a 2011 album by The Builders and the Butchers
- "Dead Reckoning", an instrumental composition by Clint Mansell
- "Dead Reckoning", a song by Diamond Head from the album Am I Evil
- "Dead Reckoning", a song by Ratt from the album Ratt
- "Dead Reckoning", a song by Petra from the album This Means War!
