= Dead Reckoning (video game) =

1998 video game

- Developer: Goldtree Enterprises
- Publisher: Piranha Interactive Publishing
- Platform: Windows
- Release: 1998
- Modes: Single-player, multiplayer

Dead Reckoning is a 1998 video game from Piranha Interactive Publishing.

== Gameplay ==
Dead Reckoning is a fast-paced, 360-degree shooter that places players in a sci-fi deathmatch scenario where survival means facing ever-tougher alien opponents—and failure spells doom for Earth. While the premise might appeal to fans of high-octane action, the execution falls short in a post-Incoming and Barrage landscape, where visual and gameplay standards have evolved. The game offers 15 cylindrical combat arenas with varied aesthetics, from industrial grit to infernal chaos, but the single-player experience quickly becomes monotonous. Multiplayer support for up to six players adds some replayability, though it doesn't fully redeem the repetitive design. Graphics are competent but underwhelming, especially given the lack of robust 3D acceleration. The standout features are its punchy sound effects and compatibility with Microsoft's Sidewinder Force Feedback joystick, which adds a tactile layer to the gameplay. Ultimately, Dead Reckoning caters to hardcore shooter enthusiasts but feels like a relic—derivative, dated, and lacking the depth or innovation needed to stand out.

== Development ==
The game was developed by Goldtree Enterprises, a company founded in 1993 in New Orleans. It was in development for two years and was originally scheduled to release in 1997.

== Reception ==
Reception

Review scores
Publication	Score
Computer Gaming World	2/5
PC Games	11%
PC Player	48/100

Computer Gaming World said "Best suited for die-hard blast maniacs, Dead Reckoning is simply too dated and derivative for its own good."

The game was nominated for the Codie award for Best New Arcade/Action Software Game for 1998 by the Software Publishers Association.
