= List of Gold Rush episodes =

Gold Rush (formerly Gold Rush Alaska) is a reality television series that airs on Discovery Channel, with reruns also airing on TLC. The show's sixteenth season began airing on November 7, 2025 and concluded on May 1, 2026. As of May 1, 2026, a total of 428 episodes of Gold Rush have been aired, including two mini-series.

== Series overview ==
Season	Episodes	Originally aired	
Season	Episodes	Season premiere	Season finale
1	10	December 3, 2010	February 18, 2011
2	16	October 28, 2011	February 24, 2012
3	16	October 26, 2012	February 22, 2013
South America	5	August 2, 2013	October 18, 2013
4	18	October 25, 2013	March 14, 2014
5	19	October 17, 2014	March 13, 2015
6	19	October 16, 2015	March 11, 2016
7	21	October 14, 2016	March 10, 2017
8	20	October 13, 2017	March 9, 2018
9	21	October 12, 2018	March 22, 2019
10	21	October 11, 2019	March 6, 2020
11	21	October 23, 2020	March 19, 2021
Winter's Fortune; 2021	8	July 30, 2021	September 10, 2021
12	24	September 24, 2021	March 25, 2022
13	26	September 30, 2022	March 31, 2023
14	23	September 29, 2023	March 1, 2024
15	23	November 2, 2024	April 18, 2025
16	23	November 7, 2025	May 1, 2026
17	TBC	October 2, 2026	

== Episodes ==
=== Season 1 (2010–2011) ===
During season 1, the series was named Gold Rush: Alaska, and the mining occurred at Porcupine Creek, on the Alaskan panhandle.

No. in series	No. in season	Title	Original air date	U.S. viewers (millions)
1	1	"No Guts No Glory"	December 3, 2010	2.17
Six recession-hit patriots from Oregon stake everything on mining and head north to Alaska to dig for gold and save themselves from financial ruin. The team of greenhorns beg, borrow and build all the equipment they need to mine for gold. Loaded with supplies, they leave their loved ones behind and drive from Oregon to southeast Alaska in a Klondike convoy.
2	2	"Gold, Guns and Bears"	December 10, 2010	2.07
The stakes get higher at the Porcupine Creek prospect as reality sets in about just how little time they have to get to their gold. The miners start to rebuild the mining ghost town but the bears aren't so keen on their new neighbors — and they let them know it.
3	3	"Running Dirt"	December 17, 2010	2.92
The crew races to set up the mining plant and start running dirt. When the families arrive from Oregon and question the lack of gold — and master mechanic Harness becomes dangerously ill — the tension builds so high that Dorsey and Todd almost come to blows.
4	4	"The Ultimate Price"	January 7, 2011	3.71
The team attempts to finally run potential pay dirt through the wash plant. But a visit from the Department of Fish and Game reveals a violation, jeopardizing their vital water supply to the mine. Then disaster strikes as Todd's daughter fights for her life.
5	5	"The Pain Barrier"	January 14, 2011	3.54
The miners continue to run dirt but an equipment malfunction brings the operation to a halt. Meanwhile, James Harness collapses and Jimmy Dorsey drives a wedge between himself and the crew when he takes on an extra job to earn cash. But hard work late into the night finally hits a pay streak.
6	6	"Gold Fever"	January 21, 2011	3.30
The miners' futures are on the line at Porcupine Creek. After 80 days, the miners are behind schedule; the Hoffmans have run out of money and deliver the crew an ultimatum: find $10,000 worth of gold in the next two days, or the families have to head home to Oregon. Meanwhile, after Dorsey struggles with the wave table, tensions flare and fists fly.
7	7	"Going for Broke"	January 28, 2011	3.43
With winter weather closing in, a gold-recovery expert comes to help the rookies. Todd discovers a major design flaw in the equipment and is forced to make huge modifications. With the credit cards maxed out, he is forced to take desperate measures.
8	8	"Bad Blood"	February 4, 2011	3.66
The crew remains in a deep financial hole. Veteran miner Dakota Fred thinks he can turn things around and he cranks up production faster than ever before. But when things start falling apart, tensions mount and Harness can't keep his frustration in.
9	9	"Bedrock or Bust"	February 11, 2011	3.89
Desperate to get to bedrock and large quantities of gold, Todd and Jack throw caution to the wind and dig deeper than ever before. With the brutal Alaskan winter threatening, they battle floods, cave-ins and equipment breakdowns.
10	10	"Never Say Die"	February 18, 2011	4.55
With the arctic winter looming, the crew races against the clock. Rain and thawing snow flood the mine and Jack puts his life on the line as the glory hole caves in around the massive 100,000-pound excavator.
11	Special	"Full Disclosure"	February 25, 2011	2.49
The Hoffman crew spent five months and over quarter of a million dollars in a desperate attempt to find gold in Alaska. This special episode reveals what went wrong and how the guys plan to hit the mother lode next season.

=== Season 2 (2011–2012) ===
For season 2, the series was retitled Gold Rush. The show followed groups of miners at locations in both the panhandle of Alaska, USA, and in the Klondike of the Yukon, Canada.

No. in series	No. in season	Title	Original air date	U.S. viewers (millions)
12	Special	"The Off-Season"	October 28, 2011	2.29
13	1	"Twist of Fate"	October 28, 2011	3.33
The Hoffmans have to find gold – and fast. The crew arrives in Porcupine Creek reinvigorated and, in record time, they are on the gold. But just as they celebrate their best clean-out ever, Dakota Fred returns and drops a bombshell on Todd, Jack and crew.
14	2	"Virgin Ground"	November 4, 2011	3.85
The Hoffman crew heads north to the Klondike in a desperate bid to find a new claim and salvage their mining season. 16-year-old Parker Schnabel takes over the Big Nugget Mine, while Dakota Fred gets a new start at Porcupine Creek.
15	3	"Family Feud"	November 11, 2011	4.15
Jack and Todd go head-to-head over how to set up their new claim. At Porcupine Creek, Dakota Fred rips out the wash plant and finds gold that he forced the Hoffmans to leave behind. At Big Nugget Mine, Parker continues to hit pay dirt.
16	4	"Slippery Slope"	November 18, 2011	3.58
The Hoffman crew confronts the permafrost that lies between them and the gold. As the Dakota Boys set up their new wash plant, Fred pushes his son too hard and Dustin storms off. Parker faces a breakdown that leaves his mining season at a standstill.
17	5	"Drill or Die"	November 25, 2011	4.49
A crew rebellion forces Todd Hoffman to dig test holes on the claim. The tension mounts as they wait to see whether they're sitting on a gold-rich paystreak – or about to go bust. Then, Fred is forced to abandon mining as floods in North Dakota destroy his home.
18	6	"Lovestruck"	December 2, 2011	4.74
The Hoffmans are finally on the gold, but a new love threatens to derail mechanic James Harness right when the crew needs him most. Desperate for pay dirt, Parker bulldozes a dangerous road up the side of a mountain and Fred returns to Porcupine Creek after facing the loss of his North Dakota home.
19	7	"Gold At Last"	December 9, 2011	4.65
The Hoffmans realize they could be losing thousands of dollars of gold out of the end of their sluices and they are forced to tear apart the wash plant and rebuild. In his quest for virgin ground at Smith Creek, Parker turns into a lumberjack to get back on the gold.
20	8	"On The Gold"	December 16, 2011	5.38
With the washplant prepped, the Hoffman crew finally has their first clean-out of the season. Back in Alaska, Dakota Fred works furiously to win the "more-gold-in-a-week" bet that he made with Jack. At Big Nugget, Parker clashes with his grandfather when John wants to shut down the wash plant.
21	Special	"Cameramen - Behind the Scenes - Special"	December 23, 2011	3.96
This episode follows the production crew and shows the difficulties of filming Gold Rush
22	Special	"After the Rush - Special"	December 30, 2011	2.75
In this episode of Gold Rush, the executive producer interviews the miners.
23	9	"Dead in the Water"	January 6, 2012	4.69
Jack Hoffman's precious excavator gets stranded in the creek and requires emergency surgery in the wilderness. Meanwhile, the crew fine-tunes their wash plant – which doubles their efficiency at finding gold. Parker does the work of two men until an argument with his mother threatens to shut him down.
24	10	"Twenty Four Seven"	January 13, 2012	5.48
Short on time, the Hoffman crew decides to run night and day in a struggle to get to the gold, while a federal mining inspector pays a surprise visit to both Fred and Parker. The inspector finds safety violations and both operations face closure.
25	11	"Rock Bottom"	January 20, 2012	4.81
The Hoffman crew is dead in the water until Harness can repair their broken excavator. Parker Schnabel totals his gold for the season and hands the Big Nugget Mine back to his grandpa. Meanwhile, the Dakota boys lock horns trying to re-open their mine.
26	12	"Bedrock Gold"	January 27, 2012	4.24
A key crew member calls it quits at Quartz Creek. Meanwhile, massive rocks break Dakota Fred's de-rocker and Parker reconsiders his future after smelting his 35 oz season haul into a solid gold bar.
27	13	"Man Down"	February 3, 2012	4.88
A heart attack has 91-year-old John Schnabel battling for his life. The Hoffmans find a gold nugget that becomes a game-changer and Dakota Fred accomplishes what Jack Hoffman never managed to do at Porcupine creek.
28	14	"In the Black"	February 10, 2012	4.85
The Hoffman crew risks it all to run through the night in a bid to finally break even for the season. Fred has to abandon his best paydirt yet when his excavator gets stuck in the pit. John Schnabel returns to the Big Nugget Mine after his heart attack.
29	15	"Frozen Out"	February 17, 2012	5.31
The Hoffman crew battles frozen dirt and frozen pipes as they struggle to hit their goal of 100 oz. Parker makes a last-ditch effort at Smith Creek Hill and the Dakota Boys' season may be over when Dustin smashes the side of the wash plant.
30	16	"Judgement Day"	February 24, 2012	5.06
The Hoffman crew is desperate to get 100 ounces, but Todd's decision to run the dozer on solid ice ends in disaster. The Big Nugget Mine faces closure if Parker fails to hit a pay streak and Dakota Fred thinks he's finally found Jack Hoffman's glory hole.
31	Special	"Revelations"	March 2, 2012	3.90
32	Special	"Aftershow - Digging Deeper"	March 9, 2012	2.47
33	Special	"Aftershow - The Last Word"	March 23, 2012	2.47

=== The Jungle Special (2012) ===
No. in series	No. in season	Title	Original air date	U.S. viewers (millions)
34	—	"The Jungle"	August 17, 2012	2.66
Frozen out of the Klondike, Todd Hoffman gets a hot tip on a gold claim in Guyana, South America. But to get there he must lead his crew through the snake-infested jungle, dangerous business deals and up deadly rivers in a "no guts, no glory" adventure.
35	—	"Aftershow"	August 17, 2012	2.03

=== Season 3 (2012–2013) ===
No. in series	No. in season	Title	Original air date	U.S. viewers (millions)
36	Special	"The Long"	October 19, 2012	
37	Special	"Off-Season Special"	October 25, 2012	2.02
38	Special	"Do or Die"	October 26, 2012	2.09
39	1	"Million Dollar Season"	October 26, 2012	4.45
Todd and new Indian River boss Dave Turin bring in 12 new machines, and 11 new crew for the season. Dakota Fred's glory hole is thought to contain millions in gold, but 4ft of snow is in the way. Parker hires a new crew and sets his sights on new land.
40	2	"The Wrong Claim"	November 2, 2012	4.41
Dave faces disaster when he finds his new claim is un-minable. Todd is thousands of dollars in the hole and the 1,000-ounce goal looks impossible. The Dakota boys face the threat of historic floods and Parker desperately needs to secure new ground.
41	3	"Secret Weapons"	November 9, 2012	4.09
Todd secures new rights to Indian River for Dave Turin's crew, on the claims the crew "accidentally" drilled. The new "Big Red" wash plant is assembled, and nearly destroyed in the first test. Todd junks his old washplant, after finding out it's losing gold, only to discover his new washplant is weeks away. At the Big Nugget Mine in Alaska, Parker sets a goal: find $40,000.00 of gold in one week. He hits his goal, even with a gold thief on the loose. Meanwhile, Fred Hurt brings in a new wheel-loader, and hires two new miners, but a shocking revelation one week in forces him to quickly fire one of them.
42	4	"Battle of The Bridge"	November 16, 2012	4.10
At Quartz Creek, the mine is at a standstill since Todd ripped out their washplant. The delay on Todd's replacement threatens to ruin his season. Todd heads 1,800 miles south to confront the manufacturer and get the ‘turbo trommel’ back on track. But while he's gone, his chief investor Jason Otteson arrives on the claim to find chaos – and no Todd. Jason is furious and threatens to pull the plug on their season. At Indian River, Team Turin bites off more than they can chew. They attempt to strip a massive cut in the mid-summer sun and, when one of their two dozers breaks down, they face losing it all in a sea of melted permafrost. Parker Schnabel faces a cash-flow crisis. To earn some quick cash, he takes on a contract to replace the bridge leading to the Dakota Boys' claim. But when Parker refuses to provide Fred and Dustin with temporary access, the two claims square up for war.
43	5	"The Ultimatum"	November 23, 2012	4.69
Todd's chief investor demands to see 100 ounces of gold in the next three weeks – or he will pull the plug on the Klondike operation. At Indian River, Dave Turin is on the gold. Parker's crew goes into meltdown when he forces them to replace a bridge, while Fred attempts to make a precision part for the 270's track out of scrap metal.
44	6	"Game Changer"	November 30, 2012	4.59
Todd finally takes delivery of the Turbo Trommel. Dave's mine at Indian River digs deeper in search of gold, and pulls 33 oz in a week. The Dakota Boys are forced to run second-hand dirt, pulling 7 oz in 2 days, and Parker doubles shifts to finally haul 55 oz – worth $80,000 – in 1 week.
45	7	"Road To Gold"	December 7, 2012	4.71
Todd and his crew finally get to test the new Turbo Trommel, but nearly destroy it while getting it into place. Dave pushes his crew to double their last clean-out and, despite a jammed tree in the feeder, pull 60 oz in a week. The Dakota Boys receive a visit from an inspector with the power to shut down their mine, but they pass inspection. Parker brings in dynamite to blast a big solid rock to finish building a new road to Smith Creek.
46	8	"Up Smith Creek"	December 14, 2012	4.61
Todd Hoffman faces closure if he fails to get 100 ounces of gold for his investor. The Dakota Boys believe they've finally found the elusive Glory Hole. Parker Schnabel uncovers the two-year mystery of Smith Creek just as his grandpa reveals some bad news.
47	Special	"Behind the Scenes"	December 21, 2012	2.01
48	Special	"Bio Special"	December 28, 2012	2.01
49	9	"Leprechaun Gold"	January 4, 2013	4.80
Parker finds out about the fate of his Grandpa, and finds new ground. Todd's Turbo-Trommel is back up and running after having an engine replaced, Indian River hits Bedrock, and the Dakota Boys investigate the truth behind the Glory Hole Waterfall.
50	10	"Dozer Wars"	January 11, 2013	4.90
Todd and Dave go to war over the dozer they both need to keep mining and Todd banks on finding virgin ground beneath a pile of dredge tailings. Parker faces a crew rebellion and Dakota Fred attacks the Glory Hole with his secret weapon – the bedrock shark.
51	11	"Pink Slip"	January 18, 2013	4.62
Todd calls it quits on his turbo trommel and shuts down his Quartz Creek operation. Dave's race to open a new cut leaves his dozer hanging over a cliff. Parker finally hits bedrock at Emerson Trench and two broken machines force Fred to go deeper in debt.
52	12	"The Merger"	January 25, 2013	4.55
Todd forces his crew and Dave's crew to merge into one team. The Dakota Boys use their new equipment to get back down to the bottom of the Glory Hole. Parker risks his life to get pay dirt from an abandoned mine site down a dangerous mountain road.
53	13	"The Night Shift"	February 1, 2013	4.70
Tensions mount between the day shift and night shift as Todd pushes his men harder than ever. Parker battles his ancient washplant and the treacherous road from Discovery Claim while Dustin risks it all diving for hidden gold in the frozen glory hole water.
54	14	"Bedrock Blowout"	February 8, 2013	4.87
Todd pushes the Big Red washplant to near breaking point on his best ground yet. Fred and Dustin battle to save a broken down excavator as water floods the glory hole and Parker faces his worst nightmare as the dangerous mine road claims its first victim.
55	15	"Redemption Road"	February 15, 2013	4.61
Out of Indian River pay dirt, Todd comes up with a risky plan to hit his 1,000-ounce goal. A bad fall puts Fred out the game, leaving Dustin to dig the glory hole. Parker worries his season is over – but his grandpa is convinced he's near the mother lode.
56	16	"The Motherlode"	February 22, 2013	4.46
Winter strikes and the miners wage the final battle for the mother lode. The Hoffmans pull out a secret weapon to thaw frozen gold-rich pay dirt. Dustin plunges into the freezing waters of the Glory Hole and Parker mines the last ground at Big Nugget.
57	Special	"Behind the Scenes"	March 1, 2013	1.60
The Producer sits down with the miners and discusses the season

=== South America (2013) ===
No. in series	No. in season	Title	Original air date	U.S. viewers (millions)
58	1	"Peruvian Gold"	August 2, 2013	2.39
After quitting mining in the Klondike, Todd sets his sights on South America and flies his crew to Peru. But to find gold-rich ground to mine, they must overcome dense jungle, lethal roads, and turf wars with local miners on their epic journey.
59	2	"Chilean Gold"	August 9, 2013	2.43
The Hoffman crew flies to Chile in hopes of getting a slice of the country's 3,750 tons of untapped gold reserves. They prospect on a remote beach and high in the Andes Mountains, pushing the crew to its limits.
60	3	"Guyanese Gold"	August 16, 2013	2.24
The Hoffman crew heads to the jungles of Guyana after striking out in their hunt for South American gold in Chile and Peru. Running short on time and money Todd needs to deliver gold-rich pay dirt to convince his crew to abandon the Klondike.
61	4	"The Frozen North"	August 23, 2013	2.65
18-year-old Parker Schnabel leaves home and the Big Nugget Mine to set up his own operation in the Klondike on Tony Beets' land and practices his hot-wiring skills on the Hoffmans' old equipment. In Alaska, the Dakota Boys take to the skies trying to find a way to the source of all the gold in Porcupine Creek.
62	5	"Ends of the Earth"	August 30, 2013	1.75
The production team gives a behind-the-scenes look at what it took to film Gold Rush: South America.

=== Season 4 (2013–2014) ===
No. in series	No. in season	Title	Original air date	U.S. viewers (millions)
63	Special	"Southern Quest"	October 18, 2013	1.42
In the quest for gold, the Hoffman crew quits the Klondike to hunt down gold-rich ground in South America. The Dakota Boys set their sights on the virgin mountain claim known as Cahoon Creek. 18-year-old Parker Schnabel leaves home to mine for Klondike gold.
64	1	"Queen Of Diamonds"	October 25, 2013	2.86
The season premiere breaks ground in 3 countries. The Hoffman crew moves their operation to the hostile Guyana jungle. The Dakota boys need to find a safe route over thin ice. Parker is out of cash and must find gold – but Tony Beets has bad news for him.
65	Special	"New Ground"	November 1, 2013	1.12
66	2	"Learning Curve"	November 1, 2013	3.02
Todd faces disaster when he discovers his claim has been mined out. The Dakota Boys fight over rival mining plans, with one plan high in the mountains, and the other deep in the hole. Parker ignores Tony Beets, but still manages to hit his first pay dirt.
67	3	"In Too Deep"	November 8, 2013	3.14
The Hoffman crew battles the hostile jungle to get vital mining equipment to the claim. The Dakota Boys drill to find out whether the glory hole contains millions in gold. Parker is on the warpath when a new crew member throws out his gold.
68	4	"Road from Hell"	November 15, 2013	3.33
The Hoffman crew attempts to set up their washplant, but the jungle fights them every step of the way. The Dakota Boys find their first bedrock gold in the glory hole. In the Klondike, Parker gets more gold out of Little Blue than the Hoffmans ever did.
69	5	"Garnets or Gold"	November 22, 2013	3.65
Todd makes a shocking departure. Parker is forced to rebuild his wash plant after losing gold. The Dakota Boys finally hit the bottom of the Glory Hole.
70	6	"Mutiny"	November 29, 2013	3.66
Todd returns to Guyana expecting 20 ounces of gold but gets a nasty shock. Parker faces a mutiny and seeks advice from his grandpa. The Dakota Boys expect a huge payout from the glory hole but get a crushing blow instead.
71	7	"Paid in Full"	December 6, 2013	4.22
Todd makes an incredible discovery while searching for new gold-rich ground. Parker needs his best clean-out ever in order to stop Todd from repossessing his dozer. Just as Fred gives up on the Glory Hole, it suddenly pays out big.
72	8	"Jungle Boogie"	December 13, 2013	3.49
Todd abandons gold and switches to diamond mining. In Alaska, Dustin gets stranded in the mountains during the worst electrical storm in twenty years. Parker's need for speed destroys his wash plant.
73	Special	"Ready to Roll"	December 20, 2013	3.03
Behind the scenes with the production crew
74	9	"Hope Creek"	January 3, 2014	3.55
Dave returns to the Hoffman crew and butts heads with Todd over their mining plan. The Dakota boys stake their future on a new cut; Parker gets a second chance at mining with one of the largest wash plants in the Klondike.
75	10	"Blowout"	January 10, 2014	3.90
A tropical storm floods the Hoffmans' operation and Dave is forced to dive deep into the pit. Parker is running one of the biggest washplants in the Klondike and needs to prove it will deliver. The Dakota boys get the biggest clean-out of their season.
76	11	"Death of a Dream"	January 17, 2014	4.02
In the first part of a two-part episode, Parker hires yet another ex-Hoffman crew member while Todd grows more and more desperate. In the end, two crews get their biggest gold clean-outs to date, while the third faces an abrupt end to their season.
77	12	"The Resurrection"	January 20, 2014	3.47
In the second part of a two-part episode, Todd's 150 days is up, and with no gold (and just a few diamonds) he faces eviction. Despite a big clean-out, Parker modifies his plant to hit a million-dollar season. Dustin finally gets real mining equipment up to Cahoon Creek to see if it holds big gold.
78	13	"Fantasy Land"	January 24, 2014	4.34
Todd's claim owner forces a change to the mining plan. Grandpa visits Parker and makes a radical suggestion that the crew believes to be pure fantasy. Dustin fights to reach his first mountain gold.
79	14	"Medevac"	January 31, 2014	4.49
An emergency in the jungle forces Todd to airlift one of his men to safety. Tony Beets becomes furious when he finds that Parker has moved his whole operation over the creek. The Dakota boys may be forced to abandon their hole.
80	15	"Man on Wire"	February 14, 2014	3.76
Jack destroys the washplant, forcing Dave to find a new way to run their dirt. Frozen pay disrupts Parker's operation and threatens to end his season early. Dustin participates in a dangerous operation.
81	16	"Day of Reckoning"	February 21, 2014	3.74
Todd's claim owner arrives – unannounced – to take stock of the Hoffmans' operation. Dustin returns from the mountains just in time for the final clean-out. Unwilling to admit defeat, Parker uses a new piece of equipment to thaw his frozen pay dirt.
82	17	"Go Big or Go Home"	February 28, 2014	4.02
Parker Schnabel refuses to give up. He's not satisfied with his gold total and is dead set on bringing home big gold to his beloved grandfather. Nothing is going to stop him – not even the Klondike winter.
83	18	"Grandpa's Last Wish"	March 7, 2014	4.40
94-year-old John Schnabel convinces his grandsons Parker and Payson to return to Big Nugget to work together deep into the winter to prove, once and for all, that there is big gold buried deep under Smith Creek.
84	Special	"Unearthed"	March 14, 2014	3.46
This no-holds-barred show reveals how Fred coped with a dying wife, why a fateful choice cost Todd a huge amount of gold and how he coped with a murder in the jungle. A look forward reveals where the miners will be next season and who will return.

=== Season 5 (2014–2015) ===
No. in series	No. in season	Title	Original air date	U.S. viewers (millions)
85	Special	"Parker's Take"	August 19, 2014	1.54
86	Special	"Heroes and Zeroes"	August 19, 2014	1.19
A special episode looking forward to the show's fifth season, and the story of how a fateful choice cost Todd a huge amount of gold.
87	1	"New Blood"	October 17, 2014	3.59
Young Parker sets an outrageous season goal of 2,000 ounces, but struggles to strip new ground without his rock trucks- which are stranded miles from the claim due to bad roads. Tony Beets, The Viking, buys a 75-year-old gold-catching dredge, and plans to transport it to his claim and get gold this season; Todd Hoffman is left a broken man without a crew and with no plans to mine, but his father convinces him to travel back to the Yukon, where he strikes a deal on a new gold-rich claim.
88	2	"From the Ashes"	October 24, 2014	3.25
Todd and Jack struggle alone at McKinnon creek, working with just their old 400 excavator and a left behind loader, while Thurber transports their wash plant from Guyana to the claim. Tony nearly crushes his son beneath a conveyor, and Parker is forced to mine a swamp.
89	3	"Golden Boy"	October 31, 2014	3.57
Parker fights with his crew over running at night. Tony twists a vital steel frame on the dredge. Todd, Jack and Thurber tackle their first clean up, but disaster strikes when their only excavator is damaged beyond repair.
90	4	"Viking Ship"	November 7, 2014	3.56
Todd is forced to sell his gold to get a new loader and excavator, and convinces his old crew to return. Parker hauls his washplant across the claim and Tony takes to the skies to get from his claim to the gold dredge.
91	5	"Hard Bargain"	November 14, 2014	3.99
Dave agrees to work with the Hoffman crew under a new agreement, where he's an equal owner, and brings in 6 new massive machines. Tony has a near miss while removing the heaviest part of the dredge and Parker fights with Rick when he opens up untested ground.
92	6	"Cursed Cut"	November 21, 2014	3.78
Dave and Todd clash over how to mine frozen ground. Tony's daughter Monica gets stuck in a bad situation. Parker's hopes are drowned by multiple issues including a flooded cut.
93	7	"Goldzilla"	November 28, 2014	3.76
Todd needs to find a 100 ounce down payment to make a big purchase on one of the largest washplants in the klondike. Parker spends a quarter of a million dollars on new equipment. Tony attempts to remove the wheelhouse from his 75 year old gold dredge.
94	8	"Gold Blooded"	December 5, 2014	4.31
Parker goes for his best clean up so far this season, Tony attempts to rip the trommel out of his 75 year old gold dredge and the Hoffman crew is stunned by the death of an old crew member.
95	9	"Colossal Clean Up"	December 12, 2014	4.26
The Hoffmans overcome a lack of water to get a monster clean up. Tony finally gets his dredge on the way to its new home in Eureka Creek. Parker gets the biggest gold clean up in Gold Rush history.
96	Special	"Grandpa John"	December 19, 2014	4.42
This special explores the life of 94 year old John Schnabel. From the Kansas dustbowl, to his career on an Alaskan gold mine, Grandpa John continues to inspire his grandson Parker to follow in his footsteps.
97	10	"Parker's Accident"	January 2, 2015	4.44
Parker Schnabel totals his truck in a head-on collision. The Hoffman's rock trucks struggle to run on a sketchy haul road. Tony begins rebuilding his 75-year old dredge.
98	11	"Ship of Fools"	January 9, 2015	4.22
Parker and his grandpa begin the hunt for a new mining claim. Tony's crew runs out of bolts while re-building the dredge, and Todd suffers a huge financial loss.
99	12	"Piles of Gold"	January 16, 2015	4.57
Todd and Dave disagree about how to mine, but reap large rewards; Tony and Parker go to war over bedrock gold; Minnie steals Tony's dredge crew.
100	13	"Gold Road"	January 23, 2015	4.69
Logan has an accident with the rock truck; the Hoffman crew aims for a huge weigh-in; Parker finds his new cut frozen solid; Tony installs the heaviest part of his dredge.
101	14	"Rogue Miner"	January 30, 2015	4.59
Todd and Dave get bulldozers stuck in deep mud; Parker breaks an excavator; Parker's crew struggles with frozen ground; Tony rushes to finish the dredge.
102	15	"The Monster Lives"	February 6, 2015	4.63
Parker mines an island of paydirt; the Hoffman crew puts rock trucks out of commission; Tony finds an electrical problem.
103	16	"Rivers of Gold"	February 13, 2015	4.65
Parker diverts a creek in order to mine a pile of gold in the riverbed; Tony's crew is upset over fitting the tailings conveyor; Jack is accused of sabotage.
104	17	"Frozen Gold"	February 20, 2015	4.37
The Hoffmans' sluicebox is frozen; Tony tries to run his dredge, but discovers he's missing a part for his bucket line; equipment issues hinder Parker.
105	18	"Hundreds of Ounces"	February 27, 2015	4.47
The Hoffman crew tries to reach their season goal; Tony tries to run the gold dredge, but finds himself shipwrecked; Parker makes a push to hit his goal.
106	Special	"Freddy Dodge Returns"	February 27, 2015	3.98
Freddy and Derek Dodge search for gold in the Yukon wilderness; Freddy believes there is a hot spot around.
107	19	"Millions in Gold"	March 6, 2015	4.96
Parker faces mutiny; the Hoffmans get a large dozer; Tony makes one last attempt at getting the dredge working; Parker, Tony and Todd discuss the season.
108	Special	"The Whole Truth"	March 13, 2015	3.27
The miners discuss highs and lows, as well as conflicts and drama behind the scenes; Todd, Parker and Tony reveal plans for next season; a crew member calls it quits.

=== Season 6 (2015–2016) ===
No. in series	No. in season	Title	Original air date	U.S. viewers (millions)
109	Special	"5 Million Dollar Season"	October 9, 2015	1.43
110	1	"Blood, Sweat and Gold"	October 16, 2015	3.89
As a new mining season begins, Parker gets off to a disastrous start when he loses key crew and Tony orders him off his claim. Todd sets a massive goal for the season and Tony reveals big plans to expand his operation.
111	2	"Gold Ship"	October 23, 2015	3.51
A major issue brings Tony's dredge operation to a halt; Grandpa John is rushed to the hospital.
112	3	"Moving the Monster"	October 30, 2015	3.58
Todd encounters big issues as he attempts to move his 50 ton washplant. Tony's dredge finally starts producing gold. Parker piles on the pressure and it proves to be too much for one of his young crew members.
113	4	"Grandpa's Golden Advice"	November 6, 2015	3.52
Todd's attempt to deal with a mountain of tailings pits him against his son Hunter. Tony's dredge takes a hit as he puts a rookie winchman in the hot seat. Parker seeks advice from his Grandpa as he struggles to save his season.
114	5	"Jack's Gold Shack"	November 13, 2015	3.74
Parker takes his frustration out on his crew until his Grandpa gives him a much needed wake up call. Tony's crew battles over how to fix the bucket line on the dredge and Todd calls upon Freddy Dodge for help.
115	6	"Treasure Island"	November 20, 2015	3.50
Parker and his foreman Rick take a chance on a new cut. Todd searches for a fix so he can stop losing gold out of the sluicebox. Tony's crew hits a huge snag with the dredge.
116	7	"El Dorado Dream"	November 27, 2015	3.81
Jack gets to chase his dream at El Dorado, the richest documented creek in North America. Parker's crew pushes hard in attempt to have Treasure Island live up to its name. Tony discovers his dredge is pouring gold out of its sluices.
117	8	"Mammoth Channel"	December 4, 2015	4.00
The Hoffman crew uncovers a unique potential sign of good gold. Parker refuses to give up on Treasure Island and a fight between Tony and his crew spells the end for some of his crew.
118	9	"Mammoth Gold"	December 11, 2015	3.75
Todd's crew unearths evidence of a massive prehistoric creature that may or may not lead to big gold. Tony is forced to rebuild his washplant and Parker opens the biggest cut of his life in an attempt to get more gold than his rival Todd.
119	Special	"Parker Comes of Age"	December 11, 2015	2.38
A special episode that aired right after episode 9, it covers Parker's gold mining milestones.
120	10	"Parker's 21st"	December 18, 2015	3.78
It's Parker's 21st birthday and Rick has an awesome surprise waiting for him aboard a party barge. Tony seeks for a new investment.
121	11	"Captain Monica"	January 1, 2016	4.43
Monica covers Tony's dredging operation. Elsewhere, Parker attempts a large haul.
122	12	"Crew War"	January 8, 2016	4.13
Parker's new mechanic sparks a mutiny; a drought shuts down Todd's operation; and Tony faces a major issue that could put him out of business.
123	13	"Goldzilla Gold"	January 15, 2016	4.03
Hoffman deals with a feud between his day and night staff. Elsewhere, Tony and Gene have a disagreement about operations while Parker's wash plant is washing pay, but his team falls apart.
124	14	"Million Dollar Mountain"	January 22, 2016	4.56
Tony makes a big purchase. Parker and Todd wager on who will get the most gold, leading to big changes on the claims.
125	15	"Dead Even"	January 29, 2016	4.04
Parker pays his royalties for his 3000 ounce gold goal in advance. The dredge is stuck in his own tailings. Todd recovers his weekly loss by opening the roulette cut.
126	16	"Golden Bombshell"	February 5, 2016	3.93
Parker is convinced to re-open his Fantasyland cut. The power on Tony's 75-year-old dredge is upped to speed up production. Todd's Roulette cut provides both rewards and problems.
127	Special	"Klondike Legend"	February 12, 2016	3.58
Tony Beets travels back to his roots in the Netherlands where he reveals details about his transformation from a farm boy to a Klondike mining legend. Cameras also follow him in his offseason home in the desert.
128	17	"Oregon Gold"	February 19, 2016	3.85
Hoffman's looking for new mining ground in Oregon. Beets tries to find better ground for his dredge. Parker moves his washplant to other side of cut.
129	18	"Frozen Pay"	February 26, 2016	4.15
Parker must divert a creek and mine. Tony breaks his dredge buckets. Todd doubles down with a second monster washplant.
130	19	"King of the Klondike"	March 4, 2016	4.37
As the Klondike winter closes in, the final race for gold intensifies. Todd runs two massive washplants, Tony pushes to get his dredge out of the water before it freezes and Grandpa John arrives to find out if Parker has beaten his rival Todd.
131	Special	"Gold Hard Truth"	March 11, 2016	2.69
Season 2015 review and season 2016 preview.
132	Special	"Legends - Parker Schnabel"	March 18, 2016	1.29
133	Special	"Legends - Remembering Grandpa Schnabel"	March 25, 2016	N/A

=== Season 7 (2016–2017) ===
No. in series	No. in season	Title	Original air date	U.S. viewers (millions)
134	Special	"Legends - Remembering Grandpa Schnabel"	October 14, 2016	1.52
135	1	"Miracle on the Mountain"	October 14, 2016	2.85
In the 2-hr premiere Todd Hoffman takes the biggest gamble and turns his back on guaranteed gold in the Klondike. Tony Beets expands his empire, buying a huge second dredge. Parker Schnabel starts his new season without his grandfather and mentor.
136	2	"Eye in the Sky"	October 21, 2016	3.07
Todd Hoffman has his back against the wall when his new Oregon mine fails to deliver. Parker Schnabel's new $600,000 washplant breaks down on its first start-up and Tony Beets takes to the sky to check up on his children.
136	Special	"The Gambler"	October 28, 2016	1.11
137	3	"Frankenstein Machinery"	October 28, 2016	2.63
Todd returns to the Klondike to collect Monster Red while Parker confronts tough negotiator Tony over royalties and receives a shock offer which will change his season.
138	4	"Mutiny"	November 4, 2016	3.05
Todd finally finds good gold at his new High Bar mine. Parker gives his foreman Rick his own operation and when Tony and Minnie decide to cut the dredge crew's pay, a key crew member calls it quits.
139	5	"Misery on the Mountain"	November 11, 2016	3.03
Todd digs deep for 50 ounces to keep High Bar open, Tony enlists his kids to get Paradise Hill up and running, and human error at Scribner Creek costs Parker thousands in lost gold.
140	6	"No Crane, No Gain"	November 18, 2016	3.20
Todd Hoffman moves his whole operation; Parker Schnabel is flooded out; Tony Beets' ancient dredge hit over a million in gold.
141	7	"Watery Grave"	November 25, 2016	3.22
Tony arrives to find his million-dollar dredge in disaster. While Rick is at his grandpa's funeral, Parker shuts him down by taking his equipment, and the Hoffmans discover that their wash-plant doesn't work in their new mine.
142	8	"Mega Barge & Kid Commando"	December 2, 2016	3.29
Todd digs deeper than ever before in a desperate quest for gold; Tony heads down the Yukon River; and Parker's pricey wash-plant begins to shake apart.
143	9	"Record Gold"	December 9, 2016	3.60
Tony breaks records with the biggest gold haul in series history; Parker struggles to save his wash-plant; and Todd finally strikes gold after seven weeks at the Buckland.
144	10	"Go Down Fighting"	December 16, 2016	3.35
Todd Hoffman hits rock bottom when a key crew member quits; Tony Beets transforms some rusty relics into a monster power barge; a troubled Parker Schnabel misses his own birthday party.
145	Special	"Legends - Todd Hoffman"	December 23, 2016	N/A
146	11	"Game Over"	December 30, 2016	3.30
With no paycheck for five weeks, Todd Hoffman's close-knit team turn on each other. Parker's gamble to run his washplant without protection from rocks proves costly. Tony builds a $10,000 mega-trailer to move his barge – but gets his measurements wrong.
147	12	"Abandonment"	January 6, 2017	3.75
Todd struggles to continue mining after his crew quits; Parker recklessly damages his truck's air hoses while transporting the wash plant; and Tony discovers his dredge is blowing gold out of the sluices.
148	13	"Lifeline"	January 13, 2017	3.69
The remnants of the Hoffman crew reach their lowest point, but someone brings Todd good news; Tony Beets fires his barge captain, then runs aground up the mighty Yukon River; Rick Ness finally gets Parker Schnabel's second operation up and running.
149	14	"Parker vs. Rick"	January 20, 2017	3.42
Rick outperforms Parker on his new Indian River claim; Tony's dredge suffers a catastrophic failure, threatening his season; Todd Hoffman's skeleton crew finally sees good gold at their new mine in Colorado.
150	15	"Excavator Down"	January 27, 2017	3.86
Todd Hoffman eats humble pie when he begs his old crew to return, Parker Schnabel loses an excavator in a swamp and Tony Beets gives his daughter Monica her own operation.
151	16	"Double Trouble"	February 3, 2017	3.65
The Hoffman crew opens a second mine in Colorado, Parker tries out a new mechanic without Mitch's approval and Tony sets sail in a power-barge up the Yukon River.
152	17	"Cruelest Cut"	February 10, 2017	3.55
Circumstances force Parker Schnabel to call his dad in to help his struggling operation; Todd Hoffman has the best clean-up of the season; Tony Beets' daughter Monica starts bringing home the gold.
153	18	"Miners vs. Beavers"	February 17, 2017	3.42
Todd's whole operation is brought to a halt; Parker's plant move turns into an excavator nightmare and a massive fix means Tony can finally get his broken dredge up and running.
154	19	"Dredge vs. Washplant"	February 24, 2017	3.43
Todd finds monster nuggets on the top of a mountain, Parker and Rick struggle with a conveyor and Tony pits Monica against Kevin to see if the dredge is more efficient than a modern washplant.
155	20	"Viking Voyage"	March 3, 2017	3.65
Todd uses dynamite to blast monster boulders and get to the gold, Parker has to overcome a flood to get to a record gold count and Tony heads up the freezing Yukon River in his massive power barge.
156	21	"Final Fury"	March 10, 2017	3.56
As each crew attempts to hit their final goals, a fist fight on the Hoffman claim ends in a resignation; Tony's plan to relocate his dredge hits a brick wall; and Parker records the biggest gold weigh of his life and teases his next big adventure.
157	Special	"War and Peace"	March 17, 2017	2.19
The miners reveal the secrets of the gold mining season: the life and death issues on Parker's claim, how Tony Beets was defeated by a piece of paper and how a fight on the Hoffman claim brought about the end of a seven-year veteran.
158	Special	"The Legacy of John Schnabel"	March 31, 2017	1.66

=== Season 8 (2017–2018) ===
No. in series	No. in season	Title	Original air date	U.S. viewers (millions)
159	Special	"The Story So Far"	October 1, 2017	N/A
160	Special	"The 9 Million Dollar Season"	October 6, 2017	1.60
In an action packed look at Season 7 of Gold Rush Parker faced the tragic loss of his mentor Grandpa John and bet big on a $600,000 wash-plant to chase a record gold haul. Todd moved his entire operation to Oregon in search of a mountain of nugget.
161	Special	"Live Kickoff"	October 13, 2017	1.60
162	1	"Wagers and Wars (120 min)"	October 13, 2017	2.57
Parker and Todd go head to head as they lay down the exact same gold-weight goal for their season, whilst Tony Beets fires up his second ancient dredge.
163	2	"Blizzards and Bullets"	October 20, 2017	2.69
A rogue gunman fires shots at the Hoffman crew. Frozen ground destroys Parker Schnabel's dozers. Tony Beets starts to tear apart his 500 ton dredge.
164	3	"The Viking vs. the Mechanic"	October 27, 2017	2.49
Todd interferes with son Hunter's wash-plant, pushing their relationship to a breaking point; Parker battles to maneuver a 150 foot super conveyor; Tony desperately needs dredge number 1 to deliver gold, but frozen ice may derail his plans.
165	4	"The Curse of the Fairplay Mountains"	November 3, 2017	2.83
Todd races to construct a massive holding pond before a storm hits. Parker is furious that Ricks's failure to manage the cut has forced it to be shut down. Meanwhile, Tony undertakes a $600,000 upgrade of dredge #1 in an attempt to jump-start his season.
166	5	"Son Dethrones Father"	November 10, 2017	2.82
Parker Schnabel fights rising floodwaters to save his cut; Hunter Hoffman makes a bold decision shut down his operation and his father's. Tony Beets takes a convoy of military trucks on a treacherous journey to hunt down parts for his monster dredge.
167	6	"Colorado Strikes Back"	November 17, 2017	3.17
Todd shuts down his operations to support Freddy Dodge as he pleads with the county commissioners to allow him to mine his claim; Kevin has bad news.
168	7	"Inferno"	November 24, 2017	2.91
A massive forest fire tears through the Klondike toward Parker's claim, threatening to end his season; Tony desperately needs his barge to run.
169	8	"The Mighty Uppercut"	December 1, 2017	2.93
Todd is falling way short of his target and with his business struggling, he faces a tough ultimatum. Plus, Parker must move Sluicifer but is short on crew.
170	9	"Gold Bars and Hail Marys"	December 8, 2017	2.86
In Colorado, Todd's only hope for the season rests on a new claim, 'the jewellery box' - but has it already been mined out? And, Freddy drops a bombshell.
171	10	"The Devil's Finger"	December 15, 2017	2.93
Parker Schnabel is halfway through the season, but nowhere near halfway to his goal. Plus, Tony Beets is ready to barge the bucket line down the Yukon River.
172	11	"The Holy Grail"	December 22, 2017	2.94
Todd discovers a historic mine that could turn his season around and battles monster boulders to get to gold. Tony mounts a massive operation to replace a 24-ton bucket line and Parker's parents arrive for his birthday bearing extraordinary gifts.
173	Special	"Busted and Bushfixed"	December 29, 2017	2.01
To deliver incredible gold hauls, the miners have to keep the equipment running at all costs. The miners look back at the worst breakdowns and heroic fixes.
174	Special	"Trommels, Shaker Decks, Dredges and Derockers"	December 29, 2017	N/A
175	12	"Eclipsed"	January 5, 2018	2.85
Todd's Colorado mine is in the path of a rare solar eclipse, but he's in trouble with less than 800 ounces this season. Meanwhile, Rick has bad news for Parker.
176	13	"Lost Gold"	January 12, 2018	3.05
Hunter Hoffman makes a rookie mistake that causes dysfunction in the team. Tony Beets has to improvise to tear down his second dredge. Parker Schnabel risks damaging his washplant as he races to finish his last cut at Scribner Creek.
177	Special	"The Dakota Boys"	January 12, 2017	2.03
178	14	"The Father, The Son & The Holy Roller"	January 19, 2018	2.69
Parker Schnabel's opens a brand-new cut, but his crew gets stuck in the mud. Todd tries to get Hunter back on the team to assemble a new wash-plant and Tony's stuck up the creek without a barge.
179	15	"Broken"	January 26, 2018	2.84
Parker Schnabel takes on a massive wash-plant move on his own. Todd Hoffman races to set up new trommel and faces a medical emergency, while Tony Beets' daughter Monica makes a $200,000 mistake.
180	16	"Of Monsters and Men"	February 2, 2018	2.72
Parker threatens to shut down Rick's Indian River operation after production drops. Disaster strikes for Tony and Todd gives his crew a shock ultimatum.
181	Special	"Gold Rush: Parker v Beets"	February 9, 2018	2.16
The crew give a behind-the-scenes look at life on the road, showing they need to get the gold. And, there's a look back at the biggest payouts of gold, crab cash, and treasure. One-hour trailer for the Discovery Channel – low in content. With features from Moonshiners, Gold Divers and Deadliest Catch.
182	Special	"Gold Rush: Live"	February 16, 2018	1.92
183	17	"Planes, Cranes, and Virgin Claims"	February 16, 2018	2.69
Parker suspects Tony of sabotage on his new ground and confronts him. Todd's new washplant hits the noise limits for local regulations and they must find a bush fix to solve the problem. Tony Beets takes on his biggest challenge yet in tearing down his second dredge.
184	18	"King Kong"	February 23, 2018	2.85
Parker fulfils a life time ambition when he buys his first Klondike claim. Plus, Todd attempts to use chemical integrity to break a monster boulder that's in his path.
185	19	"Independence Day"	March 2, 2018	2.81
Tony's dredge teardown hits a wall when they attempt to remove the heaviest piece yet. Todd's son, Hunter demands a change of mine site if they're going to have a future. Parker makes a bid for independence on his own claim, but Tony stands in his way.
186	20	"The Spoils of War"	March 9, 2018	3.14
It's judgement day on Parker and Todd's 100-ounce bet. Parker chases a record breaking 7.2 million dollar season total. Todd desperately tries to stop his crew from falling apart. Tony struggles to get his dredge to Dawson before the Yukon River freezes.
187	Special	"Win Big or Die Trying"	March 16, 2018	1.61
After a record breaking season, sit down with Parker Schnabel and Tony Beets as they discuss the biggest moments from this past season of Gold Rush.
188	Special	"American Dreamer"	March 16, 2018	1.78
Todd Hoffman sits down to discuss his past eight seasons on Gold Rush and what his exciting next chapter will be.
189	Special	"600 Mile Freeze"	March 24, 2018	N/A

=== Season 9 (2018–2019) ===
No. overall	No. in season	Title	Original release date	U.S. viewers (millions)
190	Special	"Disastrous Breakdowns"	September 21, 2018	N/A
191	Special	"End of an Era"	October 5, 2018	0.67
192	1	"Declaration of Independence"	October 12, 2018	2.35
New mine boss Rick gathers together his crew of greenhorns and arrives in the Yukon ready to start his season. Parker and Tony face off over royalties and land access in a confrontation that threatens to end one of their seasons before it's even begun.
193	2	"Smoked Out"	October 19, 2018	2.27
Rick faces mutiny from his crew of greenhorns. Parker visits his parents for advice and makes a decision that affects the rest of his season. Tony's barge hits trouble on its way back to Dawson to finally begin the rebuild of his second monster dredge.
194	Special	"The Rise of Rick Ness"	October 19, 2018	1.46
195	3	"Gods and Monsters"	October 26, 2018	2.23
Rick hunts for a new washplant with his crew. With Parker's ground frozen he must find a way to mine the gold to pay his deposit to Tony. Tony orders son Kevin to train up a new dredgemaster, but a vital piece gets damaged and brings them to a halt.
196	Special	"The Legend of Dozer Dave"	October 26, 2018	1.46
197	4	"Durt Reynolds"	November 2, 2018	2.16
Disaster strikes when Rick fires up his washplant for the first time. Parker tries a risky plan to keep the gold coming in and must choose a new foreman.
198	5	"The Return of Freddy Dodge"	November 9, 2018	2.44
To save his season, Rick drafts a Gold Rush vet and former member of team Hoffman. Chasing a record-breaking goal, Parker orders an unachievable goal. Tony and Monica fire up their wash plant as they battle to beat Parker to the gold.
199	6	"Hoffman's Ghosts"	November 16, 2018	2.38
New mine boss Rick is buckling under debt, if he's going to prove himself to his crew he needs to get his first gold weigh. Parker attempts a treacherous river crossing and Tony Beets hits a snag removing a massive piece of his million-dollar dredge.
200	7	"Hazard Pay"	November 23, 2018	2.35
Rick needs a quick fix from Freddy Dodge to keep his season on track. Parker races to get his second wash plant running, but struggles. Tony needs to re-float his sunken dredge and turns to a familiar face from the Hoffman crew for a solution.
201	8	"Stormageddon"	November 30, 2018	2.50
Torrential rains hit the Klondike and Parker and Rick battle to save their mining operations from being flooded out. Tony sends son Mike on his first voyage as Captain on his tug the Kid Commando.
202	9	"Megamorphosis"	December 5, 2018	1.72
Parker battles to save his season when his biggest wash plant collapses. Rick makes a shocking discovery about his gold mining claim and turns to his dad for help. Tony races to finish dismantling his dredge but a crucial piece comes crashing down.
203	10	"Father's Day"	December 14, 2018	2.63
Rick Ness and his Dad, Rick Senior, battle together to open a new cut. Parker is struggling with mechanical breakdowns and one of his crew suffers a terrible injury. Tony races to dismantle the final sections of his million-dollar Dredge.
204	11	"The Resurrection"	December 21, 2018	2.57
The flu brings Parker's operation to its knees, and it's up to foreman Dean to keep the claim running; Rick's mechanic, Carl, behaves strangely and reveals shocking news; Tony hits rock bottom as his entire operation grinds to a halt.
205	12	"The Devil's Deadline"	January 4, 2019	2.44
A desperate Rick is forced to ask Tony for help. Tony hauls the final piece of his million-dollar second dredge from Thistle Creek and prepares to rebuild it.
206	13	"Sucker Punch"	January 11, 2019	2.64
Rick discovers he's been losing gold after Freddy Dodge points out a big flaw in his washplant. With his excavator down, Parker risks moving his washplant with a dozer.
207	14	"Old School Heroes"	January 18, 2019	2.56
Parker leaves Brennan in charge of one section of the mine, with mixed results. Meanwhile, Rick damages his water pipe with some careless excavation work.
208	15	"Wedding Bells & Emergency Operations"	January 25, 2019	2.67
Parker tasks Brennan with moving wash plant Big Red in just 24 hours. Rick's crew struggles when someone falls prey to a life threatening illness. Wedding bells ring in the Yukon as the Beets family readies for the marriage of Tony's daughter Monica.
209	16	"Broken Bones"	February 1, 2019	2.81
Parker crashes a jet boat resulting in a terrible injury. Frozen ground and machinery breakdowns threaten Rick's season. Its all hands on deck as Tony and family finally start to rebuild his million-dollar second dredge.
210	Special	"Gold Gurus"	February 8, 2019	2.44
Experts step in to help the miners of Gold Rush with technology, ingenuity and mechanical innovation to find the most prized element in human history.
211	17	"Make It Rain"	February 15, 2019	2.67
Desperate Parker pushes wash plant Sluicifer beyond the limit; Tony attempts a dangerous crane operation.
212	18	"Big Red Is Dead"	February 22, 2019	2.67
Parker closes in on his $7.2 million target, but wash plant Big Red runs out of pay dirt; Rick strives to reach his goal.
213	Special	"Grandpa John's Legacy"	March 1, 2019	N/A
199	19	"Cold War"	March 1, 2019	2.70
Parker's parents visit and offer help; Rick continues to battle frozen ground to reach his goal; shocking news forces Tony to make a drastic decision about his season
214	20	"Brace for Impact"	March 8, 2019	2.72
Rick and crew fight to get as much gold as possible before they're shut down; Tony races to finish his second dredge; Parker makes the riskiest move of the season.
215	21	"Fire and Ice"	March 15, 2019	2.60
While on target for an $8.4-million-dollar season, Parker's wash plant catches fire; Rick and his crew finish strong; Tony heads into the wilderness to find lost equipment and attempts to get his ancient dredge up and running.
216	Special	"Finale Aftershow"	March 15, 2019	2.01
217	Special	"Three Sides to Every Story"	March 22, 2019	1.89
Parker Schnabel, Rick Ness and Tony Beets sit down to discuss the biggest moments from this past season of "Gold Rush"; The Dakota Boys reflect on their wild season and look ahead to what's next.

=== Season 10 (2019–2020) ===
No. overall	No. in season	Title	Original release date	U.S. viewers (millions)
218	Special	"Back to the Future"	September 24, 2019	0.88
219	Special	"No Guts, No Gold"	October 4, 2019	0.79
220	Special	"15 Million Dollar Season"	October 11, 2019	0.98
221	1	"Crisis in the Klondike"	October 11, 2019	2.09
A crisis in the Klondike forces Parker, Rick & Tony to take massive gambles to strike it rich and hunt for gold on new grounds. The setback hits just as the price of gold spikes, sparking a new gold rush to the area.
222	2	"A New Rush Begins"	October 18, 2019	2.11
Parker bets millions on his crew sluicing in record time and is forced to make a hard decision when things don't go as planned. Rick rushes to fire up his washplant and find big nuggets. A showdown on the Indian River sends a Klondike legend scrambling.
223	3	"The Nugget Hunter"	October 25, 2019	2.08
Rick and his dad fly high into Keno mountains on a treasure hunt for massive nuggets. Tony and Monica investigate a gold hot spot the old dredges may have missed. Parker makes a big decision about his crew that could determine the fate of his season.
224	Special	"You Can't Stop The Beets"	October 25, 2019	1.43
Tony and his family spend time together looking back through the successes and failures from their year's mining for gold. Tony assesses which of his kids might take over one day.
225	4	"Leave No Gold Behind"	November 1, 2019	2.48
Parker second guesses the ground he's mining and questions his new foremen. Tony Beets makes a big decision to move the family's entire operation. Rick's mechanic arrives at a critical moment.
226	5	"We're Gonna Need A Bigger Bucket"	November 8, 2019	2.32
Parker throws down a huge engineering challenge to his team. Rick decides to make a major upgrade to his operation. Mike and Monica Beets team up to open more ground.
227	6	"Monster Red Lives"	November 15, 2019	2.26
In search of big nuggets, Rick buys a monster washplant. A flood puts Tony Beets new claim into jeopardy. Parker needs to move Big Red in record time to get back on the gold.
228	7	"Motherlode Mountain"	November 22, 2019	2.42
The Beets discover what could be the motherlode. Rick faces an impossible decision: mine gold or put together his new washplant. Parker tests his new co-foreman with the claim's most important machine.
229	8	"Washplant Wars"	November 29, 2019	2.45
Rick races to get Monster Red running after losing his only way to mine gold. A dangerous storm shuts down Parker's operation. The Beets family push to get Monica's potentially gold-rich cut up and running.
230	9	"No Time For Redemption"	December 6, 2019	2.29
Tensions rise when Parker introduces a new crewmember and a radical plan. The Beets Family run an important test on daughter Monica's Hunker Creek claim that could make or break their season. Rick calls on Freddy Dodge to fix Monster Red.
231	10	"When the Levee Breaks"	December 13, 2019	2.27
Rick's season hangs in the balance when an engineering disaster shuts him down. Parker sinks a ton of money into a new claim. Tony gets a third operation running.
232	11	"Rise of the Machines"	December 20, 2019	2.55
Rick tries to outsmart a vital piece of equipment that has a mind of its own. Parker splurges on a brand new toy to get more gold. The Beets bring in a hired gun to turn around the season.
233	Special	"Back to the Future"	December 27, 2019	N/A
234	12	"Million-Dollar Pay Day"	January 3, 2020	2.56
Parker gambles big and splits his crew in search of a massive score. Rick calls in Gene Cheeseman to save his season. The Beets move heaven and earth to get all three kids bringing in gold.
235	13	"Nuggets or Bust"	January 10, 2020	2.28
Rick brings in a secret weapon in his hunt for bug nuggets. Tony's confronted with a catastrophic issue at his settling pond. Parker makes a risky decision when he hires a friend with no mining experience to help the crew get ahead.
236	14	"Cornered"	January 17, 2020	2.58
After pulling the plug on his operation, Rick is thrown a lifeline that will determine the rest of his mining season. Parker and Tony battle frozen paydirt.
237	15	"And Then There Was One"	January 24, 2020	2.16
The mining season is nearly over, and Rick Ness and his crew are making up for lost time. Plus, Tony goes off the beaten track in his search for gold.
238	16	"Parker Doubles Down"	January 31, 2020	2.35
Parker makes a big move to double his output and bring in more gold. The Beets' face catastrophe when their only remaining operation grinds to a halt. Just as Rick gets Monster Red dialed in, huge rocks threaten to shut him down for good.
239	17	"Rebellion At Duncan Creek"	February 7, 2020	2.21
A machine failure leads to an explosive uprising on Rick's claim. Parker's crew races to build a mountain of pay dirt. Tony decides to run 24/7 to increase his gold total.
240	18	"Frozen Treasure"	February 14, 2020	2.03
Monica races to run newly thawed paydirt that could save the season. Parker constructs a mega pond to keep his operation running. Rick troubleshoots a problem with his wash plant and gears up to end his season strong.
241	19	"Bring In The Big Guns"	February 21, 2020	2.49
Rick confronts his landowners. Tony makes a massive purchase. Parker searches for new ground.
242	20	"Rally In The Valley"	February 28, 2020	2.12
Rick hits a gold layer that may save his season. Parker's crew take big risks in Death Valley. Tony turns a corner.
243	21	"Last Gold"	March 6, 2020	2.53
At the end of his season Parker closes in on a record gold total. Rick rolls the dice on a new piece of ground. Tony turns to Hunter Creek for a final score.
244	Special	"Gold Rush: Rick's Rally"	May 1, 2020	1.17
245	Special	"Aussie Gold Strike"	May 8, 2020	1.11
246	Special	"The Road to 70 Million"	May 8, 2020	0.89
247	Special	"Shutdown, But Not Out"	June 5, 2020	0.82

=== Season 11 (2020–2021) ===
No. overall	No. in season	Title	Original release date	U.S. viewers (millions)
248	Special	"Confessions of a Record-Breaking Season"	October 16, 2020	1.00
249	Special	"New Season Sneak Peek"	October 21, 2020	N/A
250	1	"The Perfect Storm"	October 23, 2020	2.05
As gold prices spike to record highs and the cost of fuel plummets, Parker, Rick and Tony race to take advantage of the perfect conditions. But after the worldwide lockdown delayed the start of the season, there's less time than ever to cash in.
251	2	"Promised Land"	October 30, 2020	2.01
Parker expands to a second cut and puts his trust in a rookie foreman. Tony battles the cursed cut. Rick fires up his plant on rich ground. Greenhorn Fred Lewis calls in a mining legend.
252	Special	"Paydirt Playbook"	October 30, 2020	1.07
253	3	"The Fast and the Furious"	November 6, 2020	2.27
Parker's new strategy to build a war chest creates an engineering challenge, igniting a flare up with his foremen. Rick pulls in his first gold of the season. Fred calls in reinforcements.
254	4	"Breaking the Piggy Bank"	November 13, 2020	2.27
Parker's crew works double-time hoping for a big payoff while Tony gambles on a hidden strip of paydirt. Later, Rick struggles to keep his small crew working.
255	5	"It's Alive"	November 20, 2020	2.21
Rick bets nearly all his gold on a new machine that could transform his operation. Tony resurrects an abandoned secret weapon. Parker hires new crew members to make up for lost time.
256	6	"Big Red vs. Sluicifer"	November 27, 2020	2.33
Competition erupts on Parker's teams, Tony finds lost gold and vets return.
257	7	"Rick's Sixth Sense"	December 4, 2020	2.39
Rick risks his season on a hunch that he's discovered a new hot spot. Tony mobilises an arsenal to cash in on lost gold. Fred's veteran crew fight old equipment.
258	8	"Lost Gold of Paradise Hill"	December 11, 2020	2.33
Tony fires up another plant to haul in gold left behind by the old-timers.
259	9	"Back to Alaska"	December 18, 2020	2.28
Parker returns to Alaska to prospect new ground and expand his empire. Rick digs deep for big gold in a cut he hopes will deliver the biggest weigh in of the season. Fred's crew member Johnny comes up with unique fix to their water problem.
260	10	"Record Breaker"	January 1, 2021	1.95
Parker returns to the Klondike and records the biggest gold haul of his career. Tony travels deep into the wilderness to resurrect a gold-catching monster. Rick's forced to find better ground. Fred makes a big change to get on the gold.
261	11	"Frenemies"	January 8, 2021	2.33
Parker brokers a deal with Tony to open a new cut on the Indian River.
262	12	"Resurrecting Monsters"	January 15, 2021	2.19
Rick turns back to Monster Red with hopes of earning a record season.
263	13	"Got Your Six"	January 22, 2021	2.22
Tony cleans up big, Fred's team begins to crack and Rick leaves his crew.
264	14	"Freddy To The Rescue"	January 29, 2021	2.21
Freddy and Juan answer an SOS call and Parker's crew tallies up their gold.
265	15	"The Viking Detective"	February 5, 2021	2.05
Tony uncovers a secret patch of gold-rich ground at Paradise HIll.
266	16	"No Questions Asked"	February 12, 2021	2.05
Parker's co-foreman abruptly leaves. Fred opens a promising new cut.
267	17	"Growing Pains"	February 19, 2021	2.23
Rick loses a key crew member. Fred's team works through the night.
268	Special	"Show Me the Gold"	February 19, 2021	0.81
269	18	"The $6 Million Cut"	February 26, 2021	2.15
Tony taps out the Megacut. Parker's operation depends on one man.
270	Special	"Band of Brothers"	February 26, 2021	0.76
271	19	"Clear Eyes, Full Pans"	March 5, 2021	2.08
Ricks finds a monster nugget. Parker confronts Brennan.
272	20	"Attack or Retreat"	March 12, 2021	2.04
Fred faces a big decision; Rick hits the jackpot; Parker's team stumbles.
273	21	"Endgame"	March 19, 2021	1.94
The miners race to haul in big gold before winter freezes them out.

=== Winter's Fortune (2021) ===
No. overall	No. in season	Title	Original release date	U.S. viewers (millions)
274	1	"The Race Starts Now"	July 30, 2021	1.06
275	2	"Mine is Bigger"	August 6, 2021	0.88
276	3	"Force of Nature"	August 13, 2021	1.18
277	4	"Gold Moves"	August 20, 2021	1.12
278	5	"The Klondike Beast"	August 27, 2021	1.09
279	6	"Trapped"	September 3, 2021	1.29
280	7	"All the Answers"	September 10, 2021	1.25
281	8	"Into the Breach"	September 10, 2021	1.34

=== Season 12 (2021–2022) ===
No. overall	No. in season	Title	Original release date	U.S. viewers (millions)
282	Special	"Against All Odds"	September 17, 2021	0.78
283	1	"Ground War"	September 24, 2021	1.52
A battle breaks out to secure and mine the best ground.
284	Special	"The Kid Vs. The King"	September 24, 2021	0.83
285	2	"Battle of the Greenhorns"	October 1, 2021	1.49
Parker brings in his first gold; Fred tracks down a hot lead.
286	Special	"Klondike Kingpins"	October 1, 2021	0.76
287	3	"Crash and Berm"	October 8, 2021	1.50
Parker’s team battles a torrent of water. Rick rescues a rookie miner.
288	Special	"Madmax or Madman"	October 8, 2021	1.12
289	4	"$9 Million Mistake"	October 15, 2021	1.60
Tony suffers a major setback; Parker's team stalls; Fred finds gold.
290	5	"Crank It To 11"	October 22, 2021	1.60
Parker fuels a gamble, Fred risks shutdown and Rick looks for new ground.
291	6	"The Hunker Creek Curse"	October 29, 2021	1.55
Tony fights the cursed cut; Rick tests Brennan; Fred bets on a new plant.
292	7	"Family Matters"	November 5, 2021	1.20
Parker's quick score; Monica returns to rescue Tony: Fred hauls in a plant.
293	8	"The King's Gambit"	November 12, 2021	1.76
Parker hatches a plan; Tony struggles at 80 Pup; Rick taps a new recruit.
294	9	"Saving Rick's Bacon"	November 19, 2021	1.62
Rick's wash plant Rocky disintegrates in front of his own eyes.
295	10	"The Vindication"	November 26, 2021	1.58
Fred kicks off his first week of sluicing and a critical first gold weigh.
296	11	"A New Glory Hole"	December 3, 2021	1.80
Parker's crew clocks in their first double-gold weigh of the year.
297	12	"Robbing Parker to Pay Parker"	December 10, 2021	1.78
Parker does the unthinkable to get down to gold at Mud Mountain.
298	13	"Balls on the Table"	December 17, 2021	1.80
Rick chases a vein of gold-rich paydirt that's bankrupted other miners.
299	14	"Little Eldorado"	January 7, 2022	1.77
Parker gambles 100 ounces to prospect Little Eldorado Creek in Alaska.
300	15	"The Secret Pay Layer"	January 14, 2022	1.77
Parker gets a lead on virgin ground at Cleary Creek in Alaska.
301	16	"The $4 Million Question"	January 21, 2022	1.86
Parker finally runs paydirt and weighs his first gold from Mud Mountain.
302	17	"Bonus Gold"	January 28, 2022	1.82
Rick strikes a pay layer and Fred's team suffers a devastating setback.
303	Special	"Ends of the Earth"	February 4, 2022	N/A
304	18	"Rebirth of Monster Red"	February 11, 2022	1.60
Rick soups up Monster Red. Fred fights a flood to stay on the gold.
305	19	"Gold At Last"	February 18, 2022	1.65
Parker risks destroying Big Red to finally find Mud Mountain’s big gold.
306	20	"The Alliance"	February 25, 2022	1.64
Fred forms an unexpected partnership to double his gold.
307	21	"Whatever It Takes"	March 4, 2022	1.68
Rick calls in his secret weapon; Parker splurges.
308	22	"Rally Valley Bonanza"	March 11, 2022	1.72
Rick finally hits the rich pay layer; Tony prospects new ground in Keno.
309	23	"Seeing Red"	March 18, 2022	1.59
Parker's team cripples Big Red while hauling in gold-rich Mud Mountain pay.
310	24	"Buckets Full of Gold"	March 25, 2022	1.63
Parker gambles on another record and Rick shoots for another personal best.

=== Season 13 (2022–2023) ===
No. overall	No. in season	Title	Original release date	U.S. viewers (millions)
311	Special	"Fortune Favors the Bold"	September 9, 2022	0.56
312	Special	"Rick Ness Comes Clean"	September 16, 2022	0.78
313	Special	"Ground Wars"	September 23, 2022	0.72
314	1	"A Seismic Shift"	September 30, 2022	1.38
Parker bites off more than he can chew when he brokers a big deal.
315	2	"Searching for Rick Ness"	October 7, 2022	1.33
Parker gets devastating news and Rick Ness surfaces.
316	3	"Golden Acres"	October 14, 2022	1.33
Parker gambles on shutting down his operation to bank big gold.
317	4	"Trench Warfare"	October 21, 2022	1.25
Tony battles to save his cuts when snow melt swamps Paradise Hill.
318	5	"Cheat Codes"	October 28, 2022	1.15
Tony uses an excavator cheat code to bus through permafrost.
319	6	"Fight Iron with Iron"	November 4, 2022	1.37
Parker fights muddy ground as he opens his biggest cut of the season.
320	7	"Valley of Prayers"	November 11, 2022	1.37
Parker and Sluicifer tackle the Bear Cut. Fred faces financial ruin.
321	8	"50,000 Ounces"	November 18, 2022	1.48
Parker hauls Big Red into the massive Bear Cut.
322	9	"Cursed"	November 25, 2022	1.40
Parker tasks Mitch with mining out an old road built on virgin ground.
323	10	"Little Red Rocket"	December 2, 2022	1.30
Parker sets out to find a wash plant and kickstart the Alaska operation.
324	11	"Tony's Golden Nights"	December 9, 2022	1.40
Tony gambles on a crop of greenhorns to work the night shift.
325	12	"FUBAR"	December 16, 2022	1.52
Parker opens the first cut on his Alaskan claim.
326	13	"Parker's Big Payday"	December 30, 2022	1.34
Parker's crew tear through Klondike ground.
327	14	"Who's the Boss"	January 6, 2023	1.40
With Parker in Alaska, Tyson brings in new recruits to get back on gold.
328	Special	"Biggest Gold Weighs"	January 6, 2023	0.88
329	15	"The Last Frontier"	January 13, 2023	1.52
Parker battles for his first Alaska gold and a triple clean out.
330	16	"Gremlins"	January 20, 2023	1.53
Parker's crew is hit with a series of mysterious breakdowns.
331	17	"Mammoth Mess"	January 27, 2023	1.43
Tony makes a mammoth discovery, while Parker faces a flooded cut.
332	18	"Buzzified"	February 3, 2023	1.41
Tensions rise between Fred and the Clayton Brothers.
333	19	"Big Toys, Big Problems"	February 10, 2023	1.35
Tony pivots to the 80 Pup cut but a water pump failure stops him cold.
334	20	"Washed Out"	February 17, 2023	1.31
Parker gets down to paydirt at the Wolf Cut but disaster strikes.
335	21	"Trial by Parker"	February 24, 2023	1.43
Parker visits Fred's claim and delivers a devastating verdict.
336	22	"The Alaska Verdict"	March 3, 2023	1.33
Parker battles a massive flood and weighs his first gold from Alaska.
337	23	"Here's Johnny!"	March 10, 2023	1.37
Tensions rise when Fred brings in an old friend.
338	24	"Runway to Redemption"	March 17, 2023	1.26
Parker drops a bombshell on the Klondike crew to make up for Alaska.
339	25	"Panama Canal Jackpot"	March 24, 2023	1.27
Parker pushes for a record season and Tony resurrects a 30-year-old beast.
340	26	"Klondike Climax"	March 31, 2023	1.41
Parker pivots to the Panama Canal cut and the Beets find a glory hole.

=== Season 14 (2023–2024) ===
No. overall	No. in season	Title	Original release date	U.S. viewers (millions)
341	Special	"Parker Tells All"	September 22, 2023	N/A
342	Special	"24 Million In Gold"	September 22, 2023	N/A
343	Special	"Gold Rush Sneak Peek"	September 27, 2023	N/A
344	Special	"The Early Years"	September 29, 2023	N/A
345	1	"The 160 Million Gamble"	September 29, 2023	N/A
Parker debates going all-in on a claim that could pay out $160 million.
346	2	"Call of the Indian River"	October 6, 2023	N/A
Tony debates moving his entire family operation to the Indian River.
347	3	"Hey Parker, It's Rick"	October 13, 2023	N/A
Years of silence come to an end when Rick visits Parker for a favor.
348	4	"Free Agent"	October 20, 2023	N/A
Facing bankruptcy, Parker turns to an old honey hole for new gold.
349	5	"Up in Smoke"	October 27, 2023	N/A
Rick's vital water pump goes up in smoke, putting his season at risk.
350	6	"Down, but Not Out"	November 3, 2023	N/A
To save his comeback, Rick tries to make a season-saving deal with Tony.
351	7	"50 Ounce Ultimatum"	November 10, 2023	N/A
Rick's landlord demands 50 ounces of gold by the end of the week.
352	8	"Last Ditch Gold"	November 18, 2023	N/A
Parker goes ditch digging on his Dominion Creek claim.
353	9	"Pivot!"	November 24, 2023	N/A
Rick's season is all riding on a move to the new Bacon Strip cut.
354	10	"Parker's Runaway Claim"	December 1, 2023	N/A
Parker's thirst for gold pushes him to open a third claim.
355	11	"Frankendozer"	December 8, 2023	N/A
Parker cannibalizes multiple machines to build a "Frankendozer."
356	12	"Money Pit Payday"	December 15, 2023	N/A
Parker battles to bring in his first Money Pit gold at Dominion Creek.
357	13	"Parker Comes Alive"	December 22, 2023	N/A
A mysterious gold loss could set Parker back.
358	14	"Desperate Cry for Help"	December 29, 2023	N/A
Tony's son Kevin returns to help save the family business.
359	Special	"When Mining Goes Wrong"	December 29, 2023	N/A
360	15	"Succession"	January 5, 2024	N/A
The Beets family implodes trying to get the Paradise Hill trommel running.
361	16	"Ring of Fire"	January 12, 2024	N/A
A Parker crew member melts down. The McCaughans set their trommel on fire.
362	17	"Moneyball"	January 19, 2024	N/A
Parker closes in on his goal, but an emergency threatens his momentum.
363	18	"Parker's New Toy"	January 26, 2024	1.64
Parker brings in a new wash plant to push him past 5,000 ounces.
364	19	"Off the Rails"	February 2, 2024	1.43
Rick's crew sends a rock truck careening off the road.
365	20	"Waking the Beast"	February 9, 2024	1.64
Tony tries to resurrect his infamous Dredge #1
366	21	"Rally Valley or Bust"	February 16, 2024	1.65
Rick bets his season on firing up Monster Red.
367	22	"The Money Pit Fights Back"	February 23, 2024	1.52
Parker's crew accidentally unleashes a flood of water that wreaks havoc.
368	23	"Winter's Reckoning"	March 1, 2024	1.49
Rick battles freezing equipment in his final bid for a comeback.

=== Season 15 (2024–2025) ===
No. overall	No. in season	Title	Original release date	U.S. viewers (millions)
369	Special	"When It All Changes"	November 1, 2024	0.72
370	Special	"The Beets Dynasty"	November 1, 2024	0.62
371	Special	"Sneak Peek"	November 6, 2024	N/A
372	1	"Greed Is Good"	November 8, 2024	1.01
373	Special	"Miners vs Mother Nature"	November 8, 2024	0.47
374	2	"My Father's Frenemy"	November 15, 2024	0.99
375	3	"Quicksand"	November 22, 2024	1.11
376	4	"The Disappearing Pay Layer"	November 29, 2024	0.98
377	5	"On Thick Ice"	December 6, 2024	1.12
378	6	"Come Nuggets or High Water"	December 13, 2024	1.22
379	7	"Brother vs. Cousin"	December 20, 2024	1.22
380	Special	"Expansion Mode"	December 27, 2024	1.13
381	8	"Flood of Emotions"	January 3, 2025	1.12
382	9	"Rally Valleys Last Bounty"	January 3, 2025	1.11
383	10	"Parker's Three Plant Blitz"	January 10, 2025	1.15
384	11	"Big Cat Fight"	January 17, 2025	1.21
385	Special	"Its Good To Be King"	January 17, 2025	1.05
386	12	"Kevin Fires Up"	January 24, 2025	1.28
388	13	"The King's Mistake"	January 31, 2025	1.12
389	14	"Parker's Bombshell"	February 7, 2025	1.16
390	15	"Vegas, Baby!"	February 14, 2025	1.18
391	16	"The Thin Red Pay Layer"	February 21, 2025	1.19
392	17	"Rogue Foreman"	February 28, 2025	1.05
393	18	"Rick vs. Buzz"	March 7, 2025	1.26
394	19	"Another Man's Treasure"	March 14, 2025	1.05
395	Special	"Mine Boss for the Day"	March 21, 2025	0.94
396	Special	"Big Man, Tiny Excavator"	March 28, 2025	0.81
397	Special	"Worth Their Weight In Gold"	March 28, 2025	0.60
398	20	"Dredge Baby Dredge"	April 4, 2025	1.01
399	21	"Vegas Valley Verdict"	April 4, 2025	1.01
400	22	"Parker Heats Up"	April 11, 2025	1.04
401	Special	"The Man In The Gold Room"	April 11, 2025	0.70
402	23	"The Last Dance"	April 18, 2025	0.90

=== Season 16 (2025–2026) ===
No. overall	No. in season	Title	Original release date	U.S. viewers (millions)
403	1	"Records Will be Broken"	November 7, 2025	N/A
404	2	"Eager Beavers"	November 14, 2025	N/A
405	3	"Rick's Bold Call"	November 21, 2025	N/A
406	4	"Buzz in the Hills"	November 28, 2025	N/A
407	5	"Pick Me Someone to Fire"	December 5, 2025	N/A
408	6	"The Weasel"	December 12, 2025	N/A
409	7	"Surprise Fortunes"	December 19, 2025	N/A
410	Special	"No Off Days"	December 26, 2025	N/A
411	8	"Parker Comes Calling"	January 2, 2026	N/A
412	9	"Playing With Fire"	January 9, 2026	N/A
413	10	"New Levels of Chaos"	January 16, 2026	N/A
414	11	"Cleaning Up in Vegas"	January 23, 2026	N/A
415	12	"On Shaky Ground"	January 30, 2026	N/A
416	Special	"The King of Keno"	February 6, 2026	N/A
417	13	"Valhalla or Bust"	February 13, 2026	N/A
418	14	"The Defectors"	February 20, 2026	N/A
419	15	"Trommel Around and Find Out"	February 27, 2026	N/A
420	16	"The Silence of the Sluice"	March 6, 2026	N/A
421	17	"Rick's Mess"	March 13, 2026	N/A
422	Special	"Like Brother, Like Brother"	March 20, 2026	N/A
423	18	"Golden Goose, Wounded Moose"	March 27, 2026	N/A
424	19	"Dig Deep or Cash Out"	April 3, 2026	N/A
425	20	"Musical Washplants"	April 10, 2026	N/A
426	21	"1,000-Ounce Week"	April 17, 2026	N/A
427	22	"The Gold Ceiling"	April 24, 2026	N/A
428	23	"Klondike Shoot-Out"	May 1, 2026	N/A

=== Season 17 (2026–2027) ===
No. overall	No. in season	Title	Original release date	U.S. viewers (millions)
429	1	"The Most Gold Wins"	October 2, 2026	N/A
430	2	"A Midas Mess"	October 9, 2026	N/A
431	3	"Diagnosing Rick"	October 16, 2026	N/A
432	4	"Keno City Conclave"	October 23, 2026	N/A
433	5	"Low-Grade Panic"	October 30, 2026	TBD
434	6	"Rivers of Gold"	November 6, 2026	TBD
435	7	"Black Gold"	November 13, 2026	TBD
436	8	"Carrying Parker's Water"	November 20, 2026	TBD
