= Space Station Simulator =

1998 video game

- Developer: Maris Multimedia
- Publishers: Maris Multimedia, Focus Multimedia (UK), Piranha Interactive Publishing
- Platform: Windows
- Release: May 17, 1998
- Genre: Educational video game
- Mode: Single-player

Space Station Simulator, later renamed Skybase, is an educational video game developed by UK-based studio Maris Multimedia and published by Maris Multimedia, Focus Multimedia in the United Kingdom, and, under the Skybase name, Piranha Interactive Publishing. It was released on May 17, 1998. The game allows the player to build a realistic space station of their own design using various International Space Station modules designed by the space agencies of countries around the world while learning more about each module. The player can then simulate the launch of the modules, and view the station from both inside and outside. While the game was positively received by reviewers for its graphics and educational value, it was criticized for a lack of interactivity when the space station is actually built.

== Gameplay ==
The game proceeds in three phases: the player designs and builds the station of their choice, then can roam around the interior.

== Reception ==
Edge described the game as "not some crappy pictures-and-text multimedia effort", calling it a "brilliant guide to a complex and specialized subject". PC Review stated that the game was both "absolutely full of information" and "visually impressive", though they criticized some technical terms that assume a level of prior scientific knowledge, and the lack of ability to do anything on the station after it is constructed besides drift around. The publication nevertheless thought that it was a good value. Boot magazine also rated the game highly, writing that "packed with a wealth of information and tons of stunningly sharp visuals, Space Station Simulator soars". The game was recommended by PC Authority, who commended the game on its "well-organized interface" and a lack of American bias, treating the modules of all countries with equal levels of detail.

The game was reportedly used to familiarize actual ISS astronauts to the station prior to them inhabiting it.
