= Majestic Part I: Alien Encounter =

1995 video game

Majestic Part 1: Alien Encounter
- Developers: Istvan Pely, Stephan Sherban, Seth Jones
- Publisher: Piranha Interactive Publishing
- Producer: Istvan Pely
- Designer: Istvan Pely
- Programmer: Istvan Pely
- Artist: Istvan Pely
- Writers: Sherban Young; Richard Sigler
- Composer: Seth W. Jones
- Platforms: Windows; Macintosh
- Release: November 1995
- Genre: Point-and-click adventure
- Mode: Single-player

Majestic Part 1: Alien Encounter is a 1995 video game from Piranha Interactive Publishing.

== Gameplay ==
Majestic: Part I – Alien Encounter is a multimedia adventure that begins with the mysterious disappearance of a spacefaring luxury liner. When a lifeboat containing survivors is found, questions arise about what befell the ship and its missing captain. The player assumes the role of a field archaeologist sent to investigate the Majestic using remotely operated probes to gather information from the wreckage. The narrative unfolds through exploration, discovery, and QuickTime video sequences. The user interface is largely intuitive, allowing players to interact smoothly with the environment. The story is linear but allows for nonlinear puzzle-solving and clue collection, with a culmination that pieces together alien subterfuge and hidden agendas among the ship's original crew.

== Development ==
Majestic was developed by Loyola College students Istvan Pely, Stephan Sherban, and Seth Jones. The game was developed with a budget of less than $9,000, financed largely by loans from parents and the "maxed out" credit cards of the three partners.

== Reception ==
Reception

Review scores
Publication	Score
Electric Games	87%
PC Games	41%
PC Spiel	3/5
PC Gamer	52%

Electric Games gave the game a score of 87% stating "Good storyline. Graphics and sounds are all well-balanced. Answers to riddles could have been found in the game. A little short, but well worth playing"
