= Intrigue at Oakhaven Plantation =

2006 point-and-click adventure video game

- Developer: Cindy Pondillo
- Publisher: Cindy Pondillo
- Engine: AGS engine
- Platform: Windows
- Release: November 2006
- Genre: Adventure

Intrigue at Oakhaven Plantation is 2006 point-and-click adventure game. It was a solo project of Cindy Pondillo; her second adventure.

== Plot and gameplay ==
Players take control of cousins Daphne and Dominic as they are invited to the Oakhaven Plantation and learn secrets about its past.

== Critical reception ==
Tom King of Adventure Gamers criticised its retro-style graphics and lack of voice acting, while Ryan Casey of Just Adventure praised Pondillo for completing the project by herself in a short amount of time.
