= Deutscher Computerspielpreis =

Annual video game awards ceremony

- Awarded for: Recognizing the development of innovative computer and video games made in Germany
- Country: Germany
- Presented by: Federal Ministry of Research, Technology and Space; game – The German Games Industry Association
- First award: 31 March 2009; 17 years ago
- Website: Official website

The Deutscher Computerspielpreis (DCP; German Computer Game Awards) is an annual awards ceremony that aims to honour achievements in the German video game industry. In addition to the awards themselves, various amounts of prize money are donated by supporters of the ceremony to the chosen categories.

Since 2009, it has been awarded by the Federal Ministry of Research, Technology and Space (BMFTR) and game – The German Games Industry Association (game association).

== Description ==
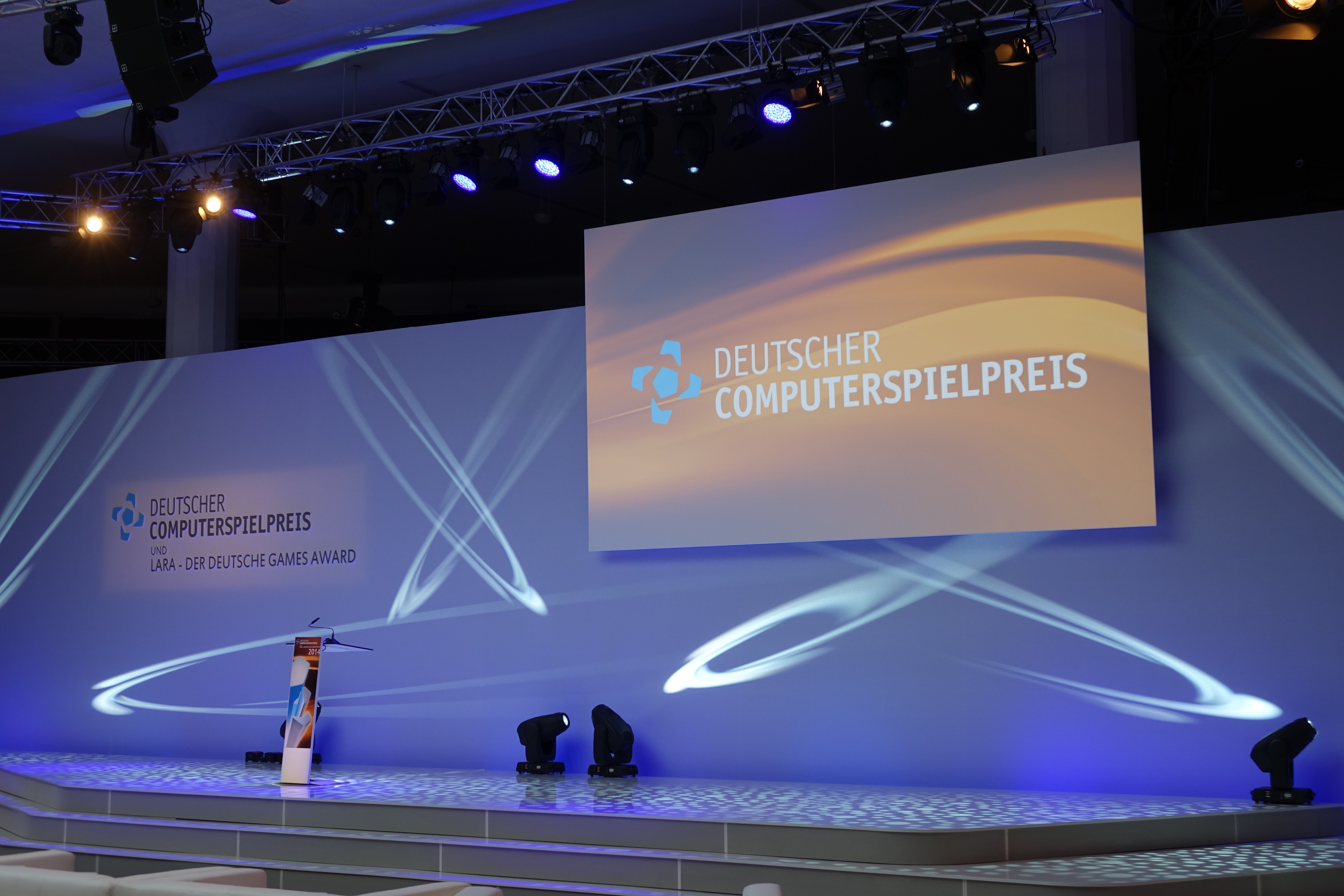
DCP ceremony venue in Postpalast, Munich, 2014

The German Computer Game Awards (Deutscher Computerspielpreis, DCP) were first awarded on 31 March 2009. The awards are presented by the organisers, the BMFTR and the game association.

The ceremony includes a certain amount of prize money for specific categories. The requirement to receive the money is that the winner must prove that they will use the check to develop a new computer game that meets the DCP criteria. The distribution of the prize money is also clearly regulated: the developer receives 70 percent of the sum, while the publisher (if available) receives 30 percent. The prize money is donated by supporters and most recently amounted to a total of €800,000 in 2023.

=== Format ===
The German Computer Game Awards consists of a main jury and ten specialist juries. The main jury is composed of two representatives from each specialist jury. In addition, the German Bundestag may appoint two more members. Berlin and Bavaria, as the hosting federal states, may each appoint one more member of the jury as well. Specialist juries, the Bundestag, and the hosting federal states ultimately select eleven more individuals to join the main jury. This results in a total of 35 responsible members. The main jury determines the winners of the categories "Best German Game", "Special Jury Award", and "Best International Game". The specialist juries are assembled by the two organizers, the BMFTR and the game association. The jurors come from politics, research, or a field related to gaming. This includes the DCP developer, active players, the press, media educators, and youth media protectors. On average, the specialist juries consist of four people and determine the winners of the remaining ten categories. The format includes the possibility of games being nominated after the official announcement.

== Awarded games ==
=== 2009 ===
In March 2009, the nominations for the first award ceremony were announced, consisting of nine categories with the ceremony being announced to happen on 31 March 2009. The winners were set to receive a total of €600.000 in all categories except for "Best International Game". The winner in the “Best German Game” category was chosen from the winners of the other categories, with the exception of the school and student concepts and the special prize. The ceremony was held in Munich, Germany, with Drakensang: The Dark Eye receiving two awards overall.

Award	Recipient
Best German Game	Drakensang: The Dark Eye – Radon Labs
Best International Game	Wii Fit, LittleBigPlanet
Best Youth Game	Drakensang: The Dark Eye – Radon Labs
Best Children's Game	Fritz and Chesster
Best Browser Game	Ikariam
Best Mobile Game	Crazy Machines
Best Serious Game	TechForce
Best Pupil's Game	Monkey´s World Wide Jungle – Elsa-Brändström-Gymnasium, Oberhausen
Best Student's Game	Snatch'em – Hochschule für Technik und Wirtschaft Berlin

=== 2010 ===
The second ceremony took place on 29 April 2010, where Anno 1404 took the lead by securing two awards. The game was nominated for "Best International Game" after the official announcement of nominations was given out. Gamestar observed that the heightened level of violence in the preceding nominees, Uncharted 2: Among Thieves and Dragon Age: Origins, might have influenced the expansion of nominations.

Award	Recipient
Best German Game	Anno 1404 – Related Designs
Best International Game	Anno 1404 – Related Designs
Best Youth Game	The Whispered World
Best Children's Game	Lernerfolg Vorschule – Capt'n Sharky
Best Browser Game	Wewaii
Best Mobile Game	Giana Sisters DS
Best Serious Game	ExperiMINTe
Best Pupil's Game	GooseGogs – Frederic Schimmelpfennig, Nikolaus-August-Otto-Schule, Bad Schwalbach
Best Student's Game	Night of Joeanne – Mediadesign Hochschule, Düsseldorf

=== 2011 ===
- Best German Game and Best Youth Game: A New Beginning
- Best Children's Game: The Kore Gang
- Best Browser Game: The Settlers Online
- Best mobile Game: Galaxy on Fire 2
- Best "Serious Game": Energetika
- Best concept of the young talents competition: Tiny & Big in Grandpa's Leftovers

=== 2012 ===
- Best German Game Crysis 2
- Best Youth Game: Edna & Harvey: Harvey’s New Eyes
- Best Children's Game: The Great Jitters: Pudding Panic
- Best Browser Game: Drakensang Online
- Best mobile Game: Das verrückte Labyrinth HD
- Best "Serious Game": Vom Fehlenden Fisch – Die Geheimnisvolle Welt der Gemälde
- Best Concept of the Young Talents Competition: About Love, Hate and Other Ones
- Special Award Browser Game: Trauma
- Special Award of the Young Talents Competition: Pan it!

=== 2013 ===
- Best German Game Chaos on Deponia
- Best Youth Game: Tiny & Big in Grandpa's Leftovers
- Best Children's Game: Meine 1. App – Band 1 Fahrzeuge
- Best Browser Game: Forge of Empires
- Best Mobile Game: Word Wonders: The Tower of Babel
- Best "Serious Game": Menschen auf der Flucht
- Best Concept of the Young Talents Competition: GroundPlay

=== 2014 ===
- Best German Game The Inner World
- Best Youth Game: Beatbuddy: Tale of the Guardians
- Best Children's Game: Malduell
- Best Browser Game: Anno Online
- Best Mobile Game: CLARC
- Best Concept of the Young Talents Competition: Scherbenwerk – Bruchteil einer Ewigkeit
- Special award: The Day the Laughter Stopped

=== 2015 ===
The winners were announced on 21 April 2015 in Berlin.

- Best German Game: Lords of the Fallen (Deck13, CI Games)
- Best Children's Game: Fire (Daedalic Entertainment)
- Best Youth Game: TRI: Of Friendship and Madness (Rat King Entertainment, Rising Star Games)
- Best Concept of the Young Talents Competition: In Between
- Best Innovation: Spiel des Friedens (Studio Fizbin, Landesmuseum für Kunst und Kultur Münster)
- Best Staging: Lords of the Fallen (Deck13, CI Games)
- Best Serious Game: Utopolis – Aufbruch der Tiere (Reality Twist, Nemetschek Stiftung)
- Best Mobile Game: Rules! (The Coding Monkeys)
- Best Game Design: The Last Tinker: City of Colors (Mimimi Productions)
- Best International Game: This War of Mine (11 bit studios)
- Best International Multiplayer Game: Hearthstone: Heroes of Warcraft (Blizzard Entertainment)
- Best International New Game World: This War of Mine (11 bit studios)
- Audience Award: Dark Souls II (From Software, Bandai Namco)

=== 2016 ===
The winners were announced on 7 April 2016 in Munich.

- Best German game: Anno 2205 (Blue Byte/Ubisoft)
- Best Concept of the Young Talents Competition: 1. Cubiverse (Mediadesign Hochschule Munich), 2. Lost Ember (HAW Hamburg, Mooneye Studios), 3. Leaves (TU Cologne)
- Best Children's Game: 1. Fiete Choice (Ahoiii Entertainment); 2. Shift Happens (Klonk)
- Best Youth Game: One Button Travel (The Coding Monkeys)
- Best Innovation: The Climb (Crytek)
- Best Staging: Typoman (Brainseed Factory, Headup Games)
- Best Serious Game: Professor S. (LudInc, Berlin)
- Best Mobile Game: Path of War (Envision Entertainment, Nexon)
- Best Game Design: Shift Happens (Klonk)
- Best International Game: The Witcher 3: Wild Hunt (CD Projekt RED, Bandai Namco)
- Best International Multiplayer Game: Splatoon (Nintendo)
- Best International New Game World: The Witcher 3: Wild Hunt (CD Projekt Red, Bandai Namco)
- Special Jury Award: Indie Arena Booth
- Audience Award: The Witcher 3: Wild Hunt (CD Projekt Red, Bandai Namco)

=== 2017 ===
The nominations were announced in March 2017 while the ceremony was held in April, 2017 in Berlin.

- Best German game: Portal Knights (Keen Games/505 Games)
- Best Concept of the Young Talents Competition: 1. DYO (HTW Berlin), 2. Isometric Epilepsy (Technical University of Cologne, North Rhine-Westphalia), 3. ViSP – Virtual Space Port (HTW Berlin)
- Best Children's Game: She Remembered Caterpillars (Jumpsuit Entertainment, Kassel/Ysbyrd Games, Brighton)
- Best Youth Game: Code 7 – Episode 0: Allocation (Goodwolf Studio, Bonn)
- Best Innovation: VR Coaster Rides and Coastiality App (VR Coaster, Kaiserslautern)
- Best Staging: Robinson: The Journey (Crytek, Frankfurt)
- Best Serious Game (two winners): Debugger 3.16: Hack’n’Run (Spiderwork Games, Vechta), Orwell (Osmotic Studios, Hamburg/Surprise Attack, Melbourne)
- Best Mobile Game: Glitchskier (Shelly Alon, Hamburg)
- Best Game Design: Shadow Tactics: Blades of the Shogun (Mimimi Productions, Munich/Daedalic Entertainment, Hamburg)
- Best International Game: The Legend of Zelda: Breath of the Wild (Nintendo, Kyoto/Japan)
- Best International Multiplayer Game: Overwatch (video game) (Activision Blizzard, Santa Monica, California/United States)
- Best International New Game World: Uncharted 4: A Thief's End (Naughty Dog/Sony Interactive Entertainment, Santa Monica, California)
- Special Jury Award: Computerspielemuseum Berlin (Berlin)
- Audience Award: The Witcher 3: Wild Hunt – Blood and Wine (CD Projekt, Warsaw/Poland)

=== 2018 ===
The winners were announced on 10 April 2018 in Munich.

- Best German game: Witch It (Barrel Roll Games, Hamburg)
- Best Children's Game: Monkey Swag (Tiny Crocodile Studios/kunst-stoff, Berlin)
- Best Youth Game: Witch It (Barrel Roll Games, Hamburg)
- Best Innovation: HUXLEY (Exit Adventures, Kaiserslautern)
- Best Staging: The Long Journey Home (Daedalic Entertainment, Düsseldorf)
- Best Serious Game: Vocabicar (Quantum Frog, Oldenburg)
- Best Mobile Game: Card Thief (Arnold Rauers, Berlin)
- Best Game Design: TownsmenVR (HandyGames, Giebelstadt)
- Best International Game: Assassin's Creed Origins (Ubisoft)
- Best International Multiplayer Game: Witch It (Barrel Roll Games, Hamburg)
- Best International Game World: Horizon Zero Dawn (Guerrilla Games/Sony Interactive Entertainment)
- Young Talent with Concept: 1. Ernas Unheil (HTW Berlin), 2. Sunset Devils (Carl-Hofer-Schule, Karlsruhe)
- Young Talent with Prototype: 1. Fading Skies (HAW Hamburg), 2. Realm of the Machines (Mediadesign Hochschule, München)
- Special Jury Award: Friendly Fire (charity campaign)
- Audience Award: ELEX (Piranha Bytes, Essen)

=== 2019 ===
The awards were announced on 9 April 2019 in Munich.

- Best German game: Trüberbrook (Headup Games)
- Best Children's Game: Laika (Mad About Pandas)
- Best Youth Game: Unforeseen Incidents (Application Systems Heidelberg)
- Best Innovation: Bcon – The Gaming Wearable (CapLab)
- Best Staging: Trüberbrook (Headup Games)
- Best Serious Game: State of Mind (Daedalic Entertainment)
- Best Mobile Game: see/saw (kamibox)
- Best Game Design: Tower Tag (VR Nerds)
- Best International Game: God of War (Sony Interactive Entertainment)
- Best International Multiplayer Game: Super Smash Bros. Ultimate (Nintendo)
- Best International Game World: Red Dead Redemption 2 (Rockstar Games)
- Young Talent with Concept: Elizabeth (HTW Berlin)
- Young Talent with Prototype: A Juggler’s Tale (Film Academy Baden-Württemberg)
- Special Jury Award: A Maze. / Berlin (International Games and Playful Media Festival)
- Audience Award: Thronebreaker: The Witcher Tales (CD Projekt Red)

=== 2020 ===
- Best German Game: Anno 1800 (Ubisoft Mainz/Ubisoft)
- Best Family Game: Tilt Pack (Navel/Super.com)
- Young Talent - Best Debut: The Longing (Studio Seufz/Application Systems Heidelberg)
- Young Talent - Best Prototype: Couch Monsters (Laurin Grossmann, John Kees, Marie Maslofski, Dennis Oprisa, Luca Storz, Jaqueline Vintonjek – HTW Berlin)
- Best Innovation and Technology: Lonely Mountains: Downhill (Megagon Industries/Thunderful Publishing)
- Best Games World and Aesthetics: Sea of Solitude (Jo-Mei/Electronic Arts)
- Best Game Design: Anno 1800 (Ubisoft Mainz/Ubisoft)
- Best Serious Game: Through the Darkest of Times (Paintbucket Games/HandyGames)
- Best Mobile Game: Song of Bloom (Kamibox)
- Best Expert Game: Avorion (Boxelware)
- Best International Game: Star Wars Jedi: Fallen Order (Electronic Arts)
- Best International Multiplayer Game: Apex Legends (Electronic Arts)
- Player of the Year: gob b (Fatih Dayik)
- Best Studio: Yager Development (Berlin)
- Special Jury Award: Foldit
- Audience Award: The Witcher 3: Wild Hunt for Nintendo Switch (CD Projekt RED / Bandai Namco)

=== 2021 ===
- Best German Game: Desperados III (Mimimi Games/THQ Nordic)
- Best Family Game: El Hijo – A Wild West Tale (Honig Studios, Quantumfrog/HandyGames – a THQ Nordic Division)
- Young Talent - Best Debut: Dorfromantik (Toukana Interactive)
- Young Talent - Best Prototype: Passing By (Hannah Kümmel, Jan Milosch, Marius Mühleck, Ilona Treml)
- Best Innovation and Technology: Holoride (Holoride)
- Best Games World and Aesthetics: Cloudpunk (ION Lands)
- Best Game Design: Dorfromantik (Toukana Interactive)
- Best Serious Game: Welten der Werkstoffe (Cologne Game Lab der TH Köln)
- Best Mobile Game: Polarized! (Marcel-André Casasola Merkle/TheCodingMonkeys)
- Best Expert Game: Suzerain (Torpor Games/Fellow Traveller)
- Best International Game: The Last of Us Part II (Naughty Dog/Sony Interactive Entertainment)
- Best International Multiplayer Game: Animal Crossing: New Horizons (Nintendo)
- Player of the Year: Gnu (Jasmin K.)
- Best Studio: Mimimi Games (Munich)
- Special Jury Award: Indie Arena Booth Online 2020 (Super Crowd Entertainment)

=== 2022 ===
- Best Live Game: Hunt: Showdown (Crytek)
- Best German Game: Chorus (Deep Silver)
- Best Family Game: Omno (Studio Inkyfox, Future Friends Games)
- Best Games World and Aesthetics: A Juggler’s Tale (Mixtvision Games, kaleidoscube)
- Young Talent - Best Debut: White Shadow (Headup Games, Thunderful Games, Mixtvision Games, Monokel)
- Young Talent - Best Prototype: Wiblu (Donausaurus)
- Best Innovation and Technology: Warpdrive Holocafe
- Best Game Design: Kraken Academy!! (Fellow Traveller, Happy Broccoli Games)
- Best Serious Game: EZRA (Landesverband Kinder- und Jugendfilm Berlin e.V.)
- Best Mobile Game: Albion Online (Sandbox Interactive)
- Best Expert Game: Imagine Earth (Serious Brothers)
- Best International Game: Elden Ring (BANDAI NAMCO Entertainment Germany, From Software)
- Best International Multiplayer Game: It Takes Two (video game) (Electronic Arts, Hazelight Studios)
- Player of the Year: Maximilian Knabe "HandOfBlood"
- Best Studio: CipSoft
- Special Jury Award: Games Jobs Germany

=== 2023 ===
- Best German Game: Chained Echoes (Deck13, Matthias Linda)
- Best Family Game: Die magische Bretterbudenburg (Meander Books)
- Young Talent - Best Debut: Signalis (Humble Games, rose-engine)
- Young Talent - Best Prototype: Light of Atlantis (HAW Hamburg, Duck 'n' Run Games)
- Best Innovation and Technology: Beethoven (Opus 360, agon e.V.)
- Best Game Design: Dome Keeper (Raw Fury, Bippinbits)
- Best Serious Game: Beholder 3 (Alawar, Paintbucket Games)
- Best Mobile Game: Dungeons of Dreadrock (Christoph Minnameier)
- Best Expert Game: Touch Type Tale - Strategic Typing (Epic Games, Pumpernickel Studios)
- Best Graphics Design: Abriss (Randwerk Games)
- Best Audio Design: Signalis (Humble Games, rose-engine)
- Best International Game: God of War Ragnarök (Sony Interactive Entertainment, Santa Monica Studio)
- Player of the Year: Pia Scholz aka Shurjoka
- Best Studio: Paintbucket Games
- Special Jury Award: FemDevMeetup

=== 2024 ===
- Best German Game: Everspace 2 (ROCKFISH Games)
- Best Family Game: Spells & Secrets (Alchemist Interactive/rokaplay)
- Young Talent - Best Debut: Ad Infinitum (Hekate/NACON)
- Young Talent - Best Prototype: Misgiven (Symmetry Break Studio)
- Best Innovation and Technology: Marble Maze (Fox-Assembly)
- Best Game Design: Lose CTRL (Play From Your Heart)
- Best Serious Game: Friedrich Ebert – Der Weg zur Demokratie (Playing History/Stiftung Reichspräsident-Friedrich-Ebert-Gedenkstätte)
- Best Mobile Game: Cat Rescue Story (Tivola Games)
- Best Story: Ad Infinitum (Hekate/NACON)
- Best Graphics Design: The Bear – A Story from the World of Gra (Mucks! Games)
- Best Audio Design: Ad Infinitum (Hekate/NACON)
- Best International Game: Baldur’s Gate 3 (Larian Studios)
- Player of the Year: Maurice Weber
- Studio of the Year: Pixel Maniacs
- Special Jury Award: Gaming ohne Grenzen

=== 2025 ===
- Best German Game: Enshrouded (Keen Games)
- Best Family Game: PRIM (Common Colors)
- Young Talent - Best Debut: Nordhold (Stunforge / Stunforge & HypeTrain Digital)
- Young Talent - Best Prototype: Blob the Klex (Hochschule Darmstadt / Melena Dressel, Alejandro Rebolledo, Laura Octavianus)
- Best Innovation and Technology: Enshrouded
- Best Audio Design: ODDADA (Sven Ahlgrimm, Mathilde Hoffmann, Bastian Clausdorff / Sven Ahlgrimm)
- Best Game Design: Thronefall (Grizzly Games)
- Best Graphics Design: Harold Halibut (Slow Bros.)
- Best Mobile Game: Duck Detective: The Secret Salami (Happy Broccoli Games)
- Best Story: Vampire Therapist (Little Bat Games)
- Best Serious Game: Deine Stimme (Sebastian Grünwald & Reality Twist / Bayrische Landeszentrale für politische Bildungsarbeit)
- Studio of the Year: Megagon Industries
- Best International Game: Split Fiction (Hazelight Studios / Electronic Arts)
- Player of the Year: Steinwallen
- Special Jury Award: GAME:IN and Flipper- und Arcademuseum Seligenstadt.

=== 2026 ===
- Best German Game: The Darkest Files (Paintbucket Games)
- Best Family Game: Flick Shot Rogues (Butter By The Fish / Noodlecake Studios)
- Best Debut: Tiny Bookshop (neoludic games / Skystone Games)
- Best Prototype: Garden Ink (Arne Jürgens, Sven Mehlhorn)
- Best Innovation and Technology: Anno 117: Pax Romana (Ubisoft Mainz/Ubisoft)
- Best Audio Design: Everspace 2: Wrath of the Ancients (Rockfish Games)
- Best Game Design: Super Meat Boy 3D (Sluggerfly / Headup)
- Best Graphics Design: The Berlin Apartment (Blue Backpack / ByteRockers’ Games)
- Best Mobile Game: MicroMacro: Downtown Detective (Soft Boiled Games)
- Best Story: The Berlin Apartment (Blue Backpack / ByteRockers’ Games)
- Best Serious Game: The Darkest Files (Paintbucket Games)
- Best International Game: Blue Prince (Dogubomb / Raw Fury)
- Player of the Year: Dennsen86
- Studio of the Year: weltenbauer. Software Entwicklung
- Special Jury Award: Forschungsverbund RadiGaMe

== See also ==
- Deutscher Entwicklerpreis (German Developer Award)
