= Patrick Rau =

German video game designer

Patrick Rau (born 1976 in Waldshut, Germany) is a German video game designer, entrepreneur and honorary professor for Game Art and Design. He is the founder, managing director and creative director of the Berlin‑based studios kunst‑stoff GmbH and Mad About Pandas.

== Career ==
Rau studied Communication Design from 1997 to 2001, graduating with an M.A. degree. From 2001 to 2008, he worked as a freelance game designer and developer of interactive media and exhibition formats. In 2008, he founded kunst‑stoff GmbH – Interactive Media and Games. In 2017, he established a second studio, Mad About Pandas – Creative Media Productions, also based in Berlin. Between 2014 and 2021, Rau taught game design and production at various universities. From 2022 to 2025, he held a full‑time teaching position in the Game Art and Design programme at the University of Fine Arts Essen. In 2026, he was appointed honorary professor at the same institution.

== Work ==
Rau has been active in the development of computer games and interactive media since the early 2000s. His projects include titles such as The Great Jitters, Galaxy Racers (with Ubisoft), Laika, Hitchhiker (with Versus Evil) and Yerba Buena (with Focus Entertainment). His work has received multiple national and international awards, including the German Computer Game Award, the German Developer Award, the Red Dot Award, the NYX Games Award and the Game Connection Award.
