= Team Indie =

2014 video game

- Developer: Brightside Games
- Publisher: Brightside Games
- Platforms: Windows; Mac OS
- Release: October 9, 2014
- Genre: Platformer
- Mode: Single-player

Team Indie is a crossover video game developed by Brightside Games in collaboration with various indie game developers.

== Plot ==
One day, a man and his cat Oskar receive a package with another cat named Marvin. Feeling fear for being replaced, Oskar has an argument with Marvin, and rips his necklace off. And for an unknown circumstance, Marvin ends up trapped in the video game world. Now, Marvin has to team up with other video game characters in order to return to the real world, but Oskar has other plans.

== Characters ==
=== Original characters ===
- Marvin
- Oskar

=== Featured characters ===
Character	Video game	Developer
Commander Video	Runner2: Future Legend of Rhythm Alien	Gaijin Games / Choice Provisions
Clunk	Awesomenauts	Ronimo Games
Super Crate Box Guy	Super Crate Box	Vlambeer
Black Fluff Ball	Badland	Frogmind
Tiny	Tiny & Big in Grandpa's Leftovers	Black Pants Studio
Mi	Knytt Underground	Nifflas’ Games
J. Jitters	The Great Jitters: Pudding Panic	Kunststoff
Dustgirl	Dustforce	Hitbox Team
Tim	Braid	Number None

== Receptions ==
Marcus Estrada of HardcoreGamer gave the game 2/5 calling it unique and competent, however not as good as the original games of the characters. Sander Hölsgens of Gamer gave the game 5.5/10 and noted that game has subpar level design and little interesting gameplay besides the time manipulation.
