= Kunst-stoff GmbH =

German video game company

- Type: Limited
- Industry: Video games
- Founded: 2008
- Website: https://kunst-stoff.de/

Kunst-stoff (German "Artificial Substance/Plastic") is a video games company based in Berlin, Germany. It was founded in 2008 by Patrick Rau. Most notably, kunst-stoff produced The Great Jitters, which was awarded the German Computer Games Prize in 2012. The profile of the company includes games such as Truck Simulation 16 for Android and Forever Forest for Nintendo Switch. Kunst-stoff currently operates under the new name Mad About Pandas.
