= Omno =

2021 adventure video game

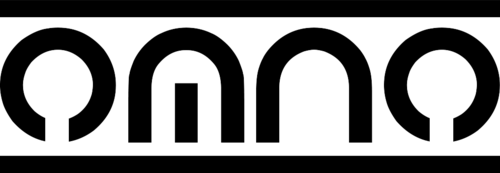
- Developer: Studio Inkyfox
- Publishers: Studio Inkyfox; Future Friends Games
- Designer: Jonas Manke
- Composer: Benedict Nichols
- Engine: Unreal Engine 4
- Platforms: Windows; PlayStation 4; Xbox One; Nintendo Switch
- Release: Windows, PlayStation 4, Xbox One; 29 July 2021; Nintendo Switch; 16 December 2021
- Genre: Adventure
- Mode: Single-player

Omno is a 2021 adventure game, developed by German video game developer Jonas Manke under the name Studio Inkyfox, and published by Studio Inkyfox and Future Friends Games. It was released for Windows, PlayStation 4 and Xbox One in July 2021, followed by a Nintendo Switch version in December 2021. Its gameplay combines exploration, environmental puzzles and 3D platforming as a staff-bearing traveller passes through the remains of a lost civilisation. The game has no combat mechanics.

Manke began developing Omno in 2016 as a hobby project while working as a character animator. After attracting attention to early footage, he financed its continued development through crowdfunding and other funding and began working on it full-time. The game received generally favourable reviews, particularly for its visual design, environments, music and movement, although critics differed over its platforming, repetition and sparse narrative. It won Best Indie Game at the 2021 Deutscher Entwicklerpreis and Best Family Game at the 2022 Deutscher Computerspielpreis.

== Gameplay ==
Omno is played from a third-person perspective and combines exploration, puzzles and platforming. The player controls an unnamed traveller carrying a magical staff through a succession of environments including forests, deserts and frozen regions. The larger areas are relatively open and allow objectives to be approached in different orders.

Progression is based on gathering energy and obtaining spheres of light. Energy can be collected by interacting with animals and the environment or by completing platforming and puzzle sequences. Each major area contains more spheres than are necessary to progress, allowing players either to continue after obtaining the required number or remain to explore the area further. Animals encountered during exploration are recorded in a compendium, and some are involved in traversal or puzzles.

The traveller acquires additional movement abilities as the game progresses, including dashing, gliding, teleportation and using the staff to surf across terrain. Omno contains no conventional combat mechanics or systems. Falling into deep water or from a platform instead returns the player to a nearby checkpoint, and there is no lives system. Details of the lost civilisation and the traveller's journey are conveyed largely through inscriptions and environmental storytelling rather than dialogue or lengthy cutscenes.

== Development and release ==
Jonas Manke began developing Omno in 2016 while working full-time as a freelance character animator. It was his first game as a designer, and he initially worked on it during his spare time. Manke originally experimented with a more realistic visual style before deciding that producing detailed assets on the scale he envisaged was impractical for a solo developer. He consequently developed a simplified style in which lighting, fog, silhouettes and other atmospheric effects carried much of the visual detail. The game's environments were designed as a succession of comparatively large areas connected by shorter linear passages, giving players freedom to explore while maintaining an overall route through the game.

Combat was deliberately omitted. Manke said that he wanted to find forms of interaction and conflict resolution that did not depend on violence, making exploration, movement and puzzle-solving the principal mechanics. He acknowledged Journey as an influence but regarded the similarities between the two games as narrower than their visual presentation suggested. Other influences he cited included Final Fantasy VII, the Super Mario series, Abzû, the films of Studio Ghibli and The Lord of the Rings.

Early public footage of the project attracted substantial interest, encouraging Manke to pursue it as a commercial game. A Kickstarter crowdfunding campaign held in late 2018 raised more than three times its €32,000 target from over 3,000 backers, allowing Manke to continue development full-time. Manke founded Studio Inkyfox in 2019. The project subsequently received an Epic MegaGrant and €70,000 in production funding from the Film- und Medienstiftung NRW. Feedback from a playable demo led Manke to revise elements including the camera, climbing, controls, size of the environments and communication of objectives. In a 2020 preview of Omno, Wireframe described the game as an example of a small-scale production creating an impression of a much larger world, highlighting Manke's use of fog, lighting, particles and colour around comparatively simple, low-polygon geometry.

Manke developed the game in Unreal Engine 4, while Benedict Nichols composed its music. Studio Inkyfox and Future Friends Games served as publishers.

Omno was released for Windows, PlayStation 4 and Xbox One on 29 July 2021 and was included with Xbox Game Pass at launch. A Nintendo Switch version followed on 16 December 2021.

== Reception ==
Reception

Aggregate scores
Aggregator	Score
Metacritic	76/100 (PC); 82/100 (PS4); 77/100 (XONE); 71/100 (NS)
OpenCritic	74%

Review scores
Publication	Score
Nintendo Life	7/10 (NS)
Jeuxvideo.fr	8/10
Jeuxvideo.com	13/20

According to review aggregator Metacritic, Omno received "generally favorable" reviews. OpenCritic reported an average score of 79 out of 100, with 74% of critics recommending the game.

Reviewers frequently compared Omno with the 2012 video game Journey. Christian Donlan of Eurogamer wrote that its lonely environments, surfing and ancient structures initially invited the comparison, but said he largely stopped thinking about Journey while playing. He liked the succession of different locations, simple activities and non-violent exploration. Pierre Crochart of Jeuxvideo.fr likewise regarded the influence from Journey as clear but argued that Omno distinguished itself through a stronger emphasis on puzzles and exploration and developed its own setting and mechanics.

Jan Wöbbeking of 4Players highlighted the combination of surfing, jumping, boosting and teleporting, as well as the variety of creatures and the adaptive soundtrack. He considered the animals one of the highlights of exploration and regarded the game's mixture of movement and puzzles as sufficiently varied that the absence of combat was not a drawback. Georg Pichler of Der Standard praised the atmospheric use of relatively simple graphics, the animation, controls and sound design. He particularly noted the way the music responded to the player's actions, while finding that the repeated structure of locating and collecting light spheres made the individual areas formulaic. Donovan Erskine of Shacknews praised the environmental storytelling, puzzles and creature and world design, but found the platforming inconsistent because judging jumps and depth could be difficult.

Jeuxvideo.com praised the game's colourful landscapes, animals and increasingly varied movement abilities but criticized technical slowdowns, inconsistent platforming and levels that adhered too closely to the same structure. Crochart praised its visual presentation, gradual introduction of abilities, pacing and accessibility, while criticizing occasional platforming imprecision, an abrupt ending and an intentionally opaque setting. Reviewing the later Switch version, Roland Ingram of Nintendo Life characterized its low difficulty as deliberate rather than a flaw and praised the later movement mechanics, environments and meditative music. He nevertheless found some platforming awkward, considered some sliding-block puzzles uninspired and thought the mechanics offered relatively few surprises.

=== Accolades ===
At the 2021 Deutscher Entwicklerpreis, Omno won Best Indie Game and was also nominated for Best German Game and Best Graphics. The following year, it won Best Family Game at the Deutscher Computerspielpreis. It was additionally nominated there for Best Game World and Aesthetics and Best Game Design.
