= Federal Agency for Child and Youth Protection in the Media =

German federal agency for youth media protection

- German: Bundeszentrale für Kinder- und Jugendmedienschutz

Agency overview
- Formed: 1954
- Jurisdiction: Germany
- Headquarters: Bonn
- Agency executive: Sebastian Gutknecht, Director
- Parent department: Federal Ministry for Education, Family Affairs, Senior Citizens, Women and Youth
- Website: bzkj.de

The Federal Agency for Child and Youth Protection in the Media (German: Bundeszentrale für Kinder- und Jugendmedienschutz, BzKJ) is a German federal agency responsible for reviewing media considered harmful to minors under German law. Established in 1954, it was known as the Federal Review Board for Works Harmful to Youth and Adolescents (German: Bundesprüfstelle für jugendgefährdende Schriften, BPjS) until 2003, then as the Federal Review Board for Media Harmful to Young Persons (German: Bundesprüfstelle für jugendgefährdende Medien, BPjM) until 2021. It is based in Bonn, and operates under the Federal Ministry for Education, Family Affairs, Senior Citizens, Women and Youth.

The agency maintains a list of published media it has deemed harmful to children. Media present on this list may face legal restrictions on its sale, distribution, and advertising in Germany.

== Legal basis ==
Article 5 of the Basic Law of Germany guarantees the rights of freedom of expression and artistic freedom. However, these rights are not unlimited; Article 5, Paragraph 2 states that they may be restricted in several cases, including "in provisions for the protection of young persons."

The Basic Law does not define specific criteria for speech to be considered harmful to a young person. Instead, standards are determined by Bundestag legislation. The Law for the Protection of Minors in Public was adopted in 1951. In the following decades, the Bundestag enacted additional legislation to refine these standards on harmful content.

Major updates were made in 2002 through the Protection of Young Persons Act (Jugendschutzgesetz, JuSchG) and the State Treaty on Media Protection of Young Persons (Jugendmedienschutz-Staatsvertrag, JMStV), which regulate physical and digital media respectively. The former regulates freedom of expression in physical media, such as printed works, videos, CD-ROMs, and DVD-ROMs, while the latter regulates broadcasts and virtual media. These two laws provide the legal basis for the actions of the BzKJ.

== History ==
The BzKJ's earliest precursor, the Federal Review Board for Works Harmful to Youth and Adolescents (German: Bundesprüfstelle für jugendgefährdende Schriften or BPjS), held its first session in 1954. It was formally established by the Law on the Distribution of Works Harmful to Youth and Adolescents in 1958, and was assigned to the Federal Ministry of the Interior until 1967. The law was subject to political debate: the CDU/CSU had originally proposed the bill in 1949, but opposition from the SPD and KPD led to a prolonged revision process that delayed its passage for years.

The BPjS's first session took place in 1954. CDU Minister of the Interior Gerhard Schröder had requested the BPjS investigate Il Piccolo Sceriffo, an Italian comic book series, and two editions of the Tarzan comics. Schröder claimed that Il Piccolo Sceriffo was "the result of a degenerate imagination" and "promoted intellectual laziness," and that the Tarzan comics featured a character in a "skimpy fur bikini." The BPjS ultimately decided to index one edition of Il Piccolo Sceriffo on the grounds of its crude language, graphic violence, and presentations of unjustified attacks against American Indians. However, it chose not to index the Tarzan comics.

In 1978, the number and type of institutions that could petition the BPjS to request a work indexed to be widened. Since then, state- and district-level youth welfare offices have been authorized to submit applications. The number of indexing applications increased following this change. During the 1980s, heavy metal music and violent video games emerged as primary areas of concern for the BPjS.

Following the Erfurt school massacre, the Protection of Young Persons Act was passed in 2002 to replace the Law on the Distribution of Works Harmful to Young Persons, as well as several similar laws. The new law clarified the area over which the BPjS had authority and added new forms of media to its jurisdiction, such as websites and computer software. As a result, the organization's name was changed to the Federal Review Board for Media Harmful to Young Persons (Bundesprüfstelle für jugendgefährdende Medien or BPjM). As before, state youth protection agencies and non-governmental youth organizations could request that the board examine works they believed to be inappropriate for children. However, works that had already received an age restriction rating from the Voluntary Self-Regulation of the Film Industry (FSK) or the Entertainment Software Self-Regulation Body (USK) could no longer be indexed. The new law also required that all media indexed by the BPjM be automatically delisted after 25 years, following a review of the content.

In May 2016, SPD Family Minister Manuela Schwesig announced the government's intent to reform the BPjM to better protect children "from the dangers of the World Wide Web". In May 2021, the Jugendschutzgesetz was amended to implement these changes. To reflect its new, broader mandate, the BPjM's name was changed to the Federal Agency for Child and Youth Protection in the Media (Bundeszentrale für Kinder- und Jugendmedienschutz or BzKJ). Other amendments to the law required streaming services and online gaming platforms to transparently implement age verification systems.

=== List of presiding officers ===
The following people have served as the presiding officer of the BzKJ and its predecessor:

No.	Presiding Officer	Term Start	Term End
1	Robert Schilling	1954	1966
2	Werner Jungleblodt	1966	1969
3	Rudolf Stefen	1969	1991
4	Elke Monssen-Engberding	1991	2016
5	Martina Hannak-Meinke	2016	2020
6	Sebastian Gutknecht	2021	Incumbent

== Role and responsibilities ==
The BzKJ has three primary statutory responsibilities:

- Indexing media harmful to young people, thereby restricting their accessibility to adults;
- Supporting the development and distribution of educational media;
- Informing the public about youth media protection.

§ 18 Paragraph 1 of the Protection of Young Persons Act defines "endangering to young people" as that which is harmful "to the development of children or young people or to their education as autonomous and socially-compatible individuals." The law defines harmful content as material that is "immoral, brutalizing, or which provokes violence, crime, or racial hatred".

Under § 15 Paragraph 2 of the Protection of Young Persons Act, certain types of content are subject to restricted distribution by virtue of the law on account of their obvious harm to young people, without the need to add them to the Index. These include: content proscribed by the criminal law, such as Volksverhetzung (incitement to hate or violence against a group of people), instructions on how to commit a crime, glorification or trivialization of violence, content glorifying war, incitement to racial hatred, pornography, and content depicting minors in harmful situations.

Upon application by a youth welfare office or, less commonly, at the request of an accredited non-governmental youth organization, the BzKJ examines whether a written work, film, computer game, or other media product contains content harmful to young persons. The BzKJ must examine works submitted to it through applications made by governmental bodies, but the BzKJ exercises its own discretion on which requests from non-governmental organizations are accepted for examination.

=== Federal Office for the Enforcement of Children's Rights in Digital Services ===
Since the 2021 reform, the BzKJ also houses the Federal Office for the Enforcement of Children's Rights in Digital Services (German: Stelle zur Durchsetzung von Kinderrechten in digitalen Diensten, KidD). The KidD monitors online platforms' compliance with structural precautionary measures for youth protection under the European Digital Services Act (DSA). It can initiate proceedings against platforms that fail to implement adequate safety measures, such as safe default settings or effective reporting mechanisms for harmful content. The KidD works in coordination with the Federal Network Agency and the Federal Cartel Office as part of Germany's DSA enforcement framework.

=== Recent activities ===
In December 2025, the BzKJ indexed a generative AI text-to-image tool for containing content harmful to minors, marking one of the first such actions against AI-generated media in Germany. The agency also administers a federal funding program for child-appropriate digital offerings, with a 2026 thematic focus on artificial intelligence, interactive media, and democratic participation.

== Indexing ==
The authors, producers, and rights-holders of the work in question are notified of the application or request for indexing and have the right to a legal hearing regarding the examination of their work.

The BzKJ may not continue with the indexing process if the media in question has been rated by the Freiwillige Selbstkontrolle der Filmwirtschaft (FSK) and did not receive an "Adults only" rating or if it is a piece of entertainment software that has been rated by the Unterhaltungssoftware Selbstkontrolle (USK) on or after 1 April 2003.

=== Decision-making panel ===
The decision on whether a work is harmful to young persons is made by a panel typically consisting of twelve members. The panel may be reduced to three members when a work is deemed obviously harmful to young persons. On these panels, youth protection agencies, the arts, and businesses are represented by honorary assessors. The members of the panel act independently and have a duty not to let their actions be guided by their own interests.

The twelve-member panel consists of the Presiding Officer (or Deputy Presiding Officer) and assessors representing art, literature, book publishers, video publishers, the telecommunications industry, private-sector youth organizations, public-sector youth organizations, teaching staff, and the clergy. Additionally, three rotating panel members represent the ministries responsible for youth protection in the sixteen States of Germany.

The hearing, in which representatives of the relevant work may participate, is oral and not open to the public. However, the presiding officer can permit third parties to attend the hearing. Similarly to court proceedings, transcripts of the hearing are not published, but written reasons for a decision can be requested by those not involved in the proceedings. The names of the assessors are disclosed to those participating in the proceedings and are also listed in both the transcript and the indexed decision. If individuals not involved in the proceedings request access to the indexed decision, any identifying information (of assessors as well as any companies or lawyers involved) is removed before the request is fulfilled.

The quorum for the twelve-member panel is nine members, and decisions to index require a two-thirds majority vote. If this majority is not reached, the indexing is rejected. In the event that the BzKJ holds a meeting with exactly nine people, the required majority is seven out of nine instead.

Three-member panels must have at least one assessor representative of art, literature, the book trade and publishing, or the video or telecommunications industry. An application for indexing will be accepted only if the panel votes unanimously.

The person responsible for an indexed work can file suit against a decision to index in an administrative court.

=== List of Media Harmful to Young People ===
The List of Media Harmful to Young People (colloquially known as the Index) is published only for physical media, with virtual works excluded from the list in order to avoid advertising them. It is technically illegal for third parties to publish the list of indexed virtual media. However, there are multiple websites where the list is available. The only sanctioned lists can be found in the quarterly journal BzKJ-Aktuell, an official publication of the BzKJ.

While the publication of the online lists may contravene legal restrictions, their status under German law has not been conclusively determined in court. Only a small number of them have shut down voluntarily after receiving complaints from a number of non-governmental youth protection associations. The publication of these lists may violate the Youth Protection Act. If not, a ban on the publication of the lists would not be permitted under Article 5 of the German constitution.

Under the Youth Protection Act, a decision to index a work remains valid for 25 years, after which it is automatically removed from the index. If the BzKJ is of the opinion that the work still poses a risk of harm to young people, it must go through a new indexing process to keep the work indexed. When a popular movie is removed from the index, there is usually a label that has it re-rated by the FSK (which does not rate indexed movies). Most previously indexed movies receive an FSK 16 or FSK 18 rating. Publishers rarely seek re-rating by the USK for older video games due to limited commercial demand.

If the material or legal situation changes, the rights-holders for an indexed work can apply for the proceedings to be reopened under Article 51 of the Administrative Proceedings Law (Verwaltungsverfahrengesetz) to evaluate removing the work from the list.

The list is subdivided into various sub-lists, and these in turn are subdivided into various indexes:

Sublist	Index	
A, B, E	Under the Protection of Young Persons Act Article 18 Para 2 (1) & (2)	
A, B, E		Sublist A: Works deemed to be harmful to young persons. Sublist B: Works whose distribution is deemed to be prohibited under the Strafgesetzbuch (German Criminal Code); Sublist E: Entries prior to 1 April 2003.
A, B, E	1	Movies (1,419 titles)
A, B, E	2	Games (352 titles)
A, B, E	3	Printed works (395 titles)
A, B, E	4	Audio recordings (2,069 titles)
C, D	Under the Protection of Young Persons Act Article 18 Para 2 (3) & (4)	
C, D		Sublist C: Virtual works deemed to be harmful to young persons whose distribution is prohibited under Article 4 of the State Treaty on Media Protection of Young Persons. Sublist D: Virtual works deemed to potentially be containing content whose distribution is prohibited under the Strafgesetzbuch.
C, D	5	Virtual works (8,102 titles)
Special digest	Confiscations, where these have been notified to the BzKJ	
Special digest	6	Confiscations under Articles 86, 86a, 130 & 130a of the Strafgesetzbuch (200 titles)
Special digest	7	Confiscations under Article 131 of the Strafgesetzbuch (411 titles)
Special digest	8	Confiscations under Articles 184a, 184b & 184c (or, until 1 April 2004, Article 184 III) of the Strafgesetzbuch (169 titles)
Special digest	9	Confiscations under Articles 90a, 111, 166, 185 & 187 of the Strafgesetzbuch (5 titles)
Special digest	Planned indexations/current indexations (physical works)	
Special digest	10	Current indexations of physical works (works indexed in the same month that the current issue of BzKJ-Aktuell was released)
Special digest	11	Planned indexations of physical works

Figures for indexed media are from 31 October 2025. Figures for confiscated media are from February 2022.

=== Legal consequences ===
The legal consequences of a work being listed on the Index are enumerated in § 15 JuSchG:

1. It must not be sold, provided or otherwise made accessible to minors.
2. It must not be displayed where it can be seen by minors. This would, for example, include playing an indexed video game in the presence of minors (e.g. streaming game-play of an indexed video game over the Internet).
3. It must be sold within a shop in an area accessible only to adults ("under the counter"). In general, selling indexed titles per mail order is illegal, however, it is permissible if the package may be handed over only to a specified adult, who has to present their identification.
4. It must not be rented out, except in a shop inaccessible to minors.
5. It must not be imported by mail order. In this case, an adult buyer (importer) is not subject to penalties, if they themselves have no intentions of further disseminating it to others or minors.
6. It must not be advertised or announced in a place where the announcement or advertisement could be seen by minors.
7. If it is for one of the above six causes, production, acquiring, and holding in stores are subject to penalties.

Indexed content of lists A and C can, however, be advertised and sold to adults on the Internet, provided technical measures, such as closed user groups, ensure that minors cannot access the content. Media on lists B and D may be disseminated under the aforementioned conditions; however, they should not be distributed through broadcasting systems, including the Internet.

It is a matter of dispute whether criticism or discussion of indexed works is allowed in works that are accessible to young people. Public prosecutors have not been unanimous in this regard, but publishers tend to lean on the side of safety. For example, in the German version of Marc Saltzman's Game Design: Secret of the Sages, the titles of indexed games were replaced by random strings matching only their first letters and lengths.

Pornographic content on the Internet is legal only if technical measures, such as an age verification system or an Adult-Check-System, prevent minors from accessing it.

== Criticism ==
The BzKJ has drawn criticism for what some see as de facto censorship, paternalism and restricting the freedom of speech and of the press on the following grounds:

- After a work has been indexed, in practice, it also becomes more difficult for adults to get access to it. This is because indexed works can not be advertised and can only be sold by mail order under strict conditions. The sale of such works is therefore often not profitable and the work thus disappears from the market.
- Journalists may carry out self-censorship and choose not to mention the work to avoid possible legal trouble.
- Commentators have noted that Germany's BzKJ is unique among Western democracies in its scope and structure for regulating youth media protection.
- Critics of the BzKJ argue that the rationales for earlier decisions to add works to the index are, in retrospect, reactions to moral panics. An example of this is the controversy about the game River Raid. When the Activision game was added to the BzKJ index in 1984, with the reasoning of being described as a "para-military training game for kids".

One counterargument states that the advertising ban on indexed works is not the aim of the decision to index, but its legal consequence. According to the BzKJ, the agency's indexing decisions serve to inform the public about content it considers unsuitable for minors and to encourage debate about media content affecting young people. In practice this debate seldom takes place. One reason for this is the legal uncertainty as to whether a critical discussion of an indexed work is legally permissible or whether it infringes the advertising ban. This can be traced back to the differing positions of various public prosecutor's offices and a clarification of the legal position by law enforcement agencies would consequently be helpful.

The BzKJ is not a unique organization in its purpose; other western countries also have laws and mechanisms, though different in scope and practice, to prevent, for example, the sale of pornography to minors, Holocaust denial or racist literature and hate speech.

The nature of the BzKJ's judgments has altered over the decades and been modified in accordance with changing public opinion. Decisions to index from the 1950s and 1960s, and those from the early days of computer and video games are unlikely to be made today. Regardless, many of these decisions are still in effect today. Consequently, the time period of 25 years that media is retained on the index remains controversial.

In recent times, it has become more prevalent for digital games on PC to use license keys, which require online activation before use. Many publishers deem it necessary to restrict activation out of Germany for certain games. This leaves German adults without the option to import said games, while consoles do not have those kind of restrictions. So far, importing console games has not led to an incrimination of any publisher. While the advertisement restrictions keep a larger portion of the German population ignorant of indexed media, due to the Internet, it is easier than ever for minors to inform themselves about new media, indexed or otherwise.

== Other restriction mechanisms ==
Indexing is not the only mechanism by which broader circulation of certain media works is prevented in Germany. Works may also receive a confiscation order by a court when certain articles of the Strafgesetzbuch apply to them, such as glorification of violence or denial of the Holocaust. Confiscation results in a nationwide ban on its sale even to adults; the mere possession of such material remains legal (with the exception of child pornography and terrorist propaganda, both of which are illegal under international law).

A well-known example of a confiscated work is Wolfenstein 3D, which was confiscated due to its use of Nazi symbols such as Swastikas. Since it was initially not clarified in court whether video games constitute a form of art, the same occurred with later games in the franchise and any other computer game displaying Nazi-related symbols, even including those that portray Nazism in a negative light. These rulings were later loosened in August 2018 as a result of a ruling from April that same year. The web-based game Bundesfighter II Turbo was released prior to the September 2017 elections, which included parodies of the candidates fighting each other. This included the portrayals of Angela Merkel as a reptiloid and Alexander Gauland, who had a special move that involved Swastika imagery. When this was noticed by public authorities, prosecution of the game began in December, submitting it to the Public Prosecutor General's office for review based on the Wolfenstein 3D decision. The Attorney General declined to consider the game illegal under Strafgesetzbuch section 86a, stating that the 1998 ruling was outdated. Since then, the USK has adopted age ratings for video games and argued that there was no reason not to consider video games as art within the social adequacy clause. As a result, the Supreme Youth Protection Authority of the Federal States adapted the Attorney General's ruling to be applicable to all video games within Germany and subsequently, the USK announced this change in August 2018. The USK reviews all games to judge if the use of imagery under Section 86a remains within the social adequacy clause and deny ratings to those that fail to meet this allowance.

== Notes ==
- BzKJ-Aktuell, Amtliches Mitteilungsblatt der Bundeszentrale für Kinder- und Jugendmedienschutz (BzKJ), ISSN 1611-3608 (print edition), ISSN 1611-3616 (digital edition)
