= Typoman =

2015 video game

- Developer: Brainseed Factory
- Publisher: Brainseed Factory
- Director: Bilal Chbib
- Designer: Zein Okko
- Programmers: Lino Morales; Florian Wurth; Tim Schroeder; Clemens Schmitt; Aaron Grabowy
- Artists: Arton Rexhëbogaj; Lea Dickert; Oleg Gorshkov; Michael Koloch; Zein Okko
- Composer: SonicPicnic
- Engine: Unity
- Platforms: Steam; Wii U; Xbox One; PlayStation 4; Microsoft Windows; Nintendo Switch; iOS; Android
- Release: November 19, 2015: Wii U; WW: November 19, 2015; Microsoft Windows; WW: August 15, 2016; Xbox One; WW: February 17, 2017; PlayStation 4; WW: February 21, 2017; Nintendo Switch; WW: February 22, 2018; iOS & Android (Remastered); WW: July 7, 2022
- Genres: Puzzle, platform

Typoman is an independent video game developed by German indie studio Brainseed Factory for Nintendo Switch, Wii U, Xbox One, PlayStation 4 and PC, and mobile. The game follows a hero named HERO who crafts words to alter the environment around him.

== Gameplay ==
Typoman features a number of environmental puzzles that are solved by crafting words that are relevant to the situation. For example, players can spell "up" to activate an elevator, or "open" to open a door. Situations become increasingly complicated as the game progresses, requiring the player to come up with puns to manipulate items.

== Development ==
The idea of Typoman was born out of a desire to experiment with typography and gameplay. Brainseed Factory founder Bilal Chbib explained that the original plan was to have objects and monsters shaped out of letters. As development continued the team eventually decided to implement puzzle based gameplay using letters and words.

The game was originally a Wii U exclusive, and Nintendo showcased the game at the Nindies@Home program during E3 2015. The game launched for Wii U in the same year.

A year after release, Brainseed Factory published an updated version of the game called Typoman: Revised for PC, Xbox One, PS4, and Nintendo Switch. The revised version implements several design and graphical improvements. The PC version launched in 2016, with the Xbox One and PS4 versions following in February 2017 and the Switch version in February 2018.

== Reception ==
Reception

Aggregate score
Aggregator	Score
Metacritic	WIIU: 57/100; PC: 67/100; XONE: 73/100; PS4: 75/100; NS: 68/100

The original Wii U version of Typoman received mixed reviews from critics, with a score on review aggregator Metacritic of 57/100. Typoman: Revised for Xbox One and PlayStation 4 was better received, scoring 73/100 and 75/100 respectively.

Critics generally praised the game's concept, atmosphere and art style, but directed criticism towards the game's length.

== Accolades ==
Year	Award	Category	Result	Ref
2015	Game Connection America Awards, San Francisco	Best Console / PC Hardcore	Nominated	
2015	Game Connection America Awards, San Francisco	Best Casual	Won	
2015	Game Connection America Awards, San Francisco	Most Promising IP	Nominated	
2015	Deutscher Entwicklerpreis Cologne	Best Game	Nominated	
2015	Deutscher Entwicklerpreis Cologne	Best Indie Game	Nominated	
2015	Deutscher Entwicklerpreis Cologne	Best Sound	Nominated	
2015	Deutscher Entwicklerpreis Cologne	Best Game Design	Nominated	
2015	Deutscher Entwicklerpreis Cologne	Best Console Game	Nominated	
2015	Gaming Trend's E3 Awards, Los Angeles	Best Art Style	Won	
2015	Quo Vadis 2015, Berlin	Best of Quo Vadis Show	Won	
2016	Deutscher Computerspielpreis, Munich	Best Presentation	Won	
2016	German Educational Media Award, Munich	Best Youth Game	Won	
2018	TIGA Games Industry Awards, London	Best Puzzle Game	Nominated	
2018	TIGA Games Industry Awards, London	Visual Design	Nominated	
