= Freiwillige Selbstkontrolle der Filmwirtschaft =

German organization

The Freiwillige Selbstkontrolle der Filmwirtschaft (FSK, transl. Self-Regulatory Body of the Movie Industry) is a German motion picture rating system organization run by the Spitzenorganisation der Filmwirtschaft based in Wiesbaden.

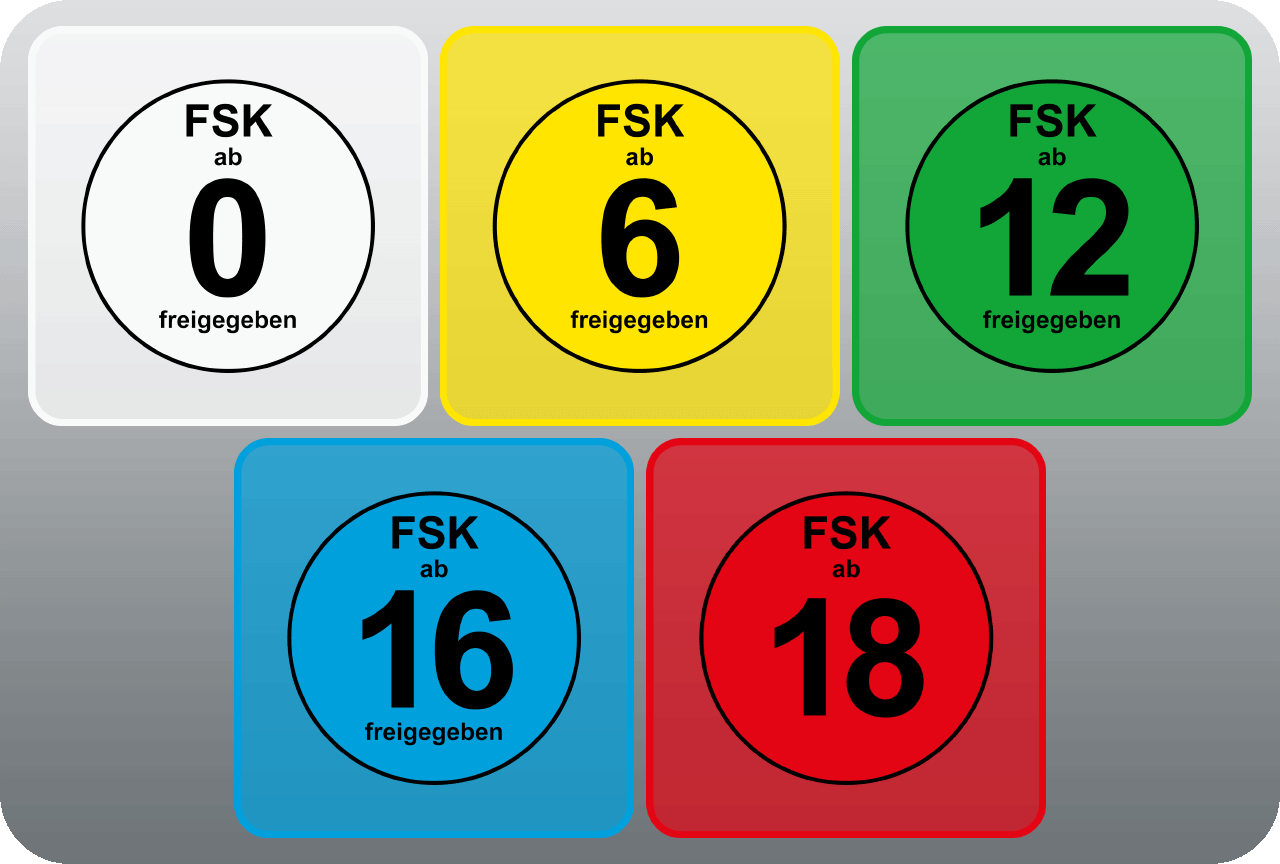
Rating logos for German media by Freiwillige Selbstkontrolle der Filmwirtschaft since December 2008

== Assignment ==
The main tasks of the FSK are approving and rating movies and trailers, videos and DVDs, and commercials.

There is no legal obligation for approval by the FSK; however, members of the SPIO (Spitzenorganisation der Filmwirtschaft) commit themselves to only releasing productions passed by the FSK. Movies not rated by the FSK may only be sold and rented to adults, regardless of their content.

The legal basis for the actions of the FSK is a youth protection law (JuSchG, Jugendschutzgesetz), the holiday regulations and basic principles of the FSK. These principles are issued by the Basic Principles Commission, consisting of 20 representatives from the film and video industry, public authorities and state-funded broadcasting stations governed by public law.

The FSK takes into account whether or not a film is shown on certain specially protected holidays mentioned in the Basic Law for the Federal Republic of Germany. These are Good Friday, All Saints, Volkstrauertag (Memorial Day), Buß- und Bettag (Penance Day) and also Totensonntag (the German Remembrance Sunday).

The FSK is financially autonomous and funds its work through fees from every inspected media carrier. It is operated as an affiliate of the SPIO in the form of a private limited company, but the SPIO does not influence its decisions.

== Ratings ==
- - FSK ab 0 freigegeben, Suitable for all ages
- - FSK ab 6 freigegeben, recommended for persons ages 6 and up
- - FSK ab 12 freigegeben, recommended for persons ages 12 and up
- - FSK ab 16 freigegeben, recommended for persons ages 16 and up
- - FSK ab 18, suitable for adults 18 and up only

=== SPIO/JK certificates ===
If a movie does not comply with FSK basic principles (e.g. glorification of violence), a rating can be denied. A movie that is not rated by FSK is checked for possible violation of applicable law by a jurist agency (Juristen-Kommission, JK) of the Spitzenorganisation der Filmwirtschaft (SPIO). The JK compiles certificates for the reviewed movies. Approved movies receive one of two classifications:

- Keine schwere Jugendgefährung or no severe danger to youth. While these movies are considered by the Juristenkommission to represent a danger to youth, this danger is not perceived to be considerable. In German this is sometimes known as a leichte Jugendgefährdung or mild/slight danger to youth. Films with this certificate may still be only sold on the open market as with films rated FSK 18, but are subject to indexing.
- Strafrechtlich unbedenklich or not in violation of applicable criminal law – Movies given this certificate are usually considered to be a severe danger to youth but do not violate criminal law. A failure to achieve such a certificate is usually attributable to an expected violation of 131b of the German Criminal Code, but may also be in violation of child pornography legislation or the display and promotion of symbols, songs or political ideologies in violation of the constitution (e.g. National Socialism). The awarding of this certificate does not constitute a legal decree. The movie in question may still be confiscated at a later date if decreed by a court of law, as demonstrated with Hostel 2. These films may not be sold openly, even if the film in question has not yet been indexed. Due to their not being certified by the FSK, these movies are also subject to indexing.

While not obligatory, it is common to display a rectangular, black and white logo with "SPIO/JK geprüft" and the JK certificate granted. These movies may be additionally indexed (blacklisted) by the Federal Department for Media Harmful to Young Persons.

== Structure and mode of operation of the FSK ==
Over 190 inspectors work for the FSK on a voluntary, unpaid basis. They are appointed by the movie and video industry and the public authorities for three years, and must have experience in dealing with minors or have similar factual knowledge of psychology or media studies. The inspectors may not be employed by the movie or video industry, to avoid biased decisions. Therefore, when appointing inspectors, importance is attached to the fact that these inspectors should come from different occupational fields and social classes.

The rating of movies is carried out by various committees. These are the Working Committee, which does most of the inspections, the Main Committee, acting as a court of appeal, and the Appeals Committee, for appeals to the youth inspection. In practice, the three committees work in parallel.

The working committees are the first ones in the FSK to inspect each film that is registered. Normally each consists of seven inspectors – three from the movie industry and four named by the public authorities – as well as a representative of the country's youth authorities.

== History ==
After World War II, Erich Pommer, the former UFA film producer and then Film Officer in the American occupation zone, was in charge of rebuilding and reorganizing the German movie industry. Together with film directors Curt Oertel and Horst von Hartlieb, the director of the movie distribution association in Wiesbaden, Pommer developed a voluntary self-inspection system for the movie industry modeled on the Hays Code in the United States. The goal of this institution was to avoid government regulation of the movie industry and to replace the effective military censoring:

And here was our first thought, because we had a bad experience in the Third Reich: to build a self-organized film inspection system, because a federal film inspection system is always in danger of starting to control political attitude (Horst von Hartlieb).

Moreover, youth protection played no role in admission to movies of the occupying powers, so minors had unrestricted access to movies. Because of this, at the start of 1948 the German secretary of education of the western occupied zones set up a commission to answer the question of whether young people were endangered by movies. It was intended to develop suggestions for nationwide youth protection connected to films. The work of this agency began in the Hessian ministry for culture in Wiesbaden. As well as the representatives of the other countries' secretaries of education, representatives of the movie industry, the churches and the Katholische Jugend Bayern (Catholic Youth of Bavaria) were also invited to the hearing.

The result of the hearings was the establishment of the fully self-governed entity known as the FSK. The first film was handed over for inspection on 18 July 1949. On 28 September the allied military agencies officially transferred the inspection authority to the FSK.

The countries of the Soviet occupational zone did not take part in the FSK, since the film inspection there was taken on by the government of the GDR, formed in the same year.

When the German Youth Protection Law was amended in 1985, the mandatory rating was broadened to include new media (video films and comparable picture media). The German Association Video e.V. (e.V = membership corporation) followed the FSK, to inspect all released video films. In the same year, the rating "Freigabe ohne Altersbeschränkung" (Universal) was added.

During German unification the new federal states followed the FSK and sent their representatives to the board of inspectors.

Since 1995, any digital media containing film sequences have been inspected for their rating as well.

The movie Sophie Scholl – Die letzten Tage was the 100,000th film inspected by the FSK on 9 December 2004.

== See also ==
- Motion picture content rating system
- Censorship
- Unterhaltungssoftware Selbstkontrolle
