= Game – The German Games Industry Association =

German video games industry association

game – The German Games Industry Association
- game – Verband der deutschen Games-Branche
- Abbreviation: game
- Formation: 29 January 2018; 8 years ago
- Type: Registered association
- Purpose: Promoting the reputation of the games industry in Germany
- Headquarters: Berlin, Germany
- Coordinates: 52.515472°N 13.388717°E
- Key people: Lars Janssen (Chairman); Julia Pfiffer (Deputy Chairwoman); Felix Falk (Managing Director)
- Website: Official website

The game – The German Games Industry Association (German: game – Verband der deutschen Games-Branche) is the trade association of the German computer and video games industry. game represents the interests of video game developers, video game publishers and other stakeholders in the German video games industry, as well as Esports organisers, universities and service providers. As the organiser of gamescom, the association is responsible for the world’s largest event for video games. game is the owner of the Unterhaltungssoftware Selbstkontrolle (USK), the Foundation for Digital Games Culture, the esports player foundation, as well as the organiser of the German Computer Game Awards (DCP).

game emerged from a merger of the industry associations BIU – Bundesverband Interaktive Unterhaltungssoftware and GAME – Bundesverband der deutschen Games-Branche. The merger took place on 29 January 2018. The association is based in Berlin. Its managing director is Felix Falk.

== Members ==
In 2025, the association had more than 500 members, including well-known companies such as Activision Blizzard, Electronic Arts, Google, Meta Platforms, Microsoft, Nintendo, Nvidia, Sony and Ubisoft.
