= Fire: Ungh's Quest =

2015 point and click puzzle video game

- Developer: Daedalic Entertainment
- Publisher: Daedalic Entertainment
- Platforms: Microsoft Windows, Wii U, Nintendo Switch, IOS, macOS and SteamOS + Linux
- Release: Microsoft Windows; April 9, 2015; Wii U; October 20, 2016; Nintendo Switch; May 12, 2021
- Genres: Puzzle, Adventure game
- Mode: Single-player

Fire: Ungh's Quest, also known simply as Fire, is a point and click-puzzle video game developed and published by Daedalic Entertainment. The game was initially released for Microsoft Windows on April 9, 2015 and was later released for Wii U on October 20, 2016, for Nintendo Switch on May 12, 2021 and later for IOS, macOS and SteamOS + Linux. The game received mixed reviews. Some of the negative points mentioned were the exaggerated ease of quests and the short duration of the game.

== Gameplay ==
The player controls a Neanderthal called Ungh. He was responsible for guarding the village flame, however, on his first night of work, the fire fizzles out, and because of that, Ungh is banned from the village. The protagonist's objective is to find the fire to return to his village. The game is made up of ten scenarios. To advance in level, the player must solve the puzzles.

== Reception ==
Reception

Aggregate scores
Aggregator	Score
Metacritic	64/100
OpenCritic	53/100

Review scores
Publication	Score
IGN	6/10
Nintendo Life	5/10

Jose A. Rodríguez, from IGN España, praised the game's graphic art and soundtrack, however, he pointed out as negative points the lack of dialogues, the excessive ease to complete the levels and the short duration of the game. Liam Doolan of Nintendo Life also praised the graphics but wrote that the game has an insipid offer: "Right down to the name, it makes little effort to stand out from the crowd".

=== Awards ===
Year	Award	Category	Result	Ref.
2015	Deutscher Computerspielpreis	Best child's game	Won	
