= Dungeons of Dreadrock =

2022 video game

- Developer: Christoph Minnameier
- Publisher: Christoph Minnameier
- Artists: Fabian Jastremski (vierbit); Dmytro Dudko (yesidopixels)
- Engine: Unity
- Platforms: Android, iOS, Switch, Windows
- Release: January 31, 2022
- Genres: Puzzle, adventure
- Mode: Single-player

Dungeons of Dreadrock is a puzzle video game created by German indie developer Christoph Minnameier. It is set in a Nordic fantasy world, where the player assumes the role of a young woman who rescues her brother from the eponymous cave system. The game was released in 2022 for Android, iOS, Windows, and Nintendo Switch.

A sequel Dungeons of Dreadrock 2: The Dead King's Secret was released on November 28, 2024 for the Nintendo Switch.

== Gameplay ==
Dungeons of Dreadrock adopts the dungeon setting and the mechanics (trapdoors, switches, teleporters, etc.) of older dungeon crawl games like Dungeon Master or Eye of the Beholder, and transfers them conceptually in a minimalist way to a top-down perspective. In line with this, the gameplay focus shifts from role-playing to puzzle-solving, with the aim of making this type of game accessible to a wider audience. The game includes various other elements like living trees that move back one step when the players hit them, comparable to boxes in Sokoban.

== Reception ==
Dungeons of Dreadrock received "generally positive" reviews for iOS, PC, and Nintendo Switch on the review aggregator Metacritic. Nintendo Life drew a connection between the art style and The Legend of Zelda: The Minish Cap, and Nintendo World Report highlighted the game's design as its central strength. Gamezebo called the game a "labo(u)r of love", while mentioning the controls as a potential bottleneck. Shaun Musgrave of TouchArcade, who reviewed both the iOS and Nintendo Switch versions, separately stated that the game "gets absolutely devious before too long" and "might make you pull your hair out at times" while never being unfair about it, and concluded that, between the two platforms, "if you have to choose, the Switch version is the way to go".

== Awards ==
The game won the international competition Google Play Indie Games Festival, and the first prize of the Indie-Clash competition. It was also nominated in the categories "Best Game Design", "Best Family Game" and "Best Mobile Game" at the Deutscher Computerspielpreis, where it was recognized as "Best Mobile Game". It was nominated for the TOMMI Children's Software Award in the USK12 category, as well as for the best mobile game and the best indie game at the GDWC. Additionally, the game was a finalist in the Pocket Gamer People's Choice Award.
