= Yerba Buena (video game) =

2026 puzzle platformer video game

- Developer: Mad About Pandas
- Publisher: Focus Entertainment
- Composer: Max McCormick
- Platforms: PlayStation 5; Xbox Series X and Series S; Windows
- Release: 29 May 2026
- Genre: Puzzle platformer
- Mode: Single-player

Yerba Buena is a 2026 puzzle platformer video game. The player controls Barb, a character in a virtual representation of 1970s San Francisco, and solves puzzles with the Oscillator, a tool that allows certain properties of objects, such as movement, rotation, and material, to be copied to other objects. The game was developed by German indie studio Mad About Pandas, and was funded in 2023 by a German government grant and additional investment from publisher Focus Entertainment. First announced in March 2026, it was released for PlayStation 5, Xbox Series X and Series S, and Windows on 29 May 2026.

Yerba Buena received mixed reviews. Its general concept, puzzle design, art style, and environmental design were generally praised, while reviewers had more negative opinions on its platforming, accessibility, and writing. Multiple reviewers compared it to Portal.

== Gameplay ==
Yerba Buena is a single-player puzzle platformer. Its central mechanic revolves around the Oscillator, a tool that the player can use to copy and paste behavior from one object to another. Initially, the Oscillator can copy the movement of objects, for example by copying the movement of a crane to a barrel, causing the barrel to move up and down, or the movement of a car to a building, causing the building to move horizontally. Throughout the game, the tool gains the ability to copy more behavior, such as the rotation of objects, the vapor properties of smoke or the bouncy properties of trampolines. The game is presented in first-person, and objects that can be interacted with are color-coded.

The game is titled after Yerba Buena, California, a settlement that would eventually become San Francisco, and is set in 1976 San Francisco. The player controls Barb, a 26-year old originally from the Midwest, who is tasked with saving her friend Russell, who has been kidnapped by biker gangs, and with stopping corporate tech giant Om Technologies' plans to turn a local park into a television tower. It is later revealed that the game is set in a metafictional video game. The nature of the environment, and Barb's ability to manipulate objects with the Oscillator, are caused by glitches owing to the game no longer being updated. One of the enemy characters, Bear, is revealed as the protagonist of the metafictional game, and the narrative shifts to Barb's efforts to escape without the death of Bear, which causes the world to reset to a checkpoint. Development logs found throughout the world tell the story of the development of the metafictional game.

== Development and release ==
Yerba Buena was developed by German indie studio Mad About Pandas, whose previous titles include The Great Jitters: Pudding Panic (2011), and was published by Focus Entertainment. Max McCormick composed for the game.

Mad About Pandas received €1,649,471 in 2023 from the Federal Ministry for Economic Affairs and Energy as part of a game development funding program, along with €2,300,000 from Focus Entertainment. The government grant was one of the largest in the history of the program. The game was first announced on 12 March 2026. It was showcased at the April 2026 Galaxies Spring Showcase, and a demo was concurrently released. The full game was released on 29 May 2026 for PlayStation 5, Xbox Series X and Series S, and Windows.

== Reception ==
Reception

Aggregate scores
Aggregator	Score
Metacritic	PC: 65/100
OpenCritic	50% recommend

Review scores
Publication	Score
Checkpoint Gaming	8/10
Gamereactor	6/10
IGN Deutschland	7/10

Yerba Buena received "mixed or average" reviews on Windows, according to review aggregator Metacritic. 50% of critics recommended the game, according to OpenCritic.

The game was compared to Portal (2007), with IGN's Len Hafer saying "it kind of wants to be Portal". Writing for Checkpoint Gaming, David McNamara said it "inherits [Portal's] cheeky sense of whimsy in subverting physics-based puzzle solutions and player expectations".

Reviewers generally praised the puzzle design. Writing for IGN Deutschland, Sönke Siemens described the puzzles as not providing explicit hints as in Portal, instead attempting to use subtle environmental cues and encouraging the player to use trial and error. They described the puzzles as seemingly unsolvable at first glance, but satisfying to ultimately solve. However, they described the lack of hints as a negative for accessibility. McNamara praised the mechanics of the Oscillator, and the game's introduction of complex puzzles, describing the puzzles as "delightfully cerebral". In a less positive review, Palle Havshøi-Jensen of Gamereactor felt that the puzzles were restrictive and that some were designed illogically, that the first-person perspective and game's physics engine got in the way of solving puzzles, and that the game overall did not live up the potential of its concept.

The art and environmental design received positive feedback, while the narrative writing was criticized. Hafer praised the art style, comparing it to a graphic novel, while criticizing the writing and the setting, describing the setting as "struggling to take more recent problems and transport them back in time to the chosen era". Siemens praised the art style, but commented that background music was only sparingly used, and wanted a more expansive soundtrack. McNamara praised the environment and character design, while describing the narrative as chaotic. Writing for German publication Gameswelt, Jens Bremicker described the presentation as a weakness, and specifically criticized the lack of a German language option, despite being developed in Germany.
