= Unterhaltungssoftware Selbstkontrolle =

German video game content rating organisation

- USK – Unterhaltungssoftware Selbstkontrolle gGmbH
- Abbreviation: USK
- Formation: 1994; 32 years ago
- Type: Non-profit limited company
- Location: Berlin, Germany
- Coordinates: 52.527257°N 13.414322°E
- Region served: Germany, Austria (Salzburg)
- Managing Director: Elisabeth Secker
- Parent organization: game – The German Games Industry Association
- Website: Official website

Unterhaltungssoftware Selbstkontrolle (Note: German pronunciation: [ʊntɐˈhaltʊŋsˌsɔftvɛːɐ̯ ˈzɛlpstkɔnˌtʁɔlə]) (abbreviated to USK (Note: pronounced [uː ʔɛs ˈkaː]); Entertainment Software Self-Regulation Body) is the organisation responsible for video game ratings in Germany. In Austria, it is mandatory in the state of Salzburg, while PEGI is mandatory in Vienna. In Turkey, USK as well PEGI are used for age recommendations.

The USK is owned by game – The German Games Industry Association.

== Ratings ==
The USK uses an age-rating system to designate whether a computer game may be publicly supplied to children and young persons. Retailers are obliged to comply with the restrictions indicated by the rating. For example, a game approved for children aged 12 and above may not be sold to a 10-year-old. Outside of business relations (e.g., parents or adult friends giving the game to a child or youth) there is no such restriction. Advertisement for games rated USK 18 or below is not restricted only if the advertisement itself has no content that is harmful to minors. The five age ratings themselves (0, 6, 12, 16 and 18) are in accordance with article 14, section 2 of Germany’s Protection of Young Persons Act (JuSchG) from 2003, inherited from article 6, section 3 of the preceding Law for the Protection of Young People in Public (JÖSchG).

Prior to the revision of the JÖSchG into the JuSchG in 2003, USK ratings were strictly advisory and weren’t applied universally across all kinds of game software. Publishers of handheld video games (i.e. Game Boy, Atari Lynx etc.) for instance, rarely submitted their titles for a rating. With the revised law, the labelling became mandatory for all game software sold at retail, and many older titles still in circulation that had not yet been rated were submitted to receive a rating retroactively.

=== Symbols ===
A series of colored symbols is used to indicate ratings. Until 2003, all the rating symbols were yellow, except for USK 18, which was red. In 2003, the symbols were redesigned to add colour coding: white for 0, yellow for 6, green for 12, blue for 16 and red for 18. The symbols were again redesigned in 2009.

Description	Symbol
Approved without age restriction in accordance with Art. 14 German Children and Young Persons Protection Act (JuSchG). - Games without age restriction are games which are directly aimed at children and young persons as well as at an adult buyer group.	
Approved for children aged 6 and above in accordance with Art. 14 German Children and Young Persons Protection Act (JuSchG). - These games mostly involve family-friendly games which may be more exciting and competitive (e.g. via faster game speeds and more complex tasks)	
Approved for children aged 12 and above in accordance with Art. 14 German Children and Young Persons Protection Act (JuSchG). - These games feature much more of a competitive edge. Game scenarios contain little violence, enabling players to distance themselves sufficiently from events.	
Approved for children aged 16 and above in accordance with Art. 14 German Children and Young Persons Protection Act (JuSchG). - These games may include acts of strong violence, war themes, and framework story. In multiplayer games, framing can take place through competitions.	
Not approved for young persons in accordance with Art. 14 German Children and Young Persons Protection Act (JuSchG). - These games almost always involve violent game concepts and frequently generate a dark and threatening atmosphere. This makes them suitable for adults only. These games often contain brutal, strong bloody violence and/or glorify war and/or human rights violations.	

Prior to 2008, the rating labels’ size were not universal and often times were the size of the thumbnail. A 2008 amendment to article 12 of the Protection of Young Persons Act introduced a minimum size requirement of 1200 square millimetres on the packaging and of 250 square millimetres on the medium (disc or cartridge) itself. The package label is always affixed to the lower left portion on the front of the packaging. Special exceptions may be granted in cases where the packaging or media happens to be exceptionally small.

=== Content descriptors ===
In January 2023, the USK began using various content descriptors alongside their age ratings. These include descriptors specifying the level of violence, horror, sexual content, profanity and drug and alcohol use.

Name	Official translation	Description
Alkohol	Alcohol	The consumption of alcohol is portrayed positively or frequently.
Angedeutete Gewalt	Implied violence	Violence is depicted in an abstract and unrealistic manner, with no visible physical contact between characters. No damage or injuries are visible when a character is hit.
Belastende Themen	Burdensome themes	The game deals with emotionally stressful themes such as death, bullying and addiction.
Comic-Gewalt	Comic violence	The game depicts cartoon violence in an unrealistic setting, characterized by unrealistic weapons, exaggerated effects and the disappearance of enemies upon defeat.
Derbe Sprache	Explicit language	The game contains profanity considered particularly harsh or vulgar.
Drastische Gewalt	Explicit violence	The game features violence that is "clearly visualized or overly focused".
Drogen	Drugs	The use of drugs is portrayed positively or frequently.
Druck zum Vielspielen	Pressure to play excessively	The game encourages the player to play frequently and/or for an extended period of time, such as via push notifications, season passes, gifts for returning, and penalizing the player for inactivity.
Düstere Atmosphäre	Dark atmosphere	The game features a dark environment which may frighten some players.
Erhöhte Kaufanreize	Increased incentives to buy	The game puts increased pressure on the player to make microtransactions, such as via multiple virtual currencies, pay-to-win mechanics, and notifying the player of the imminent expiration of limited time offers.
Erhöhte Kommunikationsrisiken	Increased communications risks	The game contains unmoderated chat or does not allow players to block or report one another, which may result in "unwanted, inappropriate or offensive communication."
Fantasy-Gewalt	Fantasy violence	Violence is depicted in a fantastical or futuristic setting that is clearly distinguishable from reality.
Gewalt	Violence	Violence may appear realistic or is the main theme of the game.
Glücksspielthematik	Gambling themes	The game contains gambling elements that may promote a positive attitude towards real-life gambling.
Handlungsdruck	Pressure to act	The game puts direct or indirect pressure on the player to take action via stressful situations such as time limits, boss battles, a high number of opponents, rewards for playing frequently, or limited time offers.
Horror		The game features horror themes and effects.
Kontaktrisiken	Contact risks	The game allows players to display personal information such as real names and locations, which may create the risk of unsecure contact.
Kriegsthematik	War themes	The game is set during wartime, and violence is thus an integral part of gameplay.
Problematische Werbeinhalte	Problematic advertising content	The game contains advertising considered "more relevant to the protection of minors" than the game itself.
Schimpfwörter	Occasional swearing	The game contains profanity.
Schreckmomente	Scary moments	Elements featured in the game may frighten some players.
Sexualisierte Gewalt	Sexualised violence	Sexual violence is clearly depicted.
Sexuelle Andeutungen	Sexual innuendo	The game contains sexually suggestive content.
Sexuelle Inhalte	Sexual content	Sex is the main theme of the game, or explicit sexual acts are depicted or alluded to.
Tabakkonsum	Tobacco use	The use of tobacco is portrayed positively or frequently.

=== Additional descriptors ===
In January 2023, the USK also introduced descriptors indicating additional features in the game, such as in-game purchases and online interaction.

Name	Official translation	Description
Chats		The game allows players to communicate via voice chat or text. This does not include pre-written messages or emotes.
In-Game-Käufe	In-game purchases	The game features additional content that can be purchased using real money.
In-Game-Käufe + zufällige Objekte	In-game purchases + random objects	The game features loot boxes or other in-game purchases where the player typically does not know what they will receive until after the transaction.
Standortweitergabe	Location sharing	The game allows players to share their locations with each other.

=== Distinction from the Federal Agency for Child and Youth Protection in the Media ===
The Federal Agency for Child and Youth Protection in the Media (BzKJ) maintains a List of media harmful to young people (colloquially known as the “Index”). Titles that are on this list may only be sold on request to adults 18 or older, are not to be advertised in any media or put on display in retail stores. German retail stores, mail order and internet vendors tend to sell only games that do have a USK rating, due to the massive restrictions. These games are still sold from vendors outside Germany into the German market.

Since April 2003 video games that are rated by the USK are protected from the indexing process. Many publishers and developers choose to release edited versions of their games to try to receive an USK-18-rating, fearing the same negative sales impact an AO rating would have in the US, out of fear that an unrated title might be indexed. Games without an USK rating are treated like an indexed game.

== Restrictions ==
Up through 2018, USK had refused to rate games that contained imagery of anti-constitutional groups, including Nazis, Neo-Nazis, and the Ku Klux Klan, as required by Strafgesetzbuch (German code) section 86a, effectively making them unavailable to purchase in retail channels. While Section 86a included a “social adequacy” clause that allowed such images to be used in areas like education, science, and art (including literature and film), video games were not considered as qualifying under that section USK enforced. To publish affected games in Germany, developers and publishers had to strip out and replace objectionable images. One example is Wolfenstein: The New Order, which replaced swastikas on uniforms with a fictional symbol.

In August 2018, USK announced that the German government would relax this Section 86a restriction on video games, as long as the imagery included falls within the “social adequacy” allowance. USK evaluates how relevant imagery is used and reject games they believe fail to meet the social adequacy allowance. In 2019, the simultaneously released Wolfenstein: Youngblood and Wolfenstein: Cyberpilot were the first games allowed to depict Nazi imagery under the “social adequacy clause”. Despite being officially rated by USK, major German retailers, such as MediaMarkt, Saturn, and GameStop, refused to sell the uncensored version, offering only the separately sold German version without Nazi imagery and references.

Since 2021 games in Germany are mandated to be rated as a prerequisite to being sold on digital platforms with minor access.

== See also ==
- Video game content rating system
- Freiwillige Selbstkontrolle der Filmwirtschaft, the equivalent rating organisation for film
