= Signalis =

2022 video game

- Developer: rose-engine
- Publishers: Humble Games; Playism
- Director: Yuri Stern
- Designers: Barbara Wittmann; Yuri Stern
- Programmer: Yuri Stern
- Artist: Yuri Stern
- Writers: Barbara Wittmann; Yuri Stern
- Composers: 1000 Eyes; Cicada Sirens
- Engine: Unity
- Platforms: Windows; Nintendo Switch; PlayStation 4; Xbox One
- Release: October 27, 2022
- Genre: Survival horror
- Mode: Single-player

Signalis is a 2022 survival horror video game developed by German studio rose-engine and published by Humble Games and Playism. The player controls an android named LSTR-512 (a.k.a. "Elster") as she aims to locate her ship's missing pilot within a mining facility following a supernatural event that caused its resident androids to become hostile. The game is a top-down third-person shooter with occasional puzzle elements.

The game was designed to replicate the graphics and gameplay of fifth generation video games, drawing inspiration from the Silent Hill and Resident Evil series. Additional aesthetic and thematic influence came from various science fiction anime and manga as well as the works of H. P. Lovecraft and Robert W. Chambers, and its plot has been noted as containing yuri themes. Signalis was released for Steam, Nintendo Switch, PlayStation 4, and Xbox One on October 27, 2022. It received generally positive reviews upon release, winning and being nominated for several awards.

== Gameplay ==
Gameplay screenshot

The core gameplay consists of top-down third-person shooter elements with a fixed camera perspective and occasional puzzle elements. Puzzles vary from manipulating switches and dials to searching for certain radio frequencies. The game occasionally switches to a first-person perspective during important story moments.

Elster is limited to six items on her person, including weapons, ammunition, and key items for use in puzzle-solving. There are safe rooms that allow the player to save progress and store their items for future use, and enemies cannot enter these rooms. Elster uses a red laser sight to aim her gun at enemies, and other weapons such as stun batons are available. Once an enemy is incapacitated, Elster can kick it to kill it, although it will get back up unless she uses a thermite flare to burn the corpse.

== Synopsis ==
=== Setting ===
Signalis is set in a retrofuturist world that is governed by the totalitarian Eusan Nation, an interplanetary dictatorship. The Nation employs "Replikas", expendable "biosynthetic clones manufactured to emulate model workers and soldiers". Normal humans, or "Gestalts", are defined in-universe as "a person that is not a Replika". Both Gestalts and Replikas are capable of a wide-ranging psychic power known as "bioresonance" that can manipulate reality, and is heavily used in advanced technology, including the creation of Replikas, despite being poorly understood.

=== Plot ===
The player character, LSTR-512 (a.k.a. "Elster"), is a ship technician Replika unit who awakens in the crashed starship Penrose-512 and begins searching for her missing pilot in order to keep an unspecified promise. She enters S-23 Sierpinski, a decrepit brutalist facility on the planet Leng comprising a labor camp, a reeducation center, and an underground mining operation, and she encounters corrupted Replikas that have undergone physical and mental degeneration. As Elster searches for her shipmate, she uncovers lost memories and forgotten relationships as she enters a recursive time loop, and her surroundings become more illogical and dreamlike the further she travels into S-23 Sierpinski. She encounters many versions of her own corpse from past cycles, indicating that she has been through the time loop many times before.

It is revealed that Elster is in search of a Gestalt named Ariane Yeong. Ariane, a bioresonant, was sent to search for exoplanets in the Penrose alongside Elster, with the two falling in love during the journey. Ariane eventually realized that it was secretly a suicide mission. Due to radiation poisoning from the failing Penrose, Elster attempted to prolong Ariane's life by repeatedly placing her into suspended animation, but eventually died, leaving Ariane asleep. While in stasis, Ariane's powerful telepathy reached Falke, the administrator of S-23 Sierpinski, and overcame both her and the other Replikas, plunging the base into a distorted, shifting reality based on Ariane's subconscious.

The game features multiple endings depending on the actions of the player, all of which are considered equally valid by the developers. There is an initial false ending and three normal endings in which Elster finds the crashed Penrose in an endless red desert underneath S-23 Sierpinski. In the "Leave" ending, Elster does not enter the Penrose and dies; in the "Memory" ending, Elster enters the ship, but realizes Ariane has amnesia, considering the situation "hell", and perishes; and in the "Promise" ending, Elster kills Ariane and puts an end to the situation, dying alongside her. The secret "Artifact" ending is unlocked by finding several keys to unlock a safe containing lilies. Elster sacrifices herself in a ritual using the flowers to summon an unknown artifact. Both Elster and Ariane are then seen dancing together in the Penrose, though the reality of the situation is unclear.

== Development and release ==
Signalis was developed by the two-person German studio rose-engine, comprising Barbara Wittmann and Yuri Stern, with development beginning in 2014. The initial version of the game, created as a university project by Stern and Wittmann, was a 2D side-scrolling shooter game. After seeing positive reception to the initial prototype, Stern and Wittmann began developing the game further and turning it into a top-down horror game. Additional help was brought on through external co-composers.

Narratively and in structure, Signalis is influenced by the Silent Hill and Resident Evil series. Aesthetically the game takes inspiration from the graphics of the fifth generation of video game consoles, particularly from the original PlayStation. Additional aesthetic influence comes from paintings such as The Shore of Oblivion by Eugen Bracht as well as Arnold Böcklin's Isle of the Dead. Visual influences are also taken from anime and manga such as Neon Genesis Evangelion, Blame!, Ghost in the Shell, and Kizumonogatari, as well as the films of Stanley Kubrick. Literary influences include "The Festival" by H. P. Lovecraft and The King in Yellow by Robert W. Chambers. The game's music was co-composed by 1000 Eyes and Cicada Sirens. The game also features classical music such as Frédéric Chopin's "Raindrop Prelude" and Pyotr Ilyich Tchaikovsky's "Swan Lake".

The game was released across multiple platforms on October 27, 2022. It was published by Humble Games and Playism. Signalis has support in English, German, Japanese, Korean, Russian, Simplified Chinese, Latin American Spanish, and French. In February 2024, rose-engine collaborated with the band Health to create a music video for their song "Don't Try" featuring gameplay footage from Signalis.

== Reception ==
Reception

Aggregate scores
Aggregator	Score
Metacritic	NS: 84/100; PC: 81/100; PS4: 80/100; XONE: 82/100
OpenCritic	85%

Review scores
Publication	Score
Destructoid	9.5/10
Eurogamer	Essential
GameSpot	8/10
GamesRadar+	3/5
Hardcore Gamer	4/5
Nintendo Life	9/10
PC Gamer (US)	92/100
Polygon	Recommended
Push Square	8/10
TouchArcade	4.5/5

Signalis received "generally favorable" reviews, according to review aggregator Metacritic, and 85% of critics recommended the game, according to OpenCritic. Critics generally praised the atmosphere and environmental storytelling of the game, although the limited inventory and combat received criticism.

The Verge noted issues with a few puzzles but praised the game for its visuals and horror elements. GameSpot called aiming in the game "unreliable", while Nintendo Life critiqued that the boss fights of the game were not well suited to the combat system. PC Gamer briefly criticized the game's inventory system, yet rated Signalis a 92%, saying the game "joins that coveted pantheon as one of the best in the genre". MetalSucks described the game as "a dark love story caught up in a retrofuture survival horror masterwork". EuroGamer graded Signalis as an "Essential" game, praising its "flawless soundscape" and "slow-burning dread" and describing its tension as "fine-tuned". Similarly, Destructoid described the game as "perilous and emotional, gorgeous and terrifying", and praised elements such as its music, style, and puzzles. Push Square scored the game 8/10, praising its tension, art style, puzzles, and world design.

Polygon criticized the game's difficulty, especially in its final third, saying that the puzzles require "an exhausting amount of backtracking" that hampers the game's pace. However, Polygon praised the game's music and sound design as "impeccable" and said that its visual design is "as acutely strange as it is thoroughly engrossing". Of the game's story, Wired wrote that the "dark narrative hides a fragile, tragic lesbian romance that captivates all who discover it", although critic M.D. Rodrigues criticized the story as opaque and unexciting when compared to the gameplay and atmosphere.

Signalis was included on Polygon's list of the 50 best games of 2022, at spot number 12. Polygon also called it "2022's most unforgettable horror game". Willa Rowe, in a review published by Inverse, referred to the game as the "best horror game of 2022".

=== Accolades ===
Year	Award	Category	Result	Ref.
2023	12th Annual New York Game Awards	Chumley's Speakeasy Award for Best Hidden Gem	Won	
2023	34th GLAAD Media Awards	GLAAD Media Award for Outstanding Video Game	Nominated	
2023	Gayming Awards 2023	Best LGBTQ+ Indie Game Award	Nominated	
2023	Gayming Awards 2023	Authentic Representation Award	Nominated	
2023	Gayming Awards 2023	Best LGBTQ+ Character Award	Nominated	
2023	Stuttgart International Festival of Animated Film	Animated Games Award Germany	Won	
2023	Anifilm International Competition of Computer Games	Best Visual Art	Nominated	
2023	12th International Games and Playful Media Festival	Most Amazing Award	Nominated	
2023	German Computer Game Awards 2023	Best German Game	Nominated	
2023	German Computer Game Awards 2023	Best Debut	Won	
2023	German Computer Game Awards 2023	Best Game Design	Nominated	
2023	German Computer Game Awards 2023	Best Graphic Design	Nominated	
2023	German Computer Game Awards 2023	Best Audio Design	Won	
2023	Horror Game Awards 2023	Horror Game of the Year	Nominated	
2023	Horror Game Awards 2023	Best Character	Nominated	
2023	Horror Game Awards 2023	Best Narrative	Won	
2023	Horror Game Awards 2023	Best Game Design	Nominated	
2023	Horror Game Awards 2023	Best Score/Soundtrack	Nominated	
2023	Horror Game Awards 2023	Best Indie Horror	Won	
2023	German Developer Awards 2023	Best Graphics	Nominated	
2023	German Developer Awards 2023	Best Story	Nominated	
2023	German Developer Awards 2023	Best Indie Game	Nominated	
