= Protection of Young Persons Act (Germany) =

German federal law to protect children and youths

JuSchG
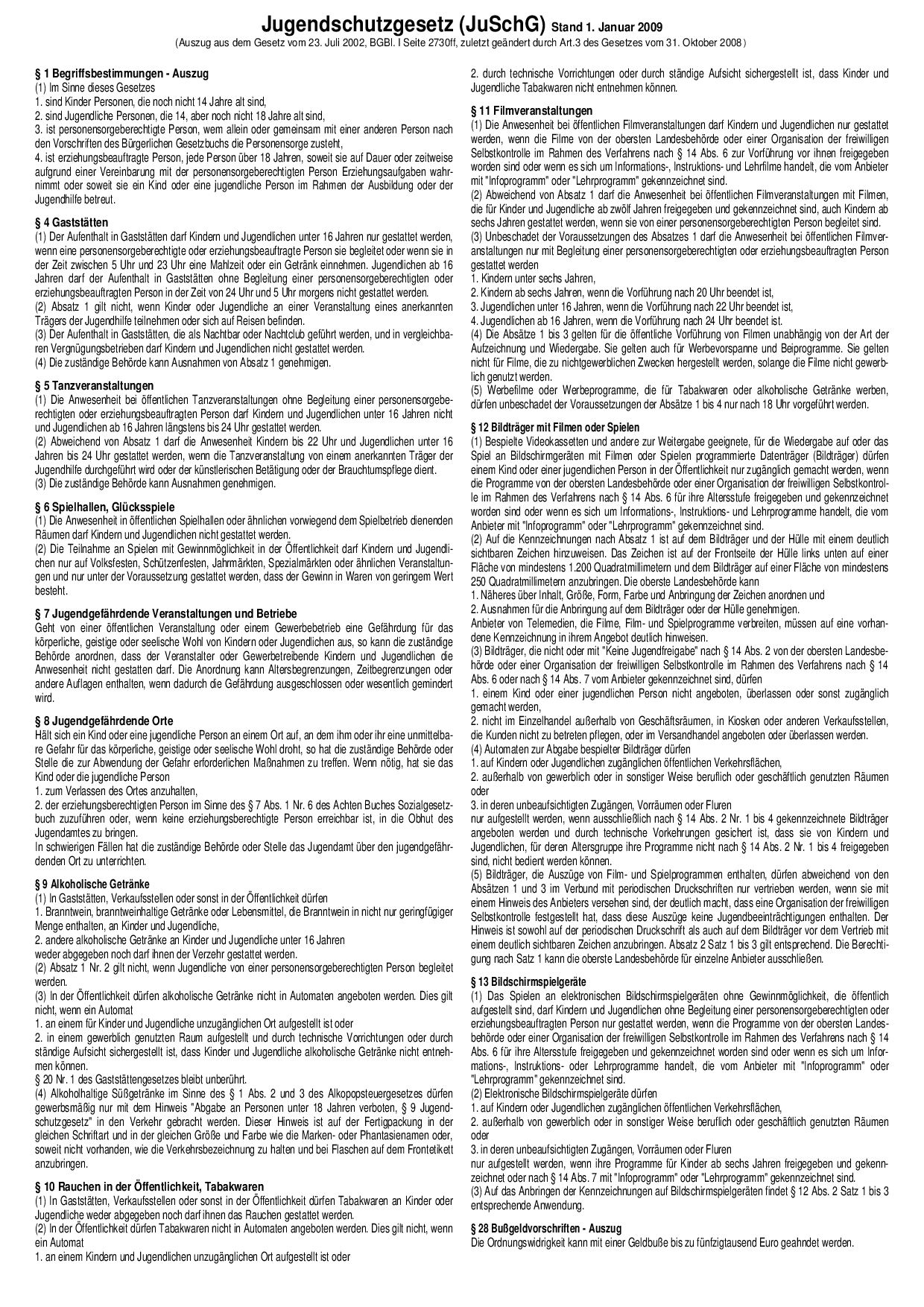
- The Protection of Young Persons Act (2009)

The German Bundestag
- Long title: Jugendschutzgesetz (Protection of Young Persons Act)
- Territorial extent: Federal Republic of Germany
- Passed by: The German Bundestag
- Passed: 4 December 1951
- Enacted: 6 January 1952

Legislative history
- Bill title: Polizeiverordnung zum Schutze der Jugend from 10 June 1943 (RGB. I S. 349); Gesetz zum Schutze der Jugend in der Öffentlichkeit (JÖSchG) from 4 December 1951 (BGB. I S. 936); Jugendschutzgesetz (JuSchG) from 1 April 2003 (BGB 2003 I S. 476)
- Bill citation: Protection of Young Persons Act (Jugendschutzgesetz - JuSchG) [Unofficial English translation]

Amended by
- Amendment by Article 7, Sub-Clause 2, Act of 27 December 2003 [BGBl. I p. 3007], Amendment by Article 3, Act of 29 December 2003 [BGBl. I p. 3076], Amendment by Article 2, Act of 23 July 2004 [BGBl. I p. 1857, 2600], Amendment by Article 2, Act of 27 February 2007 [BGBl. I p. 179, 251], Amendment by Article 3, Act of 20 July 2007 [BGBl. I, p. 1595], Amendment by Act of 24 June 2008 [BGBl. I, p. 1075], Amendment by Article 3, Act of 31 October 2008 [BGBl. I, p. 2149], Amendment by Article 1, Act of 3 March 2016 (BGBl. I p. 369), Amendment by Article 11, Act of 10 March 2017 (BGBl. I p. 420)

Keywords
- Legal drinking age, Alcohol laws, Alcohol laws in Germany, Legal smoking age, Youth rights
- Status: In force

The Protection of Young Persons Act (German: Jugendschutzgesetz or JuSchG) is a federal law in Germany to enforce youth protection in public spaces and regulate media consumption by minors. The act does not apply to minors who are married.

== History ==
=== General history ===
On 4 December 1951 the "Law for the Protection of Minors in Public" (Gesetz zum Schutze der Jugend in der Öffentlichkeit (JÖSchG)) was enacted and came into force on 6 January 1952 in West Germany. The law was revised and re-enacted multiple times until in 2003 the law as well as the former "Gesetz über die Verbreitung jugendgefährdender Schriften und Medieninhalte (GjSM)" were merged into the newly legislated "Jugendschutzgesetz (JuschG)" which came into force along with the "Jugendmedienschutz-Staatsvertrag" in the federal states of Germany.

A forerunner of the law was the "Lichtspielgesetz" from 1920, which restricted the publication of movies in cinemas without former approval and review by a central commission. During the Nazi regime in Nazi Germany, the highly controversial "Polizeiverordnung zum Schutze der Jugend" (Police Ordinance for the Protection of the Youth) came into force, which introduced punishments for the minor as well as the responsible adult failing to follow the regulation of the law. (RGBl. I S. 349). This law was in effect until the newly formed Federal Republic of Germany enacted the new "Law for the Protection of Minors in Public" in 1951.

=== Recent changes ===
- Amendment 1 September 2007: by passing the "Gesetz zum Schutz vor den Gefahren des Passivrauchens" (Act for the prevention of danger by passive smoking) on 20 July 2007 § 28 Sec. 1 Nr. 12 and § 10 Sec. 1 JuSchG where amended. From now on the sale, distribution and supply of tobacco products is prohibited to all children and young people under the age of 18 years. Prior to the amendment the minimum age to purchase, possess and to be permitted to smoke in public was 16 years of age. The operators of cigarette vending machines had time until 1 January 2009 to adjust (by adding an ID/Debitcard scanner to check the buyers age) or remove their machines to ensure that cigarettes and tobacco products could not be bought by minors.
- Amendement 1 July 2008: coming into force on 1 July 2008, a "Killerspiele" (killer games) ban was introduced meaning that from now on media that display "besonders realistische, grausame und reißerische Darstellungen selbstzweckbehafteter Gewalt beinhalten, die das Geschehen beherrschen" (especially realistic, gruesome and luridly depictions of self-inflicted violence which dominates the occurrence) are automatically considered as heavily harmful for minors which results in a general ban to advertise the video game, movie or other form of media and sales are solely restricted to under-the-counter sales for adults. Additionally, the "BPjM" was given power to put games, movies or other type of media onto the index if they:
1. display self-inflicted murder or slaughter scenes or
2. display frontier justice as the only way to enforce the alleged justice
- Amendment 1 January 2009: the restrictions for cigarette vending machines (see above) come into force.
- Amendment 3 March 2016: by passing the "Gesetz zum Schutz von Kindern und Jugendlichen vor den Gefahren des Konsums von elektronischen Zigaretten und elektronischen Shishas" (Act for the prevention of children and young people from the dangers of consuming electronic cigarettes and electronic hookahs) § 10 JuSchG was changed resulting in a ban of sales of e-cigarettes, e-hookahs as well as their cartridges (with and without nicotine) to children and young people under the age of 18 years. This amendment came into force on 1 April 2016.

== Summary ==
The Protection of Young Persons Act regulates:

- how long a minor may stay at specific public spaces such as
  - bars and restaurants
  - clubs/discotheques
  - public spaces, events or establishments which are considered harmful for the youth
  - gambling establishments
- the minimum age to sell to and permit minors to consume alcohol in public.
- the minimum age to sell to and permit minors to consume tobacco products and electronic cigarettes in public.
- the age restrictions for games and movies which have to be enforced by cinemas, public/private broadcasters and stores selling movies and video games.
- responsibility of the Freiwillige Selbstkontrolle der Filmwirtschaft (FSK) and the Unterhaltungssoftware Selbstkontrolle (USK) to issue age ratings for movies and video games.
- responsibility of the Bundesprüfstelle für jugendgefährdende Medien (Federal Department for Media Harmful to Young Persons) to index games, movies or other type of media and restrict sale and distribution. Also to enforce a general advertising ban for media which are considered liable to have an undesirable influence on the moral development of young people, especially media depicting glorification of war, displaying human beings in a way that violates their dignity as well as depiction of children or juveniles in an erotic or sexual manner.

== Table summary ==
Legal source	Image	Description	Age limits		
Legal source	Image	Description	<14 years	<16 years	<18 years
(§4 JuSchG); Licensed premises		Remaining in a restaurant or bar	Restricted^{1,2}		Yes (until 12 a.m)^{2}
(§4 JuSchG); Licensed premises		Remaining in restaurants or bars: visiting an event held by the youth welfare; while travelling	Yes (Unrestricted)		
(§4 JuSchG); Licensed premises		Nightclubs and similar establishments	No		
(§5 JuSchG); Discotheques		Remaining at a discotheques or dancing events	Restricted^{2}		Yes (until 12 a.m.)
(§5 JuSchG); Discotheques		Remaining at a discotheque or dancing event: visiting an event held by the youth welfare; for artistic participation or folklore programmes	Yes (until 10 p.m)	Yes (until 12 a.m)	
(§6 JuSchG); Gambling		Remaining in a gambling establishment and participating in gambling	No		
(§7 JuSchG) JuSchG); Events or premises of undesirable impact on young people		Remaining at events or premises with undesirable impact on young people	No		
(§8 JuSchG); Places with undesirable impact on young people		Remaining at places with undesirable impact on young people	No		
(§9 JuSchG); Alcoholic beverages		Selling, furnishing or permitting consumption of spirits and food products containing spirits above negligible amounts	No		
(§9 JuSchG); Alcoholic beverages		Selling, furnishing or permitting consumption of beer, wine, wine-like beverages or sparkling wine or mixtures of beer, wine, wine-like beverages or sparkling wine and soft drinks	No	Restricted^{3}	Yes
(§10 JuSchG); Tobacco products and e-cigarettes		Selling, furnishing or permitting consumption of tobacco products or e-cigarettes and cartridges (with and without nicotine)	No		
(§11 JuSchG); Movies		Visiting the cinema	Yes (until 8 p.m)^{2,4}	Yes (until 10 p.m)^{2,4}	Yes (until 12 a.m)^{2,4}
(§12 JuSchG); Computer games and movies		Selling or furnishing computer games and movies	Yes^{4}		
(§13 JuSchG); Arcades		Using electronic arcade machines	Yes^{4}		

^{1} Unaccompanied children <16 years only permitted in a restaurant or licensed premises during the time of 5 a.m until 11 p.m. to consume a meal or a have a non alcoholic beverage.
^{2} No restrictions if accompanied by a parent or legal guardian.
^{3} The consumption of beer, wine, wine-like beverages or sparkling wine or mixtures of beer, wine, wine-like beverages or sparkling wine and soft drinks in public is generally permitted for minors aged 16 years or older. However, if the minor is accompanied by his parent or legal guardian the age limit the consume such beverages drops down to 14 years.
^{4} If specific age-limit for movies/games/arcades are followed.

== Enforcement ==
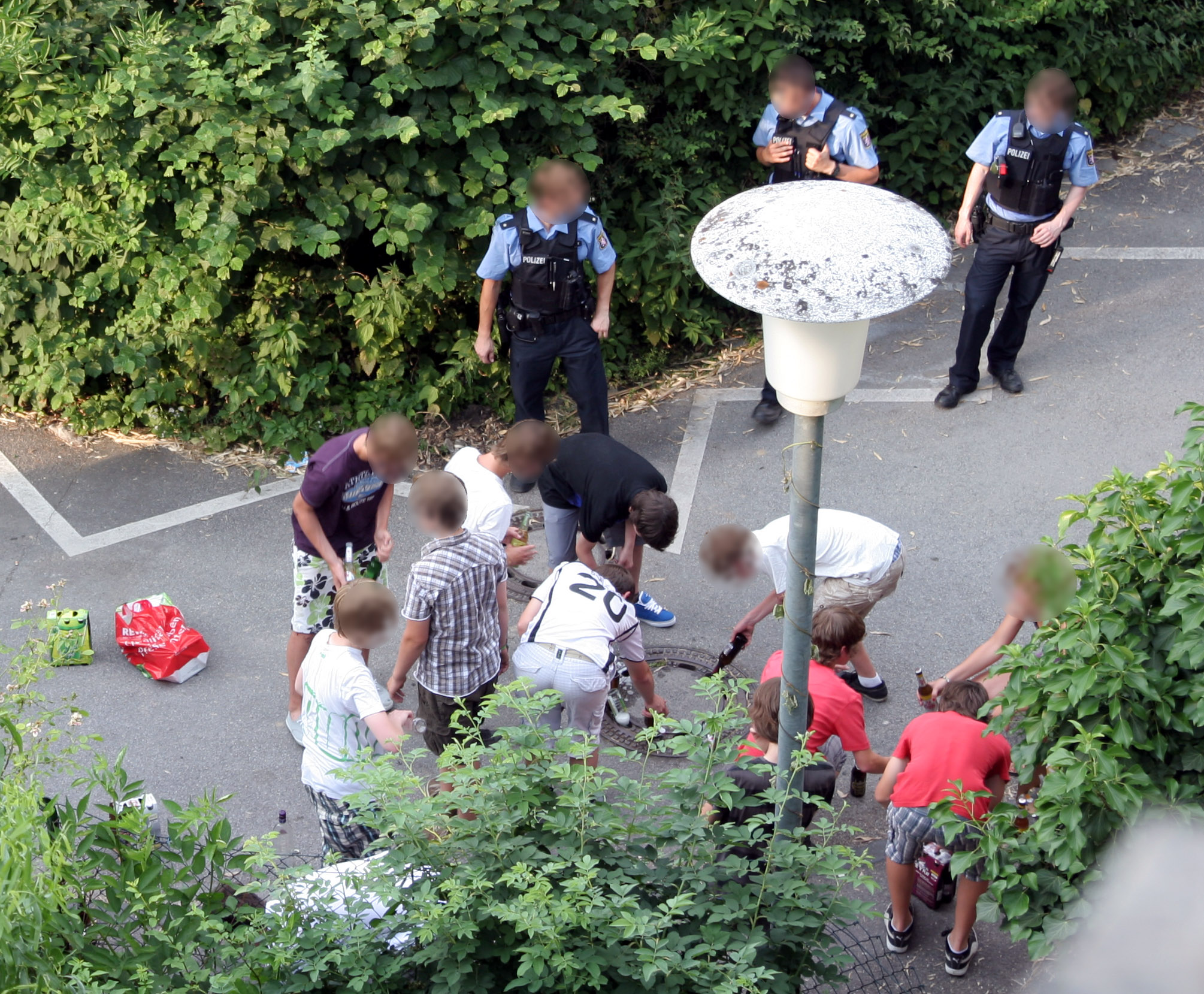
Police operation in Bensheim, Hesse. Several minors have to dispose of illegally-obtained alcohol.

Contrary to the former "Polizeiverordnung zum Schutze der Jugend", the "Jugendschutzgesetz" does not penalize children and young people but rather the responsible adult failing to enforce the provisions of the law. All licensed premises and operators of events have to place a clearly-legible copy of the act at the premises or place of event.

Making media which is indexed for being considered "harmful to young persons" accessible to minors as well as violating further provisions which are set out in § 15, 21 and 28 JuSchG can be prosecuted by imprisonment up to one year or a fine.

Violations in context of protection of young persons in the public are considered a misdemeanor/regulatory offence, which can be fined up to €50,000.

== Gambling in casinos ==
Gambling in a licensed casino (Spielbank) is additionally to the general prohibition for minors to participate in gambling by the Protection of Young Persons Act, prohibited by state law in all German states. The age limit varies with 13 out of 16 states requiring a minimum age of 18 years to participate in gambling and enter a licensed casino. However Bavaria, Baden-Württemberg and Lower Saxony are exceptions, as they require a minimum age of 21 years.

== Aspects which are not covered by the law ==
- The age restrictions for the sale and furnishment of fireworks and other pyrotechnical items is not covered by the Protection of Young Persons Act but rather by the Verordnung zum Sprengstoffgesetz (Ordinance for the Explosives Act).
- Contrary to popular belief, the Protection of Young Persons Act does not include a general curfew but rather restricts minors from entering or staying at certain establishments or location which are open to the public (such as bars, discotheques, brothels and nightclubs). How long a minor is permitted to stay in public (besides mentioned establishments) is generally upon the parents' decision.
- Even though all sales of tobacco products are prohibited to minors, since 1 September 2007, the sale of smoking accessories such as bongs, hookahs, cigarette papers, lighters, pipes or herb grinders is not regulated, and thus sale is permitted to minors. However, in Bavaria, the sale of lighters is prohibited to children under the age of 12 years. Additionally, many retailers such as Rewe or Edeka have their own guidelines that restrict the sale of smoking accessories to children under 16 or 18 years of age.

== Literature ==
- Manfred Günther: Child and Youth Welfare Law in Germany. An overview for educators, psychologists, paediatricians and politicians, Springer Nature Wiesbaden 2022. ISBN 978-3-658-38289-6; E-book 978-3-658-3829-2
