= Lost Ember =

2019 video game

- Developer: Mooneye Studios
- Publisher: Mooneye Studios
- Engine: Unreal Engine 4
- Platforms: Microsoft Windows, Nintendo Switch, PlayStation 4, Xbox One
- Release: PlayStation 4, Xbox One, Windows: WW: November 22, 2019; Nintendo Switch: WW: September 24, 2020
- Genre: Adventure game
- Mode: Single-player

Lost Ember is an adventure game developed by German company Mooneye Studios and released in 2019. Players explore the ruins of a lost civilization by possessing various animals. A VR version of the game was released on July 12, 2022 only for the PC. A remaster for the game Lost Ember: Rekindled Edition was released in Nov 27, 2025. Mooneye studios promised Steam players a free upgrade, otherwise it was also available on Playstation 4/5 through the PlayStation Store, and on Xbox Series X|S with Xbox Play Anywhere support.

== Gameplay ==
Lost Ember is a third-person adventure game. Players control a wolf. A spirit asks the player for help in reaching the afterlife and explains that people disqualified from entering the afterlife are reincarnated as animals. The player and the spirit set off to find out why the player is barred from the afterlife and to assist the spirit. The game does not have traditional puzzles, though players may encounter impassable terrain. To continue, players can possess other animals they encounter. Possessing a bird allows players to fly over terrain inaccessible to the wolf, and fish can swim across lakes. By exploring nearby ruins, the player and spirit learn more about their past lives and the civilization they came from. Unlocking these memories allows them to progress through the game and enter the afterlife.

== Plot ==
The Yanren tribe's faith teaches that righteous followers will be welcomed into a blissful afterlife, called the City of Light. However, those who have gravely sinned are called "lost embers" and are believed to be reincarnated as wild beasts.

A lost soul, visualized as a small flying orb of light, wanders the earth for several years looking for an earthly creature to help him, until he finds a wolf who silently listens to him and follows him. A red barrier is preventing him from reaching the City of Light and he has amnesia, but they jog one of his memories after reading the name "Kalani" written on an amulet found on a human skeleton. The spirit of Kalani appears and says to them "It's time you reach the light you long for, this lost ember needs your help". The orb deduces that the wolf is Kalani reincarnated, and that she is a "lost ember" who committed sins in life.

The barriers between them and the City of Light continue to break as they unlock more memories; over time, the wolf and the orb learn that Kalani was a Yanren girl who became disillusioned with the Yanren Emperor due to the widespread poverty, hunger and pestilence that were affecting the Yanren people under his leadership. Kalani's lover Wayla was in very poor health too, and bedridden in Kalani's house. Kalani resorted to armed robbery and later violent revolution against the Emperor to try to provide for the Yanren's forgotten poor, but Wayla disapproved of her methods and urged her to appeal to the Emperor non-violently. When Kalani led an angry mob to the Emperor's palace, her own father Atevo (a member of the Emperor's own Sinchi Guard) allowed the rest of the Sinchi Guard to violently quash the dissent, saying "You didn't leave me any choice". The Sinchi Guard burned down a large portion of the village, killing the bedridden Wayla in the process. Atevo attempts to apologize to Kalani at Wayla's funeral, but she renounces him. Kalani continues her violent revolution, which cumulated in her army destroying their holiest Temple of Light along with the rest of the city, and nearly killing the Emperor. The orb is so angry with her that he flees, but the wolf runs after him in sorrow and he agrees to keep helping her.

Atevo confronted Kalani in private, and gave his daughter one last chance to flee despite the Emperor demanding her head. In the present, the orb believes the wolf can plead for God's forgiveness at the Temple of the Sun, atop the highest mountain in the region. Their path was the same one Kalani took several years ago, when she purposely lured her Sinchi Guard pursuers (including Atevo) through the Emperor's secret gemstone mine and a mass grave of Machu'ruku (an earlier tribe that was revered and looked up to in Yanren folklore) to make them understand the Emperor's misdeeds. The orb eventually realizes that he is the lost soul of Atevo, and this time, the wolf flees from him in anger but they again reconcile.

Atop the mountain, they unlock another memory that showed Atevo demanding Kalani follow him to turn herself in, and when she refused, they got in a push-and-shove argument in which Atevo accidentally pushed Kalani off a cliff to her death. When all was said and done, a regretful Atevo alone gave Kalani a solemn burial at sea. When Atevo (in orb form) accepts that he was the "lost ember" in need of redemption, the City of Light appears before them. He and the wolf run towards it, but it shatters as an illusion when they reach the gate. The spirit of Kalani appears before them again, and Atevo realizes that the wolf was not her reincarnation, but a wolf that Kalani had rescued on the mountain as a pup. Kalani and Atevo's spirits ascend to the actual City of Light (on the surface of the sun) while the wolf looks on and watches them fade into the sunrise.

== Development ==
Mooneye Studios successfully crowdfunded Lost Ember in 2016. It was released in late 2019 for Windows, PlayStation 4, and Xbox One. It was ported to Nintendo Switch in September 2020.

== Reception ==
Luke Kemp of PC Gamer rated the game 90/100 and called it "a wonderful, unique, and unforgettable experience with a love for nature". Richard Hoover reviewed the game for Adventure Gamers and rated it 3/5 stars. He wrote, "Lost Ember's animal body possession provides some fun moments but the lack of anything substantive to do with it makes for a beautiful but surprisingly empty experience." Reviewing the PlayStation 4 version, Jon Bailes of Polygon criticized the game's performance. Although he said Lost Ember becomes more enjoyable later on, Bailes compared it negatively to Journey and said that Lost Ember "takes way too long to get flowing properly". Brett Posner-Ferdman, who reviewed the Nintendo Switch version for Nintendo Life, also criticized the game's performance. He rated it 4/10 stars and wrote that the game "fails to deliver on nearly every front".
