= Prelude, Op. 28, No. 15 (Chopin) =

1839 piano composition by Frédéric Chopin

- by Frédéric Chopin
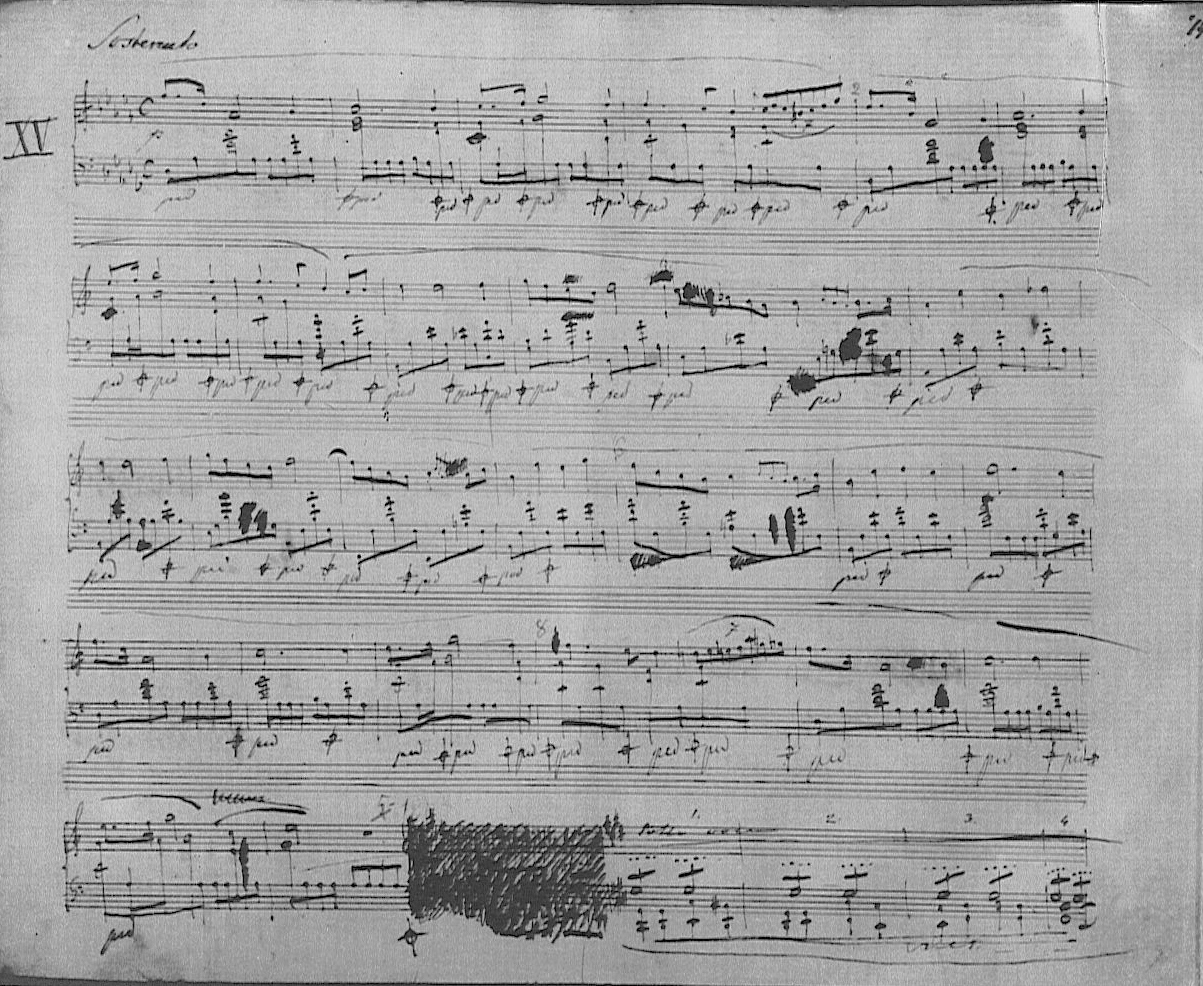
- Prelude 15, page 1 (autograph)
- Key: D♭ major
- Published: 1839
- Prelude Op. 28, No. 15 in D ♭ major performed by Giorgi Latso

The Prelude Op. 28, No. 15, by Frédéric Chopin, known as the "Raindrop" prelude, is one of the 24 Chopin preludes. It is one of Chopin's most famous works. Usually lasting between five and seven minutes, this is the longest of the preludes. The prelude is noted for its repeating A♭, which appears throughout the piece and sounds like raindrops to many listeners.

== Composition ==
Some of Op. 28 was written during Chopin's and George Sand's stay at a monastery in Valldemossa, Mallorca in 1838. In her Histoire de ma vie (Story of My Life), Sand related how one evening she and her son Maurice, returning from Palma during a heavy rainstorm, found a distraught Chopin, who exclaimed, "Ah! I knew well that you were dead." While playing his piano he had a dream:

He saw himself drowned in a lake. Heavy drops of icy water fell in a regular rhythm on his breast, and when I made him listen to the sound of the drops of water indeed falling in rhythm on the roof, (Note: Robert Graves wrote, "This proves to have been impossible; it must have been the rain dripping from the roof into the garden." Winter in Majorca, translated and annotated by Robert Graves (1956). Pg 171.) he denied having heard it. He was even angry that I should interpret this in terms of imitative sounds. He protested with all his might—and he was right to—against the childishness of such aural imitations. His genius was filled with the mysterious sounds of nature, but transformed into sublime equivalents in musical thought, and not through slavish imitation of the actual external sounds.

Sand did not say which prelude Chopin played for her on that occasion, but most music critics assume it was no. 15, because of the repeating A♭, with its suggestion of the "gentle patter" of rain. However, Peter Dayan points out that Sand accepted Chopin's protest that the prelude was not an imitation of the sound of raindrops but a translation of nature's harmonies within Chopin's "génie". Frederick Niecks says that in the prelude's middle section there "rises before one's mind the cloistered court of the monastery of Valldemossa, and a procession of monks chanting lugubrious prayers, and carrying in the dark hours of night their departed brother to his last resting-place."

== Description ==
Measures 1–4 of Chopin's Prelude in D♭ Major, Op. 28, No. 15 ("Raindrop"). Urtext edition.

The prelude opens with a "serene" theme in D♭. It then changes to a "lugubrious interlude" in C♯ minor, "with the dominant pedal never ceasing, a basso ostinato". The repeating A♭/G♯, which has been heard throughout the first section, here becomes more insistent.

After this, the prelude ends with the original theme. Frederick Niecks says, "This C♯ minor portion... affects one like an oppressive dream; the reentrance of the opening D♭ major, which dispels the dreadful nightmare, comes upon one with the smiling freshness of dear, familiar nature—only after these horrors of the imagination can its serene beauty be fully appreciated."

== In popular culture ==
In the 1979 James Bond film Moonraker, when Bond first meets his antagonist, Hugo Drax, at his estate, Drax is playing this prelude.

In Akira Kurosawa's Dreams, the prelude intermittently plays for about seven and a half minutes in the segment showing Vincent van Gogh paintings in an art gallery, slightly more than halfway through the movie.

During the marketing campaign of Halo 3 in 2007, the piece was used in the "Halo: Believe." advertisement video as music accompanying diorama depictions of the Human-Covenant war.

It appears extensively throughout Ridley Scott's Prometheus in both its original form and as quotations in the score.

In 2022, the video game Fall Guys revealed a trailer for Halo skins, in which developer Mediatonic used the prelude in a parody of the Halo 3 "Believe" trailer.

In the 2022 video game Signalis, a snippet of the piece plays during the opening cutscene and later in the game. It is also used in the game's announcement trailer. The same snippet is covered in the track "The Promise" by 1000 Eyes and Tom Schley on the Signalis Original Soundtrack for the game.

In 2022, the video game Risk of Rain 2—developed by Hopoo Games—release its second DLC, Survivors of the Void, which introduced a new game mode, The Simulacrum. An arrangement of this prelude by Chris Christodoulou can be heard within the character select menu of the new game mode.
