= Spells & Secrets =

2023 video game

- Developer: Alchemist Interactive
- Publishers: Rokaplay; Merge Games (consoles)
- Director: Roman Matuszczak
- Engine: Unity
- Platforms: Windows; PlayStation 5; Xbox Series X/S; Nintendo Switch
- Release: 9 November 2023
- Genre: Roguelike
- Modes: Single-player, multiplayer

Spells & Secrets is a roguelike game developed by Alchemist Interactive and published by Rokaplay and Merge Games. It was released on 9 November 2023 for Microsoft Windows, PlayStation 5, Xbox Series X/S and Nintendo Switch.

== Gameplay ==
Spells & Secret is an isometric roguelike (self described rogue-lite) game set in procedurally-generated wizard academy Greifenstein. The player controls a student fighting magical creatures using physics-based spells. It features a cooperative mode and character creator.

== Development ==
Spells & Secrets was developed by Düsseldorf, Germany-based studio Alchemist Interactive (formerly Lemonbomb Entertainment, developers of Stranded Sails) and published by Rokaplay and Merge Games for consoles. It was crowdfunded on Kickstarter in April 2022 and was shown at Future of Play Direct at E3 2022. An early access version was planned for summer 2022.

The game was released on 9 November 2023 for Microsoft Windows, PlayStation 5 and Nintendo Switch. The Xbox Series X/S was delayed to a later date.
