= Lonely Mountains: Downhill =

2019 video game

- Developer: Megagon Industries
- Publisher: Thunderful
- Engine: Unity
- Platforms: PlayStation 4; Windows; Xbox One; Nintendo Switch
- Release: PS4, Windows, Xbox One; October 23, 2019; Nintendo Switch; May 7, 2020
- Genre: Sports
- Mode: Single-player

Lonely Mountains: Downhill is a 2019 sports video game developed by German developer Megagon Industries and published by Thunderful. The game is a third-person biking game, where the player tries to complete courses on different mountains. The game was released on October 23, 2019, for PlayStation 4, Xbox One, and Microsoft Windows. A Nintendo Switch port was released in May 2020.

A sequel, titled Lonely Mountains: Snow Riders, was released in January 2025.

== Gameplay ==
The game uses a fixed camera that follows the player down the mountain.

Lonely Mountains: Downhill is a mountain biking game where the goal is to complete each track. Each track is made up of segments that serve as checkpoints and the game will give you the time for each individual section. The player can die by either falling off a cliff, or hitting obstacles like trees and rocks. The base game has four mountains to choose from, each with a unique theme and different terrain styles. Alongside this, an additional mountain was added through DLC. Every mountain has four trails to ride that feature different parts of the mountain.

The player can also customize their bike, adding different parts that can affect stabilization, speed and control. Completing challenges will unlock new parts and up to six bikes alongside allowing for new outfits for the character, such as a different t-shirt or helmet.

== Development ==
Lonely Mountains: Downhill started development in 2015 in Berlin. The team were inspired by a mobile game called Skiing Yeti Mountain, saying that it was "simple, but has incredible tight controls". The director also noted Danny Macaskill's The Ridge as a major inspiration. The visual style was inspired by Lara Croft Go and Monument Valley. The low-poly aesthetic was additionally chosen to make the game's world more readable to the player. Downhill was originally intended to be a racing game in which players would drive trucks down a mountain. One of the developers was a mountain biker, who convinced the director to change the focus to biking. The studio had previously exclusively released mobile games, and Lonely Mountains: Downhill was also intended for the platform. After positive feedback, and requests for a console/PC version, the studio tested out gamepad controls, and they felt it improved the experience drastically. As a result, development shifted to PC and consoles. The developers mentioned wanting to create a challenging game without AI opponents. The developer said "Instead, we wanted to offer this romantic fantasy of a nature untouched by men." The mountains in the game were inspired by real places, but were designed to focus on being enjoyable to play over being realistic. They also wanted to create visually distinct mountains and trails so the player could memorize and learn them easier.

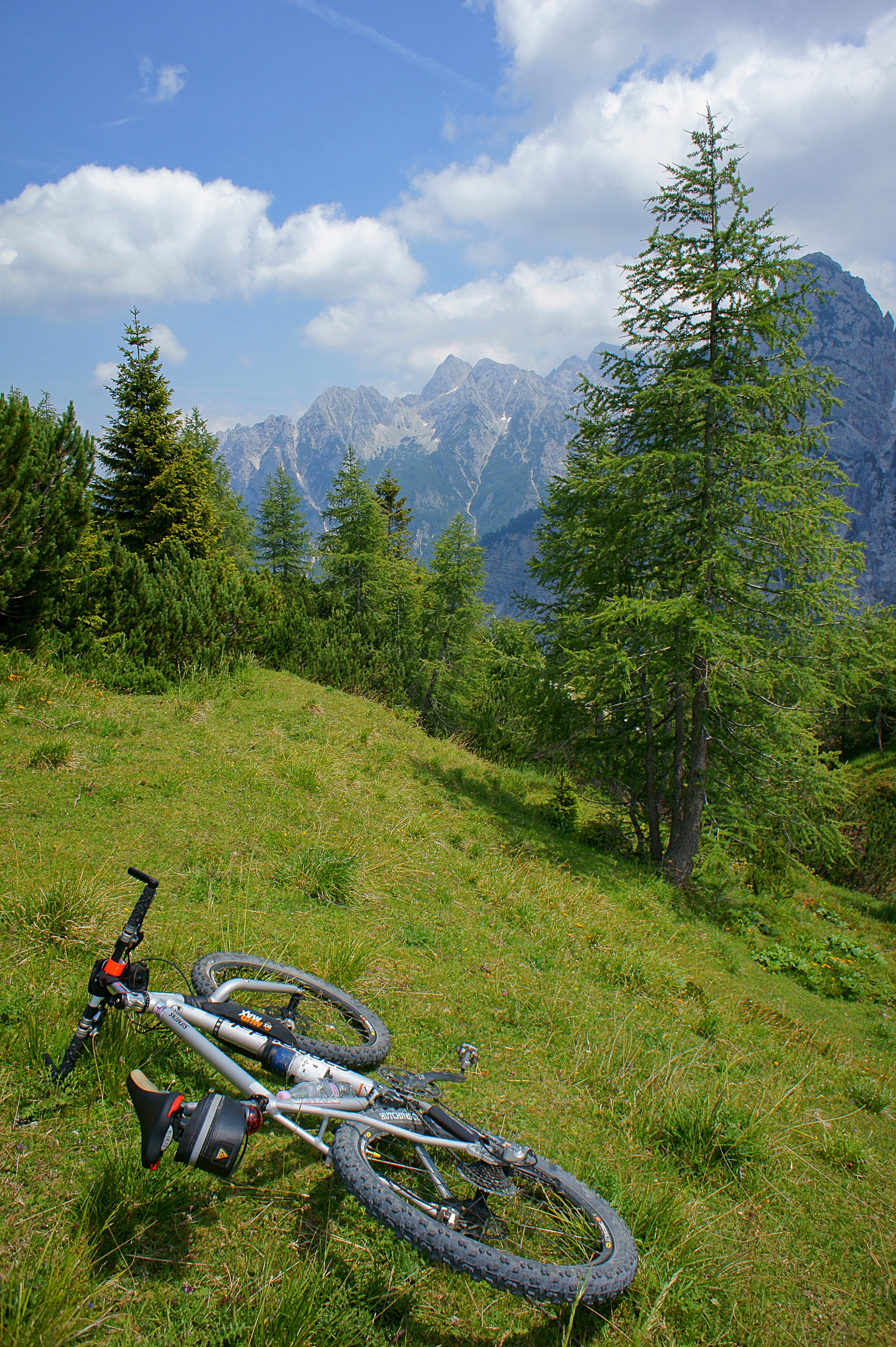
Megagon used mountain biking as inspiration for the game.

The first year of development was mostly spent tuning the bike's controls and physics in order to get it to feel right, focusing on simplicity and ease of use. A large amount of time was also spent on making the animations and audio feel right for each bike. Megagon originally intended to fake bike movement using colliders and motion, but found that it would be less work to accurately simulate a bike than to fake it. The team would begin by blocking out a level using a custom terrain editor, then adding details trees and particle effects. The rider and the animations were made in Autodesk Maya, while environmental assets were created with Blender. The game has a dynamic audio system that takes momentum, type of bike, terrain, and player movement in order to create bike sounds. The respawn system was inspired by Super Meat Boy, with instant restarts so that players could quickly start trying again. The trail design was focused on allowing players to take risks and to incentivizing them to get faster times. Although the player could unlock most things by sticking to the trail, they could save times by going off trail and get rewarded with new bike parts and cosmetic items. The developers defined three different types of trails in the game: official trails, the main path the player is supposed to follow, the semi-official trails, that let players take a shortcut, at the cost of being more difficult, and unofficial trails, ones that the developers had no control over, but were made possible by the physics system. The game does not allow for tricks or camera movement, because Megagon wanted the player can keep focused on controlling the bike and the trail. Different control systems were tried, with one that was relative to the screen and one that was relative to the bike. They found that different people preferred both equally, so they were kept in the game.

The director thought that being a small team allowed them to iterate quickly on mechanics and ideas. The game also received funding from Medienboard Berlin-Brandenburg. The team partnered with Thunderful to publish and market the game. Retroid Interactive created the console versions of the game. It was announced in a 2016 post on indie game forum TIGSource. Megagon planned to get the game on Steam Greenlight, and set a release date of mid-2018. Megagon Industries launched a Kickstarter for the game on October 17, 2017, with a funding goal of €35,000. The game was released on October 22, 2019, for PS4, with Xbox One and Microsoft Windows versions launching the next day. The Eldfjall Island DLC was released on October 22, 2020.

== Reception ==
Reception

Aggregate score
| Aggregator | Score |
|---|---|
| Metacritic | NS: 84/100; XB1: 79/100; PS4: 80/100; PC: 80/100 |

Review scores
| Publication | Score |
|---|---|
| Edge | 7/10 |
| Eurogamer | Recommended |
| Game Informer | 8.75/10 |
| Nintendo Life | 9/10 |
| Nintendo World Report | 9/10 |
| PlayStation Official Magazine – UK | 8/10 |
| Official Xbox Magazine (UK) | 8/10 |

Lonely Mountains: Downhill received "generally favorable reviews" according to Metacritic.

Game Informer's Matt Miller gave the game a positive review, in particular praising the controls. "The bikes control like a dream, with quick-turning, believable acceleration arcs and lots of variance". He criticized the slow unlock process, as it limited the bikes able to be used until the end of the game.

David Lloyd of Nintendo World Report enjoyed the options Downhill presented, giving players the option to take risks and shortcuts in order to improve their times. He also liked the visuals, writing "The trails are visually stunning, with a gorgeous amount of detail in the trees and streams in particular".

Christian Donlan, writing for Eurogamer praised the game's lack of music, saying that he loved "the way there's no music to distract you from the soundtrack of the lonely biker, the burr of a distant woodpecker, the ticking of the bike chain". He also enjoyed the low-poly art style mentioning that "There is a soaring artistry at work in the way the low-poly landscapes you race through are put together".

Nintendo Life's Jon Mundy liked Downhill's controls and bike feel, writing "it perfectly nails the sensation of pedal-powered locomotion without feeling arcane or restrictive." He criticized the performance of the game on Nintendo Switch saying that "we noted numerous instances of slowdown" and "even the odd lengthy pause slap bang in the middle of a run".

== Sequel ==
A sequel, Lonely Mountains: Snow Riders, was released on January 21, 2025, on Steam and Xbox Series X and Series S. It introduced cooperative gameplay and online multiplayer.
