= Tiny & Big in Grandpa's Leftovers =

2012 video game

- Cover art by Sebastian Stamm
- Developer: Black Pants Game Studio
- Publisher: Black Pants Game Studio
- Artist: Sebastian Stamm
- Engine: Scape Engine
- Platforms: Windows; Mac OS X; Linux
- Release: June 19, 2012
- Genre: Puzzle-platform
- Mode: Single-player

Tiny & Big in Grandpa's Leftovers is a 2012 puzzle-platform game developed and published by German indie team Black Pants Game Studio. Originally released as a tech demo titled Tiny & Big: Up That Mountain in March 2010, the game was expanded into a full release, with the retail version appearing on Microsoft Windows, Mac OS X and Linux on June 19, 2012. Billed as a "jump and slice platformer," the player is tasked with manipulating levels with a selection of tools to solve 3D environmental puzzles. The game's story focuses on Tiny, an inventor, on a mission to retrieve his prized possession, a magic-imbued pair of briefs left to him by his disappeared grandfather, from his "sandbox rival" Big, who intends to use them to rule the world.

== Gameplay ==
As Tiny, the player progresses through the game's levels using "the Tool," an invention of Tiny's containing three key functions: a laser strong enough to cut through solid rock, a grappling rope for pulling objects toward the player, and a rocket for pushing items forward based on where on the item it lands. The combination of these actions forms the bulk of the gameplay, acting as the primary means of navigating the game's environments as well as being Tiny's main method of self-defense from attacks from Big. Tiny is also accompanied by the Radio, an artificial intelligence attached to a speaker in his rucksack; the Radio acts as a mentor to the player, providing prompts when needed to progress.

== Plot ==
As the game opens, Tiny and the Radio are traveling by taxi into the "mysterious desert," where Tiny plans to confront Big over control of the Pants. The taxi is struck by an unknown object, leading the robotic driver to spin out of control and into a canyon. Tiny, unsettled by the crash but unscathed, collects his belongings from the crash site and attempts to continue on foot before being stopped by a cliff. Before getting the chance to think of an alternate way through, Big appears behind him, kicking him off of the cliff face.

Tiny lands in front of a massive statue, which he uses the interior and exterior of to climb upward. Along the way Big uses his Pants-powered ability to leap long distances to taunt him, leading for the entire structure to collapse behind the two. Big reveals his plan to enter a nearby pyramid to strengthen his powers, and Tiny and the Radio give chase while Big uses the Pants' telekinesis with increasingly deadly force to keep them at bay, lifting the pyramid into the sky as the chase goes on.

As Tiny and Radio pursue Big into the pyramid, they discover the origin of the Pants from the paintings on the walls of the pyramid. The Pants, which were once a normal pair of underwear, were struck by lightning and found by the Dotties, a race of mole-like creatures living in the ground; one of the creatures places the Pants on his head and gains superpowers from them, leading the others to worship him as a king. Under the eye of the leader, the Dotties are initially prosperous, forming a civilization with the pyramid and statue. Over time, though, the king is driven further into insanity by the Pants, eventually wiping out the entire population with their power.

Meanwhile, Big discovers the king's throne and sits atop it, reactivating a set of pyres within the pyramid. Fearing the possibilities of what might happen if Big keeps the Pants, Tiny and the Radio enter the king's lair and destroy the pyres, which causes the pyramid to collapse on itself. Big and Tiny have a final duel atop the floating pieces of the pyramid, which culminates in Tiny slicing a boulder over Big's head, incapacitating him.

As the wreckage of the pyramid lands, both boys wake up on the ground with the Pants laying near both over a Dottie hole. The two bicker over who their grandfather intended to be rightful owner of the pants, but before either gets the chance to grab them a Dottie surfaces from the ground and places them over its head. Knowing the entire process is going to happen again but lacking the item that drove their conflict, Big and Tiny form an unspoken truce, continuing to argue as they walk into the sunset together.

== Reception ==
The game received a Metacritic score of 75, indicating "generally favorable reviews" from a selection of 30 reviewers. In a positive review, PC Gamer UK’s Duncan Geere called the game's art style "adorable," likening the visuals to Double Fine's Psychonauts; the review would also commend the game for going "out of its way to put you in situations where lasering things in half feels awesome," though Geere was also concerned about the possibility of getting lost due to the freedom given to the player and felt the game was short for its retail price. Game Informer's Adam Biessener praised the degree of freedom provided by the game's laser, stating, "Your power over the game world is immense." Biessener was, however, more critical of the game's length, occasional bugs, and boss fights, calling the final fight with Big a "lame rehash of the same mechanics you’ve conquered several times."

Reviewing for Destructoid, Allistair Pinstof noted that the game "runs out [of] ideas before its half-way point" and included moments where "you'll wish the game was either a little more tightly designed or a little more forgiving," but praised the game for its soundtrack and the charm of its aesthetic and comedy, stating, "If Tiny & Big were a cartoon, it could easily occupy a time slot between Regular Show and Adventure Time." IGN's Anthony Gallegos felt similarly, noting that "the look of Tiny and Big feels like someone took the cartoon Adventure Time and put it into the Borderlands engine."

The game won the Unity Development Award at indiePub's 2011 Independent Propeller Awards, although it was not developed in Unity.
