= The Great Jitters: Pudding Panic =

2011 video game

- Developer: kunst-stoff GmbH
- Publisher: kunst-stoff GmbH
- Platforms: iOS, Android, Windows, macOS
- Release: June 7, 2011
- Genre: Action

The Great Jitters: Pudding Panic is an iOS action game developed by the German studio kunst-stoff GmbH and released on June 7 in 2011.

== Critical reception ==
The game has a rating of 91% on Metacritic based on 9 critic reviews. It was (as of 2012) downloaded more than 400,000 times. The Great Jitters was nominated in two categories for the German Computer Games Prize (DCP) and won the Best Children's Game category. The game has a Metacritic score of 91 % and is listed there as #36 of the best iPhone games of all times. It also received the Red Dot Design Award in 2011.

AppSpy said "Scared of haunted house rides? Don't worry, helping out Jitters in Pudding Panic is fun and cathartic whether you love or hate the staple carnival ride. " SlideToPlay said "This spooky, weird puzzle game is like a tasty dessert." AppSafari wrote "In all, I really liked the look, the tone the game set, and the monster designs. The gameplay is unique and for this low price Pudding Panic is a great buy." AppGamer said "Pudding Panic seems to have created a genre that has never been seen before on the App Store. Whilst being an action packed cartoon thriller, it is also a relaxing puzzler that doesn't demand too much from the gamer. A simple concept with appropriate presentation makes this a top App." AppSmile described it as "A concept that feels fresh and fun, making for an enjoyable experience for gamers young and old." Pocket Gamer UK wrote "Utterly intense, but ridiculously addictive at the same time, Pudding Panic's marriage of fear and food delivers a puzzler without comparison on iPhone." 148Apps wrote "Even if your not a fan of desserts that jiggle or haunted houses, this game is sure to have something to make you smile." Gamezebo said "While an inaccurate title though, Pudding Panic delivers where it counts, which is in the fun department."
