= Ken Follett's The Pillars of the Earth =

2017 video game

- Developer: Daedalic Entertainment
- Publisher: Daedalic Entertainment
- Directors: Matthias Kempke; Kevin Mentz
- Producers: Caspar Michel; Matthias Kempke
- Designers: Matthias Kempke; Kevin Mentz; Valentina Tamer
- Programmer: Thorben Kohler
- Writers: Matthias Kempke; Kevin Mentz
- Composer: Tilo Alpermann
- Platforms: Linux; macOS; Windows; Nintendo Switch; PlayStation 4; Xbox One; iOS; Amazon Luna
- Release: Linux, macOS, Windows, PlayStation 4, Xbox One; Book 1: 13 August 2017; Book 2: 13 December 2017; Book 3: 29 March 2018 iOS (all Books) 4 April 2018; Amazon Luna (all Books) 20 October 2020; Nintendo Switch (all Books) 2 March 2023
- Genre: Point-and-click adventure
- Mode: Single-player

Ken Follett's The Pillars of the Earth (German: Die Säulen der Erde) is a 2017 point-and-click adventure episodic video game by Daedalic Entertainment. It is based on Welsh author Ken Follett's 1989 novel of the same name. Book 1 of the game was released on 16 August 2017, Book 2 on 13 December 2017, and Book 3 on 29 March 2018.

== Gameplay ==
The Pillars of the Earth follows the principles of a classic point-and-click adventure: the user controls one of three main characters as they travel across highly detailed backgrounds as the plot continues. The game is almost exclusively controlled by mouse. The player holds the left mouse button over objects or characters to bring up an interaction menu with "look", "talk", and "use" options. The player may hold the space bar to have the interactive portions of the world, such as objects, highlighted. This shows differently coloured indicators for objects, characters, and travel points. The game also features an inventory screen accessed by the right mouse button. Objects gathered from the world are stored in the character's backpack, which are then used in the world and/or combined with other items to solve puzzles and advance the story. In addition, the game includes minigames, where characters interact in real time with some element in their environment.

In The Pillars of the Earth, primary in-game characters, based on those in the novel, include: Aliena, Cantor (voice acted by Ken Follett), Cuthbert, Earl Bartholomew, Jack, Martha, Philip, Richard, "Shovelmonk", Tom, Waleran, and William. There are only a few playable protagonists, namely Tom, and younger and older versions of Philip, Jack, and Aliena. Game characters visit or revisit in-game locations in the fictional earldom of Shiring, such as Kingsbridge, Shiring (town), Earlscastle, and St.-John-in-the-Forest, alongside historical locations such as Gloucester, Lincoln, Salisbury, and Winchester.

== Plot ==
The game begins with the option of an interactive tutorial inside a cathedral. It then transitions to the Prologue which is set in Shiring in 1135. It is here in the snow-covered woods, near St-James-in-the-Forest, that Tom, his heavily pregnant wife Agnes, and their children, Alfred and Martha, stop to rest overnight. It ends with the death of Agnes in childbirth.

=== Book 1: From the Ashes ===
The game restarts near Kingsbridge Priory as it mourns the death of Prior James. Philip, surprised by the news, learns of the upcoming vote for the new prior. He accepts a nomination, and also agrees to help his brother, Francis, recover a missing letter. We then see the aftermath of the death of Agnes, the abandonment and rescue of the newborn child, and the uniting of Tom's family with Ellen's. We then follow Jack from Ellen's cave to Shiring and ultimately Earlscastle, where he helps Tom to find work. The main characters of Aliena and William Hamleigh are also introduced, and Philip delivers the letter to Bishop Waleran. In January 1136, he gains the priorship over Sub-prior Remegius with the support of Waleran. Also, at Waleran's instigation, the Hamleighs launch a surprise attack on Earlscastle. Philip and the monks then deal with the arrival of some 200 refugees from Earlscastle. Among them are Tom and his family group. Jack is again tasked with helping Tom to find work, and successfully destroys the old cathedral. Philip goes to Winchester to meet with Waleran, the Hamleighs, and Bishop Henry, all seeking the spoils of Shiring from King Stephen. With the Hamleighs, he uncovers evidence of Waleran's duplicity at the bishop's palace, and negotiates a separate agreement for building resources. The book ends with Philip and Tom discussing plans of the new cathedral, culminating in Tom's appointment as master builder. Jack then wanders around the building site where he meets and re-friends Aliena.

=== Book 2: Sowing the Wind ===
The game restarts with William and his manservant Walter holding Aliena and Richard prisoner at Earlscastle. William chafes while waiting for news from his father, and derides Aliena at every opportunity. Stealing William's horse, they arrive in Winchester seeking their father. There they befriend the wife of a wool-merchant and swear oaths to their dying father. They then unsuccessfully seek their mother's sister. Aliena decides to buy some wool directly from a shepherd for resale, and is invited to Kingsbridge by Philip. The story then jumps to 1141 with Jack and Aliena now a couple, albeit secretly. Building the cathedral continues despite concerns about costs and troubles with the Hamleighs over resources. Evidence of the Hamleighs' harsh rule becomes evident as well. Aliena heads off to the Shiring marketplace, and with the proceeds she visits Richard to resupply him with funds. Philip, accompanied by Aliena, meets the new earl, William, who demands an end to the priory's market, as Waleran continues to scheme and plot. Philip accompanies Richard to Lincoln, in hopes of an appeal to the king. Stephen initially denies his request, but after losing the Battle of Lincoln, both are captured. After William switches sides, Stephen decides to approve a fleece fair and market at Kingsbridge. In revenge, William raids the market and Aliena loses her livelihood again. Jack becomes a novice and Aliena informs him that she will marry Alfred. Jack then leaves to search for traces of his father in France. Aliena finds herself pregnant with Jack's child and leaves to search for him, and Alfred goes to Shiring to work on a rival cathedral.

=== Book 3: Eye of the Storm ===
The game picks up with a flashback scene of the White Ship disaster, then jumps to July 1142 as Aliena arrives in Normandy. In Tours, she finds evidence of Jack, then takes the Camino de Santiago. Meanwhile, Jack has befriended a Muslim merchant in Toledo, and Aliena traces him to Saint Denis, where they marry. The family return to Cherbourg, where he is recognised by his father's mother. Next, Philip reluctantly welcomes Jack's moneymaking statue as a means to fund the rebuilding program. Philip, Jack, Aliena, and Richard then travel to Shiring to warn Waleran and William against interfering in the renovations at Kingsbridge. The story moves forward 11 years to 1154 when England suffers from a prolonged drought and famine. After a crack appears, Jack finds Prior James' hidden chamber under the cathedral and the chalice his father was accused of stealing, but reveals his complicity in the cathedral fire. Meanwhile, after nearly 15 years, the civil war ends and Aliena befriends Elizabeth Hamleigh during a storm. Philip's book, written in the interim, causes controversy as outlaws, led by 'The Butcher', begin to organise in the quarry. Aliena infiltrates Earlscastle in hopes of ousting William, and stabs him as Richard and the outlaws attack. Walter then assists the transition of power. Waleran, meanwhile, arrests Philip, and at the trial before Bishop Henry in the cathedral, all the various plot lines of the game are drawn together through Prior Remegius. Waleran is arrested and Philip undergoes trial by fire. In the Epilogue, 20 years later, Philip and Waleran meet one last time.

== Development ==
The concept for The Pillars of the Earth began in May 2014, when publishing company Bastei Lübbe acquired a majority interest in video game developer and publisher Daedalic Entertainment to expand its portfolio. At the Frankfurt Book Fair 2014, Daedalic CEO Carsten Fichtelmann suggested to Ken Follett a conversion of his novel.

The gameplay resembles similar point and click adventures released by Daedalic, such as The Whispered World, A New Beginning, and Deponia. The game is set in three parts. Book 1 was released in mid-August 2017 on Steam, and Book 2 in mid-December. A GOG release of Book 2 was also in December, and PS4 and Xbox One editions were available in January 2018. Book 3: Eye on the Storm was released at the end of March 2018. The iOS version of the game was initially released on April 4, 2018, and a version for Amazon Luna was made available on October 20, 2020.

The game is made using the Visionaire Studio engine, and features a 2D scrolling viewport with parallax layers. The game includes over 200 hand-painted backgrounds over which animated sprites interact. The soundtrack was produced by Tilo Alpermann. The score was recorded in Prague by FILMharmonic Orchestra, while medieval choral elements were recorded in Berlin-Pankow's Hoffnungskirche. It is available in eleven languages: Chinese (simplified and traditional), Danish, English, French, German, Italian, Norwegian, Polish, Russian, and Spanish. Voice actors recorded nearly 40 hours of voice-overs, including Ken Follett who also added his voice to the game.

== Reception ==
Reception

Aggregate scores
Aggregator	Score
Metacritic	PC: 78/100 (Book 1); PC: 72/100 (Book 3); PS4: 75/100 (Book 1); XONE: 78/100 (Book 1) iOS: 85/100; NS: 79/100
OpenCritic	78/100; 94% Critics Recommend; 79/100 (Book 1); 69% Critics Recommend; 77/100 (Book 2); 70% Critics Recommend; 73/100 (Book 3); 50% Critics Recommend

Review scores
Publication	Score
GameSpot	XONE: 7/10 (Book 1)
PC Games	PC: 82% (Book 3)
GameStar	PC: 74/100

The Pillars of the Earth has received "generally favorable" reviews, according to review aggregator Metacritic. Blake Hester from GameSpot praised the game's characters, unique visuals, and story development, but critiqued it for a lack of drama or tangible tension, a "snail-paced" narrative, and slow frame-rates and loading times on Xbox One.
