= Deponia =

Deponia may refer to:

- Deponia (video game), a 2012 point-and-click adventure game
  - Chaos on Deponia, second installment in the series
  - Goodbye Deponia, third installment in the series
  - Deponia Doomsday, fourth installment in the series
- Deponija (disambiguation)
