= Silence (video game) =

2016 German point-and-click adventure video game

Silence: The Whispered World 2
- Developer: Daedalic Entertainment
- Publisher: Daedalic Entertainment
- Director: Ulrich Wanitschke
- Producer: Steffen Roche
- Designer: Ulrich Wanitschke
- Programmer: Paul Schulze
- Artist: Marco Hüllen
- Writers: Marco Hüllen; Anne von Vaszary
- Composers: Tilo Alpermann; Baar Music
- Engine: Unity
- Platforms: Linux, macOS, Windows, PlayStation 4, Xbox One, Nintendo Switch
- Release: Linux, macOS, Windows, PlayStation 4; November 15, 2016; Xbox One; December 9, 2016; Nintendo Switch; April 3, 2019
- Genre: Point-and-click adventure
- Mode: Single-player

Silence, also known as Silence: The Whispered World II, is a 2016 German point-and-click adventure video game developed and published by Daedalic Entertainment and the sequel to the 2009 game The Whispered World. It was released in November 2016 for Linux, macOS, Windows, and PlayStation 4. Ports for Xbox One and Nintendo Switch were released in December 2016 and April 2019, respectively.

== Gameplay ==
Silence is controlled via a point-and-click interface.

== Plot ==
It follows a young girl, Renie, who is lost in a magical realm between life and death. Her older brother Noah then sets out to rescue her.

== Development ==
Silence was developed by Daedalic Entertainment, creator of the original Whispered World.

== Reception ==
Reception

Aggregate scores
| Aggregator | Score |
|---|---|
| Metacritic | PC: 75/100; PS4: 72/100; XONE: 66/100; NS: 76/100 |
| OpenCritic | 73/100; 66% Critics Recommend |

Review scores
| Publication | Score |
|---|---|
| 4Players | 82% |
| GameStar | 85/100 |
| PC Games (DE) | 8/10 |

It received 75/100 as a score on Metacritic, out of 29 critics.

GameSpot gave it a 7 out of 10, noting that it was a "quiet puzzler," and praised the hand-painted backdrops and interactivity. The review did criticize that there were not many challenging puzzles, and that some neat characters were removed from the game too quickly. Kotaku also thought it was pretty and had nice characters. It also thought the puzzles were more streamlined and intuitive than the one before.
