= Edna & Harvey: Harvey's New Eyes =

2011 video game

- Developer: Daedalic Entertainment
- Publishers: GER: rondomedia (PC); WW: Daedalic Entertainment
- Platforms: Windows; OS X; Linux; Nintendo Switch; iOS; PlayStation 4; Xbox One
- Release: August 26, 2011: Windows; GER: August 26, 2011; WW: October 16, 2012; OS X; WW: October 16, 2012 Linux; WW: May 31, 2016 iOS; WW: August 15, 2018 Switch, PS4, Xbox One; WW: August 14, 2019
- Genre: Graphic adventure
- Mode: Single-player

Edna & Harvey: Harvey's New Eyes (German: Harveys neue Augen) is a point-and-click adventure game created by Daedalic Entertainment. It was released in Germany on August 26, 2011, and is the sequel to Edna & Harvey: The Breakout.

== Gameplay ==
The game is set in a 2D cartoon world. The player controls Lilli. Unlike most other adventure games, there are no clickable dialogues. After the player clicks on a character, a bar appears with some symbols indicating a subject. The game neither has a list with actions such as Walk, Look, Talk, Pick up, Use. If applicable, items are automatically added to the inventory when the user clicks on them. Furthermore, the user must combine objects in their inventory in order to create new ones (or to modify existing items). Objects in the inventory can be given to other characters or can be combined with items not in the inventory.

== Plot ==
The game starts in a strict boarding school led by a female convent order. The head of the convent order is abbess Ignatz. One of the pupils is Lilli, the main character. She is a shy, insecure little girl not daring to speak in public. She does not have her own opinions (or is afraid to say them) and she executes all charged tasks. Another pupil is Edna, from the same company's previous game Edna & Harvey: The Breakout, although she is much less aggressive here than in The Breakout.

The abbess can't stand the kid's behavior anymore and wants to bring in doctor Marcel, who will brainwash the children to be all good and modest. When Edna hears this news, she wants to escape: she pushed doctor Marcel down the stairs at the end of The Breakout and left him for dead, although she can't remember the reason. She is now afraid doctor Marcel wants revenge if he finds her, and gives Lilli the task to remove all evidence of Edna's presence.

Lilli discovers that Gerret, one of the elder students, is an undercover agent. He wants to expose the malpractice of Ignatz. He also warns Lilli she might get caught by Marcel. Marcel captures Lilli and uses the ragdoll Harvey to hypnotize Lilli. The hypnosis prevents Lilli taking the following actions: playing with fire, to disobey adults, to lie, to drink alcohol, to use sharp objects, to enter dangerous places and to get angry. Each time Lilli makes a violation, the hypnosis gives her an electric shock. At such time, a demon-version of Harvey turns up and tells Lilli what she has done wrong.

Gerret gives Lilli a truth serum, which has to be drunk by Ignatz. By doing this, Gerret discovers that the misbehavior is caused by a child-hood trauma. Gerret also tells Lilli she can beat the hypnosis by fighting the prohibition-demons. This action causes her to go into trance. In these trance-worlds she is able to find solutions to get rid of the prohibitions one by one.

But removing the mental blocks also caused her repressed memories to resurface. This culminated when the mental wall she destroyed led to the Valley of Unpleasant Memories and forced Lilli to discover the horrifying and cruel truth: Her actions she made that enabled her to advance her goals earlier in the beginning came at the cost of murdering her fellow classmates in the most gruesome and cold-blooded deaths.

In the meantime, Edna escaped the boarding school and was kidnapped by some men who work for Marcel. They take her to the asylum. Lilli and Gerret try to find her, Gerret seeks for help while Lilli penetrates into the asylum. Lilli eventually finds Edna in her former cell, where both Gerret and the brainwashed Ignatz are also being held captive. Lilli is able to get Ignatz out of her trance. Ignatz regrets her actions and gives Lilli a knife to rescue Edna and Gerret. Marcel tries to convince Lilli she is very ill and needs therapy. Edna remembers what happened in The Breakout. As Lilli has overcome all her restrictions, she can do whatever she wants. This causes the game to have three different endings: she stabs Marcel, she confirms she is ill and goes into therapy, or she objects and leaves, finally fed up with people telling her what to do without asking her what she wants.

== Reception ==
Reception

Review scores
Publication	Score
4Players	90/100
Gameswelt	89%
GameStar	86/100
PC Games	85%

According to Carsten Fichtelmann of Daedalic Entertainment, Harvey's New Eyes sold 80,000 physical copies at German retailers.

The game was awarded a score of 75/100 on Metacritic. Adventure Gamers gave the game a 3.5 out of 5, remarking that it was a good game with a palatable interface, but compared it unfavorably to its predecessor. IGN gave the game a rating of 6/10, asserting that most of the characters were underdeveloped and that the environments were banal and uninteresting.
