= ZanZarah: The Hidden Portal =

2002 video game

- Developer: Funatics Development
- Publishers: EU: THQ; NA: Xicat Interactive
- Designer: Andreas Nitsche
- Composers: Kariina Gretere; Lars Hammer; Matthias Steinwachs
- Engine: RenderWare
- Platform: Microsoft Windows
- Release: GER: April 26, 2002; UK: June 28, 2002; NA: December 10, 2002
- Genres: Action-adventure, role-playing
- Modes: Single-player, multiplayer

ZanZarah: The Hidden Portal (German: Zanzarah: Das Verborgene Portal) is an action-adventure video game by the German company Funatics Development, released in 2002 by the publisher THQ. An expansion was in development in 2002, but was later cancelled. The game involves travels and combats in a magical world loosely associated with our own world. Versions for Xbox, PlayStation 2 and GameCube were announced in 2003 but later cancelled.

== Plot ==
=== Setting ===
ZanZarah: The Hidden Portal features a detailed fantasy world called ZanZarah. The Shadow Realm is a place of great evil in the depths of ZanZarah, even deeper than the lava caves of the dwarves. There are a few entrances into it: one is in the pixie-hunter Lucius' cellar where he keeps captured pixies. Another is in the catacombs beneath Tiralin. But the main entrance leading to the shadow realm is hidden deep in the southeastern swamps of ZanZarah.

=== Story ===
Long ago, our world and ZanZarah were one. Magical creatures like fairies, elves, dwarves, and goblins lived in peace with humans for a long time; and magic was an important part of our world. But then came the dark times, the times of inquisition and a great magic purge. The magical creatures had to flee from our world to save themselves, and the human Druids, the last wielders of white magic, helped them by creating a world suitable for their existence and closing the way there for the human race.

For centuries, the two worlds were separated and prospering. The creatures of ZanZarah sometimes visited their former home but generally preferred to stay in the new one. For humans, the way to ZanZarah was forever sealed by a mysterious machine called the Guardian. However, as time passed, the magic world became more and more a prison rather than a paradise for the magic folk. It became harder to cross the border between the worlds, even for the inhabitants of ZanZarah. Wild fairies started attacking the travelers for no apparent reason. Strange creatures calling themselves dark elves appeared on the roads. And the White Druid, the last of the mighty creators of ZanZarah, seemed helpless against them.

Not only ZanZarah is affected by this strange plague. The ancient, and by that time half-forgotten, world of humans also suffered from a loss of something very important—magic. A prophecy as old as ZanZarah itself tells that when the time comes, a savior will come from the world of humans to restore the balance between the two universes and peace will once again reign between the magic folk and humans. Until then, however, fairies, elves, dwarves, and goblins have to wait and hope.

The game follows the story of Amy, a young girl from London who on her eighteenth birthday receives the strangest present in her life—a magic rune—from an even stranger creature, a goblin who appears out of nowhere and disappears without saying anything. The rune is one of the teleportation runes that the inhabitants of the magic parallel world ZanZarah employ to travel across their lands.

Upon her arrival in ZanZarah, Amy discovers that she is the one the ancient prophecy tells of and that it is her destiny to become the greatest fairy trainer of all time, and to save both her world and ZanZarah from impending destruction. Of course, to accomplish that she must undertake a long journey; but being an inquisitive and optimistic person, Amy readily accepts her destiny. After all, this world of ZanZarah looks so much more beautiful and safe than hers.

== Gameplay ==
The overall gameplay in ZanZarah: The Hidden Portal is a simple example of the action-adventure genre. Following the tradition of the Pokémon series, the game is divided into exploration and battle phases. In the exploration phase, the player navigates Amy through the world of ZanZarah. Freedom of movement is limited by many obstacles, such as prickly bushes, huge boulders, enemies, doors, or elevators that one has to find keys for, etc. In the classic action-adventure style, Amy explores the environment, solves various puzzles, gathers items, and interacts with NPCs. Another aspect of the non-battle phase is RPG-like healing, restoring magic powers, assigning spells to the fairies, and rearranging the fairy deck Amy has with her on her travels.

Traveling via the global map is impossible, but Amy can use magical teleportation runes to shift to virtually any key location—provided, of course, that she has already found the corresponding rune. One rune can even teleport her back to London where all fairies she has captured, but not added to her deck, stay. It is nearly impossible for Amy to die in ZanZarah (apart from falling from a cliff, drowning in a swamp, or jumping into a river of lava), and even if she dies, she resumes her journey at the entrance to the location with all the inventory and fairy statistics she had prior to her death.

The battle phase begins when Amy is attacked by a wild fairy or challenged to a fairy duel, and ends when all enemies or her own fairies are defeated. In the latter case, Amy dies and respawns at the entrance to the location in the condition she was in prior to the battle. While in the battle phase, the player navigates one fairy out of Amy's deck through a dueling arena (of which there are dozens of layouts) in a first-person shooter style. Each fairy has two offense-defense pairs of spells that it can switch to at any time. To actually shoot at an enemy with an offensive spell, the player must hold down the left mouse button to accumulate some charge rather than just tap it. It is important to have some knowledge of arena layouts and good timing to pull off the most deadly attacks.

== Release ==
ZanZarah was originally published in Europe for Microsoft Windows on April 26, 2002 by THQ, and was released by Xicat Interactive in the U.S. on December 18, 2002. After THQ folded, the rights to the IP have been acquired by Daedalic Entertainment, who re-released it on Steam on August 20, 2015.

=== Soundtrack ===
Several critics praised the game's music. Most of the themes were created by a German composer, King Einstein (also known for his work on the Cultures RTS series). The title theme Come With Me was composed and performed by British-Latvian singer Kariina Gretere, whom some compare to Enya. The entire soundtrack can be freely downloaded from the official website.

== Reception ==
Reception

Aggregate score
Aggregator	Score
Metacritic	77/100

Review scores
Publication	Score
4Players	83%
GameSpot	7.6/10
GameStar	75%
Jeuxvideo.com	14/20
Joystick	66%
PC Games (DE)	74%
PC Zone	79%
RPGamer	7/10
X-Play	4/5

The game received "generally favorable reviews" according to the review aggregation website Metacritic.

== Expansion ==
An unnamed expansion (some fans refer to it as ZanZarah: The Lost Village) to the game was in development in the second half of 2002. Apparently, it would have featured an entirely new village named Gramire and some new characters, including an unlucky King Ironir. However, the project was cancelled for marketing reasons and only a few materials remained in its wake:

- A selection of screenshots has been available on the official site, but all of them were later removed
- A short teaser trailer has been released on the official site
- The music theme of Gramire can be downloaded from King Einstein's website
