= State of Mind (video game) =

2018 graphic adventure game

- Developer: Daedalic Entertainment
- Publisher: Daedalic Entertainment
- Director: Martin Ganteföhr
- Producer: Carsten Fichtelmann
- Designer: Martin Wilkes
- Programmer: Max Stegan
- Artist: Stefan Wacker
- Writers: Martin Ganteföhr; Tilman Schanen
- Engine: Unreal Engine 4
- Platforms: Linux; macOS; Windows; Nintendo Switch; PlayStation 4; Xbox One
- Release: August 15, 2018
- Genre: Adventure
- Mode: Single player

State of Mind is a 2018 graphic adventure game developed and published by Daedalic Entertainment. A cyberpunk story set in the near future, the game explores transhumanist themes. The game was released for Windows, macOS, Linux, PlayStation 4, Nintendo Switch and Xbox One in August 2018. It received mixed reviews upon release.

== Gameplay ==
The game is played through a third-person perspective. There is no combat involved in the game, instead gameplay mostly revolves around interacting with other characters, solving puzzles and doing mini games. Many things in the world can be scanned and interacted with, which gives the player information about items in the world. Players can, for example, interact with photos of the main character Richard's family. The game also focuses on exploring a wide variety of locations.

== Plot ==
State of Mind unfolds in Berlin in 2048 and revolves around Richard Nolan, a journalist waking up in a hospital after an explosion, finding out that his family is nowhere to be found. Nolan soon realizes that the world has changed and that technology is taking over. The game focuses on the impact that AI and technology have on humans, as well as coming to terms with in what manner super AI- can adapt to human behavior. The main character in the game, Richard Nolan, is voiced by Doug Cockle, most notable for being the English-language voice actor of Geralt of Rivia in the The Witcher video game series.

== Development ==
Development of State of Mind was led by Martin Ganteföhr, creator of the 2004 adventure game The Moment of Silence. Production began in 2015. The game was developed with Unreal Engine 4. State of Mind features a low-poly art style inspired in part by the visuals of That Dragon, Cancer. According to Daedalic's Kai Fiebig, the art style was Ganteföhr's idea, as the fragmented look reflected the game's themes in its portrayal of "a shattered person, a shattered society on the edge of change." The game was released on Nintendo Switch on August 15, 2018, in the west and on November 8, 2018, in Japan.

== Reception ==
Reception

Aggregate score
Aggregator	Score
Metacritic	(PC) 69/100 (PS4) 67/100 (XONE) 73/100 (NS) 63/100

Review scores
Publication	Score
Adventure Gamers	2.5/5
Jeuxvideo.com	15/20
Nintendo Life	6/10
VideoGamer.com	7/10
GameStar	69/100
PC Games	82%
4Players	69%

State of Mind received mixed reviews from video game critics on Metacritic.

Writing for Adventure Gamers, Pascal Takaia praised the transhumanist themes and voice acting, while criticizing the game's narrative, puzzles and characters. Conversely, Jeuxvideo.com gave the game a positive review, particularly praising the game's visuals, story and themes. Roy Woodhouse of Gamereactor praised the game for its gripping sci-fi world, and he said the game is "thought-provoking and provides emotional and engaging narrative", though he called the puzzles "a little weak". Writing for GameStar, Robin Rüther praised the graphics but criticised the lack of challenge and the mini games. Paula Sprödefeld of PC Games liked the story and graphics but had complaints regarding the controls.

Conversely, Dom Reseigh-Lincoln of Nintendo Life, said "State of Mind has its moments to shine", including the endgame plot and visuals, but he criticized what he felt were overdone science fiction cliches, poor voice acting, and a "lack of cohesion between its gameplay ideas", which said resulted in "a muddled experience at best". Writing for VideoGamer, Josh Wish praised the story and the art style, while mentioning the puzzles and some story related cliches as negative aspects. Jan Wöbbeking of 4Players commended the story but criticized the mini games and the portrayal of characters.
