= Edna & Harvey: The Breakout =

2008 German adventure video game

- Developer: Daedalic Entertainment
- Publishers: Lace Mamba Global (Windows); Application Systems Heidelberg (Mac OS X); Daedalic Entertainment (Anniversary Edition)
- Platforms: Windows; macOS; iOS; Anniversary Edition; Windows; Linux; macOS; Nintendo Switch; PlayStation 4; Xbox One; Amazon Luna
- Release: Windows: GER: 5 June 2008; NA: 8 February 2011; UK: 11 February 2011; Mac OS X: GER: 2 April 2009; iOS: WW: 10 August 2012; Anniversary Edition; Windows: WW: 4 December 2019; Linux, macOS: WW: 31 January 2020; Switch, PS4, Xbox One: WW: 17 June 2020; Amazon Luna: US: 20 October 2020
- Genre: Point-and-click adventure
- Mode: Single-player

Edna & Harvey: The Breakout (German: Edna bricht aus, lit. 'Edna breaks out') is a 2008 German adventure video game developed by Daedalic Entertainment. Starring a young woman and her toy rabbit, the objective of the game is to escape from a mental hospital in which they find themselves in at the beginning of the game.

The game was originally released for Microsoft Windows, macOS and iOS. An anniversary edition was released in 2019 and 2020 for Microsoft Windows, macOS, SteamOS + Linux, Nintendo Switch, PlayStation 4, Xbox One and Amazon Luna. A sequel, Edna & Harvey: Harvey's New Eyes, was released in 2011.

== Gameplay ==
Edna & Harvey: The Breakout is an adventure game in the same vein as LucasArts' pre-1994 games created using the SCUMM engine. The game screen shows a two-dimensional cartoon world where Edna, the playable character, is incarcerated within a mental hospital. The player is able to talk to objects and people, use items, and interact with things in the environment. The bottom edge of the screen contains a list of actions the player can perform, which must be clicked on before the player clicks on an item within the environment in order to manipulate it. During gameplay, expensive in-game objects such as cars can be defaced by the player; this does not affect the game in any tangible way but instead serves to represent an act of rebellion.

== Plot ==
Edna awakes in a padded cell with her toy rabbit, Harvey, who she talks to throughout the game. She has no recollection of how she came to be in the cell and must escape. In order to do so, she navigates along the ventilation shafts and gathers friends (other inmates) as well. Such friends include two people in one sweater, one trying to become an energy being, and another who can make keys to any lock. While there, she decides to clear her father's name, although he was killed for murdering asylum owner Dr. Marcel's son. Harvey then gives Edna the ability to relive certain events in her past, called 'Tempomorphing'. After escaping in Dr. Marcel's car, they crash in a swamp and go separate ways, the 'Keymaster' following Edna. He wanted revenge on Edna for releasing 'someone who should never be released', meaning himself. After escaping a Church that he locked both Edna and himself in, she finds herself at her own house where she learns that she was the one who committed the murder of Dr. Marcel's son by pushing him down the stairs and that her father took the blame. Dr. Marcel then arrives and asks her to come back with him so he can have her memory erased, as her father asked him to do. Though he succeeded several times, Harvey always brought her memories back. Edna is then given two options: Destroy Harvey and have her memory erased permanently, or listen to Harvey and push him down the stairs like she pushed his son. If she listens to Dr. Marcel, she cuts Harvey to pieces with scissors, is renamed, and given house chores to do for the rest of her life, which she then adores doing. If she listens to Harvey, however, she knocks Dr. Marcel down the staircase with a mallet from his office and is never heard from again, the only clue of her fate being the remains of Harvey found by the ocean.

== Development ==
The game was originally developed as a university project by Jan Müller-Michaelis (known as Poki), co-founder of Daedalic Entertainment. Jan Müller-Michaelis created his own game engine using Java to implement the game.

According to Daedalic's Carsten Fichtelmann, Valve rejected Edna & Harvey and A New Beginning three times from its Steam platform "on the grounds that their target audience did not care about the game". However, Daedalic went on to achieve success on the platform.

== Reception ==
Reception

Review scores
Publication	Score
4Players	88/100
GameStar	76/100
PC Games (DE)	82%

Edna & Harvey: The Breakout garnered a Metacritic score of 56, representing "mixed or average reviews".
