= Anna's Quest =

2015 video game

- Developer: Krams Design
- Publisher: Daedalic Entertainment
- Platforms: Microsoft Windows; Nintendo Switch; PlayStation 4; Xbox One
- Release: Microsoft Windows; July 2, 2015; Nintendo Switch, PlayStation 4, Xbox One; July 30, 2021
- Genre: Adventure
- Mode: Single player

Anna's Quest is a 2015 graphic adventure game developed by Krams Design and published by Daedalic Entertainment. The game follows the title character Anna as she attempts to escape an evil witch and save her dying grandfather. Taking on the role of Anna, the player solves puzzles, collects items, and interacts with non-player characters.

== Plot ==
The story is about a young girl called Anna. She lives in a dark forest with her grandfather whom she likes to call "grandpa". However, one night, while she seeks help for her ill and bedridden grandpa, Anna is suddenly kidnapped by a mysterious woman. The woman traps her in a room at the top of a tower, in which she is experimented on and develops psychokinesis. Soon after, she meets Ben, an amnesiac boy who was turned into a teddy bear by the woman, who Ben refers to as a witch. Together they find a way to escape the tower and trap the witch inside it. The two arrive at the city of Wiederhorn, where there is a wizard (later revealed to be a sorceress) that may be able to help cure Anna's grandfather. In the city, they encounter numerous obstacles, including another witch who eats children, a ghost who roams a river, and being chased by royal guards. The duo manage to gather the ingredients the sorceress needs to make a cure, but it turns out the sorceress is really the witch in disguise and the king's new fiancée.

Consequently, she has the royal guards arrest the kids, and Anna is put in a dungeon in hell under the supervision of the Devil and separated from Ben. Anna finds out that the witch is responsible for her grandfather's illness, and the only way to save him is to stop the witch. Anna escapes hell using her powers and wits and finds that the king's castle is in the process of preparing for the king's wedding to the witch. Anna also finds out that Ben is in the castle, kept in a jail cell by the witch as she interrogates him for information about his mother. Anna later discovers that Ben's mother is Jannike, who was trapped inside the ice at the top of a glass mountain. After being freed, Jannike insists on remaining imprisoned as it allows the protection spell she put on her son Ben to remain unbroken. By the time Anna frees Ben before the witch's wedding, the reasons behind her actions are fully revealed: Jannike is the queen and Ben is the prince, however the witch kidnapped them and made the king forget about them to allow her to seduce him to ask for her hand in marriage. It is also revealed that the witch made Anna's grandfather ill so she could use her experiment on Anna, as her grandfather also has telekinesis, to obtain the power of telekinesis as her own. Anna and Ben interrupt the witch's wedding, as Jannike suddenly appears, her words angering the witch into creating a blast of destructive energy. Anna uses her powers to prevent everyone from getting hurt, and then enter the witch's mind, going into the memories of her past.

There, it is revealed that as a child, the witch, who is actually Winfried, Jannike's younger sister, had wanted to prove how science is a means by which to learn of the truth in their world, just like magic. She was helped by Hans, her stuttering friend who agreed with her. However, no one else agreed with her, including her mother, a teacher at magic school. In an attempt to prove science, Hans and Winfried use a ritual to summon Minerva's wisdom, only to be rejected by the goddess. Enraged, Winfriede decides to go down to the river where the Weisse Frauen live to retrieve a magical object called the Amber Orb, but Hans arrives before her, and the river spirits drown him. Accused for sending Hans to his death, she's cruelly punished as Winfriede is put on trial by the Wanderer, a messenger for the Norns to tell the Wyrd of everyone, and is condemned to look like the monster everyone now believed her to be. This includes her own family, and her mother abandons her as she swears revenge against them all, even Jannike.

Back in the present, Winfriede recalls the past as she tries to kill Anna only to be pushed away by her in a gesture of self-defense, making her fall to her death. Ben recovers his human form. Days later, peace and order return to the kingdom, and Anna returns to her grandfather who is now cured after Winfriede's death.

== Gameplay ==
A screenshot of the game being played.

Anna's Quest is controlled with a point-and-click interface.

The Main Menu has multiple buttons, which are as follows:

- Resume game (represented by an icon of Anna)
- New game (represented by an icon of Ben as a teddy bear)
- Save games (represented by a coffee icon)
- Settings (represented by an icon of Wunderhorn)
- Bonus (represented by an icon of Anna's grandfather)
- Exit game (represented by a door icon)

Settings has selections for:

Tools icon: subtitles, hotspot indicator, achievement notice, minigame skip button and open inventory by clicking.

Monitor icon: fullscreen, window size, additional animations, brightness and HD cutscenes.

Sounds icon: voices volume, music volume, effects volume, cinematic volume, global volume and mute.

Controls icon: reprogramming of mouse and keyboard keys are available.

Language (text and dialogue): English, Spanish, French, Italian, Russian and German.

Bonus has pictures, movies, achievements and credits.

Main menu is accessed by the ESC key during gameplay.

Inventory is seen by use of I key or mouse scroll button. Inventory items can be combined.

The inventory book has suitcase tab for inventory, disk for quick save, gear for settings and house for main menu.

Active spots are shown by pressing the space bar or the mouse wheel.

Left click does the action. Right click gives a description.

Left click on dialogues skips it.

To save a game, select a frame and click the save button. There is an auto save and quick save. The saved games can be deleted or overwritten.

Load game is also in the same page as save game.

Double click leaves the scene.

== Development ==
Anna's Quest was developed by Daedalic Entertainment, previously responsible for games such as Deponia.

== Reception ==
Reception

Aggregate scores
Aggregator	Score
Metacritic	PC: 74/100
OpenCritic	33% recommend

Review scores
Publication	Score
4Players	66%
Adventure Gamers	4.5/5
PC Games (DE)	72%

The PC version of Anna's Quest received "mixed or average" reviews from critics, according to the review aggregation website Metacritic. Fellow review aggregator OpenCritic assessed that the game was recommended by 33% of critics.
