= A New Beginning (video game) =

2010 German video game

- Developer: Daedalic Entertainment
- Publisher: Lace International (under Lace Mamba Global label)
- Composer: Knights of Soundtrack
- Platforms: Microsoft Windows, OS X, iOS
- Release: GER: 8 October 2010; EU: 3 June 2011; WW: 11 December 2012 (Final Cut); WW: 8 December 2015 (iOS)
- Genre: Point-and-click adventure
- Mode: Single-player

A New Beginning is a point-and-click adventure video game developed by Daedalic Entertainment and published by Lace Mamba Global for Microsoft Windows, OS X and iOS. The game's story, focused on theme of climate change, sees players assume the role of two different characters - a scientist from the 1990s who developed a clean fuel source method; and a time traveller from the distant future where climate changes has brought the world close to extinction - who must work together to change the course of history for the sake of humanity's survival in the future. The game received mixed reviews following its release.

== Gameplay ==
The game is divided into 11 asynchronous chapters, with cutscenes played out in the style of a comic book. Players assume the role of one of two protagonists - scientist Bent Svennson, and time-traveller Fay - during each chapter, but cannot switch between them. Each chapter consists of a series of locations with puzzles that require players to find objects in order to solve them. Players can move the character around a location depending on the game's platform - on PC, this is done with the mouse, in which left-clicking moves the character while holding it down on an object allows players to choose an action to perform (such as looking at it, or picking it up), while right-clicking opens the inventory and allows them to interact with items they possess, as well as combine them with other items or use them on objects.

== Plot ==
Bent Svensson, a former scientist who now lives in the fjords of Norway is surprised when, while fixing some equipment near his home, he is approached by a mysterious woman who identifies herself as Fay. Bent is confused when she reacts harshly to using his equipment to preserve nearby trees for firewood, despite its negative effect on the local wildlife, leading Fay to reveal that she is a time-traveller, who has come back into the past to save humanity's future. Sceptical of her words, Bent nonetheless agrees to listen to her story.

Fay reveals that she has come from the distant future of 2500, where humanity is forced to live underground in bunkers following a global ecological disaster, which devastated Earth and killed much of the population, plants and animals. Following a recent examination of the planet's atmosphere, scientists determine that the planet is set to be hit by a powerful solar flare that will wipe out all remaining life on Earth. To prevent this, teams of specialists were assigned the task of travelling into the past to locate the planet's political leaders and convince them to do whatever they could to prevent the disaster that weakened the planet's geo-magnetical fields.

However, the scientists miscalculated when in the past to conduct their mission, arriving in 2050 at the time the planet was being ravaged by ecological storms, including tornadoes in Europe, and flooding in North America. Fay, who arrived in San Francisco which has been left in ruins, discovered most of the other teams had died upon arrival; her own teammate later died after arriving, but not before passing her a data packet that can lead them to the correct time period. Rescuing another team that had arrived in the city, Fay worked to power up her time machine so it could lead her into the past.

Salvador concludes their team must travel back in time to a year where ecological problems already exist, but still can be solved. In their search they find an article about Bent Svensson who invented a biofuel based upon blue algae. They also find an article how earth got partially destroyed after a nuclear reactor exploded in the Brazilian Amazon rainforest. This event destroyed the rain forest causing to start a chain reaction in which the earth went into a nuclear winter. The team travels back in time. However, it turns out Bent had to go on retirement due to health issues. The project is now led by his son Duve. Fay must convince Bent she really is from the future, the biofuel is the only solution to save the planet and the product must go in production right away. However, everyone has some reason to manipulate things for own purposes. This might fail the rescue of earth—or not.

== Development ==
According to Daedalic's Carsten Fichtelmann, Valve rejected A New Beginning and Edna & Harvey: The Breakout three times from its Steam platform "on the grounds that their target audience did not care about the game". However, Daedalic went on to achieve success on the platform.

== Reception ==
=== Domestic ===
Reception

Review scores
Publication	Score
PC Games	84%
GameStar	84/100
4Players	82/100

=== International ===
Reception

Aggregate scores
Aggregator	Score
GameRankings	67.88%
Metacritic	72/100

Review scores
Publication	Score
Adventure Gamers	4/5
Destructoid	4/10
GameSpot	6.5/10

A New Beginning received mixed reviews. It received an aggregated score of 67.88% on GameRankings based on 8 reviews and 72/100 on Metacritic based on 20 reviews.

== Soundtrack ==
While A New Beginning's soundtrack was primarily composed by Knights of Soundtrack, the credits list a number of additional people, who contributed music to the game. The main theme was written by Periscope Studios, Bent's Theme by André Navratil and Damian Zur. Florian Behnsen and Giliam Spliethoff contributed additional music, while serving as the game's soundtrack and SFX supervisors. The musical styles displayed, range from orchestral underscore, to incidental pieces in a 1980s Europop style and lounge music.

In 2010, the soundtrack received the Deutscher Entwicklerpreis award for Best Soundtrack.
