= Deponia (video game) =

2012 video game

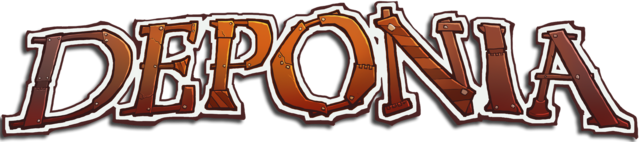
- Developer: Daedalic Entertainment
- Publisher: Daedalic Entertainment
- Platforms: Microsoft Windows, OS X, Linux, iOS, PlayStation 4, Nintendo Switch, Xbox One
- Release: Microsoft Windows: GER: 27 January 2012; EU: 29 June 2012; NA: 6 August 2012; OS X: WW: 6 August 2012; Linux: WW: 8 July 2014; iOS: WW: 10 September 2015; PlayStation 4: EU: 15 November 2016; NA: 1 December 2016; Nintendo Switch, Xbox One: WW: 24 April 2019
- Genre: Graphic adventure
- Mode: Single-player

Deponia is a graphic adventure video game developed and published by Daedalic Entertainment. The game's story sees players taking on the role of Rufus, an inhabitant of the junk planet Deponia, as he attempts to seek a new life on the floating city known as Elysium. However, he soon becomes embroiled with the task of helping an Elysian return to their home and uncovers a plot that threatens his home planet. The game received multiple sequels, including Chaos on Deponia (2012), Goodbye Deponia (2013), and Deponia Doomsday (2016).

== Gameplay ==
Like most forms of graphic adventure games, players take on the role of a character who must solve a variety of puzzles. Objects in the game can be manipulated, or picked up to be used to overcome obstacles or combined with other inventory items to make a new item to use. At times, the player encounters people in the game who can be talked with for clues and trivia. The game's main interface features a simple system connected to the mouse, in which the player left-clicks an object/person to use it/talk to, and right-click it to examine it, while a hint system, indicating interactive elements, can be activated by holding down the mouse's middle button.

The game's unique elements are special puzzles that the player can skip if they cannot solve them, a tutorial phase at the beginning, as well as a unique, humorous option available after completing the game, which when activated causes descriptions/names of objects and people, and all spoken dialog, to be changed to being only "Droggeljug".

== Plot ==
=== Setting ===
The game's story takes place on the planet of Deponia - a world which originally was inhabited by a large human population, until the majority ascended towards living in a utopia-styled floating city called Elysium. Over time, the Elysians forgot their origins and past with the planet, assuming it to be nothing more than an uninhabitable world. For the remaining humans left behind, their home planet became a dumping ground for those who ascended, leaving them to make settlements amongst the trash that is regularly dumped on the surface's landmasses, with communities managing to thrive as best they can, and clean water considered the most valuable commodity for them.

=== Story ===
Seeking to follow in his father's footsteps, Rufus, a young man living in the town of Kuvaq, constructs a makeshift rocket in his latest attempt to travel to Elysium. After a mishap causes the rocket to break up in mid-flight, Rufus manages to land on a cruiser run by the Organon - a militant organisation that terrorises the inhabitants of Deponia and regularly dumps trash on its surface with their craft. While aboard, he witnesses the Organon, led by Baliff Argus, pursue a young Elysium woman named Goal, who is shocked that they have been covering up the fact that Deponia is still inhabited by humans. Argus reveals to Goal he intends to keep her quiet and prevent her informing others of what she saw, forcing Rufus to try to rescue her. After managing to inadvertently knock both of them off the ship, Rufus discovers Goal was knocked unconscious when she landed in Kuvaq and that the town's residents seek to have the honour of looking after her.

Wishing to prevent this and complete his rescue, he begins working on a way to revive Goal, and does so through a specially-made coffee created from bizarre ingredients he collects around town. When she awakens, Goal is found to be unable to speak properly as a result of her brain implant - a cartridge based system which stores an Elsyian's memory, that was damaged in the fall - though Rufus learns that her fiancé, Cletus, will reward him handsomely for her return. Sabotaging the town's post office to use its radio, Rufus contacts Cletus, and upon convincing him to take him to Elysium in exchange for the return of Goal, agrees to bring her to the Lower Ascension Station beyond the town's borders. Shortly after he makes the arrangements, Argus arrives in Kuvaq to track down Goal, forcing Rufus to escape with her before they can abduct her.

After travelling for some time, Rufus reaches a garbage mine, and seeks out transportation that can bring him to his destination much quicker. After fixing up a garbage mine bike with the help of Doc, a travelling maintenance man, Rufus continues on his journey, and eventually reaches the Lower Ascension Station with Goal. Leaving her to rest, Rufus seeks a way up to the station's platform at the top. After reprogramming a lift to take him up there, he soon finds that the Organnon have arrived at the station, along with Cletus. Listening in on his conversation with Argus, Rufus overhears them plotting together to prepare for Deponia's destruction with the Organnon's leader, Prime Controller Ulysses, and that Goal is only needed for the codes needed to ascend back to Elysium stored, within her malfunctioning brain implant; once acquired, Cletus intends to wipe her memory, so she has no recollection of encountering life on the planet.

Seeking to prevent this, Rufus soon finds Goal missing, but follows a trail leading him to trawler vessel owned by Captain Bozo, in which he receives assistance once again from Doc. After fixing her implants, Goal awakens and is brought up to date by Rufus. Returning to the Station, the pair encounter Cletus, who tricks Goal into distrusting Rufus and forcing him to switch her memory cartridge for a back-up he had brought along. Ascending to Elysium but guilt-ridden by what he is doing, Rufus comes clean to Goal about the change of cartridges and returns to the planet to retrieve her memory cartridge at her request. Although Rufus retrieves it, he encounters Cletus and Argus, who force him to hand back the memory cartridge. While Cletus ascends back to Elysium with Goal, Argus prepares to deal with Rufus, who knows too much about their plans. However, Rufus refuses to hand back the back-up cartridge he still has, and manages to escape using Ulysses' flying communicator system. In the aftermath, Rufus decides to travel with Captain Bozo, but remains quiet on what he knows of Deponia's future.

== Reception ==
Reception

Aggregate score
Aggregator	Score
Metacritic	(NS) 64/100 (PC) 74/100 (PS4) 71/100

Review scores
Publication	Score
4Players	87/100
Adventure Gamers	3.5/5
Destructoid	7/10
GameSpot	8/10
GameStar	88/100
PC Games (DE)	84%
RPGFan	80%
Adventure Classic Gaming	4/5
The Escapist	4/5
GameWatcher	5/10

Deponia received "mixed or average" reviews, according to review aggregator Metacritic.

Some critics such as "Strategy Informer" (currently known as gamewatcher.com) slammed the game, saying "The plot moves glacially, and seems to be held up by puzzles that fail to complement it." Destructoid agreed with this point, saying "The game prolongs dialogue with bad joke after bad joke, at times".

However, the majority of critics and gamers liked the game overall, with key points of praise being "A brilliantly absurd story, a fitting comic style and strong speakers." (GamingXP), "Deponia is an incredibly funny, affectionately designed adventure." and "Deponia is one of the most entertaining point & click titles we've seen in the last couple of years."

Kotaku gave the game a positive review, saying "The first in a planned trilogy of games that I like to think of as the Rufus Saga, Deponia is sharp, pretty and quirky-as-hell".

Deponia and its sequel, Chaos on Deponia, totaled 200,000 global sales by April 2013. The first game alone had become Daedalic's highest-selling title, with sales of 500,000 units worldwide, by September of the following year. However, it was not the company's most profitable product by that time, as this distinction went to The Dark Eye: Blackguards. The Deponia series overall achieved sales of 2.2 million copies by 2016, most of which derived from deep-discount sales, according to Daedalic's Carsten Fichtelmann. He noted that "full price sales were a little part of that [2.2 million] number".
