= Deutscher Entwicklerpreis =

- Awarded for: Outstanding achievements in the video game industry in Germany
- Location: Essen, Düsseldorf, Cologne
- Country: Germany
- First award: 2004
- Website: deutscherentwicklerpreis.de

The Deutscher Entwicklerpreis (transl. German Developer Award) is a prize for video game development studios from German speaking countries, organized by Aruba Events GmbH.

== Description ==
The Deutscher Entwicklerpreis was first awarded on 12 November 2004 in Essen. Between 2005 and 2010 the awards ceremony was held in the historic Lichtburg cinema in Essen, and then between 2011 and 2013 it was held in Düsseldorf. Since 2014 it has been held in Cologne with an extended programme, including a Game Music Jam and a game developers conference supported by the government of North Rhine-Westphalia.

== Prize Winners 2016 ==
- Best PR: Safety First! (JCO, Headup Games)
- Best marketing campaign: Deponia Doomsday Tour (Daedalic Entertainment)
- Best Publisher: Tivola Publishing
- Best game design: Shadow Tactics: Blades of the Shogun (Mimimi Productions, Daedalic Entertainment)
- Best Sound: Silence (Daedalic Entertainment)
- Best story: Silence (Daedalic Entertainment)
- Best Graphics: Silence (Daedalic Entertainment)
- Best technical performance: The Climb (Crytek)
- Best VR / AR Experience: The Climb (Crytek)
- Best studio: Mimimi Productions
- Special prize for social commitment: engagement in the German Dev Days and for the family of the deceased Frank Fitzner (Stefan Marcinek)
- Innovation Award: AirConsole (N-Dream)
- Best PC / console game: Shadow Tactics: Blades of the Shogun (Mimimi Productions, Daedalic Entertainment)
- Best online game: Portal Knights (KeenGames)
- Best Mobile Game: Skyhill (Mandragora, Daedalic Entertainment)
- Best Indie Game: The Lion's Song (Mi'pu'mi Games)
- Hall of Fame: Ingo Horn
- Dealer of the Year: Media Markt
- Best German game: Shadow Tactics: Blades of the Shogun (Mimimi Productions, Daedalic Entertainment)
- WTF of the year: Deponia Doomsday: Exclusive first sale in "Computer Bildspiele" (Daedalic Entertainment)
- Special prize AR / VR: Accounting (Crows Crows Crows)
- Blue Byte Newcomer Award Place 1: Cubiverse (Ludamus, MDH Munich)
- Blue Byte Newcomer Award # 2: Elena (Catch A Cat, HdM Stuttgart)
- Blue Byte Newcomer Award 3rd place: Super Dashmatch (BerlinGamesClub, GamesAcademy Berlin)

== See also ==
- Deutscher Computerspielpreis
