= Valhalla Hills =

2015 video game

- Steam version art
- Developer: Funatics Software
- Publisher: Daedalic Entertainment
- Engine: Unreal Engine 4
- Platforms: Windows; Linux; MacOS
- Release: WW: 2 December 2015
- Genre: City building
- Mode: Single-player

Valhalla Hills is a 2015 video game developed by Funatics Software and published by Daedalic Entertainment. The game is a city-building and strategy game in which players control a tribe of Vikings to build and maintain a settlement with the objective of reaching a portal atop a mountain to enter Valhalla. Upon release, Valhalla Hills received mixed reviews, with critics praising the visual design and presentation of the game and pace, but critiquing the implementation of its gameplay mechanics and replayability. Following release, Funatics developed two pieces of downloadable content, Fire Mountains and Sand of the Damned, introducing locations and enemies, and compiled them in a Definitive Edition published in 2017.

== Gameplay ==
Players manage settlements by constructing buildings to acquire raw materials, food and other resources.

Players manage a settlement inhabited by Viking villagers that autonomously collect resources and fight enemies. The player controls the settlement by selecting and constructing buildings and is required to balance the needs of the settlement to acquire and sustain raw materials and food, and addressing enemies by either building military structures requiring weapons from mined materials, or building temples to pacify the enemy with their own building requirements. The game features a 'Campaign' mode in which new buildings, upgrades and systems are incrementally introduced, and an 'Open' mode where all features are available from the start of the game, as well as the presence of more difficult enemies.

Players can also expand their settlement across randomly generated maps, with each map presenting different terrain, resources, and challenges. Efficient planning is important, as Vikings need food, resources, housing and other facilities to keep the settlement functioning. Players must develop their settlement while preparing to reach the portal at the top of the mountain, which is often guarded by enemies.

== Development and release ==
Valhalla Hills was developed by Funatics Software, a German studio whose CEO Thomas Häuser had previously been involved creating The Settlers II and proceeded to form Funatics in 1998 to create the Cultures series of real-time city building games. The developers stated they set out to create Valhalla Hills to make a "classical building game" similar to the Cultures titles, with the game developed by a team of nine from January 2015 and built in Unreal Engine 4. Funatics released the game for early access in August 2015, and in October provided an update that introduced an 'Open Game' mode, providing the player with all features unlocked at a higher level of difficulty. Valhalla Hills exited Early Access for full release in December 2015, with additional game modes and bugfixes. A Definitive Edition of Valhalla Hills was released on 28 February 2017, combining the content from the Sand of the Damned and Fire Mountains DLC.

== Reception ==
Reception

Aggregate score
Aggregator	Score
Metacritic	69%

Review scores
Publication	Score
Hardcore Gamer	3.5/5
IGN	7.2
PC Games (DE)	7/10
Escapist Magazine	4/5 stars
GamePlanet	6/10

According to review aggregator Metacritic, Valhalla Hills received "mixed or average" reviews from critics. Evaluating the early access version, Alexander Bohn-Elias of Eurogamer considered the game to not be bad and ideal for quick play, praising the "wonderfully lit and charmingly populated mountain islands", but felt the game lacked longevity or replayability in its current state. Marsh Davies of Rock Paper Shotgun, also appraising the early access version, found potential in the underlying systems and described the pace of the game to be "pretty and peaceful", but critiqued the lack of "significant player agency", the "obscure" interpretation of villager behaviours and the effects of player actions. Mark Steighner of Hardcore Gamer commended the "charming presentation" and "relatively complex and robust" gameplay systems, but noted its lack of features, including a story-driven campaign, multiplayer or map editors, limited its "breadth of content". Stefan Weiß of PC Games considered the game to feature a "charmingly implemented setting" with "loving details" reminiscent of classic city-building games, but felt the game had "plenty of room for improvement", noting the "unnecessarily tricky micromanagement", the "fiddly logistics and transport system", and a lack of long-term goals or scenarios. Hannah Douglass of GamePlanet described the game as "charming" and "addictive", finding it "immensely satisfying" when systems work, but stating the game "lacks compelling problem-solving scenarios, is too repetitive, and has players relying too much trial and error to progress". Jose Rodriguez of IGN Spain, reviewing the console Definitive Edition, described the game as "a technical, fun game with a lot to explore", found the expansions added a "lot of use" to the gameplay and encouraged "deeper exploration", also highlighting the "friendly and pleasant designs" that maintained the appeal of the PC version.
