= Gomo =

Gomo may refer to:

- Chief Gomo, Pottawatomie chieftain
- GoMo, Irish mobile virtual network operator owned by Eir
- Gomo, Singaporean mobile virtual network operator owned by Singtel
- Gomo (musician), Portuguese Indie musician
- GOMO PH, Philippine mobile virtual network operator owned by Globe Telecom
- Gomo, Tibet
- Gomo (video game), a video game developed by Fishcow Games
