= Goodbye Deponia =

2013 video game

- Developer: Daedalic Entertainment
- Publisher: Daedalic Entertainment
- Platforms: Windows, OS X, Linux, PlayStation 4, Xbox One, Nintendo Switch
- Release: Windows, OS X; 17 October 2013; Linux; 8 July 2014; PlayStation 4, Xbox One; 30 January 2019; Nintendo Switch; 23 December 2019
- Genre: Graphic adventure
- Mode: Single-player

Goodbye Deponia is a graphic adventure video game developed and published by Daedalic Entertainment. It is the sequel to Chaos on Deponia.

== Synopsis ==
Anti-hero Rufus still lives on the planet Deponia which is nothing more than a dump. He still wishes to become an inhabitant of Elysium, the flying city. Furthermore, he wants to stop the Organon. This military organization deceived the Elysian government by telling them Deponia is not inhabited anymore and it would be better to blow up the planet. Rufus gets help from pirate Bozo, the Elysium girl Goal, and the resistance.

== Plot ==
En route to the upper ascension station via Bozo's cruiser, Rufus and Goal get stuck on an Organon cruiser behind them. While trying to save Goal, Rufus meets Barry, his biggest fan who wants to watch Rufus in action. Rufus frees Goal, destroying Bozo's cruiser in the process.

Rufus, Goal, Doc and Bozo are forced to continue their trip to the upper ascension station in Porta Fisco by foot. They overnight in a hotel. There, Doc and Bozo set up a lab so the three Goal personalities can be finally merged. Doc and Bozo deceive Rufus by telling him he must look for an important object (of which they think does not exist).

Meanwhile, Argus sends Cletus and Opperbot on a mission to find Goal after they noticed they captured Donna instead of Goal. Rufus finds out Cletus has the important object in his room. Once in possession he returns to the lab but it seems the operation is already finished with success. A furious Rufus leaves the lab and runs into Argus who just arrived with Donna. After some hide-and-seek, Rufus (currently wearing Cletus' clothes) can convince Argus he is Cletus (Rufus and Cletus are look-alikes). A disguised Goal claims to be Donna. The plan works and Argus takes them to the last Organon-cruiser in Porta Fisco.

Aboard the cruiser, Rufus removes his disguise before being warned about the cameras in the room. He attempts to erase the footage and Goal is taken to be interrogated by Argus in the process. Rufus sneaks in inside a torture bot as Argus reveals his plan to conquer Elysium and wants Goal by his side. Much to Goal and Rufus' surprise, Argus removes his helmet to reveal he also looks just like Rufus. Rufus tries to free Goal by pushing random buttons but ends up injecting her with a lethal shot of Sodium Amytal. As she dies, she admits her love for Rufus, while a devastated and helpless Rufus looks on at the tragic event. Angered and saddened, Argus then orders the guards to have the bot (not knowing Rufus is inside) thrown overboard.

Rufus ends up in a room similar to the tutorial of each game. He believes the room is Hell due to the repeated process of being killed by the crusher and returning to the room. Further investigation reveals the room is actually a cloning facility. Rufus manages to get past the machinery to find a man resembling Death. Rufus follows the man and finds out his name is Hermes. Hermes admits that he is responsible for the situation Rufus finds himself in. He discovered Utopia and got the idea to make Elysium to fly there. He thought up the idea to destroy Deponia to power Elysium, having forgotten that people still live there. He also created a line of clone workers to do the work. Hermes explains that Rufus, Cletus, and Argus are the last living prototypes of the clones. Rufus becomes infuriated and vandalizes the facility. Hermes becomes depressed and kills himself.

Suddenly, a dead woman falls out of the sky. Rufus recognizes Goal and wants to ask Hermes if there is a way to clone her. However, Hermes just committed suicide so Rufus first has to clone him. Once succeeded Goal is also cloned. However, she returns as a baby and falls in the drain. Rufus has three problems which must be solved at same time: to rescue baby Goal, to prevent the invasion of the Organon in Elysium and to prevent Deponia to be blown up. That's why he clones himself twice which means there are now three "Ruffi".

One Rufus ends up aboard the last Organon-cruiser while the other two end up in the resistance headquarters. They find the Captain Seagull is still alive and is the new leader. He's planning to fire a cannon at Elysium to prevent Deponia from being destroyed. One Rufus convinces him to hold off the attack until he can age Goal back to an adult. Seagull is really only allowing it hoping Rufus will fail and finally acknowledge how much of a failure Seagull thinks he is. Rufus ages baby Goal but she is in fact revealed to be a clone of Donna rather than Goal. Seagull demands Rufus gives up and resorts to threatening one clone with a gun while the other points out Rufus' faults. Rufus' deceased adoptive mother is mentioned pushing Seagull to fire the gun. The other resistance members intervene and the shot instead hits the other clone. Rufus carries his wounded clone to an escape vehicle but accidentally backs it into the cannon preventing it from being fired.

Meanwhile, the Rufus on the cruiser has been working with Cletus, (whom he mistakes for one of the other Rufus clones). He makes the discovery that Goal was saved after the lethal injection incident. She's thrown from the cruiser and Rufus follows her on Opperbot. At the headquarters, Rufus is mourning the death of the other Rufus. Seagull prepares to kill Rufus when the Rufus riding Opperbot crashes into him killing them both. The last remaining Rufus reunites with Goal and apologizes to her and everyone for having doomed them all. However, Goal convinces everyone to give Rufus another chance pointing out it's thanks to him Deponia has not yet been destroyed. The resistance looks to Rufus for one last crazy idea. Rufus decides they will all cram into the vehicle inside the cannon and fire it at the cruiser.

The plan succeeds although Rufus is seen as Argus and taken to Ulysses, the leader of the Organon. Argus who was also on the ship reveals that once his army reaches Elysium, he will use his army to take over. Ulysses not wanting a coup to occur stops the Highboat while they are still in the range of the explosion, in hopes of saving his daughter Goal who he thinks is in Elysium. Goal shows up on the bridge, in hopes of convincing her father to stop Deponia's destruction. However, the irreversible process for the detonation already started.

Rufus convinces Argus and Cletus to cooperate in order to destroy the transmitter of the bomb, while the people on the Highboat escape to Elysium by climbing the wires. Argus tricks Cletus to seemingly fall to his death, and after stopping the transmitter tries to coerce Rufus into joining him in his plan to take over Elysium. Cletus comes back and attacks Argus which caused all three get stuck in the rotor which balances the cruiser. They are found by Goal who can only rescue one of them. She decides only to rescue Rufus but as the three wear the same outfit she does not know who Rufus actually is.

Ultimately, Rufus tells Goal that Cletus is actually Rufus and lets go to fall back to Deponia (fully aware that he knows that Goal still loves Cletus). Goal saves Cletus while Barry follows Rufus down, congratulating him for his selfless action and for saving everyone.

Goal takes “Rufus” to the council of Elysium. The council is concerned: due to the new situation Elysium is overpopulated and there are not enough resources. That's why they have the intention to destroy Elysium and move back to Deponia. Goal tells the council to listen to the advice of "Rufus". Cletus decides to give up his old identity and to live as Rufus from that point onward. Goal then leaves the scene and goes to a perch overlooking Deponia. She sighs hinting that he knew she picked Cletus over Rufus. It is not revealed whether the real Rufus survived the fall or not.

== Reception ==
Reception

Aggregate score
Aggregator	Score
Metacritic	(NS) 77/100 (PC) 80/100

Review scores
Publication	Score
4Players	85%
Adventure Gamers	4/5
GameStar	91/100
PC Games (DE)	9/10
Gameswelt	9.0/10

Goodbye Deponia received "generally favorable" reviews, according to review aggregator Metacritic.

German publication Golem.de declared Goodbye Deponia a commercial hit. The game debuted in first place on the GfK Entertainment Charts' weekly computer game sales rankings, and sold 10,000 units in its first seven days across Germany, Switzerland and Austria. Half of these sales came from online stores such as Steam. Carsten Fichtelmann of Daedalic Entertainment noted that these numbers were "a record for us", and that they marked the first time in 15 years that an adventure game had reached first place on the German market's weekly sales charts. However, he criticized brick and mortar retailers for understocking the game and "driv[ing] customers to digital purchases, or to mail-order companies like Amazon". Adventure Gamers awarded it the "Best Traditional Adventure" and one of the top 5 "Best Adventures" in their 2013 Aggie Awards.

According to Daedalic, Goodbye Deponia achieved strong international sales in its opening week.
