= Deponia Doomsday =

2016 video game

- Developer: Daedalic Entertainment
- Publisher: Daedalic Entertainment
- Platforms: Microsoft Windows; OS X; Linux; Xbox One; PlayStation 4; Nintendo Switch; Amazon Luna
- Release: Windows, OS X, Linux; 1 March 2016; PlayStation 4, Xbox One; 27 February 2019; Nintendo Switch; 23 December 2019; Amazon Luna; 20 October 2020
- Genres: Graphic adventure, Point-and-click Adventure
- Mode: Single-player

Deponia Doomsday is a graphic adventure video game developed and published by Daedalic Entertainment. It is the sequel to Goodbye Deponia. The first three parts are considered a trilogy. This installment is "paralellic."

== Gameplay ==
The game follows the principles of a classic point-and-click adventure: the user controls Rufus as he travels across highly detailed backgrounds as the plot continues. Rufus can startup conversations with other characters and put items in his inventory for later use. These items, combined or not, are used to solve puzzles and advance the story. Furthermore, the game has some optional minigames.

== Story ==
=== Prologue ===
The Elysian Goal summarises the history Elysium, a spaceship which was meant to reach a new planet by blowing up Deponia, the trash planet it orbits. Things changed unexpectedly thanks to Rufus, a Deponian who sacrificed himself to prove to Elysium the planet is inhabited, making the original plan unconscionable. Goal finishes her story but wonders what she would change if she were able to travel back in time and if these actions could lead to a better ending to her story.

The game shows Elysium falling onto a snow covered Deponia, where an old Rufus, who somehow survived, is followed by Fewlocks (a parody of the Morlocks from H. G. Wells 1895 novel, The Time Machine). Rufus then activates the mechanism to explode the planet.

=== The game ===
A young Rufus awakes, having seemingly dreamt what happened in the first 3 games and the prologue. He uses this knowledge of the future to try to prevent his break up with his girlfriend Toni, ensuring Toni's favourite drinking glasses stay intact, but is unsuccessful due to the intervention of a pink elephant. He teams up with Professor McChronicle, an expert in temporary physics, who was studying a time anomaly close-by, and Tuck, a local drunk. McChronicle's car is a time machine that saves a point in time, to which they can return later. Turning back time resets everyone's memories, only McChronicle, who wears a special tinfoil hat, Tuck, who is given a tinfoil hat to help distract the elephant, and Rufus, who is immune for unknown reasons, remember what happened.

After saving his relationship, it immediately breaks down another way. Rufus decides to give up on Toni and to pursue an ending similar to that in his dream/vision, but without his sacrifice this time. While on the run after his escape plan caught the town ablaze, Rufus meets the "elephant", although it is just 2 men in disguise as they do not want to reveal their identity. They try to preserve the timeline as it was before, but he catapults them away. Rufus and McChronicle find the elephants time travelling shuttle in an abandoned shopping mall, and Rufus decides to go directly to Elysium with it. However, they end up in Elysium after it had already crashed on Deponia's surface. There he meets a future version of Goal, who remembers him from the events of the Deponia-trilogy.

McChronicle, Goal and Rufus use the time pod again and end up in an earlier Elysium when it was still intact, on the day on which Goal's younger version and Cletus leave for Deponia. With Rufus happy on Elysium and McChronicle determined to stop messing with time, Goal steals the pod to pursue her own happy end. Rufus tries to stop the Goal of the current timeline from leaving to Deponia, but they narrowly miss each other. Undeterred, Rufus enjoys a full day on Elysium, figuring Goal will come back one day, and all he needs to do to save Deponia this time is speak to the Elders of Elysium, no sacrifice needed. However, in the evening time is reset to right after Rufus and Goal miss one another in the morning: Someone is using McChronicle's time machine, and without a tinfoil hat, will continue to do so every day for eternity while they are stuck on Elysium. Repeating the same day forever does not sound bad to Rufus, he just aims to share this day with Goal.

To set up his meeting with the council, he gives Ronny, the AI controlling everything on Elysium, a tinfoil hat. Rufus also accidentally erases Ronny's security protocols and creates the Fewlocks in the DNA database. Fewlocks start overrunning Elysium, but Rufus learns the emergency codes before time is reset. Using the codes to fake blowing Elysium up, Rufus is able to convince Goal to stay and talk with him. To his confusion, they are interrupted by Fewlocks, although he has not created them yet.

Rufus, Goal and McChronicle escape with a parachute and end up in a run-down amusement park. To stop the loop, they figure they need to stop this timeline's McChronicle from arriving at Rufus' village. There is a "Love boat" to the right place, but the owner wants them to prove their love with a photo. But Rufus and Goal do not get along well, Goal wants to go on the exciting adventure for her first time, while Rufus, having already experienced it, just wants to reach his happy end. They trick the owner with a picture of them with a dummy doll. The boat turns out to be too slow and the McChronicle of this timeline left the university hours before they arrive. When all hope seems lost and the other just wait for the next loop, Rufus reignites everyone's spirit by completing a machine to create wormholes to "interim time".

Interim time connects all the wormholes Rufus opened from all kinds of pasts and presents. Time inside passes faster compared to outside. The future notably does not exist any longer because of the time loop, so trash from Deponia's past that falls into the wormholes just piles up. They meet an old goal who stole the time pod but crashed when the future stopped existing. Through a series of wormholes they reach Elysium, where it is revealed Ronny created the hordes of Fewlocks as cruel entertainment. They remove Ronny's tinfoil hat and flush all Fewlocks into interim time.

Rufus and the younger Goal end up in the time when McChronicle's was driving to Rufus just outside the village. They convince McChronicle to leave, ending the time loop. Next they are taken as prisoner by the "pink elephant": they are inhabitants of Utopia who were trying to observe without interfering. The people of Elysium were originally able to reach the planet Utopia without destroying Deponia after all, but the timeline interferences caused Elysium to crash into Utopia instead. They try to correct history to what it once was. They were the ones using McChronicle's car to get their stolen time pod back. Not much later, the Rufus of this timeline turns up and is captured as well. One Rufus shall get his memory erased so that he saves both Deponia and Utopia by sacrificing himself, the other and the time-travelling young goal shall be "iced".

The memory erased Rufus fulfils his quest, but is saved last minute by the goal that stole the time pod. Without the loop, she cannot crash and travels to the correct time. The Utopians try to foil her rescue attempt by causing her time pod to crash, but Rufus lands safely onto it. Goal however is dead on the spot. A distraught Rufus pushes random buttons on the pod, causing the Fewlocks from the interim time to swarm Deponia. This is when the Prologue happens, Elysium falls and old Rufus destroys Deponia. The Goal and Rufus who were "iced" - cryogenically frozen as it turns out - thaw out just before the bombs explode and turn back time with McChronicles car to the beginning of the game.

The Utopians are now fully stuck as well in a time loop of hunting down the Rufus that is on Elysium during the first loop, dealing with the future goal after the first loop is cleared up, and erasing and icing the memories of Goal and Rufus who then start the bigger loop. However, in one of the thousands or millions of loops, Rufus manages to get into the backseat of the time machine before it is stolen by Goal. He convinces her that his story is truly over, and that the only thing she can get with the time machine is saying a proper thank you. He and his other self properly sacrifice themselves, the past will no longer repeat, allowing time to move forward and saving both Deponia and Utopia.

=== Epilogue ===
In the final scene the Utopians have taken Goal that stole the pod to the crashed Elysium of her time. She settles on Deponia and grieves on the knowledge that nobody will remember Rufus nor what he did to prevent the demolition of Deponia and that he is the true hero that saved the world and gave them back their future. She also wonders if there is another Goal having exciting and fun adventures with the other Rufus in another timeline somewhere and looks forward to finding out if that is true or not. For now, she decides to help her people build the civilization and the future Rufus made possible for his noble sacrifice.

== Reception ==
Reception

Aggregate score
Aggregator	Score
Metacritic	76/100

Review scores
Publication	Score
4Players	82%
GameStar	89/100
Hardcore Gamer	3.5/5
PC Games (DE)	85%
Gameswelt	9.0/10

Deponia Doomsday received "generally favorable" reviews, according to review aggregator Metacritic.

Adam Beck of Hardcore Gamer gave the game a 3.5 out of 5 saying, "Deponia Doomsday is a charming adventure that brings back all the humor from the past, but derives its puzzles on obscurities and trial and error."
