= Aer: Memories of Old =

2017 video game

- Developer: Forgotten Key
- Publisher: Daedalic Entertainment
- Engine: Unity
- Platforms: Microsoft Windows; PlayStation 4 Xbox One; Nintendo Switch
- Release: Windows, PS4, Xbox One; October 25, 2017; Nintendo Switch; August 28, 2019
- Genre: Action-adventure
- Mode: Single-player

Aer: Memories of Old (stylized as AER: Memories of Old) is an indie action-adventure open world video game developed by Forgotten Key and published by Daedalic Entertainment. It was released on October 25, 2017, for Microsoft Windows, PlayStation 4 and Xbox One, and on August 28, 2019, for Nintendo Switch. The game's story revolves around a girl named Auk who can shapeshift into a bird. Set on floating islands, the main character must solve puzzles, discovering ruins left by an ancient civilization. The game received mixed reviews from critics, who praised its aesthetic and world but criticized its short length and overall lack of action.

== Reception ==
Reception

Aggregate scores
Aggregator	Score
Metacritic	PC: 69/100; PS4: 70/100; XONE: 71/100; NS: 73/100
OpenCritic	67/100; 37% Critics Recommend

Robert Ramsey of Push Square rated the game 8/10 stars, calling it "simple, elegant and impactful", and comparing it to Journey and Abzû.

Jack Yarwood of PC Gamer rated the game 77/100, calling the graphics beautiful and saying that the flying mechanics felt "wonderful", but at the same time commenting on its short length and the fact that the game's interiors were confusing.

Todd Rigney of Adventure Gamers rated the game 3/5 stars, calling its world quirky and rich, but criticizing its lack of puzzle diversity that made the gameplay "weak". He stated that, while the game was charming, it was notably flawed.
