= The Long Journey Home (video game) =

2017 video game

- Developer: Daedalic Entertainment
- Publisher: Daedalic Entertainment
- Writer: Richard Cobbett
- Platforms: Windows; macOS; PlayStation 4; Xbox One; Nintendo Switch
- Release: Windows; May 30, 2017 macOS; June 28, 2018; PlayStation 4, Xbox One; November 14, 2018; Nintendo Switch; September 4, 2019
- Genre: Adventure
- Mode: Single-player

The Long Journey Home is a 2017 space exploration video game by Daedalic Entertainment for Windows, macOS, PlayStation 4, Xbox One, and Nintendo Switch.

== Plot ==
The player controls the crew of Earth's first jump-capable starship. The game begins after a jump to Alpha Centauri goes wrong, leaving the misfit crew stranded on the far end of the galaxy. As the crew journeys back home, they meet aliens who offer them various quests.

== Features ==
The goal of the game is to return home after being lost in space. The player navigates a procedurally generated universe, which is randomized to make the experience of exploring more open-ended and diverse.

The physics of ship movement are realistic, as the player has to use gravitational slingshot to navigate. There is a steep learning curve to be proficient to travel.

The player will encounter aliens who offer them quests. The player can choose to help, ignore, attack, or even betray the quest-giver. For example, when an alien asks a player to transport a box, the player can decide to open the box and steal what's inside of it. Each alien has their own culture, which creates challenges around cultural misunderstanding.

== Development ==
Daedalic was a game studio known for point-and-click adventure games with a narrative focus. The team has described the game as a roguelike space role-playing game, drawing its main inspiration from Star Control II and Starflight. Where Star Control II described many aspects of the alien cultures through dialog, writer Richard Cobbett pushed to improve on this by making this culture more visible and interactive.

The team strived to maximize player choice, allowing them to break or ignore quests, or attack even friendly encounters. Quests were designed to encourage forward momentum, and also illustrate the different alien cultures and personalities. This led to what Cobbett described as "a lot of writing", which was organized in spreadsheets using proprietary tools. A goal for the game's writing was to create feelings of loneliness, vulnerability, and desperation.

Initially, the game featured a trade system, but this was simplified in favor of credits. A month after the game's release, The Long Journey Home was updated with an easier story mode.

== Reception ==
Reception

Aggregate score
Aggregator	Score
Metacritic	PC: 68/100

The reception to The Long Journey Home has been mixed. Its aggregate Metacritic score is 68/100. Adam Smith of Rock Paper Shotgun compared the game favorably to the openness of No Man's Sky with the short minigames of Weird Worlds: Return to Infinite Space, but felt that there was "not quite enough here to win me over completely". Polygon, giving the game a 55% rating, explained that it was "extraordinarily difficult to navigate" and "infuriating," concluding that the game had failed to live up to the promise of a "truly narrative-driven roguelike." Giving the game a 6/10, PC Games N praised the characters and setting, but criticized the different minigames as tedious. IGN, which gave the game a 6.4, complained of "the weight of frustrating and tedious minigames" that were "often unfair." Kotaku dismissed the game as built upon "a poorly-implemented version" of Lunar Lander, "an infuriating experience" and "a poorly thought-out homage."
