= The Suicide of Rachel Foster =

2020 video game

- Cover art featuring Rachel Foster's retainer
- Developer: One-O-One Games
- Publisher: Daedalic Entertainment
- Director: Daniele Azara
- Programmer: Lorenzo Bellincampi
- Writer: Daniele Azara
- Composer: Federico Landini
- Engine: Unreal Engine 4
- Platforms: Windows; PlayStation 4; Xbox One; Nintendo Switch
- Release: Windows; February 19, 2020; PlayStation 4, Xbox One; September 9, 2020; Nintendo Switch; October 31, 2021
- Genre: Adventure
- Mode: Single-player

The Suicide of Rachel Foster is a 2020 adventure video game developed by One-O-One Games and published by Daedalic Entertainment. Set in December 1993, the story follows Nicole Wilson returning to her family's hotel to inspect and sell it. Ten years prior, Nicole and her mother left the Timberline Hotel after learning of her father's affair with the teenaged Rachel Foster. After being forced to stay longer than expected due to a snowstorm, Nicole decides to investigate Rachel's mysterious suicide with the assistance of the Federal Emergency Management Agency (FEMA) agent Irving Crawford, her only contact with the outside world. The player controls Nicole as she navigates the Timberline Hotel, collecting various items to solve puzzles and progress with the story, all the while using a mobile phone to converse with Irving.

One-O-One Games aimed to make a horror game that created fear from suspense rather than traditional monsters, developing the narrative and gameplay simultaneously to complement each other. The game was set in a hotel due to the developers' belief this would elicit fear and claustrophobia in players; in particular, the Overlook Hotel from the horror film The Shining (1980) served as inspiration for the Timberline Hotel. One-O-One Games designed The Suicide of Rachel Foster as a walking simulator to explore real-life topics, due to the genre's focus on narrative and exploration. They sought professional advice to portray delicate topics such as child sexual abuse and suicide compassionately.

Daedalic released The Suicide of Rachel Foster for Windows in February 2020, for PlayStation 4 and Xbox One in September 2020, and for Nintendo Switch in October 2021. The game received mixed reviews from critics. Praise was aimed at the setting and sound design, as well as at Nicole and Irving, their relationship, and the actors' performances. The plot and mystery, as well as some gameplay aspects, received a mixed reception. Critics responded negatively to the depiction of child sexual abuse and suicide, arguing the game does not handle these topics sensitively; the ending was criticized for forcing players to participate in an interactive suicide attempt. A sequel, Curse of the Crimson Stag (originally titled The Fading of Nicole Wilson) was announced in October 2024 and is set to release in 2026.

== Gameplay ==
Nicole interacting with a mobile phone she uses to talk to Irving

The Suicide of Rachel Foster is a mystery-thriller adventure game played from a first-person perspective. The player controls Nicole Wilson as she explores the Timberline Hotel which is owned by her family. She uses a mobile phone to communicate with Irving Crawford and the player chooses responses in a dialogue tree. During the game, Nicole has to solve environmental puzzles to progress the story, such as acquiring a screwdriver or finding a generator switch. She also has a map of the hotel, with objectives marked on it.

As the game progresses, Nicole acquires a Polaroid camera, a mechanically powered flashlight, and a parabolic microphone, which are needed to solve certain puzzles; at one point during a blackout, the flash from the Polaroid camera acts as her only light source.

== Plot ==
In December 1993, Nicole Wilson reads a letter from her dead mother, Claire, instructing Nicole to inspect the Timberline Hotel and sell it. Her father, Leonard McGrath, who was the owner of the mountain hotel in the Helena National Forest, in Lewis and Clark County, Montana, has recently died. In 1983, Leonard groomed and impregnated Nicole's 16-year-old classmate Rachel Foster, whom he tutored. When the affair was discovered, Rachel killed herself nine weeks into her pregnancy and Claire left town with Nicole.

Nicole receives a call from the Federal Emergency Management Agency (FEMA) agent Irving Crawford when she reaches the Timberline. Irving informs Nicole that he will assist her during her stay and warns her against leaving due to a heavy snowstorm that started after her arrival. Nicole questions his knowledge of the hotel and Rachel and Leonard's relationship; Irving reveals he was often sent by FEMA to provide supplies to the Timberline Hotel. After Nicole's lawyer tells her he cannot make it due to the snowstorm, Irving instructs her to inspect the Timberline's second floor. Although the hotel's phone lines have not worked for months, Nicole receives a call on a hotel phone warning her not to sell the hotel because "Rachel is still there". Nicole discovers a recently opened lipstick and decides to investigate, believing that Rachel is still alive.

On Christmas Eve, Nicole wakes up in a church that is connected to the hotel through an underground passage, having sleepwalked there. Remembering a rhyme that Leonard taught her to find a secret storeroom inside the passage, she discovers a room modeled after Rachel's bedroom and she assumes someone—likely Rachel—had been living there. Nicole also discovers the key to her music box. She goes back to her bedroom and when she opens the music box, Nicole remembers that on December 27, 1983—the date Rachel supposedly killed herself—she was playing a hockey game that Claire had driven her to.

A day later, Nicole investigates a storeroom with mannequins in a tableau depicting a pregnant woman being killed by someone with a hockey stick. Nicole realizes the stick belonged to her and calls Irving, who ignores her distress and tells her to continue her search. On the second floor, she finds the door leading to the previously locked west wing, now unlocked. There she discovers Irving's empty room. He reveals that he was behind the hotel's strange occurrences and he has been using Nicole to uncover what had happened to Rachel who was his older sister. Irving tells her their household was abusive and Rachel was his only source of comfort. She was bullied for her dyslexia and Irving argues that Leonard was the only person who offered her comfort and support.

Nicole goes to the attic and finds a recording Leonard had made asking her to find out what happened to Rachel along with the keys to Claire's car. When she opens the trunk, she finds a blood-stained blanket and recalls a repressed memory that lets her piece together the events from the night Rachel died. Nicole realizes that Claire murdered Rachel with her hockey stick and then put Rachel's body in the trunk of her car, before driving Nicole to her game. While Nicole was playing, Claire briefly left to frame Rachel's death as a suicide. Irving thanks Nicole, who is devastated at the realization that her mother murdered Rachel, for uncovering the truth and goes out into the cold to die. As the signal cuts out, Nicole begs him to not leave her alone before hearing footsteps that she believes belong to Rachel.

After some time, Nicole is in her car planning to take her life via carbon monoxide poisoning. She receives a call from her lawyer and she informs him she will not sell the hotel, then she starts the engine and hallucinates talking to her parents. If the player lets the engine continue running, she dies. However, if the player turns the engine off, she promises her parents to redevelop the Timberline Hotel.

== Development ==
The Suicide of Rachel Foster was developed by the Italian studio One-O-One Games—using Unreal Engine 4—and published by Daedalic Entertainment. It was directed by Daniele Azara and the music was composed by Federico Landini. According to One-O-One, The Suicide of Rachel Foster was born out of the studio's desire to create a psychological horror game that evoked "unease and fear" but did not have to rely on using traditional monsters or tropes. One-O-One Games intended from the start of development for the narrative and gameplay to complement each other, rather than finishing the story and then choosing an appropriate gameplay style. The Suicide of Rachel Foster was designed as a walking simulator due to the genre's emphasis on narrative which allowed for the exploration of real-life topics.

The developers, according to One-O-One director Daniele Azara, wished to portray topics such as child sexual abuse, grief, and suicide with compassion so they sought advice from partners and professionals. The team wanted players to reflect on the topics as they felt that facilitates healing. The relationship between Rachel and Leonard was presented from various perspectives as developers were "interested in the moral dilemmas" and they hoped players would critically evaluate it and the repercussions the relationship had on the characters around them. Irving and Leonard condoning the latter's relationship with Rachel was included to show how people's emotions can blind them and cause them to justify acts they would otherwise see as immoral. Azara stated that as Rachel and Leonard never appear in the game, their relationship being explored through Nicole and Irving and how they were affected by it and its tragic consequences was "central to the horror experience". According to One-O-One, Nicole potentially killing herself at the end depending on the player's choices was something they felt was in line with the game's themes and they viewed it as an "intriguing game mechanic".

One-O-One Games set the game in a hotel, believing that players would experience fear and claustrophobia in an indoor environment. They implemented architectural and proportional studies to create the hotel, so players could identify with it and be interested in exploring it. The hotel's design drew heavily from the Overlook Hotel, the main setting of Stanley Kubrick's The Shining (1980), to unconsciously instill unease and fear in players. The developers set the story in Montana as it allowed them to place the Timberline in an isolated area, and the "religious population and legal framework" of the state provided a "plausible setting for the narrative of psychological horror and moral taboo [they] were making".

== Release ==
After being first revealed during Gamescom 2018, The Suicide of Rachel Foster was released on Windows on February 19, 2020. The PlayStation 4 and Xbox One versions were initially set for an August 26 release, but were postponed to September 9. It was released on the Nintendo Switch on October 31, 2021.

== Reception ==
=== Critical response ===
Reception

Aggregate scores
Aggregator	Score
Metacritic	PC: 63/100; PS4: 58/100; XONE: 68/100
OpenCritic	34%

Review scores
Publication	Score
IGN	7/10
Jeuxvideo.com	11/20
PC Gamer	40/100
ProSieben Games	2/5

According to review aggregator platform Metacritic, all versions of The Suicide of Rachel Foster received "mixed or average reviews". OpenCritic reported that 34% of 60 critics recommended the game.

The setting—the Timberline Hotel—and the sound design were praised. Jens Bremicker of ProSieben Games and Jerome Joffard of Jeuxvideo.com complimented the hotel's design. Rachel Watts of PC Gamer viewed the environment as engaging and capable of creating tension, while Eurogamer's Edwin Evans-Thirlwell described the hotel as scary and its design as "predatory". The sound design was praised by Bremicker for creating an appropriate atmosphere, and by IGN Hungary's Péter Nagy for creating a sense of loneliness.

Despite the Timberline's positive reception, there was criticism over the lack of engagement with the setting and its puzzles. Joffard criticized how the linearity of the plot prevented a proper exploration of the entire hotel. Alice Bell of Rock Paper Shotgun, while appreciating the hotel's design, denounced its scope and how puzzle items were rarely required, making them redundant. Bremicker criticized the lack of puzzles, while Evans-Thirlwell found the few existing ones overly simplistic.

The plot and ending received mixed responses from critics. The Washington Post's Christopher Byrd criticized the "lack of scares and the lack of mystery". Joffard described the narrative as unengaging, finding fault with the ending and twists for being inconsistent with the rest of the story. Bell said the ending caused the story to "go 'off the rails'", while Nagy found its twists to be ineffective. Evans-Thirlwell enjoyed the first half, but criticized the second half and ending as melodramatic. Watts stated that while the game initially showed promise—appearing to be a ghost story—it eventually became a "melodramatic soap opera". Though Bremicker was critical of the plot for taking too long to truly begin, he praised the ending and its twists.

Nicole, Irving, their relationship, and the voice acting were all commended. Bremicker called Nicole a strong protagonist, showcased through her conversations with Irving and the layout of her room. Evans-Thirlwell praised both characters, described them as "effectively [...] acted", while Bell complimented the voice actors for making the characters interesting, despite their writing. Watts enjoyed their relationship, likening it to Henry and Delilah from Firewatch (2016). Joffard applauded the voice actors for bringing the characters to life, although he criticized scenes in which Irving calls Nicole without being prompted by the player. While Nagy found Nicole and Irving to be unoriginal, he applauded their consistent personalities, voice actors' performances, and their relationship.

The depiction of child sexual abuse regarding Rachel and Leonard's relationship was critiqued. Watts criticized the presentation of Leonard and Rachel's relationship as romantic, Rachel's lack of agency, and the lack of sensitivity in handling child abuse. She argued the game sensationalized child abuse and suicide. NME's Vikki Blake denounced the portrayal of Leonard and Rachel's relationship for making players sympathize with their "romance" and believed the developers failed to make the game's audience to consider its topics. Bell criticized the framing of Rachel as a "star-crossed lover" instead of an abuse victim, and how neither the characters nor the narrative acknowledge Leonard's exploitation of Rachel. Evans-Thirlwell, while acknowledging that how the characters reflect on the relationship is not necessarily indicative of the developers' viewpoints, found fault with the characters' and narrative's framing of Leonard's abuse.

The portrayal of suicide, particularly Nicole's interactive suicide attempt during the ending, was criticized. Bell argued the game does not handle suicide "frankly or sensitively or in a meaningful way", describing Nicole's suicide attempt as random and that it "isn't earned through what the game does up until that moment". Blake denounced the ending and developers' decision to have Nicole try to kill herself, arguing it contrasted with her earlier characterization, and for making players complicit in someone's suicide attempt. Academics Myfanwy King, Tim Marsh, and Zeynep Akcay argued that the game poorly dealt with sensitive topics, particularly suicide. Specifically, they asserted that suicide is employed solely for shock value, which in turn detracted from the game's "potential to tell an emotional story". Moreover, they criticized the ending for forcing players in the position of a character that wishes to commit suicide without offering any "viable alternative or chance to get help", arguing that Nicole's decision to kill herself is an "outcome that feels underserved and insensitive".

=== Accolades ===
The Suicide of Rachel Foster was nominated for the Best Italian Game at the Italian Video Game Awards in 2020, and at the TGM Awards 2020 in the categories Dynamic Adventure and Tell Me a Story. The game won the 2021 Game of the Year from DStars, an Italian developer community award. For her performance as Nicole Wilson, Kosha Engler won the award for Best Female Performance in Gaming at the 2021 One Voice Awards.

== Sequel ==
In October 2024, it was announced that The Suicide of Rachel Foster would be getting a sequel titled The Fading of Nicole Wilson. Developed by One-O-One Games and published by Daedelic Entertainment, Nicole Wilson is set to release in 2025 on Windows, PlayStation 5, Xbox Series X/S, and Nintendo Switch. Described as a "folk-horror adventure" game, Nicole Wilson will focus on Brit, a teenager who joins a ghost-hunting crew and ends up investigating the Timberline Hotel by herself.

In May 2026, the game was rebranded as Curse of the Crimson Stag, set to release later that year.
