= Chaos on Deponia =

2012 video game

- Developer: Daedalic Entertainment
- Publisher: Daedalic Entertainment
- Platforms: Microsoft Windows, OS X, Linux, PlayStation 4, Xbox One, Nintendo Switch
- Release: Microsoft Windows, OS X: GER: 12 October 2012; WW: 6 November 2012; Linux: WW: 8 July 2014; PlayStation 4, Xbox One: WW: 6 December 2017; Nintendo Switch: EU: 27 November 2019; NA: 29 November 2019
- Genres: Graphic adventure, Point-and-click Adventure
- Mode: Single-player

Chaos on Deponia (German: Chaos auf Deponia) is a graphic adventure video game developed and published by Daedalic Entertainment. A sequel to Deponia, it continues the story of the main character Rufus as he attempts to escape from his home planet Deponia.

== Gameplay ==
The core gameplay has remained unchanged from the previous installment. The player controls Rufus across various highly detailed backgrounds, collecting and combining smaller objects and interacting with machines in order to solve puzzles and advance the plot further.

== Plot ==
As Cletus and Goal ascend back to Elysium (after the end of the first game), Rufus builds an elaborate machine to hurl himself at their ascent pod with a giant saw blade. Held at gunpoint by Cletus, Rufus presses an ejector seat button intending to eject Cletus, but instead accidentally ejects Goal. As Rufus tries to save her, Cletus shoots at him, but severs the cable connecting the pod to Elysium; Rufus and Goal plummet back into Deponia's Rust Red Sea, where they are rescued by Captain Bozo and Doc. Cletus' pod smashes into the side of Bailiff Argus' Organon cruiser, which is overseeing the planned destruction of Deponia.

Rufus finds Goal at Doc's workshop in the Floating Black Market, where Doc explains that the fall badly damaged Goal's brain implant, and that the data cartridge would not survive the surgery. He sends Rufus to buy proper data cartridges in his name, but Rufus buys cheap ones, distracted by the offer of a free lollipop. The surgery splits Goal's personality in three parts: "Lady Goal", who represents her high-class Elysian upbringing; "Spunky Goal", her aggressive side; and "Baby Goal", her idealistic side. Doc warns that if Goal's personalities become too independent, it would be impossible to convince them to submit to the surgery to correct it. Rufus follows Goal to the local tavern and attempts to appeal to her separate personalities in various ways. "Spunky Goal" punches Rufus when he tries a pick-up line, leading the barkeep (who dislikes bar brawls) to pit her against Rufus in a duel of "Platypus Bataka" in the marketplace arena; Rufus wins, earning "Spunky Goal's" respect. "Baby Goal" wants to join the local resistance movement against the Organon. While looking for ways to join the "secret" group, Rufus discovers that the "Unorganized Crime" group in the area is in contact with Cletus, who leaves slides detailing the Organon's plan to destroy Deponia. Rufus shows the slides to the resistance and develops a plan to stop the Organon, which convinces "Baby Goal". For "Lady Goal", Rufus is sent to meet Captain Seagull, whom he is shocked to discover is his father, whom Rufus thought had escaped to Elysium. After setting up a proper romantic dinner date with proper etiquette, and a radio receiver to pick up romantic poetry from an actual poet, Rufus finds that Seagull has taken his plan to date "Lady Goal" himself. Seagull then brazenly admits that Rufus is not his real child, that he was a "trash baby" found abandoned in a junk pile near their home village of Kuvaq. Rufus sabotages Seagull's plan by having a platypus fanatic read his platypus poetry instead. "Lady Goal" finds Rufus' efforts to warn her about Seagull to be noble, and agrees to the procedure.

With all three personalities on board, Goal heads to Doc's workshop. When Rufus arrives, the resistance is outside waiting to take Goal's brain implant to stop the Organon themselves, while "Unorganized Crime" is already inside, holding Doc and Goal captive. However, Rufus is then aided by his future self to get inside. Discovering that the "Unorganized Crime" leader Donna has a brain implant as well, Rufus is able to use a remote to transplant "Lady Goal" into her; Donna/Goal then kills the two goons with her, and decides to leave to rejoin Cletus. Donna/Goal explains that Elysium is a spaceship heading for a planet called Utopia, and that the only way to have the power to reach it is to blow up Deponia; otherwise, Elysium will crash into Deponia. Donna/Goal leaves using Donna's submersible, and Rufus pursues aboard Bozo's junk trawler. Back at the Floating Black Market, Argus and his troops meet with Seagull, who revealed Goal had been there, and apparently made a deal with Argus to return her. When Seagull mocks the Organon's incompetence, Argus shoots him, and orders the harbor locked down. Venturing around Porto Fisco and the Rust Red Sea with Bozo's trawler, Rufus tracks Donna/Goal's submersible and attempts to disable it using torpedo dolphins. While Rufus dives down to the sub, Donna/Goal kidnaps the others and takes them (with Rufus being dragged on the ocean floor behind the sub) to the Organon blast tower, where Argus' cruiser is docked to commence Deponia's destruction, where Donna/Goal and her original body, with the other two personalities, meet up with Cletus. Meanwhile, the resistance, which has gathered in larger numbers from Porto Fisco, is attacking the station.

Onboard Argus' cruiser, Rufus finds Cletus apparently fiddling with the bomb controls to set it off. Rufus finds Donna, her remote, and the cartridges for "Baby Goal" and "Spunky Goal", with "Lady Goal" back in Goal's body. When using "Baby Goal" to convince "Lady Goal" fails, Rufus activates "Spunky Goal", causing the Goals to fight. When Rufus attempts to reverse Cletus' sabotage, Cletus explains that he was actually trying to stop the bomb, as he believes that the Organon's plan won't work; the bomb will only destroy the blast tower. Rufus and Cletus then begin fighting as well, alternating Donna-Goal between "Baby" and "Spunky" as she battles "Lady Goal". "Spunky Goal" is able to find the remote to Goal's implant, switching it to the brain-damaged Donna, allowing Rufus to get Goal's remote. But Cletus gains the upper hand and leaves Rufus hanging for dear life as he gloats, only to be punched out by Goal. As she is about to save him, however, Rufus admits that he activated the bomb countdown, which leads her (and the personalities still inside Donna) to turn on him, leaving with Cletus. After throwing Goal's remote with Baby Goal's personality cartridge away, Rufus falls from the tower and lands near the resistance fighters, who find the Organon have evacuated to their cruiser. To Rufus' surprise, Goal arrives a moment later, admitting that while she was tempted to head home, she was missing an important part of herself as well. She also managed to obtain Donna's remote, and is implied to have swapped cartridges to return Donna's original memory to her body. The resistors below watch Argus' cruiser leave just as the tower explodes.

== Reception ==
Reception

Aggregate score
Aggregator	Score
Metacritic	(PC) 78/100 (PS4) 70/100 (XONE) 71/100

Review scores
Publication	Score
4Players	79%
GameStar	90/100
PC Games (DE)	85%
Gameswelt	90%

Chaos on Deponia received "mixed or average" and "generally favorable" reviews, according to review aggregator Metacritic.

Chaos on Deponia and its predecessor, Deponia, totaled 200,000 global sales by April 2013. The Deponia series overall achieved sales of 2.2 million copies by 2016, most of which derived from deep-discount sales, according to Daedalic's Carsten Fichtelmann. He noted that "full price sales were a little part of that [2.2 million] number".
