= Deponija =

Deponija can refer to:

- Deponija, Belgrade, an urban neighborhood of Belgrade, Serbia.
- Deponija, Novi Sad, part of Novi Sad, Serbia.

== See also ==
- Deponia (disambiguation)
