= Daedalic Entertainment =

German video game publisher

Daedalic Entertainment GmbH
- Type: Subsidiary
- Industry: Video games
- Founded: 1 March 2007; 19 years ago
- Founders: Carsten Fichtelmann; Jan "Poki" Müller-Michaelis
- Headquarters: Hamburg, Germany
- Key people: Carsten Fichtelmann (CEO); Stephan Harms (COO); Jan Müller-Michaelis (creative director)
- Number of employees: ~45 (2023)
- Parent: Bastei Lübbe (2014–2020); Nacon (2022–present)
- Website: daedalic.com

Daedalic Entertainment GmbH is a German video game publisher and former developer based in Hamburg. Formed in 2007, they developed various point-and-click adventure games.

== History ==
Daedalic Entertainment was founded on 1 March 2007 in a small Hamburg office by chief executive officer (CEO) Carsten Fichtelmann and creative director Jan "Poki" Baumann (née Müller-Michaelis). Prior to founding Daedalic, Fichtelmann was marketing director for German publisher DTP Entertainment.

Shortly afterwards, the adventure game 1½ Knights – In Search of the Ravishing Princess Herzelinde was developed, named after the same film. On 28 August 2009, the adventure game The Whispered World followed and the adventure title A New Beginning, which focuses on climate change, was published on 8 October 2010. In 2011, the sequel to Edna & Harvey: The Breakout was released with the title Harvey’s New Eyes. A year later, a new adventure named Deponia was released to the market, which received several awards as well.

In May 2014, German publisher Bastei Lübbe acquired a majority share of 51% in Daedalic Entertainment. The following July, Daedalic opened a subsidiary studio, Daedalic Entertainment Studio West, in Düsseldorf.

In November 2016, Daedalic laid off twelve of its roughly 150 employees, primarily from the production and marketing departments, and opted not to renew several temporary contracts. In February 2018, Daedalic opened a third studio, this time in Munich under the name Daedalic Entertainment Bavaria. The new studio would consist of eight people, led by Oliver Machek, formerly of Klonk Games, as studio director and creative director, and by Stephan Harms, chief operating officer of Daedalic, as CEO. In August 2018, as Bastei Lübbe faced severe financial issues, the company started considering selling their 51% stake in Daedalic. In early 2021, the Düsseldorf and Munich studios entered liquidation; the former had been inactive since creative director Andreas Suika left in August 2019 for Epic Games, while the latter was emptied in late 2020 with all employees rehired by other Munich-based developers.

Nacon announced its intent to acquire Daedalic in February 2022 through purchase of all controlling shares of the company for an estimated $60 million. The acquisition was confirmed in April 2022.

In June 2023, Daedalic shuttered its development division, affecting 25 of its more than 90 employees. The closure came as a result of poor reception and performance of the studio's final internally developed game, The Lord of the Rings: Gollum. The report speaks of systemic problems in the German games industry. Responsible for Daedalic's decline was a changed dynamic after the studio was sold to various companies and lost its creative independence. With regard to the game Gollum, it was stated that Daedalic tried to develop an AAA title based on the American model with only a fraction of the staff. Only 85 employees developed Gollum, while other titles in the same class have around 200 employees.

== Games developed ==
| Year | Title | Platform(s) | Publisher(s) | Notes | Ref. |
|---|---|---|---|---|---|
| 2008 | Edna & Harvey: The Breakout | Windows, macOS, Linux, Nintendo Switch, PlayStation 4, Xbox One, Amazon Luna | Lace Mamba Global, Application Systems Heidelberg, Daedalic Entertainment | An improved anniversary edition was released in 2019 | |
| 2008 | 1½ Knights: In Search of the Ravishing Princess Herzelinde | Windows | Warner Bros. Interactive Entertainment | | |
| 2009 | The Whispered World | Windows, macOS, Linux, iOS | Deep Silver, Viva Media, Lace Mamba Global, Daedalic Entertainment | A special edition was released in 2014 | |
| 2009 | The Tudors | macOS, Windows | Merscom | | |
| 2010 | Wolfgang Hohlbein's The Inquisitor | Windows | Prime Games | | |
| 2010 | 20,000 Leagues Under the Sea | macOS, Windows | Prime Games | | |
| 2010 | Immortal Lovers | Windows | Prime Games | | |
| 2010 | The Chronicles of Shakespeare: Romeo & Juliet | macOS, Windows | Daedalic Entertainment | | |
| 2010 | A New Beginning | iOS, macOS, Windows | Daedalic Entertainment, Lace Mamba Global | A Final Cut version was released in 2012. | |
| 2011 | Edna & Harvey: Harvey's New Eyes | iOS, Linux, macOS, Windows, Nintendo Switch, PlayStation 4, Xbox One | Daedalic Entertainment | | |
| 2011 | The Chronicles of Shakespeare: A Midsummer Night's Dream | macOS, Windows | Daedalic Entertainment | | |
| 2011 | Borgia | macOS, Windows | Daedalic Entertainment | | |
| 2012 | Deponia | iOS, Linux, macOS, Windows, Nintendo Switch, PlayStation 4, Xbox One | Daedalic Entertainment, Lace Mamba Global | | |
| 2012 | The Dark Eye: Chains of Satinav | macOS, Windows, Nintendo Switch, PlayStation 4, Xbox One | Daedalic Entertainment, Deep Silver | | |
| 2012 | Chaos on Deponia | Linux, macOS, Windows, Nintendo Switch, PlayStation 4, Xbox One | Daedalic Entertainment | | |
| 2013 | The Night of the Rabbit | macOS, Windows, Nintendo Switch, Linux, PlayStation 4, PlayStation 5, Xbox One, Xbox Series X/S | Daedalic Entertainment | | |
| 2013 | The Dark Eye: Memoria | macOS, Windows, Nintendo Switch, PlayStation 4, Xbox One | Daedalic Entertainment | | |
| 2013 | Goodbye Deponia | Linux, macOS, Windows, Nintendo Switch, PlayStation 4, Xbox One | Daedalic Entertainment | | |
| 2014 | Blackguards | macOS, Windows | Daedalic Entertainment, Kalypso Media | | |
| 2014 | 1954 Alcatraz | Windows | Daedalic Entertainment | | |
| 2014 | Deponia: The Puzzle | Android, iOS, Windows | Daedalic Entertainment | | |
| 2014 | Edna & Harvey: The Puzzle | Android, iOS, Windows | Daedalic Entertainment | | |
| 2014 | Deponia: The Complete Journey | Linux, macOS, Windows | Daedalic Entertainment | | |
| 2015 | Blackguards 2 | macOS, Windows, PlayStation 4, Xbox One | Daedalic Entertainment | | |
| 2015 | Fire: Ungh’s Quest | Windows, macOS, Linux, Wii U, Nintendo Switch, iOS | Daedalic Entertainment | | |
| 2015 | Anna's Quest | Windows, macOS, Linux, Nintendo Switch, PlayStation 4, Xbox One | Daedalic Entertainment | | |
| 2016 | Deponia Doomsday | Windows, macOS, Linux, Nintendo Switch, PlayStation 4, Xbox One | Daedalic Entertainment | | |
| 2016 | Silence | Windows, macOS, Linux, Nintendo Switch, PlayStation 4, Xbox One | Daedalic Entertainment | | |
| 2017 | The Long Journey Home | macOS, Windows, Nintendo Switch, PlayStation 4, Xbox One | Daedalic Entertainment | Daedalic Entertainment Studio West | |
| 2017 | Ken Follett's The Pillars of the Earth | iOS, Linux, macOS, Windows, PlayStation 4, Xbox One | Daedalic Entertainment | Episodic game. Episode 3 released in 2018. | |
| 2018 | State of Mind | Windows, macOS, Linux, Nintendo Switch, PlayStation 4, Xbox One | Daedalic Entertainment | | |
| 2020 | A Year of Rain | Windows | Daedalic Entertainment | | |
| 2023 | The Lord of the Rings: Gollum | Nintendo Switch, PlayStation 4, PlayStation 5, Windows, Xbox One, Xbox Series X/S | Daedalic Entertainment, Nacon | Final internally developed game | |

=== Cancelled ===
- The Devil's Men
- Untitled The Lord of the Rings game

== Games published ==
| Year | Title | Platform(s) | Developer(s) | Notes | Ref. |
|---|---|---|---|---|---|
| 2013 | Journey of a Roach | Windows, macOS, Linux | Koboldgames | | |
| 2013 | Gomo | Windows, macOS | Fishcow Studio | | |
| 2014 | Munin | Windows, macOS, Linux | Gojira | | |
| 2014 | Randal's Monday | Windows, macOS | Nexus Game Studios | | |
| 2015 | Decay: The Mare | Windows, macOS, Linux | Shining Gate Software | | |
| 2015 | Dead Synchronicity: Tomorrow Comes Today | Android, iOS, Windows, macOS, Linux | Fictiorama Studios | | |
| 2015 | Holy Potatoes! A Weapon Shop?! | Windows, macOS, Linux | Daylight Studios | | |
| 2015 | Skyhill | Android, iOS, Windows, macOS, Linux, Nintendo Switch, PlayStation 4, Xbox One | Mandragora | | |
| 2015 | Valhalla Hills | iOS, Windows, macOS, Linux | Funatics Software | | |
| 2015 | ZanZarah: The Hidden Portal | Windows | Funatics Development (Funatics Software) | Re-release | |
| 2016 | Shooting Stars! | Windows, macOS, Linux | Bloodirony | | |
| 2016 | The Virus: Cry for Help | Android, iOS, watchOS | Popclaire | | |
| 2016 | Caravan | Windows, macOS, Linux | It Matters Games | | |
| 2016 | Crazy Machines 3 | Windows | Fakt Software | | |
| 2016 | Oh My Gore! | Windows | bumblebee. | | |
| 2016 | Candle | Windows, macOS, Linux, Nintendo Switch, PlayStation 4, Xbox One | Teku Studios | | |
| 2016 | Shadow Tactics: Blades of the Shogun | Windows, macOS, Linux, PlayStation 4, Xbox One | Mimimi Productions | | |
| 2017 | Holy Potatoes! We're in Space?! | Windows, macOS, Linux | Daylight Studios | | |
| 2017 | Shift Happens' | Windows, Nintendo Switch | Klonk Games | | |
| 2017 | Relaxing VR Games: Mahjong | Windows | CrazyBunch | | |
| 2017 | Leaves: The Journey | Windows, macOS | ZAR 21 | | |
| 2017 | Leaves: The Return | Windows, macOS | ZAR 21 | | |
| 2017 | The Franz Kafka Videogame | Windows, iOS, Android | Denis Galanin (mif2000) | | |
| 2017 | Bounty Train | Windows, macOS | Corbie Games | | |
| 2017 | Holy Potatoes! What the Hell?! | macOS, Linux, Nintendo Switch, PlayStation 4, Windows, Xbox One | Daylight Studios | | |
| 2017 | AER Memories of Old | macOS, Linux, Nintendo Switch, PlayStation 4, Windows, Xbox One | Forgotten Key | | |
| 2018 | Holy Potatoes! A Spy Story?! | Windows, macOS, Linux | Daylight Studios | | |
| 2019 | The Great Perhaps | macOS, Linux, Nintendo Switch, PlayStation 4, Windows, Xbox One | Caligari Games | | |
| 2019 | Intruders: Hide and Seek | Windows, PlayStation 4 | Tessera Studios | | |
| 2019 | Felix the Reaper | macOS, iOS, Nintendo Switch, PlayStation 4, Windows, Xbox One | Kong Orange | | |
| 2020 | The Suicide of Rachel Foster | Windows, PlayStation 4, Xbox One | One-O-One Games | | |
| 2020 | Iron Danger | Windows | Action Squad Studios | | |
| 2020 | Iratus: Lord of the Dead | Windows, macOS, Linux | Unfrozen | | |
| 2020 | Unrailed! | Windows, macOS, Linux, Nintendo Switch, PlayStation 4, Xbox One | Indoor Astronaut | Together with bilibili | |
| 2020 | Partisans 1941 | Windows | Alter Games | | |
| 2020 | Witch It | Windows | Barrel Roll Games | | |
| 2021 | Insurmountable | Windows, Nintendo Switch, PlayStation 4, PlayStation 5, Xbox One, Xbox Series X/S | ByteRockers' Games | | |
| 2021 | CryoFall | Windows | AtomicTorch Studio | | |
| 2021 | Glitchpunk | Windows | Dark Lord | | |
| 2021 | Fling to the Finish | Windows, macOS | SplitSide Games | | |
| 2021 | Jars | Windows, macOS, Linux | Mousetrap Games | | |
| 2021 | Shadow Tactics: Aiko's Choice | Windows, Linux | Mimimi Games | | |
| 2022 | Hidden Deep | Windows | Cogwheel Software | | |
| 2022 | Zombie Rollerz: Pinball Heroes | Windows | Zing Games Inc. | | |
| 2022 | VELONE | Windows, macOS | ZAR 21 | | |
| 2022 | Godlike Burger | Windows, macOS, Linux | Liquid Pug | | |
| 2022 | Warpips | Windows | Skirmish Mode Games | | |
| 2022 | Wildcat Gun Machine | Windows, Nintendo Switch, PlayStation 4, Xbox One | Chunkybox Games | | |
| 2022 | Destroyer: The U-Boat Hunter | Windows | Iron Wolf Studio S.A. | | |
| 2022 | The Heart of the Teddy Bear | Windows | Abenteuerpakete | | |
| 2023 | Children of Silentown | Windows | Elf Games, Luna2 Studio | | |
| 2023 | Inkulinati | Windows, Nintendo Switch, PlayStation 4, PlayStation 5, Xbox One, Xbox Series X/S | Yaza Games | | |
| 2023 | Potion Tycoon | Windows | Snowhound Games | | |
| 2023 | Life of Delta | Windows, macOS | Airo Games | | |
| 2023 | Barotrauma | Windows, macOS, Linux | FakeFish, Undertow Games | | |
| 2023 | Rough Justice: '84 | Windows | Gamma Minus UG | | |
| 2023 | Wanderful | Windows | Tiny Roar | | |
| 2023 | Wild Woods | Windows | Octofox Games | | |
| 2023 | REVEIL | Windows | Pixelsplit | | |
| 2023 | Magin: The Rat Project Stories | Windows | The Rat Project | | |
| 2023 | Capes | Windows | Spitfire Interactive | | |
| 2025 | Bloodgrounds | Windows | Exordium Games | Upcoming | |
| 2026 | Curse of the Crimson Stag | | | | |
| 2026 | Star Trek: Voyager – Across the Unknown | | | | |
| 2026 | Surviving Deponia | | | | |
| 2026 | Woodo | Windows, PlayStation 5, Xbox Series X|S, Nintendo Switch, Nintendo Switch 2 | Tiny Monks Tales | | |
