= Gomo (video game) =

2013 video game

- Developer: Fishcow Studio
- Publisher: Daedalic Entertainment
- Platforms: Windows; OS X
- Release: 6 December 2013
- Genre: Adventure game
- Mode: Single-player

Gomo is a video game developed by Slovak company Fishcow Studio. It is a Point-and-click adventure game.

== Gameplay ==
The game is a typical point-and-click adventure game with hand-drawn graphics. It also includes some puzzles to solve. The game is inspired by Amanita Design titles such as Machinarium. It also means that the story is told without words.

== Plot ==
The game follows Gomo whose dog Dingo is kidnapped by an alien. The alien demands a mystical red crystal artifact that is imbued with power.

== Reception ==
The game received middling reviews. It holds 50% on Metacritic. The game was criticised for its length, low difficulty, story and a low diversity of worlds. On the other hand, it was praised for its visuals.
