= The Whispered World =

2009 video game

- Developer: Daedalic Entertainment
- Publishers: EU: Deep Silver; NA: Viva Media; WW: Lace International; WW: Lace Mamba Global
- Designer: Marco Hüllen
- Composer: Hamburg's Periscope Studios
- Engine: Visionaire
- Platforms: Microsoft Windows; Mac OS; Linux; iOS
- Release: Windows: GER: August 28, 2009; EU: April 23, 2010; NA: April 26, 2010; OS X May 6, 2014 iOS; November 24, 2015; Linux; March 28, 2017
- Genre: Adventure
- Mode: Single-player

The Whispered World is a 2009 point-and-click adventure video game developed by Daedalic Entertainment and published by Deep Silver in Europe and by Viva Media in the United States. The game was released for Microsoft Windows, macOS, Linux and iOS. A special edition was released in 2014 and a sequel titled Silence was released in 2016. The four-act game takes place in a fantasy world and features a melancholy twelve-year-old clown as its hero. The graphics are 2D and are all hand-drawn and animated.

== Gameplay ==
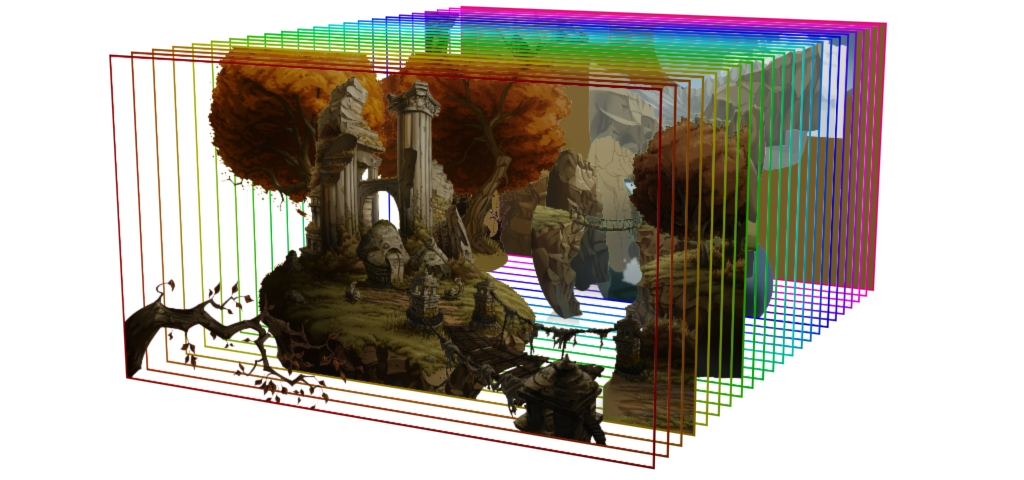
Parallax layer arrangement

The game is made using the Visionaire Studio engine. The game features a 2D scrolling viewport with parallax layers. The game is almost exclusively controlled by mouse. The player holds the left mouse button over objects or characters to bring up an interaction menu with "look", "talk", and "use" options. The player may hold the space bar to have the interactive portions of the world, such as objects, highlighted. This shows differently coloured indicators for objects, characters, and travel points.

Sadwick is accompanied by his pet caterpillar Spot who may perform certain actions. Spot can transform into several different forms useful for solving various puzzles. The forms are unlocked as the player progresses through the game. The game also features an inventory screen accessed by the right mouse button. Objects gathered from the world are stored in Sadwick's backpack. He may then use them in the world or combine them with other items.

== Plot ==
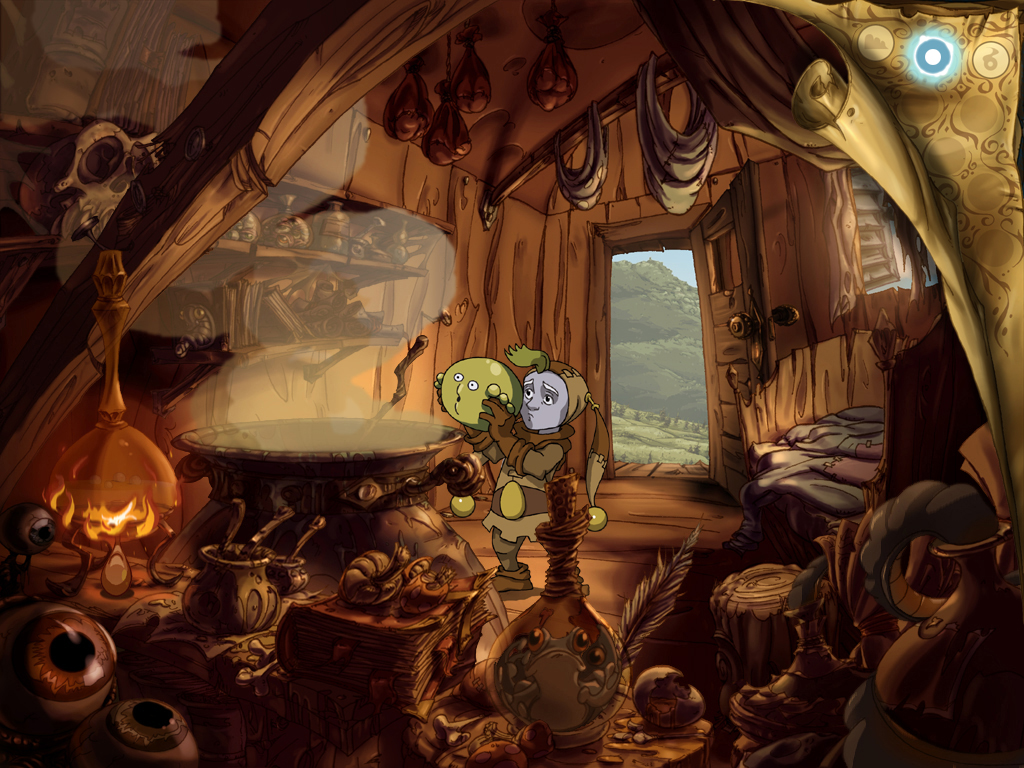
Screenshot

The game takes place in Silentia, a dream fantasy world, that is the home of a young, sad circus clown named Sadwick. The story starts as he wakes up in his travelling circus trailer after having experienced a recurring nightmare, where he sees the world falling apart.

Sadwick goes for a walk in a nearby forest and meets Bobby, a Chaski, messenger of the King. Bobby is heading to Corona, the royal castle, to deliver a powerful artefact, the Whispering Stone, to the king. He claims the end of the world is near and the land is already breaking apart and that the Asgil, a hideous horde of underground creatures, are surrounding Corona. He tells Sadwick that he has been unsuccessfully seeking out an oracle named Shana for advice on shortening his trip, and he asks Sadwick to help him find her. Sadwick believes that maybe she can interpret his nightmares, and he convinces Bobby to give him the Whispering Stone to help him find the oracle. Shortly after Bobby gets scared away and disappears in what Sadwick believes was an Asgil attack. Sadwick finds a secret passage that, when activated by the Whispering Stone, leads him to Shana, and finds out from her that his destiny is to destroy the world.

Shana directs Sadwick to a nearby island to find mysterious Kalida who eventually takes him near Corona. There Sadwick comes across the Asgil hideout and manages to listen in to the plans of Asgil leader Loucaux but gets captured and thrown in a jail cell. After successfully escaping, he manages to board a flying steam locomotive to Corona, where he meets Bobby again who tells Sadwick that he is too late and the king has locked himself in his quarters. Exploring the castle, Sadwick finds a model of a planetary system linked to the flow of space-and-time itself. He meets the royal astronomer who tells him the Whispering Stone represents the planet Silentia in the model of 5 planets and the king must repair the system to restore the balance, but he has fallen ill, and only when the system is repaired can it activate the fountain of the Water of Life that can wake the king.

Upon repairing the mechanism himself, a blue sphere from Sadwick's nightmares appears saying that Sadwick is inevitably ending the world. Trying to prevent that, Sadwick jams the planetary system's mechanism stopping time itself and breaking all of the world into pieces. The Asgil occupy what is left of the castle, but Sadwick manages to trick Loucaux and reactivates the planetary mechanism again, restoring the cadence of time. He escapes and arrives at the king's quarters to wake him, in which he instead finds some familiar settings and a large mirror. Upon looking into the mirror, a boy in a hospital gown drags him through it into a black, empty room, with the mirror he was pulled through, and a mirror opposite it. Looking into the other mirror, Sadwick sees the boy in a hospital bed with his eyes closed, while a man reads a book next to him. The boy explains that in reality Sadwick is this boy lying in a coma while the blue sphere is the man, who is his father, reading him stories. Sadwick then breaks the mirror he came from and wakes up in the real world.

== Development ==
The game's development began in 2004 as Marco Hüllen's diploma work for Rhein-Sieg Academy of Realistic Visual Arts and Design (German: Rhein-Sieg-Akademie für Realistische Bildende Kunst und Design). He was then hired by now defunct Bad Brain Entertainment and a demo was released in 2005. Bad Brain Entertainment went out of business in 2006 and the game was discontinued and offered to the community to continue as (and only as) a freeware adventure. However, in 2007, the relatively new Daedalic Entertainment acquired the rights to the project and re-hired Marco Hüllen and the game was subsequently finished and released in 2009.

== Reception ==
Reception

Aggregate score
Aggregator	Score
Metacritic	(PC) 70/100 (iOS) 65/100

Review scores
Publication	Score
4Players	(PC) 84%
Adventure Gamers	(PC) 4/5
The A.V. Club	(PC) B+
Destructoid	(PC) 7.5/10
Edge	(PC) 6/10
Eurogamer	(PC) 6/10
GameSpot	(PC) 5.5/10
GameZone	(PC) 6/10
PC Gamer (UK)	(PC) 70%
RPGFan	(PC) 84%
The Telegraph	(PC) 7/10
TouchArcade	(iOS) 3.5/5
Teletext GameCentral	(PC) 5/10

Award
Publication	Award
German Game Developer Award 2009	"Best German Game of the Year" and "Best Story"

The game received "mixed or average reviews" on both platforms according to the review aggregation website Metacritic. Overall, the reviews gave the PC version above-average scores, criticizing puzzle design and voice acting, yet praising hand-drawn artwork and emotional story.

Brett Todd of GameSpot deemed the PC version as average. He praised it for "gorgeous [..]" and "beautiful painted scenery and cartoon characters", "dreamlike storyline", and "some good, logical brainteasers." However, he criticized it for "erratic voice acting, including a whiney, nasally protagonist." Although acknowledging "detailed script", he criticized "excessive dialogue" and pointed out that "some of the charm of this dreamy fairytale is lost because there is too much dialogue." He also noted that "[..] many puzzles [..] defy logic" and "common sense is trampled on much of the time." John Walker of Eurogamer praised the game as "absolutely beautiful" with a remarkable, enormous world. He also noted the "splendid writing" and that "jokes are often fantastic, Sadwick's remarks inventively downbeat." However, he criticised the delivery and the "excruciating" voice acting. He also noted "annoying [..] impossibly random moments" with illogical puzzle solutions and often having "no idea what you should be doing next." Nathaniel Berens of Adventure Gamers praised the "quality of the visual presentation" with "absolutely stunning hand-drawn artwork" and "excellent soundtrack", as well as "charming" and "emotional" story, and Sadwick and Spot as a "uniquely likeable pair". He also noted that "puzzles are generally quite clever", but criticized that "a couple of puzzles make no sense until after you've figured them out by accident". He also noted awkward humour and Sadwick's voice. He mentioned that The Whispered World is "polished, well-realized adventure in the classic tradition".

According to the Kölner Stadt-Anzeiger, the PC version sold above 50,000 units worldwide by August 2010. The paper considered this figure to be a success.

=== Awards ===
During the German Game Developer Award 2009, The Whispered World received six nominations, more than any other title. The game was nominated in "Best German Game of the Year", "Best Game Design," "Best Graphics," "Best Youth Game," "Best Story," and "Best Soundtrack" categories. The game won "Best German Game of the Year" and "Best Story" titles.

== Sequel ==
In early 2014, Daedalic Entertainment announced a sequel, titled Silence: The Whispered World 2. Initially slated to be released in late 2014, it was given a release time in late 2016. Taking place some time after the first game, it stars Noah, the young boy who was awoken from a coma at the end of the original game. Now a teenager, he must return to his dream world to search for his younger sister, who was separated from him during a bombing raid on their hometown.Silence was released on November 15, 2016.

== See also ==
- Ankh: Battle of the Gods
- House of Tales
- Runaway: A Twist of Fate
