= GameStar =

German PC game magazine

- Editor-in-chief: Heiko Klinge
- Former editors: Jochen Gebauer; Michael Trier; Gunnar Lott; Jörg Langer
- Circulation: 63,189 (01/2015)
- Publisher: Webedia
- Founder: Jörg Langer
- Founded: September 1997
- Country: Germany
- Language: German, English (US division)
- Website: gamestar.de gamestar.com
- OCLC: 315108087

GameStar is a monthly-released PC gaming magazine in Germany. It is the best-selling German-language magazine focused on PC gaming and it also hosts the largest video gaming-related portal in the German-speaking internet.

GameStar.de is the largest PC gaming web portal in the German-speaking internet and one of the largest web portals in the entirety of the German-speaking internet. Until April 2026, the magazine also came with a DVD, which featured Demos, Mods, video-reviews as well as a full retail version of a videogame. Since then, the DVD is gone, video-reviews are provided via Website, and the full versions are provided by individual keys included in the magazine.

== Content ==
GameStar has been published in various versions with different features. This includes the magazine version (which does not include any DVDs and is thus cheaper), a "normal" edition, which includes one DVD, and a XL Version, which contains 2 DVDs. The magazine for subscribers has less advertisement and shows a larger front-page picture. Until mid-2005 a CD-only version was also available, but it was decided that DVD-readers in Computers had become widespread enough, and so the CD-version was deemed unnecessary. Instead the XL version appeared for the first time.

GameStar also hosts a large internet forum, the GSPB (GameStar Pinboard). It is one of largest internet forums in the German-speaking internet.

== History and editorship ==
GameStar was founded by Charles Glimm, Jörg Langer und Toni Schwaiger with the IDG Entertainment Media GmbH as publisher and debuted in September 1997, with Jörg Langer as editor-in-chief.

The new magazine soon gained a lot of popularity. By the fourth quarter of 1999 it sold about 333,000 issues per month, in 2000 it overtook competitor PC Games as the largest German language videogames magazine in Europe.

IDG also started GameStar sister magazines in Italy, Poland, Hungary, the Czech Republic and the United States. The US version was, quite differently from the rest, positioned as a magazine for adults, about PC and console games, similar to inCite. However they all folded after a few months due to disappointing sales. The only long term launch was achieved in Hungary. In 2005, GameStar spawned a sister magazine called /GameStar/dev which is targeted at European Game Developers. GameStar also has a sister magazine named GamePro, which focuses on console games. Incidentally its headquarters are right next-door to the GameStar office.

In April 2015 GameStar and its sister magazine GamePro were sold by IDG to the French publisher Webedia.

Jörg Langer was succeeded by Gunnar Lott as editor-in-chief, followed by Michael Trier on 1 December 2007. As of June 2016, editor-in-Chief is Heiko Klinge.

GameStar also held a popular known E-Sports-League, the GameStar Clanliga, featuring games such a Warcraft III, Counter-Strike as well as Tactical Ops.

== Sales and popularity ==
After it launched, GameStar was able to steadily gain in popularity. By the fourth quarter of 1999, it had sold about 331.535 issues per month and in 2000 it overtook its competitor PC Games as the largest German-language PC game magazine in Europe. Since then, GameStar has kept the spot as the best-selling German-language PC gaming-focused magazine in Europe.

Like the whole print market, GameStar was affected by diminishing sales. In 2008, the average monthly circulation was 250,000 copies, but by January 2015 sold issues per month had dropped to 63,189. Despite the drop, GameStar remains the highest-selling German -language PC gaming-focused magazine in Europe.
