= PC Games =

German PC game magazine

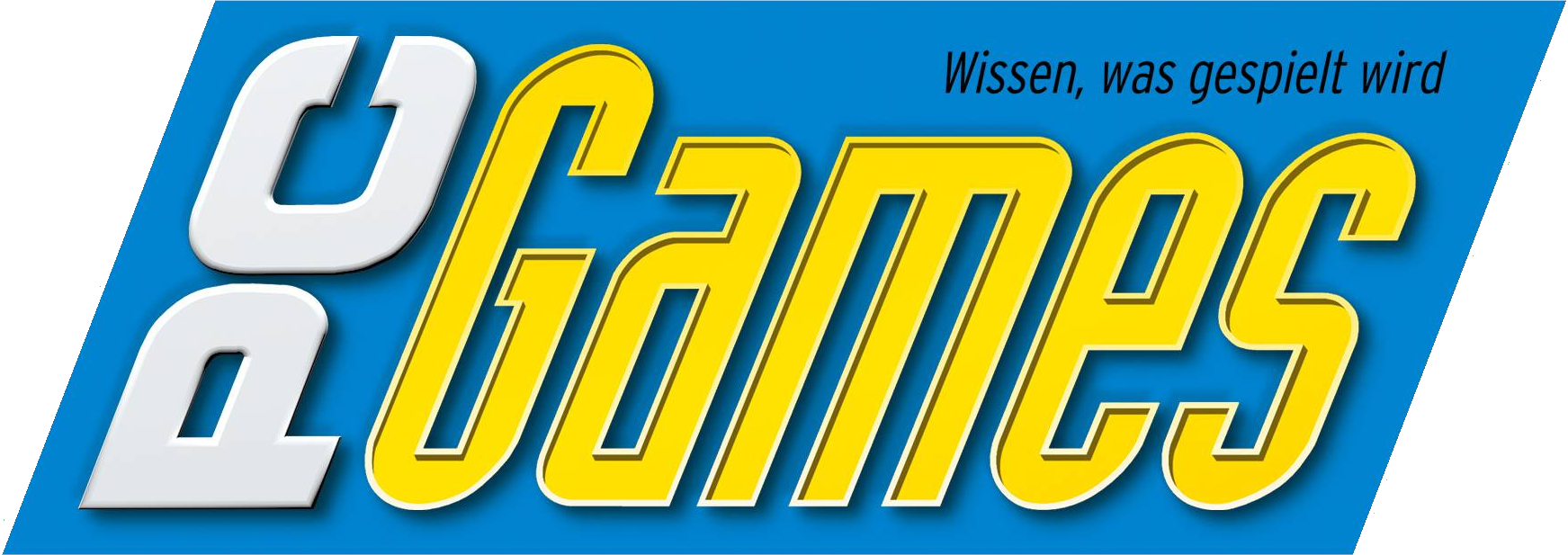
- Publisher: Computec Media GmbH
- Founder: Oliver Menne and Thomas Borovskis
- First issue: 1 October 1992
- Country: Germany
- Based in: Fürth
- Website: pcgames.de
- ISSN: 0946-6304

PC Games is a monthly-released PC gaming magazine published by the Computec Media GmbH in Germany.

== History ==
PC Games was founded in 1992 and included a 3½-in floppy disk, which was changed to a CD-ROM in 1995. By 1999 it became the leading computer gaming magazine in Germany at this time.

From October 1992 to March 1998, the founders Oliver Menne and Thomas Borovskis were editors-in-chief. They were replaced by Thomas Borovskis from April 1998 to February 2000. From March 2000 to June 2001, the magazine was led by Florian Stangl and Petra Fröhlich. From March 2004 on, Petra Fröhlich was the sole editor-in-chief. Fröhlich left this post in December 2014 and was replaced by Wolfgang Fischer.

== Content ==
The magazine has about 116 pages (extended edition), and also usually includes a DVD (earlier a CD) with drivers, demos, mods and maps. The DVD also often includes a full retail version of a chosen game.

The magazine contains the following content:

- News about the PC gaming community
- Previews of computer games, (games which are still in development)
- Sneak Peeks by invited readers on upcoming games
- Tests (reviews) of lately released or to be released computer games
- A section about freeware and open-source games, mods and e-sports
- Articles about recent PC hardware components with regard to computer gaming (e.g. joysticks or computer mouses)
- Articles about important events, that influence the gaming community at large (i.e. e-sports, censorship)
- Hints, cheats, modifications and walkthroughs for released games
- A magazine part with letters to the editors and other topics concerning the magazine and its editors itself

== Versions ==
PC Games was released in several different versions:

- A "magazine" version (which does not include any DVDs and is thus cheaper)
- PC Games Extended with two DVDs and 16 additional pages
- PC Games MMORE which features content related to MMOGs and mostly World of Warcraft.

Discontinued editions:

- A "normal" edition, with one DVD in a rated 16 or rated 18 edition
- PC Games Premium with more content centering around a specific game brand with extra merchandise

The publishing company also publishes a magazine called PC Games Hardware, which solely concentrates on the testing of gaming-related hardware devices.

== Sales and popularity ==
The magazine is one of the best-selling computer gaming magazines in Germany, after Computerbild Spiele and Gamestar. In the fourth quarter of 1999, PC Games sold 363,608 issues per month, making it the best-selling PC gaming magazine in Germany at the time. However, from 2002 on, the print market started to decline and PC Games's sale figures decreased. By the fourth quarter of 2011, only 102,032 copies per month were sold.

PC Games also hosts a gaming portal in the internet on PCGames.de, where they provide coverage and publish news, reviews and tests for computer games and computer gaming related topics. As of February 2016, PCGames.de has about 1.41 million unique visitors per month, making it one of the largest PC gaming web portals in the German-language internet.
