= List of Consolevania episodes =

Consolevania is a Scottish internet television with a magazine format, dedicated to video game reviews, gaming features, and comedy sketches based on gaming culture. The show's format was adapted for mainstream television as the BBC Scotland show videoGaiden, featuring the same creative team, while episodes of Consolevania continued to be produced and distributed online as time permitted.

== History ==
The show began production in early 2004, and episodes were initially distributed for free on CD in the post to interested members of the RLLMUK discussion forum, before being made available as torrents and then as HTTP downloads from the show's website and mirror sites. The first two episodes of Series One were released in March and April 2004, with the rest of the series being released between August 2004 and April 2005.

The first and second episodes of Series Two appeared in July and August 2005, following which the show was put on hiatus, while the creative team worked on the first series of videoGaiden. Episodes 3–7 were released at monthly intervals between March and July 2006. A second hiatus followed, during which the second series of videoGaiden was made and broadcast, and the eighth and final episode of Series Two was finally released in February 2007.

Series Three began in the summer of 2007, and four episodes (as well as a lost episode) were released between June and October 2007. Production of Consolevania then halted again for the third series of videoGaiden (December 2007–March 2008). In late 2008, the show's creators experimented with a new distribution method, making new reviews and sketches available on the show's YouTube account before releasing compilations of these items as episodes in the usual manner. However, this proved to be a short-lived experiment: equipment problems and the creative team's growing disenchantment led to the end of the original run of Consolevania in January 2009.

After an eight-year hiatus, and following the release of a fourth series of videoGaiden in 2016, a new series of Consolevania, based on a subscription model, was announced at the beginning of 2017. New episodes have been made available to the show's Patreon subscribers on a monthly basis, from February 2017 onwards. Series Four concluded in November 2017 and was followed by a Christmas special. Series Five began in January 2018, and Series Six (a shorter series of themed episodes) in January 2019. Following a trailed change to the series format, Series Seven began in August 2019. Series Eight, the longest to date (24 episodes), started just before the COVID-19 pandemic imposed further changes such as the livestreaming of episodes on Twitch. Following an announcement on 19 February 2022 that the creators were relinquishing their rights to the show and its format, the ninth series began in February 2022.

24 episodes (one of which is currently missing) were produced during the show's original 2004–09 run, while 81 episodes have been produced so far for the second run (2017- ), making a current total of 105.

== Series overview ==
Series	Episodes	Originally released	
Series	Episodes	First released	Last released
1	8	10 March 2004	20 April 2005
2	8	1 July 2005	19 February 2007
3	8	30 June 2007	16 January 2009
4	11	18 February 2017	26 December 2017
5	12	31 January 2018	31 December 2018
6	7	31 January 2019	31 July 2019
7	6	31 August 2019	31 January 2020
8	24	29 February 2020	31 January 2022
9	21	28 February 2022	TBA

== Episodes ==
=== Series 1 (2004–05) ===
No. overall	No. in series	Title	Original release date	Running time
1	1	"Episode One (Episode 1.1)"	10 March 2004	55'43"
Reviews: Castlevania: Lament of Innocence (PS2) (Rab), Morrowind (Xbox) (Ryan), Siren (PS2) (Rab), Bujingai (PS2) (Rab). Sketches: The Shenmue drinking game, Legend (several segments), The Passion of the Chris, Consolevania Babe of the Month-hole: Lara Croft, The Consolevania Interview: Damien Murray of G-Force Glasgow, Consolevania Wrestling Federation, Hitler: the interview, OverBlood. Notes: Introduction of the show's reviewers and lead performers, Robert Florence and Ryan Macleod, and of regular supporting performer Michael S. Hoffs. First appearances of Legend (played by Florence) and Hitler (played by Hoffs). Kenny Swanston (see episode 1.3) appears incognito as a Japanese wrestler in the CWF segment. First reference to OverBlood. Damien Murray would later make several appearances in videoGaiden series 3.
2	2	"Episode Two (Episode 1.2)"	12 April 2004	48'54"
Reviews: Glass Rose (PS2) (Rab), Kya (PS2) (Ryan), Biohazard Outbreak (PS2) (Rab), Romance Of The Three Kingdoms VIII (PS2) (Rab), .hack//INFECTION (PS2) (Ryan). Sketches: Zombies in Glasgow (two segments), Legend (several segments), Cosplay the Consolevania Way: #1 Virtuoso (from the eponymous 3DO game), Hitler complains to GAME, Cosplay the Consolevania Way: #2 Gundam, A Day In The Life, Consolevania Jailbait of the Month-hole: Tooty, Videogaming 50,000 BC, Cosplay the Consolevania Way: #3 Raz Karcy, Kenny: He Is Coming.
3	3	"Episode Three (Episode 1.3)"	5 August 2004	45'54"
Reviews: Syberia II (Xbox) (Rab), Driv3r (Xbox) (Ryan), Showdown: Legends of Wrestling (Xbox) (Rab), Full Spectrum Warrior (Xbox) (Ryan), Spider-Man 2 (Rab). Sketches: Kenny: he'll show you how it's fucking done (various segments), Violence in Videogames: Rab discusses Manhunt on daytime TV (and says "bummed in the gob"), Jet Set Radio Future: tagging in Glasgow, Hitler: update from the front, Tap Tap Tap (climbing), Nigel Mansell CV advert, End of Level Boss and Mid-Level Sub-Boss: dinner, John Gacy's Kiddies Corner. Notes: First full appearance of Kenny Swanston. First high-pitched scream from Ryan. First appearance of El Zomba and John Gacy (both played by Florence), and of End of Level Boss and Mid-Level Sub-Boss (played by Florence and Macleod, respectively). The Violence in Videogames segment uses footage from the 29 July 2004 edition of BBC One Scotland's news programme Reporting Scotland, on which Florence appeared as a panellist. 'Bummed in the Gob', a RLLMUK meme which Florence quoted for a dare, subsequently appeared as an addiction level in the player statistics for Grand Theft Auto IV.
4	4	"Type Four (Episode 1.4)"	4 September 2004	51'17"
Reviews: Winning Eleven 8 (PS2) (Rab), Gradius V (PS2) (Rab), The Chronicles of Riddick: Escape from Butcher Bay (Xbox) (Ryan), Michigan (PS2) (Rab). Gaming: The ~~Ten~~ Eleven Best N64 Games Ever with Rab (Super Mario 64, Ocarina of Time, GoldenEye, Diddy Kong Racing, Pilotwings 64, F-Zero X, Conker's Bad Fur Day, Mystical Ninja 64, Virtual Pro Wrestling 2, Bangai-O, Sin and Punishment). Sketches: Peter Molyneux (Hoffs): excited by boredom, Legend (multiple segments), If game characters were like gamers, Sammy Miller: hazards in the gaming area, Tap Tap Tap (wrestling), Kenny shows you how to be Goro, John Gacy's Kiddies Corner, Shigsy previews Consolevania 5 with Louise. Notes: First appearances of supporting performers Joanne Daly and Louise Stewart, and of the characters Sammy Miller (played by Macleod) and Shigsy (operated and voiced by Florence).
5	5	"The Musical (Episode 1.5)"	23 December 2004	53'02"
Reviews: Halo 2 (Xbox) (Ryan), Cabela's Deer Hunt: 2005 Season (Xbox) (Rab), Tales of Symphonia (GameCube) (Ryan), Grand Theft Auto: San Andreas (PS2) (Rab). Gaming: The 19 Best Top 10 SNES games [sic] with Rab (Sim City, Super Mario World, Super Metroid, Star Fox, Contra III, Clock Tower, Chrono Trigger, Final Fantasy VI, Super Fire Pro Wrestling X Premium, Super Mario Kart, Link to the Past, Street Fighter II, Yoshi's Island, F-Zero, Super Tennis). Sketches: Legend (rap), Decision Commander (two segments), Mario Paint feat. a weeping willy, The Deer Hunter with light guns (intro to Cabela's Deer Hunt), CV Top Gear, Competition time: whose fault is it not?, A Very Special Guest: Dominik Diamond (Macleod), Tap Tap Tap (DDR), Hitler: home video, emergency announcement from Sammy Miller regarding GTA: San Andreas, The Shigsy Show: Let's Say Nintendo's Doomed! (parody of Let's Call the Whole Thing Off), John Gacy's Kiddies Corner: SingStar, Consolevania Storytime (feat. 'MegaFag', a ROM hack of Mega Man 6), the musical finale with Kenny (You're the Best! Around!).
6	6	"The Christmas Special (Episode 1.6)"	24 December 2004	25'10"
Gaming: Consolevania Game Awards 2004 — Overachievement of the Year: Fable, Outstanding Contribution to 'Fun': OutRun 2, Adolf Hitler's Game of the Century: Rolling Ronny (Amiga), Most Excellent Gameworld Architecture: Castle Excellent, Reviewer's Choice 2004 (Mr. Ryan): Morrowind, The 'If Only It Were Real Life' Award: Kung-Fu Master, Look-A-Like of the Year: Ryan as Bad Street Brawler, Reviewer's Choice 2004 (Mr. Robert): Romance of the Three Kingdoms VIII, Best Use of Colour: Colorful Dragon, Utter Fucking Shite of the Year: Driv3r, Game most akin...: Burnout 3, Best Performance in a Video Game: Dogs Bower (from Blue Stinger), Consolevania Game of the Year: GTA San Andreas. Sketches: A Word from our Christmas Sponsor: Jesus (Hoffs) gives a Halo 2 masterclass, A Christmas Gift for the Ladies ('Eddie Murphy' in Miss & Mister World '96 Nude), John Gacy's Kiddies Corner (Gacy as Santa), It's Hitler's Wonderful Life (feat. Patrick Moore (Florence)), Shaq's emotional Christmas, Kenny's Christmas Present.
7	7	"The Resident Evil Special (Episode 1.7)"	19 February 2005	28'39"
Reviews: OverBlood (PS1) (Ryan), Resident Evil 4 (Nintendo GameCube) (Rab). Gaming: Resident Evil: Tumblers (Rab discusses 'tumblers', set-piece moments which mesh perfectly with game design). Sketches: Hitler's plan, Ryan's got a girlfriend, Consolevania News with The Amazing Criswell (previews of Demento and Cold Fear, intercut with footage from Orgy of the Dead), the creation of El Zomba, Tap Tap Tap (escaping from Hitler), Kenny the hedge-trimmer and Rab's death, El Zomba kills Ryan, Behind the Scenes: Corpse Killer 3DO, Hitler's triumph, Criswell's farewell, John Gacy's Kiddies Corner (out in the woods). Notes: This episode is dedicated to Japanese game producer Shinya Nishigaki of Crazy Games / Climax Graphics, creator of Blue Stinger and Illbleed (both later reviewed in episode 2.8), who died in February 2004.
8	8	"Consolevania Retro / The Retro Special (Episode 1.8)"	20 April 2005	35'37"
Reviews: Castle of Terror (Rab), Speedball 2 (Ryan). Gaming: Ryan looks back on the ZX Spectrum (Alchemist, Lunar Jetman, Penetrator, Harrier Attack, Equinox, Paperboy, Manic Miner, Knight Lore, Renegade, Chuckie Egg), Commodore 64 days with Rab (Bruce Lee, Cauldron II, Commando, Friday the 13th, High Noon, Law of the West, Mad Doctor, Master of Magic, Spy vs. Spy, World Games, Monty on the Run). Sketches: Rab and Ryan travel through time (several segments), Jim'll Fix It for Ryan, Welcome to Zoo Keeper (three segments), Shigsy in 2007, Consolevania News with Mike Read and Noel Edmonds (previews of Fire Emblem: Path of Radiance, WrestleMania 21, Killer7), Rab and Ryan confront Hitler (parodying Davros) (two segments), 1980s NES adverts (WWF WrestleMania, Ironsword, Legend of Zelda), Legend, The Future of Handheld Gaming (weeping willy on PictoChat), End of Level Boss and Mid-Level Sub-Boss: game, Rab and Ryan confront the Master (a.k.a. Kenny).

=== Series 2 (2005–07) ===
No. overall	No. in series	Title	Original release date	Running time
9	1	"Episode 2.1"	1 July 2005	35'11"
Reviews: Batman Begins (Xbox) (Rab), Conker: Live & Reloaded (Xbox) (Ryan), 7 Sins (PS2) (Ryan), Battlefield 2 (PC) (Rab). Sketches: Reggie introduces series 2 and Legend (intro), Legend (several segments), the Metal Gear Solid 3: Snake Eater intro redubbed into Lylatian, Reggie and Shigsy at Nintendo E3, Manpuncher versus Boxhead, Consolevania News: Live from Tokyo with Hatoki (feat. adverts for Nonono Puzzle Chairian, Famicom Wars DS, and Kirby Canvas Curse), Hitler's Art Attack, CV MILF search 2005: Star Ocean 3, Courtney's Another Code review and the release of John Gacy. Notes: Final appearance of Shigsy. Final appearance of Legend in Consolevania; the character was retired completely following the end of videoGaiden series 1 in December 2005. Battlefield 2 was the first PC game reviewed on Consolevania.
10	2	"Episode 2.2"	19 August 2005	32'27"
Reviews: Leisure Suit Larry: Magna Cum Laude (Xbox) (Rab), Sid Meier's Pirates! (Xbox) (Ryan), Guild Wars (PC) (Rab), OverBlood 2 (PS) (Ryan). Sketches: Consolevania Dance Off with Richard Wilson, Hitler: Pimp My Console, Robert's Impersonation Spot, Consolevania Tips: Bomberman Jetters (featuring Osama bin Laden), Consolevania News (a re-edit of Perversion for Profit featuring promotional video from Rumble Roses XX and Tomb Raider Legend), Ryan interviews J Allard, Rab the DJ, Kevin Leddins: Nu-Skool Journalist (parody of New Games Journalism). Notes: Final appearance of Michael S. Hoffs. Final Hitler sketch. First appearance of Kevin Leddins (played by Florence).
11	3	"Episode 2.3"	12 March 2006	29'24"
Reviews: Marc Ecko's Getting Up: Contents Under Pressure (PS2) (Ryan), Dragon Quest VIII: Journey of the Cursed King (PS2) (Rab), Shadow of the Colossus (PS2) (Ryan), Trapt (PS2) (Rab). Gaming: Consolevania News with Jessica Fletcher (Stranglehold, Mortal Kombat: Armageddon, Shadow Hearts II). Sketches: QuizVania (Quizmania parody, several segments), Consolevania Special Report (investigation into false advertising in Virgin Megastores), Rockstar Presents Table Tenni$, Michael Jackson's Moonwalker, Dangers of the Nintendo DS, The Art of the Square-Go: TEAM call out Codemasters. Notes: First reference to the Consolevania creators as 'TEAM'.
12	4	"Consolevania XXX (Episode 2.4)"	8 April 2006	29'38"
Reviews: Lula 3D (Rab), Final Fight: Streetwise (PS2) (Ryan), New Fantasia (Coin-Op) (Ryan), ThriXXX Technology Games: 3D Sex Villa & Hentai 2 3D (PC) (Rab). Gaming: Consolevania News Africa (previews of Rumble Roses XX, Rogue Trooper, and Paradise). Sketches: Rab and Ryan at the Night Trap party (several segments), gamedatetv (two segments), Smashing Drive with Tony Yayo, Reggie Fils-Aimé on J Allard, Psychic Detective, Alicia Rhodes & Pornstars' Game Addiction, TEAM: So Who's Next? Notes: First reference to 'Consolevania Towers' (see episode 3.1).
13	5	"Episode 2.5"	8 May 2006	30'45"
Reviews: Makai Kingdom: Chronicles of the Sacred Tome (PS2) (Ryan), The Elder Scrolls IV: Oblivion (Xbox 360) (Rab), Far Cry Instincts: Predator (Xbox 360) (Ryan), Dreamfall: The Longest Journey (Xbox) (Rab). Gaming: Koei Spotlight with Rab (Dynasty Tactics, Dynasty Warriors, G1 Jockey 4, Gitaroo Man). Sketches: Phoenix Wright defends O. J. Simpson, John Gacy's Kiddies Corner: Top Ten Kids' Games of All Time, Real Life Marble Madness, Hatris: Get it on!, End of Level Boss and Mid-Level Sub-Boss: E3 tickets, Reggie Fils-Aimé & J Allard: love comes looking for you / Purple Rain (filmed by Ken Kutaragi). Notes: After this episode, John Gacy does not appear until the 2017 Christmas special.
14	6	"Episode 2.6"	13 June 2006	31'25"
Reviews: Sensible Soccer 2006 (Xbox) (Ryan), World Poker Tour (PS2) & Stacked (Xbox) (Rab), Urban Chaos: Riot Response (Ryan), Hitman: Blood Money (Xbox 360) (Rab). Sketches: DS at E3: OverBlood (two segments), Ask Kenny, 2006 FIFA World Cup: Serbia vs. Holland (with commentary from International Super Star Soccer 98's announcer), TEAM!: calling out Rare, Michael McDonald's music for Halo 3, Louie "The Light" Gunn: Videogame Standup, Peter Moore announcing OverBlood 3, Sammy Miller (intro to Hitman), Manpuncher versus Boxhead 2.
15	7	"Independents Day (Episode 2.7)"	12 July 2006	31'18"
Reviews: Naked War (PC) (Ryan), Galactic Civilizations 2 (PC) (Rab), The Ship (PC) (Ryan). Gaming: Indie Round-Up with Rab (Bullet Candy, Narbacular Drop, Nero, Tremulous, Break Quest, New Star Soccer 3). Sketches: Rab and Ryan in the forest, Ask Kenny, Finding the Coathanger Mic (three segments), The Consolevania Story (interviews with Rab, Ryan, and director Brian Blessed), Kevin Leddins: NSJ Picketing. Notes: This episode is the first in the show's loose ongoing storyline. It is dedicated to climber, broadcaster, and fellow Glaswegian Tom Weir, who died while it was in production.
16	8	"Dreamcasts from Another World (Episode 2.8, also known as Episode 2.LATE)"	19 February 2007	33'11"
Reviews: L.O.L.: Lack of Love (Rab), Blue Stinger (Ryan), Maken X (Ryan), Illbleed (Rab). Gaming: Father Segato: Ten Steps to Segasm with Rab (Street Fighter III, Shenmue, Tony Hawk 2, Armada, Virtual-On Oratorio Tangram, San Francisco Rush 2049, Giant Gram 2000, Fire Pro Wrestling D, Culdcept). Sketches: The Alternate Dreamcast Universe, Rab on Lovematch (intro to L.O.L.), Things we used to do in our universe: Uno on Xbox Live Vision (two segments), Rab and Ryan pitch Consolevania to the Dragons of the Dreamcast Universe Dragons' Den, Kenny's arrival. Notes: A retrospective of Dreamcast games. Originally intended for release in August 2006, this episode was finally released six months later.

=== Series 3 (2007–09) ===
No. overall	No. in series	Title	Original release date	Running time
17	1	"Consolevania Towers (Episode 3.1)"	30 June 2007	36'11"
Reviews: Sherlock Holmes: The Awakened (PC) (Rab), Rogue Galaxy (PS2) (Ryan), Overlord (360) (Ryan). Gaming: PS3 Round-Up with Rab, part 1 (Audio Visualizer, Tekken 5: Dark Resurrection, Super Stardust HD, MotorStorm, Gran Turismo HD, Genji: Days of the Blade, Alien: Resurrection (PS1)), Emilo Zerg & Dave's Review Round-Up (Colin McRae: DiRT, Earth Defense Force 2017 (360), Command & Conquer 3 (PC)), PS3 Round-Up with Rab, part 2 (Resistance: Fall of Man, Nucleus, Calling All Cars!, Ridge Racer 7). Sketches: The Boys move into Consolevania Towers, Max the Computer (intro to Sherlock Holmes), Ken Kutaragi on the road (The Littlest Hobo), Meeting Ziggy Springsteen, Edith and Rosemary's Frightful Memories: Mad Panic Coaster, Rab and Ryan ask Max about Kenny, Victor Douglas Ramshorn III's Video Diary: Dead or Alive Xtreme, Kenny's return. Notes: First appearance of Max the Tower computer, and of Ziggy Springsteen (played by Allan Miller).
18	2	"You Are Desirable (Episode 3.2)"	1 August 2007	41'30"
Reviews: Big Brain Academy (Wii) (Ryan), Armored Core 4 (360) (Rab), Torrente 3: The Protector (PS2) (Ryan), G1 Jockey (Wii) (Rab), The Darkness (360) (Ryan), Global Defence Force Tactics (PS2) (Rab). Gaming: MC Meatshield Micro and Bullet Time's Review Round-Up (FlatOut: Ultimate Carnage, Ouendan 2, Ninja Gaiden Sigma). Sketches: Kenny's invitation to Meux's party, TEAM reunited, Woglinde Street episode 7: Trousers, TEAM at E3 2007, Edith and Rosemary's Frightful Memories: Escape from Monster Manor, CV's Hideo Kojima interview interrupted by Ziggy Springsteen: You Are Desirable, Rab has a chug (intro to GDF Tactics), Bonus Feature: Halo 3 Live Action Film. Notes: Richard Rankin's sole appearance. Final appearance of Louise Stewart in Consolevania.
19	3	"Unnamed Episode (cat no: 25677-3) (Episode 3.3, a.k.a. The Black Episode)"	9 September 2007	27'00"
Reviews: BioShock (360) (Rab), Space Giraffe (360) (Rab), Zombie Virus (PS2) (Rab), Robin Hood's Quest and Snow Queen Quest (PS2) (Ryan), GrimGrimoire (PS2) (Ryan), Railfan (PS3) (Rab). Gaming: Drunk Rab and Ryan revisit old games (3 segments): Pipi & Bibi's (arcade), Bobby is Going Home (Atari 2600), Buck Rogers: Planet of Zoom (Atari 2600). Sketches: Loud children's birthday party intro, Peter Molyneux understands love, Phil Collins' rotating head, The Mass Effect song, End of Level Boss and Mid-Level Sub-Boss: a viewer reacts, Super Nintendo, Safe Gaming by Sammy Miller: handheld gaming tips (feat. Rihanna and Phil Collins), Online Gaming with Robert Lefever, RATSAMAN LeGeORGE: halo cury (sic), Auto-erotic Wii Fit. Notes: This episode was released virally over BitTorrent, rather than via the Consolevania website, the in-story justification for this being that it was being leaked by Rab and Ryan without the permission of the Sponsors. The alternate title The Black Episode and catalogue number are references to Prince's unreleased Black Album. The audio of End of Level Boss and Mid-level Sub-Boss is taken from their first appearance in episode 1.4. Final Sammy Miller sketch.
20	4	"'C' Episode 1 (Episode 3.4)"	9 October 2007	15'47"
Reviews: NASCAR 08 (360) (Zack), Two Worlds (360) (Zack), NASCAR 08 (360) (Ziggy). Gaming: 'C' exclusive top ten video games of all time (10-1): Sim 2: Bon Voyage, Blues Brothers 2000, the Harry Potter titles, Street Trace NYC, Sim 2: H&M Fashion Stuff, Two Worlds, GoldenEye: Rogue Agent, ArchLord, Lair, NASCAR 08. Sketches: Zack Eastwood's guide to dating, viewers' jokes. Notes: This episode is presented in-story as having been produced by the Sponsors after the suspension of Rab and Ryan, and is fronted by Ziggy Springsteen and Zack Eastwood (played by Limmy). After this episode was released, an announcement was posted on the Consolevania website's news page stating that the Sponsors had terminated their relationship with Ziggy Springsteen, and that all rights to Consolevania had reverted to the original owners. Zack Eastwood made several appearances on the third series of videoGaiden, which entered production shortly after this episode was released.
21	5	"Lost and Found (Episode 3.5)"	n/a	unknown
Notes: This episode of Consolevania is currently missing. In an attempt to reflect the in-story developments of Series 3, in which Rab and Ryan would go underground and struggle with the Sponsors for control of the show, the episode was recorded to a single VHS cassette, which was then taped to the side of a bin by the riverside in Glasgow. A hint that this location was significant was placed at the end of a redubbed Halo advert which was released on the Consolevania YouTube channel on 12 September 2007 (see episode 3.7). The production team intended for one of the viewers to spot the hint, retrieve the tape, and upload the recording to the internet. The cassette was apparently collected, but the episode has never appeared online. A single short excerpt from the introduction (viewable here) is the only material retained by the production team.
22	6	"Series Four Wave 1 (Episode 3.6)"	17 November 2008	50'26"
Reviews: The Call of Cthulhu: Darkness Within (Mobile) (Rab), Lego Batman (360) (Ryan), LittleBigPlanet (PS3) (Rab), Wipeout HD (PS3) (Rab), World of Goo (PC) Ryan). Sketches: Warhammer WAR Stories (two segments), Checkin The Forums, What Music Goes With It, Molyneux Moments: Dog, Bond Girl, 50 Dollars for Bone Training, Wii Music: Steel Drums, The Consolevania Interview: David Icke on his upcoming MMORPG 'Lizardo'. Notes: Wave 1 was inaugurated on 10 October 2008, when reviews and sketches began to appear on Consolevania's YouTube channel. The Wipeout HD review, the What Music Goes With It sketch, and the David Icke 'interview' were exclusive to the Wave 1 episode release. Two segments produced as part of Wave 1 but not included in this episode were eventually included in episode 3.7 (see below).
23	7	"Second Wave, a.k.a. Series Four Wave 2 (Episode 3.7)"	3 April 2018	36'58"
Reviews: Fallout 3 (Rab), Persona 4 (Ryan). Gaming: Independents Day 24.10.08 (Depths of Peril, Synthesia, Barnstorming), Independents Day 31.10.08 (Mount and Blade, Intercept, Crow in Hell). Sketches: Pop!, Checkin The Forums, Andy Ben on FIFA 09, Halo 3: be abused, Ziggy Springsteen: welcome to Consolemania. Notes: Wave 2 was inaugurated on 29 November 2008. Only four videos (the intro, Pop!, Andy Ben, and the Fallout 4 review) were uploaded before production ceased in December 2008. A full-length episode was eventually released via YouTube on 3 April 2018, consisting of the four original segments, as well as two segments (Checkin The Forums and the Persona 4 review) which had been completed but not uploaded in 2008, and four segments which were not originally intended for Wave 2: the two Independents Day segments (released as part of Wave 1, but not included in episode 3.6), the Halo 3 advert (originally uploaded to YouTube on 12 September 2007), and the Ziggy Springsteen video (an altered version of one which originally appeared on the main page of the Consolevania website during the period of the Sponsors' takeover in 2007). Kenny's Chat Show, which is trailed in the Wave 2 intro, was never filmed.
24	8	"Consolevania Christmas Carol (Episode 3.8)"	16 January 2009	23'56"
Gaming: Consolevania's Top Ten Games of 2008 (actually Rab announcing the end of the show and the reasons for its cancellation, over footage of the Top Ten Games) — part 1 (Grand Theft Auto IV, LittleBigPlanet, Left 4 Dead), part 2 (World of Goo, Persona 4), part 3 (Banjo-Kazooie: Nuts & Bolts, Lost Odyssey, Dead Space), part 4 (Fallout 3, Metal Gear Solid 4). Sketches: TEAM Christmas, Kenny's had enough of Christmas, the Ghost of Christmas Specials Past, the Ghost of Christmas Present, Andy Ben: gamers are dying, the Ghost of Christmas Specials Future, Rab and Ryan's Christmas present, series 4 simulation ended, Ziggy Springsteen's triumph. Notes: Final episode of the original (2004–09) run of Consolevania. This episode, numbering itself "3.6", retroactively incorporated Series Four Wave 1 into series 3 as episode 3.5. This retroactive numbering excluded the Lost and Found episode from 2007 and the material released in Wave 2 in late 2008, and has itself been superseded following the release of episode 3.7 in 2018. Final appearance of Joanne Daly.

=== Series 4 (2017) ===
No. overall	No. in series	Title	Original release date	Running time
25	1	"Episode 4.1"	18 February 2017	39'28"
Reviews: Dogchild (PS4) (Ryan), The Flame in the Flood (Gerry), Resident Evil 7 vs. Tales of Berseria (Rab). Gaming: 2009-16 game roundup with Rab and Ryan (The Last Story, Xenoblade Chronicles, Bloodborne, Dark Souls, Journey, Dokapon Kingdom, Kirby's Epic Yarn, Super Mario Galaxy 2, The Evil Within, Her Story, New Style Boutique, Hatsune Miku: Project DIVA, The Last Guardian). Sketches: Nintendo Switch advert (Come), Know What I Meme, The Consolevania Podcast starring Gerry, End of Level Boss and Mid-Level Sub-Boss: cup of java, Reggie's X-rated Switch interview, T2 TEAMspotting. Notes: First episode released exclusively to supporters via Patreon. First appearance of Gerry McLaughlin in Consolevania (as reviewer and performer). First appearance of End of Level Boss and Mid-Level Sub-Boss since episode 3.3, and first new material featuring the characters since episode 2.5.
26	2	"n (Episode 4.2)"	31 March 2017	30'25"
Reviews: Nioh and Torment: Tides of Numenera (Rab), Night in the Woods (Gerry), NieR: Automata (Ryan). Sketches: Persona 5, Calendar Girl, Gerry interviews the public, Philip and Phillip on diversity in video game lead characters (a.k.a. Bobby Brownhair), the Lies Booth (Ryan on BioShock Infinite), the Lies Booth (Rab on Assassin's Creed), Xbox advert (TV-am vs. Five Nights at Freddy's), Trump: The Game, Here Comes The Hot-Taker music video.
27	3	"Episode 4.3"	30 April 2017	33'48"
Reviews: Paradigm and Domina (Ryan), Mass Effect: Andromeda (Gerry), The Legend of Zelda: Breath of the Wild (Rab and Ryan), Stories Untold (Rab). Sketches: Edith and Rosemary's Frightful Memories: Zool, Consolevania Info News, Gerry comes out to his dads as a Nintendo non-fan (intro to Breath of the Wild review), Metacriticwatch, Peter Moore career retrospective. Notes: The opening to this episode was shot outside the University of Glasgow's QMU building, where the earliest Consolevania footage (the first Legend segment) was shot. The previous Edith and Rosemary segment appeared in episode 3.2.
28	4	"Episode 4.4"	31 May 2017	29'48"
Reviews: For Honor (Gerry), StarCrawlers (Rab), Dandy Dungeon and What Remains of Edith Finch (Ryan). Sketches: Xbox One advert (Very British Xenophobia), Brian Blessed returns to Consolevania, All Those Little Men, Ask Gerry, Star Trek: Bridge Crew, Rab and Ryan on the run, K-Corp, Ask Kenny. Notes: Brian Blessed previously appeared as the 'director' of Consolevania in 'The Consolevania Story' (episode 2.7).
29	5	"Episode 4.5"	30 June 2017	32'21"
Reviews: Conarium and Tokyo 42 (Ryan), Little Nightmares (Gerry), Mansions of Madness (Rab). Sketches: Father's Day, Xbox One advert (Web Porn), Old Gamers Reminisce (several segments), Kenny and the Nazis, Conti Neweti pays you a visit, Nintendo Switch advert (Reggie in the House), Fake Game Devs. Notes: The Fake Game Devs sketch was also uploaded to XVideos.
30	6	"Episode 4.6"	31 July 2017	30'19"
Reviews: Horizon Zero Dawn (Gerry), Morrowind Online (Ryan), Euro Truck Simulator 2 (Rab). Sketches: The Glasgow heatwave (several segments), The 80s British games industry, We Are The Modders, Brian Horde's Funseum, Video Game Unicorn (intro to the Euro Truck Simulator 2 review), IGN Live.
31	7	"Episode 4.7"	31 August 2017	31'09"
Reviews: Hellblade: Senua's Sacrifice (Ryan), Constructor (Gerry), Absolver (Rab). Gaming: The News Bin with Rab and Ryan (previews of Sonic Mania and Shenmue 3), Cheats in Videogames with Rab and Ryan (a discussion of cheat codes in old games). Sketches: Peter Molyneux: The Live Séance (with Derek Acorah), Xbox One advert (Gamer Cribs), Derek Acorah: the Game (several segments), Only Games in Boxes (an Only Fools and Horses parody, serving as the intro to the Constructor review).
32	8	"Consolevania: 2007/2017 Prologue (Episode 4.8)"	30 September 2017	32'57"
Reviews: Fighting Fantasy Legends and Quake Champions (Rab), 88 Heroes (Gerry), The Pillars of the Earth and Echo (Ryan). Gaming: 2007 games retrospective with Ryan (Super Mario Galaxy, Portal, Halo 3, Overlord, The Darkness, Mass Effect, Naruto: Rise of a Ninja). Sketches: Gerry Philadelphia 2007 (several segments), Sega Saturn advert (David Icke), Cosplay the Consolevania Way #4: Ruiner, Kenny Glasgow 2007 (several segments), Checkin The Forums (several segments), 10 Characters including Conti Neweti (intercut with the 88 Heroes review), a new Atari console, Philip and Phillip spot a new Bobby Brownhair (Red Dead Redemption 2 trailer). Notes: This episode incorporates previously unseen material shot during the production of episode 3.2 in 2007. The first three Cosplayer segments all appeared in episode 1.2. Checkin The Forums first appeared in episode 3.5.
33	9	"Consolevania: 2007/2017 Part 1 (Episode 4.9)"	31 October 2017	35'07"
Reviews: Super Mario Odyssey (Rab), Ruiner and Cuphead (Ryan), Agents of Mayhem (Gerry). Sketches: Where does Gerry come from?, Hot Property with Jeff (redubbed Wolfenstein II cut scene), Gerryspeshal (several segments), Brian Horde presents the Consolevania App. Notes: This episode revisits and expands on the storyline of Series 3.
34	10	"Consolevania: 2007/2017 Part 2 (Episode 4.10)"	30 November 2017	31'28"
Reviews: South Park: The Fractured but Whole (Gerry), Wolfenstein II (Ryan), Divinity: Original Sin II (Rab); Sketches: Kenny Kenny Kenny Kenny (episode intro), Consolevania Twitch (several segments), Ryan explains the Nazis to Gerry (several segments, including the intros to South Park and Divinity), Animal Crossing: Pocket Camp, Kenny explains it all. Notes: Following on from the previous episode, this episode ties up loose ends from Series 3 and incorporates them into the overarching plot of Series 4.
35	11	"Consolevania Christmas 2017"	26 December 2017	37'01"
Reviews: Star Wars Battlefront II (Gerry), Culdcept Revolt (Rab). Gaming: Ryan's Christmas 1992 Amiga retrospective (also featuring recommendations for Monument Valley 2, Finding Paradise, and Universal Paperclips). Sketches: Kojima Station: Kojima Cut (Geoff Keighley - Gorgeous), the Consolevania boys go to Super Bario (several segments), John Gacy's Kiddies Corner (Christmas edition), Silent Night. Notes: This episode was produced as part of the Series 4 production block, but was not assigned an episode number. First appearance of John Gacy since episode 2.5.

=== Series 5 (2018) ===
No. overall	No. in series	Title	Original release date	Running time
36	1	"Episode 5.1"	31 January 2018	35'27"
Reviews: Hidden Agenda (Gerry), Owlboy and Shovel Knight (Ryan), Gorogoa (Rab). Gaming: Ryan's Top Three of 2017 (3. Hellblade, 2. Breath of the Wild, 1. NieR: Automata), Rab's Top Three of 2017: (3. Breath of the Wild, 2. Hatsune Miku: Project DIVA Future Tone, 1. Divinity: Original Sin II). Sketches: Doing Something Special: brainstorming, Nintendo Switch advert (first time), Mad Fun: electrotherapy at Braeholm, Doing Something Special: exclusive announcement. Notes: At the end of this episode, the Consolevania team announced that they will be making a film about eSports.
37	2	"Episode 5.2"	28 February 2018	34'05"
Reviews: Assassin's Creed Origins (Gerry), Monster Hunter: World (Rab, Ryan, Gerry), The Warlock of Firetop Mountain (Rab), Subnautica (Ryan). Sketches: Don't Panic, Inside the Actors Studio: Gerry (in Forrest Gump), Inside the Actors Studio: Ryan (in The Best of Both Worlds), Costing a Film, Inside the Actors Studio: Rab (in The Godfather), Burnout Paradise Remastered, Setting the Tone. Notes: Several segments in this episode explore the ramifications of the previous episode's dramatic announcement, as TEAM realise what they have let themselves in for.
38	3	"Episode 5.3"	31 March 2018	29'56"
Reviews: The End Is Nigh (Gerry), Observer and A Way Out (Ryan), Into the Breach (Rab). Sketches: Happy Easter (intro), review of the GPD 32, One More Announcement, Guru Gameej Ruminazionz, Under the Bridge.
39	4	"Episode 5.4"	30 April 2018	35'30"
Reviews: Q.U.B.E. 2 (Ryan), Extinction (Gerry), Farm Manager 2018 (Rab). Gaming: Watching trailers with TEAM (Aven Colony, Murderous Pursuits, Tharsis). Sketches: Xbox One advert (depression), Like and Subscribe, Cory Barlog: Don't Make Me Wait, Consolevania Brain Omega Plus Power Pill, Rockstar Press Conference.
40	5	"Episode 5.5"	31 May 2018	32'03"
Reviews: Detroit: Become Human (Ryan), Aven Colony (Gerry), Cultist Simulator (Rab). Sketches: The Birds (intro), Metal Gear Solid: The Movie, Gaming Mechanics, Conti Neweti on GDPR, Xbox One advert (gurning), James Whale on arcade gaming, TEAM: calling out Team17. Notes: This episode is dedicated to Scott Hutchison. First TEAM call-out since episode 2.6.
41	6	"Episode 5.6"	30 June 2018	31'03"
Reviews: Vampyr (Ryan), God of War (Gerry), Fortnite (Rab). Gaming: E3 2018 Reaction Party. Sketches: Lil' Glitch on The Crew 2, Sting & Shaggy, Philip and Phillip on Just Cause 4.
42	7	"Episode 5.7"	31 July 2018	30'27"
Reviews: Iconoclasts (Ryan), Lego The Incredibles (Gerry), Octopath Traveler (Rab, feat. Sting and Shaggy). Sketches: Nintendo Switch advert (Go Vacation: UK edition), Brian Horde Fitness in Gaming!, #seriousissueswithconsolevania, No Man's Sky: every procedural, I Like The Same Thing As You.
43	8	"Episode 5.8"	31 August 2018	35'32"
Reviews: Adventure Time: Pirates of the Enchiridion (Gerry), We Happy Few (Ryan), Shenmue and Shenmue II HD ports (Rab). Gaming: Drivetime with Consolevania (Rab and Ryan preview Cyberpunk 2077, reflect on Resident Evil 2, and discuss Al Jolson biopics). Sketches: Ashley Boastful's achievements, Consolevania Pirate Radio, Shinmury 3 trailer, A Youtube Influencer.
44	9	"Episode 5.9"	30 September 2018	31'05"
Reviews: Mehsoft Games review: Underground Man and Mercury Man (Ryan), Spider-Man (Gerry), VCB: Why City (Rab). Gaming: TED Talk: The State of the Videogame Industry. Sketches: Reactions to the Consolevania Movie Trailer (two segments), Rab's Unboxing Video (Valkyria Chronicles 4 Premium Edition), Great E-Sports Moments (1982-88), Xbox One advert (gamers), Top 10 Chart Shows Hits Chart Show Games, Consolevania Brain Omega Plus Power Pills endorsements, Gerry's focus.
45	10	"Episode 5.10"	31 October 2018	32'51"
Reviews: Valkyria Chronicles 4 (Rab), FIFA 19 (Gerry), Astro Bot Rescue Mission (Ryan). Gaming: Talking Cowboys with Consolevania. Sketches: Cowboy Builders, Noah Lotte's Reviews of Tomorrow - Today, Elon Musk's journey of hope, Starlink: Battle for Atlas advert.
46	11	"Episode 5.11"	30 November 2018	34'12"
Reviews: Red Dead Redemption 2 (Gerry), Carrots and Cream + Blind Date (Ryan), Diablo III: Eternal Collection + Horizon Chase Turbo (Switch) (Rab). Gaming: Amiga 500 package adverts (several segments), Consolevania's favourite games of 2018. Sketches: BBC2 commentary on World Championship Asteroids (1981), Santa Neweti, Kenny's inspirational intervention.
47	12	"Sting & Shaggy's consolevania Hogmanay Hootenanny (Episode 5.12)"	31 December 2018	32'25"
Reviews: Virtual Reality is now here: Moss + Tetris Effect (Ryan), Labyrinth of Refrain: Coven of Dusk (Rab and Hope), Civilization VI (Gerry). Gaming: 2019 preview with Ryan (Vane, Sekiro: Shadows Die Twice, Soundfall), 2019 preview with Rab (Resident Evil 2, Nioh 2, Shenmue 3). Sketches: Sting and Shaggy (multiple segments), Sting: here comes 2019, Bono of U2 (two segments), Shaggy and Frogger.

=== Series 6 (2019) ===
No. overall	No. in series	Title	Original release date	Running time
48	1	"Episode 6.1 (The Resident Evil 2 Special)"	31 January 2019	30'03"
Reviews: Resident Evil 2 (Rab, with Ryan and Gerry), Hello Neighbor (Gerry), Lucius III (Ryan). Gaming: RIP Wii Shop Channel. Sketches: Apple's Netflix for Games.
49	2	"The Wellness Special (Episode 6.2)"	28 February 2019	28'59"
Reviews: Ace Combat 7: Skies Unknown (Gerry), Subnautica: Below Zero + Astroneer (Ryan), Eastshade (Rab). Gaming: Ryan on mindfulness and flow in games. Sketches: Maximise Your Gaming Potentiality with Gerry McMaster.
50	3	"The Website Special (Episode 6.3)"	31 March 2019	28'15"
Reviews: Shadowgun Legends (Gerry), Devil May Cry 5 (Ryan), Sekiro: Shadows Die Twice (Rab). Sketches: The Consolevania website relaunch (several segments), Who Is Scott Shechter?
51	4	"The Sitcom Special (Episode 6.4)"	30 April 2019	30'13"
Reviews: Super Blood Hockey (Gerry), Death Mark (Rab), Ghost Giant (Ryan). Sketches: Steptoe and Son, Whatever Happened to the Likely Lads?, The Big Bang Theory.
52	5	"The VR Special (Episode 6.5)"	31 May 2019	32'55"
Reviews: Blood & Truth (Gerry), Everybody's Golf VR (Ryan). Gaming: Rab's Adventures in VR (several segments). Sketches: Xbox One advert (virtual sex), Virgil Reality.
53	6	"The Staying In Special (Episode 6.6)"	30 June 2019	38'43"
Reviews: Aces of the Luftwaffe (Gerry), Outer Wilds (Ryan), Lapis x Labyrinth (Rab). Gaming: Bench Press (Rab and Ryan discuss E3 and the retirement of Reggie Fils-Aimé), Wee Go on the Switch (Nippon Marathon), Gerry's fever dream (Civilization IV, Journey, Proteus). Sketches: Fanart Fantasia.
54	7	"Interlude (Episode 6.7)"	31 July 2019	43'33"
Reviews: Wolfenstein: Youngblood (Ryan), Fishing Star: World Tour (Rab), Dragon Quest Builders 2 (Rab). Gaming: Watching the Trailers with Rab and Ryan (Anodyne 2, Rune Factory 4 Special, Disaster Report: Summer Memories). Sketches: Rab and Ryan discuss their intentions and hopes for the future of Consolevania in several extended segments throughout the episode, ahead of the new series and a shakeup of the show's format. Notes: Gerry receives a credit, but does not appear in this episode. Part of one of the discussion segments was filmed during a live YouTube chat on Consolevania's channel, which became the 26 July instalment of Friday Night Consolevania.

=== Series 7 (2019-20) ===
No. overall	No. in series	Title	Original release date	Running time
55	1	"Episode 7.1"	31 August 2019	44'26"
Reviews: A Train Exp (Ryan), Telling Lies (Rab), A Short Hike (Ryan), Astral Chain (Rab). Gaming: World of Warcraft reminiscences. Interstitials: Rab and Ryan's discussion and reminiscences. Notes: Gerry receives a credit, but does not appear in this episode.
56	2	"Episode 7.2"	30 September 2019	37'49"
Reviews: Control (Gerry), Untitled Goose Game (Rab), Daemon X Machina (Rab), Link's Awakening (Switch) (Ryan). Interstitials: On the way to the office; setting up; fajitas. Notes: Gerry returns after a two-episode absence.
57	3	"Episode 7.3"	31 October 2019	40'18"
Reviews: Dusk Diver (Ryan), NHL 20 (Gerry), The Outer Worlds (Rab). Gaming: Mega Drive Mini. Interstitials: Dumbarton; soup.
58	4	"Six Chapters (1-3) (a.k.a. Episode 7.4)"	30 November 2019	36'01"
Reviews: Luigi's Mansion 3 (Gerry), Death Stranding (Rab), Fallen Order (Ryan). Gaming: Rab's unveiling of Shenmue 3 (two segments). Interstitials: Costa and parents; Riverhill and Shenmue. Notes: The episode is divided into three chapters onscreen: 1. Gerry; 2. Rab; 3. Ryan.
59	5	"Episode 7.5"	31 December 2019	42'05"
Reviews: Call of Duty: Modern Warfare (Gerry), Wattam (Ryan), The C64 Micro Computer feat. Gribbly's Day Out, Monty on the Run, Speedball 2 (Rab, with Ryan). Gaming: The C64 Micro Computer unboxing video with Rab and Ryan, Rab and the C64, Rab and Ryan talk Christmas gaming. Sketches: Ryan and Gerry WLTM other gamers, Conti Neweti's Christmas speech.
60	6	"Episode 7.6"	31 January 2020	52'37"
Reviews: Klask (Rab and Gerry), Mosaic (Ryan), Ghostbusters: the Video Game Remastered (Gerry). Gaming: Rab, in the bath, with the Switch (feat. Psikyo Shooting Stars Alpha). Interstitials: In the car; dinner 1 - Call of Duty etc.; dinner 2 - something left in the basement; dinner 3 - best game of the 2010s; dinner 4 - Dark Souls, Minecraft, The Last of Us. Notes: Several segments in this episode trail forthcoming changes for Consolevania. Final appearance to date of Gerry McLaughlin as a member of the regular cast; he announces his retirement from the show in the second dinner segment.

=== Series 8 (2020-22) ===
No. overall	No. in series	Title	Original release date	Running time
61	1	"Series 8 Prologue: Pro Steamers (a.k.a. Episode 8.1)"	29 February 2020	37'32"
Reviews: Slay the Spire (Rab), Ciel Fledge / Hearts of Iron IV / Dreams (Ryan), Hunt: Showdown (Rab). Twitch: Rab punches across dimensions, Ryan plays West of Dead (with Rab v/o), No Way No Way, Hello My Friend Are You Ready To Die? Sketches: Pro Steamers (several segments). Notes: Gerry does not appear in Series 8, and is not credited. A new overarching storyline begins, in which Rab and Ryan become pro streamers on the Consolevania Twitch channel. Some of the in-game footage is taken from the Twitch stream.
62	2	"Episode 8.2"	31 March 2020	52'56"
Reviews: Animal Crossing: New Horizons (Ryan), Half-Life: Alyx (Rab), Doom Eternal (Rab). Gaming: Trailer Trash Talk (feat. trailers for The Complex, Hatsune Miku: Project DIVA MegaMix, Imperator: Rome, and Tony Hawk's Pro Skater 2), ~~Rab's Switch Collection~~ The Switch Ditch (feat. Tiny Barbarian, Slay the Spire, Bubble Bobble 4 Friends, Rune Factory 4 Special, Under Night In-Birth Exe:Late [cl-r], Samurai Showdown, Atelier Ryza: Ever Darkness & the Secret Hideout, and Doraemon Story of Seasons). Twitch: Rab's Twitch meltdown, Boris Johnson Animal Crossing. Sketches: Bob Ross paints. Notes: Due to the United Kingdom's lockdown in response to the coronavirus pandemic, Rab and Ryan were unable to meet in person to work on this episode, and all collaborative segments were produced via Skype videoconferencing. The segments comprising the episode are edited together in real time.
63	3	"Episode 8.3"	30 April 2020	47'18"
Reviews: Resident Evil 3 (Ryan), Final Fantasy VII Remake (Rab). Gaming: The Switch Ditch (feat. ESP Ra.De. Psi). Twitch: Classic Consolevania Twitch Moments (several segments). Sketches: Greenscreen introduction. Notes: Due to the ongoing lockdown, Rab and Ryan streamed this episode live from their respective homes on the Consolevania Twitch channel on 30 April 2020, with pre-recorded segments such as the reviews being played into the stream. The episode was released to Patreon supporters later the same day. The in-game footage of Resident Evil 3 was taken from the Twitch stream.
64	4	"Episode 8.4"	31 May 2020	58'18"
Reviews: Hatsune Miku: Project DIVA MegaMix (Rab), Mortal Kombat XL (Ryan). Gaming: The Switch Ditch (feat. Xenoblade Chronicles: Definitive Edition (collector's edition), Link's Awakening (collector's edition), Downwell, Crystal Crisis, Hatsune Miku, La•Mulana 1+2, SNK 40th Anniversary Collection Final Fantasy X/X-2 HD Remaster, VA-11 Hall-A, Disgaea 4 and 5, Langrisser I & II). Twitch: Classic Consolevania Twitch Moments (Ryan cancels himself playing Alien: Isolation and Animal Crossing, Rab has a shite in Disaster Report 4, the Dotterelia talking point, I came to make President Kirishima get on his knees!), Vintage Consolevania Twitch Moments: 42 Seconds #2, It's Bobby's Bit! Sketches: Greenscreen introduction. Notes: Rab and Ryan streamed this episode live from their respective homes on the Consolevania Twitch channel on 31 May 2020, with reviews and other pre-recorded segments being played into the stream. Two subscribers to the Twitch channel, VivaLaHazy85 and DarrenBok, also participated in the live segments, VivaLaHazy85 supplying the Link's Awakening collector's edition for the Switch Ditch. The episode was released to Patreon supporters later the same day. The in-game footage in the reviews was taken from the Twitch stream.
65	5	"Episode 8.5"	30 June 2020	57'10"
Reviews: River City Girls (Rab), The Last of Us Part II (Ryan). Gaming: The Switch Ditch (feat. River City Girls (collector's edition), World of Final Fantasy Maxima, I Am Setsuna, Steins;Gate Elite, Little Dragons Café, The Raven Remastered, Link's Awakening (again)). Twitch: Ryan plays one of the greatest games ever made: Shenmue (three segments). Sketches: River City: Twitch. Notes: Rab and Ryan streamed this episode live from their respective homes on the Consolevania Twitch channel on 30 June 2020, with reviews and other pre-recorded segments being played into the stream. The episode was released to Patreon supporters later the same day. The in-game footage in the Last of Us Part II review and the Shenmue segments was taken from the Twitch stream.
66	6	"Episode 8.6"	31 July 2020	40'35"
Reviews: Morrowind 2020 (Ryan), Final Fantasy Trading Card Game (Rab), My Hero: One's Justice (Rab). Gaming: The Switch Ditch (feat. Undertale (collector's edition), The End Is Nigh, Civilization VI, The Legend of Heroes: Trails of Cold Steel III, My Hero: One's Justice, Warhammer 40,000: Mechanicus, the Atelier Dusk trilogy, Hyrule Warriors: Definitive Edition, Tokyo Mirage Sessions #FE Encore, Void Terrarium (limited edition)). Twitch: Morrowind: Ryan Steals Stuff. Notes: Rab and Ryan streamed this episode live from their respective homes on the Consolevania Twitch channel on 31 July 2020, with reviews and other pre-recorded segments being played into the stream. The episode was released to Patreon supporters later the same day. Ryan originally reviewed Morrowind in 2004, in episode 1.1. Due to a technical error, Rab's review of My Hero: One's Justice was missing most of his voiceover.
67	7	"Episode 8.7"	31 August 2020	48'34"
Reviews: Manifold Garden (Ryan), Spiritfarer (Ryan), Mr. Driller Drill Land (Rab). Gaming: The Switch Ditch (feat. Katamari Damacy Reroll, Ion Fury, Call of Cthulhu, Old School Musical, Burnout Paradise Remastered, Octahedron, Aggelos, Gorogoa, Gone Home). Sketches: Geoff and Emmett talk Surgeon Simulator. Notes: Rab and Ryan streamed this episode live from their respective homes on the Consolevania Twitch channel on 31 August 2020, with reviews and other pre-recorded segments being played into the stream. The episode was released to Patreon supporters later the same day.
68	8	"Episode 8.8"	30 September 2020	49'05"
Reviews: Super Mario Galaxy (in Super Mario 3D All-Stars) plus When the Past was Around and Hotshot Racing (Ryan), 13 Sentinels: Aegis Rim (Rab). Gaming: The Switch Ditch (feat. Streets of Rage 4). Sketches: Rab's Book Corner (feat. Piranesi and Japansoft: An Oral History). Notes: Rab and Ryan streamed this episode live from their respective homes on the Consolevania Twitch channel on 30 September 2020, with reviews and other pre-recorded segments being played into the stream. The episode was released to Patreon supporters later the same day.
69	9	"Consolevania Halloween Edition Live"	31 October 2020	31'04"
Reviews: Spooktober Horror Games: Devotion, P.T., Phasmophobia, Left 4 Dead 2 (Ryan), Fade (Rab). Gaming: Horror Board Games with Rab: Hako Onna, Nyctophobia, Mall of Horror, Horrified, Arkham Horror, Psycho Raiders. Sketches: Rab streaming at Halloween (several segments), Rab's Live Review of Death Mark. Notes: Although this was framed as another live Twitch episode featuring Rab (with a long prerecorded video segment by Ryan), this is the first fully pre-recorded episode since 8.2, and was uploaded straight to Patreon on 31 October rather than being streamed on Twitch. The in-game footage from Ryan's segment was taken from the Twitch stream.
70	10	"Next Gen Special"	30 November 2020	39'12"
Gaming: Rab's Xbox Series X unboxing and review, Drivetime with Consolevania (Xbox Game Pass), Rab's PS5 (controller) review (ft. Astro Bot, Demon's Souls and NBA2K21), Xbox Series X vs PS5. Sketches: PS5 delivery, DF video game analysis: Digital Factory with David Kimenekinin, Rab interviews Phil Spencer about Microsoft's acquisition of Bethesda. Notes: Ryan is credited in this episode, but does not appear (for the first time since episode 3.4).
71	11	"End Of Year Special"	31 December 2020	41'18"
Reviews: Star Wars Jedi: Fallen Order again (Ryan). Gaming: Ryan plays Halo on Twitch, Rab's top 3 games of 2020 (3. The Pathless, 2. Sakuna: Of Rice and Ruin, 1. Final Fantasy VII Remake), Ryan's games of 2020 (The Last of Us Part II, A Short Hike, Spiritfarer, Animal Crossing: New Horizons). Notes: Rab and Ryan are together in person in this episode for the first time since episode 8.1. This episode was originally uploaded to YouTube in truncated form, with some of the Fallen Order review missing. The full episode was uploaded on 1 January 2021. Ryan previously reviewed Fallen Order in episode 7.4; the game video in this review is taken from his Twitch stream.
72	12	"Consolevania With The Family"	31 January 2021	31'41"
Reviews: Ryan's short reviews (Old Man's Journey, Sunlight, I Am Dead, Encodya, Donut County, Breath of the Wild), Hitman 3 (Rab). Gaming: The Switch Ditch (feat. Ori (collector's edition), Sakuna: Of Rice and Ruin (Golden Harvest edition), Aleste Collection). Sketches: Ryan's Lockdown Family.
73	13	"Just What The World Needs, Another Fuckin"	28 February 2021	49'41"
Reviews: Death Crown (Ryan), Relaxing Games with Ryan (A Glider's Journey, The Eyrie), Moon (Rab). Gaming: Demo Moore (demos of Bravely Default 2 and Project Triangle Strategy and Exo One), The Big Boss Man Ray's Traylors (trailers of Pokémon Legends: Arceus, Five Nights at Freddy's: Security Breach, and Sifu). Sketches: Consolevania: imagine this was a podcast (several segments)
74	14	"NFT"	31 March 2021	28'33"
Reviews: Black Legend (Ryan), Loop Hero (Ryan), Monster Hunter Rise (Rab). Sketches: Rab and Ryan sell episode 1 of Consolevania as an NFT (several segments).
75	15	"The Architect"	30 April 2021	31'17"
Reviews: Mundaun (Ryan), Maskmaker (Ryan). Gaming: Rab and Ryan's N64 Memories, Rab's N64 collection (feat. the kill room, Diddy Kong Racing, Star Wars Episode I: Racer, Mario Kart 64, Ridge Racer 64, Mystical Ninja Starring Goemon), Ryan's gaming angst and retro gaming (feat. Final Fantasy VII, Pac-Man 99 and Super Bomberman R).
76	16	"Yes I Can"	31 May 2021	32'28"
Reviews: Resident Evil Village (Ryan), GORSD (Rab), Subnautica: Below Zero (Ryan), Obakeidoro! (Rab). Sketches: Animal Crossing: Ryan's new purple villager. Notes: the game footage from the Resident Evil Village review comes from Ryan's Twitch stream.
77	17	"no episode of consolevania this month"	30 June 2021	44'59"
Reviews: Mario Golf: Super Rush (Rab), Police Simulator: Patrol Officers (Ryan). Gaming: MiSTer FPGA, Top 5 Demos of E3 2021 That I Know About (feat. Sable, Death Trash, Gloomwood, TOEM, Terra Nil), the MiSTer FPGA (feat. Ghouls 'n Ghosts and Speedball 2). Sketches: In the garden (several segments), Ryan talks (feat. anxiety, E3, and Elden Ring), Rab talks longform content and Ghouls 'n Ghosts, the original Consolevania camera, Drivetime with Consolevania (longform content, Gerry, Cyberpunk, etc.).
78	18	"Consolevania - The Birthday Show"	31 July 2021	103'36"
Reviews: Iris.Fall (Rab), Chicory: A Colorful Tale (Ryan), Curved Space (Ryan), Grindstone (Rab). Sketches: Rab's birthday (several segments), How collections can save your life by Ryan Macleod, Ringo remembers, Trains! Notes: This is the longest episode of Consolevania to date. The 'Rab's birthday' segments use footage from Ryan's Twitch stream.
79	19	"Episode 8.19"	31 August 2021	71'59"
Reviews: Prodeus (Ryan), Aliens: Fireteam Elite and Quake(Rab), Glyph (Ryan), Shadowverse: Champion's Battle (Rab). Sketches: Pre-titles: in the garden with anxiety (and Rab and Ryan), making connections with Ryan (feat. Morrowind, Twelve Minutes and Dark Souls). Notes: The pre-title segment, a conversation lasting approximately 47 minutes, is the longest single segment in the episode.
80	20	"Consolevania - Pessimism"	30 September 2021	36'53"
Reviews: WarioWare: Get It Together! (Ryan), Tales of Arise (Rab), The Magnificent Trufflepigs (Ryan). Gaming: Ryan and pessimism and games, Rab and GamesMaster. Sketches: Ryan plays The Hobbit, Sir Clive RIP, Ryan plays Chuckie Egg. Notes: This episode is dedicated to Sir Clive Sinclair. It was released the day after it was announced that Rab is to be one of the hosts of the reboot of GamesMaster on E4.
81	21	"Consolevania Halloween 21"	31 October 2021	42'52"
Reviews: Back 4 Blood (Ryan), Resident Evil 4 VR (Rab), Doki Doki Literature Club! (Ryan), Guided Meditation VR (Rab). Gaming: Talking Games with Ryan: Episode #136, Lifeboat.
82	22	"Consolevania Wrapped Up"	30 November 2021	37'48"
Reviews: 2021 winter playlist (bath sealant, Halo Infinite, GTA San Andreas – The Definitive Edition and Animal Crossing update) (Ryan), Dungeon Encounters (Rab), Omno and Exo One (Ryan), Muse Dash and Vectronom (Rab). Gaming: The Switch Ditch with Rab (feat. Shin Megami Tensei V, The House in Fata Morgana, Muse Dash and Vectronom (see above)).
83	23	"A Christmas Very Happy Consolevania New Year"	31 December 2021	63'33"
Reviews: Metroid Dread (Rab), Cursed Castilla and Okinawa Rush (Rab), Grim Games with Ryan (The Plane Effect, Generation Zero, Kid A Mnesia Exhibition), The House in Fata Morgana (Rab). Gaming: Games of Christmasses Past and Present with Ryan (2006: The Matrix: Path of Neo, Need for Speed: Carbon; 1991: Jimmy White's 'Whirlwind' Snooker, Lemmings, Lotus (video game series)#Lotus Turbo Challenge 2, Speedball 2; 2021 GamesMaster, Halo Infinite), The Matrix Awakens with Rab and Ryan.
84	24	"Consolevania BOS"	31 January 2022	38'05"
Reviews: The Gunk (Ryan), The Forgotten City (Rab), About An Elf and pinball games (Ryan), Sturmwind EX (Rab), Nobody Saves the World (Ryan). Sketches: The Big Consolevania Announcement: 18 February.

=== Series 9 (2022-) ===
No. overall	No. in series	Title	Original release date	Running time
85	1	"How To Consolevania"	28 February 2022	67'13"
Reviews: Lonely Mountains: Downhill (Rab), OlliOlli World (Ryan). Gaming: Demo Moore (demos of Vampire Survivors, Inscryption, Sifu, Triangle Strategy). Sketches: How To Make Consolevania (with Ryan), MasterClass on making Consolevania (with Rab). Notes: This episode aired ten days after, and follows up on, the announcement on 18 February 2022 that Rab and Ryan were relinquishing all rights to the name and format of Consolevania.
86	2	"fomovania"	31 March 2022	32'27"
Reviews: Gran Turismo 7 (Rab), Tunic (Ryan), Elden Ring (Ryan). Gaming: Rab on missing out on gaming experiences.
87	3	"The Gambler"	30 April 2022	37'24"
Reviews: Milo and the Magpies (Ryan), Song in the Smoke (Ryan), Triangle Strategy (Rab), Elden Ring, part 2 (Ryan). Gaming: Switch Ditch Special: blindboxes (multiple segments). Notes: One of the creators of Song in the Smoke, Carl Wilson, appeared in the Ask Kenny segment of episode 2.7.
88	4	"Consolevanias"	31 May 2022	39'46"
Reviews: Hero's Hour (Ryan), Inside (Rab). Gaming: Ryan on Schtoopot's episode of Consolevania and gaming memories, Rab's reaction video on the Evercade EXP, Ryan on looking forward (previews of Codename: Wandering Sword, the Playdate and Mothmen 1966), the Amiga 500 Mini with Rab, Ryan and Gerry (feat. The Chaos Engine, Kick Off 2, Super Cars II). Notes: First appearance of Gerry McLaughlin since episode 7.6.
89	5	"Consolevania 9.5"	30 June 2022	35'15"
Reviews: The House of the Dead Remake (Rab), Lake (Ryan). Gaming: Switch round-up with Rab (feat. KeyWe, Terra Lander, Terra Lander 2, Terra Bomber, Tormented Souls), Musa Demo (Ryan reviews demos of Fabular, Gunsmith Simulator, Unwording, Sex with Hitler, Loopmancer, Queer Man Peering Into A Rock Pool.jpg), Rab recaps Nintendo Direct, Ryan on Reality Level. Sketches: Ryan on Reality Level: saving money on games (feat. Command & Conquer: Red Alert 2, Ellen Whitaker: the Horse Mystery) and E3 reminiscences.
90	6	"Sick and Broken"	31 July 2022	44'04"
Reviews: Vampire Survivors (Rab), Wildermyth (Ryan), Stray (Ryan). Gaming: The Roundup (Ryan on The Alien Cube, Eyes in the Dark: the Curious Case of one Victoria Bloom, and PowerWash Simulator), Klonoa Phantasy Reverie Series and Live A Live, The Switch Ditch (feat. Rogue Heroes: Ruins of Tasos, Live A Live, Yurukill, Cupid Parasite, White Night, AI: The Somnium Files – Nirvana Initiative collector's edition, Ender Lilies: Quietus of the Knights collector's edition, Xenoblade Chronicles 3), Rab on PCs breaking and the Steam Deck.
91	7	"The Long and Short of It"	31 August 2022	42'04"
Reviews: Who's Lila? (Ryan), Immortality (Rab), Cult of the Lamb (Ryan). Gaming: The Roundup (Ryan on One Dreamer (video game), Lethal Honor: Order of the Apocalypse, Lovecraft's Untold Stories 2, The Dig). Sketches: Brian's Pals. Notes: Rab's review of Immortality was published on the Consolevania Youtube channel on 30 August 2022, the day before the full episode was released to supporters.
92	8	"Staying In and Going Out"	30 September 2022	35'47"
Reviews: Tinykin (Ryan), NBA 2K23 (Rab), Return to Monkey Island (Rab), Roadwarden (Ryan), Super Bullet Break (Rab). Gaming: Ryan on Grand Theft Auto VI, The Roundup (Ryan on Doko Roko, DREDGE, Scorn, Trombone Champ).
93	9	"9.9.9"	31 October 2022	37'50"
Reviews: Penguin Wars (Rab), Victoria 3 (Ryan), The Diofield Chronicle (Rab). Gaming: Scary Halloween Games with Ryan (Scorn, Signalis, Madison, Saturnalia), Demo Nic Suggestions (Ryan on demos of Hell Is Others, Super People, Rytmos, The Last Hero of Nostalgaia, Knuckle Sandwich), Rab's Top 5 scariest videogame adverts of all time.
94	10	"9.10"	30 November 2022	33'43"
Reviews: Shatter (Switch version) (Rab), Bayonetta 3 (Ryan), Evil West and Pentiment (Ryan), Harvestella (Rab), Sonic Frontiers (Ryan). Gaming: Switch Ditch (Card Shark, Loop Hero, Cthulhu Saves Christmas, Death's Door, Atari 50, Madison, plus an existential crisis (steelbook edition)).
95	11	"CVNYE"	31 December 2022	35'21"
Reviews: Atari 50 (Ryan). Gaming: The Florence family's Christmas games (feat. the Arcade1Up Pac-Man cabinet). Sketches: Rab and Ryan (on the Queen, wee microphones, and 2022), Ryan on whizkids, Robert and Ryan's Reaction Video to 2022.
96	12	"Consolevania 9.12"	31 January 2023	29'12"
Reviews: Catoise (feat. darts games) (Ryan), The Quarry (Rab). Gaming: Hot games of 2023 with Ryan (feat. A Highland Song, Street Fighter 6, Cocoon, Starfield, El Paso, Elsewhere, Planet of Lana, Knuckle Sandwich, The Legend of Zelda: Tears of the Kingdom, Sea of Stars, The Plucky Squire, Two Falls (Nishu Takuatshina), The Big Catch, Season: A Letter to the Future). Sketches: Rab in NYC, Rab plays Goldeneye, Ryan on AI and VR.
97	13	"Consolevania 9.13"	28 February 2023	38'42"
Reviews: They Always Run (Rab), The Last of Us (TV series) (Ryan), Theatrhythm Final Bar Line (Rab). Gaming: The kill room collapse / Rab's JRPG resolution (feat. Thousand Arms and Trails from Zero), Demos with Ryan (Humanity, Sea of Stars, Bleak Sword DX, A Sister's Journey, Planet of Lana). Sketches Art. by Ryan.
98	14	"Consolevania: Sticks and Stones"	31 March 2023	36'10"
Reviews: The Resi 4 remake (Rab, Ryan, Gerry), Tetsudō Nippon! Real Pro Tokkyū Sōkō! Nagoya Tetsudō-hen (Rab). Gaming: Games Out This Month (March?) with Ryan (feat. Bayonetta Origins: Cereza and the Lost Demon, Have A Nice Death, Figment 2, Peaky Blinders: The King's Ransom, Storyteller); Sketches: Ryan and Gerry play Shо̄bu, Defending...Attacking...: football management sims with Ryan (feat. Championship Manager 93/94 and Football Manager 2023), Rab loves trains. Notes: Gerry McLaughlin appears in this episode.
99	15	"Consolevania Springwatch"	30 April 2023	32'48"
Reviews: Pac-Man Museum + (Rab). Gaming: Ryan's PC upgrade (feat. Red Dead Redemption 2, The Witcher 3, Life of Black Tiger, Dexter), visual novels with Ryan (feat. Tron: Identity, Paranormasight: The Seven Mysteries of Honjo), More JRPGs with Rab (feat. Ys Origin, Labyrinth of Zangetsu). Sketches: The weans play Pac-Man (several segments).
100	16	"Consolevania - Life Is A Mystery"	31 May 2023	36'19"
Reviews: Star Wars Jedi: Survivor (Ryan), Home Sweet Home (Rab), Pocky & Rocky Reshrined (Rab), The Super Mario Bros. Movie (moderated by Rab), Warhammer 40,000: Boltgun (Rab), The Legend of Zelda: Tears of the Kingdom (Ryan). Gaming: PlayStation Cruisers with Ryan (feat. previews of Sword of the Sea, The Talos Principle 2, Neva, Final Fantasy XVI, Revenant Hill, Street Fighter 6, the Project Q, Ultros, Dragon's Dogma 2, Marvel's Spider-Man 2), Games Ryan's looking forward to (feat. Warhammer 40,000: Boltgun, Cassette Beasts, Star Trek: Resurgence), Rab didn't love Breath of the Wild.
101	17	"Consolevania Junebug"	30 June 2023	34'52"
Reviews: Street Fighter 6, briefly (Rab), Tears of the Kingdom, again (Ryan), Very Very Valet (Rab), Aaero (Rab), Killer Frequency (Rab). Gaming: Ryan's June gaming round-up (feat. Street Fighter 6, Final Fantasy XVI, Diablo IV, Aliens: Dark Descent, Dordogne, The Greyhill Incident), Rab's 3DO collection. Sketches: Ryan's returning to Twitch.
102	18	"Consolevania Fort Boyard Special"	31 July 2023	38'20"
Reviews: Oxenfree II: Lost Signals b/w Gunsmith Simulator (Ryan), Atelier Marie Remake (Rab), Fort Boyard 2022 world exclusive review (Rab). Gaming: What Rab's been playing (Dredge, Fatal Frame: Maiden of Black Water, Yuppie Psycho, demos with Ryan (Little Kitty, Big City, Pikmin 4, Sticky Business. Stray Gods: The Roleplaying Musical, Viewfinder). Sketches: Ryan's retro deep dive.
103	19	"Consolevania Echoes"	31 August 2023	37'46"
Reviews: The Texas Chain Saw Massacre (Rab). Gaming: Ryan's review of Gamescom 2023 feat. Geoff Keighley and his Lovely Ladies (previews of Bulletstorm VR, Fat Loser Finally Finds A Toilet, Marvel Snap, My Mom's A Douche, Killing Floor 3, Post Trauma, Tunnel B1 2, Zenless Zone Zero, Klonker 5, Starfield, Peter's Giant Arm, Tekken 8, Bin Man Simulator 9, Under the Waves, Mario And Sonic Dispute Climate Science, Armored Core VI: Fires of Rubicon, Song of the Unwiped Bum, Alan Wake II, Fat Roll University, Crimson Desert), The Green Eyed Gordon (Ryan on gaming envy, plus a heartbreaking story of loss). Sketches: Rab and Ryan in NQ64 Glasgow.
104	20	"Consolevania - Void"	30 September 2023	38'23"
Reviews: Baldur's Gate 3 (Ryan), Moto Racer 2044 Game Simulator (Rab), The Legend of Nayuta: Boundless Trails (Rab), Post Void (Rab). Gaming: New Releases with Ryan (Bomb Rush Cyberfunk, Cyberpunk 2077: Phantom Liberty, F-Zero 99, Lies of P. Mortal Kombat 1, Starfield), Ryan's videogame diary for September 2023 (Baldur's Gate 3, Animal Crossing: New Horizons, Baten Kaitos I & II HD Remaster, Nour: Play with Your Food, Amiga emulation tips, Fae Farm).
105	21	"Consoween"	31 October 2023	41'45"
Reviews: A Monster's Expedition, A Good Snowman Is Hard To Build, Sokobond (Rab), the Analogue Pocket portable handheld (Rab), You Will Die Here Tonight and RoboCop: Rogue City (Ryan), Fate/Samurai Remnant (Rab). Gaming: Ryan's horror game round-up (feat. Ad Infinitum, The Outlast Trials, Forgive Me Father 2, Dracula: Dark Reign, Murder Is Game Over, Carnival Hunt, Daymare: 1994 Sandcastle, Demonologist, Psycho Fear, Alan Wake 2, plus Super Mario Bros. Wonder), horror games on the Amiga with Ryan (feat. Alien Breed, Beast Busters, Night Walk, Nightbreed, Fright Night, Personal Nightmare, Waxworks, Inner Demons.
