= One Dreamer =

One Dreamer may refer to:

- One Dreamer (horse), a racehorse born in 1988
- One Dreamer (video game), a 2022 video game
