= Matt Kempke =

German author and game designer (born 1980)

Matthias Kempke
- Born: 1980 (age 45–46); Hamburg, Germany
- Occupation: Game designer

Matthias Kempke (born 1980) is a German author and game designer. He is best known for his work at Daedalic Entertainment.

== Life and career ==
Matthias Kempke was born in 1980, in Hamburg, Germany and grew up there. He studied Japanology and African studies at the University of Leipzig.

Kempke made and released two point-and-click adventure games during his studies, What Makes You Tick? in 2007, and What Makes You Tick: A Stitch in Time in 2010.

Between 2011 and 2018, Matthias Kempke was a game director at the Germany video game studio, Daedalic Entertainment, where he participated in the development of numerous projects.

In 2020, he developed an interactive radio play for the Amazon Echo for a Hamburg agency . In the same year, he published two novels for children and young people with Riva Verlag.

In 2024, Matt Kempke, Anton Licht and Laura Mazgaj have founded a new game studio called Sudden Forest. Based in Berlin, Sudden Forest is currently working on its debut game Summer on Tidewind.

== Works ==
=== Video games ===
- What Makes You Tick? (2007)
- What Makes You Tick: A Stitch In Time (2010)
- The Night of the Rabbit (2013)
- Silence (2016)
- Ken Follett's The Pillars of the Earth (2017)
- Leisure Suit Larry: Wet Dreams Dry Twice (2020)
- Fall of Porcupine (2023)
- Ad Infinitum (2023)

=== Literature ===
- Standart Skill: Voll verglitcht! (2020)
- Mexify: Das Hotel im Nirgendwo (2020)
- Benx Comic Quest (2024)

== Awards and recognition ==
The works of Matthias Kempke have received numerous awards.

In 2014, The Night of the Rabbit won the "Best Game World" award at Austrian Game Award.

In 2018, The Pillars of the Earth won the "Prix Historia" award from Historia magazine.

In 2023, Fall of Porcupine won the "Best Story" award at Deutscher Entwicklerpreis.

In 2024, Ad Infinitum won the "Best Story", "Best Audio Design", "Best Debut" awards at Deutscher Computerspielpreis.
