= Fall of Porcupine =

- Developer: Critical Rabbit
- Publisher: Assemble Entertainment
- Director: Sebastian Hesse
- Producer: Florian Köster
- Designer: Sebastian Hesse
- Programmers: Christian Thielsch; Gordon Vogel; Lukas Eckart; Raviv Elon
- Artist: Paul Kolvenbach
- Writers: Sebastian Hesse; Matthias Kempke
- Composer: Pinsel
- Engine: Unity
- Platforms: Nintendo Switch; PlayStation 4; PlayStation 5; Windows; Xbox One; Xbox Series X/S
- Release: WW: June 15, 2023
- Genre: Adventure
- Mode: Single-player

Fall of Porcupine is an adventure video game developed by Critical Rabbit. Players control a young physician in a new town. Assemble Entertainment published it for Windows, PlayStation 4 and 5, Xbox One and Series X/S, and Switch in June 2023.

== Gameplay ==
Players control Finley, a young physician who has recently moved to the small town Porcupine, whose citizens are anthropomorphized animals. The hospital where Finley works has suffered an accident recently, and it has become very busy recently. Fall of Porcupine uses 2D art and is a side-scrolling adventure game. Players interact with Finley's patients mostly through minigames, including rhythm, matching and word games. There is also turn-based combat. Finley's performance at the hospital is graded each day. When interacting with Finley's friends and coworkers, dialogue choices can be chosen.

== Plot ==
Finley is a junior doctor who recently moved to the small town of Porcupine and is working at the St. Ursula Hospital. He returns to work from a break caused by an accident, in which he was injured by falling boxes while searching for an elderly patient, Mr. Arndes, on the hospital's abandoned 5th floor. He occasionally spends time with his new friends, a florist named Pina, who also makes memorial figurines for all deceased residents and leaves them in the nearby Glowmilk Woods, a nurse named Karl, and another junior doctor named Mia, while also occasionally suffering from nightmares.

One day, a thunderstorm causes damage to the hospital, and personnel is asked to not give any interviews to the press by the hospital's accountant, Roman Heidrich. A later skirmish in the local tavern between Karl and a local man named Ralph causes Karl to be suspended from his job, and warnings are issued to Finley and Mia.

Working a night shift during the town's Hibernation Festival, which includes a cooking competition, Finley witnesses the death of a patient he was assigned to, Irma DiCalma. He is reassured that he carries no blame for her death, but while attending her funeral at the tavern he is being accused by Ralph of causing her death and is politely asked by Giuliano, the tavern owner and Irma's son, to leave, in order to not cause any further conflicts.

The next day, locals go to protest in front of the hospital, accusing the personnel of corruption and negligence. The chief physician of the hospital, Dr. Theobald, promises to talk to the protestors, but disappears. Mr. Arndes is also brought back to the hospital from a rehab clinic and reveals to Finley that during the accident on the 5th floor he, just like Finley, saw boxes and papers on one of the beds, which were later moved. Finley, Mia and Karl visit the hospital archives to find more information about the missing papers, but are interrupted by a sudden outbreak of a gastrointestinal disease among the protesters, which overwhelms the hospital, and resume working.

With all of the hospital's wards overwhelmed, Finley suggests to his supervisor Dr. Krokowski that they use the abandoned 5th floor, although upon turning the power on there, the hospital experiences a blackout. Dr. Theobald returns and explains his situation to Dr. Krokowski, saying that he was blackmailed by Mr. Heidrich, who embezzled the hospital's funds, and was trying to leave town but could not leave the hospital during an emergency. A fire starts on the 5th floor, and the hospital is evacuated; everybody leaves save for Dr. Theobald, who checks the hospital for anymore personnel or patients, and later dies in the fire. Everybody who was in the hospital is delivered with ambulances to the school gym, where doctors are hastily treating patients. As the night passes, Finley walks out and joins Karl and Mia as they look at the hospital's charred ruins. The end titles show that Mr. Heidrich was arrested; a scene after the titles shows Finley and Pina put a stethoscope on a memorial figurine to Dr. Theobald.

== Development ==
Developer Critical Rabbit, who is based in Cologne, Germany, was previously known as Buntspecht Games. Assemble Entertainment published Fall of Porcupine for Windows, PlayStation 4 and 5, Xbox One and Series X/S, and Switch on June 15, 2023.

== Reception ==
Reception

Aggregate scores
Aggregator	Score
Metacritic	(PC) 72/100
OpenCritic	68/100; 64% Critics Recommend

Review scores
Publication	Score
Hardcore Gamer	3.5/5
Nintendo Life	5/10

The Windows version of Fall of Porcupine received "mixed or average" reviews from critics, according to the review aggregation website Metacritic. Multiple reviews compared it to Night in the Woods. Hardcore Gamer said it needs patches to resolve buggy or poorly structured content, but they recommended it for its story. Nintendo Life said it does not live up to its potential and recommended Night in the Woods, Stardew Valley, and other cozy games instead. GamesRadar said it "does a great job of hooking you in" and said they enjoyed spending time with Finley.
