= The Night of the Rabbit =

2013 video game

- Developer: Daedalic Entertainment
- Publisher: Daedalic Entertainment
- Director: Matthias Kempke
- Producer: Matthias Mangelsdorf
- Designer: Matthias Kempke
- Artists: Olga Andriyenko; Martin Kailuweit; Gunnar Bergmann
- Writers: Matthias Kempke; Sebastian Kempke
- Composer: Tilo Alpermann
- Platforms: Microsoft Windows, OS X, Nintendo Switch, Linux, PlayStation 4, PlayStation 5, Xbox One, Xbox Series X/S
- Release: Microsoft Windows, OS X 28 May 2013; Nintendo Switch; 8 May 2024; Linux; 24 December 2024; PlayStation 4, PlayStation 5, Xbox One, Xbox Series X/S; 4 June 2025
- Genre: Point-and-click adventure
- Mode: Single-player

The Night of the Rabbit is a point-and-click adventure video game developed and published by Daedalic Entertainment for Microsoft Windows, OS X, Nintendo Switch, Linux, PlayStation 4, PlayStation 5, Xbox One and Xbox Series X/S.

== Synopsis ==
On the last days of summer vacation, 12-year old aspiring magician Jerry Hazelnut finds a formula to create a "carrot flame". After he puts the ingredients together, a traveling case appears out from nowhere. Inside the case is a wand, a magic hat and an anthropomorphized albino rabbit wearing a coat. The rabbit introduces himself as the Marquis de Hoto. He explains that the world has many parallel universes. The roots of very old trees are connected to each other deep in the ground and also connect with the ones in the parallel universes. The Marquis de Hoto is a "Treewalker" and uses a magic spell to travel between these universes. Furthermore, inside each universe there lies invisible magic which can be revealed by using a special hollow coin that Jerry owns, which Marquis de Hoto enchants.

The Marquis de Hoto offers Jerry a chance to become his apprentice in order to become a magician. Jerry needs to follow a long term course, although the rabbit claims Jerry will be home again before dinner. Jerry agrees and travels with Marquis de Hoto to a beautiful fairy-tale looking parallel universe. They end up in the town of Mousewood which is inhabited by talking woodland animals. Through the Marquis and the Magician of Mousewood, Jerry learns about "portal trees" and travels to different worlds to learn four spells in order to become a true Treewalker, all the while helping the residents of Mousewood. During this time, he sees a recurring image of a person he does not recognize, but who appears to know him.

However, Jerry discovers this world is about to be attacked by an evil magician named Zaroff. Zaroff has already conquered many parallel universes through a spell by using four cursed nails. After Jerry completes his training, the Marquis disappears, and Jerry returns home to find many years have passed; his home is abandoned and his mother long gone. Determined to break the curse, Jerry returns to Mousewood and finds the residents under Zaroff's influence. He captures four lizards posing as humans who are Zaroff's accomplices, and looks for the clearing of the "First Tree" wherein Zaroff lies. Trapped in-between worlds, he makes another "carrot flame" which summons forth a masked magician who shows Jerry the way. He also learns his father has been removed from his world and all memories of him erased.

Jerry confronts Zaroff, who traps him on his stage and forces him through twisted plays of the portal worlds. Jerry conquers them and removes the nails, and uses them to defeat Zaroff. The Magician of Mousewood explains his backstory: Zaroff was the last apprentice of the Marquis de Hoto, who both had grown corrupted by darkness. In order to combat Zaroff's rise, the First Tree sent out a memory of the Marquis before his corruption in order to train a new apprentice. However, when the memory of the Marquis entered Jerry's world, something had to go; therefore his father was banished to the space in-between worlds and memories of him forgotten. The memory of the Marquis is forced to stay behind at the First Tree, and the two promise never to forget one another.

Jerry returns to Mousewood to celebrate the completion of his training before returning home in time for dinner with his father restored to his world. The Magician of Mousewood reveals he had been keeping the real Marquis de Hoto, the masked magician, prisoner. However, the real Marquis states his motto: "Nothing is impossible", hinting that he might have found a way to escape.

== Gameplay ==
The game is based upon classic principles of point-and-click-adventure games.

The player controls Jerry by using a computer mouse. Conversations with other characters are held and various objects must be put into the inventory. These objects can be used on their own or combined in order to solve puzzles. Jerry has a special hollow coin which can be used to reveal the hidden magic. To use the hollow coin, the spacebar or middle mouse button must be pressed, which will allow Jerry to find clickable objects.

In addition, there are several collectibles, such as stickers and audiobooks, that can be found in order to unlock achievements. The game also features a quartets card mini-game that can be played at any time.

== Reception ==
Reception

Aggregate score
Aggregator	Score
Metacritic	75/100

Review scores
Publication	Score
4Players	67%
Adventure Gamers	4/5
Destructoid	7.5/10
GameStar	71/100
Hardcore Gamer	3.5/5
IGN	7.9/10
PC Games (DE)	68%
Gameswelt	9.0/10

The Night of the Rabbit received "generally favorable" reviews, according to review aggregator Metacritic.
