= Ad Infinitum (video game) =

- Developer: Hekate
- Publisher: Nacon
- Directors: Lukas Deuschel; Thomas Lenz
- Producer: Laure Bruyère
- Designers: Alexander Doege; Dennis Radtke; Thijs Roem; Kelton Weigelt-Macfarlane
- Programmer: Ivan Feklistov
- Artist: Thomas Lenz
- Writer: Matthias Kempke
- Composer: Lukas Deuschel
- Engine: Unreal Engine
- Platforms: PlayStation 5; Windows; Xbox Series X/S
- Release: 14 September 2023
- Genre: Survival horror
- Mode: Single-player

Ad Infinitum is a 2023 survival horror video game developed by Hekate and published by Nacon. It is set during World War I and was released for PlayStation 5, Windows, and Xbox Series X/S on 14 September 2023.

== Gameplay ==
Players control a German soldier trying to come to terms with the horror of trench warfare and atrocities during World War I. The setting shifts to his family's mansion and a French town occasionally, representing his mental instability. Ad Infinitum is a survival horror game. Players must solve puzzles and avoid monsters, some of which represent the soldier's experiences during the war. Escaping from monsters involves tapping controls. If they fail to escape, they return to a checkpoint. It is played from a first-person perspective.

== Plot ==
The game takes place from the perspective of Paul von Schmidt, a young German veteran who returned from the trenches in France after the end of The Great War. Paul and his brother Johannes were raised by their disabled father Karl (who was a wartime contributor) and their worrisome mother Madelein, with Karl's father Lothar living with them for a time. Lothar was a former military general, and forced his corrupt views on the glories of military life on Karl during his upbringing and upon Paul before his death; this caused friction in the family, as Madelein was opposed to this, causing tension between her and Karl, and she rarely even acknowledged Paul due to fearing that he would become like his grandfather. Johannes was later rejected by Karl after the discovery that he had an illicit affair with a man, and both were pressured into joining the war effort by him.

On the battlefield, Paul became a Lieutenant after Karl had some strings pulled, and Paul proved an incompetent leader as his immature and unrealistic views worsened the conditions for his company, leading many to starve. Later on, Johannes, realizing the futility of the war, shoots Paul in the foot to take him out of duty and keep him from being killed. During an attack, Johannes is heavily injured, losing his left arm and eye, with barbed wire tearing his face open as well; Paul guiltily leaves him behind in the chaos, and both are separately taken by French forces as POWs. After the war's end, both are sent back home, with Karl horrified by what he forced his sons into and the hysterical Madelein continuing to ignore Paul while in denial of Johannes' survival, seeing him as a "cuckoo" that is hidden away in the attic and neglected: the scarred, traumatized Johannes becomes increasingly alien to Paul, who begins to develop a warped view of his family overall.

The game itself takes place mostly in Paul's mind, as he struggles to come to terms with his life, actions and traumatizing experiences. While he does explore his family's manor to recall memories of his upbringing, he slips into a recreation of the war trenches he served in. In different locations within both worlds, he struggles with memories and visions of his family members.

While exploring the trenches, he encounters various monsters of Hunger, blind, ravenous creatures that listen and attack. He encounters The Officer, a harsh, commanding man who was blinded in the crashing of his plane and was approached by monsters before they find safety in the command bunker. He commands Paul to search for morphine to soothe his pain, and Paul searches the remains of a French town, getting inside the church only to encounter a warped, female monster named Despair. After a chase, Paul finds a lot with a large tree she circles, surrounded by speakers with records of harsh military music or soothing songs that his mother loved. Paul can choose to use the military music to drive Despair off to destroy the tree, to which he then sends her spiraling off a cliff; if he chooses the soothing music, Despair is pacified enough for him to remove a thorn from her heart, and she disappears when she appears at peace, to which Paul then awakens from a dream.

In the second chapter, Paul returns to the trenches, where The Officer is suspicious of his absence, demanding proof of his loyalty. Journeying near a toxic gas-filled area, Paul hides from a flaming centaur-like monster named Rage. After Paul opens gas lines with the aid of a mask, Rage is destroyed when Paul gets it to charge into the munitions depot, triggering an explosion; Paul proves himself to The Officer by returning with the monster's head. The Officer informs him of a saboteur in the munitions factory, and sends Paul to correct the issue. Paul enters and restores the factory, but is impeded by a four-armed, mechanically-grafted monster named Corruption. Paul must restore the gas lines, choosing either to restore a toxic gas or a sedative one. If Paul chooses the toxic gas, he then kills and beheads Corruption; if he uses the sedative gas, Corruption is pacified and disappears as Paul wakes from his dream.

In the last chapter, Paul wakes in a hospital bunker, which he escapes after avoiding the monsters of Mayhem, figures made from various materials, namely mutilated bodies with prosthetic limbs. He returns to meet The Officer, who reports an airborne enemy, tasking him with destroying it, stating that it fears light. After retrieving a fuse for the searchlight, Paul encounters the monster the Officer speaks of: Pain, a deformed humanoid with avian characteristics. During his pursuit, Pain grabs him and lifts him up into the dark sky; Paul suddenly finds himself in a cavernous area reminiscent of his home's attic where his brother resided in. At the top, Paul enters the nest of Pain, and Paul faces him by getting him to dive into the three support beams. If Paul raises the barbed cages for Pain to crash into, Pain struggles with Paul, who blinds him with his light and makes him crash into a searchlight, where Paul kills him by hacking his face; if Paul lowers the cages, making Pain smash into and break the beams, the roof overhead collapses down onto Paul - seeing Paul, Pain then instead turns towards the light shining down on him, disappearing as Paul wakes up once again.

The game's ending depends on if Paul either kills or spares Despair, Corruption and Pain, monsters correlating with his mother, father and brother respectively. If he fails to kill or save at least one of the monsters, he is chastised by The Officer, who tells him "there's no such thing as half a victory" before shooting him; Paul, having fallen into madness, wakes up in an asylum, where he now permanently sees his family as monsters. If Paul kills all three monsters, it is revealed that all of Paul's family is dead, with Johannes dying from neglectful malnutrition and the depressed Madelein killing Karl before throwing herself down a well (some dialogue hints that Paul himself may have killed his family, seeing them as weaknesses that needed to be culled); The Officer congratulates Paul by giving him an Iron Cross, saying that the battlefield is his home now. If Paul saves all three monsters, he sees that his mother has risen above her despair to embrace and accept both her sons, his father has let go of his foolish pride and worked to close his war factories, and Johannes tells him through a painting that his disfigurements are not his fault. Paul returns to the battlefield, following Johannes' trail from the game's introduction to find him suffering on the wire. The Officer appears and furiously berates him for both not dying with his company as well as showing mercy to his "enemies"; Paul then hugs The Officer, finally learning to forgive himself, as The Officer is the dark interior reflection of him. Paul then finds himself at home, emerging from his room to meet with his family, who quietly embrace each other.

== Reception ==
Reception

Aggregate score
Aggregator	Score
Metacritic	(PC) 68/100 (PS5) 70/100 (XSXS) 75/100

Review scores
Publication	Score
PC Games (DE)	8/10
Push Square	6/10
Shacknews	6/10
CGMagazine	7/10
Horrorfuel	9.5/10

Ad Infinitum received "mixed or average" reviews, according to review aggregator website Metacritic. GamingBolt praised what they felt was "a unique setting and premise" but said the horror elements needed more work. Push Square enjoyed the parts involving trench warfare, which they called "unique and compelling", but they found the haunted mansion aspects to be "a knockoff of better titles". CGMagazine and Shacknews praised the setting's eerie atmosphere and inventive creature design but criticized its disjointed story, shallow character development, and reliance on stale walking simulator mechanics.
