= Queer Man Peering Into A Rock Pool.jpg =

2022 video game

- Steam header art
- Developer: Fuzzy Ghost
- Platforms: Windows, MacOS
- Release: 13 July 2022
- Genre: Adventure
- Mode: Single-player

Queer Man Peering Into A Rock Pool.jpg is a video game developed by Fuzzy Ghost, the studio of Sydney-based independent developers Pete Foley and Scott Ford. Described as a "joyful, strange experience in which a middle-aged queer man toddles around a strange island", the game is a narrative adventure game and walking simulator. The developers conceived of Queer Man Peering Into A Rock Pool as an abstract expression of their personal experiences and sense of location and identity in the Sydney queer community. Upon release, the game received praise from critics for its positive and sentimental tone, with the game receiving an 'Excellence in Emerging Games' award at the 2022 Australian Game Developer Awards and a nomination for the Nuovo Award at the 2023 Independent Games Festival.

== Gameplay ==
A screenshot of gameplay in Queer Man Peering Into A Rock Pool.

Queer Man Peering Into A Rock Pool is a passive and narrative-based adventure game in which the player explores a post-apocalyptic environment as the amnesiac Queer Man. The objective of the game is to assist the Queer Man to piece together his memories about the state of his world and his prior relationship with a man named Darl, through collecting postcards and indistinct digital items called 'chunkies' in the world around him. By bringing 'chunkies' to Admin, an entity based in a hole in the ground that communicates using the titles of .mp3 files, the Queer Man receives items with practical or sentimental value. As players assimilate chunks over several in-game days, the waters of the surrounding environment recede, exposing new areas to be explored.

== Development and release ==
Developer Scott Ford stated that the inspiration for the game arose from a "morning walk routine" established during the COVID-19 pandemic, and the exploration and collection of items in coastal rock pools, leading to the idea to develop a game that encourages "exploring gentle routine and slowness" and "motivates a closer inspection of the world". The decision to "centre on an older queer character" was made to ensure the game's characters "didn't fit any conventional mold or stereotype". The game features several motifs specific to Sydney, with the developers stating their inclusion was "driven by the desire to share moments and feelings of particular places and times in which we'd lived" as a "hyper-specific reflection" of their lived experience in the queer community. Foley and Ford stated that the game was designed with a positive tone and happy ending to subvert negative stereotypes of queer people, with a focus on creating a "high camp, fun and frivolous" tone. From February to December 2023, Queer Man Peering Into A Rock Pool was exhibited at the Powerhouse Museum in Ultimo, Sydney, as part of Absolutely Queer, an exhibition "celebrating contemporary queer creativity" in line with the city's festivities for WorldPride 2023.

== Reception ==
Queer Man Peering Into A Rock Pool received praise from critics for its narrative, tone, and visual design. Writing for Games Hub, Leah Williams praised the game's "brilliant storytelling" and "excellent emotional and physical journey", writing that the game's "surreal" aesthetics complement "the game's narrative, and speak both to the state of the Queer Man's world, and how it reflects his evolving mindset." Charlie Kelly of Checkpoint Gaming praised the game as "unique", highlighting its "charming and interpersonal" tone and "feelings of warm love and a sense of home", and the "niche" and "familiar" attention to detail of the game's inclusion of locations and motifs based in Sydney. Kieron Verbrugge of Press Start described the game as "odd, garish and gleefully camp", praising the "inherently positive energy" of the game's tone and the decision to focus the game on a "lanky and effeminate middle-aged gay man" as an "antithesis to the kind of video game protagonists we're used to". Joel Couture of Indie Games Plus praised the game's setting as a "calming, beautiful place to explore" and the narrative as a "touching story of reminding yourself of the love you felt for someone and hopefully can share with them again".

=== Accolades ===
Queer Man Peering Into A Rock Pool received several industry awards and nominations. The game received the 'Excellence in Emerging Games' award, dedicated for student or early career titles, at the Australian Game Developer Awards in October 2022. The game was also nominated on the shortlist of the 2022 Melbourne Queer Games Festival, and the 'Nuovo Award' at the Independent Games Festival in March 2023.
