= Super Blood Hockey =

2017 video game

- Developer: Loren Lemcke
- Publisher: Loren Lemcke
- Platforms: Microsoft Windows; Nintendo Switch; PlayStation 4 Xbox One
- Release: Microsoft Windows; August 17, 2017; Nintendo Switch; April 26, 2019; PlayStation 4 June 4, 2019; Xbox One; June 7, 2019
- Genre: Sports game
- Modes: Single-player, multiplayer

Super Blood Hockey is an ice hockey fighting video game for Windows. The game was developed and published by Loren Lemcke in 2017. It was available in the Nintendo eShop for the Nintendo Switch in April 2019 with release dates from PlayStation 4 and Xbox One later in the year. The console versions included a new franchise mode, with the PC version receiving this mode as a free update. A limited physical release of the Switch version was released by Premium Edition Games.

== Gameplay ==
Super Blood Hockey mainly focuses on the bloodier and much more violent side of ice hockey. During gameplay, players can freely punch other players on the opposing team and can also, at any time, start hockey fights. Due to the excessive bloody violence and partial nudity, the game was given a "Mature 17+" age rating. It is heavily inspired by the Nintendo Entertainment System game Ice Hockey, reusing many of the same mechanics that were first introduced in the original NES release. The game contains 8 playable countries.

== Reception ==
Nintendo Life awarded Super Blood Hockey a score of 6 out of ten, saying 'Super Blood Hockey is an entertaining sports game, but not necessarily one that will hold your attention for very long.,'
