= Mothmen 1966 =

2022 video game

- Developer: LCG Game Studio
- Publisher: Chorus Worldwide Games
- Platforms: Windows, Mac, Nintendo Switch, Xbox One, Xbox Series, PlayStation 4
- Release: WW: 14 July 2022
- Genre: Visual novel
- Mode: Single-player

Mothmen 1966 is a 2022 video game developed by LCG Game Studio and published by Chorus Worldwide Games. The game is a visual novel title in which players follow the story of three survivors of an invasion of mothmen in a small town. LCG Game Studio developed the title in a short period as part of a series titled Pixel Pulps, inspired by pulp fiction. Upon release, the game received average reviews, with critics praising the writing and presentation, although critiquing its short length and trial and error gameplay.

== Gameplay ==
Gameplay

The game is an interactive fiction title with a branching three-chapter narrative. Each chapter follows the perspective of one of three characters: gas station owner Holt, college student Lee and his girlfriend Victoria, after surviving an invasion of mothmen in their small town. Some sequences include dialog-based puzzles with multiple choice decisions, with wrong choices leading to death and requiring the player to restart the sequence. Other puzzles include interactive prompts completed using dialog, such as moving objects or playing a basic card guessing game.

== Development and release ==
Mothmen 1966 was created by LCG Game Studio, the Argentina-based development team of writer Nico Saraintaris and artist and game designer Fernando Martinez Ruppel. It is one of three titles in Pixel Pulps, a series of horror interactive fiction inspired by pulp fiction, and reflected by the short four-month development cycle and focus on short stories that can "be consumed as a standalone piece but framed in a much larger story". Both developers stated that the impetus for the game came from nostalgia of playing games during their childhood, with Saraintaris citing experiences playing ZX Spectrum titles. In 2024, the game was packaged by Meridem Games with two other titles by the developer, Varney Lake and Bahnsen Knights as part of the Pixel Pulps Collection.

== Reception ==
Reception

Aggregate score
Aggregator	Score
Metacritic	70%

Review scores
Publication	Score
Digitally Downloaded	3.5/5
GamesHub	3/5
Softpedia	4/5

Mothmen 1966 received "mixed or average" reviews, according to review aggregator Metacritic. Eurogamer praised its "weird, playful and unexpected" narrative and a "nifty piece of interactive fiction", later revisiting the game as a "haunting", "heartfelt" and "clever" game and listing it as one of the best games of the year. Jody Macgregor of PC Gamer found the game's narrative and "outstanding" art to be a "real draw" for the game, although he criticized the trial and error gameplay and felt the lack of a chapter select menu limited its replayability.
