= Dusk Diver =

- Developers: WANIN Games, JFI Games
- Publisher: WANIN Games
- Platforms: Microsoft Windows; Nintendo Switch; PlayStation 4
- Release: 23 October 2019
- Genres: Hack and slash, beat 'em up
- Mode: Single-player

Dusk Diver (酉閃町) is a 3D third-person action-adventure beat 'em up video game developed by JFI Games and published by WANIN Games. It was released on October 23, 2019 for Microsoft Windows, Nintendo Switch, and PlayStation 4. A sequel, Dusk Diver 2, was released on February 24, 2022, for Microsoft Windows, Nintendo Switch, PlayStation 4, and PlayStation 5.

== Plot ==
The game's plot revolves around Yang Yumo. One day, she and her friend, Yusha, get lost and find themselves in a twisted version of the city of Ximending. Yumo receives powers and, with other guardian spirits, fights against creatures called Chaos Beasts, trying to keep the boundaries intact between both versions of the city.

== Gameplay ==
The game is an anime-style 3D beat 'em up action game with some light role-playing elements. There are some side quests and exploration of Ximending but the core of the gameplay is the battles against the Chaos Beasts. The combat is fast and combo-heavy, combining light and heavy attacks to chain up combo moves, and summoning Guardians to eliminate all enemies. The battlefields get larger as the game goes on leading to fights against a great number of enemies, Yumo has access to a super mode called D Arms, which can be activated after filling its gauge.

As the player builds up their combo meter, the enemies will drop more health and special ability pickups, encouraging the player to not stop fighting, leading to a very fast-paced combat game.

== Reception ==
Reception

Aggregate scores
Aggregator	Score
Metacritic	64/100
OpenCritic	35% recommend

Review scores
Publication	Score
Nintendo Life	6/10
PlayStation Universe	8/10
RPGamer	3/5

Dusk Diver received "mixed or average" reviews, according to review aggregator Metacritic. Fellow review aggregator OpenCritic assessed that the game received weak approval, being recommended by only 35% of critics.
