= Encodya =

2021 video game

- Developer: Chaosmonger Studio
- Publisher: Assemble Entertainment
- Engine: Unity
- Platforms: Windows, Mac, Linux, Nintendo Switch, PlayStation 4, Xbox One, Xbox Series, Android, iOS
- Release: Windows, Mac, Linux: WW: 26 January 2021; Xbox, PS4, Switch: WW: 5 November 2021; iOS; 31 January 2022
- Genre: Adventure
- Mode: Single-player

Encodya is a 2021 point-and-click graphic adventure game developed by Chaosmonger Studio and published by Assemble Entertainment. The player assumes the role of a young homeless girl, Tina, and her robot, SAM-53, as they explore the cyberpunk city of Neo-Berlin. The game was the first to be created by the studio's lead developer, filmmaker and animator Nicola Piovesan, who based the game on an animation, Robot Will Protect You. Upon release, the game received average reviews.

== Gameplay ==
Encodya is a 3D adventure game played from a third-person perspective. Using a point and click interface, the player interacts with the environment by selecting from a series of verbs, such as "look", "take", "talk" or "pull". Players can switch between the two characters, Tina and SAM-53, with dialog options differing depending on the selected character. The game features two difficulty modes: easy and hard, with the easier mode providing hints and a button to highlight some interactable items.

== Plot ==
In the city of Neo-Berlin, the players assume the role of a young homeless girl, Tina and her robot SAM-53. The city's mayor, Mr. Rumph, aims to hunt down SAM-53 for its memory, implanted by Tina's missing father. Players investigate the city of Neo-Berlin, working to avoid Mr. Rumph's henchmen and uncover clues to the password that unlocks what was hidden inside SAM-53.

== Development and release ==
Encodya was developed by Chaosmonger Studio, a development team led by Italian artist, animator and writer Nicola Piovesan, based in Bologna. Piovesan founded the studio in the 2000s as a collective of freelancers to work on film and animation projects. Encodya followed the creation of an animation, Attack of the Cyber Octopuses, a cyberpunk science-fiction themed animation released in 2017, with Piovesan expressing interest in creating a "bigger project" focused on a "cyberpunk universe". In line with this objective, Encodya was created concurrently alongside an animated short, Robot Will Protect You, released in December 2018, with the game pitched as a stretch goal for the Kickstarter campaign for the animation. Piovesan, who largely programmed the game on his own, used his own non-photorealistic rendering technique in the animation of the short as well as in the game to achieve a hand-drawn look with the environments. A game demo was released in June 2019.

== Reception ==
Reception

Aggregate score
Aggregator	Score
Metacritic	67%

Review scores
Publication	Score
Adventure Gamers	4/5
Pocket Gamer	3.5/5
RPGFan	70%
Shacknews	6/10
Cubed3	6/10

According to review aggregator Metacritic, Encodya received "mixed or average" reviews.
