= RLLMUK =

- Website type: Gaming
- Available in: English
- Owner: Rllmuk Limited
- Website: www.rllmukforum.com
- Commercial: No
- Registration: Free
- Launched: 2003
- Current status: Active

RLLMUK is an internet discussion forum that primarily contains discussion about video games, although many other topics of discussion have developed over the years. It was founded in 2003 by Rob Purnell, in response to the closure of the Edge discussion forums. The initial folder structure, moderator list, and rules were heavily influenced by those on the Edge forums.

The site is considered to be "one of the largest and most varied video games forums" and has a UK and European focus to its postings.

== Incorporation ==
In mid-2009, Rob Purnell stated that he wished to step down from running the server, and sought bids from others to take on the forum. After considering a number of bids, a consortium led by Graham Stock was chosen. This consortium aimed to run the forum as a community-owned website, and set out to raise funds for this to happen.

By March 2010, the community had been registered as an industrial and provident society and had raised sufficient funds to ensure its future for at least two years. Voluntary membership fees continue to cover running costs, and there are annual elections for the committee who manage the forum and fulfil the society requirements.

== Structure ==
The forum runs on Invision Power Board software. While the main focus of the forum has always been around videogaming and there are over 3 million posts on this topic, it also includes a number of folders for non-gaming activities, including film and TV, music, sport, creative arts, health/fitness, trading and a lively off-topic section for members. As is typical of internet discussion forums, there are a number of long-running jokes and occasional meets.

== Yoñlu ==
In 2006, the musician Vinicius Gageiro Marques (signed to the label Luaka Bop) used to frequent RLLMUK under his screen and artist name of Yoñlu. He created a thread name "Thread in which Yoñlu posts some of his songs" where he received feedback and encouragement from fellow users, while hinting his condition and intentions of committing suicide. On one occasion, he said "Quick, someone say something really nice about my songs before I decide to KILL MYSELF". Despite receiving messages of support, and postponing his plans as a result, Marques eventually did not post again and it emerged that he had committed suicide a few weeks later.
