= Yuppie Psycho =

- Developer: Baroque Decay
- Publisher: Neon Doctrine
- Director: Francisco Calvelo
- Designer: Francisco Calvelo
- Programmer: Maxime Caignart
- Artist: Francisco Calvelo
- Writer: Francisco Calvelo
- Composer: Michael "Garoad" Kelly
- Platform: Linux; Microsoft Windows; Xbox One; Xbox Series X and Series S
- Release: April 25, 2019
- Genre: Survival horror

Yuppie Psycho is a 2019 survival horror video game. Developed by Baroque Decay, the game involves Brian Pasternack who is hired at a company and finds himself on task to become a witch hunter, to hunt a witch that has corrupted the company from within.

The game was released to Steam in 2019, and later received an expanded edition on the Switch, Xbox One and PlayStation 4, titled "Yuppie Psycho: Executive Edition".

== Plot ==
The game is about Brian Pasternack, a new employee at one of the world's largest corporations, Sintracorp. Pasternack is concerned it might be a scam but agrees to the job. When arriving, he realizes his job is to become a witch hunter, as a witch has existed within the Sintracorp building for years, corrupting the company from the inside. Pasternack then must uncover the mystery of the witch to stop her reign of terror.

== Gameplay ==
Players control Brian Pasternack as he explores the headquarters of Sintracorp. For most of the game the building’s floors are accessible via elevator, and progress comes from exploring offices, solving environmental and inventory puzzles, talking to coworkers, and following story objectives.

Through various sections of the game, Brian is stalked and assaulted by various creatures, and the player must fend them off or avoid them through various methods, such as stealth. There is no combat system, with only some items found in the game that can be used to stop some enemies if they approach the player. The player has access to a flashlight, which uses batteries, forcing them to be conservative with its usage. The player heals by using various food and drink items which they can either find, or make/cook themselves using appliances in the building's canteen.

Collectables include VHS tapes hidden throughout Sintracorp. They contain short, mostly standalone live-action FMV horror clips and can be played on a VHS deck in Videoclub Misterio, a room on the seventh floor. Separate audio tapes serve as additional easter eggs.

The game does not use a general autosave. Saving requires finding one of the photocopiers scattered throughout the building, using an ink cartridge on it to activate it, and then using a sheet of “witch paper.” Using the copier is framed as “photocopying the soul.” Witch paper and ink are both finite, so saving is a scarce, strategic resource. Only a few story beats include scripted checkpoints.

The game features multiple endings and ending circumstances, depending on choices made by the player. Executive Edition additionally added an alt-story route that pivot's the late game story and gameplay content into an completely different direction than the 'standard', if the player had performed certain pre-requirements.

== Production ==
Gameplay from the Yuppie Psycho, showcasing its retro, top-down, 2D pixel art style and an influence of anime and manga.

Yuppie Psycho was developed by Baroque Decay a team from France and Spain. Prior to developing Yuppie Psycho, the developer Baroque Decay created the game The Count Lucanor which they said focused on developing the game mechanics first that worked in previous attempts at game, and set ourselves the constrains of working only with them. The group began work on Yuppie Psycho next hoping to make something more ambitious in size and narrative. The group decided to apply what they learned from The Count Lucanor and make a game that had an easy to read title, a more empathetic playable character, and identifiable setting. The group discussed various influences of office setting in the game, The Crowd (1928), The Apartment (1960), Brazil (1985), The Matrix (1999), and for the dark humor of films like Gremlins 2 (1990), Hudsucker Proxy (1994) and Joe Versus the Volcano (1990). The developers made Yuppie Psycho into a horror and comedy themed-game, finding it allowed greater freedom for game design the plots rhythm.

Yuppie Psycho was made from a home-made engine. While developed in Spain and France, the game features a retro, top-down, 2D pixel art style showcasing an influence of anime and manga styles. Unlike The Count Lucanor which featured remixes of classical music, the game had music from Michael "Garoad" Kelly who reached out to them for their new project from the beginning. Kelly stated he reached out after playing The Count Lucanor, and was excited to create a game with "a musical atmosphere that would flow well with the tonal shifts of the game—the softer tracks having a subtle layer of unease to them that would naturally transition to eerie and horrific."

== Release ==
Yuppie Psycho was released on April 25, 2019. A free update titled Yuppie Psycho: Executive Edition was described by the team as the "complete" version of the game. It was released in October 2020, the game was updated for free with downloadable content (DLC) and released fully on Nintendo Switch, adding three more hours of gameplay, plus some new scenarios and alternate endings. Unlike The Count Lucanor, the team developed the ports of Yuppie Psycho themselves. Much of the material created for it was from reactions from the fanbase who wanted to see more of the character of Mr. Devil and delved deeper into the history of the Sintra family.

The game was published by Neon Doctrine, which the developers felt helped them reach Asian markets for the game, particularly with the anime-styled graphics and Asian folklore elements. The developers noted that due to Korean streamers playing the game at launch, it became featured on Twitch front page helped spread word of mouth for it. The game sold the most in North American markets, primarily the United States.

The game was initially planned to be released on PlayStation 4 and Xbox One which Baroque Decay stated that their research led to not much interest in those systems, and decided to release it on the Nintendo Switch first to see how it goes. The game was later released for the Xbox One, Xbox Series X on November 3, 2022. It was released on PlayStation 4 on January 11, 2023.

== Reception ==
Reception

Aggregate score
Aggregator	Score
Metacritic	81/100

Review scores
Publication	Score
Adventure Gamers	4.5/5
CGMagazine	8/10
GameRevolution	8/10
IGN Japan	7.2/10
IGN Spain	8/10

Yuppie Psycho received a score of 81/100 on review aggregate site Metacritic, indicating "generally favorable reviews". Danielle Riendeau of Vice praised the game's humour stating it was "very funny in its moment to moment" while finding that "not every story beat worked for me, though I found it mostly delightfully campy." and found themselves compelled to see it to the end. Kevin Lynn of Adventure Gamers praised the games satisfying puzzles and survival horror gameplay, and its amusing story, while noting that some of the stealth and survival mechanics were relatively shallow. A review from IGN Japan applauded the game's hybrid of horror and black comedy, but failed to create the tension that the Resident Evil series had, and that it failed to live up to theme's surviving the corporate world towards the end of the game.
