= One Dreamer (video game) =

2022 video game

- Steam header art
- Developer: F2House
- Designer: Gareth Ffoulkes
- Composer: Ben Yusuf Quinn
- Engine: Unity
- Platforms: Windows, Linux, macOS
- Release: 9 September 2022
- Genres: Adventure, Puzzle
- Mode: Single-player

One Dreamer is a video game developed by independent developer F2House in 2022. Described as a "narrative-driven" game, One Dreamer is an adventure game featuring sections in which players solve puzzles using code. The game was designed by an Australian team based in Darwin led by Gareth Ffoulkes, who worked on the game over a seven-year period. Upon release, One Dreamer received praise from critics for its emotional and affecting approach to storytelling, and its novel code-based puzzle gameplay.

== Gameplay ==
A screenshot of gameplay in One Dreamer, depicting the user interface for editing code

One Dreamer is a narrative-based adventure game featuring sections in which players solve puzzles using code. The player is Frank, is an independent game developer who previously published a successful multiplayer game, PROXYlife, that is now reaching the end of its release cycle, with players abandoning the game. Frank is also $5000 in debt to an online cloud service, LUX. The game is structured into two sections of gameplay. During the day, Frank is working freelance on unfulfilling tasks for major studio games to pay off the debt, such as fixing codes and implementing loot boxes. At night, Frank seeks inspiration for his own dream game that he has been working on with a former colleague, Luna, with his lucid dreaming blurring the lines between reality and imagination. In puzzle sections of gameplay, players manipulate a simplified version of code based on C#. In daytime sections, players use a computer to select various freelance tasks to complete to program the code of fictional products, and during nighttime sections, code is used to manipulate the world in Frank's dream state. This includes manipulating boolean statements such as 'true' or 'false', to more complex actions such as changing the interoperable variables of objects to produce the desired result.

== Development and release ==
One Dreamer was created by Australian developer Gareth Ffoulkes, who worked on the game with a small team of friends based in Darwin. Ffoulkes stated the game's narrative was a "personal story" with input from team members, although many of the themes of being a video game developer were not autobiographical. Ffoulkes stated that he was inspired by story-driven, cinematic games, including The Last of Us, and the use of different gameplay modes to represent awake and dream states in Catherine. Ffoulkes crowdfunded release of the game on Kickstarter in 2015, with a protracted development cycle of seven years. Ffoulkes attributed the long development time to an open-ended creative process, with the initial approach of developing ideas "without getting feedback or in-depth planning" leading to "feature creep" requiring revisions to the game. Following several delays, in 2020, One Dreamer was announced to be nearing completion, with the game released in September 2022.

== Reception ==
One Dreamer received positive reception from video game reviewers. Critics praised One Dreamer for its writing and themes, particularly in its affecting representation of the personal impact of the video game development process. John Walker of Kotaku praised the game as "engrossing", writing that it was a "fascinating and moving exploration of the drives behind so much indie development", highlighting the non-linear narrative structure and longer than expected length. Harrison Tabulo of Well Played wrote that whilst the writing was "a little ham-fisted at times", he noted "it's hard not connecting with the overarching themes", praising the game for its "tragic" subtexts and "hitting so close to home that it's almost hard to play".

The integration of coding mechanics into the puzzle gameplay was praised for being accessible yet complex. Writing for Well Played, Harrison Tabulo noted that whilst the game "onboards the player effortlessly", the "complexity in puzzles spirals out quickly" and creates "seemingly unfathomable variety". Walker praised the game's puzzles for reinforcing the game's message, writing "this idea of making do, of cutting corners, permeates all the puzzling in the game, making it so delightfully honest...in this superbly crafted game, even the coding puzzles lean in to the disheartening tone of trying to stay afloat during disaster."
