= Guido Henkel =

German writer and game developer (born 1964)

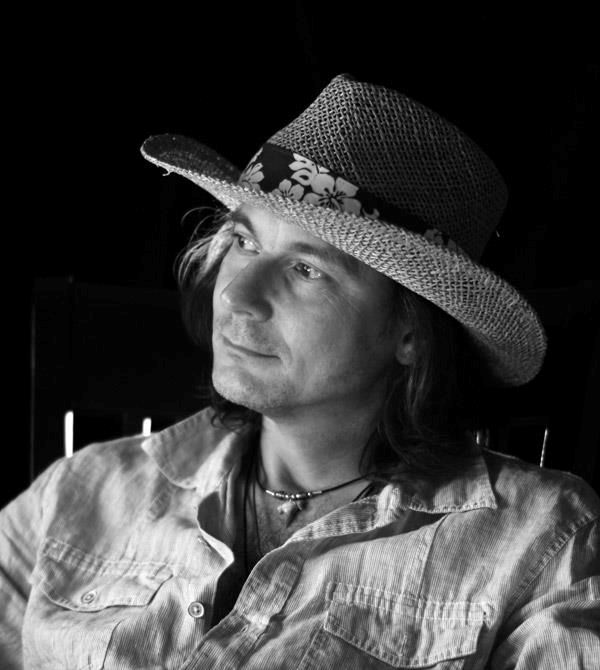
- Henkel in 2011
- Born: September 9, 1964 (age 62); Stuttgart, West Germany
- Occupation: Video game designer
- Years active: 1986–present
- Employer: Attic Entertainment Software
- Website: http://guidohenkel.com/

Guido Henkel (born September 9, 1964, in Stuttgart, Germany) is a German-American video game designer. He is most well known for his work on Planescape: Torment and for creating the Realms of Arkania series of video games.

== Early life ==
Henkel was born on September 9, 1964, in Stuttgart, Germany. He modeled a working microprocessor in high school before getting interested in video game development.

== Career ==
Henkel focused on programming out of school, and formed his first company, Dragonware Games. Henkel began making text adventure games, and then moved onto creating role-playing games. After creating a series of games for a number of different early personal computers, he landed a publishing deal with Ariolasoft. After releasing a couple of games with the company, Henkel left and formed Attic Entertainment Software with two friends which published games for a number of early computer platforms. In 1992, Attic published Realms of Arkania: Blade of Destiny, which, according to Die Zeit's Nicole Lange, was a commercial and critical success in Germany but found weak sales worldwide outside of Germany. After working with Attic on two more games, Henkel moved to the United States in 1997.

Henkel joined Interplay Productions, where he was initially assigned to their role-playing development company Black Isle Studios, which is where he served as a senior producer for Planescape: Torment. While working on the game, Henkel served as the model for the game's box cover. After having worked on a more fantasy-themed RPG series in Realms of Arkania and other fantasy games for over a decade, Henkel noted in an interview when Planescape came out that he "felt encumbered by [fantasy's] limitations and people's expectations." He noted in a retrospective interview with Rock, Paper, Shotgun that his role on Realms had involved him having his hand in everything from the art and programming to project management, while his producer role on Planescape was far more limited to administrative project management pieces. Henkel also worked on Fallout and began work on Neverwinter Nights before leaving Interplay in late 1999.

After leaving Interplay, Henkel created a home video review site, DVD Review. In 2001, Henkel joined a new company eMusement as a Vice President. eMusement was slated to develop a game with SquareSoft, but after six months, the project was cancelled and the company shut down. Henkel pivoted to working with mobile phone carriers to develop games to sell directly to consumers on their phones from 2002 to 2011. Henkel in 2013 was helping to lead a team to create a game called Deathfire: Ruins of Nevermore, but the project was canceled after it failed to reach its Kickstarter goal and further funding was not enough to keep development going; the team refunded all pledges. Henkel currently works as the Principal Software Engineer for the Intellivision Amico.

== Games ==
Game title	Year	Developer
FlipIt!	2003	G3 Studios
Video Poker Pro	2002	G3 Studios
Black Jack Pro	2002	G3 Studios
Planescape: Torment	1999	Interplay Productions
The Ultimate Wizardry Archives	1998	Interplay Productions
Herrscher der Meere	1997	Attic Entertainment Software
Realms of Arkania: Shadows over Riva	1996	Attic Entertainment Software
Fears	1995	Attic Entertainment Software
Realms of Arkania: Star Trail	1994	Attic Entertainment Software
Realms of Arkania: Blade of Destiny	1992	Attic Entertainment Software
Drachen von Laas	1991	Attic Entertainment Software
The Oath	1991	Attic Entertainment Software
Spirit of Adventure	1991	Attic Entertainment Software
Lords of Doom	1990	Attic Entertainment Software
Exolon	1989	Hewson Consultants
Ooze: Als die Geister mürbe wurden…	1989	Dragonware Games
Hellowoon: Das Geheimnis des Zauberstabs	1987	Dragonware Games

== Music ==
Herrscher der Meere	1997	Attic Entertainment Software
Realms of Arkania: Shadows over Riva	1996	Attic Entertainment Software
Jagged Alliance: Deadly Games	1996	Sir-Tech
Realms of Arkania: Star Trail	1994	Attic Entertainment Software
Drachen von Laas	1991	Attic Entertainment Software
Spirit of Adventure	1991	Attic Entertainment Software
