= Drakensang: The Dark Eye =

2008 video game

- Developer: Radon Labs
- Publishers: dtp entertainment (Ger); THQ (NA); Eidos Interactive (EU); Fx Interactive (It/Spa); Techland (PL)
- Director: Bernd Beyreuther
- Designer: Fabian Rudzinski
- Composers: Tilman Sillescu, Markus Schmidt, Pierre Langer
- Series: The Dark Eye
- Engine: Nebula Device
- Platform: Microsoft Windows
- Release: ^{AUT} 1 August 2008^{CHE} 1 August 2008^{GER} 1 August 2008^{INT} 24 February 2009
- Genre: Role-playing
- Mode: Single-player

Drakensang: The Dark Eye (German title: Das Schwarze Auge: Drakensang) is a 2008 role-playing video game developed by Radon Labs and published by dtp for Microsoft Windows. It is the first video game in The Dark Eye universe since Attic's Northlands Trilogy (Realms of Arkania: Blade of Destiny, Realms of Arkania: Star Trail and Realms of Arkania: Shadows over Riva) from the 1990s.

The game received generally favorable reviews but underperformed commercially. It was followed by the prequel River of Time, which also received an expansion, Phileasson's Secret. All of them were put in a collection that is referred as the Drakensang Saga.

== Gameplay ==
Clockwise from upper left: combat with a Linnorm; character equipment panel; conversation with an undead necromancer; a section of the overland map.

The game is based upon The Dark Eye (Das Schwarze Auge) rules system, and the graphics are generated using the Nebula Device graphics engine developed by Radon Labs. The player begins the game by building a starting character. There are a total of twenty character classes from which to choose, with many familiar RPG staples such as Fighters or unusual classes like dwarven prospectors. Each of the races can only choose from a subset of classes (or jobs). Thus an elf can be either a ranger, fighter, or spellweaver. The classes are not restricted as to what weapons they can use, although they have different starting skill levels.

The game begins with only the main character. Throughout the quest, the player will be able to recruit additional characters of different races and classes.

There are eight primary attributes, and an extensive array of talents. The broad categories are Combat talents (further divided into 13 talents with specific weapon types), Magic Talents (consisting of individual spells) and Regular Talents (containing 24 talents divided into 5 sub-categories, governing the character's non-combat skills, from crafting to social interaction).

As characters complete quests or kill enemies, they gain experience points, which can be used to increase attributes or improve talents. Each character starts with a different collection of talents, and more can be learned at trainers for a fee. During the game, the characters can learn various alchemical, archery and blacksmith recipes, then assemble materials to make weapons, ammunition, potions, lockpicks and so forth.

Most of the interactions in Drakensang require skill checking. When a character skins a slain wolf, for example, three rolls are made against the character's Cleverness, Courage and Intuition. If they pass the test (the rolled numbers are lower than the attributes), then the action is immediately successful. When one or more attribute tests fails, the points in Animal Lore talent are used to compensate for the missing points. If the test is still not passed, then the character fails to gain anything from the animal. Other actions, from picking locks to casting spells, also use the same mechanic. In case of spells, the amount of remaining talent points is also used to determine the spell's effectiveness.

Spell casting in Drakensang uses Astral Energy (AE). Each character has a certain amount of AE that can be used to cast spells, with the cost in AE dependent on the spell's power setting. AE is slowly regenerated or can be replenished by potions. The effectiveness of each spell depends on its power level and other factors.

Combat in Drakensang is executed in real time, with all characters acting at the same time. Each activity requires a specific number of time units to execute, and can be interrupted before it completes. The player can pause the action and queue orders to party members. While offensive spells never miss (they can still "fizzle" if the skill check fails), the result of physical attacks are determined by checking an attacker's chance to hit and the target's dodging or parrying ability. If the attack connects, the weapon damage and the target's armor are brought into question to calculate the amount of damage done. When a character sustains wounds from combat, their attributes are lowered. Each wound must be dealt with individually, either with bandages, spells or potions. When a character's hit points reach 0, they are incapacitated. If the whole party is incapacitated, the game is over.

The evaluation of various actions (both combat and non-combat) are displayed in a console that can be viewed by the player.

== Setting ==
The game takes place in and around the city of Ferdok, located in the Middenrealmian province of Kosh right in the center of the Aventuria. Drakensang is the name of a summit in the Anvil Mountains south of Ferdok. The fantasy game setting is based on medieval Europe. Although the designers intended to give a unique look and atmosphere, it has no unusual revisions over the conventional high fantasy setting. Magic is uncommon with only a few spells being available and enchanted items are relatively rare. Most gear upgrades come in the form of ordinary equipment, such as better armor. It is set in 1032 BF.

== Plot ==
The main character receives a letter asking for assistant from an old friend named Ardo, now living in Ferdok. On the way, the character arrives at the hamlet of Avestrue and finds that the word of two notables persons are needed to proceed to the city. The characters Rhulana the amazon and Dranor the thief are met here. Upon reaching Ferdok, the character learns of the reason for the access restrictions. Recently, Ferdok is shaken by a series of gruesome deaths, and Ardo is one of the victims. Thus begins a lengthy investigation to find the connection and put a stop to the murders. They turns out to be the work of the Dragon cultists, an ancient cult which serve Ardakor, an ancient evil dragon.

After inheriting Ardo's house, the main character is chosen by the oracle of Umbracor, the Dragon Emperor, to be champion of the Dragon Quest. At the marshes of Moorbridge, the party stops an infestation of undead and saves the Archmage Rakorium. In the Blood Mountains, the party retrieves Book of Serpent from a ruined castle where the Dragon cultists are planning dark magic. Finally, they travel to Grimtooth Castle, which has been overrun by orcs and dragon cultists, to obtain the Dragon Eye. Upon defeating the boss of each quest, the hero retrieves the components of a powerful suit of armor.

The character's next task is to find the Adamantine Heart. Doing so requires traveling to the underground dwarven city of Murolosh. However, to gain permission into the city, the party needs the assistant of an emissary named Gerling, who has traveled to the town of Tallon. In Tallon, the party is drawn into a struggle to save the town from a horde of orcs, then eliminate Jafgur, a young fire dragon raised by the Dragon Cultists. With the help of Dwarven Prince Aron, they manage to slay the dragon.

Once invited to Murolosh, the main character helps investigate an attempted assassination and save Salina, an acquaintance met in Avestrue. Afterwards, they gain the means to enter the undead-infested Deeps of Gruldur, to acquire the final component for the armor. Back to Murolosh, the party find that Arombolosh the Dwarf King has been possessed by Jafgur's heart crystal, which was put on his crown as per tradition. They successfully subdue the king and destroy the crystal, foiling the cultists' plan once more.

The party then travels to Fire Falls and discovers the Adamantine Heart. As it turns out, it is the heart crystal of Umbracor the Dragon Emperor. Pal Na'Thar, last of the cyclops and Umbracor's oracle, has been guarding the heart and keeping it out of Ardakor's reach for centuries. The Dragon Quest is meant to find his successor. The Heart is then stolen away by Malgorra, a sorceress and Dragon Cultist. Pal Na'Thar forges a weapon for the Dragon Champion and urges the party to retrieve the Heart and put an end to the cultists' plan.

On Drakensang Mountain, King Arombolosh assembles his best warriors and storm the cultists' fortress. Assisted by the dwarves, the party eventually confronts Malgorra, who transforms into a great, hydra-like dragon. The party defeats Malgorra, but Ardakor successfully consumes the Adamantine Heart. However, with Archmage Rakorium's magic, Umbracor's soul awakens from the heart and takes over Ardakor's body. Umbracor commends the bravery of the party and flies off to the sunset.

== Development ==
The game's plot was written by Anton Weste, Mark Wachholz, Momo Evers and Stefan Blanck, who all are well known as writers for The Dark Eye pen & paper role-playing game. The game's budget was approximately €2.5 million. It was first announced on 21 April 2006. Radon Labs released Drakensang's game engine under MIT license in 2006 and a later version in 2011.

== Reception ==
Reception

Aggregate score
Aggregator	Score
Metacritic	75% (35 reviews)

Review scores
Publication	Score
Eurogamer	7 out of 10
GameSpot	7.0 out of 10
GameZone	8.0 out of 10
IGN	7.5 out of 10

Drakensang: The Dark Eye was well received in the German market, but was a commercial disappointment internationally. As a result, developer Radon Labs was unable to recuperate the title's development costs and subsequently went bankrupt.

Drakensang received an average of 75% on Metacritic averaged from reviews with user reviews giving it 9.1 out of 10. IGN also gave a similar vote of 7.5 praising the detail of the game while criticizing its cliches. The Cnet review called the story generic and the management of characters overly complex, but said the game is fairly captivating. The reviewer noted, "Everything here seems to have been randomly pulled out of the grab bag of RPG cliches." It received a rating of three and half out of five stars, for a "very good" score.

The Guardian gave it four out of five stars, and said it was "worth a look if you enjoy PC role-playing games." The reviewer noted that the game has a "bit of an image problem", which he called a shame. He said the game is a structured party affair that will be familiar to players of Baldur's Gate. He called it an "above-average adventure romp that will reward gamers who commit to the cause."

The primary criticism from Eurogamer is that the game fails to sufficiently explain itself, as it lacks an in-game manual. The reviewer puts the story somewhere in between Baldur's Gate and Icewind Dale, balancing story with combat. The game lacks the moral grayness of The Witcher, but "manages to be charmingly funny upon occasion." The strongest part of the game is in the mechanics. Combat includes situations "which really do demand attention, thought, and running away and coming back later." However, the objectives are spread about, requiring plenty of travel. Combat has some "twitchiness", with characters running around to accommodate the player's orders. The review concluded that "Drakensang is a fine RPG which looks better than it is, due to the relative dearth of similar games on the PC in recent times."

GameZone criticized the number of cliches while calling the story ideas well implemented and the production values good. The game is deemed worth picking up because of some of the twists in the story lines. The one problem mentioned with the story is the long, involving side quests, which can cause the player to lose sight of the objective. The graphics are well thought of, although they could have been better. Voice work is strong, but there is an insufficient amount. Control of the characters during combat is called frustrating with characters responding slower than they need to. In conclusion, the game is called "a good, quality title that has few bugs, an engaging story and maybe more than a few cliches."

Drakensang: The Dark Eye won the "Best RPG 2008", "Best Story" and "Best Soundtrack" at the Deutscher Entwicklerpreis.

== Related works ==
A prequel to the game titled Drakensang: The River of Time was released in February 2010. As of August 2009, another game set in the same universe, The Dark Eye: Demonicon, was in development by Silver Style Entertainment, the in-house studio of The Games Company.

In 2011, Bigpoint released a new title, Drakensang Online, a browser-based RPG game with a more Diablo-style approach compared to its predecessors.
