= Peter Groeger =

German actor

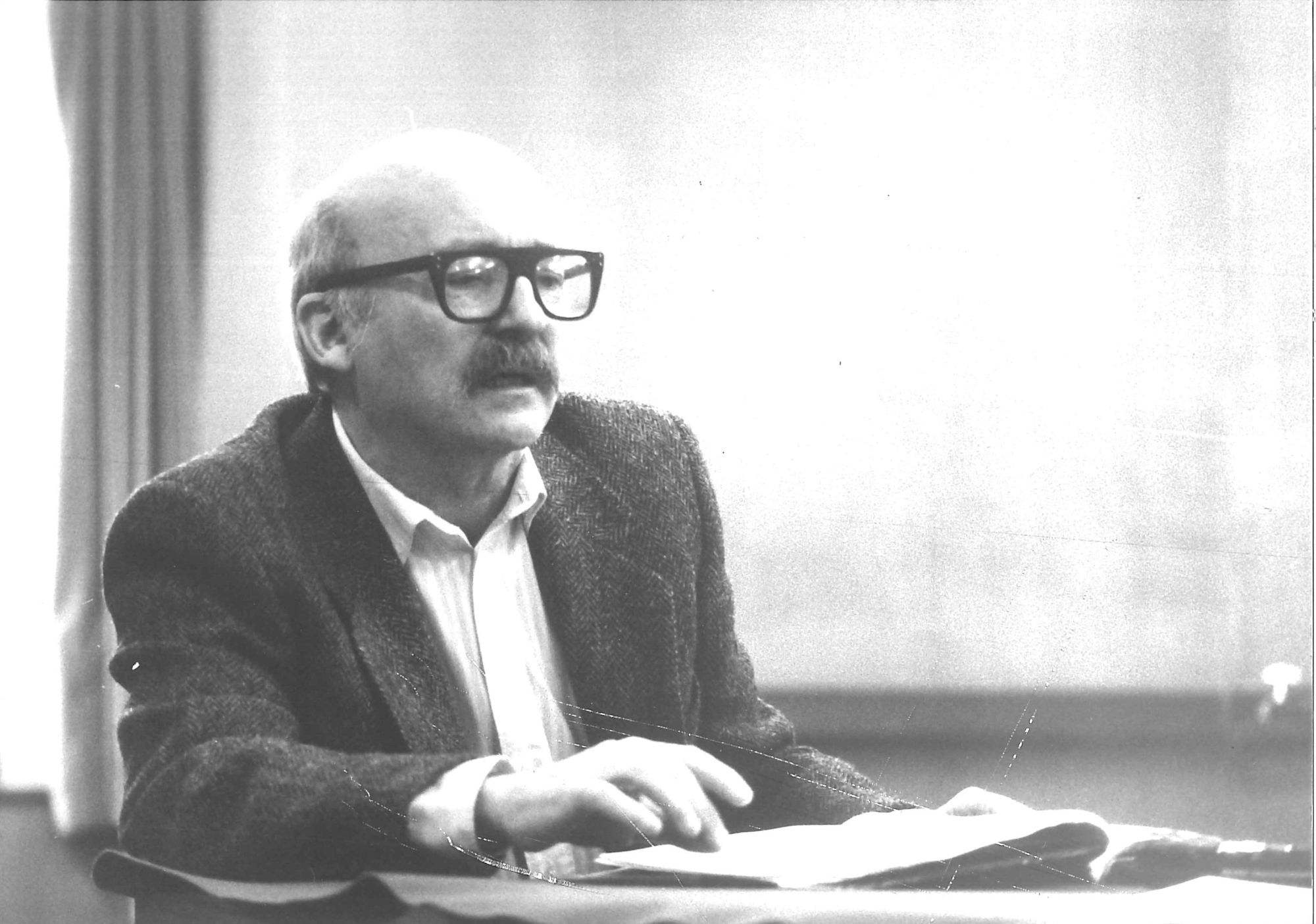
Peter Groeger

Peter Groeger (1 June 1933 in Gröbzig, Free State of Anhalt – 16 January 2018 in Berlin) was a German actor and director.

== Life ==
Groeger grew up in Gröbzig. He was assistant director at Wolfgang Langhoff at the Deutsches Theater. After a study of direction in Moscow, he came to the radio broadcast of the GDR, where he was responsible for foreign radio plays as Head of International Radio Drama. Peter Groeger became well-known mainly through his numerous radio drama productions and as a voice actor of the bartender Quark (Armin Shimerman) in the science fiction series Star Trek: Deep Space Nine.

From 1973 to 1978, he was seen as MAD-man Roloff within the first 14 episodes of the TV series Das unsichtbare Visier. In 1996, he served as Richard Graf # 2 look at Good Times, Bad Times. From 1998 to 2002 he played the character of Dr. Iron Wire in several commercials for the fuel station chain DEA. From August 2009, he was again seen in this role, this time in similarly designed commercials for energy supplier RWE. From 1998 to 2007 he took over the role of the director Schwalbe in the TV series Anja & Anton.

Since 2004 he has also been in the Sherlock Holmes radio play of the publishing group Hermann, heard in the role of Dr. Watson alongside Holmes spokesman Christian Rode. To fantasy fans he is also known as dubbing voice of the Dwarves Forgrimm from the computer games The Dark Eye: Drakensang The Dark Eye and Drakensang: The River of Time. In addition, he was also the narrator in the Drakensang radio plays. Since 2009, he also spoke some minor roles in the Radio Tatort of the MDR.

Since 2007 he was part of the ensemble of the Berlin Criminal Theatre, where he appeared in Arsenic and Old Lace, The Name of the Rose and Inspector Campbell's Last Case.

== Filmography (selection) ==
- 1956: Zwischenfall in Benderath
- 1959: Nasreddin und der Wucherer (TV)
- 1963: Blaulicht: Heißes Geld (TV series)
- 1966: Die Reise nach Sundevit
- 1972: Polizeiruf 110: Blütenstaub (TV series)
- 1975–1978: Das unsichtbare Visier (TV series)
- 1983: Abends im Kelch (TV)
- 1984: Polizeiruf 110: Das vergessene Labor (TV series)
- 1986: Polizeiruf 110: Parkplatz der Liebe (TV series)
- 1992: Blinky Bill der Film
- 1993–2004: Blinky Bill (TV series)
- 1996: Gute Zeiten, schlechte Zeiten (TV series)
- 1998: Walli, die Eisfrau (TV)
- 1998–2006: Anja & Anton (TV series)
- 1999: Die letzte Chance (TV)
- 1999–2001: Watership Down (TV series, German dub)
- 2005: Blinky Bill’s Weiße Weihnacht (TV movie)
- 2008: Unser Charly, episode Alle für einen (TV series)
- since 2010: Blue Bloods – Crime Scene New York (Blue Bloods, TV series)
