= Drakensang Online =

2011 video game

- Developer: Bigpoint Berlin
- Publishers: Bigpoint bitComposer Games (retail)
- Producer: Bernd Beyreuther
- Engine: Nebula Engine
- Platforms: Microsoft Windows; Apple OS X
- Release: August 2011
- Genre: MMORPG
- Mode: Multiplayer

Drakensang Online is a freemium online role-playing video game developed and published by Bigpoint for Microsoft Windows and macOS. The title was in an open beta phase from August 2011 to July 2012. A retail version was released in November 2011.

Drakensang Online takes place in the world of Dracania where players assume the role of a character (Dragonknight, Ranger, Spellweaver or Steam Mechanicus) and discover cities, dungeons and wilderness areas in the 11 different regions in Dracania.

Drakensang Online was awarded the Deutscher Entwicklerpreis award as the best German role-playing game and the "best browser game" award at the Deutscher Computerspielpreis.

== Gameplay ==
Drakensang Online is very similar to the Diablo game franchise and to other comparable titles in the way that is played from an isometric perspective.

At the beginning of the game, the player creates a character by choosing to play as one of the four different character classes (Dragonknight, Ranger, Spellweaver and Steam Mechanicus) each of which has a different set of attributes. It is possible to create a maximum of up to four characters per account and server. The player can play solo or together with other players. There is also a guild system where players can organize themselves into alliances. Communication takes place via an internal chat system.

The Drakensang world known as Dracania is a freely explorable open world similar to medieval Europe. Dracania has eleven regions with multiple cities, dungeons and wilderness areas.

For faster progression, a player can use the in-game virtual currency called Andermant to purchase weapons, upgrade items, teleport to other locations and more. There are a few ways to get Andermant. You can find it in the game by completing missions/quests, slaying monsters or opening chests. It can be bought with real money (free-to-play principle), similar to other free online and browser games, in an item shop by clicking on the in game Purchase button. And it can also be earned by participating in surveys or deals offered by the game's sponsors.

== History ==
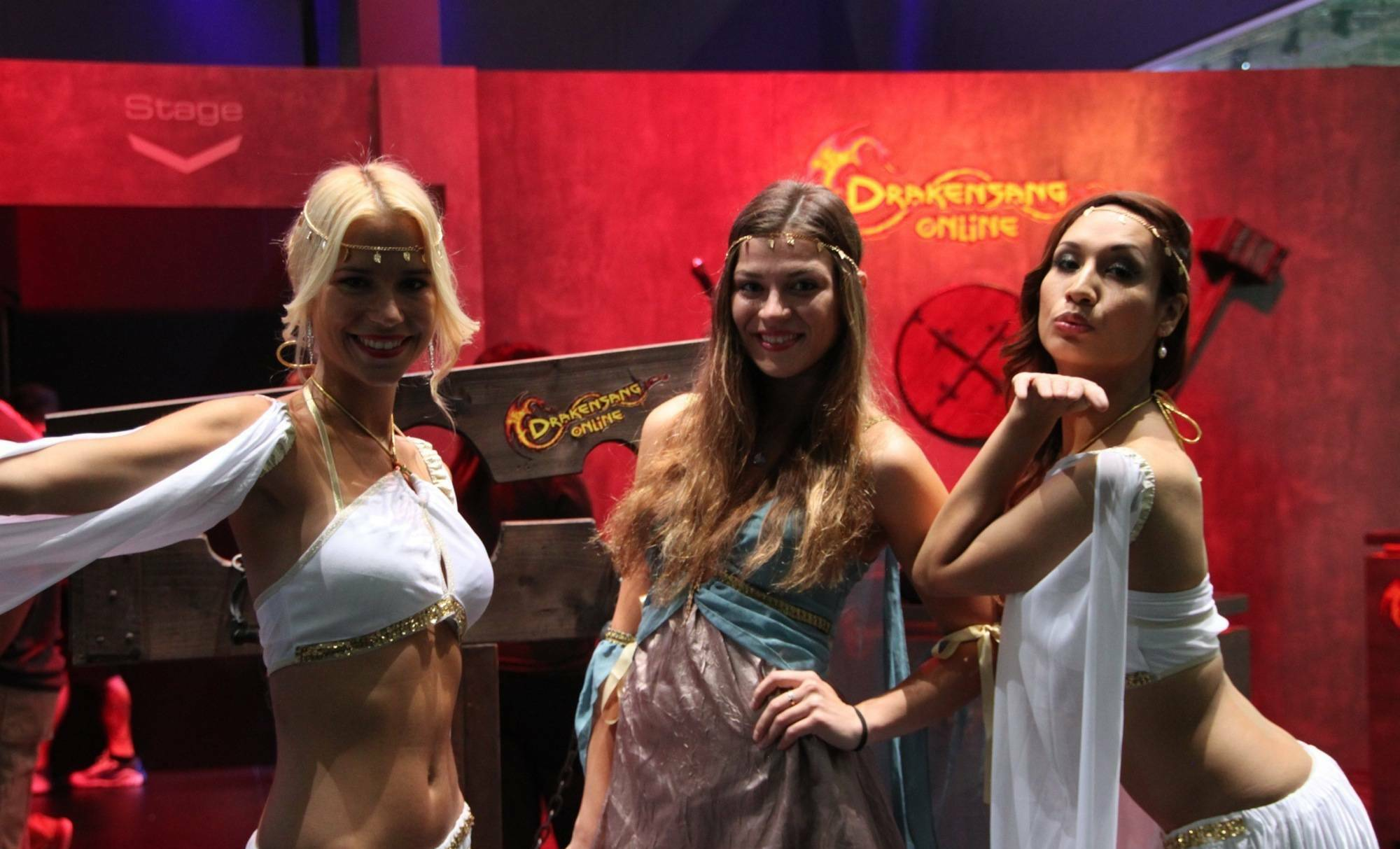
Promotion at Gamescom 2014

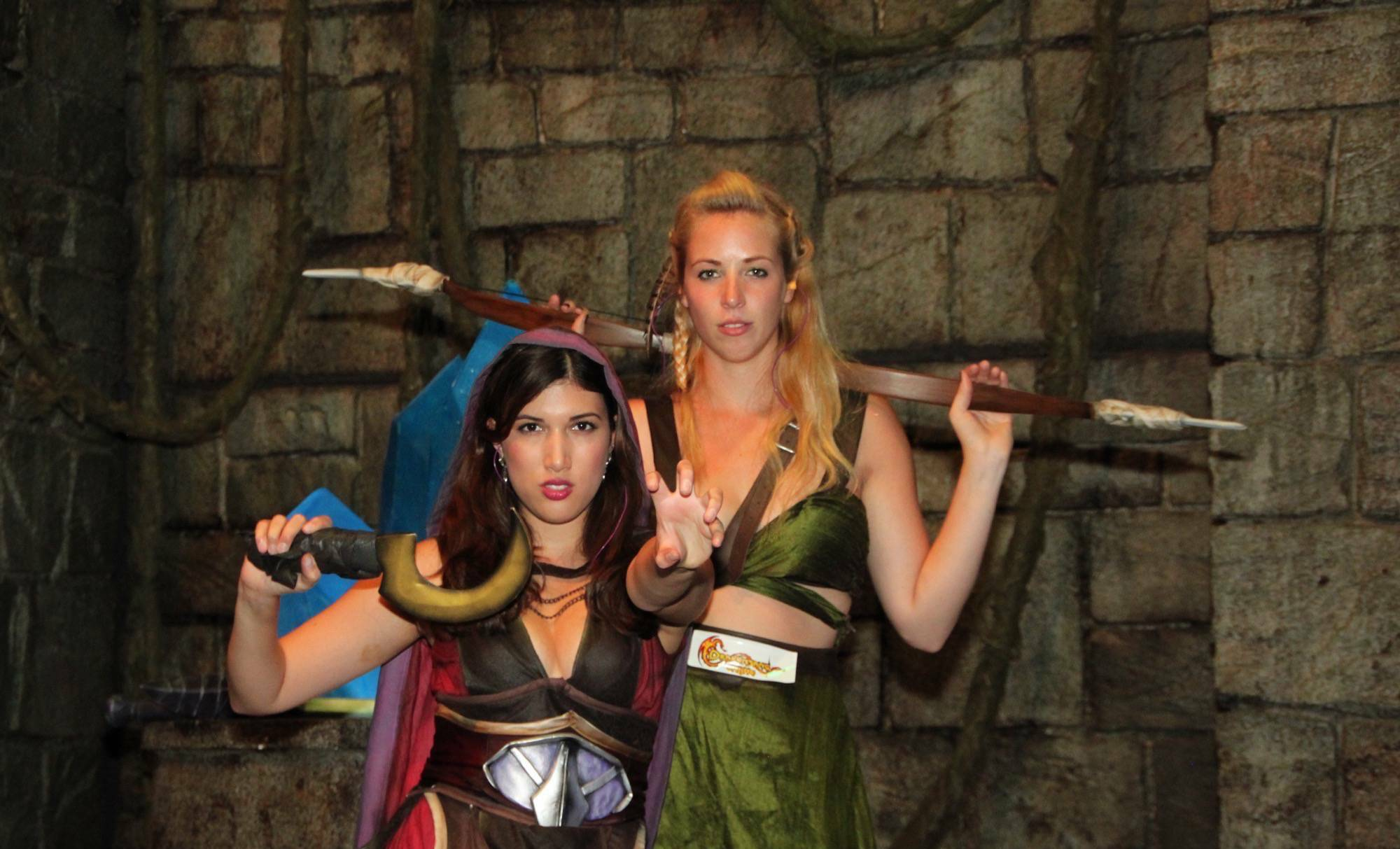
Promotion at Gamescom 2015

The roots of the project sprouted in 2008 when German studio Radon Labs released the title Drakensang: The Dark Eye and then in 2010, its successor Drakensang: The River of Time. They were classical single player role-playing games that both took place in the virtual game world of The Dark Eye (Das Schwarze Auge, DSA). In May 2010, Radon Labs filed for bankruptcy. It was then acquired by Bigpoint Games and was fully integrated in the existing studio of Bigpoint Berlin. In September 2010, the development of Drakensang Online was announced. Because Bigpoint did not acquire a TDE (DSA) license and only had ownership of the name rights for "Drakensang", they developed a completely new game world with an independent rule system which had no relationship to any of its predecessors.

Like all other Radon Labs titles, the game is based on the custom Nebula Engine, which was meant for use in a browser. The game is written in C++ and runs within a Java applet in the browser. Since Java is no longer supported by some browsers, a downloadable client was made available in April 2014. In August 2011, Drakensang Online released an open beta version for testing which included the item shop for purchasing Andermant. With the inclusion of the virtual currency, the game was able to start its business operations.

Although it is a browser-based game, two retail versions were released which included some items, that were otherwise available in the in-game store. The less expensive version included stronger armor as well as more combat power of the character and 10,000 Andermant, with which the player could use to buy other items via the in-game shop. The more expensive version included all the content of the other version plus a dragon that could be used as a pet, increased armor and combat power. According to the developer, the dragon gave the player a +20% bonus of experience points. Later, the contingent of included Andermant got increased from 10,000 to 12,000 Andermant.

== Reception ==
Reception

Aggregate score
Aggregator	Score
Metacritic	69/100

It received a positive reception by the German magazine GameStar for its high-quality graphics in comparison with other browser-based games. Overall, Drakensang Online was described as a "frame of action role-playing game". A month after its release, more than 850,000 accounts were created. It has frequently been cited as one of the best new browser MMOs upon release.

In 2011, Drakensang Online was awarded the Deutscher Entwicklerpreis award as the best German role-playing game. In 2012, it won the "best browser game" award at the Deutscher Computerspielpreis and was described as an "outstanding German game production".
