= The Dark Eye: Memoria =

2013 video game

- Developer: Daedalic Entertainment
- Publisher: Daedalic Entertainment
- Designer: Kevin Mentz
- Composers: Dominik Morgenroth; Daniel Pharos
- Series: The Dark Eye
- Platforms: Windows; OS X; Nintendo Switch; PlayStation 4; Xbox One
- Release: Windows, OS X 30 August 2013; Switch, PS4, Xbox One; 27 January 2021
- Genre: Point-and-click adventure game
- Mode: Single-player

The Dark Eye: Memoria (German: Das Schwarze Auge: Memoria, also known as Memoria) is a 2013 German point-and-click adventure game, developed and published by Daedalic Entertainment. The game is part of the video game series based on The Dark Eye, and is a direct sequel to Chains of Satinav. The game's story takes place after the events of the previous game, and focus upon Geron's quest to find a way to help his fairy Nuri recover, only to become caught in trying to unravel the mystery behind the disappearance of a heroic princess called Sadja and the quest she undertook. Following its release, the game received favourable reviews. The game was released for Windows and OS X on 30 August 2013. The game was released for Nintendo Switch, PlayStation 4, and Xbox One on 27 January 2021.

== Gameplay ==
The gameplay follows a typical point-and-click format, with the player clicking on objects to interact with them as well as various dialogue options. The game progresses in a linear fashion with a prologue and eight distinct chapters.

== Plot ==
In The Dark Eye: Memoria, the plot is divided into a story within a story structure. Geron, the protagonist of Chains of Satinav, is searching for a way to cure his lover, Nuri, who was turned into a raven at the conclusion of the previous game.

At the beginning of Memoria, a merchant named Fahi promises Geron that he has the power to restore Nuri back to her original forest fairy self. In return, Geron has to find out what happened to Sadja, a heroic princess from the exotic land of Fasar, whom everybody has forgotten over the past 450 years.

== Characters ==
The main characters are:

=== Present time period ===
- Geron: The protagonist from the previous game, Geron is a birdcatcher with some magical ability. His goal is to restore the fairy Nuri to her original form.
- Nuri: Geron's love interest from the previous game, Nuri is a fairy who has been transformed into a raven. She is slowly losing her memories of her previous life.
- Fahi: A Tulamede merchant, Fahi is the secret companion to Halef, who protects him from mobs in return for services. Fahi promises to transform Nuri back into a fairy if Geron can help him solve a riddle. Fahi's ability to see into the past of objects provides the key to the story's resolution.
- Bryda: An apprentice mage who assists Geron in his attempts to solve the riddle.
- Owlric: An elderly mage.

=== Historic time period ===
- Sadja: A young woman living 450 years before Geron's time, Sadja is determined to make a name for herself and leave a great legacy of her exploits. She seeks out the fortress of Drakonia, where she hopes to join the battle against demon hordes of Nether Hells.
- Halef (Staff): A former servant of Malakkar, Halef was transformed into a magic staff as punishment by his master. He is discovered by Sadja and forms a strong bond with her during her quest to Drakonia. After Sadja's disappearance, Halef waited for centuries to accumulate enough magic to create a body for himself and seek out the truth of her fate.
- Rachwan: A tribal outcast that acts as guide to Sadja but repeatedly betrays her.
- Prince Kasim: An arrogant prince who attempts to unlock the secrets of the Djinn of Time to create a kingdom bound to his rule.

== Reception ==
=== Domestic press ===
Reception

Review scores
Publication	Score
Gameswelt	9.0/10
GameStar	85/100
PC Games	84%
4Players	81/100

Eurogamer.de praised the game, calling it "...what Daedalic was striving for all these years: A fantastical, but at the same time mature, Adventure, well thought-out and a personal experience through and through.". While Game Star praised the title's visual design and style calling it an "...atmospherically dense adventure impresses with its beautifully drawn and lovingly detailed game world."

=== International reviews ===
The game received generally favourable reviews achieving an average Metascore of 79 out of 100 based on 43 critic reviews. Ryan Bates at Game Revolution was critical of the games puzzles stating "The puzzles don't always make sense in Memoria to the point that it repeatedly made me quit in frustration."

=== Sales ===
By 2016, Memoria was Daedalic's second-highest-grossing game behind The Dark Eye: Blackguards. Daedalic's Carsten Fichtelmann attributed this success to "a high rate of full price sales", compared to the greater sales quantity but lower revenue of the Deponia series.
