= The Dark Eye: Chains of Satinav =

2012 video game

- Developer: Daedalic Entertainment
- Publishers: NA: Deep Silver; PAL: Merge Games (Note: Console ports published by Daedalic Entertainment.)
- Designer: Franziska Reinhard
- Composer: Dominik Morgenroth
- Series: The Dark Eye
- Platforms: Windows; OS X; Nintendo Switch; PlayStation 4; Xbox One
- Release: Windows, OS X 22 June 2012; Switch, PS4, Xbox One; 27 January 2021
- Genre: Graphic adventure
- Mode: Single-player

The Dark Eye: Chains of Satinav (German: Das Schwarze Auge: Satinavs Ketten) is a 2012 graphic adventure game developed by the German studio Daedalic Entertainment and published by Deep Silver. Part of The Dark Eye series, the game is set in the fictional place of Aventuria within the Kingdom of Andergast. The player controls the protagonist, Geron, who tries to save the town from disaster.

== Gameplay ==
The Dark Eye: Chains of Satinav is controlled with a point-and-click interface.

== Development ==
The Dark Eye: Chains of Satinav was announced in 2010 at a German convention to be released some time in 2012. In February 2012, the release was scheduled for 23 March 2012. In March 2012, the game was delayed to second quarter of 2012. In May 2012, the game was announced for release on 22 June 2012. The game was released for Nintendo Switch, PlayStation 4, and Xbox One on 27 January 2021.

== Reception ==
The Dark Eye: Chains of Satinav received "generally positive" reviews, according to review aggregator Metacritic.

Reception

Aggregate score
Aggregator	Score
Metacritic	75/100

Review scores
Publication	Score
Adventure Gamers	3.5/5
Destructoid	6.5/10
Eurogamer	8/10
GameSpot	76/100
GameSpy	2.5/5
PC Games	83%
GameStar	81/100
4Players	79/100

== Sequel ==
Daedalic Entertainment followed The Dark Eye: Chains of Satinav with a sequel, The Dark Eye: Memoria.
