= DSA-Professional: Schwertmeister Set 1 =

DSA-Professional: Schwertmeister Set 1 is a 1987 role-playing game supplement published by Schmidt Spiele for Das Schwarze Auge.

== Contents ==
DSA-Professional: Schwertmeister Set 1 is a supplement in which elite heroes are offered a complex combat system, runestone-based magic, and epic adventures with progression up to level 40.

== Reviews ==
- Casus Belli #45 (as "Oeil Noir - Règles Avancées - Maîtres d'Armes 1")
- Jeux & Stratégie #51 (as "L'Œil Noir - Maîtres d'armes - Règles avancées")
