= Realms of Arkania: Blade of Destiny =

1992 video game

- Cover art by Ugurcan Yüce
- Developer: Attic Entertainment Software
- Publishers: GER: Fantasy Productions; EU: U.S. Gold; NA: Sir-Tech
- Designers: Hans-Jürgen Brändle; Guido Henkel
- Writers: Michael Johann; Thomas Römer
- Composer: Rudolf Stember
- Series: The Dark Eye
- Platforms: Amiga, MS-DOS
- Release: GER: April 1992; EU: April 1993; NA: June 1993
- Genre: Role-playing
- Mode: Single player

Realms of Arkania: Blade of Destiny is a role-playing video game developed by Attic Entertainment Software. It was the first game based on the German pen & paper RPG system The Dark Eye by Schmidt Spiele. The original German version of the game (German title: Das Schwarze Auge: Die Schicksalsklinge) was released in 1992. Due to its success it was translated to English and released by Sir-Tech in 1993.

== Gameplay ==
Realms of Arkania: Blade of Destiny is a classical 3D party role-playing video game that has up to six characters (plus an optional NPC that may be recruited) moving through 3D towns and dungeons. Travels between those 3D levels were simulated by showing a path on a regional 2D map. The game generally uses the same pseudo-3D-engine as Attic's 1991 game Spirit of Adventure, utilizing an increased resolution for the 3D part of the screen. The game also borrowed ideas from Eye of the Beholder (the inventory user interface) and Might and Magic III: Isles of Terra (the main screen user interface layout). The game did not feature NPC/monster sprites in the 3D view (a shortcoming that can be found in the entire Northlands Trilogy) that were already introduced by the first 3D real-time action role-playing video game - Dungeon Master - in 1987. Instead of visualizing fights in the 3D view, the game switched to the isometric perspective for a unique turn-based tactical combat simulation.

== Plot ==
An orc chief has united all tribes of the orcs and plans to attack the lands of the humans. The player is hired by Hetman Tronde Torbensson, the leader of the Thorwalians, to find the sword Grimring (the Blade of Destiny) and prevent an orc invasion on Thorwal. However, Grimring has been lost since the death of its bearer, the Hetman Hyggelik the Great. In order to recover the sword, the player must find pieces of a treasure map which shows the location of the sword. Once the sword is recovered the player needs to defeat the orc chief and his minions. If the player does not succeed within about two in-game years, the orcs will attack and the player loses.

== Reception ==
According to Die Zeit, all three games in the Realms of Arkania series, including Blade of Destiny, were commercially and critically successful. The paper's Nicole Lange reported in 2011 that the three entries together had surpassed 2.4 million sales worldwide.

In a 1993 review from Computer Gaming World, Scorpia wrote, "'Das Schwarze Auge' means 'The Black Eye,' and that might be appropriate here". She wrote that "there are so many things wrong with the game play that we should start off with the few that are right" such as automapping and extra experience points for fighting unfamiliar enemies, but criticized the "awkward and confusing" magic system, discrepancies between the documentation and gameplay. Worst of all, she wrote, were the reduction in experience points for saving outside a temple, high failure rates during combat, and a bug that "won" the game by quitting during the final fight.

The One gave the Amiga version of Blade of Destiny an overall score of 73%, criticizing its graphics and small draw distance, saying "you can't even 'see' the poorly-drawn buildings until you're practically standing in front of them" and calling it a generic RPG, stating "The main problem with Blade of Destiny is that you really have seen this sort of thing before - and better, most probably. There are few surprises as you travel around, with everyone and everything you meet conforming to their usual clichéd fantasy roles." The One criticized the combat, calling it "uninspiring", and expressed that the 'movement points' system removes a sense of urgency.

Jim Trunzo reviewed Realms of Arkania in White Wolf #38 (1993), giving it a final evaluation of "Good" and stated that "A standard theme (find the Blade of Destiny in order to thwart a powerful Orc army led by a charismatic but violent leader) creates the basis for the game. Over 70 towns, villages, dungeons and ruins make Arkania a large and interesting land to explore. One nice thing about the game is the originality of some of the monster types encountered. If you're looking for a solid roleplaying adventure that will challenge you without frustrating you, Realms of Arkania is sure to be to your liking."

Compute! in December 1993 was mixed on the game's graphics and sound, but concluded that "Realms of Arkania has plenty of depth". The magazine recommended it to Wizardry and Might of Magic fans, while those wanting Ultima Underworld-like real-time combat "won't be as impressed".

Chris W. McCubbin reviewed Realms of Arkania: Blade of Destiny in Pyramid #6 (March/April, 1994), and stated that "I have no hesitancy about recommending Realms of Arkania for what it does well -- graphics, story and background. And I remain optimistic about the combat problems as well. After all, Blade of Destiny is only the first game in the Realms of Arkania series. If subsequent games correct the unrealistic aspects of ranged combat, Realms of Arkania could easily be a state-of-the art game for mature, discerning computer gamers."

== Legacy ==
=== Sequels ===
Blade of Destiny was the first game in the Northlands Trilogy, it was followed by Realms of Arkania: Star Trail, and Realms of Arkania: Shadows over Riva. As a feature players could save the game after beating it, this allowed the players to import their characters into any of the sequels.

=== Remake ===
A remake developed by the Austrian Crafty Studios and published by German United Independent Entertainment was released on Steam on July 30, 2013. Metacritic, a review aggregator, rated it 18/100 based on five reviews. This is one of Metacritic's lowest ratings for a PC game. On release, the game was plagued with bugs, and the developer's forums were full of complaints. Crafty Studios eventually posted an apology to Steam in which they promised to update the game. Steven Strom of Ars Technica, in an article where he played each of the five worst-rated games on Metacritic, said the remake is playable but still feels unfinished, including untranslated dialogue.
