= Blackguards 2 =

2015 video game

- Developer: Daedalic Entertainment
- Publisher: Daedalic Entertainment
- Composer: Peter Connelly
- Series: The Dark Eye
- Platforms: Microsoft Windows; OS X PlayStation 4 Xbox One; Nintendo Switch
- Release: Microsoft Windows, OS X; January 20, 2015; Playstation 4, Xbox One; September 12, 2017; Nintendo Switch; June 15, 2022
- Genres: Turn-based tactics, tactical role-playing
- Mode: Single-player

Blackguards 2 (German: Das Schwarze Auge: Blackguards 2) is a tactical role-playing game developed and published by Daedalic Entertainment for Microsoft Windows and OS X in January 2015. It was ported to PlayStation 4 and Xbox One in September 2017 and Nintendo Switch in June 2022. It is a sequel to 2014's The Dark Eye: Blackguards.

== Gameplay ==
Battles are turn-based and take place on a hexagonally gridded playing field. Units can topple stacked boxes, activate traps, cast spells, and drop chandeliers on enemies to attack them. The player comes across allies as they progress through the story, which each have skill trees and can be equipped with weapons or gear.

== Plot ==
Three years have passed since Count Uria's plots. The Vanquishers of the Nine Hordes long parted ways but life in Aventuria went on. Cassia, a young woman of noble descent, has only one goal: She wants to claim the Shark Throne, no matter the price; and be it only for one day. Unfortunately, there are two problems that potentially foil her plans. First of all, she spends her days incarcerated in a dungeon and secondly, there is already a man on her throne: Marwan. She is neither fond nor proficient in matters of diplomacy or politics, so she chooses a more... practical approach. She intends to break out of prison and overthrow Marwan to claim the throne herself. For this, she needs strong allies. She needs to recruit an army of Sellswords and rally the Vanquishers of the Nine Hordes around her. Sounds like a solid plan, doesn't it? But then again, how cunning must one be to escape the dungeon's walls; and how reckless must one be to gather and command the worst scum of the realms?

== Development and release ==
Blackguards 2 was released for Microsoft Windows and OS X on January 20, 2015. It was ported to PlayStation 4 and Xbox One on September 12, 2017, and for Nintendo Switch on June 15, 2022.

== Reception ==
Reception

Aggregate score
Aggregator	Score
Metacritic	74/100

Review scores
Publication	Score
Destructoid	6/10
Eurogamer	7/10
GameRevolution	8/10
GameSpot	8/10
IGN	7.8/10
PCGamesN	8/10

Blackguards 2 received average reviews from professional critics upon release. Aggregate review website Metacritic assigned the PC version a score of 74/100 based on 48 reviews. IGN rates it 7.8 out of 10, commenting that it improved on its predecessor: "you can spend less time confused about the details, and more time fighting."
