= The Lady, the Mage and the Knight =

- Developer: Larian Studios
- Publisher: Attic Entertainment Software
- Programmer: Swen Vincke
- Platform: Windows
- Release: Cancelled
- Genre: Action role-playing

The Lady, the Mage and the Knight, also known as LMK, is a cancelled role-playing video game that was in development in the late 1990s by Larian Studios and to be published by German based Attic Entertainment Software.

== Gameplay ==
The gameplay presents the player with fast‑paced real‑time combat built around fighting large numbers of relatively weak monsters, encourages immersion through a highly detailed simulated world and NPCs with their own behaviors, and allows the player to develop the Lady, the Mage, or the Knight by increasing skills, attributes, and spells that visibly influence how those characters act in the world; spells generally succeed if cast, skills improve through practice and leveling, quests are designed with multiple solutions and no dead ends, and multiplayer support was planned with limited numbers of players sharing pre‑arranged scenarios.

== Development ==
The Lady, the Mage and the Knight started out being developed for an 8-bit platform in early 1996, under the working title Unless, The Treachery of Death. Larian was making LMK for the european PC division of Atari.

The companies involved with LMK were Larian Studios (Development), Attic (Publishing and Co-development), Virgin lands (Cutscenes), Fantasy productions (Design and Story), and Infogrames (Distribution). LMK was scheduled to be released in 1998, later in 1999, but ultimately was cancelled.
