= The Dark Eye: Skilltree Saga =

2014 video game

- Developer: Silent Dreams
- Publisher: Headup Games
- Series: The Dark Eye
- Platforms: Microsoft Windows, Android, iOS
- Release: December 2014
- Genre: RPG
- Mode: Single-player

The Dark Eye: Skilltree Saga (German: Das Schwarze Auge: Skilltree Saga) is a role-playing video game developed by German studio Silent Dreams and published by Headup Games for Microsoft Windows, Android and iOS, and released in December 2014.

== Gameplay ==
The game is set in the world of The Dark Eye. The Dark Eye: Skilltree Saga uses 2D and 2.5D graphics and involves creating a character and progressing through the story whilst unlocking various abilities in the skill tree.

== Reception ==
A Gamepressure review criticised the visuals as "low budget", and stated that "[the] storyline and exploration of the world are presented here on boards with static, two-dimensional graphics, while the duels take place in a 2.5D environment". Martin Roger from Eurogamer was also critical of the game's price, narrative, and "limited gameplay".
