= Abenteuer Ausbau-Spiel =

Abenteuer Ausbau-Spiel is a 1985 role-playing game supplement published by Gallimard and Schmidt Spiele for Das Schwarze Auge.

== Contents ==
Abenteuer Ausbau-Spiel is a supplement in which a boxed expansion offers extended rules, new archetypes, and detailed Aventurien lore with rulebook, background guide, hex-sheets, map, and GM screen.

== Reviews ==
- Casus Belli #35 (as "L'Extension au Jeu d'Aventure")
- Jeux & Stratégie #41 (as "Extension au Jeu d'Aventure")
