= Realms of Arkania: Shadows over Riva =

1996 video game

- Cover art by Ugurcan Yüce
- Developer: Attic Entertainment Software
- Publishers: GER: TopWare Interactive; NA: Sir-Tech; UK: U.S. Gold
- Designers: Guido Henkel; Hans-Jürgen Brändle; Horst Weidle
- Programmers: Hans-Jürgen Brändle; Lothar Ahle; Wolfgang Schulz
- Artists: Vadim Pietrzynski; Markus Henrich; André Taulien
- Composer: Guido Henkel
- Series: The Dark Eye
- Platform: MS-DOS
- Release: GER: December 1996; NA: May 1997; UK: 1997
- Genre: Role-playing
- Mode: Single player

Realms of Arkania: Shadows over Riva (German title: Das Schwarze Auge: Schatten über Riva, translated as "The Dark Eye: Shadow above Riva") is a role-playing video game based on the German role-playing game system Das Schwarze Auge by Attic Entertainment Software. It is the sequel to Realms of Arkania: Blade of Destiny and Realms of Arkania: Star Trail. The original German version of the game was published by TopWare Interactive in 1996. Sir-Tech released the English version in 1997.

The game was re-released via DOSBox for Windows in 2009 on GOG.com, OS X in 2013; it released in 2014 on Steam for both platforms and Linux.

== Plot ==
Shadows over Riva continues after Realms of Arkania: Star Trail. After uniting the dwarves and elves, the party stops by the harbor city of Riva, which is under siege by the Orcish hordes. The countryside's once-lucrative dwarven mine has been decimated and occupied by the Orcs after a string of well-coordinated attacks. For some unknown reason, the magistrate refuses to recognize the threat the orcs pose just outside the city gates. Meanwhile, rumors abound of traitors in the slum ridden-Hoberkian community and strange corpse disappearances within the city's graveyard, the Field of Boron.

As the party investigates each lead, more questions seem to surface than answers. After investigating the dwarven mines the traps' design suggests that the Orcs have become much smarter and more organized than normally possible; they are no longer fragmented tribes warring among themselves. They speak of a single, wise, all-powerful chieftain with the powers of a wizard. Upon confronting the chieftain deep within the mines, he summons a massive demon from the underworld to fight the party. The party defeats it and sends the demon back to the underworld. When they kill the Orc chieftain, a tiny worm emerges from the chieftain's head and flees.

Returning to the city with this new information, the party still finds the city's magistrate apathetic. They befriend the Holberkians when they save one of them from a mob. As half-elves and half-Orcs, they know of the orcish hordes, but earned the enmity of the citizens, who think they are responsible for the Orcish siege of the city. The Hoberkians noticed a pronounced change in the Orcs' activity, suggesting an outside influence. They reveal a long-absent sorcerer living on an island in the swamp who could have been responsible for the changes in the orcs. The next day, the party is escorted to the sorcerer's tower, where they find experiments and letters pointing to a person known only as Borborad and his shipment of two worm queens. One queen was delivered but a second was lost en route when the urn sank with a cargo ship in Riva's harbor during a storm. Research notes further reveal much information on the worm spawned from the queen. They possess extreme intelligence and could possess hosts by entering their brains through the nose. They are also linked telepathically to the queen who spawned them and could not be killed unless the queen is killed. Queens reside in hives which were invulnerable to attack due to the queen's magic.

After returning to Riva, the party speaks with the magistrate about their suspicions, who dismisses them. Within the day, they are framed for murder. An underground movement contacts the group and offers them sanctuary and the use of a tunnel system that surfaces in every temple. They are informed of the movement's suspicions that the magistrate is under some unknown influence, possibly a worm spawn. They are tasked to rescue a group of wizards from the magistrate's prison island. The party witnesses an attempt at implanting worms into the wizards. After they are rescued, the wizards inform the group that it was the magistrate who ordered an expedition to recover the sunken ship items from the harbor. One of the urns was brought to him, which released the worm queen when it was opened. It possessed the magistrate, established a hive, and used its spawn to possess various people around the city. The worm queen is able to hear and see everything the possessed townsfolk see and hear. The group is told that the one remaining urn in the sunken ship is required to learn more about the queen and a means to defeat them. After obtaining the urn from the merfolk that lives in the waters near Riva's harbor, the wizards spend a few days studying the queen inside.

When the wizards summon the party, they give them a shrinking spell that reduces them to worm size and allows them to enter the magically reinforced hive. They fight their way through the hive, pick their way through a confusing maze, and fight off telepathic nightmares before confronting the queen. After killing her, they return to their normal size, destroying the hive as they grow, since the magic protecting the hive walls broke with the queen's death. Everywhere in the city, the worm spawn are dying and falling out of their hosts. None of them recall them being under the influence of the spawn, so the party is still considered to be a band of fugitives. They are forced to escape the city, but they go with the knowledge and satisfaction that they saved everyone from the orcish invasion. Without the queen's leadership, the orcish hordes fragment back into their warring tribes. Borborad swears vengeance against the party who foils his plans.

=== Side-stories ===
There is a sidequest involving the disappearances of corpses from the city cemetery known as the Field of Boron. The group finds one freshly dug grave to be a fake which leads to a shapeshifter's quarters below ground. After killing the shapeshifter and its demon familiar, they uncover information indicating the presence of a felimia, an elven vampire. The party goes on another side quest to investigate the sewers where they run across a massive humanoid rat, the city's rat catcher, and an old slight hag. The party travels deeper into the sewers and discovers the city's secret underground resistance. The old hag suddenly displays inhuman powers as she grabs an elf, kills him, and changes into a beautiful elven female sporting vampiric canines. The group learns from different citizens that, the last time the city caught the felimia, they imprisoned her in a coffin buried in the Field of Boron. After digging up the coffin, the group finds it empty with a hole in its bottom that leads to the shapeshifter's quarters; the felimia had bypassed the charms placed on the cover of the coffin by breaking through the bottom of the coffin. The resistance contacts the party and tells them that they learned that moonlight can kill the felimia when they last fought her. With the help of the resistance, the group finds the felimia's lair behind a magic mirror. Inside, they find a magically locked trunk that belonged to the resistance and open it with the password given to them. Inside the trunk are a moonlantern, moonstone, a cloak, and a magic dagger. The cloak is revealed to be an invisibility cloak that allows the wearer to turn invisible to normal people and gives them the ability to see the felimia. The resistance member dons the cloak, sees the invisible felimia standing right next to them, and attacks her with the dagger. He chases her into a room of mirrors. The party kills the felimia in the room of mirrors when they light the moonstone and place it into the lantern. After completing the sidequest, the underground resistance is forever grateful to your group and later aids you when you are framed for murder.

Out in the countryside, near the dwarven mines, there is a set of boots embedded in stone. When the party grasps it, they are transported to a mouthless cavern deep in the mountains and are confronted by a nameless warrior who was wearing the set of boots. He acknowledges that the party is after his magical boots, and tells them that he has been seeking death but cannot die by his own hands. As a warrior, he challenges the party to a fight for the boots. Upon killing him, he dies with a relieved smile and the party takes the pair of boots from him.

A sidequest comes up when the party investigates the sunken ship of Riva's harbor. The party is immediately attacked by a group of merpeople with tridents when they enter the water. After fighting them off, they encounter a second group of merpeople. If the party decide not to attack this second group, they are revealed to be friendly and escort the party to see the merking at their palace. The merking tells the party that some of his people have been under some evil influence since another ship sank in the harbor; he asks them to investigate and solve the problem. If the party accepts, the merking will also mention that his daughter feels that one member of the party has an extreme attraction to her and would like to reciprocate the feelings. If her feelings are accepted, the merprincess joins the party, which prevents them from being attacked by merpeople. In the depths of the second sunken ship, the party finds bottles of alcohol that line the supply room. If the alcohol is destroyed, all attacks by enraged merpeople will stop. When the party reports back to the palace, the merking mentions that the merprincess and the party member feel even closer than before. He offers the party member a life under the sea in his court: If the party accepts, the party member with the greatest charisma leaves the group with the merprincess; if they refuse, the party acknowledges that the current quest is more important and bid a fond farewell to the merfolk. In either case, the merprincess leaves the party.

== Reception ==
Reception

Review scores
Publication	Score
Next Generation	4/5
PC Gamer (UK)	79%
PC Gamer (US)	88%
Computer Games Magazine	4/5
PC PowerPlay	84%
Computer Game Entertainment	87/100

According to Die Zeit, all three games in the Realms of Arkania series, including Shadows over Riva, were commercially and critically successful. Riva alone sold over 400,000 units by 2008. The paper's Nicole Lange reported in 2011 that the three Realms of Arkania entries together had surpassed 2.4 million sales worldwide.

In PC Gamer US, Michael Wolf wrote: "We roleplaying gamers are lucky — other RPGs slated for release this year will probably have better graphics, more intuitive interfaces, and more non-linear adventuring. But this one still has everything a real RPG fan could want." Steve Faragher of PC Gamer UK praised the game as a return to form for its genre, writing that it captured the "good ol' role-playing feel that's so desperately unpopular with games designers today".

A reviewer for Next Generation criticized the game's reuse of combat mechanics and graphical assets from Star Trail, but believed that "the story line makes it all worth playing". The writer concluded that "[r]ole-playing gamers will definitely be able to sink their teeth into this one." Robert Mayer of Computer Games Strategy Plus called the game "a ray of sunlight for fantasy gamers" and "a winner, a solid statistics-based RPG in an era of lightweight imitations".

In Computer Gaming World, Scorpia called Shadows over Riva "yet another of those products that aggravate me more than outright turkeys" due to the design of its final sequence and ending. However, she believed that the game was "still manna for a CRPG-starved gaming public", and worthwhile for those who overlooked its flaws. PC PowerPlay's David Wildgoose lauded the game as "a cracking good adventure" with "great character interaction and conversation", but found fault with its "unnecessary" reliance on statistics. Andy Backer of Computer Game Entertainment called Shadows over Riva a "solid and satisfactory" experience that fans of the genre "will undoubtedly welcome ... with open arms."
