= Realms of Arkania: Star Trail =

1994 video game

- Developer: Attic Entertainment Software
- Publishers: GER: Fantasy Productions; EU: U.S. Gold; NA: Sir-Tech
- Designer: Hans-Jürgen Brändle
- Composer: Guido Henkel
- Series: The Dark Eye
- Platform: PC (MS-DOS)
- Release: GER: September 1994; WW: October 1994
- Genre: Role-playing
- Mode: Single player

Realms of Arkania: Star Trail is a computer role-playing game by Attic Entertainment Software based on the German RPG system Das Schwarze Auge. The original German version of the game (German title: Das Schwarze Auge: Sternenschweif) was released in 1994. Due to the success of its predecessor Realms of Arkania: Blade of Destiny, it was translated to English and released by Sir-Tech in the same year. An expansion, Speech Pack, was released in 1994 for the floppy disk version.

The game was re-released in 2014 for Steam with support for Windows.

== Plot ==
After the failed orc invasion on Thorwal, the orcs attacked another region. The player is recruited in the city Kvirasim by an elf ambassador, Elsurion Starlight, to recover an old artifact, the Salamander Stone, that could unite the elves and the dwarfs for battle against the orcs. Immediately a mysterious third party which seems to be against the uniting of the dwarves and elves counter offers riches and bribery. The quest leads them first to the depths of a long abandoned dwarven mine in the mountains. There they must walk a fine line between taking what they need and taking out of avarice. If successful they meet a master smith, who forges an asthenil sword for them and lets them swap it for the Salamander Stone.

Leaving the mines with the Salamander Stone, they are instructed to take the stone to an orc besieged city of Lowangen. The party is allowed past the orcish blockade, only after they leave behind most of their heavy weapons and armor. Once inside the city, they are robbed of the Salamander Stone. While attempting to locate it the group runs into cultists serving an unknown god. The cult comprises humans and elves. After a bloody fight, the group finds two Salamander Stones, one fake and one genuine. There is a notice of instruction telling the cult to send the real one off to the north to their leader.

The group travels to the northernmost city on the map and finds it completely deserted. Upon entering one house they find a trap door leading below the house to an underground base of the cult. Within its first floor, they find a warrioress frozen in a solid block of ice. She joins the group after the player character thaws her out but leaves as the party moves to the third and final floor.

On the last floor is a temple to the Nameless God. At the very back the party finds the dwarven ambassador, Ingramosch, petrified in stone and the mysterious third party that first tried to offer them riches for the Salamander Stone. He is actually a powerful sorcerer. After taunting the party, he casts a spell that teleports him to the massive cave behind him. A huge dragon comes forth and starts breathing flames at the party. After battling the party for some time, the dragon finds them honorable and allows them to live. As he disappears into his cave, the player character uses the salamander stone to flesh spell upon Ingramosch. They climb out of the dungeon and find the elven ambassador waiting with a horse-drawn carriage. He takes the party to the harbor where a boat is waiting. The elf spends days healing the dwarf with magic. When Ingramosch comes to, they give him the Salamander Stone.

After arriving at the tree city of the elves, the dwarves and elves hammer out an alliance. In celebration, the group is treated to a feast in the tree city, where the rarely seen elf king shows up and thanks the group for all its success and hails them as friends forever to elves everywhere.

== Reception ==
Reception

Review scores
Publication	Score
Computer Gaming World	3 out of 5
Dragon	2.5 out of 5; 3 out of 5
Next Generation	3 out of 5
PC Gamer (US)	88%
PC Zone	85 out of 100
Electronic Entertainment	4 out of 5
Computer Player	8 out of 10

Awards
Publication	Award
PC Gamer US	Best Role-playing Game 1994
Computer Games Strategy Plus	Best Multi-Character Role-Playing Game

According to Die Zeit, all three games in the Realms of Arkania series, including Star Trail, were commercially and critically successful. The paper's Nicole Lange reported in 2011 that the three entries together had surpassed 2.4 million sales worldwide.

The game was reviewed in 1995 in Dragon #219 by Jay & Dee in the "Eye of the Monitor" column. Jay gave the game 2½ out of 5 stars, while Dee gave the game 3 stars. A reviewer for Next Generation assessed that "The return of the old-school RPG, Sir Tech's Star Trail is sure to appeal to those gamers who would lose months at a time fighting evil. Unfortunately, even with its new control system (reminiscent of New World's Might and Magic series), graphics, and sound that far outclass those of Wizardry, the game may be too complex for the beginning adventure to tackle."

James V. Trunzo reviewed Realms of Arkania: Star Trail in White Wolf Inphobia #54 (April, 1995), rating it a 4 out of 5 and stated that "Star Trail is so flexible that it even allows you to switch between difficulty levels at any time. You can start the game on Easy until your characters make some advances and then move up to a more challenging level."

Barry Brenesal of Electronic Entertainment praised it as "a first-class fantasy role-playing game that should keep you busy for a long, long time." PC Zone's Mark Burgess called Star Trail "a must" for fans of the genre, and summarized it as "slightly old-fashioned looking, but it's got what it takes." In Computer Player, Al Giovetti wrote that the game was "recommended for role-playing enthusiasts", and he praised its graphics, automap and journal features, interface, complexity and audio.

Writing for PC Gamer US, Trent C. Ward called Star Trail "a must for every diehard RPG enthusiast", and "a great title for those who're tired of adventure games masquerading as RPGs". Computer Gaming World's Petra Schlunk wrote that Star Trail was "a deep and rich game, though it can be overly so at times." She regarded it as "a game for the hardest of hard-core role players—those who will fight anything, even a frustrating game system, to finish a quest."

Star Trail received PC Gamer's 1994 "Best Role-playing Game" award, and was named the year's top "Multi-Character Role-Playing Game" by Computer Games Strategy Plus. It was also a nominee for Computer Gaming World's "Role-Playing Game of the Year" prize, which went to The Elder Scrolls: Arena. The editors of Computer Gaming World called it an improvement upon Blade of Destiny that was "well-suited for hard-core role-players", while those of PC Gamer US wrote, "Never before, nor since, has a RPG contained as much depth or player control as this one". In 1997, PC Gamer US named Star Trail the 47th best game of all time, calling it "an achievement of RPG greatness".

== Legacy ==
=== Sequel ===
Realms of Arkania: Star Trail is the second game in The Northlands Trilogy following Realms of Arkania: Blade of Destiny. The third game, Realms of Arkania: Shadows over Riva, was released in 1996. Players can save the game after beating Star Trail, which allows them to import their characters into the sequel.

=== Remake ===
A full 3D remake, developed by the Austrian developer, Crafty Studios, and published by German firm, United Independent Entertainment, was released on Steam PC on August 10, 2017; PlayStation 4 on June 26, 2018; and Xbox One on January 30, 2019.
