= Attic Entertainment Software =

German video game developer

Attic Entertainment Software GmbH
- Type: GmbH
- Industry: Video game development, publishing
- Founded: September 1990
- Defunct: 2001
- Headquarters: Albstadt, Baden-Württemberg
- Key people: Guido Henkel; Hans-Jürgen Brändle; Jochen Hamma
- Products: Realms of Arkania series
- Owner: Jochen Hamma
- Website: www.attic.de (web.archive.org)

The Attic Entertainment Software GmbH was a German video game developer and publisher that was founded in September 1990 by Hans-Jürgen Brändle, Jochen Hamma and Guido Henkel in Albstadt, Baden-Württemberg. Attic has been inactive since 2001. The founder, Hans-Jürgen Brändle, was reported to have died in Las Vegas during the month of August, 2005.

Attic's breakthrough was the so-called Northlands Trilogy (Realms of Arkania: Blade of Destiny, Realms of Arkania: Star Trail and Realms of Arkania: Shadows over Riva), a series of role-playing video games based upon the popular German tabletop role-playing game The Dark Eye.

== List of games ==
- 1990 - Lords of Doom (Amiga, Atari ST, C64, MS-DOS)
- 1991 - The Oath (Amiga)
- 1991 - Spirit of Adventure (Amiga, Atari ST, C64, MS-DOS)
- 1991 - Drachen von Laas (Amiga, MS-DOS)
- 1993 - Realms of Arkania: Blade of Destiny (Amiga, MS-DOS)
- 1994 - Realms of Arkania: Star Trail (MS-DOS)
- 1995 - Fears (Amiga) publisher only
- 1995 - Druid: Daemons of the Mind (MS-DOS) German: Der Druidenzirkel: Im Netz der Träume
- 1997 - Herrscher der Meere (MS-DOS)
- 1997 - Realms of Arkania: Shadows over Riva (MS-DOS)

=== Unreleased ===
- The Lady, the Mage and the Knight (with Larian Studios)
