= The Dark Eye (role-playing game) =

Fantasy tabletop role-playing game

- Designers: Ulrich Kiesow et al.
- Publishers: Schmidt Spiele (1984–1997); Fantasy Productions (1997–2007); Ulisses Spiele (2007–)
- Publication: 1984 (1st edition); 1988 (2nd edition); 1993 (3rd edition); 2001 (4th edition); 2006 (4.1); 2015 (5th edition)
- Genres: Fantasy
- Systems: Custom
- First released in English as Realms of Arkania (novels and role-playing video games only) from 1993 to 1997. The first English edition of RPG rules was published in 2003.

The Dark Eye (German: Das Schwarze Auge, lit. 'The Black Eye') is a German tabletop role-playing game with a high fantasy theme created by Ulrich Kiesow and launched by Schmidt Spiel & Freizeit GmbH and Droemer Knaur Verlag in 1984. It is the most successful role-playing game on the German market, outselling Dungeons & Dragons, and has the largest body of official publications for a single game world of any role-playing game. The English edition of The Dark Eye is published by Ulisses US, an official subsidiary of the current German publisher Ulisses Spiele Germany. The Dark Eye is also published in various other languages.

== History ==
Droemer Knaur dropped the project in early 1989; after the bankruptcy of the Schmidt Spiel & Freizeit GmbH in 1997, publishing was continued by Fantasy Productions (which had already done all the editorial work). Since the game's launch, it has gone through five editions, making the rules and background more complex. The basic rules of the fourth edition of The Dark Eye were published in 2001, and it became the first edition to be released in English in October 2003. The fifth edition of the game was released in August 2015, with an English translation released in November 2016.

== Aventuria ==
Aventuria, the continent on which most of the game is set, was first introduced to the English-language market through a series of computer games and novels and later under the name Realms of Arkania. The trademark Realms of Arkania was owned by the now-defunct Sir-tech Software, Inc., which spurred the name change to The Dark Eye; Fantasy Productions was unable to obtain the trademark. In April 2007, Ulisses Spiele assumed the TDE pen-and-paper licence from Fantasy Productions. Aventuria and the wider game world of TDE has the largest body of official publications - sourcebooks, maps, etc. - of any game-world for a role-playing game. It is continuously being expanded and features an officially recorded 80+ year history in which two years of game-time take place in one calendar year.

== Game history ==
=== First edition (1984) ===
Logo of the first edition

The first German edition, released in 1984, was translated into Dutch (Het Oog des Meesters), French (L'Œil noir) and Italian (Uno sguardo nel buio), but not into English. It has a very simple class and level system. It was published in Das Schwarze Auge—Abenteuer Basis-Spiel ("The Dark Eye—Adventure Base Game"). Advanced rules were published in 1985 in the book Abenteuer Ausbau-Spiel—Zusatzausrüstung für alle Abenteuer ("Extended adventure—Additional equipment for all adventures").

==== Character ====
The character (called "Hero" in the rules) is defined by five qualities (or attributes): Mut (courage), Klugheit (wisdom), Charisma (charisma), Geschicklichkeit (agility) and Körperkraft (strength). They are determined by 1d6+7 in dice notation (8–13). The weight the character can carry is equal to strength × 100 ounces (1 aventurian ounce is 25 g).

The player can choose five different character types (or classes): adventurer, warrior, dwarf, elf and mage. All characters can be adventurers, but there are attribute conditions that must be met before accessing the other types (for example, a warrior must have at least 12 in both courage and strength).

During the adventures, the character gains adventure points; with a sufficient number of adventure points, they can go to the next level. When attaining a new level the character can increase an attribute by one point, and either the attack or parry value by one point; they also win vitality points equal to one dice roll, or vitality or astral energy points equal to one dice roll for elves and mages. The extended rules add a sixth quality to the hero's definition: stamina. The initial stamina is the sum of the force and vitality points. Stamina represents resistance to exhaustion; it decreases when the hero makes physical efforts such as running, swimming and fighting.

The extended rules also provide four more classes that can be chosen during the creation of the character, or sometimes as an evolution of an adventurer or dwarf: rider, druid, priest or wood elf. It introduces the aptitudes (skills) that are chances to manage definite actions (such as horseback riding or camouflage), whereas the qualities are generic indicators. The aptitudes range between 0 and 18 (and are tested with a d20 in dice notation). They have a base value (some are part of the culture, or are simple tasks). When the character reaches a new level, the player can distribute 10 points to raise the aptitudes. The base value and the cost to increase depend on the type of hero (riding is easier for a warrior than for a mage); the cost also depends on the current aptitude level.

==== Health ====
The character type determines the starting value of vitality points (from 20 for a mage to 35 for a dwarf). This is to be compared with the 1d6+4 (dice notation) damage points inflicted by a sword.

In the extended rules, stamina plays a role in the healing of diseases (such as a fever); when it is 20 or more spontaneous healing is possible, and it is faster when stamina is above 25.

==== Resolution of actions ====
Actions are resolved by testing the attributes; the action succeeds when:

1d20 ≤ attribute + modifier

The modifier is positive when the action is difficult, and negative when it is easy. The extended rules introduce the aptitudes, which are tested in the same way as the qualities.

==== Combat ====
In fights, the characters act in decreasing order of initiative (the character with the highest initiative acts first). Characters have attack and parry values determined by various other values. Typical attack/parry values for a new character are in the range of 14/12 (for fighters) to something like 6/8 (dedicated non-fighters, such as priests of the goddess Tsa). When the attack test of the attacker is successful and the defender misses the parry test, the defender loses the number of vitality points equal to the damage of the weapon minus the protection rating of the armor (chain mail has a protection rating of four, and knight armour has six). When the attacker rolls one or two on the die, they make a master hit; the maximum damage is inflicted, and the armour does not protect.

The extended rules provide for miniature figures which allow a finer representation of movement, with (for example) the possibility to push back an enemy. They also offer various possibilities such as fleeing, charging and successive attacks from the same fighter (assault). They replace the master hit with the notions of good attack (the attacker makes a throw equal to or less than the good attack score, as shown on a table in relation to her attack score) and good parry (five points less than the parry score with the d20 in dice notation). A good attack not parried by a good parry implies a serious (or critical) impact (throw 1d20 and read the result on a table). When the attack or parry-test die shows 20, this can lead to a fumble. The extended rules also allow dodging thrown weapons, introduce specific rules for empty-hand and horseback fighting and infection (fever) for wounds.

==== Magic ====
Elves, druids, shamans, witches and mages can cast spells and have astral energy points; the starting value of astral energy points depends on the attribute values the hero has when created. When a spell is cast, the character loses the astral energy points corresponding to the spell.

The extended rules introduce new spells. From the fifth level on, it is no longer necessary to speak the words to cast the spell. These rules also describe spells for the druids and wood elves, and priests' miracles: manifestations of the priest's god, which are similar to magic spells. The priests do not have astral energy but karma, which works the same way.

=== First-edition advanced rules (The Sword Masters, 1988) ===
Two sets, DSA-Professional: Schwertmeister Set 1 ("TDE Professional—Sword Masters Set I") and DSA-Professional II—das Fest der Schwertmeister ("TDE Professional II—The Sword Masters' Feast"), were published in 1988 and 1989. This edition was published as advanced rules for the first edition, but is sometimes erroneously considered the second edition. Combat rules are much more elaborate, introducing a hit-location system.

It was written for advanced-level characters (typically level 15). The sets describe a new world: Tharun (pronounced "taroon"), a hollow world. It is the inside of Ethra, lightened by a central sun. Nine archipelagos constitute the realm of this world. A pantheon of nine deities rules over the inhabitants. Divine runes (one of the only sources of magic which can be used by magicians and druids) are scattered all over the world. The sets also provide a divine quest. A third set of campaigns was planned, but has not been released. The Tharun setting was abandoned, but it is said that the world and its pantheon still exist; some deities are worshiped in Myranor.

=== Second edition (1988) ===
The second edition was published in 1988. The character is defined by the same five positive attributes (qualities) as in the first edition, as well as five new negative ones: Aberglaube (superstition), Höhenangst (acrophobia), Raumangst (claustrophobia), Goldgier (avarice) and Totenangst (necrophobia). The positive attributes are determined by 1d6+7 in dice notation (8–13), and the negative by 1d6+1 (2–7). The player can choose from over 40 different character types (classes). Again, there are attributes (conditions) to access the types. A character also features over 80 skills, called "talents"; the use of a talent requires testing three attributes, and the character is able to cast over 100 (11×11) spells.

=== Third edition and Realms of Arkania (1993) ===
The third edition (1993) was used (with a few limitations) to power the three Realms of Arkania computer games: RoA: Blade of Destiny (1993), Attic/Sir-Tech), RoA: Star Trail (1994, Attic/Sir-Tech) and RoA: Shadows over Riva (1997, Attic/Sir-Tech). Realms of Arkania was also the name of three translated novels: RoA: The Charlatan (January 1996, ISBN 0-7615-0233-5), RoA: The Lioness (March 1996, ISBN 0-7615-0477-X) and RoA: The Sacrifice (September 1996, ISBN 0-7615-0476-1).

The rules are similar to the second edition except for two additional positive attributes: Fingerfertigkeit (dexterity) and Intuition (intuition); and two additional negative attributes: Neugier (curiosity) and Jähzorn (violent temper). The character is thus defined by seven positive and seven negative attributes (qualities), and this edition uses the same system of talents.

=== Fourth edition (2001) ===
The fourth edition of The Dark Eye supports a great variety of character choices. Where the older editions forced the player to create a character along very strict lines, the fourth edition is flexible and the player can choose from hundreds of different character classes and cultural backgrounds. The creation rules are somewhat similar to those of Shadowrun (also published by Fantasy Productions) and even more to GURPS. One reason for this development is the large community of professional authors and enthusiastic players, which have helped to define the continent of Aventuria over the last 20 years. Character generation is based on "generation points" from which a race, a culture and a profession must be "paid". The points are also used for attributes and other skills. After generation, the gained "adventure points" for each adventure can be used for equipping the character with skills. Consequently, the systems intends to balance power levels of different character classes.

The fourth edition was also translated into English. Three books are available in English (all published 2006):

- Basic Rules (ISBN 1-932564-02-0)
- Secret of the Blue Tower / Witching Hour (ISBN 1-932564-05-5)
- World of Aventuria (ISBN 1-932564-06-3)

=== Fifth edition (2015) ===
Ulisses started development of the fifth edition in the beginning of 2014. Its development involved a players poll and parts of the publishers internet forum are dedicated to that topic. The beta version (in German) was released 10 May 2014 and can be freely downloaded. The final German version is available as of 31 July 2015. The publisher also created a website concerning the progress of the English version. The English translation was released in November 2016.

== Setting ==
=== Aventuria ===
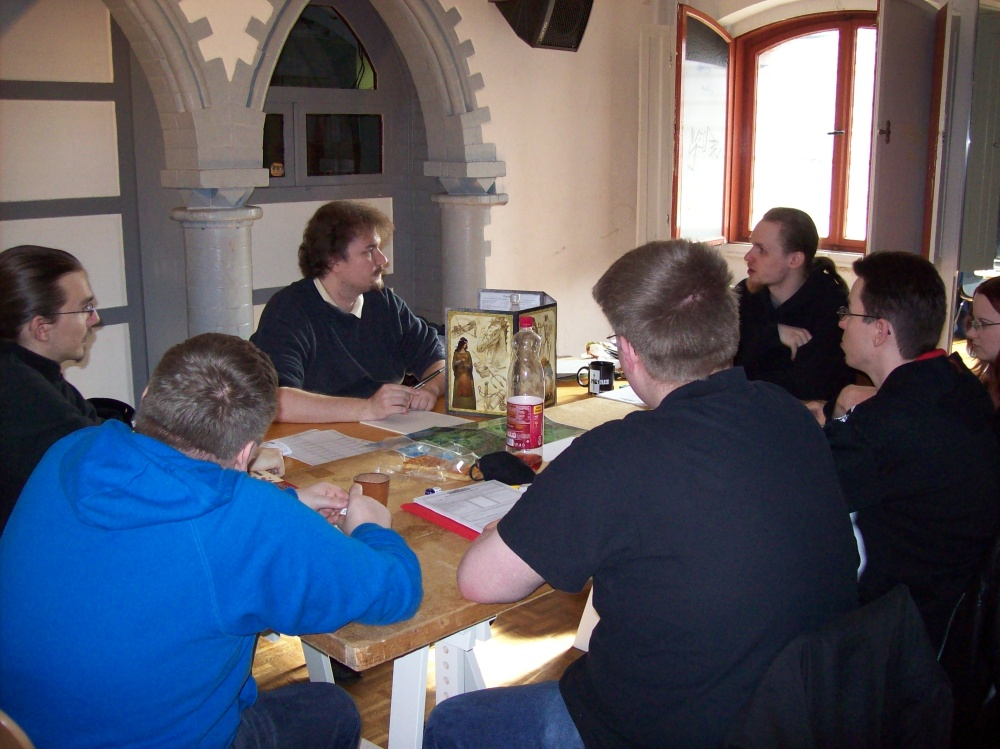
The Dark Eye role-playing gamers at Convention Burg-Con in Berlin, 2009

The Dark Eye is set in the fantasy realm of Aventuria. During the 1990s, it was first translated as "Arkania", but the name was later changed to one closer to the original German name. Aventuria is a continent of the planet Ethra (an anagram of "Earth", as the planet's name in the German edition, Dere, is an anagram of Erde, the German word for "Earth"). The other continents of Ethra are Myranor (also called "Gyldenland" in Aventuria), Uthuria and Vaestenland.

=== Tharun ===
Tharun was envisioned as the inner side of Ethra, which was supposed to be a hollow world. It is lit by a central sun which also annihilates the usual magic. In today's ingame theory Tharun is a so-called "Globule", a place in another Sphere of reality – or an alternate dimension (although this explanation is very simplified).

The original sun, Glost, was the work of Guerimm, the god of fire. New gods appeared and started to oppose the twelve gods of Aventuria. One of them, Arkan'Zim, destroyed Glost, and another new god, Sindayri, created a new sun, aiming to reduce the influence of the twelve gods in the hollow world. The splinters of Glost were spread everywhere. The inhabitants picked them and drew runes on them. They thus became runestones; the combination of three runestones can lead to the liberation of the energy of Glost, allowing a new magic. Tharun is linked to the surface of Ethra by a double-sided volcano. The upper side is on an island 1,400 km west from Havena, the other side is upside down, and is situated in Tharun on the isle of Hamur. The society is a military dictatorship, with a caste of Sword Masters ruling the rest of the population.

=== Myranor ===
Myranor or Gyldenland (In the original Güldenland, meaning "Golden country") is a large continent west of Aventuria. It was first described in 1990 and released as a separate RPG in 2000. Initially, it was used to play-test an early version of what came to be The Dark Eye 4th edition rules.

In contrast to Aventuria, the setting is high fantasy. There are gigantic Metropolis, flying ships and cities, several races unknown to aventurians including cat-like humanoids and intelligent insects, as well as a country leached by its vampire-like, skull god "Draydalān" worshiping population. The continent is huge and parts of it still are unexplored. While most of Aventuria is set in the central European Middle Ages, Myranor is based on a mixture of classic Greek/Roman as well as medieval Asian background. One notable political structure is a huge empire that has been in degeneration for millennia. At its height, it had been the origin of modern civilization in Aventuria, and the area it still controls is larger than Aventuria itself. In its early years, the empire was controlled by mighty three-eyed wizards called "the old ones", who disappeared thousands of years ago.

After its initial release in 2000, only one additional rule book, one regional description and six adventures were released. After those, nothing further was released for Myranor. Two fans, however, revised Myranor to be played with the "final" 4th edition rules with FanPro's permission. These new rules were released as a hardcover book in January 2006. On 20 January 2007 Ulisses Spiele announced that they would be handling future publications related to Myranor.

=== Creatures ===
==== Humans ====
There are three human groups, and several smaller cultures:

- Middenrealmers: from Gyldenland, they landed on the west coast and spread to the centre of Aventuria.
  - Andergastans (template: A satirically exaggerated version of the Kingdom of Bavaria and the Archduchy of Austria)
  - Bornlanders (template: Russia at the end of the Middle Ages)
  - Cyclopeans (template: Ancient Greece and Roman Empire)
  - Horasians (template: Italy and France, between the Baroque and the Renaissance)
  - Maraskans (template: Asia—an amalgam of Middenrealmers and Tulamydes)
  - Middenrealmers (template: Germany in the time of Holy Roman Empire in the Middle Ages)
  - Northern-Aventurians (template: )
  - Nostrians (template: A satirically exaggerated version of Kingdom of Prussia)
  - Southern-Aventurians (template: Early colonial Latin America and the Caribbean during the Golden Age of Piracy)
  - Svellters (template: A medieval version of the American frontier)
- Tulamydes: natives of Aventuria, probably from the Rashtul Wall; they spread to the south of Aventuria;
  - Mhanadistanians (template: caricature of the golden age of Arab civilisation)
  - Novadis (template: Bedouin): nomadic people of the desert of Khom;
- Thorwalians (template: Vikings): coming from Hjaldingard in Gyldenland, they settled in northwest Aventuria
- Norbards (template: petty, travelling east-European traders with some allusions to Ashkenazi Jews): an amalgam of Middenrealmers and Tulamydes
- Smaller groups, all indigenous to Aventuria:
  - Nivese (template: Sami)
  - Forest Folk and Utulus, collectively called Mohas (template: Indigenous peoples of the Americas)

==== Elves ====
- Forest Elves: fairy-like elves, living mostly in a large wood called the Salamander Stones. They are worldly yet innocent, and dislike humans.
- Firn Elves: live in the north, in perpetual ice; for them, life is a hard struggle.
- Meadow Elves: live throughout the northern half of Aventuria along rivers; open-minded, they sometimes live in human cities.
- Veld Elves: horsemen from the grasslands of northeast Aventuria; they have loose contact with humans and Goblins.

The Elves are indigenous cultures, and generally do not believe in gods. Unbeknownst to most Elves, Firn, Meadow and Veld Elves once had a single common culture (like that of Tolkien's elves).

==== Dwarves ====
- Ore Dwarves: conservative, concerned with etiquette
- Anvil Dwarves: aggressive and stubborn
- Brilliant Dwarves: artistic
- Hill Dwarves: similar to Tolkien's Hobbits, but here considered Dwarves

==== Other ====
- Ogres: giants of great strength, these simple-minded, strong creatures are often found in the company of Orcs, swinging large wooden clubs lopped off trees. Common to all Ogres is the consumption of nearly everything they encounter.
- Orks: black-coated, monkey-like species native to the veld ("ork land") in northwest Aventuria, with a culture similar to the Orcs of Warcraft
- Holberker: a mix between elves and orcs, found only in few areas
- Goblins: smaller relatives of the Orks, with red-brown fur, living mostly in northeastern Aventuria. Goblins are second in numbers only to the humans.
- Achaz: lizard-men, whose ancient culture is now destroyed
- Trolls: large, burly creatures living in the Troll Mountains. Intelligent, they hint at an ancient trollish civilization predating all others.

== Novels ==
- Realms of Arkania: The Charlatan by Ulrich Kiesow, January 1996, ISBN 0-7615-0233-5 (Das Schwarze Auge: Der Scharlatan)
- Realms of Arkania: The Lioness by Ina Kramer, March 1996, ISBN 0-7615-0477-X (Das Schwarze Auge: Die Löwin von Neetha)
- Realms of Arkania: The Sacrifice by Ina Kramer, September 1996, ISBN 0-7615-0476-1 (Das Schwarze Auge: Thalionmels Opfer)

== Video games ==
Release timeline
1992	Blade of Destiny
1993
1994	Star Trail
1995
1996	Shadows over Riva
1997
1998
1999
2000
2001
2002
2003
2004
2005
2006
2007
2008	Drakensang
2009
2010	The River of Time
2011	Drakensang Online
2012	Chains of Satinav
2013	Blade of Destiny (2013 remake)
2013	Memoria
2013	Demonicon
2014	Blackguards
2014	Skilltree Saga
2015	Blackguards 2
2016
2017	Star Trail (2017 remake)
2018
2019
2020	Book of Heroes (announced in 2019)
2021
2022	Forgotten Fables: Wolves on the Westwind

- Realms of Arkania: Blade of Destiny (Das Schwarze Auge: Die Schicksalsklinge)
- Realms of Arkania: Star Trail (Das Schwarze Auge: Sternenschweif)
- Realms of Arkania: Shadows over Riva (Das Schwarze Auge: Schatten über Riva)
- The Dark Eye: Drakensang (Das Schwarze Auge: Drakensang)
- The Dark Eye: The River of Time (Das Schwarze Auge: Am Fluss der Zeit)
  - Phileasson's Secret (Phileassons Geheimnis)
- Drakensang Online
- The Dark Eye: Chains of Satinav (Das Schwarze Auge: Satinavs Ketten)
- Realms of Arkania: Blade of Destiny (2013 remake) (Das Schwarze Auge: Die Schicksalsklinge)
  - For the Gods (Für die Götter)
  - Ogredeath (Ogertod)
  - With Blade and Brilliance (Mit Schwert und Scharfsinn)
- The Dark Eye: Memoria (Das Schwarze Auge: Memoria)
- The Dark Eye: Demonicon (Das Schwarze Auge: Demonicon)
- The Dark Eye: Blackguards (Das Schwarze Auge: Blackguards)
  - Untold Legends (Untold Legends)
- The Dark Eye: Skilltree Saga (Das Schwarze Auge: Skilltree Saga)
- The Dark Eye: Blackguards 2 (Das Schwarze Auge: Blackguards 2)
- Realms of Arkania: Star Trail (2017 remake) (Das Schwarze Auge: Sternenschweif)
- The Dark Eye: Book of Heroes (Das Schwarze Auge: Book of Heroes)
- Forgotten Fables: Wolves on the Westwind

== Mobile adventure series and browser games ==
- The Dark Eye: Herokon Online (Das Schwarze Auge: Herokon Online)
- The Dark Eye: Nedime: The Caliph's Daughter (Das Schwarze Auge: Nedime: Die Tochter des Kalifen)
- The Dark Eye: Secret of The Cyclopes (Das Schwarze Auge: Das Geheimnis der Zyklopen)
- The Dark Eye: Swamp of Doom (Das Schwarze Auge: Sumpf des Verderbens)
- The Dark Eye: Among Pirates (Das Schwarze Auge: Unter Piraten)
- The Dark Eye: Crypt Raiders (Das Schwarze Auge: Die Grabräuber)
- The Dark Eye: Dragon Raid (Das Schwarze Auge: Drachenfeuer)
- The Dark Eye: Arena (Das Schwarze Auge: Arena)

== Other games ==
- A trading card game, Dark Force (Dark Force: Duell um Aventurien)
- Aventuria Adventure Card Game

=== Dark World Board Games ===
A board game and two expansion games were released based on the Dark Eye gaming system:

  - Dark World: The Castle of Secrets (Das Schwarze Auge: Die Burg des Schreckens) (released as simply Dark World in the US)
  - Dark World: Village of Fear (Das Schwarze Auge: Dorf des Grauens)
  - Dark World: Dragon's Gate (Das Schwarze Auge: Tal des Drachens)

The games are three-dimensional, where features and structures were built on top of the board, and could also be interacted with the character pieces. The games revolve around a group of Heroes' battles against a snake sorcerer named Korak and his minions. The original Dark World game has the Heroes fight through Korak's castle. The Village of Fear expansion game requires the Heroes to rescue two townsfolk to retrieve the keys to enter the castle. In the Dragon's Gate expansion, the heroes must get past the Dragon Golgorath before they can enter the town. Four players can play each game as the Heroes, while a fifth player plays the role of Korak and controls all his monsters.

The Heroes have a corresponding color on their bases. Each game has a shaker or tokens which determine the order of play for each player for each round. The Hero pieces are also designed to hold interchangeable weapons-a base weapon, and a later, more-powerful gold weapon. Heroes are awarded points based upon collecting certain items, and defeating enemies. Special dice with scimitars inscribed on them are used for combat. The winner is the Hero with the most points at the end of the game or the player playing as Korak wins if all the Heroes are defeated.

== Reviews ==
- Casus Belli #30 (Jan 1986)
- Casus Belli #32 (Apr 1986)
- Jeux & Stratégie #36 (as "L'Œil Noir")
