= Blackguards =

2014 video game

- Developer: Daedalic Entertainment
- Publisher: Daedalic Entertainment
- Series: The Dark Eye
- Platforms: Microsoft Windows, OS X
- Release: 24 January 2014
- Genres: Turn-based tactics, tactical role-playing
- Mode: Single-player

Blackguards (German: Das Schwarze Auge: Blackguards) is a 2014 tactical role-playing game for Microsoft Windows and OS X. It was developed by German game developer Daedalic Entertainment, makers of adventure games like The Whispered World, and distributed by EuroVideo. It is based on the leading German pen and paper role-playing game The Dark Eye. Due to the successful reception of the game, Daedalic Entertainment released a sequel, Blackguards 2. A definitive edition was released in 2016 for Xbox One and PlayStation 4.

== Plot ==
=== Story ===
Blackguards is set in the fictional continent of Aventuria within the Empire of Horasia. The player controls the protagonist, who tries to solve the murder of a princess, with the help of various characters he meets during his long journey. There are five protagonists the player controls in varying party combinations: a dwarven bootlegger, a decadent black magician, a witch, an indigenous gladiator, and a drug-addicted half-elf hunter.

== Development and release ==
On 4 March 2014 the DLC Blackguards: Untold Legends added seven quests relating to one of the protagonists, four weapons, eleven battle maps, and 25 tracks.

== Reception ==
Reception

Aggregate score
Aggregator	Score
Metacritic	68/100

Review scores
Publication	Score
Eurogamer	8/10
GameSpot	7.7/10
IGN	7.8/10

By September 2014, Blackguards had become Daedalic's highest-grossing game. It remained in this position by 2016, which the company's Carsten Fichtelmann attributed to "a high rate of full price sales", compared to the greater sales quantity but lower revenue of the Deponia series. Blackguards received mixed reviews, Metacritic gave 68/100 from 48 reviews. For instance IGN's Rowan Kaiser rated the game 7.8/10 and concluded: "Good. Except for its muddled progression system, tactical RPG Blackguards gets a lot of things right."

Tony Vilgotsky of Russian magazine Mir Fantastiki rated this game 8/10 and said that "deepness, enthrallment and atmosphere make this game interesting not only for turn-based RPGs' lovers and fantasy adventures' fans but for very wide circle of gamers".
