= The Oath (video game) =

1991 video game

- Developer: Attic Entertainment
- Publisher: Attic Entertainment
- Designers: Sascha Jungnickel; Jonathan Small
- Programmer: Jonathan Small
- Artist: Sascha Jungnickel
- Composer: Rudolf Stember
- Platform: Amiga
- Release: 1991
- Genre: Scrolling shooter
- Mode: Single-player

The Oath is a horizontally scrolling shooter programmed by Jonathan Small with art by Sascha Jungnickel and published by Attic Entertainment Software for the Amiga in 1991.

== Plot ==
the female pilot Atras wants to join a mercenary group but has to pass a test first

== Reception ==
The Oath received mostly positive reviews, including being given the scores of 50% from Amiga Action, 74% from Amiga Joker, 76% from Génération 4, 85% from Joystick, and 70% from Power Play.
