= Spirit of Adventure (video game) =

1991 video game

- Developer(s): Attic Entertainment
- Publisher(s): Starbyte Software
- Platform(s): Amiga, Atari ST Commodore 64, MS-DOS
- Release: February 12, 1991
- Genre(s): Role-playing, dungeon crawl
- Mode(s): Single-player

Spirit of Adventure is a computer role playing game developed by Attic Entertainment Software and published February 12, 1991. The game is a 2.5D dungeon crawl.
