= Drakensang: The River of Time =

2010 video game

- Developer: Radon Labs
- Publishers: dtp entertainment (GER); THQ (NA)
- Director: Bernd Beyreuther
- Designer: Fabian Rudzinski
- Series: The Dark Eye
- Engine: Nebula Device
- Platform: Microsoft Windows
- Release: GER: 19 February 2010; NA: 11 January 2011
- Genre: Role-playing
- Mode: Single-player

Drakensang: The River of Time (German: Das Schwarze Auge: Drakensang: Am Fluss der Zeit) is a role-playing video game developed by Radon Labs. It was released for Microsoft Windows in 2010 and serves as a prequel to Drakensang: The Dark Eye.

== Story ==
Though released after Drakensang: The Dark Eye, and playable as stand-alone game, in-story it serves as a prequel. The game takes place around the city of Nadoret. Nadoret lies south of the city of Ferdok, the main hub of the first installment. From Nadoret the player travels the Great River to reveal a series of pirate attacks. Over the course of the game he teams up with Ardo of Boarstock, the thief Cuano and the dwarf Forgrimm, who also appeared in Drakensang: The Dark Eye.

== Gameplay ==
Just like the original Drakensang, it has a traditional RPG party-based style, with a "real-time with pause" round-based play mode as seen in games like Baldur's Gate or Neverwinter Nights. Using a largely faithful version of the pen and paper rules, statistics, skills and talents are leveled up through universal experience points which can be applied to anything from skills which increase the amount of information found on the minimap to skills useful for combat or negotiation. The River of Time also addressed minor criticisms of the first game, such as the player's inability to return to most areas once completed.

It was released in Germany in February 2010, followed by an expansion pack called Phileasson's Secret in August 2010. It was released in English in January 2011, Phileasson's Secret in May 2011.

== Reception ==
Reception

Review score
Publication	Score
PC Gamer (US)	80%

Drakensang: The River of Time was received positively in the German press and generally praised as an improvement over the first title. It won the "Best RPG 2010" at the Deutscher Entwicklerpreis.

However, this second game of the franchise did not fare well financially, and subsequently Radon Labs were declared bankrupt and acquired by Bigpoint Games. The Drakensang brand was then turned into an online browser game franchise that no longer connects to The Dark Eye franchise.
