= Bamboo (album) =

Studio album by Pierre Estève
- Released: 1996
- Genre: Ambient, world music, contemporary folk
- Length: 56:20
- Label: Shooting Star
- Producer: Pierre Estève

Pierre Estève chronology
Bamboo (1996)	Atlantis: The Lost Tales (1997)

Bamboo is the debut album by French composer Pierre Estève and was released in 1996 by Shooting Star. It is the first album in Esteve's MADe IN series, based on matters and materials from Chinese instrument classification, followed by Metal in 2001.

== Track listing ==
All tracks are written by Pierre Estève

No.	Title	Length
1.	"Esprit de la forêt"
2.	"Le rire des bambous"
3.	"Chu"
4.	"Brothers"
5.	"L'homme aux 12 visages"
6.	"Dawn in India"
7.	"Priest of the Empty Nothing"
8.	"Tre gia mang moc"
9.	"Ecuador"
10.	"Ohe"
11.	"Flowering Mystery"
Total length:		56:20

== Personnel ==
Musicians

- Pierre Estève

== Release history ==
Region	Date	Label	Format	Catalog
France	1996	Shooting Star	CD	N/A
