= Atlantis II =

1999 video game

- Developer: Cryo Interactive
- Publishers: EU: Cryo Interactive; NA: DreamCatcher Interactive
- Director: Eric Mallet
- Producers: Rémi Herbulot, Jean-Martial Lefranc, Philippe Ulrich
- Designer: Johan Robson
- Writer: Johan Robson
- Composer: Pierre Estève
- Engine: Omni3D
- Platforms: Windows, Mac OS, iOS
- Release: November 1999
- Genre: Adventure
- Mode: Single-player

Atlantis II, known as Beyond Atlantis in North America, is a 1999 graphic adventure game developed and published by Cryo Interactive. The sequel to Atlantis: The Lost Tales, it follows the story of Ten, a mystical being that travels across time to defeat the Bearer of Dark. Players assume the role of Ten and solve puzzles in locations such as Ireland, the Yucatán Peninsula of Mexico and China.

Atlantis II was a commercial success, with sales of 180,000 units after fewer than two months of release. It ultimately sold 160,000 units in France alone, and became one of distributor Dreamcatcher Interactive's most popular titles in North America. The game was followed by Atlantis III: The New World, Atlantis Evolution and The Secrets of Atlantis: The Sacred Legacy.

== Gameplay ==
The game features a "point and click" interface, full 3D panning, puzzles of varied difficulty, conversations with other characters and a fully orchestrated musical score.

== Plot ==
A young man named Ten journeys through the mountains of Tibet. Upon finding a ship, he meets a levitating mystery man, who explains that Ten is the Bearer of Light and has to restore balance to the universe by confronting the Bearer of Dark, who resides in Shambhala. To find Shambhala, Ten must gather the pieces that make up the "road to Shambhala" from different time periods and locations: Ireland, the Yucatán Peninsula of Mexico and China. When Ten ventures into one of the places, he transforms into a different person on a unique quest. In Ireland, Ten is a monk named Felim helping the locals fulfill an old myth. In Yucatán, Ten is the young huntsman Tepec, a cousin of the king, who has to awaken sleeping god Quetzalcōātl to save his city from famine. In China, Ten is civil servant Wei Yulan, who helps defeat a shadow who has taken up residence before the gate of a Daoist monastery, saving the monks from drought. Finally in Shambhala, Ten meets Rhea, the last queen of Atlantis. After visiting the sunken isle, he ensures that the Bearer of Dark is imprisoned.

== Reception ==
=== Sales ===
According to the French newspaper Les Échos, Atlantis II was a commercial hit, with sales of 180,000 units by late December 1999. This number rose to 200,000 units by April 2000. The game went on to become a best-seller in the United States. Atlantis II made up 15% of DreamCatcher Interactive's North American sales in 2000; Cryo Interactive reported more than 100,000 units sold in the region from June through the end of the year. Market research firm PC Data tallied 64,625 sales of the game in North America for 2000, of which 23,327 derived from December. This performance made Atlantis II one of DreamCatcher's top sellers that year—alongside Traitors Gate and The Crystal Key—and resulted in growth at Cryo.

PC Data reported an additional 51,280 units sold in North America during the first half of 2001, while combined global sales of Atlantis II and its predecessor topped 600,000 copies that October. By that time, Atlantis II had sold 160,000 units in France alone. It ended 2001 with 84,237 sales in North America that year, according to PC Data, and it moved another 9,317 copies in the region during the first six months of 2002. The following year, Ghislain Pages of DreamCatcher's European branch remarked that Atlantis II had become "one of the leading products of DreamCatcher in the States", and a sign that European adventures could achieve popularity in the country. Worldwide sales of Atlantis II, Atlantis and their sequel, Atlantis III: The New World, surpassed 1 million total units by 2004.

=== Critical reviews ===
Reception

Review scores
| Publication | Score |
|---|---|
| Adventure Gamers | 4/5 |
| Computer Games Magazine | 1.5/5 |
| Eurogamer | 7/10 |
| GameSpot | 5.6/10 |
| IGN | 6.4/10 |
| MacHome Journal | 3.5/5 |
| PC Gaming World | 7.5/10 |
| Jeuxvideo.com | 14/20 |

In Computer Gaming World, Audrey Wells wrote: "Steer clear if you're not a fan of developer Cryo's work, but if you like immersing yourself in a beautiful world and solving puzzles, Beyond Atlantis is for you".

== See also ==
- Amerzone
- Dracula: Resurrection
- Faust
- The Crystal Key
- Traitors Gate
