= Atlantis: The Lost Tales =

1997 fantasy adventure video game

- Developer: Cryo Interactive
- Publishers: EU: Cryo Interactive; NA: Interplay; NA: DreamCatcher (re-release); EU: Sega (Saturn)
- Director: Rémi Herbulot
- Producers: Rémi Herbulot; Jean-Martial Lefranc; Philippe Ulrich
- Designer: Johan Robson
- Programmer: Éric Safar
- Artist: Thomas Boulard
- Writer: Johan Robson
- Composers: Pierre Estève; Stéphane Picq
- Platforms: Windows, MS-DOS, Saturn, PlayStation
- Release: PC: EU: March 25, 1997; NA: September 30, 1997; Sega Saturn: EU: March 27, 1998; PlayStation: EU: October 1998
- Genre: Adventure
- Mode: Single-player

Atlantis: The Lost Tales (Note: (French: Atlantis: Secrets d'un Monde Oublié) is a 1997 fantasy adventure video game developed and published by Cryo Interactive Entertainment. Interplay Productions published the game in North America, where it released on September 30, 1997. The game is set in the fictional land of Atlantis. Atlantis was a commercial hit, with over 300,000 copies sold worldwide by late 1998, and spawned a series of sequels, including Atlantis II, Atlantis III: The New World, Atlantis Evolution and The Secrets of Atlantis: The Sacred Legacy.

== Gameplay ==
Atlantis: The Lost Tales is a first-person perspective puzzle game. The game is in pre-rendered, panoramic 3D. The HUD is basically a window into the world of Atlantis, instead of moving a mouse around the screen, moving the mouse actually moves the screen itself. To interact with the world, the player must position the item, NPC or thing in the center of the screen.

Progression through the game involves solving puzzles. Some puzzles are extremely abstract and the solution is completely unexpected, whereas other puzzles are very simple. The player must react quickly to certain events happening in the game. For example, in one section guards chase the player away from a certain area. If the player hesitates in moving backwards and looking for shelter, then the player will lose and will have to restart from the beginning of the scene.

== Plot ==
The game begins with Seth, the protagonist, joining the Queen's Companions, the personal guardians of the Queen of Atlantis. He discovers after he arrives that the Queen disappeared shortly before he joined. As the story progresses, Seth learns that a power struggle is taking place between the Queen and her consort, Creon. Creon wishes to supplant Ammu, the goddess of the moon, as the most worshiped of Atlantis' gods, replacing her with Sa'at, the sun god; he then wants to conquer the world in the name of Sa'at, using a new weapon he has developed.

The weapon is revealed to be half of a crystal that is capable of granting immense knowledge to its holder. Long ago, the crystal was split into Light and Dark halves, and the halves were hidden in Easter Island and Stonehenge, respectively. Creon found the Dark Crystal, which has a side effect of driving its holder mad.

Seth retrieves the Light crystal from Easter Island, then returns to Atlantis to face Creon. After Creon's defeat, the weapon he built causes a volcano on Atlantis to erupt. Seth and a few survivors are seen sailing away from Atlantis as it sinks into the sea.

== Development ==
The game features a number of proprietary technologies developed by Cryo. One such technology is called OMNI 3D, which provides a smooth, panoramic 360-degree first-person view of the game environment. This view tends to be less crisp looking than the movement clips that are pre-rendered in the game. All the character animations are motion captured and feature another technology called OMNI SYNC to ensure proper lip synchronization with audio speech. The PlayStation version lacks the movement clips found in the other versions. The Saturn version of the game supports the Saturn mouse, despite the fact that it was only released in Europe, whereas the Saturn mouse was only released in North America and Japan.

The soundtrack for Atlantis: The Lost Tales was composed by Pierre Estève and Stéphane Picq of Shooting Star and was released in 1998 as a two CD set (one of which is an enhanced CD containing wallpapers) on the Shooting Star label.

Atlantis was released for PC in March 1997. Cryo Interactive coded up a new game engine to replicate Atlantis: The Lost Tales on the Sega Saturn, in particular the "freelook" feature. Their demo of this engine convinced Sega of Europe to acquire the license to publish the game for the Saturn.

== Reception ==
=== Sales ===
Atlantis was a commercial hit. The French newspaper Les Échos reported it as one of the top 10 best-selling computer games of 1997. By April 1998, its global sales had reached 250,000 units, of which 50,000 were sold in France. The game totaled 300,000 units sold by that November. According to Bob Mandel of Adrenaline Vault, the game "sold very few copies sold in the United States" despite its "smash hit" status in European countries. The combined global sales of Atlantis and Atlantis II surpassed 600,000 units by October 2001. With the games' sequel, Atlantis III: The New World, the series topped 1 million sales by 2004.

=== Critical reviews ===
Reception

Review scores
| Publication | Score |
|---|---|
| Computer Games Magazine | 2/5 |
| Next Generation | 3/5 |
| PC Gamer (UK) | 72% |

PlayStation Power gave the game a 52% rating, specifically finding that the game was marred by extended loading times. Adventure Lantern gave the game 86 out 100 score largely due to the intriguing story, pleasant atmosphere and the fascinating locations. Gordon Aplin of Quandary found the game annoying to play due to the lack of a useful cursor for navigation or actions and the unforgiving timed reaction sequences.

Next Generation reviewed the PC version of the game, rating it three stars out of five, and stated that "the game's rough spots are few. Most of the puzzles are pitched at the right level of challenge [...] and it takes about the usual 30 or 40 hours to finish. Nicely done, but not much new."
