= Dracula 2: The Last Sanctuary =

2000 video game

- North American PC cover art
- Developer: Wanadoo Edition
- Publishers: Index+; France Telecom Multimedia; Canal+ Multimedia; EU: Cryo Interactive; NA: DreamCatcher Interactive; Microïds (iOS, Mac OS X, Android)
- Designer: Jacques Simian
- Programmers: Philippe Bouet; François Villard
- Writers: Jacques Simian; François Villard
- Composer: Laurent Parisi
- Platforms: Windows, Mac OS, PlayStation, iOS, Mac OS X, Android
- Release: September 25, 2000: Windows; EU: September 25, 2000; NA: February 12, 2001 Mac OS; NA: February 12, 2001 PlayStation; FRA: November 30, 2000; EU: July 13, 2001; NA: June 24, 2002 iOS & Mac OS X; WW: February 25, 2012 Android; WW: October 9, 2013
- Genre: Graphic adventure
- Mode: Single-player

Dracula 2: The Last Sanctuary (originally released as Dracula: The Last Sanctuary) is a 2000 graphic adventure video game developed by Wanadoo Edition and jointly published by Index+, France Telecom Multimedia, Canal+ Multimedia and Cryo Interactive. Originally released for Windows and Mac OS, it was ported to the PlayStation in 2002. A modified version developed and published by Microïds was released for iOS and OS X in 2012 and for Android in 2013. In 2014, the remade version was made available on Steam. There were dubbing mutations in French, English, Spanish, German, Italian, Hungarian and Czech.

The game is a direct sequel to Dracula: Resurrection, which itself is an unofficial sequel to Bram Stoker's Dracula; set seven years after the end of the novel, Jonathan Harker finds that he must once again do battle with the evil Count Dracula in an effort to save his wife, Mina. A third game, with an unrelated storyline, followed in 2008, Dracula 3: The Path of the Dragon. A loose sequel to Path of the Dragon was released in a two-part form in 2013; Dracula 4: The Shadow of the Dragon and Dracula 5: The Blood Legacy.

Dracula: The Last Sanctuary was most widely reviewed for the PC, where it received mixed reviews, with critics praising the graphics, but criticising the nature of some of the puzzles. By 2007, the game and its predecessor had reached combined global sales above 1 million units.

== Gameplay ==
Dracula: The Last Sanctuary is a first-person point-and-click adventure game, which employs an "empty" HUD; the player's inventory is accessible through a button press, whilst another button press will bring the player to a screen with options to save their game, quit their game, or load a previously saved game. As such, the entire screen depicts only direct gameplay.

The game uses a basic point-and-click interface to move the player around and manipulate the game world. Within each static screen, the player is free to look around 360 degrees. As the player moves the cursor around the screen it can change into different styles depending on the situation; neutral cursor (no interaction is possible), an arrow (the player can move in the direction indicated), an arrow within a red circle (access temporarily blocked) a hand (the player can take the object), a magnifying glass (an area which can be examined in more detail), a backwards arrow (the player can move backwards from an area with which they have examined via the magnifying glass), a cog (the player must use an inventory item to initiate interaction with the object), a cog with a hand (the player can operate the object without using an inventory item), an object within a red circle (use of the item temporarily prohibited).

The most often encountered symbol in the game is the cog. When the player encounters this symbol, they must enter their inventory and select an item. If it is the correct item to operate the object, the item will appear in a green circle, replacing the cog icon. If it is the incorrect item, the cog icon will remain.

Harker faces one of Dracula's creatures in combat mode. Note the time meter along the top of the screen. If the player fails to act fast enough, the creature will stare the player down, prompting a "Game Over" screen.

The game introduces two new elements not found in Dracula: Resurrection; rudimentary combat and combining inventory items. Combat mode replaces the cursor with a reticle, and occurs infrequently, involving either a revolver or a crossbow. It is usually (but not always) timed, and often requires the player to perform a particular action, such as hitting the enemy in a specific spot to achieve victory. If they fail to do so within the designated time, the player will die. In relation to combining inventory items, unlike in the first game, the inventory screen is divided into two - a full circle, and a small semi-circle on the outer edge of the screen. Items placed within the semi-circle cannot be used directly in the game itself, but must be combined by the player with items placed within the full circle. For example, the player's gun is in the full circle, but their bullets are placed within the semi circle.

The 2012 iOS version adds several new features to the game, such as an optional help feature (which highlights interactive zones on each screen), a "quick inventory" (which allows the player to hold one item and access it without having to enter the inventory screen), an autosave feature, and a "Compass Look" feature (which utilises the gyroscopic-based iDevice accelerometer controls to mimic looking around in the 360 degree environment).

== Plot ==
The game opens with the final scene from Dracula: Resurrection; Jonathan Harker (voiced by David Gasman) rescuing his wife Mina (Gay Marshall) from Dracula's castle and vowing to defeat the Count upon returning to London. Harker has come to realise Dracula called Mina to Transylvania precisely so Harker would follow her. Upon arriving in the Borgo Pass, Dracula knew Harker would uncover the Dragon Ring, which Dracula himself could not do as it had been placed under the protection of Saint George. Harker then brought the ring to the castle just as Dracula had planned. Once Harker arrived in the castle, Dracula had instructed his brides to kill him and take the ring, but Harker had been able to rescue Mina and escape, with the ring still in his possession.

As the game begins, Harker has left the Dragon Ring with Dr. Seward (Paul Barrett), and has gone to Dracula's former London home, Carfax Abbey, to search for clues. Inside, he is attacked by several bat-like humanoids. He manages to destroy them, and heads to Seward's insane asylum. Seward tells Harker that Dracula has purchased a cinema in London called The Styx. He also informs him that his research has led him to conclude part of the Dragon Ring is missing - a diamond at its centre which is said to counteract the evil of the outer ring. In an effort to determine how to proceed against Dracula, Seward puts Mina under hypnosis and she describes the nearby Highgate Cemetery. Harker heads to the cemetery, where he see Dracula entering a secret tomb. He attempts to follow, but a light is emitted from some nearby stone gargoyles, and he is knocked out.

He wakes up the next day and heads back to the asylum to find Mina and Seward have been taken by Dracula. In Seward's safe, he finds the Dragon Ring and correspondence between Seward and a colleague, who had found a 15th-century book which details the rivalry between Vlad Tepes and his younger brother Radu. When their father, Dracul, died, he left the Dragon Ring to Radu on the advice of his magician, Dorko. Tepes was furious and locked Radu in his castle, banished Dorko to the dungeons, and split the ring in two, hiding the diamond and keeping the outer ring for himself. Tepes then had a heretical monk, Thadeus, build a "Last Sanctuary" deep within the castle, to which he could retreat in times of crisis. For safe keeping, Harker gives the Dragon Ring to Hopkins (Steve Gadler), a patient in the asylum who was under the influence of Dracula, but who has fallen in love with Mina, and is willing to help Harker save her.

Harker heads to The Styx, but is gassed. He awakens in Dracula's bedroom in Transylvania. Dracula (Allan Wenger) tells him he will spare his life if Harker reveals where the Dragon Ring is, but Harker refuses. Dracula leaves, promising Harker a slow death. Shortly thereafter, Hopkins arrives and releases Harker. When he leaves the room, he realises he is still in The Styx; the room was a set made to look like Dracula's room. As he explores, he encounters Seward, who is turning into a vampire. Seward tells Harker he must destroy Carfax, whilst he himself will destroy The Styx, leaving Dracula nowhere to hide in London. Harker leaves, and Seward blows up The Styx, killing himself before he turns into a vampire.

Harker sets fire to Carfax and heads to Highgate, where he finds a note from Hopkins telling him how to access Dracula's tomb. With the note is the Dragon Ring. Harker enters the tomb and encounters Dracula, who tells him he is returning to Transylvania with Mina. Harker gives chase, using the mines to enter the castle. Underneath the castle, he finds an ancient prison in which he finds Radu's diamond. In the dungeons, he once again encounters Dorko (Gay Marshall), who tells him her previous betrayal of him failed to earn her Dracula's trust. He shows her the diamond, and she tells him she can reassemble the Dragon Ring, but before she does so she is stabbed by one of Dracula's brides. As she dies, she tells Harker he must restore the ring and defeat Dracula. Harker works his way through the traps in the castle, eventually taking a cable car to Dracula's keep.

Upon arriving, a gypsy attacks Harker, but Hopkins appears and sacrifices himself to save him. As he dies, Hopkins gives Harker the key to the Last Sanctuary. Harker explores further, killing Dracula's remaining gypsies, and eventually entering the sanctuary itself, but he is taken prisoner by Dracula's brides. They bring him to Dracula, who tells him Mina is now his forever. Harker appeals to Mina, reminding her they are married in the eyes of God, but she says she cannot remember. He shows her their wedding ring, and she regains her memories. A furious Dracula says both she and Harker must die, but Harker combines Radu's diamond with the Dragon Ring, and Dracula is engulfed in light as the castle begins to crumble. Dracula's brides are crushed by falling debris, and Dracula himself is killed when he is impaled by a statue of Saint George. As the castle ceases collapsing, Harker embraces Mina.

== Development ==
Dracula 2: The Last Sanctuary was released in September 2000. It was created by Canal+ Multimedia and Wanadoo Edition, the latter company formed earlier in September by the merger of Index+ and France Telecom Multimedia.

== Reception ==
Reception

Aggregate score
Aggregator	Score
Metacritic	68/100

Review scores
Publication	Score
Adventure Gamers	3/5
GameSpot	5.5/10
IGN	7.8/10
PC Gamer (US)	50%
Adventure Classic Gaming	4/5
Computer Games Magazine	3/5
The Electric Playground	8/10

The PC version of the game received "mixed or average reviews," and holds an aggregate score of 68 out of 100 on Metacritic, based on fourteen reviews. In North America, its computer version sold 67,776 retail units during 2001, and 21,204 in the first six months of 2002. According to Microïds, the combined global sales of Dracula 2 and its predecessor, Dracula: Resurrection, surpassed 1 million copies by June 2007.

Adventure Classic Gaming's Zack Howe scored the game 4 out of 5, praising the graphics; "As with its predecessor, pre-rendered graphics are solely used for cutscenes and are truly a sight to behold. [...] All of the 3D characters are amazingly detailed. Their faces are expressive and their eyes subtly capture the different personalities." Although he was critical of the "pixel-hunting" nature of some of the puzzles, he concluded "Dracula: The Last Sanctuary is definitely a much better game than Dracula: Resurrection. I recommend this game to any adventure fan without reservation. The excellent production values and thoughtful gameplay makes this game a worthy sequel for the series."

IGN's Steve Butts scored it 7.8 out of 10. He too praised the graphics, saying "Just using flat backgrounds, the game renders the illusion of a full 3D environment better than any game I've seen yet. Even better, the game looked (and ran) just as well on a simple 333MHz with a Voodoo2 as it did on a 600MHz with a Voodoo 5." He too was somewhat critical of some of the puzzles, but concluded "Although some of the situations are kind of a stretch, the story is well done and interesting in its own right. Hell, even the parts that threaten your suspension of disbelief are kind of cool."

Adventure Gamers' Christina Gmiterko scored it 3 out of 5, praising the graphics and calling them "its strongest selling point." However, she was critical of the core gameplay; "I spent a lot of the game waving my cursor across the screen to find a hot spot where an inventory item needed to be used. Once I found it I would just try combining every inventory item I had with the obstacle at hand until I found the one that worked because more often than not it wasn't reasonably obvious what item you should be using or why you should be using it. By the time I reached the end I felt like I had seen the inventory screen almost as much as I had the actual game."

GameSpot's Ron Dulin scored it 5.5 out of 10. He criticised the game for having "huge lapses in logic, no atmosphere, and very little in the way of respect for Bram Stoker's original story." He was critical of the lack of horror in the game; "Dracula: The Last Sanctuary doesn't even manage to maintain a slightly creepy atmosphere. The opening would lead you to believe otherwise, because of its creepy music that sets the stage for a terrifying adventure. Unfortunately, this music is all but absent from the game afterward. The voice acting doesn't help: The confused-sounding actors ham it up like they're auditioning for a part in Mark Borchardt's Coven." He concluded "The puzzles will be enough for those who are content with being limited to the challenge of finding a way past locked doors and blocked passageways. But great games transcend their genre's limitations, while good games work within them. Mediocre games, like Dracula: The Last Sanctuary, only serve to remind us of why such things are limitations in the first place."

== Legacy ==
When asked in late 2000 about the likelihood of a third Dracula game, the team's François Villard noted that writers face "the temptation of the trilogy", but that Dracula 3 nevertheless was not planned. However, he left open the possibility of another entry if player interest was high enough.

== See also ==
- Atlantis III: The New World
- Faust
- Riddle of the Sphinx: An Egyptian Adventure
- Schizm: Mysterious Journey

Preceded by Dracula: Resurrection	Dracula game series	Succeeded by Dracula 3: The Path of the Dragon
