= Dracula: Resurrection =

1999 video game

- French box art
- Developer: Index+
- Publishers: FRA: Index+; UK: Microïds; NA: DreamCatcher Interactive (Note: Mobile versions published by Buka Mobile.)
- Designer: Jacques Simian
- Writers: Jacques Simian; François Villard
- Platforms: Microsoft Windows, Mac OS, PlayStation, iOS, Android
- Release: Microsoft Windows, Mac OS: EU: October 1999; NA: June 5, 2000; PlayStation: EU: September 14, 2000; NA: June 14, 2001; iOS: WW: September 1, 2011; Android: WW: September 18, 2013
- Genre: Graphic adventure
- Mode: Single-player

Dracula: Resurrection is a 1999 graphic adventure video game developed by Index+. Set in 1904 Transylvania, the game serves as a follow-up to Bram Stoker's novel Dracula. Seven years after the death of Count Dracula, Jonathan Harker's wife Mina finds herself mysteriously drawn back to Transylvania. Jonathan subsequently travels to Borgo Pass in an effort to rescue her. The player assumes the role of Jonathan and uses a point-and-click interface to solve puzzles and navigate the game's world, often with the help of an object called the Dragon Ring.

Production of Dracula was led by Jacques Simian of Index+. It was the company's first traditional video game: the team had previously created software with an educational and cultural tourism emphasis, a style that informed Dracula's design. Building from myths, legends, Bram Stoker's novel and films about vampires, Dracula's creators sought to create a follow-up to Stoker's story that was imbued with the same atmosphere of dread as its predecessor. The game underwent a rapid development cycle of 8 months, and was first launched in Europe in October 1999. In North America, it was published by DreamCatcher Interactive the following year. There were dubs in French, English, Spanish, German, Italian, Hungarian and Czech.

Dracula received "mixed or average" reviews from critics, according to Metacritic. Reviewers praised the game's graphics and some of the puzzles, but criticized the voice acting, plot and the game's brevity. Selling 200,000 units worldwide by September 2000, the game was a commercial success. In North America, it became a top title for DreamCatcher and sold 170,000 units by 2003. Dracula and its direct sequel, Dracula 2: The Last Sanctuary (2000), reached combined global sales above 1 million units by April 2007. After Dracula 2's release, the Dracula series went on hiatus until the 2007 announcement of Dracula 3: The Path of the Dragon by Kheops Studio and MC2 France. Fourth and fifth entries in the series, developed by Koalabs and published by Anuman, appeared in 2013.

== Gameplay ==
The player stands in Borgo Pass. The cursor is a magnifying glass, indicating that the player can zoom in.

Dracula: Resurrection is a graphic adventure game that takes place from a character's eye-view in a pre-rendered graphical environment. The player uses a point-and-click interface, with a cursor locked in the screen's center, to navigate the game world, gather items, interact with non-player characters and solve puzzles. In a manner that has been compared to Myst, Dracula restricts player movement to jumps between static screens in the game world. Each screen is panoramic and allows the player to look around in 360 degrees. Progression in Dracula is linear: the player cannot backtrack to the game's primary areas once they have been completed.

Dracula's puzzles often involve locating and using items to progress, and many revolve around an object called the Dragon Ring that is reused throughout the game. Collected items may be examined and selected on the inventory screen, which the player toggles with a button press. As the player mouses over the game environments, the cursor changes shape in a context-sensitive manner to illustrate the possible actions. For example, the hand cursor indicates that an item can be picked up, while the cog cursor indicates that the player can use an item on a location.

The iOS re-release of Dracula includes a "Compass Look" feature, which uses the gyroscope inside the player's iPad or iPhone to control the first-person view. This version of the game also contains an optional "Help" function for beginners, which keeps every on-screen interaction point highlighted at all times.

== Plot ==
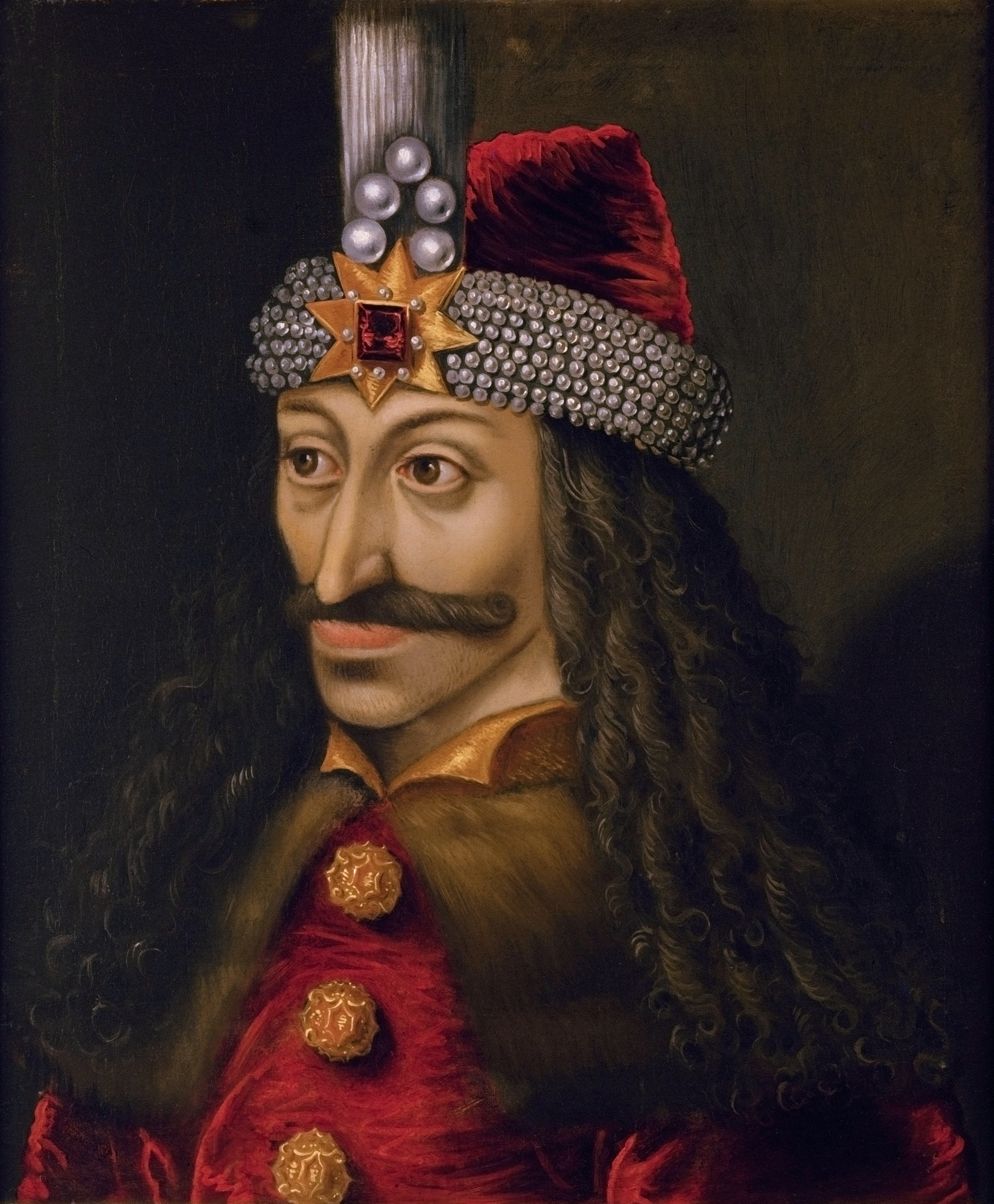
The history of Vlad the Impaler (pictured) and his father Vlad II Dracul are referenced throughout Dracula: Resurrection.

Dracula: Resurrection begins by recounting the final scene of Bram Stoker's original novel. In the year 1897, protagonists Jonathan Harker and Quincey Morris ambush the caravan of Count Dracula and his minions in Borgo Pass. Although Morris dies in the struggle, the pair succeeds in killing Dracula and releasing Jonathan's wife Mina from her psychic enslavement to the vampire. Afterward, an ellipsis takes the story forward seven years. The Harkers' new life in England is disrupted by Mina's sudden disappearance, and Jonathan finds a letter from his wife that suggests Dracula's involvement. He subsequently tracks her to Transylvania. Stopping for directions at the Borgo Pass Inn, he has a brief encounter with two suspicious characters, followers of Dracula. Jonathan questions the innkeeper Barina about Dracula's castle, but she warns him against traveling there in the dark, especially as it is Saint George's Eve, a night on which evil spirits move freely.

Jonathan gets directions to the castle from Micha, a bar patron, who suggests using the bridge near the inn. He claims that the building is abandoned, and that Dracula has not been seen since his death. However, Dracula's henchmen Goran and Iorga roam the countryside around the inn, and Iorga stands guard at the bridge to prevent Jonathan's passage. Jonathan travels to a nearby cemetery, where he sees a mysterious blue light near a representation of Saint George. Using a pickaxe, he digs up a section of the ground there and discovers the Dragon Ring beneath. When Jonathan brings the ring back to Micha, he warns him that it relates to the evil Dracul, somehow connected to Dracula, and that dragons are associated with Hell in Transylvania. Micha also informs Jonathan that the followers of Dracula, Viorel and his henchmen, have recently become active again after a long disappearance, and questions whom they could be working for.

Jonathan manages to trick and knock out Iorga and Goran, opening the path to the bridge and the henchmen's cabin. Viorel is angered and begins to search for the perpetrator; in terror, Barina bars the doors to the inn. The bridge collapses when Jonathan attempts to cross it, which forces him to find another way. After he sneaks back into the inn, Barina tells him that her husband had died after finding a tunnel in the basement, and gives Jonathan access to his journal. The book explains that the Dragon Ring is a key to Dracula's lair, to which the tunnel leads, and that Barina's husband had hidden the ring in the cemetery to keep the door closed. Jonathan uses the Dragon Ring to enter, and is ultimately led to an abandoned mine shaft below the henchmen's cabin. Above, Viorel cuts the rope to Jonathan's elevator. Now trapped underground, Jonathan explores and uses the Dragon Ring to forge a path to Dracula's castle. As he travels, it is revealed that Dracula is watching, and that his plan was always for Jonathan to bring the Dragon Ring into his domain.

Upon arriving inside the castle grounds, Jonathan progresses with the help of the Dragon Ring. He soon opens the cell of an old woman named Dorko, a witch imprisoned by Dracula and kept outside the main castle by a curse. She was once a follower of Dracul, Dracula's father, until Dracula banished her after his father's death. She offers to help Jonathan find Mina in exchange for her own freedom. Theorizing that his wife is held in Dracula's crypt under the watch of Dracula's brides, Dorko explains that two objects are necessary to locate Mina: an amulet and the medal of the Dragon Brotherhood. Dorko opens a passage into the castle for Jonathan, and he begins to explore Dracula's realm, including his library and personal quarters. In the library, Jonathan discovers a letter addressed to him, in which Dracula tells him that he has walked into a trap, that Dracula himself has left for London and that his brides will kill Jonathan when nightfall arrives.

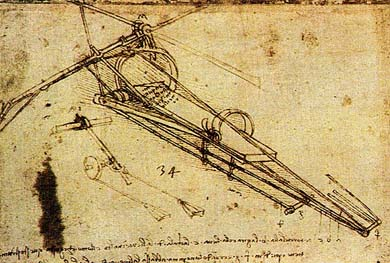
Leonardo da Vinci's ornithopter plays a pivotal role in the story.

Continuing to explore with the help of the Dragon Ring and Dorko's advice, Jonathan finds the medal and opens the way to Dracula's secret chamber. There, a journal entry reveals that Dracula had met Leonardo da Vinci in 1468 and taken the blueprint for his ornithopter, which Dracula has successfully constructed and placed in the castle tower. Jonathan proceeds to the crypt and takes the amulet, but is cornered by Dracula's brides, who claim that Dorko is using him. However, they are unable to attack him directly while he holds the Dragon Ring, and plan instead to wait until he falls unconscious from exhaustion. Jonathan opens a window to drive the brides away with sunlight and proceeds to the attic. Dorko then confronts him and demands the amulet, the curse having been lifted when Jonathan took the object.

When Jonathan gives her the amulet in exchange for Mina, Dorko betrays him, explaining that she wants to rule with Dracula as she had with Dracul. She plans to use Jonathan, Mina and the Dragon Ring to prove her loyalty and secure her position with Dracula. Dorko locks them in the attic, but Jonathan uses the Dragon Ring to open a path for the ornithopter to launch. Dracula's brides arrive and attempt to stop Jonathan's escape in the machine. However, he eludes them and flies out with the unconscious Mina. As the game ends, he remarks that Mina can never be safe while Dracula lives, and that he must defeat the Count once and for all upon their return to London.

== Development ==
Dracula: Resurrection was a co-production between Index+ and the companies France Telecom Multimedia and Canal+ Multimedia. The project was headed by Index's long-time designer, art director and writer Jacques Simian, who had previously art directed the developer's Opération Teddy Bear. Dracula represented a departure in style for Index. The company had achieved success by developing software with an educational and cultural tourism emphasis; conversely, Dracula was designed as its first traditional computer game. Génération 4's Luc-Santiago Rodriguez called this "the logical continuation" of Index+'s process, but noted that the team sought continuity with its previous work, which had centered on immediate hooks, unique concepts and a blend of "play and culture" that favored ease-of-use.

Although they built from Bram Stoker's novel Dracula, the game's creators billed their project as "an interactive sequel" to the book, rather than a literal adaptation. Nevertheless, they sought to imbue it with an atmosphere of dread like that of its source material. Génération 4 reported that Simian was "[p]assionate about Stoker's novel and the story of Vlad Tepes"; the designer claimed to have read the original Dracula several dozen times. To create the game's plot, the team wrote that it worked from "popular legend, superstition and myth". The creators noted that the etymology of Dracula's name in Romanian was unclear—possibly implying a relation to both Satan and dragons—and that they drew from the story of Saint George and the Dragon as the source for the central Dragon Ring item. William of Newburgh's Historia rerum Anglicarum was referenced as well. Dracula's brides were inspired by the Greco-Roman Strix monster, which the team connected to mythological creatures such as Lamia, Empusa, Onoskelis, the Gello and the One Thousand and One Nights' portrayal of ghouls.

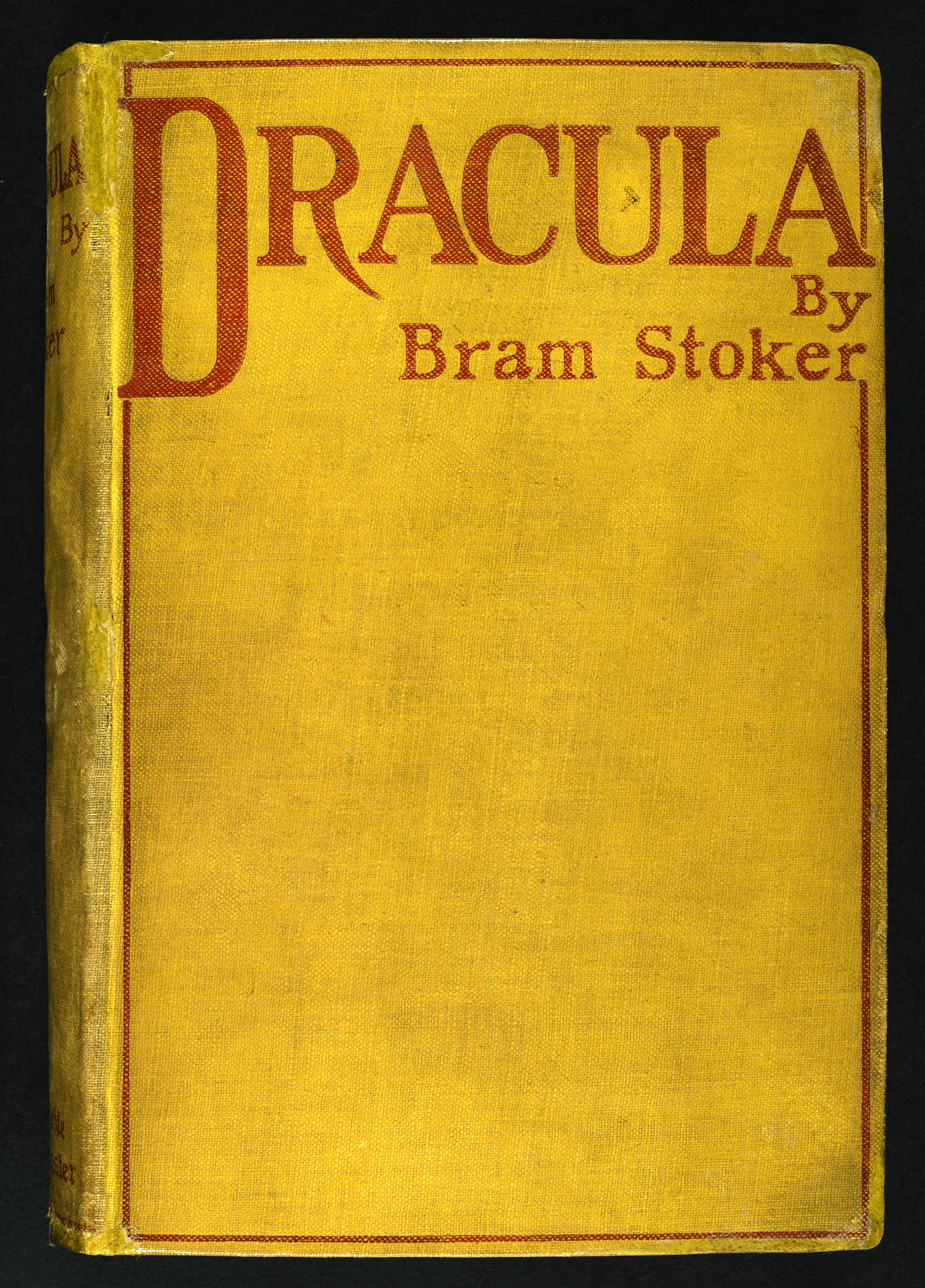
Dracula: Resurrection was billed as "an interactive sequel" to the 1897 novel by author Bram Stoker.

According to the team, the environments in Dracula were built from "sketches, photographs, architectural plans, works on Transylvania" and other such sources. Films about vampires also influenced this work. Simian cited the aesthetic of Bram Stoker's Dracula as a personal favorite, and Génération 4's Noël Chanat wrote that the game took cues from this movie. The 1931 film Dracula, starring Bela Lugosi, was referenced for a section of Dracula's castle, while the Borgo Pass inn borrowed from Roman Polanski's The Fearless Vampire Killers. In retrospect, co-writer François Villard noted that the unpredictability of player interaction required the creation of "limited universes as to the player's ability to move", and a storytelling model focused heavily on place. To build Dracula's 360° panoramic environments, the team worked with Phoenix VR, a middleware engine provided by 4X Technologies. The software was also used in games such as Amerzone. For Dracula's cutscenes, the team licensed 4X Technologies' "4X Movie" codec.

In designing the game's cast, Index's Stéphane Hamache remarked that the "objective was to produce 12 atypical characters ... in a very short time". The team placed a special focus on character graphics during the 3D modeling stage, and facial motion capture was employed to create more realistic expressions. The writing staff crafted a psychological profile for each character before dialogue work began. Villard explained that the innkeeper's fearful and superstitious nature, for example, led the team to include references to the suspicious, occult happenings of Borgo Pass in all of her lines. Discussing the writing process, Villard noted that "information takes precedence" in dialogue but that "style is very important because it contributes to the overall atmosphere". In 2007, after leaving the game industry, he recalled that the expenses associated with voice acting, lip sync and graphics production limited the scope of his writing for games like Dracula.

Dracula underwent a rapid development cycle of around 8 months, according to Sébastien Rossignol of Index. He described production as "an enormous challenge". Forecast in mid-1999 for a September release, the game ultimately launched in Europe in October 1999, and a port for the PlayStation followed in early 2000. Dracula's North American distribution rights were acquired by DreamCatcher Interactive on March 20, 2000. Within the week, the publisher scheduled the game for an early-May release. DreamCatcher founder Richard Wah Kan forecast a minimum of 50,000 lifetime sales for Dracula in North America, but noted that "[a]nywhere from 50,000 to 150,000 would be great." He based these figures on the perceived high quality of Dracula compared to similar games of the era. The publisher shipped Dracula in North America in early June 2000. A plan to release the PlayStation version in North America was underway by the time of the 2000 Electronic Entertainment Expo. DreamCatcher became a certified PlayStation publisher in January 2001, with Dracula set to be its first title on the platform. The PlayStation version's North American launch remained pending by June 2001, but had occurred by that August.

== Reception ==
=== Sales ===
Dracula: Resurrection was commercially successful. According to Index+, combined global sales of its computer and PlayStation releases had reached 200,000 units by mid-September 2000. In North America, the game was one of DreamCatcher Interactive's top titles for 2000 and made up 9% of the publisher's sales that year. PC Data reported 27,798 retail sales of Dracula's computer version in the region by the end of 2000, of which 6,012 were sold in December. GameSpy's Mark Asher wrote in March 2001 that the game was "selling well in the U.S. (doing about 100,000 copies) and doing better in Europe." PC Data recorded another 21,050 retail sales for the game's computer version during 2001, and 3,709 in the first six months of 2002. According to DreamCatcher, Dracula totaled 170,000 copies sold in North America alone by early 2003. The computer version's jewel case re-release achieved 20,910 sales in the region during 2003, by PC Data's estimates.

In April 2007, Microïds announced that the combined global sales of Dracula and its sequel, Dracula 2, had surpassed 1 million copies. Sales of the overall Dracula series rose above 1.5 million units worldwide by November 2013.

=== Critical reviews ===
Reception

Review scores
Publication	Score
Adventure Gamers	3/5
Computer Games Magazine	3/5
GameSpot	6.0/10
IGN	8.0/10
PC Gamer (US)	79%
PC PowerPlay	58/100
PC Zone	39%
Just Adventure	B+
The Electric Playground	8/10

Award
Publication	Award
The Electric Playground	Best Adventure Game for PC 2000 (nominee)

According to the review aggregation website Metacritic, Dracula: Resurrection's computer version received "mixed or average reviews" from critics. The game was one of three adventure titles recommended in IGN's 2000 Holiday Buying Guide; the editors called it "a bright spot in this past year's adventure games" and wrote that its soundtrack "is creepy enough to fill two horror games." Dracula was also nominated for The Electric Playground's 2000 "Best Adventure Game for PC" award, but this prize ultimately went to The Longest Journey.

IGN's Scott Steinberg scored the game 8 out of 10, praising the simple interface, the logic of the puzzles, the difficulty level and the graphics. He concluded "We've been waiting for a respectable point and click adventure since Grim Fandango came along, and although Dracula: Resurrection is a quick ride, it's well worth the price of admission." Marc Saltzman of PC Gamer US likewise wrote that it "proves there's plenty of blood left in this genre."

GameSpot's Ron Dulin scored the game 6 out of 10. He too criticised the fact that Dracula's resurrection is never explained, and was also critical of the core gameplay; "simply clicking every object in your inventory on every object in view will get you through the majority of the puzzles. There's no way to die in the game, so there's no real punishment for simply trying everything and anything." He was impressed with the graphics, calling the NPCs "some of the best-looking rendered human characters ever to appear in a PC game." However, he was critical of the voice acting. He concluded "Dracula: Resurrection is somewhat interesting only because it's quick, easy, and atmospheric. It's very short, so even novice adventure gamers won't have much trouble finishing it in a few sessions."

== Legacy ==
Dracula: Resurrection was the first entry in what Adventure Gamers' Pascal Tekaia later called a "long-running point-and-click horror series". It was followed in September 2000 by a direct sequel, Dracula 2: The Last Sanctuary, released by Canal+ Multimedia and Wanadoo Edition. The latter company had been formed earlier in September by the merger of Index+ and France Telecom Multimedia. Dracula 2 continues the story of the first game, depicting Jonathan Harker's efforts to hunt Count Dracula in both London and Transylvania. When asked in late 2000 about the likelihood of a third Dracula game, the team's François Villard noted that writers face "the temptation of the trilogy", but that Dracula 3 nevertheless was not planned. However, he left open the possibility of another entry if player interest was high enough. Villard ultimately exited the game industry after Dracula 2.

Following the second title's release, the Dracula series entered a years-long period of inactivity. A third installment was eventually announced by MC2 France in April 2007, under the name Dracula 3. MC2, which had absorbed Wanadoo Edition in 2003, contracted Kheops Studio to develop the new project. Dracula 3 was not intended as a sequel to the first two games, but as a "comprehensive change of perspective in the approach of the Dracula myth", according to Kheops' Benoît Hozjan. While it contains allusions to the earlier titles, it instead tells the story of Arno Moriani, a priest investigating a cause for sainthood in 1920s Transylvania. The project was initially scheduled for release during the 2007 holiday shopping season, but it underwent a delay to early 2008. After being retitled Dracula 3: The Path of the Dragon that February, the game launched in France on April 10, 2008.

In late 2009, Iceberg Interactive and MC2's Microïds label reissued Dracula: Resurrection and its two sequels as the Dracula Trilogy. A revised, episodic version of Resurrection was launched for iOS by Anuman and Microïds in September 2011. This move was part of a wider strategy by Anuman, which had bought the Microïds label in January 2010, to reach iPhone and iPad customers with iOS reissues of Microïds' back catalog. In July 2013, Dracula was again re-released as part of the Dracula Trilogy bundle on the digital distribution platform GOG.com. A standalone version for Steam followed in 2014.

Anuman announced a fourth entry in the Dracula franchise at the November 2012 Game Connection Europe conference, ending a hiatus of original releases in the series. Entitled Dracula 4: The Shadow of the Dragon and developed by Koalabs in France, the game follows the story of an art restoration expert named Ellen Cross, who travels the world while investigating an anonymous artwork. Dracula 4's plot is unrelated that of any previous game in the series, and ends in a cliffhanger that Adventure Gamers' Jack Allin wrote was widely criticized. The game was released in June 2013. That August, Anuman and Koalabs announced a direct sequel under the title of Dracula 5: The Blood Legacy. The game concludes the narrative of Ellen Cross, who is now under the effects of a terminal hematologic disease. Dracula 5 launched in December 2013.

== See also ==
- Atlantis II
- Faust: The Seven Games of the Soul
- The Crystal Key
- Traitors Gate

== Notes ==
Preceded by None	Dracula game series	Succeeded by Dracula 2: The Last Sanctuary
