= Lost Tales =

Lost Tales may refer to:

- The Book of Lost Tales, a collection of stories by J.R.R. Tolkien
- Atlantis: The Lost Tales, a computer game developed by Cryo Interactive
- Babylon 5: The Lost Tales, a direct-to-DVD anthology show set in the Babylon 5 universe
- "Lost Tales" (EP), an EP by black metal band Summoning
