= Dracula 3: The Path of the Dragon =

2008 video game

- European PC cover art
- Developer: Kheops Studio
- Publishers: EU: MC2 France (PC); NA: Encore (PC); WW: Chillingo (iOS); WW: Coladia (OS X)
- Director: Benoît Hozjan
- Producer: Catherine Peyrot
- Designer: Alexis Lang
- Programmer: Frédéric Jaume
- Artist: Franck Letiec
- Writer: Benoît Hozjan
- Composer: Yan Volsy
- Platforms: Windows, iOS, OS X
- Release: April 10, 2008: Windows; FRA: April 10, 2008; NA: August 12, 2008; UK: September 22, 2011 iOS (Part 1); WW: January 21, 2010 iOS (Part 2); WW: March 6, 2010 iOS (Part 3); WW: May 17, 2010 OS X; WW: October 28, 2010 iOS (Full); WW: October 20, 2013
- Genre: Point-and-click adventure
- Mode: Single-player

Dracula 3: The Path of the Dragon is a 2008 point-and-click adventure video game developed by Kheops Studio for Microsoft Windows, and published by MC2 France under their Microïds label in Europe and Encore in North America. In 2010, an abridged version of the game developed by Tetraedge Games and published by Chillingo was released in a three-part episodic form for iOS (as Dracula: The Path of the Dragon). The full version of the game was ported to OS X in 2010, published by Coladia. Also in 2010, the three-part iOS version was made available for PC as the Dracula Series. In 2014, the abridged iOS version was made available as a single game on Steam.

The game follows 1999's Dracula: Resurrection and Dracula: The Last Sanctuary, although the storyline is unrelated to either game. Path of the Dragon takes place in 1920, and follows Father Arno Moriani of the Sacred Congregation of Rites, who is sent to the village of Vladoviste in the diocese of Alba Iula in Transylvania to investigate the possible canonization of a recently deceased doctor, Martha Calugarul. However, Moriani soon learns Calugarul believed herself to have been engaged in a battle with a vampire, possibly Dracula himself, and although initially skeptical of the story, he slowly comes to believe there may be some validity to it. A loose sequel to Path of the Dragon was released in a two-part form in 2013; Dracula 4: The Shadow of the Dragon and Dracula 5: The Blood Legacy.

Path of the Dragon was most widely reviewed for the PC, where it received mixed reviews. Most critics praised the graphics, music, sound effects and voice acting, but the gameplay and puzzles received a more mixed response, with some finding the puzzles too esoteric and/or illogical, and others feeling they fit the nature of the game well.

== Gameplay ==
Path of the Dragon is a first-person point-and-click adventure game, which employs an "empty" HUD; the player's inventory is accessible through a button press, which also allows access to a list of objectives, details of all conversations, records of all documents seen and collected, and options for the player to save their game, quit their game, or load a previously saved game. As such, the entire screen depicts only direct gameplay.

The player character, Father Arno Moriani, speaks to Professor Heinrich von Krüger. Telephone conversations are an important part of the gameplay throughout Path of the Dragon.

The game uses a basic point-and-click interface to move the player around and manipulate the game world. Within each screen, the player is free to look around 360 degrees. As the player moves the cursor around the screen it can change into different styles depending on the situation; neutral cursor (no interaction is possible), an arrow (the player can move in the direction indicated), a mouth (the player can speak to the character over whom the option appears), an eye (an area or object can be examined in more detail), a magnifying glass (an object contains important information which needs closer examination), a hand (the player can take the object), a cog (the player must use an inventory item to initiate interaction with the object), a cog with red line (the player is attempting to use the wrong inventory item to initiate interaction), a left-right horizontal arrow (the object can be moved left and right), an up-down vertical arrow (the object can be moved up and down), a circular arrow (the object can be rotated).

When the player clicks on a person to whom they wish to speak, a list of conversation topics appear on screen. When the player picks up an item, it is automatically put into an auto-holder rather than the main inventory, and must be transferred manually from the auto-holder to the inventory screen. This allows the player to sort the inventory in any way they wish. A major part of the gameplay is examining documents, which have a separate section in the inventory screen, presenting the player with numerous options. For example, the player can organise the documents in two ways; by title or by the order in which they were found. Players can also "flag" documents so as to relate them to particular clues, and can then examine all documents related to any one particular clue together, without having to navigate through non-related documents. The documents screen also includes a "compare" view for examining different copies of the same pictures to find differences between them, and all documents can be examined in more detail with a magnifying glass. The game also includes complete copies of the Bible and Bram Stoker's Dracula, and each text has a "random page" option, which opens the book at a random passage. If done at certain times in the game, the random option can present clues to the player as to how to proceed (when this is the case, the "random page" option flashes).

The 2010 three-part abridged iOS version, which was also released for Windows as the Dracula Series, adds several new features to the game, such as an optional help feature (which highlights interactive zones on each screen), and a "quick inventory" (which allows the player to hold one item and access it without having to enter the inventory screen). This version of the game also removes several of the more difficult puzzles and is shorter than the main version of the game, with several cutscenes and plot points absent.

== Plot ==
The game begins in 1920, with Cardinal Felicio Briganti sending Father Arno Moriani of the Sacred Congregation of Rites to the village of Vladoviste in the diocese of Alba Iula in Transylvania to investigate a candidate for sainthood; Martha Calugarul, a physician and scientist who died several months previously. The process is being fast-tracked because Transylvania has recently been annexed by Romania, leaving Catholics in the minority, and the church feels a local saint may help the Catholics reaffirm their identity in relation to the majority Orthodox in the diocese.

Upon arriving at his inn, Moriani meets Ozana, the innkeeper, and Janos Pekmester, a professor in Medieval History, who is in Vladoviste to excavate the nearby ruins of the Castle of Twilight, Vlad Tepes' residence during his time as Voivode. Moriani learns of Calugarul's biography; after becoming a scientist she was badly burned, forcing her to wear a veil over the side of her face. Later, she worked with Professor Heinrich von Krüger investigating a blood disorder called the "P syndrome". During World War I, she remained in Vladoviste and cared for combatants on both sides. She died in bed, apparently from exhaustion, soon after the war.

The next day, Moriani meets a reporter, Stephan Luca, who tells him Calugarul was murdered. He shows Moriani files in which Calugarul reports people dying of unexplainable blood loss, prior to which they were prone to sleepwalking and reacting violently to garlic. All of these patients had two small hematomas on their neck when they died, and all had the "P anomaly" in their blood. Luca claims Calugarul believed a vampire was at work in Vladoviste, and vowed to walk "The Path of the Dragon" to find and confront it. However, because Calugarul believed in vampires and engaged in occult practices to combat them, she cannot be canonized.

Moriani calls Briganti, who tells him to open an investigation proving vampires don't exist. He explains that since the publication of Bram Stoker's Dracula, belief in vampires is at an all-time high, and the Vatican wants to put a stop to this superstition. Moriani calls von Krüger, who claims vampirism is actually a blood disorder called the "P syndrome", and is thus scientifically explainable. He then heads to Budapest to meet Professor Irina Boczow, an expert in vampire lore. She tells him the history of vampirism, beginning with Lilith, and much to Moriani's surprise, reveals she believes vampires to be real. She gives him a book, The Lords of Twilight, published by the Thule Society, which says that to become a vampire one must complete The Path of the Dragon, an initiation ritual, something Tepes did in his youth.

Meanwhile, Luca decides to walk The Path of the Dragon alone, believing he will meet Dracula at the end, who he plans to kill. Moriani writes his report refuting vampires, but the next morning, Luca is found shot dead, and Moriani decides to take up Luca's plan. Amongst Calugarul's correspondence he finds evidence The Path begins where Tepes was held prisoner in Turkey, and so travels to the jail in the mountains, where he discovers prisoners were left as food for a creature living in the forest so she would spare the nearby villagers. Tepes, however, apparently escaped. Upon returning to Vladoviste, Moriani learns Ozana has been told by the Iron Guard to get him out of the inn, and the villagers no longer want to speak to him. He calls Boczow to tell her he plans to walk The Path to kill whatever he finds at the end of it, and she advises he come see her.

Upon arriving in Budapest, however, he finds her murdered. He returns to Vladoviste to find his friend, Dr. Maria Florescu, Calugarul's replacement, is missing. In a nearby shed, he discovers an unconscious Pekmester in a coffin. In the inn, he finds a bomb on his door. He disarms it, and Ozana tells him Pekmester and a man from Alba Iula had been in his room. He enters Pekmester's room, and discovers Pekmester and von Krüger are members of the Thule Society, and have been working with the Iron Guard. He also learns von Krüger has been in touch with a young member of the DAP, who he believes to be much more "enterprising" than Anton Drexler. As such, he has sent Pekmester an extract of a manifesto the young man is working on - an early version of Mein Kampf. Moriani ascertains von Krüger and Pekmester are attempting to walk The Path, which they believe ends in the Castle of Twilight, in an effort to become vampires. He also learns Pekmester has discovered Calugarul's grave to be empty.

Moriani is able to enter a secret passage in the hills leading into the Castle. In an underground labyrinth, he encounters Pekmester, who explains Florescu is a servant of Dracula. He went to see her in the dispensary hoping she would lead him to Dracula, but Dracula knocked him out, put him in the coffin and he woke up in the labyrinth. Eventually, Moriani enters the catacombs. Von Krüger arrives in the courtyard above, begging Moriani to let him down, but Moriani refuses. Florescu arrives, and reveals she is/was Calugarul. When she followed The Path with the intention of killing Dracula, he offered her immortality and her beauty back, and she accepted. She explains Pekmester killed both Luca and Boczow, and von Krüger is the head of the Thule Society, who wish for another World War. She wishes Moriani luck as Dracula himself approaches. However, Moriani ignites the bomb he disarmed at the inn, and the catacombs are destroyed. As Moriani dies, Pekmester laments they have lost their chance, but von Krüger assures him they will return. Unseen by any of them, a green vapour rises from the rubble into the air.

The game cuts to London in 1942. In a bunker, Captain Cunningham of the British Army is interrogating Pekmester. Cunningham wants to know the nature of a secret Nazi operation in 1941 headed by General von Krüger codenamed "Operation D". Pekmester asks Cunningham if the name Vlad Tepes means anything to him. Cunningham is dismissive, and Pekmester asks "Don't you believe in vampires?" as the lights in the room go out.

== Development ==
Dracula 3 was announced by publisher MC2 France and developer Kheops Studio in April 2007, shortly after the two companies reached an agreement to create the title. As a follow-up to Dracula: Resurrection and Dracula 2: The Last Sanctuary, the announcement ended a years-long period of inactivity for the series. However, Dracula 3 was not intended as a sequel to the first two games. Instead, it was designed as a "comprehensive change of perspective in the approach of the Dracula myth", according to Kheops' Benoît Hozjan. The project was initially scheduled for release during the 2007 holiday shopping season, but it underwent a delay to early 2008. After being retitled Dracula 3: The Path of the Dragon that February, the game launched in France on April 10, 2008.

=== Release and ports ===
To help promote the release of Path of the Dragon in North America, for Halloween 2008, Microïds ran a stencil-based pumpkin carving competition, the winners of which received a free copy of the game. Also for Halloween 2008, The American Red Cross held a Dracula themed Blood Drive at five locations in Northern California, where each donor was given a free copy of the game.

In late 2009, Anuman Interactive acquired the complete back catalogue of Microïds games, and in March 2010, announced Path of the Dragon was being ported to iOS by Tetraedge Games, published in three separate parts by Chillingo. Stéphane Longeard, director-general of Anuman, stated

With such strong titles as Dracula, Egypt and Amerzone from the Microïds portfolio, our objective is to reach the wider public on a multitude of platforms on an international level. Given Chillingo's know‐how and experience in the publishing, development and distribution of games on mobile devices, it made sense to us to assign the publication of the Dracula title on the iPhone and iPod Touch to them.

The iOS version proved a success, and upon the release of the third part, Alain Milly, Anuman's editorial-director stated "We are happy to see that our Dracula license has found its logical audience on iPhone and iPod Touch. This product has enabled us to test the adaptation of a proper license straight from the Microïds catalog on a mainstream audience. Other licenses will most certainly follow." In July 2010, HD versions of each of the three parts were released for the iPad.

In October 2010, Anuman announced the three-part iOS version would also be released for Windows, under the title of Dracula Series. Alain Milly explained the idea behind releasing the abridged version for the PC was

to let a wider audience explore the intriguing world of Dracula on their computer. The original version, which included a variety of difficult puzzles, was a challenge for hardcore gamers, but could dishearten occasional players. Now, the Dracula Series offers the possibility to those who don't spend as much time on video games the opportunity to access the same rich universe of the original Dracula and get immediate pleasure playing it.

Franck Berrois, producer of the Dracula Series, further explained "In the age of dematerializing content, dividing the story into three chapters presents an advantage for players. It enables them to download the part of the story that they want to play very quickly."

== Reception ==
Reception

Aggregate score
Aggregator	Score
Metacritic	65/100

Review scores
Publication	Score
Adventure Gamers	4/5
GameSpot	5/10
IGN	7.2/10
PC Gamer (US)	76%
Adventure Classic Gaming	5/5

Award
Publication	Award
Milthon Festival du Jeu Vidéo	Best Scenario (2008)

The PC version of the game received "mixed or average reviews," and holds an aggregate score of 65 out of 100 on Metacritic, based on eleven reviews. Combined global sales of Dracula 3 and its predecessors, Dracula and Dracula 2, reached 1 million copies by 2009.

Adventure Classic Gaming's Mervyn Graham scored the game 5 out of 5, calling it "amongst the best adventure games released in recent years." He praised the gameplay, writing "Dracula 3: The Path of the Dragon is a cut above the rest. Gamers will appreciate the effort that the developer has put into developing a convincing storyline that leads the player from country to country down the Path of the Dragon. Some puzzles are straightforward, but other puzzles are more perplexing, albeit logical."

Adventure Gamers' Cameron Urquhart scored it 4 out of 5. He praised how the game used factual historical information in its fictional narrative, and was also impressed with the graphics, sound and voice acting. He was also complimentary of the puzzles; "Rather than being loaded down with contrived puzzles for padding, Dracula 3 relies heavily on inventory puzzles, yet you are never resigned to trying everything on everything. The hotspots are almost always necessary, while puzzles are logical and accessible and never feel out of place." He concluded "The game rarely wows you in any one way, and the pace can drag at times in dry subject matter, but overall it's both logical and accessible, with [an] interesting approach to vampire lore and deftly crafted storyline."

IGN's Emily Balistrieri scored it 7.2 out of 10. She too praised the graphics, sound and voice acting but was critical of the puzzles, saying "forget blood-sucking, these puzzles are soul-sucking," and concluding "There are definitely gamers out there who, rather than dashing out boss brains, prefer to have their own splattered all over. The price of admission to a PC adventure with such high production quality might just be your sanity! If code breaking, chemistry, and arcane rituals are your ultimate brain-melt fondue, though, bare your neck for Dracula 3."

GameSpot's Brett Todd scored it 5 out of 10, writing, "Busywork puzzles and stone-age visuals drain the creeps out of this supposedly scary saga, which unfolds more like an uninspired detective story than an ominous encounter with a legendary monster." He was also critical of the graphics and sound; "Most scenes are grainy, and character models are afflicted with slow-motion movement tics that makes it seem like everybody you meet is underwater." He also disliked many of the puzzles, and concluded "Dracula 3 is dry, traditional, and stilted [...] Adventure gamers with a taste for methodical puzzle-solving could appreciate it, whereas everybody else will be too busy stifling yawns to feel any chills running down their spines. This is a vampire-inspired adventure by the numbers that holds few surprises in its dry puzzles and dated presentation values."

=== Awards ===
Benoît Hozjan's script for Path of the Dragon won the award for "Best Scenario" at the 2008 Milthon Festival du Jeu Vidéo. The game was also nominated in two other categories, "Best PC Game" and Yan Volsy for "Best Soundtrack", losing to TrackMania United Forever and Yubaba, Smith, and Fortune's score for Big Bang Mini, respectively.

Preceded by Dracula 2: The Last Sanctuary	Dracula game series	Succeeded by Dracula 4: The Shadow of the Dragon
