= Pierre Estève =

French musical artist

- Born: February 11, 1961 (age 65); Cahors, France
- Genres: world music, folk music, contemporary music, rock
- Occupations: musician, composer, songwriter
- Instruments: Vocals, guitar, piano, programming, multi-instrumentalist
- Years active: 1974–present
- Labels: WEA, Shooting Star
- Website: pierreesteve.com

Pierre Estève (born February 11, 1961, in Cahors, France), is an electric singer-songwriter and composer with a wide range of styles, a musician, a contemporary artist acclaimed for his digital installations and sound sculptures, as well as a researcher and a journalist writing for the French musical press. After benefiting from classical music and orchestra through training with the French Conservatoire de Musique institution, he is a specialist in virtual symphonic orchestras and world instruments. He is especially well known by the public for composing the music for the soundtrack to various video games, ads, documentaries and films. A multi-instrumentalist, he collects instruments from the five continents but also all kinds of natural and sonorous materials. Estève also creates installations based on interactions between the public with natural acoustic materials and technologies, using materials that he creates himself.

== Early life and education ==
Pierre Estève was born on February 11, 1961, in Cahors in the French Pyrenees, and spent most of his childhood in Avignon. He started to study music around the age of 4, and 2 years later he enrolled in the Conservatoire de Musique in Avignon where he took up his piano studies. During his childhood, Pierre was very sensitive to the sounds of the natural backgrounds he evolved within. His experiences are the source of his artistic interest in the world's musical instruments and sonorous materials.

It was during his teenage years when he wrote his first composition. After graduating high-school with a major in Maths and Science, he went on to study engineering in the Marseilles Maths Sup Institute. There he made the decision to devote himself entirely to his musical training.

Estève then studied conducting orchestras as well as baritone singing. He received diplomas in fugue, harmony, counterpoint and musical analysis, and then obtained the gold medals in guitar, chamber music and musical theory at the Conservatoires of Avignon and Montpellier.

== First steps in the music industry ==
Pierre Estève bought his first electrical guitar at the age of 13, and then in 1978 he purchased a Roland Jupiter-4 synthesizer on which he leads thorough, endless experimentations. The mastery he developed of those instruments led him to work as a session musician from a very young age, and that is when he created his first recordings. Around the age of 16, he joined a progressive rock band called "Aube en Hiver" (Winter Dawn) and he developed a series of compositions based on the Book of the Dead.

Around the middle of the eighties, the musician played as the first guitarist for the Canto General under the direction of Jean Golgevit. In 1987, he signed a contract license with WEA. He released his first solo recording, Atout Cœur, a 45 rpm vinyl record. Pierre Estève became one of the major artists in his record company which led him to make a few TV appearances. Feeling completely alien to the universe of television broadcasting, he developed an interest in writing soundtracks for the silver screen and, fulfilling a desire for autonomy, started writing the soundtrack to various commercials and promotional spots beginning in 1989.

In 1992 he recorded the first collaborative album for Radio France, under the name of Gloobi Doo-wap. Not released for sale, the record and the tracks therein were aimed at being used as musical illustrations for the radio stations in the group. During that period, he also writes new songs and develops several rock projects. The various orders which he delivered enabled him to acquire a recording studio.

== Into video game design ==
In 1995, he got in touch with Cryo Interactive, an editor and developer of video games. At that time the French game-making studio was working on the sequel to Dragon Lore, and offerrf him to direct and complete the sound design to the new episode. Intrigued by the innovations and structural and sonorous experimentations allowed by video games, he accepts to compose and record the soundtrack to Dragon Lore II within a very short span of time. Deriving his inspiration from composers such as Carl Orff or Basil Poledouris, he wrote a score in a baroque and epic spirit, with the addition of a few Oriental notes. Estève wished to go beyond the limitations of technology imposed by the instruments then available and samples his own sound library in order to obtain a satisfactory rendering. Owing to the technological limitations of the times, he had to elaborate most of his tracks from short patterns repeated in a loop, which he gradually and subtly builds upon. Indeed, each of the melodic loops had to keep within 512 kb and the final compositions were made up by blending them all together. Pierre Estève also built a sound motor with the help of the programmer of the game, which enabled him to create musical variations according to the scenario. This particular experiment was a defining moment in the composer's career as it was a first step towards the elaborations of interactive installations as from 2000. Dragon Lore II was released in December 1996 and the soundtrack was actually published as an album in 2009.

After his work on his game, Pierre founds the label called Shooting Star by the end of 1996, and his part will be to extend and produce sound content for the music and audiovisual industries. Shooting Star publishes Esteve's first solo album under the name Bamboo in early 1997. This album was planned to be the first of a series of recordings dedicated to sonorous materials and matters.

Pierre Estève also acted as a musical consultant on the music and the French dubbings of Versailles 1685, developed by Cryo. He also designs the sound effects of the cinematic for the two games which come after Versailles in the same collection: Egypt 1156 B.C.: Tomb of the Pharaoh (1997) and China: Intrigue in The Forbidden City (1998).

== From Atlantis to The 2nd World ==
With Dragon Lore II, Pierre Estève developed a passion for the interactions allowed by music and the virtual environment of video games. Round the end of 1996, he meets composer Stéphane Picq. In the same period of time, Cryo developed what would become one of the greatest successes of the studio: Atlantis which takes place on the lost continent in a time before Antiquity. A large part of the design of the game thus consisted in inventing the various cultural elements involved in making up the Atlantean society, and that would include the Continent's music. Estève and Picq thus offered to compose it, which offer the studio accepted.

The two musicians started to work together from the beginning of 1997 onwards. During the eighties, Pierre Estève had become more and more interested in world musical instruments bought either in Paris retailer shops or during journeys abroad. Thanks to this collection, Estève and Picq imagined and played a primordial music which matches the universe of the game, as they blend together various influences from all over the world, while they integrate electronic musical instruments. Each of them writes and plays approximately ten tracks and also collaborates on four tracks of the original soundtrack. Close to the creative team of Cryo, they also created the design of the game's aural atmosphere, especially when there is an interaction between the music and the sounds. The two composers drew from those random sound loops whose objective is to make certain atmospheres more lively, the goal being to avoid the player having the impression that a same audio loop keeps playing on and on in a given context.

Alongside those experiments, the two composers created an interactive, non-linear slide-show under the form of a travel diary in the world of Atlantis. For this they use various drawings and preparatory watercolours by Thomas Boulard, the graphic designer of the game, and integrate their own music into it. Numerous quotations from writers and known poets, or written by either of the two musicians, punctuate the ambulation, inspired by the atmospheres of the game. The whole lot gives a complementary vision of those. In 1997, Cryo launches Atlantis: The Lost Tales. So as to give the soundtrack its full dimension, Shooting Star published it as a double sound album with one interactive track under the English title of the game. The quality and great originality of the music are acclaimed by many magazines and periodicals, some of which not belonging to the press specialised in video gaming. The album rapidly met with success.

After this collaboration, Pierre Estève was chosen by Canal+ Multimedia in order to create the sound and music of their future games. The first of those, The 2nd World, developed by Cryo, was a pioneering experiment in the area of virtual online games. In this game the player is immersed and evolves in a 3D rendering of Paris. It was distributed with an adventure game which takes place in the same universe, Légendes Souterraines(Legend of the underground). Pierre Estève was in charge of designing the soundtrack to all of this and wrote music which departs from the exoticism of Atlantis, while still developing a syncretic sound with strong spiritual connotations, with between others Gregorian chants and mechanical sounds. The whole proved particularly dark, in perfect adequation with the very sombre context of the games.

The soundtrack was published and released by Shooting Star in parallel to those games. Like Atlantis: The Lost Tales, the CD contains an interactive CD-ROM track including original drawings by Stéphane Levallois, the designer of the two projects. They were introduced as a multimedia slideshow this time with a vast number of animations, making the experiment interactive. The 2nd World and Légendes Souterraines are published in 1997. The album, called Obscura, was released at the beginning of the following year.

In 1998, Estève was entrusted with the design of a soundtrack for a new Cryo production, a game of divine simulation called Deo Gratias. The composer makes up mystical atmospheres dealing with the original divine chaos, while including unusual pop sounds within some liturgic sounds. Following the request by a lot of fans, the album to the original soundtrack appeared in 2014, on a dematerialised media.

On the same year, the French publisher also worked on the adaptation of the comic book series Black Moon Chronicles, published by French publisher Dargaud, as a video game. The game takes place in the fantastic medieval universe created by the screenwriter François Marcela-Froideval. Pierre Estève writes the whole of the music and sound effects to this production. During the development, the TV channel La Cinquième shot a new story on the composer, entitled Au Son de la Lune ["To The Sound of the Moon"]. The original soundtrack was published in July 1999.

In 1999, Cryo created the sequel to Atlantis. Pierre is entirely in charge of the music of this new game. This time the script takes place after the submersion of the continent. The player is, through the means of trance, led to being incarnated in three characters from civilisations very far from each other in space and time. Estève thus combines the instruments in his collection which evoke more or less the countries visited throughout the game (Ireland, China and Yucatán). He endeavours to represent the universe not only physical but also spiritual of the cultures which the player meets with. The organisation of the soundtrack is built up in a segmented way in four parts. Estève uses certain music originally composed in a different way from Atlantis II. In this regard, the track entitled "Highlands" was written during a trip recently undertaken in Ireland and illustrates a part of the episode of the game situated in this country.

Atlantis II and its soundtrack are launched in November 1999. Once again, the soundtrack comes with a multimedia application including, between other things, artwork by Thomas Boulard, the main designer of the game. It also includes photos of several instruments used for the recording. The music is praised very highly for the wealth of sounds it contains as well as for the quality and the variety of the tracks. Owing to certain emotions raised by the game as well as by its soundtrack, the whole lot acquires a certain prestige with a part of the gaming community and there are still many testimonies about it.

== First Steps Towards the Audiovisual ==
In March 2000, a 52-minute documentary entitled 48 Hours with Pierre Estève is produced by the Game One Channel. The film follows the composer for two days in his daily work, his research activities and musical practices.

Pierre starts composing music for several short and full-length movies shot for the small screen. During this period, he works first of all on a series of documentaries produced by the ZED Company, then records many other productions at a very fast rate, the latter revolving around themes close to the concerns of the composer, which include the environment as well as the development of new technologies. En 2006 he is awarded with the " François de Roubaix " prize for the music of his film Les Samouraïs Noirs, by Jean Queyrat, at the FIFME in Toulon, in the South of France.

Metal, the second work in the series of the composer on materials, is released in 2001. In the sleeve notes, Estève explains most importantly the essential connection between this material and man, and more generally to life. He illustrates it through a series of instruments, borrowed from foreign cultures, ranging from the Dobro guitar to the gamelan from Java. The compositions and interpretations of the record consist in mixing together the sound of those instruments but also the cultures from which they are drawn.

The same year, he collaborates with Infogrames and Moulinsart Multimédia as he designs the sound environment to Tintin: Destination Adventure, featuring the famous character created by Belgian comic book author Hergé. Pierre develops a semantic specifically designed for the music of the game. For instance, a given instrument is associated with an action as it is taking place or with a certain character (Tintin, Snowie...), instead of being connected to the area of the world which it could possibly evoke (such as bagpipes for Scotland, for instance.) Indeed, the player is made to visit a number of countries. The game features Bianca Castafiore, the opera singer, singing the "Jewel Song" from Gounod's grand opera Faust: it is Pierre Estève himself who lends his voice to the singer. He also supervises the recording to the French dubbings.

The composer goes back to the Atlantis saga in 2004 with the game Atlantis Evolution, the fourth opus in the series. He composes a number of titles for it, and also uses songs already recorded for the first two episodes, only played anew or remixed for the occasion. Pierre Estève keeps experimenting on musical multicultural blends, through unusual instrumental associations such as a berimbau and a mouth-organ. A certain number of tracks are played with the help of synthesizers so as to better fit the atmosphere of the game, more associated with sci-fi than previous episodes. For certain phases of the game, as homage to eighties arcade games, he composes music in an electro style, which reminds one of the sound and style associated with the chiptune. Pierre is also entrusted with the sound design of game environments (jungle, village, cave, etc.).

In 2013, Pierre goes back to video game music, in composing in particular the original soundtracks to the adventure games Dracula 4: The Shadow of the Dragon and Dracula 5: The Blood Legacy, published by Anuman Interactive. So as to reproduce the atmosphere which underlies the game, Estève makes use of saturated electrical guitars or strident violins which personify the invisible presence of Count Dracula. Depending on the settings explored by the players, he also develops symphonic tracks, while others denote an atmosphere from the Far East. The soundtrack for both games was digitally released on November 21, 2014.

== Contemporary Artist: Flowers 2.0 ==
Started in February 2012, this project is in line with the reflection of the artist on materials and the interaction between it and man. In the previous works of the artist, the public was led to experimentation of elementary materials such as stone or wood. Flowers 2.0 are made up of several hundreds of plastic "flowers" entirely made up of recycled plastic bottles. The project is elaborated as a participatory art work with a view to promote sustainable development and an environmentally-conscious attitude by allowing the public to get involved in the elaboration of the installation, while developing creative sensibilities. People are invited not only to bring their own bottles, but also to create flowers, for which several systems of elaboration are considered ranging from the assembly of plastic bottles, to the adding of LEDs, allowing them to develop their own life cycle (they light up at night thanks to the energy gathered during the day).

In July 2012, Pierre Estève tries the project out for the first time during the NoWhere, a yearly artistic meeting taking place in Saragossa, in Spain. The installation then travels from Lausanne (Switzerland) to Montmorency (France) from November 2012 to March 2013. In April 2013, Pierre added a new participatory dimension to the project for the Parvis de La Défense, West of Paris. Next, Flowers 2.0 is installed in Sevran and Grenoble in France, in April 2014, where more than 900 children, the University Hospital Centre, the Festival des Détours de Babel, La Métro are invited to take part in the elaboration of flowers which gives birth to the exhibition of 2 000 flowers in the Natural History Museum of the city.

== Research ==
=== Sound matters ===
As a child, as he went out in the countryside, Pierre Estève was very sensitive to the sounds of the natural backgrounds, to the harmony and life that emerges thence. These experiences will later play a most important part in the artist's developing an interest in world musical instruments and, more fundamentally, the sound matters on which he began to lead ground research. Though his interest in such experiments may come through in commissioned projects such as Atlantis, they appear more conspicuously through a series of recordings he designed around materials and matters such as stone or water. The first of those, published by Shooting Star in 1996, is entitled Bamboo and revolve around the sounds obtained from this material exclusively. This is followed by Metal (second opus) in 2001. Eight others albums are being elaborated of which Stone and Stalactica. Although the first two albums were essentially played on previously existing instruments, Stalactica in particular is the fruit of years of research on the acoustic properties of caves, and particularly those of Isturitz, in the Basque Country. Recorded in the caves, the music is directly produced by natural formations such as stalactites, stalagmites and drapery.

=== New technologies ===
From 2000 on, Pierre Estève develops and sets up the first digital and sonorous installation in a series which is still going on at the present time. It is presented in 2002 when he is given carte blanche by Kraft Foods within the framework of the Café Show happening organised in the carrousel du Louvre in Paris. This installation triggers all the senses of the visitors through the use of four hollow bowls filled with coffee grains in which the participants dips their hands thus producing sounds, other sounds being produced through a swing, the movement of which is synchronised with images projected on a giant screen.

Over the years, the interest which Pierre has had for world instruments and in primordial cultures ever since his youth has turned into a fascination much deeper still for the natural materials themselves. Estève feels particularly close to the preoccupations of his time, in particular the emergency to find a solution to the world environmental problems. Through his work, he thus seeks to interrogate at various levels the relationship between the human being and the world, thus suppressing first and foremost the partitions induced by cultural conditioning. Through the medium of an interaction with the work, the spectator then becomes a "spect'actor" and loses the notion of time in order to better immerse him/herself into an inner, spiritual space.

Beyond Café Show, this thematic can be traced in a certain number of his installations, for instance Roc Gong. Created in 2009, it is made of a number of phonolite stones. Those are selected and prepared so as to offer idiosyncratic sounds, but still they keep they own original plastic ( esthétique ) and tactile aspect. Since they cannot be associated with any one culture in particular, those sonorous stones suppress the barrier which might for instance deter anyone not used to playing music from playing them, and so the public is invited to play of it.

=== Musical Instruments ===
It was in 1995, during the elaboration of Bamboo, that Pierre Estève started to put together a collection of world musical instruments. His workshop boasts in particular a Javanese historical gamelan which once belonged to the royal family of Yogyakarta, Raden Mas Jodjana, and also Celtic, Armenian and African instruments, ranging from the most elaborate pieces to the most primitive.

== Discography ==
=== Studio albums ===
Year	Album
1996	Bamboo
2001	Metal

=== Soundtrack albums ===
Year	Album
1997	Atlantis: The Lost Tales (with Stéphane Picq)
1998	Obscura (soundtrack from the video games The 2nd World and Légendes Souterraines)
1999	Black Moon Chronicles
1999	Atlantis II
2009	Dragon Lore II
2014	Deo Gratias
2014	Dracula
2020	Atlantis Evolution
