= Dracula 4: The Shadow of the Dragon =

2013 video game

- Developer: Koalabs Studio
- Publisher: Anuman
- Producer: Franck Berrios
- Designer: Marianne Tostivint
- Programmers: Xavier Bigand; Bruno Deligny
- Artist: Olivier Train
- Writer: Marianne Tostivint
- Composer: Pierre Estève
- Platforms: Windows, OS X, iOS, Android
- Release: Windows & OS X: WW: June 18, 2013; iOS: WW: December 5, 2013; Android: WW: March 13, 2014
- Genre: Point-and-click adventure
- Mode: Single-player

Dracula 4: The Shadow of the Dragon is a 2013 point-and-click adventure video game developed by Koalabs Studio for Microsoft Windows, OS X, iOS, and Android. It was published on all systems by Anuman under their Microïds brand. In 2013 the game was released on GOG.com, and in 2014 was bundled with its sequel, Dracula 5: The Blood Legacy. Later in 2014, the bundle was released on Steam.

The game follows 2000's Dracula: Resurrection and Dracula: The Last Sanctuary, and 2008's Dracula 3: The Path of the Dragon. The plot is unrelated to Resurrection and Last Sanctuary, but is the first of a two-part loose sequel to Path of the Dragon, telling the story of Ellen Cross, an art restorer employed at the Metropolitan Museum of Art. When a precious set of fifteen paintings is lost at sea during a storm, Ellen is called to investigate when one of the supposedly lost paintings is auctioned in Budapest. Her investigation soon brings her into contact with Bram Stoker's great-grandson, a mysterious uncatalogued sixteenth painting, and the legacy of Vlad Tepes. The second part of the story, Dracula 5: The Blood Legacy, was released in November 2013.

Shadow of the Dragon received very little attention in the mainstream gaming press, with limited coverage from professional critics, and what reviews it did receive were negative. Critics were especially disparaging about the length of the game, the linearity of the gameplay, and the implementation of the health system.

== Gameplay ==
A gameplay image from Shadow of the Dragon. Note the quick-access item holder in the bottom right corner (it is currently empty).

Shadow of the Dragon is a first-person point-and-click adventure game, with a minimalist HUD; a quick-access item holder, which allows the player to use an item without entering their inventory. The main inventory is accessible by clicking on the hand icon beside the quick-access holder. As well as the inventory, the player has access to a list of objectives, records of all conversations, records of all documents seen and collected, a summary of relevant information acquired, and options for the player to quit their game, or load a previously saved game. The game employs an autosave feature, which is activated at certain predetermined spots, or whenever the player quits to the main menu.

The game uses a basic point-and-click interface to move the player around and manipulate the game world, with player's perspective controlled by the mouse, although the game is also fully touchscreen operable on compatible operating systems. Within each screen, the player is free to look around 360 degrees. As the player moves the cursor around the screen it can change into different styles depending on the situation; neutral cursor (no interaction is possible), an arrow (the player can move in the direction indicated), a mouth (the player can speak to the character over whom the option appears), an eye (an area or object can be examined in more detail), a hand (the player can take the object), a cog (the player must use an inventory item to initiate interaction with the object), a left-right horizontal arrow (the object can be moved left and right), and an up-down vertical arrow (the object can be moved up and down).

A gameplay mechanic not seen in the previous Dracula games is a health system. The player character (Ellen Cross) suffers from a rare blood disorder which must be managed with medication. During the game, Cross' health continually decreases, and if it goes below a certain level, she becomes unable to move or perform tasks. The player has access to various types of medication throughout the game and can experiment with combinations to continually top off her health.

The game can be played in either "Adventure Mode" or "Casual Mode". In Casual Mode, interactive zones are automatically shown on-screen. Also in Casual Mode, after a set period of time elapses, players are given the option to skip puzzles. The game also features a points system and a series of in-game trophies, both of which are inactive if the player is playing in casual mode.

== Plot ==
The game begins with a tsunami engulfing a freighter carrying a priceless collection of fifteen paintings on their way from England to the Metropolitan Museum of Art. The ship is lost, as is the entire collection, along with their owner, Professor Vambery. The game then cuts to a tunnel leading into a columned room full of water, where a dark figure calls to "Ellen", telling her "the shadow is approaching." Ellen Cross, an art restorer who works for the Met, is then awakened in her apartment in New York by a telephone ringing. She answers it, and is told of the loss of the Vambery collection. She is next seen at her doctor's; Ellen suffers from an extremely rare blood disorder, and has just been told the medication which keeps her alive has been discontinued. Her doctor gives her a last supply of medication, and Ellen vows to live life to the full until the end. Several months later, Phillips, the director of the museum tells her one of the lost paintings has possibly surfaced at a private auction in Budapest and dispatches her to investigate if it is authentic.

Upon arriving, she meets Inspector Bizlos Lazlo, and determines the painting is definitely from the Vambery collection. Lazlo tells Ellen it was being sold by a man named Adrian Friedlen, a well-known petty thief. He refused to speak to the police, but, as he talks in his sleep, Lazlo set up a recorder in his cell. Ellen listens to a recording in which Friedlen warns "the master is approaching," looking for his mirror, and also refers to the "Prince of Exile." She hopes to speak to him, but Lazlo finds him dead in his cell. Although it appears as if he died of either natural causes, or possibly committed suicide, his face is contorted in terror, and a moment before he died all the security cameras in the police station stopped working. Lazlo and Ellen also discover Friedlen wrote "He's coming to kill me" on the wall of his cell. In his belongings, Ellen finds an encoded message, which she takes, unbeknownst to Lazlo.

She calls Phillips to tell him the painting is authentic, and he tells her Vambery's assistant has discovered Vambery added an uncatalogued sixteenth painting to the collection, but no one knows what it is. As such, he sends her to Vambery's residence in Whitby to see if she can find out anything about it. Once there, she meets Vambery's assistant, Adam Stoker, Bram Stoker's great-grandson. As Ellen explores the manor, she discovers a secret surveillance room in which she listens to an audio recording where Vambery talks of a portrait by an artist known as Kaneyek. Vambery is greatly disturbed by the portrait, which was handed down to him by his father, but although he fears it, he is unable to destroy it, and so he decides to ship it with the collection for New York without telling anyone. He reasons that putting the painting in a museum on the other side of the world will give him peace, and speculates that "he won't think to look for it there."

In the Vambery family tomb next to the house, Ellen finds a hidden vault in which she discovers a bust of Vlad Tepes. In a chest she finds garlic, a stake, silver bullets and a crucifix. This leads her to speculate the missing painting could be a portrait of Dracula. She also finds a wax cylinder, recorded by Herman van Bergen in 1870 (Fr. Arno Moriani also listens to this cylinder in Path of the Dragon). Van Bergen was Vambery's grandfather and made the recording after returning from the village of Vladoviste in Transylvania, where he had gone with his friend Ioan Hartner. Dracula had fallen in love with Hartner's wife, Luciana, and had initiated her onto "the Path of the Dragon." Van Bergen and Hartner followed them to Vladoviste, where van Bergen killed her by driving a stake through her heart. Dracula, however, eluded them. After listening to the recording, Ellen asks Stoker if he knows what the Path of the Dragon is, and Stoker tells her it is thought by some to be an initiation rite one must follow if one wants to become a vampire, although he himself doesn't believe in vampires.

Using a scytale, Ellen decodes Friedlen's note and finds the name and address of a painter called Yanek in Istanbul. She contacts Phillips, who informs her the modern form of Kaneyek is Yanek. As such, she is sent to Istanbul to find Yanek. When she arrives, he denies knowing Friedlen or having any paintings by Kaneyek. After he leaves his home, Ellen breaks in and finds two paintings from the Vambery collection. In the attic, she finds a body and a sealed case containing a painting. She takes the case and returns to her apartment, where she opens it. It is a portrait of Adam. As she looks at the picture, it suddenly comes to life, as Adam grows fangs and lunges at Ellen.

== Development ==
Shadow of the Dragon was first announced on November 22, 2012 when Anuman Interactive revealed the game was under development by Koalabs Studio and would be published under Anuman's Microïds brand.

Addressing why the game featured a contemporary story rather than one set directly after Path of the Dragon (which began in 1920, and ended in 1942), writer Marianne Tostivint explained, "At the beginning, we had several possibilities. We could either relocate the plot in Harker's Victorian England, continue Father Moriani's story or explore a new idea. We chose the third option because it offered more liberty to create a brand new story and introduce new characters." Artist Olivier Train further elaborated "Shadow of the Dragon follows on from previous game, but it is not a sequel. It really is an original story that is more based on the legends that have inspired Bram Stoker than Bram Stoker's book itself."

Speaking of the music, composer Pierre Estève stated "the players know that Dracula is around, that he is never very far away. Consequently, I chose to compose a theme with saturated electric guitars that create a shady, dark atmosphere that keeps the players in suspense. I use the vampire's noxious presence, that players can feel, rather than the character of Dracula as we know it."

== Reception ==
Reception

Aggregate score
Aggregator	Score
Metacritic	32/100

Review scores
Publication	Score
Adventure Gamers	1.5/5
Adventure Classic Gaming	2/5
GameBoomers	C

Shadow of the Dragon did not receive as much attention in the mainstream gaming press as any of the previous Dracula games, garnering very limited coverage from professional critics. What reviews it did receive were negative, with the PC version holding an aggregate score of 32 out of 100 on Metacritic.

Adventure Gamers' Rob Franklin scored the game 1.5 out of 5, calling it "a short-lived and painfully weak episodic prelude," and "a stunted three-hour 'episode' at best, and at worst a cynical attempt to sponge cash out of gamers with an unfinished product." He was impressed with the graphics in the opening cutscenes, the music, and the sound, but criticised the core gameplay, finding the puzzles too easy and the game too linear. He was also critical of the health system, which he called "desperately redundant." He concluded "Microïds have taken a three-hour prelude and made the purchasing public think it's a complete adventure game. In fact, your only reward for completing this game is a teaser for Dracula 5."

Adventure Classic Gaming's Mervyn Graham scored it 2 out of 5, finding many of the same faults as Franklin. He criticised the health system as "superfluous and irrelevant," and found the character animations "abysmal," although he praised the sound and music. He concluded by calling the game "a truncated experience that fails to satisfy the appetite of fans familiar with the series."

GameBoomers' Jenny100 scored the game a C. She found both the music and the voice acting average, but criticised the locations as "strangely lifeless." She was also critical of the autosave feature, which automatically overwrites the previous save. She concluded "Fans of Dracula 3 aren't likely to be satisfied if they're expecting a similar game. But Dracula 4 is not a bad game, and taken on its own merits it's just too short."

Preceded by Dracula 3: The Path of the Dragon	Dracula game series	Succeeded by Dracula 5: The Blood Legacy
