= Dracula 5: The Blood Legacy =

2013 video game

- Developer: Koalabs Studio
- Publisher: Anuman
- Producer: Franck Berrios
- Designer: Marianne Tostivint
- Programmers: Xavier Bigand; Bruno Deligny
- Artist: Olivier Train
- Writer: Marianne Tostivint
- Composer: Pierre Estève
- Platforms: Windows, iOS, Android, OS X
- Release: Windows: WW: November 2, 2013; iOS: WW: April 24, 2014; Android: WW: April 29, 2014; OS X: WW: May 30, 2014
- Genre: Point-and-click adventure
- Mode: Single-player

Dracula 5: The Blood Legacy is a 2013 point-and-click adventure video game developed by Koalabs Studio for Microsoft Windows, iOS, Android and OS X. It was published on all systems by Anuman under their Microïds brand. In 2014, the game was released on GOG.com and Steam, bundled with its prequel, Dracula 4: The Shadow of the Dragon.

The game follows 2000's Dracula: Resurrection and Dracula: The Last Sanctuary, 2008's Dracula 3: The Path of the Dragon and 2013's Dracula 4: The Shadow of the Dragon. The plot is unrelated to Resurrection and Last Sanctuary, but is instead the second of a two-part loose sequel to Path of the Dragon, continuing the story of Metropolitan Museum of Art art restorer Ellen Cross and her investigation into a mysterious portrait of Dracula. Ellen's journey leads her from New York to Istanbul to the Chernobyl Exclusion Zone, bringing her into contact with an ancient secret society founded by Vlad Tepes' brother Radu, and placing her in the middle of a 500-year-old conflict between the society and Dracula's followers.

The Blood Legacy received very little attention in the mainstream gaming press, with limited coverage from professional critics, and what reviews it did receive were negative. As with Shadow of the Dragon, the biggest criticism of the game was its length, but critics were also unimpressed with the plot, the graphics, and the identical gameplay to the previous game.

== Gameplay ==
A gameplay image from The Blood Legacy. Note the quick-access item holder in the bottom right corner (it is currently empty).

Gameplay in The Blood Legacy is identical to Shadow of the Dragon. The game is a first-person point-and-click adventure game, with a minimalist HUD; a quick-access item holder, which allows the player to use an item without entering their inventory. The main inventory is accessible by clicking on the hand icon beside the quick-access holder. As well as the inventory, the player has access to a list of objectives, records of all conversations, records of all documents seen and collected, a summary of relevant information acquired, and options for the player to quit their game, or load a previously saved game. The game employs an autosave feature, which is activated at certain predetermined spots, or whenever the player quits to the main menu.

The game uses a basic point-and-click interface to move the player around and manipulate the game world, with player's perspective controlled by the mouse, although the game is also fully touchscreen operable on compatible operating systems. Within each screen, the player is free to look around 360 degrees. As the player moves the cursor around the screen it can change into different styles depending on the situation; neutral cursor (no interaction is possible), an arrow (the player can move in the direction indicated), a mouth (the player can speak to the character over whom the option appears), an eye (an area or object can be examined in more detail), a hand (the player can take the object), a cog (the player must use an inventory item to initiate interaction with the object), a left-right horizontal arrow (the object can be moved left and right), and an up-down vertical arrow (the object can be moved up and down).

A gameplay mechanic not seen in the previous Dracula games (until Shadow of the Dragon) is a health system. The player character (Ellen Cross) suffers from a rare blood disorder which must be managed with medication. During the game, Cross' health continually decreases, and if it goes below a certain level, she becomes unable to move or perform tasks. The player has access to various types of medication throughout the game and can experiment with combinations to continually top off her health.

The game can be played in either "Adventure Mode" or "Casual Mode". In Casual Mode, interactive zones are automatically shown on-screen. Also in Casual Mode, after a set period of time elapses, players are given the option to skip puzzles. The game also features a points system and a series of in-game trophies, both of which are inactive if the player is playing in casual mode.

== Plot ==
The game begins with the final scene from Shadow of the Dragon; Ellen Cross, an art restorer from the Metropolitan Museum of Art, opening the uncatalogued sixteenth painting from the Vambery collection, which she believes to be a portrait of Dracula. Ellen is shocked, however, to instead see a portrait of Vambery's assistant, Adam Stoker, Bram Stoker's great-grandson, which suddenly comes to life, as Adam grows fangs and lunges at Ellen. However, this is revealed to have been a nightmare. In reality, Ellen has returned to New York with the painting unopened. Back at the Met, Phillips tells her the Turkish police found no body at Yanek's, who probably cleaned out his apartment after discovering Ellen had broken in. As such, they still have no idea who Yanek is working for, and why he was in possession of several of the lost Vambery paintings. Meanwhile, Ellen opens the painting to find it has been tarred over with a black cross. Her colleague Gerry Berowski tells her people used to paint crosses in black tar on their doors to ward off vampires. As Vambery seemed to have been afraid of the painting, Gerry speculates Vambery himself may have painted the cross.

Ellen removes the tar, revealing the portrait of Dracula. She puts the painting in storage, and then reads an unpublished biography of Vlad Tepes, which portrays him in a more positive light than usual. The book says Vlad's brother, Radu, was responsible for the suicide of Vlad's wife, telling her Vlad had been killed in battle and giving her a knife with which to kill herself. Vlad never recovered from her death, and turned to evil soon thereafter. The book explains Radu hated Vlad because when they were held prisoner by Sultan Murad II, Vlad had been released fourteen years prior to Radu. The book also reproduces a letter written by Radu in which he says "since you've refused to give me the gift you have thanks to me, my death is only the beginning of your torture. My blood will remain restless for as long as my vengeance goes unsatisfied, and throughout your lifetime, danger hangs over you."

Adam arrives to see Ellen, and back in her apartment, they sleep together. The next day, she finds a note from Adam promising to see her soon. She heads to the museum, but the painting has been stolen. Checking the surveillance footage, she sees Adam taking it. Meanwhile, a librarian friend of Gerry's leaves him a message telling him whilst she was researching Radu, she found a poem he had written called "The Shadow of the Dragon." Ellen reads the poem, which seems to offer instructions on how to find the headquarters of a secret society formed by Radu with the express purpose of gaining revenge against Vlad. Ellen realizes the poem is a guide to the headquarters of the society, and leads to the Basilica Cistern in Istanbul. She then gets a phonecall from a woman telling her Gerry is dead, and advising her to be careful, as powerful agents are working against her investigation. The woman also says her master knows the painting is missing, and would be very grateful if Ellen could bring it to him.

She heads to Turkey, and finds the headquarters. In display cases, she finds several items, including the diary of Fr. Arno Moriani (the protagonist of Path of the Dragon) and notes on a series of eugenics experiments called "Operation D" (referred to in the final scene of Path of the Dragon). The dagger used by Vlad's wife to kill herself, allegedly one of the few items capable of harming Dracula, is also supposed to be there, but is missing. Ellen learns the present day leader of the society is Adam, who is a direct descendant of Radu. She concludes Adam plans to kill Dracula using the dagger, and stole the painting as a way to draw Dracula out. With no other leads to follow, she returns to see Yanek.

He reveals he is a vampire, serving Dracula, who has forbidden his followers to harm Ellen. Yanek explains he is really Kaneyek, the painter of the portrait, which is more than just a painting. In fact, it allows Dracula to see through it, which was why Vambrey was so afraid of it, and why he covered it with tar. He tells her Dracula became a vampire by drinking his dead wife's blood, but because all vampires originate from Dracula, no vampire can harm him. Only a vampire born independently of Dracula can destroy him, and the only way for the creation of such a vampire is if someone else were to drink his wife's blood, which he wears in a vial around his neck. He also tells her she is pregnant with Adam's child. Yanek and Ellen conclude this must be Adam's goal, and with Yanek's instructions, Ellen heads to the Chernobyl Exclusion Zone to meet Dracula.

In an underground castle, he tells her Adam is imprisoned nearby, and asks her to retrieve his portrait. She goes to Adam, and tells him about the baby. He promises that if she saves him, he will give her the portrait, and they can escape together. She opens his cell, but faints. Adam carries her body to Dracula, and tries to stab him with the knife. However, Dracula avoids the attack, and knocks Adam out. Impressed with Ellen, he offers her his wife's blood to drink. The player is given the choice as to whether to accept it or not. If the player does so, Ellen becomes a vampire. If the player does not, Dracula kills her. However, unseen by Dracula, Adam is able to drink some of his wife's blood.

== Development ==
The Blood Legacy was first announced on August 23, 2013, at Gamescom, when Anuman Interactive revealed the game was under development by Koalabs Studio and would be published under Anuman's Microïds brand.

In relation to the game's story, the character of Professor Vambery was partly inspired by Ármin Vámbéry, a Turkologist, who stayed with Bram Stoker in London prior to the composition of Dracula, and is said to have influenced many elements of the novel, including the depiction of Dracula himself. The concept of Dracula's wife killing herself after being tricked into thinking he had died was taken primarily from Francis Ford Coppola's 1992 film Bram Stoker's Dracula. The captivity of Vlad Tepes and his brother Radu by Sultan Murad II, with Radu remaining with the Sultan longer than Vlad, and their imprisonment driving a wedge between the brothers, is very loosely based on historical fact. In reality, in 1442, Vlad II Dracul took his two eldest sons, Vlad and his half-brother Mircea, to meet Murad, who had supported Dracul in securing the throne of Wallachia. However, Murad took them prisoner. Both brothers were released in 1448, by which time their younger brother, Radu had earned the nickname "Radu cel Frumos" ("Radu the Handsome") and become friends with Murad's son, Mehmet, earning Vlad's enmity, due to his hatred of the Turks. Radu eventually converted to Islam and entered Ottoman service, alienating Vlad even more.

== Reception ==
Reception

Aggregate score
Aggregator	Score
GameRankings	45%

Review scores
Publication	Score
Adventure Gamers	1.5/5
Adventure Classic Gaming	3/5
GameBoomers	C

The Blood Legacy received little attention in the gaming press, garnering very limited coverage from professional critics. What reviews it did receive were negative, with the PC version holding an aggregate score of 45% on GameRankings.

Adventure Gamers' Rob Franklin scored the game 1.5 out of 5, calling it "simply the second half of a game that should have shipped as a complete Dracula 4." Of the gameplay, he wrote "Puzzles are painfully obvious from the outset, with little to no challenge as you proceed." He concluded "For anyone who enjoyed Dracula 4, the final half of this two-part adventure is more of the same. The Blood Legacy won't give you any sense of closure in its own right, but it will at least resolve the unsatisfactory cliffhanger from the previous instalment. For everyone else, this is merely a second incomplete Dracula game that can only be taken seriously when paired with its predecessor."

Adventure Classic Gaming's Mervyn Graham scored the game 3 out of 5, writing "Dracula 5: The Blood Legacy plays neither as a standalone game nor as a true sequel to the series. Instead, it plays more like the second part of a full game that begins with the previous game." He was critical of several aspects, including the linearity of the gameplay, and the graphics, calling the character animations "abysmal," and criticising the lack of lip syncing. He concluded "despite being better than Dracula 4: The Shadow of the Dragon, Dracula 5: The Blood Legacy still leaves much to be desired."

GameBoomers' Jenny100 gave the game a C, making a similar point about the length of the game; "It's essentially Part 2 of Dracula 4, takes about the same time to play, and has the same shortcomings. Both Dracula 4 and Dracula 5 together are still shorter than the games we used to get from Kheops and older companies that used to make first person games."

Preceded by Dracula 4: The Shadow of the Dragon	Dracula game series	Succeeded by None
