= Tintin: Destination Adventure =

2001 video game

- Developers: Infogrames; Runecraft (Windows)
- Publisher: Infogrames
- Designer: Moulinsart
- Composer: Pierre Estève
- Platforms: PlayStation, Microsoft Windows
- Release: 2001
- Genre: Adventure
- Mode: Single-player

Tintin: Destination Adventure (French: Tintin: Objectif Aventure) is a video game loosely based on the series The Adventures of Tintin, the comics series by Belgian cartoonist Hergé. It was released for Microsoft Windows and PlayStation in Europe in 2001.

== Gameplay ==
The gameplay is similar to the previous two Tintin games (Prisoners of the Sun and Tintin in Tibet), with the exception in some parts where the player can operate vehicles. Aside from this the only other enhancement is the use of full 3D for the game.
