= Metal (Pierre Estève album) =

Studio album by Pierre Estève
- Released: 2001
- Genre: Ambient, world music, contemporary folk
- Length: 66:54
- Label: Shooting Star
- Producer: Pierre Estève

Pierre Estève chronology
Atlantis II (1999)	Metal (2001)	Dragon Lore II (2009)

Metal is the sixth album by French composer Pierre Estève and was released in 2001 by Shooting Star. It is the second album after Bamboo from Esteve's MADe IN series, based on matters from Chinese instrument classification.

== Track listing ==
All tracks are written by Pierre Estève

No.	Title	Length
1.	"Klondike part 1"
2.	"Eldorado"
3.	"Along the Railways"
4.	"Orichalque"
5.	"Jungle Growl"
6.	"Sounds of Brass"
7.	"Mineral Dreams"
8.	"Iron Horse"
9.	"El Kemeira"
10.	"Bouncing Spring"
11.	"An Bar"
12.	"Steel Waves"
13.	"Klondike part 2"
Total length:		66:54

== Personnel ==
Musicians

- Pierre Estève
- Ramon Fossati
- Axel Lecourt
- Alain Rouault

== Release history ==
Region	Date	Label	Format	Catalog
France	2001	Shooting Star	CD	Shoot-02
