= Opération Teddy Bear =

1996 video game

- Developer: Index+
- Publisher: Flammarion
- Composer: Olivier Pryzlack
- Platform: Windows/Mac

Opération Teddy Bear is an educational comic strip video game released in 1996. It was developed by Index+ and a co-production with Flammarion, and is written by Edouard Lussan.

The game covers Normandy, on 5 July 1944 and teaches the player about the history of the Second World War. A clandestine network hides plans belonging to the Nazis in Paul's teddy bear.

Bruno de Sa Moreira became interested in the digital space in 1990s and became head of Flammarion Multimedia. He then met Edouard Lussan, and produced with him the CD-ROM "Operation Teddy Bear".

The term "interactive comic." was coined by Edouard Lussan, although alternate terminology exists.

The game started Index's niche of educational family games, and its success inspired the company to create the first interactive comic book on CD-Rom "The Diabolical Trap" Ambers suggests that while digital comics began in the 1990s, this title was a proto example, constructed as a near point-and-click video game. Interface Online notes how the game's twin slider "integrate[s] the cursor as a contribution of information on the action".

The game features 73 screens of BD, 3 hours of fiction, 300 animations, 36 animated maps, 200 historical screens and more than 300 archive photographs.

InterDoc gave it 88%. Libration felt it was a successful attempt at marrying two incompatible elements: comics and multimedia. Feibel deemed it "Excellently designed, imaginative navigation and content-based". A journal article in Leonardo Online deemed it a " good comic strip". An article in François-Rabelais University Presses called it a " complete and complex work". The Presence of the Past in Children's Literature suggests that the work can be viewed as either a documentary or a work of fiction due to the way it is constructed. La Crioz felt the game made a "strong impression". Hypermedia felt the game "insist[ed] on the strict linearity of the comic narrative ".

It was awarded the 1997 Gold Milia, edutainment category. It was Best Prize winner of the "Package" category at Multimedia Grand Prize, 1997. Additionally it received the Totem prize at the 1997 Montreuil Youth Book Fair.
