= Atlantis III: The New World =

2001 video game

- Developer: Cryo Interactive
- Publishers: EU: Cryo Interactive; NA: DreamCatcher Interactive
- Designer: Johan Robson
- Writer: Johan Robson
- Composer: David Rhodes
- Platforms: Windows, PlayStation 2, iOS, Android
- Release: Windows: FRA: 26 September 2001; UK: 26 October 2001; NA: 3 December 2001; PlayStation 2: EU: 18 December 2001; iOS: WW: January 2012; Android: WW: February 2013
- Genre: Adventure
- Mode: Single-player

Atlantis III: The New World, (French: Atlantis III: Le Nouveau Monde, known as Beyond Atlantis II in North America), is a 2001 fantasy adventure video game developed and published by Cryo Interactive, with Dreamcatcher Interactive publishing the game in North America. David Rhodes composed the musical score. It is the third game in the Atlantis series by Cryo, as well as the last one made before Cryo's closure. It was followed by Atlantis Evolution in 2004.

== Plot ==
The player is a young Egyptologist looking for a city in the desert.

== Gameplay ==
The game is a first-person, pre-rendered, point-and-click adventure.

== Reception ==
Reception

Aggregate scores
Aggregator	Score
GameRankings	75.50%
Metacritic	75%

Market research firm PC Data reported that Atlantis III sold 10,200 retail units in North America for 2001, and 24,927 during the first six months of 2002. Its retail sales in the region for 2003 totaled 7,637 units. The combined global sales of Atlantis III and its predecessors, Atlantis and Atlantis II, surpassed 1 million units by 2004. According to review aggregation website Metacritic, the game received "generally favorable reviews" from critics.

Staci Krause of IGN positively compared the game to Schizm and Road to India, praising its storyline as being both well developed and engaging. Ron Dulin of GameSpot thought that the game lacked any sense of narrative cohesion, and instead focused on visually appealing environments and interesting puzzles. Absolute Games gave the game a rating of 60%.

Atlantis III was a nominee for GameSpot's 2001 "Best Adventure Game" award, which ultimately went to Myst III: Exile. The editors wrote: "Beyond Atlantis II is full of strange puzzles and metaphysical gobbledygook. But the constant barrage of strangeness actually works in the game's favor".

== See also ==
- Riddle of the Sphinx: An Egyptian Adventure
- Schizm: Mysterious Journey
