= The Secrets of Atlantis: The Sacred Legacy =

2006 video game

- Developer: Atlantis Interactive Entertainment
- Platforms: Microsoft Windows; Mac OS X iOS
- Release: November 3, 2006: EU: 2006-11-03; NA: 2007-05-31
- Genre: Adventure
- Mode: Single-player

The Secrets of Atlantis: The Sacred Legacy is a 2006 graphic adventure game developed by the French studio Atlantis Interactive Entertainment and published by Nobilis. It is the fifth and latest game in the Atlantis series started by Cryo, and the second one made by Atlantis Interactive Entertainment, following Atlantis Evolution.

== Gameplay ==
The gameplay is similar the other Atlantis games. The player moves around in a first person view, similar to Myst or Ages.

== Story ==
In 1937, Howard Brooks, a young aeronautical engineer, returns from a conference in Germany. On board the zeppelin LZ 129 Hindenburg taking him to New York, Howard is attacked by members of an occult sect.

When Howard wakes up in the Hindenburg, he finds himself alone. Eventually he meets a man claiming to have followed him for a long time, and that he and Howard are the last ones left on the zeppelin.

He soon learns that these evildoers covet the mysterious secret of a forgotten civilization of which, it seems, he is the heir. Convinced that Howard has a key element of their research, they decide to set a trap for him.

Caught up by his past, Howard sets out on an adventure that leads him, by turns, to several locations: Macao, an Indian palace, a temple in Mesopotamia and the Empire State Building in New York.

== Reception ==
Reception

Aggregate score
Aggregator	Score
Metacritic	48/100

Review scores
Publication	Score
Adventure Gamers	4/5
GameSpot	3.3/10
GamesRadar+	1.5/5

The Secrets of Atlantis received "generally unfavorable reviews" from critics, according to Metacritic.
