= Atlantis Evolution =

2004 video game

- Developer: Atlantis Interactive Entertainment
- Publisher: The Adventure Company
- Director: Desmond Oku
- Producer: Luc Verdier
- Programmer: Éric Safar
- Writer: Johan Robson
- Composer: Pierre Estève
- Series: Atlantis
- Platforms: Microsoft Windows; iOS; OS X
- Release: October 15, 2004: Microsoft Windows; October 15, 2004; iOS; October 20, 2012; OSX; October 26, 2012
- Genre: Adventure

Atlantis Evolution is a 2004 graphic adventure game developed by French studio Atlantis Interactive Entertainment and published by The Adventure Company. It is the fourth in the Atlantis series by Cryo, and the first one made by Atlantis Interactive Entertainment, founded by former Cryo developers. Unlike the second and the third game in the series, the game revolves entirely around Atlantis. It was followed by The Secrets of Atlantis: The Sacred Legacy in 2006.

== Story ==
Near the beginning of the 20th century a 25-year-old journalist named Curtis Hewitt returns home from Patagonia. On his journey, he encounters a storm, which brings him to the world of Atlantis. Here he meets the native people and embarks on a quest to free them from their tyrannical gods.

== Development ==
Atlantis Evolution was first revealed by DreamCatcher Interactive in April 2003, as part of several announcements by the company in preparation for the 2003 Electronic Entertainment Expo (E3). The game was initially developed by DreamCatcher Europe, a company formed when DreamCatcher absorbed parts of Cryo Interactive, its defunct parent. However, in the summer, DreamCatcher Europe shuttered the game development divisions it had carried over from Cryo. Around September, the new company Atlantis Interactive Entertainment was founded by ex-Cryo employees; it ultimately became the game's developer.

== Reception ==
Reception

Review score
| Publication | Score |
|---|---|
| Jeux Video | 11/20 |
