= Adamczewski =

Adamczewski is a Polish surname. Notable people with the surname include:

- Henri Adamczewski, French linguist
- Matthias Adamczewski, German sailor
- Saul Adamczewski, English guitarist
- Teresa Stanisławska-Adamczewska
