= Dalit Lahav-Durst =

Brazilian art historian

- דלית להב-דורסט
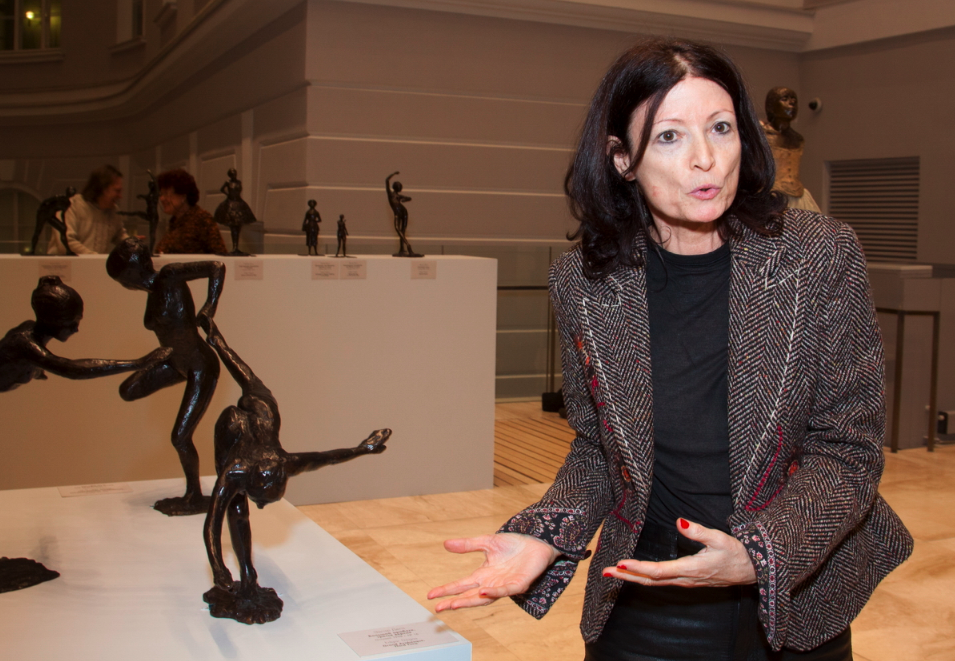
- Born: Jerusalem, Israel
- Occupations: Author, editor, executive, curator
- Writing career
- Pen name: Dalit L. Durst
- Language: Hebrew, French, Portuguese, Spanish and English
- Genres: Translations, art history

Dalit L. Durst (Hebrew: דלית להב-דורסט; born 1956 as Dalit Lahav) is an author, translator, curator and art historian of both Israeli and French nationalities. Former chief curator at the M.T. Abraham Foundation and head of the Cultural Exchange and Academic Department at the Hermitage Foundation Israel, she has curated exhibitions in Europe (Greece, Bulgaria, Croatia), dedicated to the sculpture of Edgar Degas. In December 2013 she co-curated the exhibition "Edgar Degas: Figures in Motion" at The State Hermitage Museum in Saint Petersburg, Russia. In 2016 she curated an exhibition of Degas' 74 bronze sculptures at MGM Art Space in Macau. Lahav-Durst works with a broad range of artists. Fluent in multiple languages, she has co-authored and translated over 15 books.

== Early years ==
Dalit Lahav-Durst (originally named Dalit Lahav) was born in 1956, and is of both Israeli and French nationality. She grew up in Sao Paulo, Brazil, where she studied comparative literature at the USP. She later moved to Paris, France, where she focused on art history, criticism, and conservation at New Sorbonne University. Her languages include Hebrew, French, Portuguese, Spanish and English.

== Career ==
=== Writing ===
She has worked as an art critic and editor for a number of Hebrew-language newspapers, including Ma'ariv Daily, and she has translated a number of books into Hebrew, including The Immortal by Jorge Luis Borges, O Aleph by Paulo Coelho, Dom Casmurro by Machado de Assis, and Tselalim (Sombras em Telavive) by Manuel Poppe.

=== Curation, symposiums ===
Early years, World War II

Many of her curated exhibits and organized symposiums have involved World War II. In 1996, she organized the "European Meeting of Holocaust Archival Centers" (at UNESCO headquarters in Paris), with the participation of historians, archive keepers and researchers from 25 countries. She was curator and artistic events organizer at the Memorial to the Unknown Jewish Martyr (Mémorial du Martyr Juif Inconnu) and the Jewish Contemporary Documentation Center in Paris. While at the center she worked with artists such as sculptor Shlomo Selinger, and the photographers Ruth Goodwin and William Betsch, among others.

Since 2005, Durst has worked as a consultant and art curator for several private collectors, and was the representative of the Tel-Aviv Foundation in France She also acts a consultant for the CulturalHeritage.cc Foundation. As of 2014 she is Head of the Cultural Exchange and Academic Department at the Hermitage Foundation Israel.

Since June 2008 she has been the chief curator at the M.T. Abraham Foundation. While representing the foundation, she coordinated and supervised the following exhibitions: The Sculpture of Edgar Degas at the Tel Aviv Museum of Art, Israel, (2010), The Complete Sculptures of Edgar Degas at the Herakleidon Museum, Athens, Greece, (2010), The Complete Sculptures of Edgar Degas at the National Art Gallery, Sofia, Bulgaria (2010), The Complete Sculptures of Edgar Degas at the Varna Archaeological Museum, Bulgaria, (2010), The Sculpture of Edgar Degas at The Evagoras Lanitis Center, Limassol, Cyprus, (2011–2012), Edgar Degas Complete Sculpture at Galerija Klovićevi dvori, Zagreb, Croatia (2012). In 2013 Durst co-curated the Degas in Motion exhibit at the Hermitage Museum in St. Petersburg, and also co-authored sections of the illustrated catalog published by Petronius.

== Selected works ==
Co-Author

- Reading the Walls (2007) - on memorial plaques in Paris

Editor

- Guide des Archives sur la Shoah (2000)
- Notes from a Coffeehouse (Maxim Gilan, 2014)

Translations

Among her literary translations into Hebrew are:

- Dom Casmurro by Machado de Assis (Gvanim, Hebrew ed. 1997)
- A Noiva Judia by Pedro Paixão (Yaron Golan, Hebrew ed. 1992)
- “Vendredi Soir” by Emmanuele Bernheim (Bitan, Hebrew ed. 1999)
- La Nieve del Almirante (The Snow of the Admiral) by Álvaro Mutis (Bitan, Hebrew ed. 2000)
- A Mulher Nua by Manuel Pope (Bitan, Hebrew ed. 2001)
- "The Immortal" by Jorge Luis Borges (Emda, Literary Review, n° 10, Hebrew ed. 2002)
- Sa Majesté la Mort by Myriam Anissimov (Kinneret, Hebrew ed. 2003)
- Sombras em Telavive by Manuel Pope (Yaron Golan, Hebrew ed. 2003)
- Zola by Henri Troyat (Kinneret, Zmora-Bitan, Dvir, Hebrew ed. 2005)
- Two Portuguese novels by Branquinho da Fonseca (Maba, Hebrew ed. 2009)
- O Aleph by Paulo Coelho (Miskal-Yedioth Ahronoth Books and Chemed Books, Hebrew ed. 2012)
- Manuscript Found in Accra by Paulo Coelho (Miskal-Yedioth Ahronoth Books and Chemed Books, Hebrew ed. 2013)
- Barba Ensopada de Sangue (Blood-soaked Beard) by Daniel Galera (Penn Yedioth Ahronoth Books, Hebrew ed. 2014)
