= Ruth Yardeni–Katz =

Israeli children author

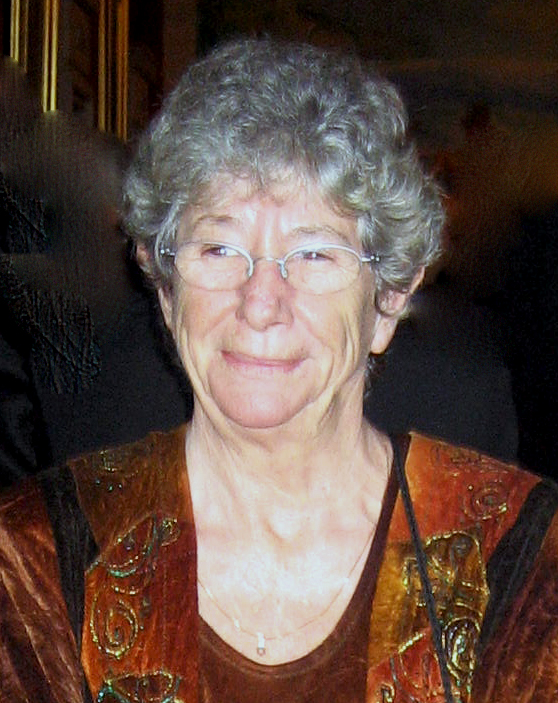
- Ruth Yardeni Katz in the 2008 Kavli Prize ceremony
- Native name: רות ירדני-כץ
- Born: August 19, 1943 Jerusalem, British mandate of Palestine
- Died: December 18, 2017 (aged 74)
- Occupation: Author, educator
- Citizenship: Israel
- Genre: Children's literature
- Spouse: Yossi Katz

Ruth Yardeni–Katz (Hebrew: רות ירדני-כץ; August 19, 1943 – December 18, 2017) was an Israeli author of children's and adult literature and an educator.

== Biography ==
Yardeni-Katz was born on August 19, 1943, in Jerusalem. After completing her military service, she studied in a beth midrash for youth counsellors in Haifa and completed a course for youth counsellors in Tel Aviv University. In the following years she worked in several informal education facilities and served as the director of arts in the Jerusalem Municipality.

Yardeni-Katz married Yossi Katz a professor of theoretical physics at the Hebrew University and had two children. Her son is the chef Michael Katz.

Yardeni-Katz started her writing career in 1981 with the book The Hero of the Class. She also wrote stories to several children's magazines such as Davar for Kids and Our Land.

She retired at age 51 and started to write full time. As part as her husband's work she travelled the world including in Japan where she wrote her book Japan, A Different Land. She published her travel experiences in the Davar magazine.

Se died December 18, 2017, and at her direction, her body was donated to science.

== Bibliography ==
- 1981 The Hero of the Class, illustrated by David Susna, Elishar (הגיבור של הכיתה)
- 1986 Aunt Sophia and Angel Gabriel, with Yossi Stern, Keter (הדודה סופיה והמלאך גבריאל)
- 1986 Albert Einstein: A Story of a Genius, Illustrated by David Susna, Keter (אלברט איינשטיין: סיפורו של גאון)
- 1990 Who is this Madman, illustrated by Moshe Levin, Yaron Golan (מי המשוגע הזה)
- 1991 A Big Colorfull Kite, illustrated by Moshe Levin, Yaron Golan (עפיפון גדול וצבעוני)
- 1992/3 The Big Lego Game of the God, illustrated by Noga Adler, Yaron Golan (משחק הלגו של האלוהים)
- 1996 Japan, A Different Land, Yaron Golan (יפן, ארץ אחרת)
- 1999 A Sunshine in Atlit, illustrated by Yossi Stern, Amir (קרן אור בעתלית)
- 2001 The Drawer of Secrets, illustrated by Lena Luktzki, Amir (מגרת הסודות)
- 2008 A Kiss, Amir (נשיקה)
