= Krief =

Krief is a surname of Sephardic Jewish origin coming from the North Africa. It can also be found among French families. Notable people with the surname include:

- Bérengère Krief (born 1983), French actress and comedian
- Nicolas Krief, Canadian filmmaker and screenwriter
- Norbert Krief (born 1956), French rock guitarist
- Patrick Krief (born 1979), Canadian musician and singer-songwriter
- Thomas Krief (born 1993), French freestyle skier

== See also ==
- Annie Ousset-Krief (born 1954), French historian and professor
