= Trafic (journal) =

French arts and letters journal focusing on cinema

Trafic: Revue de cinéma is a French arts and letters journal focusing on cinema. The journal enjoys a significant position in debates about cinema and the moving image in France, and to a lesser degree internationally, due to the varied and extensive list of authors who have contributed to it over the past three decades. These have included philosophers such as Giorgio Agemben and Jacques Rancière, film scholars such as Jacques Aumont, filmmakers such as João César Monteiro, and critics such as Kent Jones and Jonathan Rosenbaum.

Trafic is published by P.O.L, the publishing house established in 1983 by Paul Otchakovsky-Laurens, director of the autobiographical documentary Editeur (2017) in which he meditates on his experiences working with "the great names of contemporary literature" who lent prestige to his press. These "great names" include Serge Daney, who founded Trafic. Garin Dowd, Professor of Critical Theory and Film at the London College of Music and Media, describes Daney as "widely recognized in his homeland as the most important French film critic after André Bazin." The journal Trafic, subsequent to Daney's "death from AIDS in 1992, has continued his legacy," its first issue appearing in Winter 1991 (available January 1992). Alongside Serge Daney and Jean-Claude Biette, the journal's co-founder, the editorial board also included Raymond Bellour, Sylvie Pierre and Patrice Rollet, with Otchakovsky-Laurens acting as supervising editor. Daney's death in 1992, and later that of Jean-Claude Biette from a heart attack in 2003, reduced the number of editors to three, with Marcos Uzal joining later.
