= Ousset =

Ousset is a French surname. Notable people with the surname include:

- Cécile Ousset (born 1936), French pianist
- Jean Ousset (1914-1994), French ideologist

== See also ==
- Annie Ousset-Krief (born 1954), French historian and professor
