= Patricia de Souza =

Peruvian writer (1964–2019)

- Born: Úrsula María Patricia de Souza López; 1964; Coracora, Peru
- Died: 24 October 2019 (aged 54–55); Paris, France
- Education: University of Sorbonne Nouvelle Paris 3
- Occupations: Writer, translator and teacher
- Employer: El País
- Partner: Olivier Guyonneau
- Website: palincestos.blogspot.com

Patricia de Souza (1964 – 24 October 2019) was a Peruvian writer. She was a Spanish translator of the poetry of Michel Leiris and the narrative of Jean Echenoz, she was the author of a dozen novels, including Cuando llegue la noche.

== Biography ==
Patricia de Souza was born in Coracora, Ayacucho. His childhood was spent in Chaclacayo, on the outskirts of the city of Lima. Bachelor of Arts, she studied political science, journalism and philosophy. She completed her doctoral thesis in French Literature on Flora Tristan and Lautréamont, extraterritoriality and translation at the University of Sorbonne Nouvelle Paris 3. She worked at Caretas magazine and taught French at the National University of San Marcos.

Her first novel, Cuando llegue la noche (1994), aroused public interest for its maturity and for the issues it addressed: violence, uprooting, loneliness... However, the author stated that her work was an analysis of the speech that women make in the work. In her work, the writer shows the new models of women, within the perspective of equality, in which she seeks a break with the traditional roles of women. Collaborator in the collective work Líneas aéreas (1999). Among her most representative works El último cuerpo de Úrsula (2000) controversial work in Spain has been translated into English, French and German, and Electra en la ciudad (2006). Her second novel La mentira de un fauno, was published in Spain and Peru. The French literary magazine of l'NRF (Gallimard), published a short text Désert. The last published works were Ellos dos (2007), Erótika, escenas de la vida sexual (2008), Tristán (2010) and the novel Vergüenza (2014). She wrote for the Spanish newspaper El País and other media in Mexico.

The news of her death was made known by her partner Olivier Guyonneau through social networks, the writer who lived in Paris, died at fifty-five due to a serious illness.

== Works ==
- Cuando llegue la noche (Lima, Jaime Campodónico, 1995);
- La mentira de un fauno (Madrid, Lengua de Trapo, 1999);
- El último cuerpo de Úrsula (Barcelona, Seix Barral, 2000); (Lima, [sic], 2009), translated into german, Lateinamerika verlag, Solothurn 2005.
- Stabat Mater (Madrid, Debate, 2001);
- Electra en la ciudad (Madrid, Alfaguara, 2006);
- Aquella imagen que transpira (Lima, Sarita Cartonera, 2006).
- Ellos dos (Lima, publisher San Marcos), 2007. Jus, Mexico 2009.
- Erótika, escenas de la vida sexual (Mexico, publisher Jus), 2008. Barataria, 2009, Spain.
- Tristán (novel), Lima, Ediciones Altazor, 2010.
- Eva no tiene paraíso (essay), Lima, Ediciones Altazor, 2011.
- Vergüenza (novel), Casa de Cartón, Madrid, 2014.
- Descolonizar el lenguaje (essay), Los Libros de la Mujer Rota, 2015.
- Mujeres que trepan a los árboles, Trifaldi, Madrid 2017.
