= Valère Novarina =

Swiss choreographer and photographer (1942–2026)

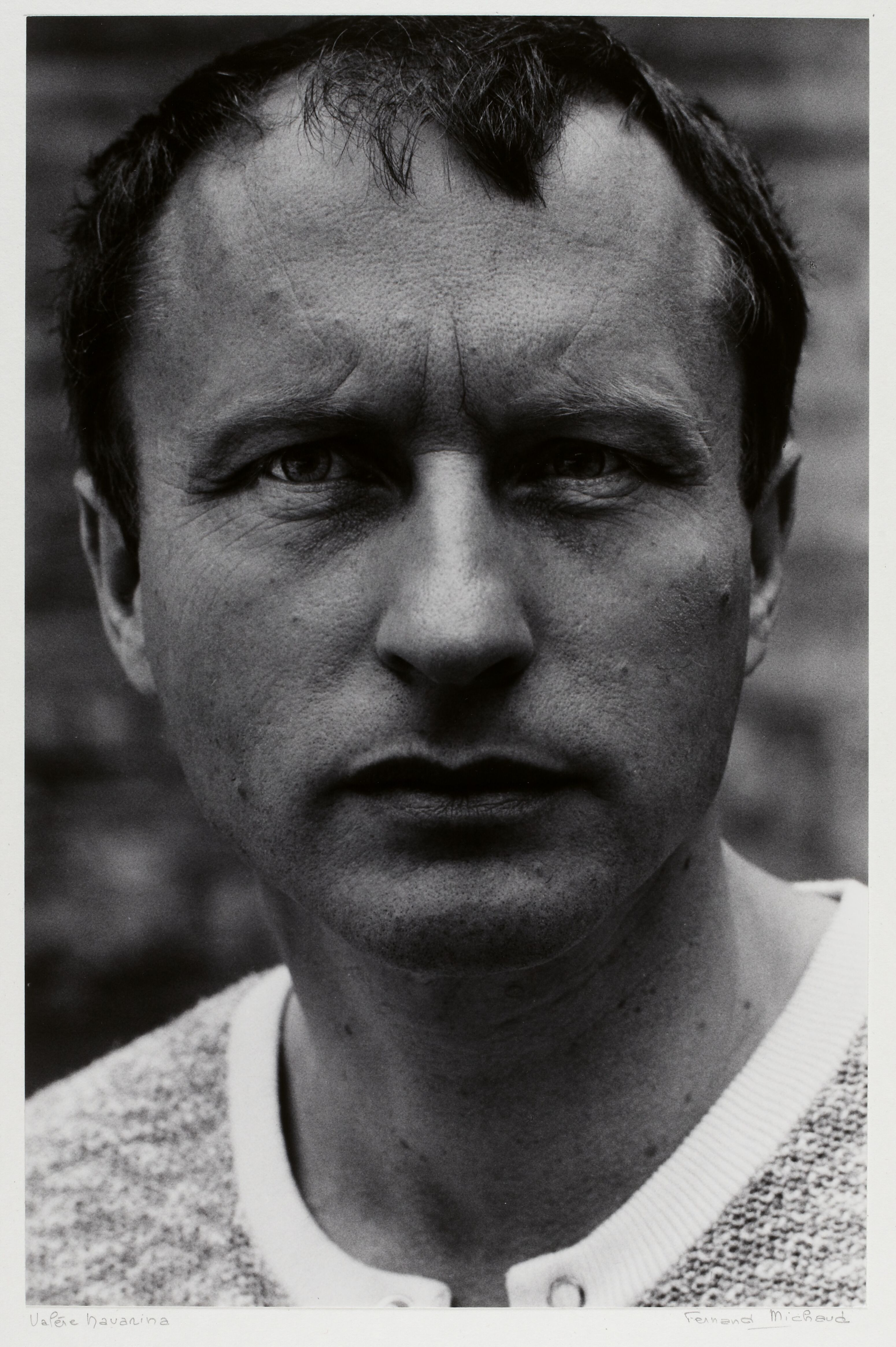
- Novarina in 1986
- Born: 4 May 1942; Chêne-Bougeries, Switzerland
- Died: 16 January 2026 (aged 83); Neuilly-sur-Seine, France
- Education: University of Paris
- Occupations: Choreographer; Photographer

Valère Novarina (4 May 1942 – 16 January 2026) was a Swiss choreographer and photographer.

== Life and career ==
Born in Chêne-Bougeries on 4 May 1942, Novarina was the son of architect Maurice Novarina and stage actress Manon Trolliet. His brother, Patrice, became an architect and plastic artist. He studied philosophy and philology at the University of Paris.

His first piece for the stage was titled L'Atelier volant and it was directed Jean-Pierre Sarrazac. In 1976, he wrote Falstafe, a modern-day adaptation of Henri IV by William Shakespeare, which was directed by Marcel Maréchal at the Théâtre du Gymnase in Marseille. He gained recognition in 1987 for the play Le Discours aux animaux, which was shown at the Festival d'Avignon and featured actor André Marcon. He also directed two radio shows for France Culture, Le Théâtre des oreilles and Les Cymbales de l'homme en bois du limonaire retentissent. He joined the Comédie-Française in 2006. As a longtime regular at the Festival d'Avignon, he had been attending since the first term of Bernard Faivre d'Arcier. In 2007, he opened the Festival dans la cour d'honneur with his play, L'Acte inconnu. In 2015, he presented the play Le Vivier des Noms at the Cloître des Carmes. In 2017, he was a candidate for the Académie Française in a seat left vacant by the death of René Girard, but Michel Zink was elected instead.

Novarina died in Neuilly-sur-Seine on 16 January 2026, at the age of 83.

== Distinctions ==
- Commander of the Ordre des Arts et des Lettres (1995)
- Knight of the Legion of Honour (2001)
  - Officer (2025)
- Prix Jean-Arp de littérature francophone (2011)
- Homage at the Rencontres européennes de littérature (2012)
- Symposium at the Centre culturel international de Cerisy-la-Salle (2018)
