= Jean-Pierre Sarrazac =

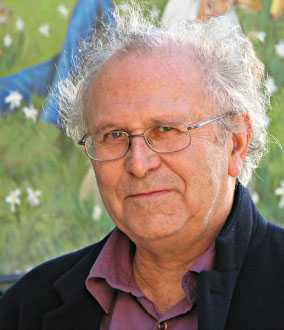
Jean Pierre Sarrazac

Jean-Pierre Sarrazac (French pronunciation: [ʒɑ̃ pjɛʁ saʁazak]; born 1946) is a French playwright, stage director, drama trainer and university teacher. In his works he has been influenced by Bernard Dort. He has published several studies and books on drama and dramaturgy. He directed several plays by playwrights Valère Novarina, Strindberg, von Saaz and himself. Jean-Pierre Sarrazac is an emeritus professor of theatre studies at the University of Paris III: Sorbonne Nouvelle and invited professor at the Université catholique de Louvain (Belgium).

== Works ==
=== Plays ===
- 1976 : Lazare lui aussi rêvait d'eldorado
- 1985 : L'Enfant-roi (The Kid King)
- 1989 : Les Inséparables (The Unbreakables)
- 1989 : La Passion du jardinier (The Gardener's Passion)
- 1993 : Harriet
- 1996 : La Fugitive (The Fugitive)
- 2003 : Cantiga para jà, Place de la Révolution (co-written with Christina Mirjol)

== Essays ==
- 1981 : L'Avenir du drame
- 1989 : Théâtres intimes (Intimate Theatres)
- 1995 : Théâtres du moi, théâtres du monde (Theatres Of Me, Theatres Of The World)
- 2000 : Critique du théâtre. De l'utopie au désenchantement (The Theater Critic, The Disenchantment Utopia)
- 2004 : Jeux de rêves et autres détours
