= Serge Ricard =

French historian

Serge Ricard, a former Fulbright Scholar, is professor of American Civilization at the Sorbonne Nouvelle. Ricard specializes in both American foreign policy and civilization. He is co-director with Pierre Melandri of OPEA, the Center for the Study of American Foreign Policy ("Observatoire de la politique étrangère américaine") at the same university. Ricard also specializes in the foreign policy of 26th US President, Theodore Roosevelt and serves on the international advisory board of the Roosevelt Study Center in the Netherlands. In October, 2007, Ricard was a featured speaker at the Annual Meeting of the Theodore Roosevelt Association in Boston, Massachusetts.
