= Sorbonne Nouvelle University =

University and academic publisher

- Université Sorbonne Nouvelle – Paris 3
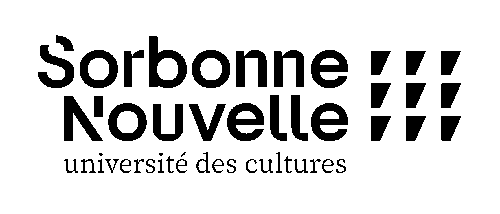
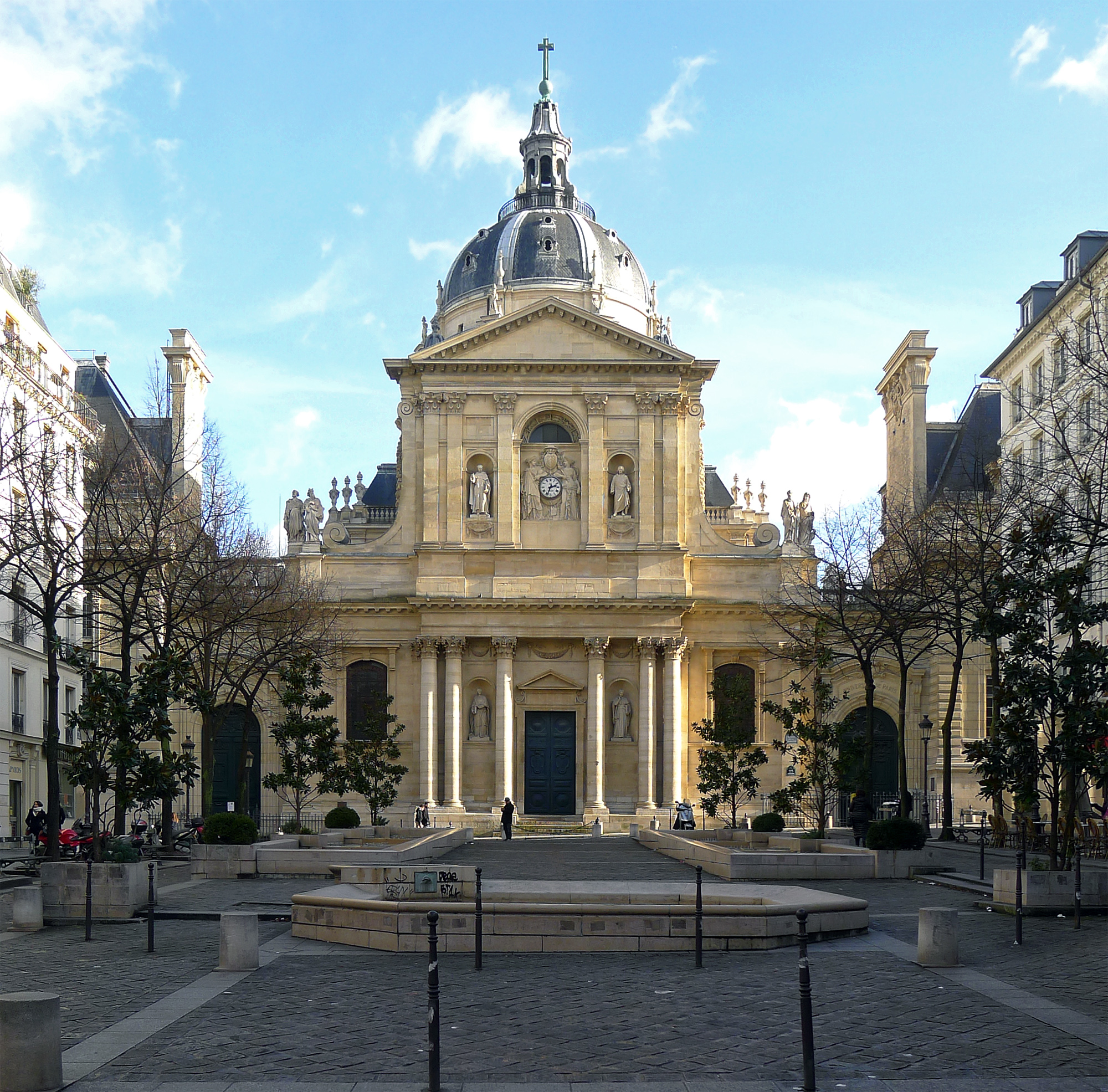
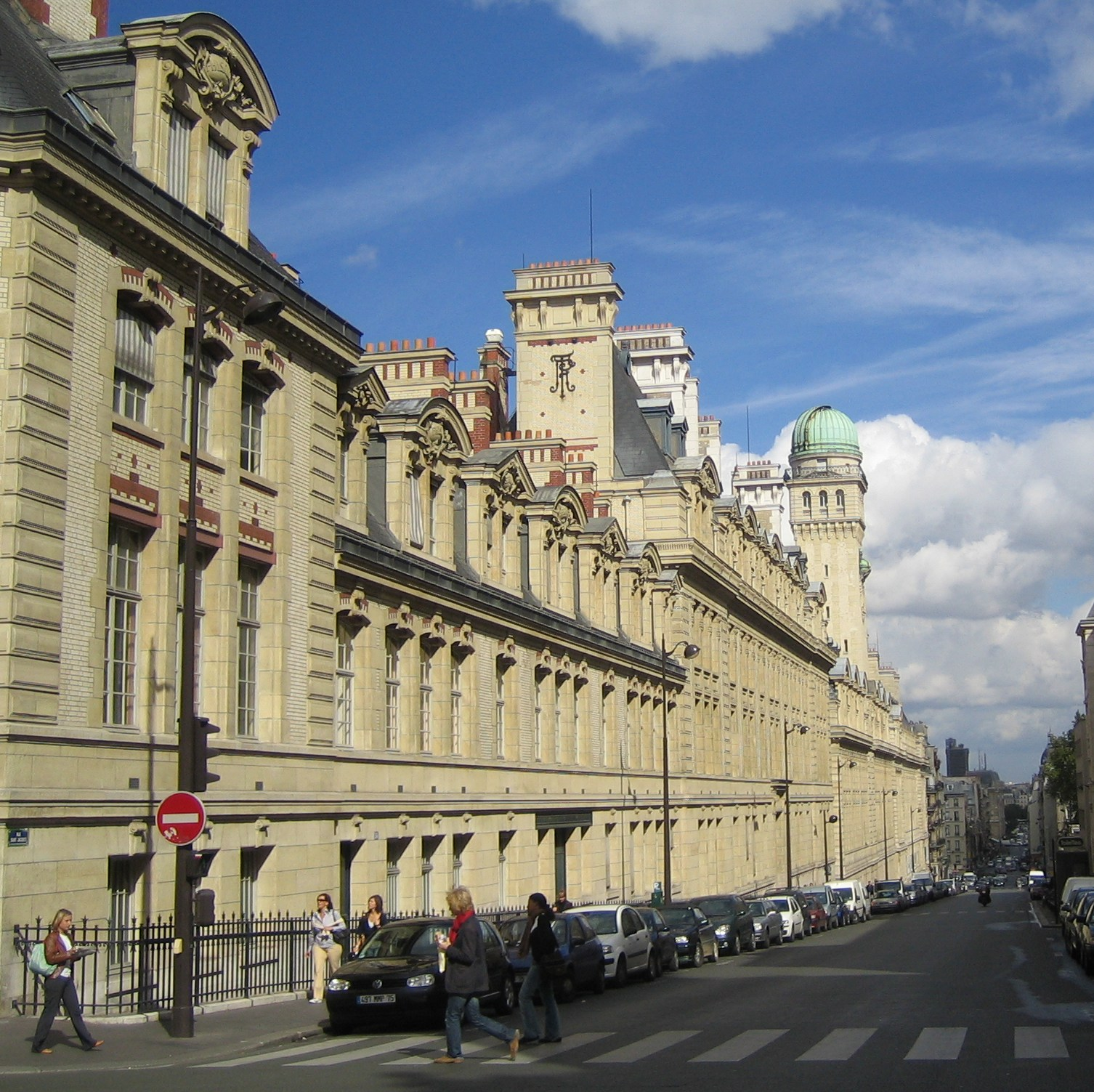
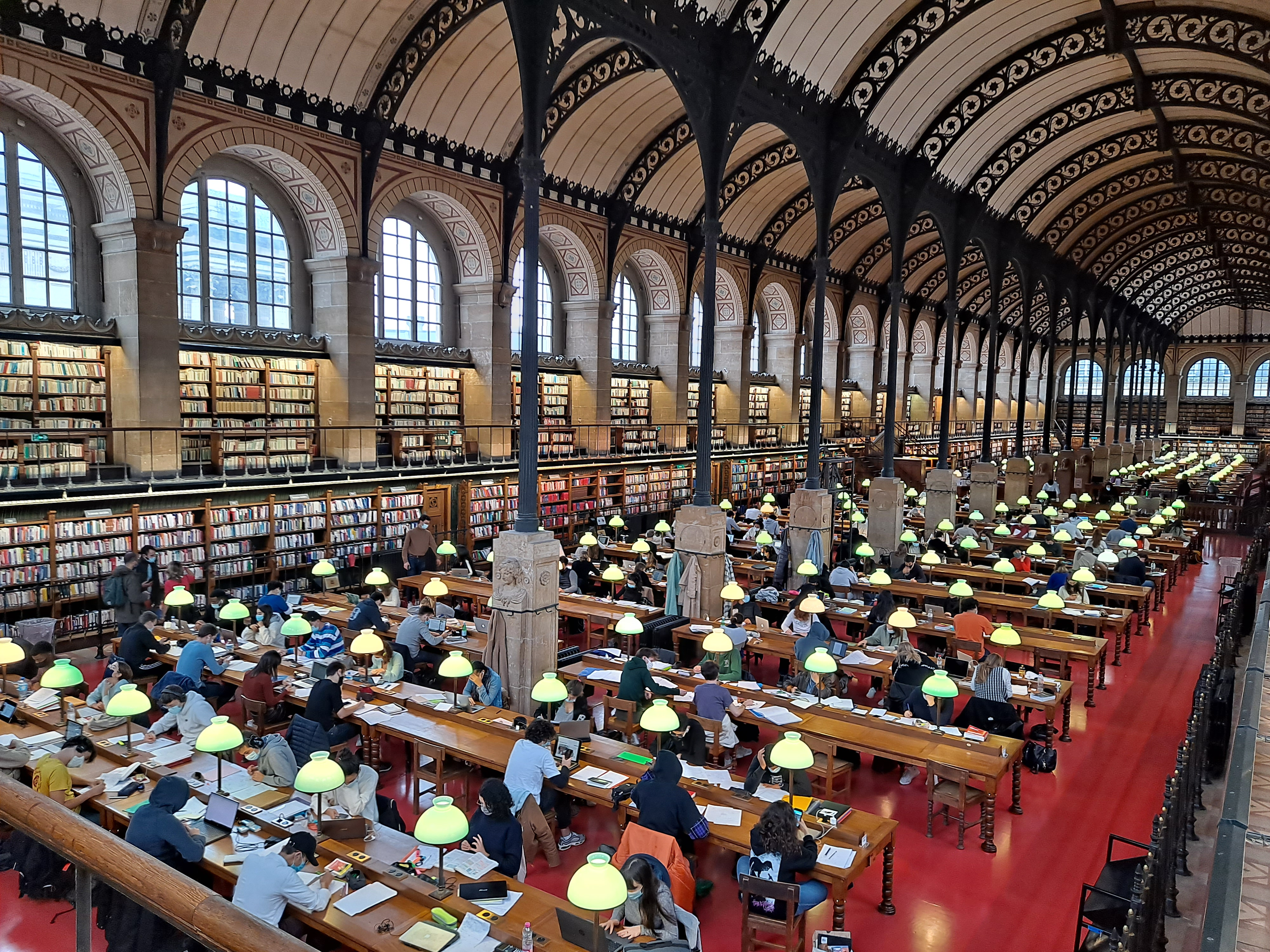
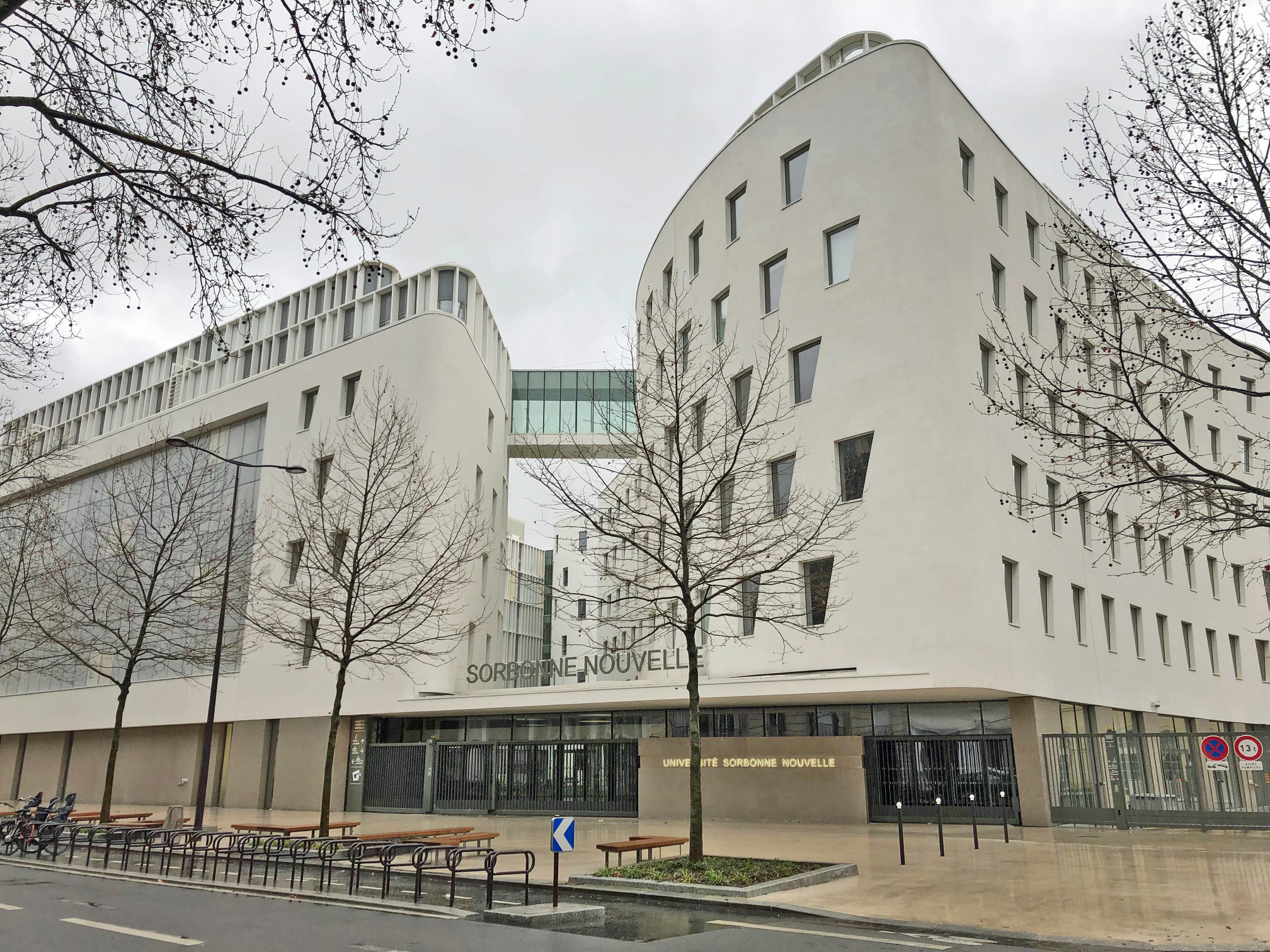
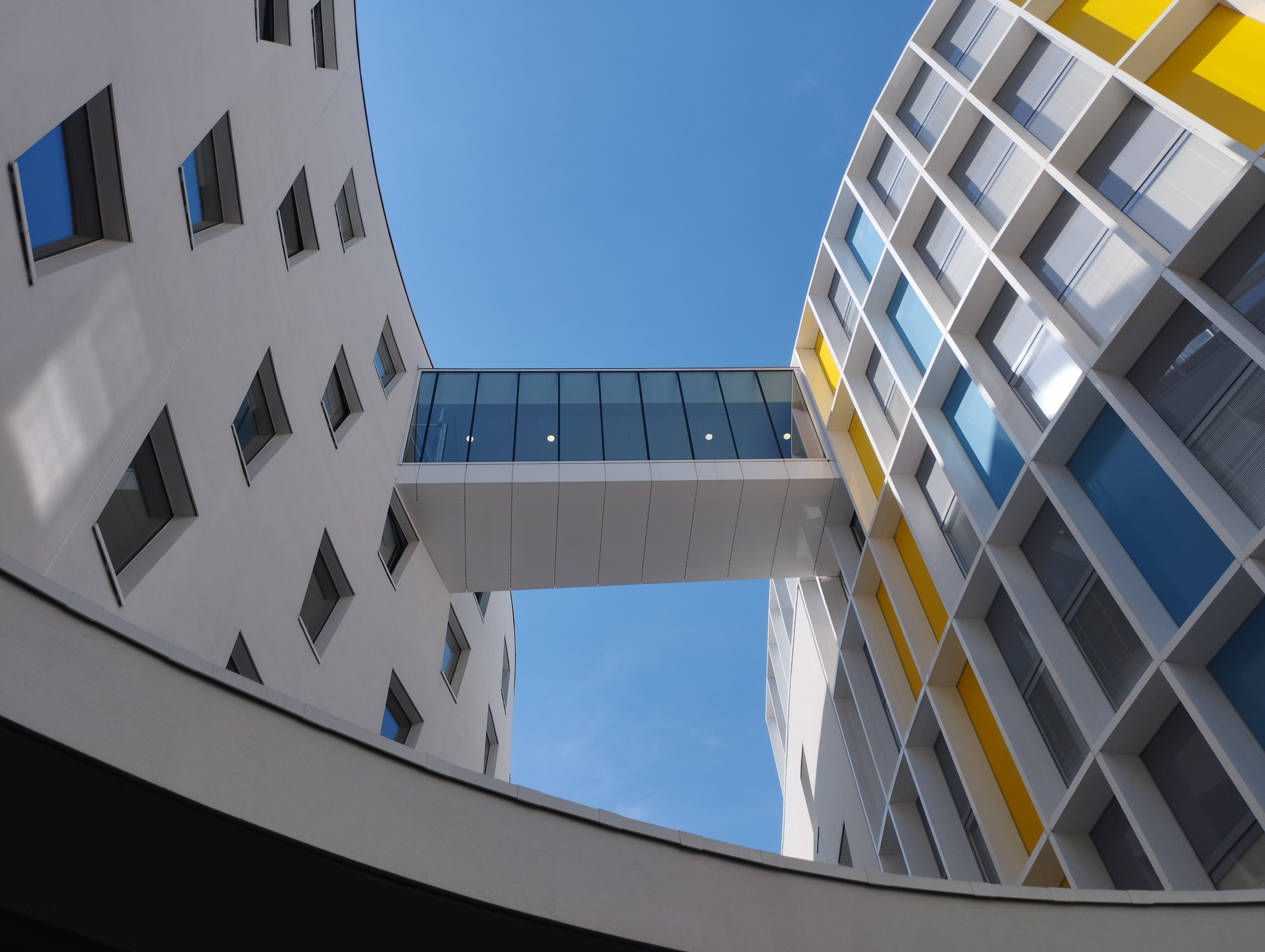
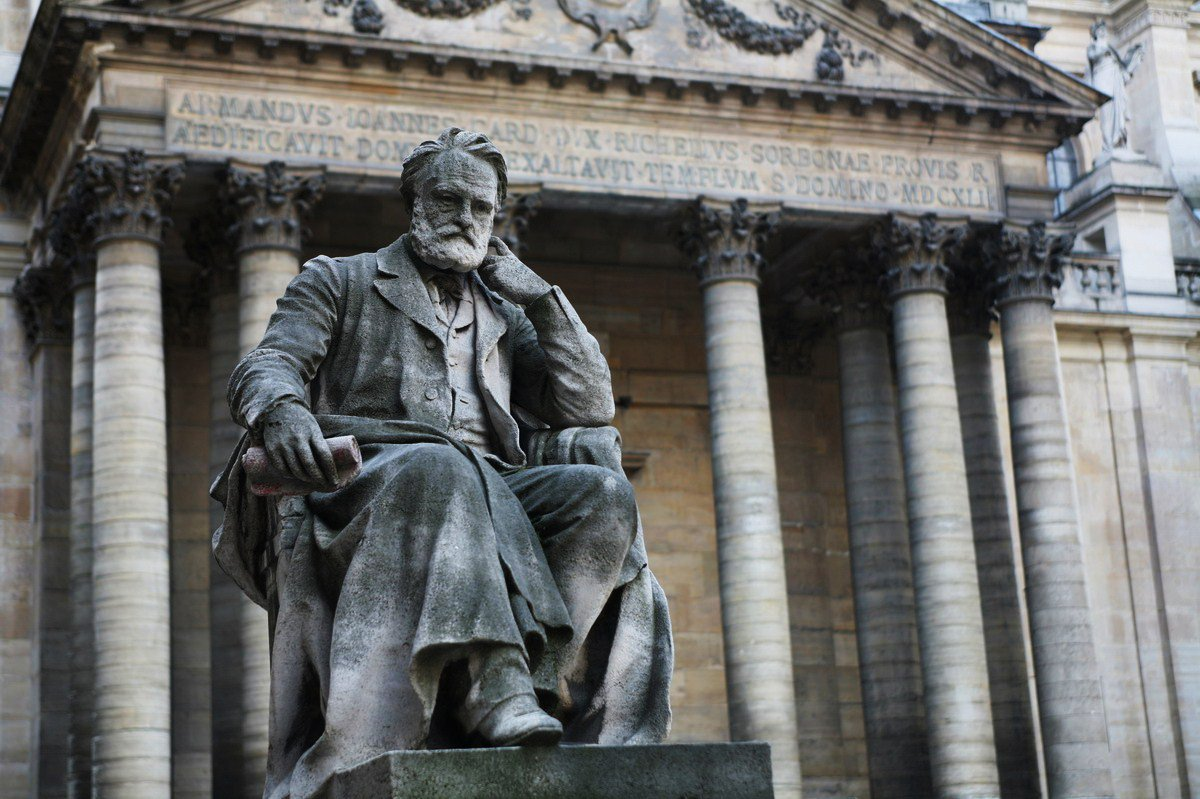
- Motto: L'université des cultures (French)
- Motto in English: The university of cultures
- Type: Public
- Established: 1971; 55 years ago (following the division of the University of Paris, founded: c. 1150)
- Chancellor: François Weil; Chancellor of the Universities of Paris
- President: Daniel Mouchard-Zay
- Students: 19,360
- Undergraduates: 7,572
- Postgraduates: 7,904
- Doctoral students: 3,252
- Location: Paris, France; 48°50′42″N 2°23′49″E
- Website: univ-paris3.fr
- France Paris

Sorbonne Nouvelle University (French: Université Sorbonne Nouvelle, also known as Université Sorbonne Nouvelle – Paris 3, Paris 3, Sorbonne Nouvelle and the Sorbonne) is a public liberal arts and humanities university in Paris, France. It is one of the inheritors of the historic University of Paris, which was completely overhauled and restructured in 1970.

== History ==
The historic University of Paris first appeared in the second half of the 12th century, but was reorganised in 1970 as 13 autonomous universities after the student protests of the French May. Sorbonne Nouvelle, or "Paris III", is one of the inheritors of University of Paris faculty of humanities ("arts et lettres").

== University sites ==
The Sorbonne Nouvelle has sites at various locations in Paris.

=== Main university campuses ===
- Sorbonne Campus – central administration offices, Literature department
  - Sainte-Barbe Library and Sainte-Geneviève Library – Located near the Panthéon in the Latin Quarter, those two research libraries are owned and managed by Sorbonne Nouvelle University.
  - Maison de la Recherche – Located rue des Irlandais in the Latin Quarter, it is the university's main research centre and facility.
- Nation Campus – the main teaching site, named after the arrondissement (since 2022), ESIT (School of Interpreting and Translation).
- Condorcet Campus – Institute for Advanced Latin American Studies (IHEAL)

=== Other locations until 2022 ===
- Censier Campus – located rue Censier, was abandoned in 2022
- Bièvre Campus – houses teaching and research facilities for language study and the main staff and student refectories
- Rue Saint-Jacques – French as a Foreign Language department
- Rue des Bernardins – The Linguistics and Phonetics department
- Rue de l'École-de-Médecine – English Studies department
- Place du Maréchal-de-Lattre-de-Tassigny – Houses the ESIT (School of Interpreting and Translation)
- Asnières – located outside of Paris, where the German Studies department, now closed, was housed.

== University libraries ==
The Sorbonne Nouvelle has one central (the Sorbonne Nouvelle Library, known as 'BSN') and five specialised libraries (Foreign language and culture and French literature). It is also connected to the Sainte-Geneviève Library, the Sorbonne Library, the Inter-University Library for Oriental Languages and the Sainte-Barbe Library.

== University press ==
The Presses Sorbonne Nouvelle publishes research carried out by the university.

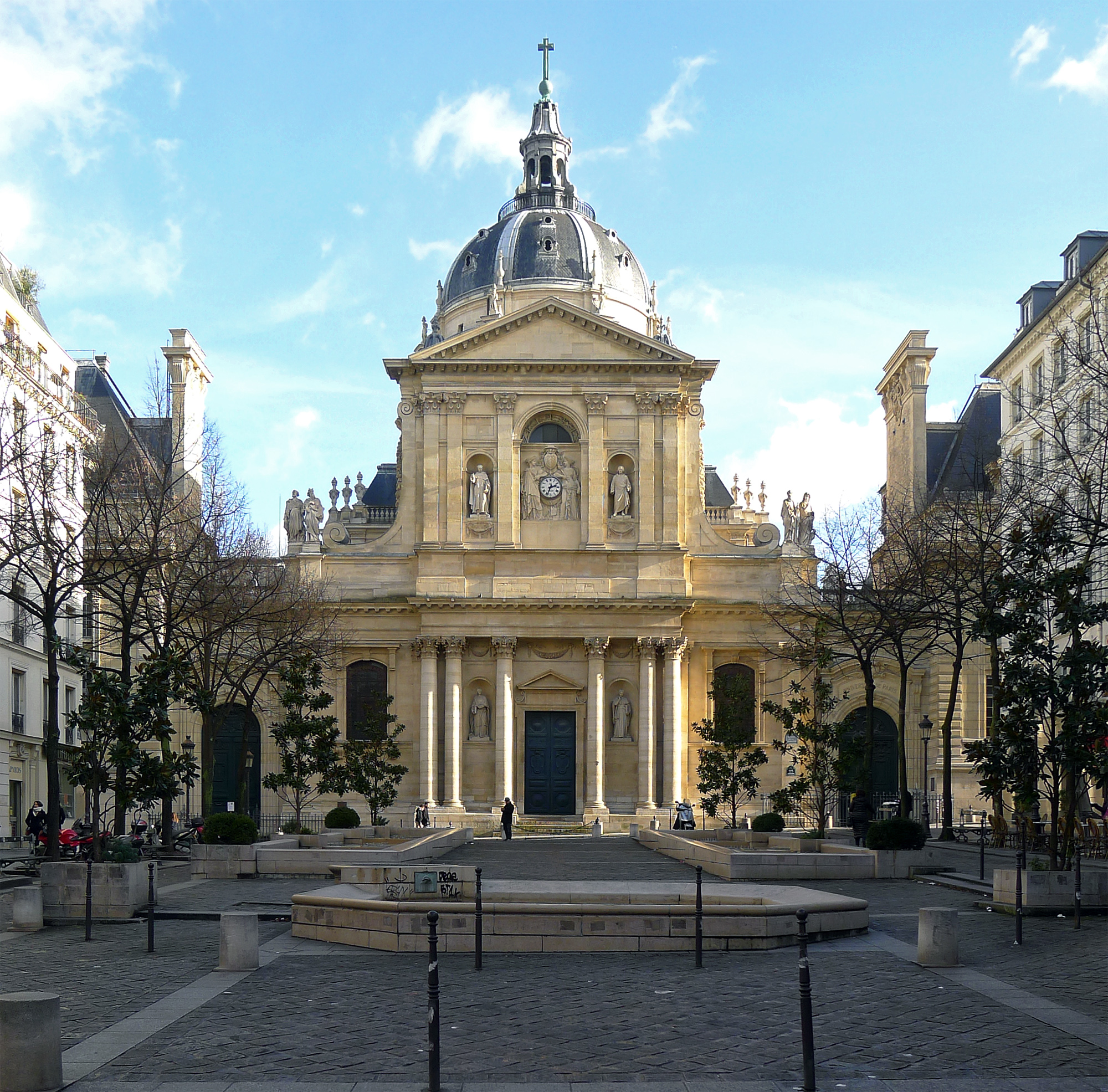
Chapel of the main Sorbonne building

== Accommodation and refectories ==
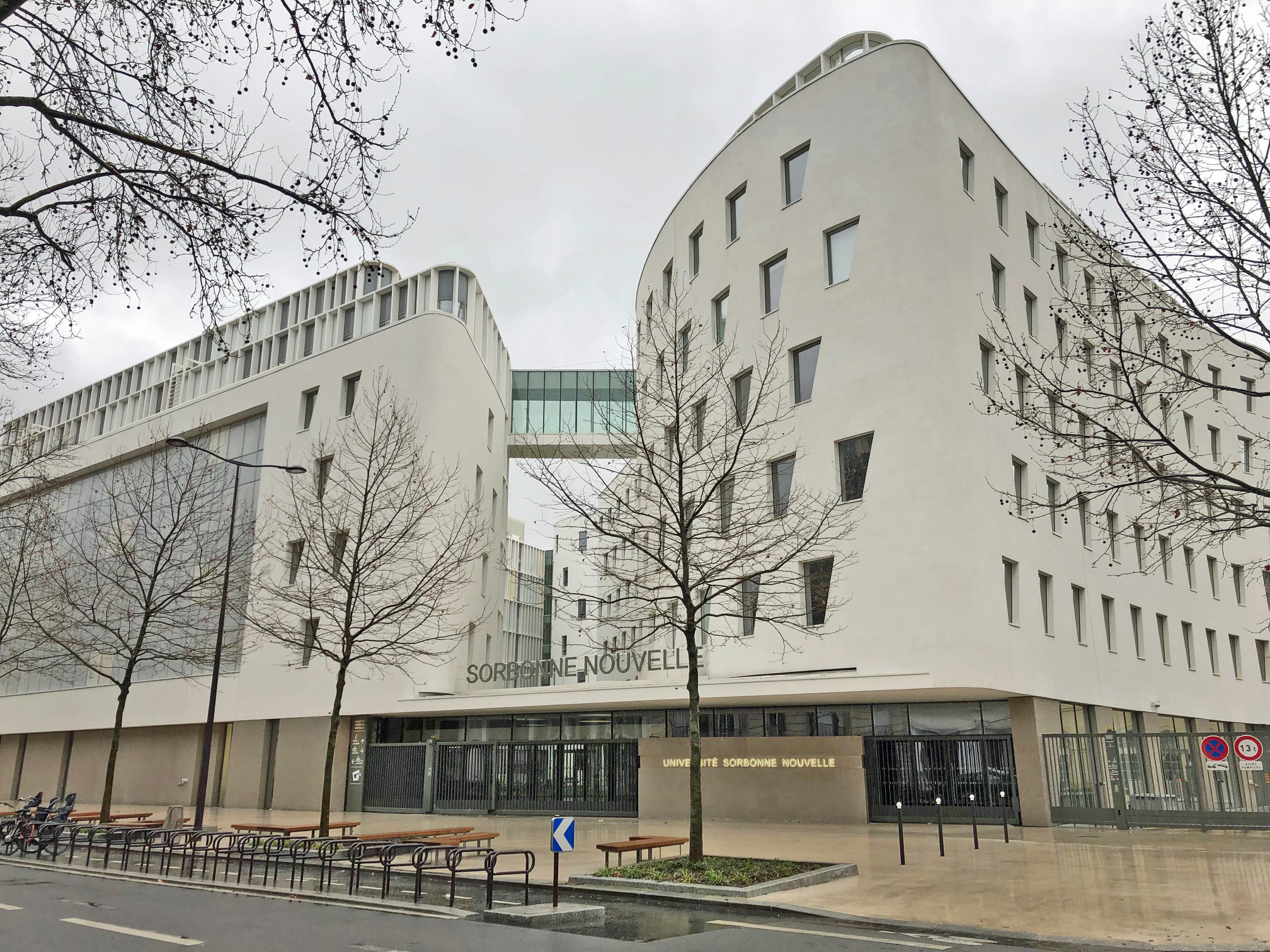
Entrance of the main building of Sorbonne Nouvelle University, built in by Christian de Portzamparc, Nation Campus, Paris

The Crous de Paris (Centre régional des œuvres universitaires et scolaires) is the organisation responsible for both student accommodation and refectories in Paris. It runs various student halls of residence and student restaurants both in central Paris and in its outskirts.

== Sorbonne Paris Cité Alliance ==
Sorbonne Nouvelle University tried to become a member of Sorbonne Paris Cité Alliance, which groups together several Parisian universities. Due to opposition from students and professors, the project did not succeed.

== QS World University Rankings ==
In 2023, the QS World University Rankings ranked Sorbonne Nouvelle University as follows:

- Linguistics: 96 (3rd in France)
- Modern Languages: 151-200 (5th in France)
- English language and literature: 151-200 (3rd in France)
- Arts and Humanities: 215 (6th in France)

This ranking includes both universities and public and private educational institutions without distinction.

== Notable alumni ==
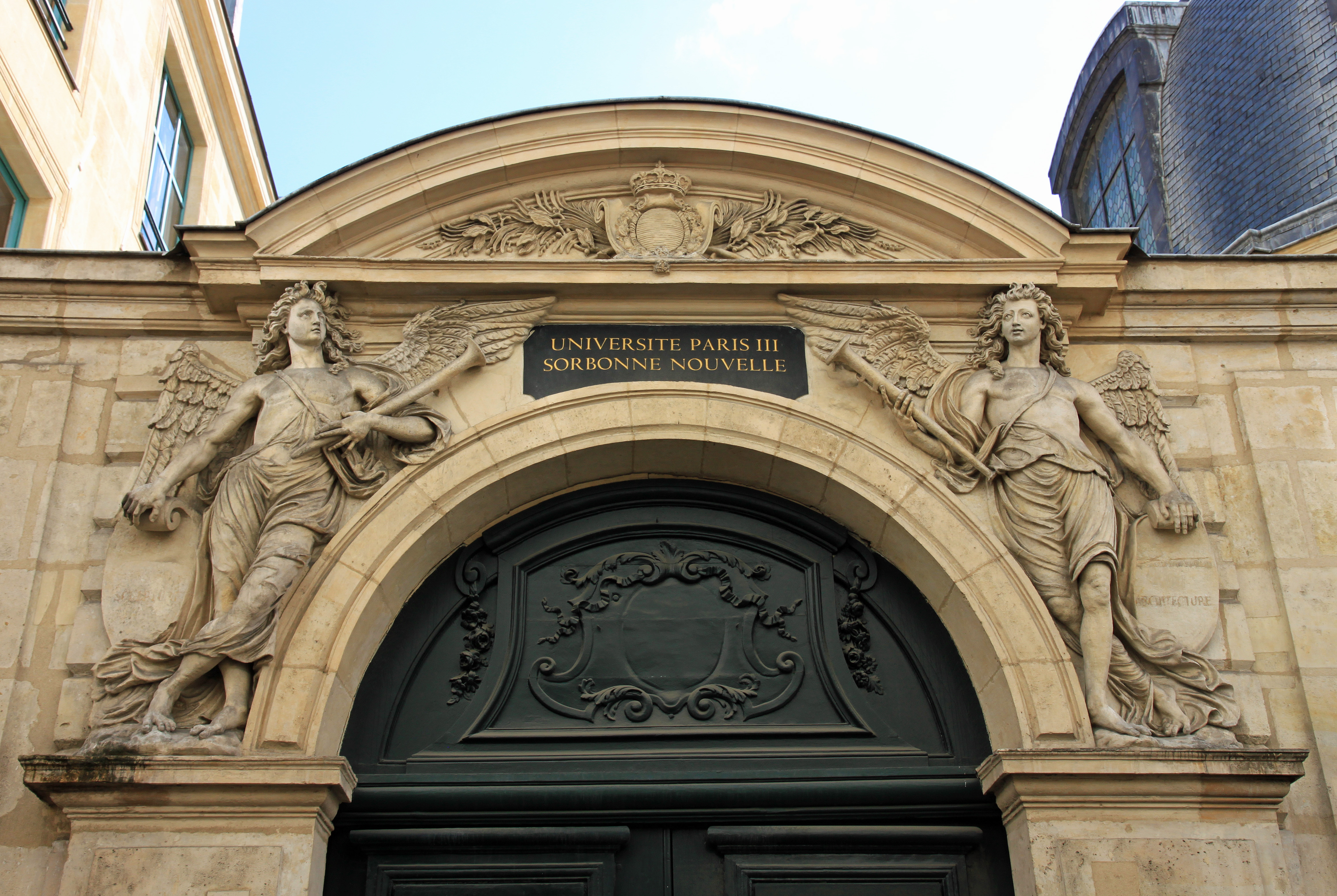
- Entrance of one of the buildings of Sorbonne Nouvelle University, 5 rue de l'École-de-Médecine, Paris. Formerly buildings for the royal school of drawing under Louis XV
  Alan García – President of Peru
- Olivier Assayas – French film director and screenwriter
- Jacques Aumont – Film Professor
- Latifa Ben Mansour – Algerian writer and linguist
- Alain Bergala – French film director
- Jean Bessière – Academic and writer
- Frédéric Bozo – Academic
- Bruno della Chiesa – Linguist
- Arnaud Desplechin – French film director
- Mike Downey, Film producer
- Cédric Klapisch – French Film Director (L'Auberge Espagnole, Les poupées russes, Paris)
- Bernard-Pierre Donnadieu – French actor
- Olivier Ducastel – French film director
- Mireille Guiliano – French-American author
- René Gutman: Ph.D., a former philosophy student, Rabbi of Strasbourg
- Martine L. Jacquot – writer, journalist
- Miro Kovač – Croatian Foreign Minister
- Dalit Lahav-Durst – Brazilian art historian
- Laila Marrakchi – French film director
- Predrag Matvejevic – Writer and academic
- Sigurður Pálsson – Icelandic author
- Pedro Paulet – Peruvian scientist
- Homa Sayar – Iranian Poet
- Jean-Pierre Thiollet – French author
- Patricia de Souza – Peruvian writer
- Maryse Condé – French (Guadeloupean) novelist

== Professors and former professors ==
- Henri Adamczewski
- Jacques Aumont
- Louis Bazin
- Raymond Bellour
- Alain Bergala
- Jean Bessière
- Pascal Bonitzer
- Frédéric Bozo
- Linda Cardinal
- Michel Chion
- Serge Daney
- Latifa Ben Mansour
- Michel Marie
- Stéphane Michaud
- Luc Moullet
- Annie Ousset-Krief
- Maria Isaura Pereira de Queiróz
- Josette Rey-Debove
- Jean-Pierre Sarrazac
- Danica Seleskovitch

== See also ==
- Education in France
- University of Paris
- Sorbonne (disambiguation)
