= Jean Bessière =

French academic

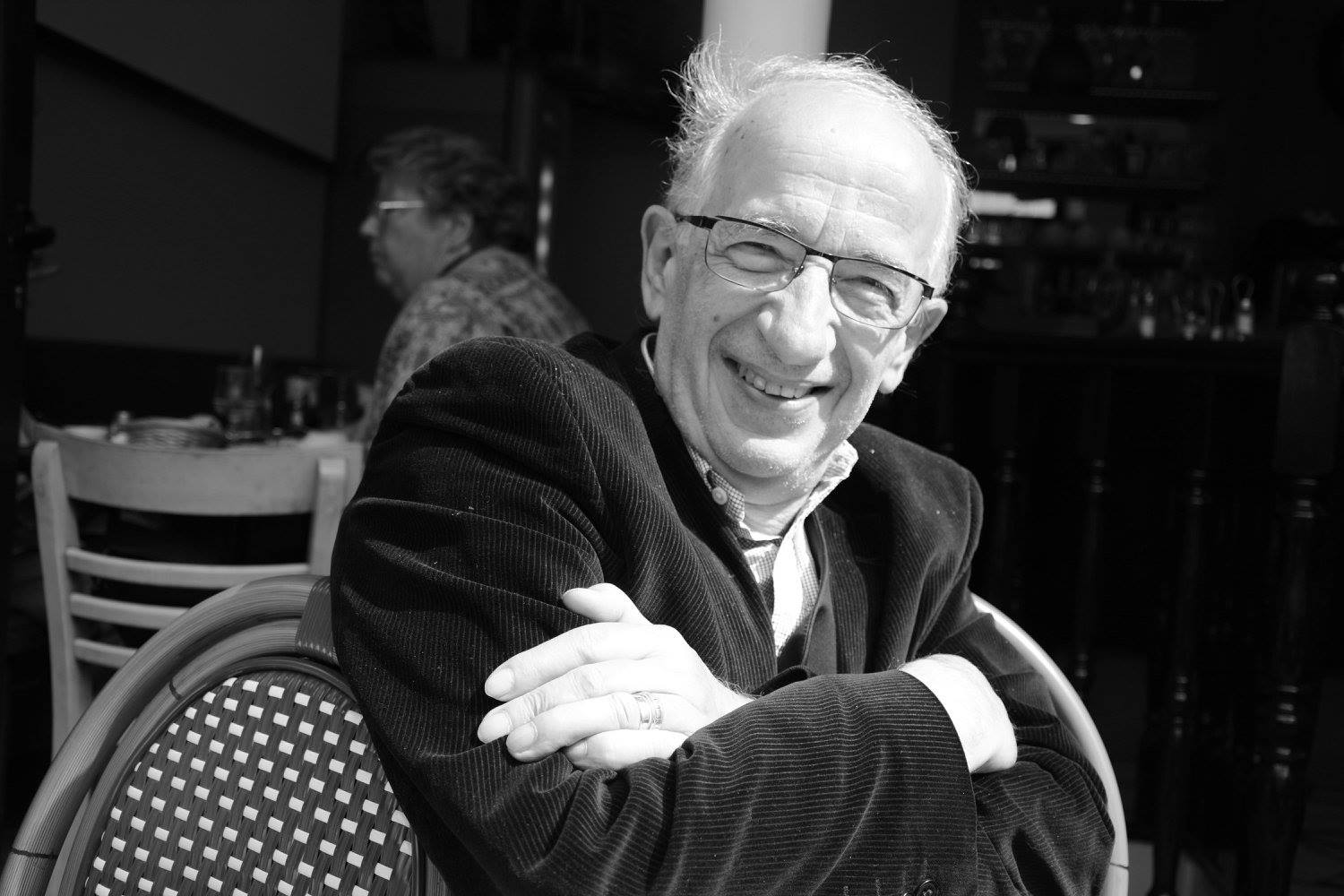

Jean Bessière is professor of Comparative Literature at the Sorbonne (University of Paris III: Sorbonne Nouvelle), and was educated at the École Normale Supérieure and holds a PhD (docteur d'Etat) from the Sorbonne as well as being agrégé in Modern Letters. He is the author of numerous books on Comparative Literature and is the president emeritus of the International Comparative Literature Association. His most recent works include La littérature et sa rhétorique (PUF, 1999), Quel statut pour la littérature ? (PUF, 2001), Principes de la theorie littéraire (PUF, 2005) and Le roman contemporain ou la problématicité du monde (PUF 2010). Jean Bessière has been on the faculty of numerous universities including Indiana University, Stanford, McGill and several French universities. In 2008 the Canadian Review of Comparative Literature dedicated an entire issue to him entitled: "Jean Bessière - Literature and Comparative Literature Revisited." Jean Bessière frequently lectures at universities throughout the world.
