= Stéphane Michaud =

French scholar specializing in comparative literature

- Citizenship: France
- Education: Sorbonne
- Occupation: Professor
- Writing career
- Language: French
- Period: 1980–present
- Subject: comparative literature
- Notable works: Lou Andreas-Salomé, l'alliée de la vie (2000); Freud en correspondance (2007); Quatre poètes dans l'Europe monde (2009)

Stéphane Michaud (born 1944) is a French scholar specializing in comparative literature. He is Professor Emeritus of the Sorbonne Nouvelle in Paris where he taught since the 1990s. He has written or edited more than ten books, a body of work that is influential in his field.

== Biography ==
Michaud taught at the Universities of Dijon, Neuchâtel and Saint-Etienne before joining the Sorbonne Nouvelle in the 1990s. He was secretary general, then president, of the Société des études romantiques et dix-neuviémistes, a learned society for the study of romanticism and 19th century literature. He was a member of the Executive Committee of the International Comparative Literature Association. He headed the publishing house of the Sorbonne Nouvelle, Presses Sorbonne Nouvelle. He was the head of the Department of French and Comparative Literature at the Sorbonne Nouvelle for several years. He collaborates on a number of academic publications, including La Quinzaine littéraire, Critique, and Romantisme.

=== Ties to Germany ===
Against a background of improving relationships between Germany and France in the post-war years, Stéphane Michaud spent one year in Germany in his childhood, as a means to study a foreign language and to become familiar with a foreign culture. This initiated a lifelong connection to Germany. After reading classical languages at the Sorbonne, Michaud worked in Germany as a language assistant at Heidelberg University. He published extensively about German authors of the 19th and 20th century, editing unpublished works such as Lou Andreas-Salomé's journal of her journey in Russia with Rainer Maria Rilke, Rußland mit Rainer. He published French translations of works by the contemporary German poet Wulf Kirsten.

Michaud was an invited professor at various German institutions including Humboldt University of Berlin. He is a member of the Collegium Europaeum Jenense (CEJ) of the Friedrich-Schiller University (Jena, Germany).

=== Major research topics: romanticism, socialism and feminism ===
Leading strands in his work are his focus on romanticism, his concern with social history, the socialist movements of the 19th century, and feminism. He is a leading expert on the socialist writer and activist Flora Tristan, and on women writers such as Lou Andreas-Salomé.

== Main publications ==
- Lettres de Flora Tristan. Paris, Le Seuil, 1980. Reviewed by Jean Gaulmier.
- Muse et Madone. Visages de la femme de la Révolution française aux apparitions de Lourdes (Paris: Éditions du Seuil, 1985). Reviewed by Max Milner.
- L'Impossible semblable. Regards sur trois siecles de relations littéraires franco-allemandes. Paris, SEDES, 1991. Reviewed by Michel Trebitsch.
- L'Édification. Morales et cultures au XIXe siècle, Édition Créaphis, 1993. Reviewed by Denis Pernod.
- Flora Tristan, La paria et son rêve. Correspondance établie par Stéphane Michaud. E.N.S. Éditions Fontenay/Saint-Cloud, 1995, 302 p. Reviewed by Martine Reid.
- Lou Andreas-Salomé, l'alliée de la vie (Seuil, 2000) (a biography of Lou Andreas-Salomé). Reviewed by F. Rochefort. A review/discussion of the book was broadcast by France Culture.
- De Flora Tristan à Mario Vargas Llosa (Presses Sorbonne Nouvelle, 2004)
- Freud en correspondance (Presses Sorbonne Nouvelle, 2007)
- Quatre poètes dans l'Europe monde: Yves Bonnefoy, Michel Deguy, Marton Kalasz, Wulf Kirsten (Klincksieck, 2009)
- Wulf Kirsten, Graviers (translation), Belin, coll. "L'extrême contemporain", 2009 (translation of works by the German poet Wulf Kirsten)
- fr:Max Milner, les leçons de l'ombre (Presses Sorbonne Nouvelle, 2011). Short review:
