= Frédéric Bozo =

History professor

- Born: 25 January 1963 (age 63); France
- Education: École Normale Supérieure; Sciences Po; Harvard University
- Occupation: Historian

Frédéric Bozo (born 25 January 1963) is a professor at the University of Paris III: Sorbonne Nouvelle, where he teaches contemporary history and international relations. He is also a Senior Research Associate at the Institut français des relations internationales (IFRI) where his focus is on Atlantic and European security issues.

His prior teaching positions include Sciences Po (1989–1992), the Paris Nanterre University (1992–1994) and the University of Paris-Est Marne-la-Vallée (1994–1998). He is also a member of the Centre de recherche sur l’histoire du monde Atlantique (CRHMA/ Research Center on the History of the Atlantic World, University of Nantes) and of the Groupe français pour l’histoire de l’arme nucléaire (GREFHAN, the French branch of the Nuclear History Programme).

Bozo received his PhD in contemporary history from the University of Paris X-Nanterre (1993) and his Habilitation from the University of Paris III (1997). An alumnus of the École Normale Supérieure and Sciences Po, he holds an Agrégation in history; he has also studied at Harvard University and speaks English fluently.

== Publications, monographs and articles in English ==
- French Foreign Policy since 1945: An Introduction
- Mitterrand, the End of the Cold War, and German Unification (New York: Berghahn Books, 2009)
- Should Nato Play a More Political Role? A debate between Frédéric Bozo and Espen Barth Eide, Director of the International Politics Department at the Norwegian Institute of International Affairs (NUPI), Oslo. Nato Review, n.1, Spring 2005.
- Gulliver Unbound: America's Imperial Temptation and the War in Iraq with Stanley Hoffmann, Rowman and Littlefield Lanham, Washington, 2004.
- " 'The French Difference': An Exchange" exchange with Tony Judt in The New York Review of Books, 07/05/2001.
- Two Strategies for Europe : De Gaulle, the United States and the Atlantic Alliance, Rowman & Littlefield Publishers, Washington, 2000.
- Where Does the Atlantic Alliance Stand? The Improbable Partnership, Notes de l'IFRI n.6 bis, 1999
- "France" in Michael Brenner (dir.), NATO and Collective Security after the Cold War, London, Macmillan, 1998
- Détente versus Alliance : France, the United States and the Politics of the Harmel Report (1964–1968), Contemporary European History, 7, 3, 1998

== Publications in French ==
- Mitterrand, la fin de la guerre froide et l’unification allemande, De Yalta à Maastricht, Odile Jacob, Paris, 2005
- Relations internationales et stratégie de la guerre froide à la guerre contre le terrorisme (collectif), Rennes University Presses, Rennes, 2005.
- États-Unis – Europe: réinventer l'Alliance, with Jacques Beltran (dir.) Travaux et recherches de l'Ifri, Paris, 2001.
- La France et l'alliance atlantique depuis la fin de la guerre froide - Le modèle gaullien en question (1989–1999) Monograph of the French Ministry of Defence center for History studies (CEHD) n.17, Paris, 2001. Download as a PDF
- La Politique étrangère de la France depuis 1945, La Découverte, Paris, 1997
- La France et l'OTAN, 1949-1996, with Maurice Vaïsse and Pierre Mélandri (dir.), Complexe, Bruxelles, 1996
- La France et l'OTAN. De la guerre froide au nouvel ordre européen, Masson, Paris, 1991
