= Raymond Bellour =

French scholar, film critic and writer

- Born: 1939 (age 86–87); Lyon, France
- Education: Paris 1 Panthéon-Sorbonne University (DrE, 1979)
- Occupations: Scholar, film critic, writer
- Employer: CNRS

Raymond Bellour (born 1939) is a French scholar, film critic and writer.

Best known to Anglophone readers for his publications on film analysis, his work is dispersed across a wide range of articles and books, few of which are available in English, in which he addresses a broad spectrum of topics in the areas of cinema, literature and moving-image art. He is currently Director of Research, Emeritus, at the CNRS, the Centre national de la recherche scientifique, which he entered in 1964. In the course of his career he has taught at the Université de Paris I, at IDHEC (now "la Fémis"), the Université de Paris III, the Centre américain d'études cinématographiques, later renamed the Centre parisien d'études critiques, and in a range of international institutions as a guest lecturer. In 1990 with Christine Van Assche and Catherine David he co-curated the Passages de l'image exhibition at the Centre Georges Pompidou. He helped found the journal Trafic in 1991, with Serge Daney, and Jean-Claude Biette,

== Works ==
- Le Livre des autres: entretiens avec M. Foucault, C. Lévi-Strauss, R. Barthes, P. Francastel ..., L’Herne, 1971
- 'Segmenting/Analysing', Quarterly Review of Film Studies, Vol. 1, No. 3, August 1976, pp. 331–353
- L'Analyse du film, 1979. Translated as The Analysis of Film
- 'Psychosis, Neurosis, Perversion', Camera Obscura, nos 3–4, 1979, pp. 104–34. Reprinted in Marshall Deutelbaum, Leland A. Poague, eds., A Hitchcock Reader, 2nd ed., Wiley-Blackwell, 2009, pp. 341 ff.
- Henri Michaux, 1986
- Mademoiselle Guillotine, 1989
- Eye for I: Video Self-Portraits, New York: Independent Curators Inc., 1989
- L'Entre-Images: Photo, Cinéma, Vidéo, 1990
- Jean-Luc Godard: Son + Image 1974-1991, 1992
- Oubli, 1992
- L'Entre-Images 2, 1999
- Partages de l'ombre, 2002
- Le Corps du cinéma, 2009
- La Querelle des dispositifs: Cinéma - installations, expositions, 2012
- L'Enfant, 2013
- Pensées du cinéma, 2016
