= Teresa Stanisławska-Adamczewska =

Polish journalist (1924–2003)

- Born: 26 September 1924; Wielkopolska
- Died: 16 December 2003 (aged 79); Kraków
- Occupations: journalist and writer, editor-in-chief

Teresa Stanisławska-Adamczewska (26 September 1924 – 16 December 2003 in Kraków) was a Polish journalist, writer, and editor-in-chief of Echo Krakowa.

== Early life ==
She was born Teresa Stanisławska in Greater Poland and spent her professional life in Kraków.

== Career ==
From 1955 till 1982 she was editor-in-chief of Echo Krakowa, a daily newspaper that became the most popular newspaper in Kraków under her.

She published many articles on the city's cultural life, especially about Piwnica pod Baranami. She was a mentor for many Polish journalists, like Zbigniew Święch, Ewa Smęder, Jadwiga Rubiś, and Andrzej Urbańczyk.

In 1989, Stanisławska-Adamczewska and Edward Chudziński created the anthology Cudzym zdaniem: poglądy, refleksje, aforyzmy, illustrated by Szymon Kobyliński.

She co-authored Kraków, ulica imienia..., (with her husband, Jan Adamczewski) which contains the biograms of the namesakers of the streets in Kraków. The book was printed in 2000, 2015 and 2016.

She was buried among other notable personalities in the Rakowicki Cemetery.
