= Henri Adamczewski =

French linguist (1929–2005)

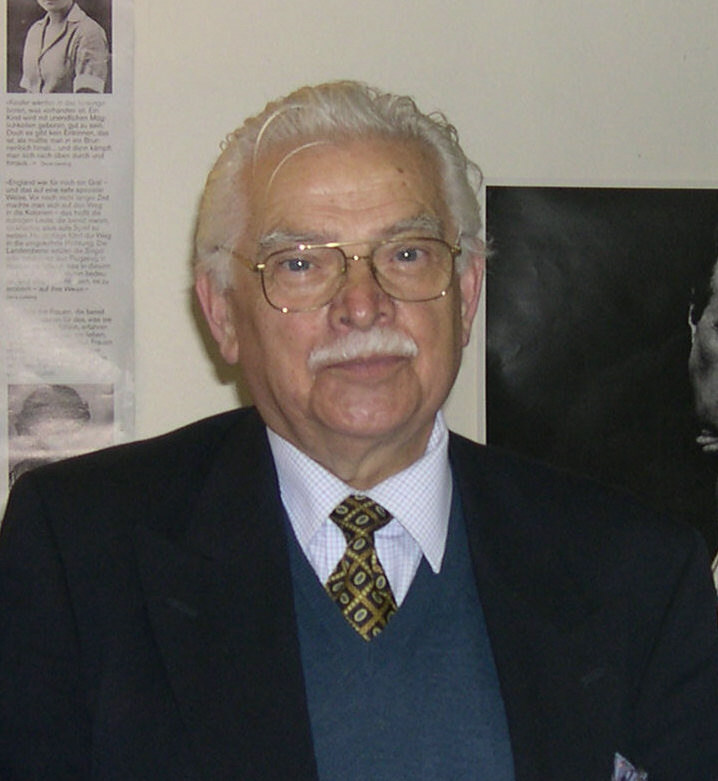
- Born: January 12, 1929
- Died: December 25, 2005 (aged 76)
- Occupation: Linguist

Henri Adamczewski (January 12, 1929 – December 25, 2005) was a French linguist of Polish origin. He is the founder of the Metaoperational Theory, also called "The Theory of Phases", which he taught at University of Paris III: Sorbonne Nouvelle.

== Biography ==
The son of Polish immigrants, Henri Adamczewski was born in a coal-mining area of the North of France where he stayed until the age of 18. It was to this multilingual environment (Polish, Picard, French, Russian, German, Ukrainian and Italian) that he owed his passion for languages.

He was a bright pupil and was offered a grant to continue his secondary studies a few kilometers away from his parents’ home. In 1943, in the midst of war, he had to leave school to learn a trade. He worked as a commis chef and an apprentice baker but continued attending evening classes. In 1944, he went back to school and obtained his baccalaureate in 1947.

A lover of languages, he learned Latin and discovered Indo-European, which was a complete revelation to him. After his baccalaureate, he went to Paris and attended the Sorbonne to prepare a bachelor's degree in English.

He became an English teacher and settled down in Boulogne-Sur-Mer, after marrying to his childhood friend Hélène.

As a deferred conscript, he was assigned to the naval academy in Brest, Brittany, as Cadet Assistant Teacher of English, before returning to Boulogne-sur-Mer in 1957. There he created and ran a language laboratory, which gave him the opportunity to imagine a new pedagogical approach.

He was then elected Assistant Professor in English at Lille University where he taught phonetics. He was elected President of the regional branch of the APLV (Association des Professeurs de Langues Vivantes) in Lille and organized conferences on language learning and applied linguistics.

Once appointed Senior Lecturer in English at the English Institute of Sorbonne Nouvelle University in 1970, he refined his conception of English grammar and in particular his theory on BE + ING, in opposition to the concept of the "progressive form", which was a universally accepted tenet of English grammar in France and across the Channel until then.

Driven by the enthusiasm met by his theory, he wrote and defended his Ph.D. thesis on February 28, 1976, under the supervision of Antoine Culioli, provoking a veritable paradigm shift in the world of French linguists.

In 1983, he wrote, with his colleague Claude Delmas, the book Grammaire Linguistique de l’Anglais, which was to educate hundreds of future English teachers to whom this seminal work offered a critical view of the linguistic theories of the time.

The English Institute of Sorbonne Nouvelle University became an incubator of those who came to be known as metaoperational linguists, who would gather around Henri Adamczewski during the encounters of CRELINGUA. The enthusiasm generated in this way attracted post-graduates from all over the world, and Ph.D. theses, which applied the theory of metaoperational linguistics to languages such as German, Arab, Wolof, Ibibio, Bawule, Malagasy and Senufo, among others, were defended.

In 1984, he was appointed Director of the English Institute of Sorbonne Nouvelle University and placed linguistics at the center of the education of the future English teachers. For four years, he developed and made his theory known to specialists in linguistics but also to the general public.

His desire to make his theory on language accessible to everyone manifested itself in his book Le Français Déchiffré, Clé du Langage et des Langues, which was published in 1991. In addition to revolutionizing the conception and the discourse of French grammar, Henri Adamczewski proposed an introduction to other languages, highlighting their common points.

Already ill but impelled by the fervor of his readers and the devotion of his students, he continued to write. The publication of Les Clefs de la Grammaire anglaise in 1993 and of Déchiffrer la Grammaire anglaise in 1998, with his former student and colleague Jean-Pierre Gabilan, attested his eagerness to pass on his theory to secondary education.

In 1995, he released Caroline Grammairienne en Herbe, a book written from the recordings and writings of his granddaughter in which he laid down the foundations of his theory of language (The Principle of Cyclicity), which challenges Chomsky’s theory of Universal Grammar (UG).

Once retired and appointed Professor Emeritus, he continued to supervise his Ph.D. students. An untiring linguist and polyglot, he started learning Swahili and Turkish. Les Clefs pour Babel, which was released in 1999, gave him the opportunity to go back on his theory and tell his progress as a teacher and as a linguist.

He died on December 25, 2005.

Today, his theory is supported and enriched by some of his students who have become University Lecturers or Professors in France and abroad. It still intellectually influences the teachers of English, in French secondary and grammar schools, who attended Sorbonne Nouvelle University.

== The Metaoperational Theory ==
The Metaoperational Theory is an utterer-centered approach to language and languages whose theoretical framework presents some similarities with the one developed by the French linguist Antoine Culioli (Théorie des Opérations Prédicatives et Énonciatives; for a presentation of the latter in English, see Introduction to a Linguistic Grammar of English: an Utterer-Centered Approach). Utterances contain grammatical items, which both theories posit are markers of linguistic operations forming a deep grammar level.

What makes the Metaoperational Theory original is that the research work done within that framework has uncovered a systematic organization apparently common to all languages. This is founded on what Adamczewski calls the universal ‘principle of cyclicity’, which itself derives from the ‘two-phase vector’, which seems to be key to understanding a number of grammatical microsystems in a wide variety of languages.

=== What is directly observable (markers) and what is not-so-directly observable (linguistic operations) ===
Henri Adamczewski and Claude Delmas consider that "surface utterances contain observable traces of an invisible activity" (1982: 5–transl. ours). These traces are markers of mental operations whose main object is not to enable the speaker to refer to the world, but to indicate how the utterance was built up (e.g., with reference or not to the preceding text), what the speaker's position is relative to what s/he is saying and also relative to the addressee. Such linguistic operations form a finite class, and are apparently common to all languages.

An utterance is therefore the product of a number of operations performed by the speaker, i.e. the person who builds up the utterance and endorses it; grammatical items are traces of those operations, and as such give access to them. Put slightly differently, grammatical markers are key items making it possible to encode and to decode the underlying linguistic operations. To describe this, Adamczewski has coined the expression ‘natural metalanguage’; a natural metalanguage is a means of uncovering ‘the deep grammar’ of a natural language (1995: 35).

Yet, the surface order in which the constituents of the utterance appear does not necessarily correspond to the order in which the mental operations underlying utterance construction were performed by the speaker. Further, the surface order of the constituents varies from language to language while linguistic operations, as has been said before, are supposed to form a stable class common to all languages.

Let us take DO as an example: in a metaoperational theoretic approach, it is a fundamental marker because "it makes plain, in the most direct way possible, the existence of a natural metalanguage in human languages […], it materializes at the surface level the relationship between subject and predicate, and occurs whenever such a material target is necessary" (Adamczewski 1999: 42–transl. ours). DO therefore relates to one of the most fundamental linguistic operations, i.e. predicating, "an operation which represents the very basis of utterance construction" (Adamczewski & Delmas 1982: 79–transl. ours).

=== Invariance and variation ===
Adamczewski posits that each grammatical marker has a core meaning which is stable (‘unvarying’) at a given moment in the history of the language concerned, i.e. in synchronic perspective. Although itself stable, this core meaning can embrace different interpretations of the marker in context, and sometimes widely varying or even contradictory ones. The core meaning of a marker can therefore be determined only through careful analysis and comparison of all the different uses of the marker in context.

The Metaoperational Theory is thus a theoretical framework within which questions as the following may find an answer: What makes it possible for the English modal auxiliary SHOULD to express distinct notions like advice (a), fear (b), doubt (c), etc.?

(a) We should make better use of wind-power.

(b) Fiona did physics in case she should fail in one of the other subjects.

(c) I should think this happened 15 years ago.

In other words, how is the core meaning of SHOULD to be formulated if the theory is to account for the marker's many different uses and meanings (or ‘sense effects’) in context? Or again, how come the French verbal form called ‘the imperfect tense’ (Fr. imparfait, whose grammatical marker can be symbolized -AIT) can express a durative process (i), or a punctual one (ii), and can express a process whose endpoint is reached (iii) or not (iv), etc.?

(i) Le roi ménageait ses sujets pour ne pas les mécontenter.

(ii) Le lendemain même, une lettre arrivait.

(iii) Dans la gare, le train déraillait, causant la mort de 12 personnes sur le quai.

(iv) On entendait jouer du violoncelle dans la pièce attenante.

Adamczewski describes markers such as English SHOULD or French -AIT as ‘protean’ (cf. Fr. opérateurs-protées, a phrase he coined in Adamczewski 1999: 87). Only systematic comparison of the different uses of a marker and careful observation of the formal constructions where it can occur will enable the linguist to get at its core meaning (its ‘invariant’, Fr. invariant). The core meaning is not couched in semantic terms but in metalinguistic ones, i.e. it is a description of the linguistic operation which the marker is a trace of.

The pedagogical advantages of the concept of ‘core meaning’ are numerous. Learning a language is no longer about learning long lists of possible uses of that language's markers and of their particular meanings in context (or ‘sense effects’); it is no longer about learning disparate and often contradictory descriptions, such as ‘punctual imperfect tense’ and ‘durative imperfect tense’; learners can develop a more coherent view of the grammatical system of the language they are studying. Finally, given that core meanings are metalinguistic descriptions of the operations encoded by markers, and also that linguistic operations form a finite class apparently found cross-linguistically, a core-meaning approach should make it easier to learn other languages: the more languages you learn, the more familiar you get with the set of operations, and the simpler the process of language-learning should become.

=== The two-phase theory or the "double-keyboard theory" ===
Adamczewski writes that "the grammatical system of all natural languages is based on the same organizing binary principle, i.e. ‘open/closed paradigmatic choice’" (1999: 45–transl. ours). This single principle underlies the two-phase theory, which is the main constituent of the Metaoperational Theory. The construction process of an utterance, or of any constituent part of an utterance, can go through two phases; Phase 1 is described as the phase of open paradigmatic choice, and Phase 2 as that of closed paradigmatic choice. This principle accounts for the apparent diversity of grammatical microsystems throughout languages, and therefore can be grasped through any binary opposition such as Fr. UN/LE or VOICI/VOILÀ, Eng. TO/-ING or THIS/THAT, Sp. SER/ESTAR, Germ. WOLLEN/SOLLEN, etc.

Any speaker can and does make use of his/her ‘double keyboard’. Thus, in French two prepositions, À and DE, can be selected by the speaker to relate two nouns into a complex NP: N1 À N2 and N1 DE N2. The marker À, e.g. une boîte à pilules ("a pill box"), indicates that the paradigmatic choice of N2 (pilules) is open, which means i) that pilules is selected in the relevant paradigm (that of things for which a box can be designed), and ii) that it is selected by contrast with the other nouns that might have been chosen by the speaker (but finally were not). Such an NP will serve for instance to inform the addressee of what a particular box is intended for (for pills and not cachous or tobacco or...), although in fact the box could very well contain cachous or tobacco. In the NP une boîte de pilules, the preposition DE marks that the paradigmatic choice of N2 pilules is closed, i.e. that paradigmatic contrast between the noun pilules and the other nouns that were eligible candidates is no longer the case. Therefore, at the moment of utterance, quantification (cf. une boîte de "a box of") operates on the result of that ‘closed paradigmatic choice’. In these conditions, the box can actually contain nothing but pills.

In Adamczewski's view "[…] languages have two parallel series of grammatical markers, from which the speaker alternately chooses according to his/her strategy in terms of meaning" (1999: 72–transl. ours). Phase 1 markers are those grammatical items which indicate open paradigmatic choice, while Phase 2 items, marking closed paradigmatic choice, enable the speaker to use the result of that operation to express his/her own standpoint relative to what s/he is saying and relative to the addressee (this for instance could be warning, or regret, or justification...). Phase 2 markers will therefore appear in what is referred to as ‘presupposing contexts’ in the theory. Let us take the example of the French microsystem VOICI/VOILA. In Voici le Professeur X ("This is Professor X"), the NP le Professeur X is non-predictable (open paradigmatic choice), hence the element of surprise that more or less accompanies such utterances; in Voilà le Professeur X ("Here comes Professor X"), somehow the NP le Professeur X is already part of the linguistic context and/or situation of utterance, for instance because it has been mentioned before ("Why! We were just talking about Professor X, and here he comes.").

=== The principle of cyclicity ===
Henri Adamczewski has always rejected the theory according to which children acquire their native language thanks to an unconscious process based on repetition and imitation. He has also consistently opposed the theory of Universal Grammar (UG) put forward by Noam Chomsky; according to that theory, UG is an innate property of the mind, therefore inherited by all children, and in that perspective grammar is an organ that grows in the mind.

Adamczewski claims that the utterances produced by the people around a child (in the family circle, etc.) contain enough evidence for him/her to decipher the grammatical code of their native language. It is the grammatical items found in the utterances which, as traces/markers of linguistic operations, serve as landmarks guiding the child and helping him/her acquire the grammar of their language. "Children find in the linguistic data around them the keys necessary for building up their grammatical system" (Adamczewski, 1995: 76–transl. ours).

In a metaoperational theoretic approach, children first have to get at one of the keys of the double keyboard, i.e. to grasp how a microsystem, just any microsystem, works. Once they have that key, they progressively gain access to the whole grammatical system of their language, because it is based on a single organizing binary principle (cf. preceding paragraph, The two-phase theory or the "double-keyboard theory"). Children infer the rules organizing their language from the structural regularities they detect in the data, even if the conditions in which they gain access to the fundamental principle (‘the principle of cyclicity’) can vary not only from individual to individual but also from language to language.

=== A contrastive approach to the investigation of language and languages ===
At a time when multilingualism is promoted among adults and children, contrastivity, which is one of the major components of the Metaoperational Theory, is an approach making it easier for learners to understand and appropriate the grammatical system of other languages. On a more theoretical level, among other things, a contrastive approach to the investigation of languages enables linguists to evaluate the validity of their theoretical concepts and analyses.

In Adamczewski's words (2002: 55), such an approach opens up "new horizons for an ancient quest" by uncovering the existence of a ‘universal grammar’ based on a number of mental operations common to all natural languages. These operations are marked by grammatical items specific to each individual language, and naturally variation from language to language in the way a particular operation is marked can be quite impressive. But quite naturally too, within a given family of languages (say the Indo-European, the Sino-Tibetan, the Austro-Asiatic, or the Niger-Congo (etc.) family), the items marking the same operation may also happen to display striking resemblances, e.g. Eng. TO and Germ. ZU; Fr. DE and It. DI etc.

Synchronic contrastive study, whether of different languages or of one language (e.g. comparing two dialects of a language), and diachronic contrastive study (e.g. comparing two states in the history of a language) can be a very motivating activity in the language class. Not only does it plug the (apparent) gaps between different languages, it is an opportunity for (re)discovering one's native language as well.

=== An utterer-centered approach ===
In the conception of how language works promoted by the Metaoperational Theory, the speaker – sometimes also referred to as the utterer – is the most important factor in the construction process of an utterance. Even if s/he has no choice but to observe the language-specific rules concerning the way utterances are formed, such as the rule(s) governing word-order in the clause (in those languages that have a fixed word-order), the speaker nevertheless enjoys a certain amount of latitude in building up his/her utterances (Adamczewski 1999: 53). This is the source of what can be called ‘speaker strategy’, which is reflected in the speaker's choice of certain operations. A metaoperational-theoretic approach places focus on speaker strategy. This feature is shared with the other utterer-centered theories, but distinguishes it from the traditional prescriptive approach to grammar, which tends to oversimplify some questions while ignoring others and whose objectives are not of a scientific nature. A teacher who adopts a metaoperational perspective will not teach what should be said (in such and such a situation), but will explain the different strategies, based on distinct linguistic operations, open to the speaker (in such and such a situation). The learner will not learn what should be said but what can be said, what the consequences of the different options are on the making of meaning, and that approach is meant to be quite reassuring.

== Selected bibliography ==
1973. Adamczewski, H. & D. Keen. Phonétique et phonologie de l'anglais contemporain. Paris : Armand Colin.

1974. Adamczewski, H. "Be+ing Revisited". New Insights in Applied Linguistics. Paris : Didier, 45–75.

1982. Adamczewski, H. & C. Delmas. Grammaire linguistique de l’anglais. Paris : Armand Colin.

1991. Adamczewski, H. Le Français déchiffré, Clé du langage et des langues. Paris : Armand Colin.

1992. Adamczewski, H. & J-P. Gabilan. Les Clés de la grammaire anglaise. Paris : Armand Colin.

1995. Adamczewski, H. Caroline grammairienne en herbe ou comment les enfants inventent leur langue maternelle. Paris : Presses de la Sorbonne Nouvelle.

1996. Adamczewski, H. & J-P. Gabilan. Déchiffrer la grammaire anglaise. Paris : Didier.

1999. Adamczewski, H. Clefs pour Babel ou la Passion des langues. St-Leu d'Esserent : EMA.

2002. Adamczewski, H. The secret architecture of English grammar. Précy-sur-Oise : EMA.
