= Annie Ousset-Krief =

French historian and American Civilization specialist

Annie Ousset-Krief, Ph.D. and associate professor at the Université Sorbonne Nouvelle, is a French historian and American Civilization specialist.

== Biography ==
Annie Ousset-Krief received her Ph.D. in American Civilization with thesis, titled "Le «Jewish Messenger» et l'immigration juive d'Europe Orientale aux États-Unis (1870–1902) - Solidarités et antagonismes intercommunautaires" in 2002, under the direction of Serge Ricard.
Annie Ousset-Krief is an associate professor of American Civilization at the Sorbonne Nouvelle - Paris 3 University and currently focuses her work on the North-American Jewish community, on the American East-Coast and French Canada.

== Books ==
- Les Juifs d'Europe Orientale aux États-Unis 1880-1905; Yidn ale brider : immigration et solidarité, L'Harmattan, Paris, 2009
- Les Juifs américains et Israël; De l'AIPAC à JStreet, L'Harmattan, Paris, 2012

== Articles ==
- "Le B'nai Brith de Montréal s'oppose à la Charte de la laïcité du Parti Québécois",Actualité Juive N°1221, August 2012
- "Soukkot à Montréal", Actualité Juive N°1226, October 2012
- "Des Rabbins pour Obama", Actualité Juive N°1227, October 2012
- "L'American Jewish Committee commémore "Freedom Sunday"", Actualité Juive N°1236, December 2012
- "Anatomie du judaïsme américain", Information Juive N°324, July/August 2012
- "L'antisionisme sur les campus américains", Information Juive N°331, March 2013
- "Heureux comme Dieu au Québec...?", Information Juive N°332, April 2013
- "New York aux couleurs d'Israël", Actualité Juive, May 2013
- "Unir les organisations juives", Information Juive N°334, July–August 2013
- "« FDR et les Juifs » : un nouveau livre relance le débat sur l’action du président Roosevelt pendant la Shoah", Information Juive, September 2013
- "Les Juifs de Montréal", Lev Ha'ir magazine N°25, September–October 2013
- "JStreet et Israël", Lev Ha'ir magazine N°26, November 2013
- "Une charte de la laïcité contestée", Lev Ha'ir magazine N°26, November 2013
- "Les Juifs marocains de Montréal", Information Juive, November 2013
- "Il faut libérer Jonathan Pollard", Information Juive, January 2014
- "Bienvenue en Israël, cher ami ! Stephen Harper en Israël", Lev Ha'ir magazine, February 2014

== Interviews ==
- Émission Maison d'étude, France Culture, August 2012
- Élections américaines, Actualité Juive N°1227, October 2012

== Conferences and seminars ==
- Grands débats philosophiques, Cégep de Saint-Hyacinthe, 2006
- « Le yiddishland newyorkais », Colloque International – LERMA Géographies Identitaires : lieu, mémoire, ancrages, Université Aix-Marseille, December 2006
- Knowing the Other: A Discussion on Religious Pluralism in Canadian Society, McGill University, January 2013
- « The Hassidim of Brooklyn: Religion and Interculturality », Congrès 2013 - Angers "Religion et spiritualité", Association française d’Études Américaines, May 2013
- « Les Juifs américains et Israël : vers un affaiblissement des liens ? », Juifs en Amérique du Nord : Histoires et Perspectives, Université Sorbonne Nouvelle-Paris 3, May 2013
- « Outremont: une enclave religieuse dans la cité montréalaise », Le judaïsme nord américain, Culture et religion dans les pays anglophones, February 2014
- « De Po-Lin à Outremont: les Hassidim, passeurs d'identité », Kanade, di Goldene Medine? Perspectives on Canadian-Jewish Literature and Culture conference, University of Łódź, April 2014
