= Jacques Aumont =

French academic and writer on film theory

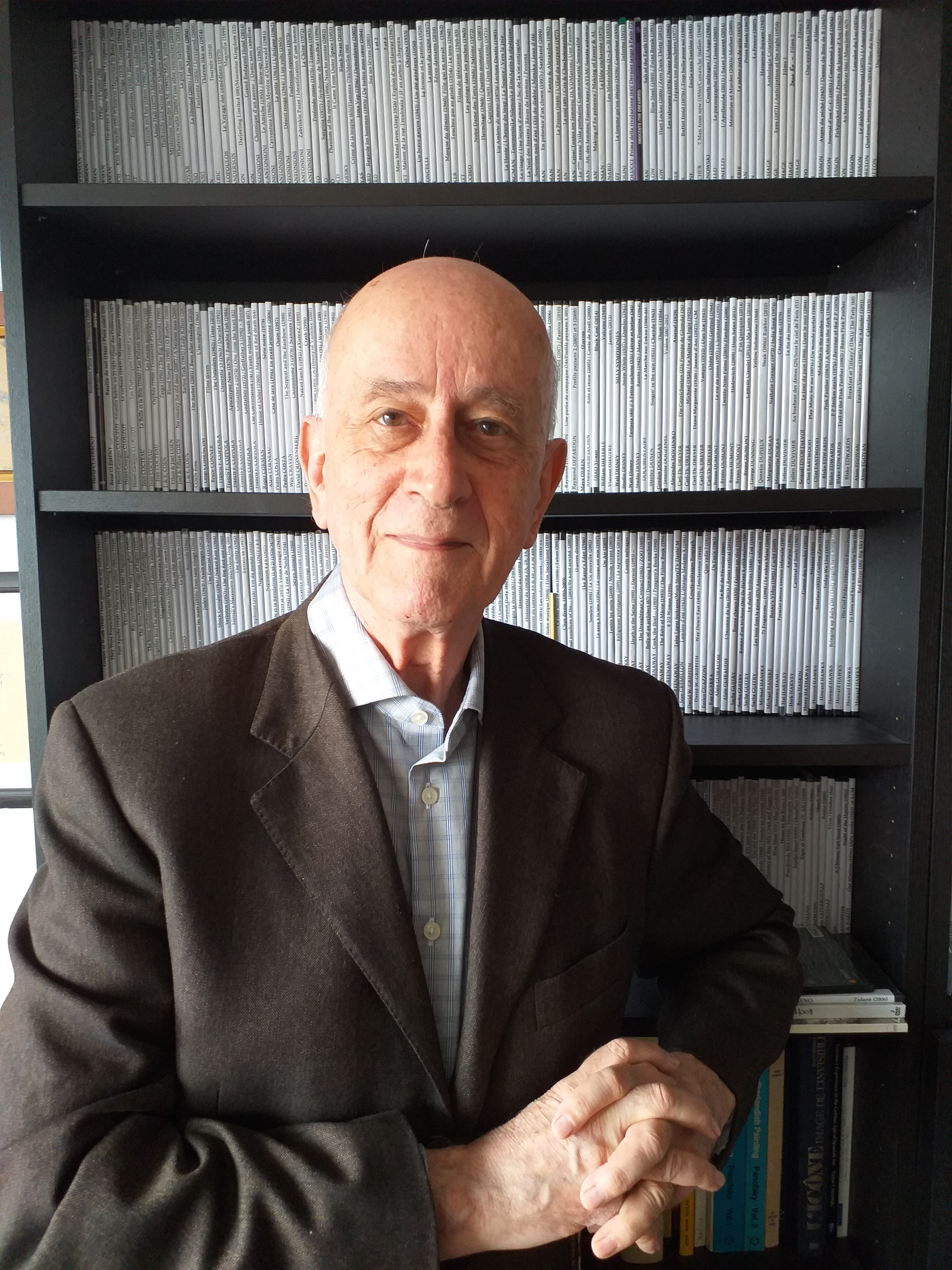
- Born: 25 February 1942 (age 83); Avignon, France
- Occupation(s): Writer, essayist, university professor

Jacques Aumont (born 25 February 1942) is a French academic and writer on film theory.

Born in Avignon he initially trained as an engineer but started contributing film criticism to Cahiers du cinéma in the late 1960s. He is professor emeritus at University of Paris III: Sorbonne Nouvelle, director of studies at the School for Advanced Studies in the Social Sciences, and professor at the École nationale supérieure des Beaux-Arts.

== Work ==
His thought and analysis, rigorous and seductively expressed, have had a definite impact on the theoretical study of cinema, even beyond France's borders. His intellectual work, which began in the context of a film criticism magazine, took on a rational form when he became a teacher and then a university lecturer. His knowledge of the Russian language enabled him to direct the French translation (six volumes) of a selection of Eisenstein's writings (including the Memoirs), and to publish his first essay, Montage Eisenstein (1978). Aumont's essential preoccupation for the next two decades has been an approach to film aes-thetics that gave full rein to the power of the image itself. The first major manifestation of this con-cern was L'Œil interminable (1989), which, at a time of doubt about the future of cinema as an art form, took stock of its place in the figurative arts. The aim of Aumont's work is more critical than historical, as shown by Du visage au cinéma (1992), which takes as its starting point the great silent cinema/talking cinema divide, then goes beyond it to investigate how one of the most nota-ble powers of film art, the close-up, has transformed the very notion of portraiture. More generally, the aim was to identify the power of the film image, and to give meaning to the metaphor "film thinks" (À quoi pensent les films, 1996, Comment pensent les films, 2021): images are tools for thinking, as well as particular manifestations of a human capacity to inform matter; this matter, when visual, has a power of its own that nourishes and distinguishes its propensity for thought. Among his works on aesthetics and the visual is a singular text (Amnésies, 1999), which was the first to focus on Jean-Luc Godard's Histoire(s) du cinéma. More recently, his studies of fiction in cinema (Limites de la fiction, 2014, L'interprétation des films, 2017, Fictions filmiques, 2018) have the particularity of never forgetting that fiction and fig-ure have the same etymology: fiction exists in cinema only on condition that it manifests itself in a certain image material, and to the benefit of certain image powers. Aumont has written for magazines such as Trafic, Cahiers du cinéma, art press, and has been on the editorial board of Cinémathèque and Cinéma, whose program was to combine history, aesthetics and criticism.

== Bibliography ==
- Montage Eisenstein, Albatros, 1979.

- Translated by Lee Hildreth, Constance Penley, and Andrew Ross as Montage Eisenstein, Bloomington: Indiana University Press, 1985.

- (with A. Bergala, M. Marie and M. Vernet) Esthétique du film, Paris: Nathan, 1983.

- Translated and revised by Richard Neupert as Aesthetics of film, Austin: University of Texas Press, 1992.

- (with Michel Marie) L'analyse des films, Paris: Nathan, 1988.
- L'oeil interminable: cinéma et peinture, 1989.
- L'image, Paris: Nathan, 1990.

- Translated as The Image, London: BFI, 1993.

- Du visage au cinéma, 1992.
- Introduction à la couleur: des discours aux images, 1994.
- A quoi pensent les films, 1996.
- De l'esthétique au présent, 1998.
- Amnésies: fictions du cinéma d'après Jean-Luc Godard, 1999.
- (with Michel Marie) Dictionnaire théorique et critique du cinéma, Paris: Nathan, 2001.
- Les théories des cinéastes, Paris: Nathan, 2002.
- Limites de la fiction, Paris: Bayard, 2014.
- Doublures du visible. Voir et ne pas voir en cinéma, Villeneuve d'Asq, Presses du Septentrion, 2021.
- Comment pensent les films. Apologie du filmique, Paris, Mimesis, 2021.
