= Yaron Golan =

Israeli publisher

- ירון גולן
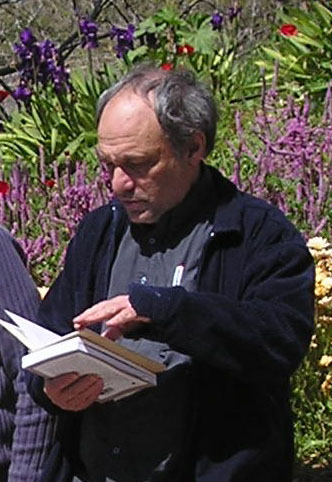
- Born: April 26, 1949
- Died: January 23, 2007 (aged 57)
- Resting place: Tel-Aviv, Israel
- Occupations: Publisher, columnist

Yaron Golan (Hebrew: ירון גולן; April 26, 1949 – January 23, 2007) was an Israeli publisher.

Yaron Golan, originally a literature columnist in Haaretz, established a publishing company in 1990. While refusing to submit to conventional rules of publishing only popular or profitable books, he used to take on himself to publish every book submitted to him, publishing over 1000 books, often at a personal loss. However he still was the publisher of many important works, including anthologies by Nathan Zach and Avot Yeshurun. Golan died unexpectedly of cardiac arrest on January 23, 2007, and was buried the following day in Tel-Aviv.
