= The Legend of the Prophet and the Assassin =

2000 video game

- Developer: Arxel Tribe
- Publishers: EU: Arxel Tribe, Wanadoo Edition; NA: DreamCatcher Interactive
- Platforms: Windows, Macintosh
- Release: The Prophet and the Assassin: EU: October 2000; The Secrets of Alamût: EU: March 20, 2001; Collection release: NA: July 2001
- Genre: Adventure
- Mode: Single-player

The Legend of the Prophet and the Assassin is an adventure game by Arxel Tribe. It is the sequel to Pilgrim: Faith as a Weapon. It was released in October 2000 for Windows. The game is inspired by the work of Brazilian novelist Paulo Coelho. A sequel, The Secrets of Alamût was released in March 2001.

The two games were later released as one game by DreamCatcher Interactive in North America under The Legend of the Prophet and the Assassin title. The first game was called Part 1 and The Secrets of Alamût was called Part 2.

== Development ==
=== Engine ===
We have… optimised the ratio between available information and information that takes into account the limits of human perception. Also, we have optimised trade-off between compression level and decompression speed 24 bit CIN Movie was [sic] used in Faust. Two new technologies will be used in this game 24 bit CIN Vision and new CIN Interactive - the interactive movie technology which is the new frontier in game development.

— Arxel Tribe, referring to The Legend of the Prophet and the Assassin, "Engine" tab in the "Making Of" section of the Legend website

=== Graphics ===
Examples of how the 3D designs evolved from wire frames (left) to the final 3D models featured in the game (right).

The 3D graphics of the game were created using the Maya software featured on Silicon Graphics computers. Firstly, 3D modelling was done using character model sheets (seen in three poses: face-on, profile, and back), as well as the ground plans and elevations of the sets. Texture was then added to the core wire frames. Secondly lighting and colouring was added by illustrators, often using the brush tool. Next the animation team placed the virtual cameras and defined their movements. Finally post-production was done to polish the cinematic scenes.

=== Other ===
Over 20 crew members from this project collaborated on the video games Alfred Hitchcock Presents The Final Cut, Seven Games of the Soul, Jerusalem: The Three Roads to the Holy Land, and Mistmare.

Legend saw releases in the United Kingdom, France, United States, Canada, Belgium, Russia, and Brazil. Secrets saw releases in United Kingdom, France, United States, Russia, and Germany.

A quiz on The Legend of the Prophet and the Assassin was included on the game's main page, with the winner receiving a copy of Paulo Coelho's latest book. The Secrets of Alamût was created with the participation of Egypt Nile Cruises, Timberland, and Lexpress.fr. This was because a competition was conducted for the release of The Secrets of Alamût which ended on 25 April 2001; the prizes were two trips to Egypt, 15 Timberland jackets, and a 150 copies of the game.

== Plot and gameplay ==
Taking place in the 13th century, the player takes control of Ay-Sayf, who is a former Knight Templar and Crusader. He is on a mission to meet a false prophet named Simon. The Secrets of Alamût is a continuation of this story

The game is a first-person point-and-click adventure that follows the gaming conventions of titles such as Myst, in which the player must traverse a series of static clickable screens to move around, and manipulate a series of carriable items to solve puzzles and progress. The games have an inventory system, and unlike their predecessor have a 360-degree freedom of movement.

== Reception ==
The 3D graphics were completed in a four step process. This is a demonstration of the art style of Legend.

=== The Legend of the Prophet and the Assassin ===
In 2000, Adventurearchiv reviewer Annemarie said that the abrupt ending and difficult "star" puzzle tarnished her complete enjoyment of the game. Jeux Video thought the game was limited in terms of the interactivity of the gameplay. Game Genie's James Allen explained that in his opinion there wasn't a single redeeming feature to the game, tying it with Airport Tycoon and Hot Wired as the worst game he'd reviewed; he asserted that it "sucked" and soured his opinion of adventure games, and claimed he'd "I'll never let [Dreamcaster Interactive] live that down". GameKult described the game as flat and lacking in fun. Jeanne Muse wrote in UHS in 2001 that the timed sequences may cause annoyance to gamers. Westlake of Game Over Online expressed that the game was mediocre; not bad but not recommendable either. Randy Sluganski of Just Adventure asserted that despite it being historically based, he did not consider the game to be educational. Gordon Aplin of Quandary noted that while the story is interesting it does not come to a complete resolution. Knight Ridder/Tribune Business News writer Phil LaRose gave the game a scathing review, commenting on its "relatively primitive technology", "simplistic gameplay", and "decided incoherence". In 2002 Balmoral Software noted that the game lacked humour and instead favoured a darker tone. In 2008, Avsn-nikki of Adventurespiele thought that the graphics were impressive for the time period, but didn't stand up to contemporary standards. In a four-page review in the Polish site Gry Online, among other comments Boleslaw Wojtowicz praised the Arabic inspired musical soundscape. SK Online wrote that the game contained masterpieces of graphic design. PC Games wrote that tightness, lightness, and grippiness of Coelho's work was not translated to the game. Masha Arimanova of Game.EXE described the experience as "complex, but fleeting".

=== The Secrets of Alamût ===
Adventure-Archiv suggested that the only reason this game and its prequel were released separately was because of business reasons; to make more money. Game Captain thought the puzzles were average and disliked that there was sometimes a need to use trial and error. In contrast, G Base thought the puzzles were logical and well thought out. Randy Sluganski of Just Adventure noted that the game forced the player to think about deep concepts that other video games wouldn't present. Universal Hint System's Jeanne Muse thought that the fact you have to uninstall Legend to play Secrets despite them being two parts of the same story reduced the game's replayability. Media & Games Online Network described the game as "old-fashioned" and noted it would disappoint FPS fans. SK Online liked the way the narrative tackled internal conflicts and dilemmas. Gordon Aplin of Metzomagic and Quandary thought the game's finale offered a "truly thought provoking" piece of dialogue. 4Players.de wrote that the game should appeal to puzzle enthusiasts, although felt that those who are a fan of superlative graphics should wait for Myst III: Exile. PC Games described the title as an "unimpressive decal of Myst". Masha Arimanova of Gaming.EXE thought the game was more exciting, harmonious and satisfyingly contradictory than its prequel.
