= Pilgrim: Faith as a Weapon =

1997 video game

- Developer: Arxel Tribe
- Publisher: Infogrames Multimedia
- Designers: Nicolas Fructus, Moebius
- Writer: Paulo Coelho
- Composers: Jacques Nelissen, Kristjan Cocev
- Platform: Microsoft Windows
- Release: November 1997
- Genres: Adventure, educational

Pilgrim: Faith as a Weapon is a 1997 adventure video game, written by Paulo Coelho, who wrote The Pilgrimage, the novel on which the game is based. Pilgrim has been described as a "commercial cultural heritage game" and "graphic interactive fiction". It is the premiere title of Arxel Tribe and the first in an adventure trilogy, which also includes The Legend of the Prophet and the Assassin (1999) and The Secrets of Alamut (2001).

== Plot ==
The second half of the game sees a tonal shift from the first. Upon meeting the character of Petrus (pictured), Pilgrim goes beyond a series of fetch-quests and becomes infused with the philosophies of Coelho's novel and encompasses a larger spiritual narrative.

The game is loosely based on Paulo Coelho's 1987 autobiographical novel The Pilgrimage. It is a time of superstition and religious persecution, where Catharism reigns supreme. Set at the beginning of the Albigensian Crusade (1208) in the south of France, the story sees Simon Lancroix aim to complete his dying father's wishes by finding a secret manuscript and delivering it to a friend named Petrus. It is revealed that this is actually a Coptic manuscript that a renegade Templar brought back from the Crusades; it is believed to be the lost Gospel of Saint Jean. This manuscript is passed around to various characters in different locations. Meanwhile, Pope Innocent III orders the inquisitor, Diego de Osma, to retrieve the manuscript. Mystical creatures such as angels and demons also become entangled in the battle.

The first half of the game sees the player complete a series of tasks to help other characters. They in turn help the player. Halfway through the game, the player meets Petrus. He reveals that the player's father was the leader of a fictional religious sect called "The Tradition", which aims to bring an absolute truth that no other religion can. From this point the game covers symbolic, spiritual, and supernatural philosophies such as dreams, peace, compassion, love, salvation, the Four Horsemen of the Apocalypse, growing up and giving up, and re-learning what we knew as children; the final scene takes place in Limbo.

== Gameplay ==
Pilgrim is a first-person point-and-click adventure. Players click through a series of static frames—a slideshow of pre-rendered 3D environments—to move around. The player is not free of their movements and must often strategically click screen points in a certain order to reach a destination. The cursor becomes an arrow to indicate a possible movement, and a click transitions the player to the next location. It is possible to die in the game; one cause of death includes the player failing to accomplish certain time-dependent challenges. If the player dies they are returned to the beginning of the latest checkpoint, often after a cutscene. There are also two unwinnable states. One of them occurs if the player gives all their money to a beggar in Toulouse, in spite of needing it to go past the very next door. The player is encouraged to "save early, save often". The game's final puzzle has been described as "no less than an exam about what you're supposed to have learned". The game comes with two discs, which are required to install the game; regardless of where the player is, Disc 1 must be inserted every time they boot up the game.

The "Inventory" interface has three elements. "Bag" is used for acquired items. The number of items and the weight a player can carry are limited. "People" contains the characters the player has encountered, knows about, or wants information on. "Items" has the objects which have been seen or heard about but not acquired. "People" and "Items" of interest can be brought up as topics of conversation with others. To use an item in "Bag", the player clicks on it to activate it (it then has a yellow box around it), then clicks "View". To offer a topic of discussion, the player clicks on an item in the "People" or "Items" tabs to activate it. They then click on a character in the "View" screen to talk about it. The puzzles require both reflection and patience. The "Bag" items and the clues within the "Encyclopedia" can be applied and manipulated to solve puzzles thereby advancing the story. The latter is similar to how the Chronopedia in used in the Broderbund adventure game Carmen Sandiego's Great Chase Through Time. The game has a hint system to provide clues for the more obscure puzzles. The entries in the in-game "Encyclopedia" have been described as "spartan", consisting exclusively of text. Sometimes when a character mentions a topic that is available in the "Encyclopedia" during a conversation. A keyword will appear on the screen which may then be clicked to bring up the corresponding entry. While not required, this feature allows the player to delve deeper into the interesting historical nuggets featured throughout the game. The player has an in-game notebook, into which they may copy-paste extracts from the "Encyclopedia".

== Development ==
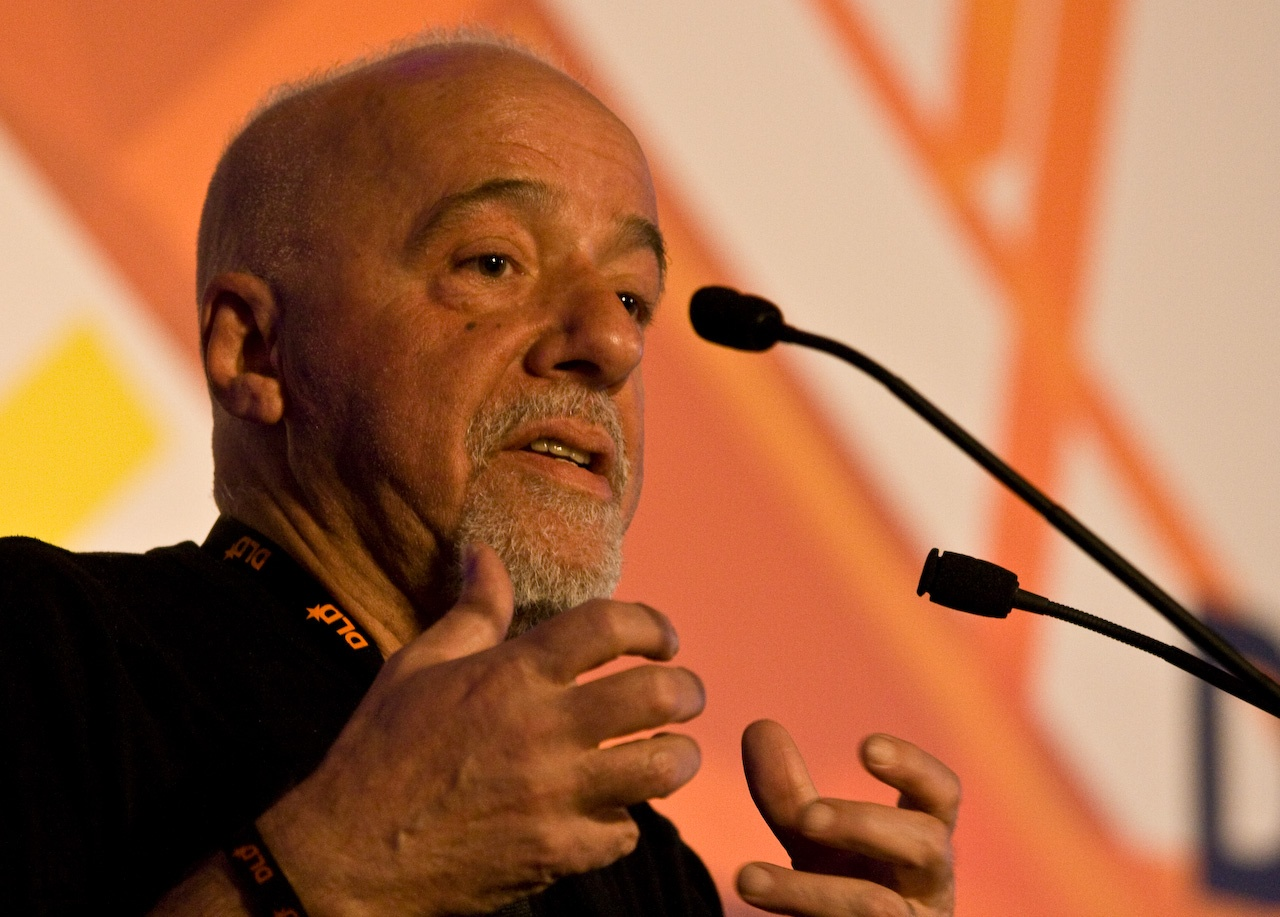
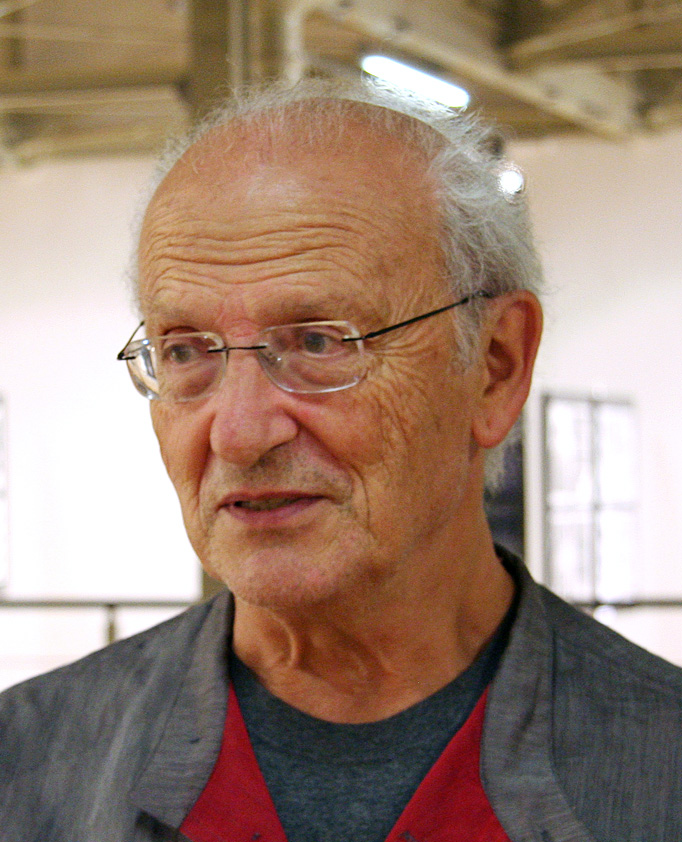
Pilgrim was based on a novel by Paulo Coelho (above), who served as the game's screenwriter. Moebius (below) joined the project as lead designer.

=== Inspiration ===
Arxel Tribe was founded in 1990 by two Slovenian architects — Matjaž Požlep and Diego Zanco. Before Pilgrim, the company was known for designing and producing animated computer graphics for the architecture industry on Silicon Graphics computers at three agencies in Ljubljana, Paris and Milan. Frenchmen Stephen Carrière and Guillaume de Fondaumière joined the company three years later in 1993. They helped to diversify it into a special effects company for the advertising industry in 1994 by creating an educational film for an Italian design agency, which went on to win awards and be featured at the Berlin Film Festival. That experience gave the team a desire to create graphics as a means of expression and to pursue more ambitious projects in the entertainment industry — specifically video games. Arxel Tribe tried unsuccessfully to raise funds for over a year to pursue this goal. In 1996, Anne Carriére Multimédia was founded as a subsidiary arm of Éditions Anne Carrière, the French publisher of work by Brazilian novelist Paulo Coelho and French cartoon artist Jean Giraud (also known as Mœbius). The subsidiary was created to specialise in the production of a genre of video games called "author games"; they chose Arxel Tribe to serve as the title's development team. Stephen Carrière's mother, Anne, was the head of Éditions Anne Carrière. This connection gave Arxel Tribe the opportunity to collaborate with a high calibre of creative talent on its debut foray into the video game space.

The premiere project of the new venture was chosen by Anne Carriére Multimédia to be an adventure game based on Coelho's The Pilgrimage (1987). The artistic direction was handed to French comic artist and frequent video game collaborator Jean Giraud (aka Moebius); The Pilgrimage would be his last gaming project. Moebius had previously illustrated the French edition of one of Coelho's books, and had designed covers for gaming projects such as Panzer Dragoon (1995) and Fade to Black (1995). Coelho's books had sold millions of copies providing an incentive for the threads of his work to be woven into PC games. According to SK Online, Coelho "accepted the proposal with great pleasure" after learning that the general appearance of the game would be decided by Moebius. Moebius and Coelho began the design work in 1996. Also in 1996, a year since their last diversification, Arxel Tribe had a meeting with Coelho and Moebius. This resulted with the company switching gears to become a video game development studio and signing onto the project, which was to be published by Infogrames in 1997. Fondaumière recalls "sitting at a bar in Frankfurt with Paulo Coelho [and] discussing the crazy idea of creating a videogame together". Carrière and de Fondaumière helped Arxel Tribe re-position itself as a developer of "author games", and the company bought the rights to publish a video game adaption of Pilgrim. Arxel Tribe had made a lot of money in the advertising industry and was increasingly interested in moving into the video gaming industry; they were in a financial position that enabled them to pursue this vision. Moebius required an investment of 20 million francs (approx. $4 million US at the time) to become involved. Matja Požlep noted that creating a game based on Coelho's work was a good idea because potential customers would already be acquainted with his work. Guillaume de Fondaumiere recalled that as professionals, Coelho and Mobius charged a high price for their work and had a highly ambitious, challenging, and expensive vision. Arxel Tribe's lack of experience in video game development meant that the collaboration became a "fantastic, but also a painful experience" much to their dismay. The game was originally called Pilgrim during the development stage, and by its release had the subtitle Faith as a Weapon.

Arxel Tribe chose adventure gaming because the genre had recently been experiencing technological advancements that were comparable to those seen in the shooting genre. New releases such as Doom (1993) and Quake (1996), had opened up new graphical and narrative possibilities. Arxel Tribe aimed to create an adventure game with an "epic" and "gripping" narrative that did justice to the source material's "initiatory, romantic and spiritual journey". They wanted to make a "humanist journey with a very deep storyline", instead of being "just another adventure game". The development company collaborated with Coelho in adapting the story into more of an investigative detective mystery to better immerse the player while encouraging them to use logic and their imagination. The early 13th century was chosen as the game's time period because of its "historical and mythical richness" abundant with heresy, crusades, and errands by knights. The developers felt this was the ideal setting to illustrate the "generous and humanist philosophy" inherent in Coelho's book. Carrière said that video game manufacturers were drawn to comic book writers, screenwriters or cartoonists because of their desire to create a unique graphic universe that sets the game apart from the rest of the market. Matjaz Požlep said the company worked within an adventure gaming niche and within that an intellectual gaming sub-niche. At his time 46 people were working on Arxel Tribe games at their Ljubljana headquarters.

=== Design ===
Examples of the original concept art by Moebius (above) and the final 3D models featured in the game (below).

While Guillaume de Fondaumière considered video gaming a mere extension of their 3D studio business, he was neither a programmer nor a graphic artist, so he assumed the role of producer and sought to find people who cared about the creative side of game development. With a team of "galley slaves", they managed to complete the game in a mere 15 months.

Moebius collaborated with Arxel Tribe's artistic director Nicolas Fructus on the game's design elements to draw the concept art for scenes and characters. The development company felt that Moebius' drawings enhanced the magical quality of the story, and provided a sense of cultural and spiritual curiosity, transcending the generic conventions of the adventure game genre. The 2D character design work was done in both Ljubljana and Paris, while the adaptation of the designs using 3D graphics software was completed in Ljubljana Computer artists created 3D images from Moebius' drawings using Silicon Graphics computers (such as Onyx and Indigo 2, which they had used in previous non-video game projects); they mixed traditional computer graphics techniques, such as rigging, with motion capture to animate the characters.

The game's 3D engine was created in-house at Pilgrim, and the computer-rendered elements like scenes and characters were made to look on a par with the top-level video game developers of the time. Marcin Mierzejewski Zenzire approached Arxel Tribe in 1996 to become a 3D modeller and animator but was hired instead as a coder for this game. At the time the company had limited coding experience from their previous multimedia projects, so needed a professional coder. Zenzire "set up the initial architecture for the game engine, coded some UI routines and the game's interactive encyclopedia", using expertise from his work using hypertext. He also "supervised the code and offered assistance with other programming tasks".

Early in development, complete literature research was carried out to provide the team with a comprehensive and faithful design guide containing each historical element the project required, such as clothes, architecture and landscapes. To give the player a colourful window into the complexities of the time period, a multimedia "Encyclopedia" containing biographical information such as maps, articles, and paintings was included in-game; the over 150 page data bank is divided into three parts: "History & Geography", "Life in the Middle Ages" and "Religion". This 13th-century information was added to provide additional historical knowledge and context. The game was created with the participation of Le Centre National de la Cinématographie and the Ministèr Délégué à la Poste aux Télécommunications et à l'Espace.

Most of the game's background music was not written for the game; it was chosen instead from preexisting music, largely from the Medieval and Romantic periods. This includes Symphony No. 1 in D major by Gustav Mahler, a piece by Fernando Sor, a guitar-transcribed version of Isaac Albéniz's piano pieces Suite Española No. 1, Op. 47 and Cantos de España and "Greensleeves". The pieces are relatively short and loop indefinitely in their respective locations. The game is in the SVGA 640x480 aspect ratio, and was made available in English, French, German and Brazilian Portuguese.

=== Release ===
In June 1997, Arxel reported on their website that the game was likely to be completed by December with a world release planned for Spring 1998. At the time, Anne Carierre Multimedia was confirmed as co-producer of the game, while negotiations were still going on with the major worldwide distribution companies. Later that year, Infogrames Entertainment signed a first publishing and distribution contract with Arxel Tribe. The project was officially announced to the press during a candlelit dinner held in a castle in Ljubljana in September 1997, with an intended release date of November 1998. The small multimedia studio treated the journalists to a sample of local handicrafts at the beginning of the evening. It then invited them to a conference in the castle hall.

The game was released in the US and Europe in November 1997 in English, French (Pilgrim: Par le Livre et par l'Epée), and German (Pilgrim: Das Geheimnis der Schrift). The a Brazilian Portuguese edition entitled O Diário de um Mago was released in January 1998. The game ended up being published first in the UK in February 1998 by Infogrames Multimedia; the French publication was handled by Wanadoo Edition (formed by Index+'s acquisition of France's Télécom Multimédia), and the French trailer was created by Eurospace, advertised by Infogrames, and directed by Lioux Philippe. The game could also be purchased from the Arxel Tribe webstore. As a promotion, Arxel Tribe announced they would give a free copy of the game to the first 200 people ask the company for it. In total, $2 million was invested in the venture; of this, $1 million went toward the production of the title by Arxel Tribe and Anne Carrière Multimedia, while another $1 million was spent to promote the title which was distributed worldwide by French company Infogrames. 250,000 copies of the video game were published.

Just Adventure described Pilgrim as a "little-known title", noting that by the time of the release of its sequel, The Legend of the Prophet and the Assassin in 1999, Pilgrim had still not been released in North America. It noted that there were three potential culprits for the gaming "gem" suffering lack of recognition: little to no marketing by Arxel Tribe, the publisher not understanding how to sell the product, and the gaming industry simply being apathetic toward adventure games at the time. Game coder Marcin Mierzejewski Zenzire later argued that while the title was a decent success among adventure fans and created a reasonable amount of media buzz, Arxel Tribe used the boom in popularity to promote themselves rather than the game. This meant a "comparatively small number of copies was [sic] printed and therefore sold out almost immediately". SK Online wrote that the game was only a half-hearted success, partly because of the lack of advertising, but also because it had some technical deficiencies when compared to its contemporaries. Clovis of Gameboomers noted that during its rollout, there were "significant delays in delivery". Just Adventure reported that Pilgrim was originally supposed to be included as a bonus feature in the release of The Legend of the Prophet and the Assassin, but that this idea was later abandoned, describing it as "yet another marketing mistake". The article, published between Pilgrim's original and re-releases, further explained that while the game was very rare, it could occasionally be found on eBay and the Game Trading Zone. In its review of The Secrets of Alamut in July 2001, Just Adventure wrote that Pilgrim had experienced a "rejuvenation in sales" in the time since it had been listed it in "The Ten Best Games That (Almost) No One Has Ever Played" article. Despite that, in 2002, Tap Repeatedly still lamented that the game had sunk into relative obscurity between its 1998 and 2001 releases. On the contrary, VGDb said the game was a "great success", while Arxel Tribe asserted that their game had been recognised by both players and critics for its originality and being faithful to Coelho's work. Guillaume de Fondaumiere told Game.EXE that the game sold "surprisingly well", and that due to the efforts of Infogrames, 40,000 copies were sold in France alone. Relations Presse asserted that the game received an impressive number of articles in the public press as a result of their public relations stunt at the Ljubljana castle.

The game was not reprinted until three years after its original release. It was re-released in France in March 2001, and the US in November 2001, (by Selectsoft Publishing) as a Deluxe Edition — in some cases simply as Pilgrim without its subtitle. The re-release contained 3 CD-ROMs: the game discs and a bonus "Making Of" disc featuring an interview with Coelho, 14 storyboards by Moebius, an Encyclopaedia of the Middle Ages, and a walkthrough solution of the game. On February 28, 2001, French adventure company Nival Interactive announced that it had signed a contract with Wanadoo Edition for the release of a Russian version of Pilgrim in the second quarter of that year. This project was never realised, however, 1C did publish the Russian versions of the sequels. In March 2001, Guillaume de Fondaumiere expressed a desire to find a publisher to facilitate the localisation and distribution of the title in Russia, suggesting that players should play the game in their own languages to fully appreciate it. In 2002, CD Projekt issued a Polish version of the game in response to the wave of popularity around Paolo Coelho and The Pilgrimage at the time. While created for Windows 3.1 or Windows 95, to be played using a Pentium 75 MHz chip and at least 16 Mbytes of RAM, the game is able to run under XP and Vista on 32-bit.

== Reception ==
Reception

Review scores
Publication	Score
PC Power	77/100
PowerPlay	71%
Adventure-Archiv	70%
Just Adventure	A
Metzomagic	3/5
Jeux Video	7.0/10
Adventurespiele	70%
Puntaeclicca	7.5/10
Feibel	3/6
Play DVD	5/10
Przygodoskop	2/5
Old-Games.ru	2.5/5
PC Joker	71%
PC Jeux	82%
PC Player	64%
PC Action	59%
GameStar	58%
PC Games	45%
Privat Computer PC	14%

Awards
Publication	Award
Just Adventure	Listed 7th in article The 10 Best Adventure Games That (Almost) No One Has Ever Played
La Croix	Selected for the article French creators innovate with poetry

In June 1997, before the game's release, Stop magazine published an article which described the game's genre as most akin to the video game Myst (1993), in terms of its technical design. Upon the game's announcement in September 1997, Marijô Zilveti of Folha De S.Paulo expressed joy that the game would bear a resemblance to Coelho's novel as he was directly involved in the creation of the script. In October 1997, PC Jeux wrote that its beauty and intensity made up for its "technical poverty". In November 1997, La Croix selected the game for its article Les créateurs français innovent avec poésie (French Creators Innovate with Poetry), describing the game as a "historical-New Age quest". That month, PC Joker wrote that the game's bugs were enough to sour the player experience, despite the title's beautiful aesthetic design. In December 1997, PC Player said it was initially turned off by the cumbersome, bland, and strange game, but after a while became enamoured by the "mystery and profundity" of the game's images and sounds. Power Play negatively compared the game to Broken Sword: The Shadow of the Templars, PC Action described the interface as "unusual but very intuitive", GameStar negatively compared the game to Riven and Zork: Grand Inquisitor while accusing it of being both too complicated and obsolete, and PC Games said the game lacked tension, variety and mental challenge. In January 1998, PC Power praised the animations and the elaborate background information, though lamented that it missed award status by having handling and gameplay issues. That year, Joe Nettleback of PowerPlay wrote that he was pleased with the German dub. In 1998, Nataliya Dubrovskaya of Game.EXE said that the game was a beautiful entry in the "Euroadventure" genre, along with contemporaries such as Dark Earth, Nightmare Creatures, and Cryo Interactive titles like Atlantis: The Lost Tales, Dreams to Reality, and Versailles.; the site praised the game's beauty and solid story. Privat Computer PC loathed the game, describing it as a "French failure"

In 2001, Ray Ivey of Just Adventure, a self-professed fan of the developer who enjoyed Ring (1999) and Faust (1999), picked up Pilgrim "mostly out of academic interest" to examine Axel Tribe's debut work; he described the title as "lovely", "mysterious", "educational", "compelling", and a great entry in the adventure game genre. That same year Randy Sluganski ranked the game 7th in his list of The 10 Best Adventure Games That (Almost) No One Has Ever Played in the same publication, complimenting it for tackling subjects such as theology and superstition, and describing it as an "artistic tour-de-force" that addresses its themes with a sense of adventurousness, power, and scope. Gordon Aplin of Metzomagic and Quandary did not buy the game when it was originally released as the box cover mislead him into thinking it was an action/adventure game like Knight's Chase. After playing the game in 2001 he deemed it a valiant first effort by Arxel but incomparable to the later titles like Ring and Faust. In a 1999 Faust review Metzomagic's Steve Metzler said the company had "improved tremendously" when compared to Pilgrim's "incomprehensible" puzzle design. In a 2002 review Tap Repeatedly's Enigma described Pilgrim as "mind-blowing", "stunning", "outrageous", and "constantly interesting".

In 2003, Polish adventure game review site Przygodoskop wrote that the title had outdated graphics, a dull narrative, and ordinary puzzles, and considered its Polish release a cash-grab due to the popularity around the author at the time. In a 2004 review of the game, JPP of Jeux Video said he preferred the beginning of the game due to its logical puzzles, as opposed to the latter half's "spiritual initiatory quest" narrative which has vague puzzles to match. In 2006, Avsn-nikki of Adventurespiele admitted that the graphics appeared outdated, and noted that in order to succeed you need to ask every individual character every tiny conversation thread. Old-Games.ru listed the game in its International Festival of Adventure as a rare and interesting entry in the genre. The site noted that the game was released just after historical-themed adventure games came into fashion in the late 1990s, while praising the novice developer for Moebius' beautiful work and favourably comparing Coelho's confident script to the work of Cryo Interactive and index+; the site criticised the interface for taking up nearly half the screen and the transformation of Moebius' "cute and stylish" 2D drawings into low-polygon 3D dummies, but deemed it a historical, cultural, and entertainment achievement, and praised the developer's use of authentic melodies expressing a desire for them to continue this in their future work. AVEC's Andrea Maroni thought the game did not attract "the interest it deserved".

Puntaeclicca's Aspide Gioconda liked the game from both a historical and puzzle design perspective despite the game's bugs affecting its quality level. Quedzas Video Games thought the game's music was beautiful and atmospheric, citing the tune playing at Saint-Sernin as evoking a sense of mystery. Mr. Bill & Lela from Mr. Bill's Adventureland Review praised the game for mixing educational historical elements seamlessly into the intriguing story. Abandonware France thought the graphics were plastic-like, yet detailed and impressive for the time; the site also thought the French voice acting was generally good. The book Le Livre de Sagesse: Supports, Médiations, Usages noted that games like Pilgrim demonstrate how the player's actions allow them to write or rewrite history; the fate of the narrative is in their hands. Studies in Medievalism explains that Pilgrim is one of only a handful of adventure video games set in the medieval period, alongside entries like Cryo Interactive's Arthur's Knights, noting that Pilgrim "tries so hard to be authentic". Camille Saint-Jacques of Arts contemporains, 1950–2000 thought Moebius' contribution to the game was an example of the interest graphic artists of the time (particularly young ones) had in multimedia and the video games industry, which offered a more magnetic pull than traditional neuvième art (comic books); it noted that the Slovenian designers did not "disdain to be interested" in collaborating with a comic book artist. On his review site Feibel, German journalist Thomas Feibel felt the 3D characters moved around like "living helium balloons", due to their movements lacking in detail and precision. Gameboomers reviewer Clovis noted that pixel hunting is required early on and that puzzles toward the end were so obscure he was forced to use a walkthrough.

Damien Poussier of Hardcore Gaming 101 asserted that Pilgrim is the resulting blend of the "relative seriousness" and "classic feel" of Arxel Tribe (which he compared with Cryo Interactive), the "great artwork" of Moebius, and the "ridiculous new age philosophy" and "low-grade proselytizing" of Coelho. Poussier also compared the gameplay to Myst and liked that the game did not follow the book too closely, noting that a "stain" of the "author's influence" was not noticeable until the game's midpoint; he thought the scene with Petrus was "completely out of the blue" and "filled with absolute nonsense that even the stonest {sic]] of all hippies would find laughable". The Hardcore Gaming 101 reviewer also criticised the plastic-like characters which did not resemble Moebius' work, having to wait for characters to complete an animation before answering each question, and the "excruciatingly awful" voice acting of many characters, particularly the incorrect French and Spanish accents. Poussier praised the atmospheric music, as well as the "well-handled" education despite lamenting that the encyclopedia would have been more palatable had its walls of text been sprinkled with some images.

== Legacy ==
The game received the Golden CD-ROM award in France and other international awards. According to Arxel Tribe, the game's release saw the developer become recognised for its "author games", which had beautiful graphics and an in-depth scenario. The game turned out to be Arxel Tribe's prelude; it was followed by the company's "international breakthrough" hit Ring (1998), based on an opera by Richard Wagner, which would sell 600,000 copies. Ring's game engine was based on the one created for Pilgrim, so the titles had a similar architecture and design.

After the release of Pilgrim, Paulo Coelho decided to use this collaboration and newfound interest in interactive entertainment as the inspiration behind a recurring plot point in his 1998 novel Veronika Decides to Die. This was released the same year as Pilgrim's sequel The Legend of the Prophet and the Assassin. In Veronika Decides to Die, the suicidal Ljubljana-born heroine reads an article in the French magazine Homme about a computer game developed in Slovenia and written by Coelho. There are many references to Pilgrim and Coelho's thoughts on the experience throughout the book; the following passage illustrates this:

"Having nothing more interesting to do, [Veronika] decided to read the whole article, and she learned that the said computer game had been made in Slovenia -that strange country that no one seemed quite able to place, except the people who lived there – because it was a cheap source of labor. A few months before, when the product was launched, the French manufacturer had given a party for journalists from all over the world in a castle in Vled. Veronika remembered reading something about the party; which had been quite an event in the city, not just because the castle had been redecorated in order to match as closely as possible the medieval atmosphere of the CD-ROM, but because of the controversy in the local press: Journalists from Germany, France, Britain, Italy and Spain had been invited, but not a single Slovene..."

— Paulo Coelho, excerpt from his 1998 novel Veronika Decides to Die

After Pilgrim, it was decided that the "fruitful collaboration" between Arxel Tribe and Coelho would continue; this resulted in the creation of two more games set in the Medieval Middle East, creating an adventure trilogy. The Legend of the Prophet and the Assassin, also known as The Prophet's Trail, (called The Legend of As-Sayf: The Prophet and the Assassin during the development stage), is sometimes referred to as Pilgrim II. It is, however, less a direct sequel and more an "entirely new story about the same era as seen from another perspective", which carries over into the third game The Secrets of Alamut. Described by Guillaume de Fondaumiere as a "kind of continuation", the game takes place 50 years after the events in Pilgrim, although it explores many of the same themes. Just Adventure noted that when the sequel was released in North America, Pilgrim still had not been made available, so there was no point in marketing the game as Pilgrim II. In some releases the two games are considered Part 1 and Part 2 of the Legend series, with the bundled release also known as The Legend of the Prophet and the Assassin. Throughout the adventure trilogy, Pilgrim protagonist Simon de Lancroix evolves from a "young, sense-seeking" person to someone who has "matured to a prophet, although not loved by everyone", according to Adventure-Archiv. However, Damien Poussier of Hardcore Gaming 101 argues that while Simon de Lancroix is mentioned in the sequel, the name is not referring to the same character from Pilgrim. The Lancroix of the sequels is a European prophet who wanted to construct an oasis of peace called Jébus. The three titles would form a collection — with The Legend of the Prophet and the Assassin (2000) and The Secrets of Alamut (2001), which continued the story. Guillaume de Fondaumiere later said that while he was proud of the game, it was not particularly impressive by the standards of the time. Many of the crew who worked on this game would work together on other projects. 20 members of the creative team collaborated on Faust: Seven Games of the Soul (1999), and 14 worked on The Legend of the Prophet and the Assassin (2000 – also written by Coelho). Arxel Tribe would develop fifteen games. These were mostly parts of a series sharing common aspects. They were educational adventure games set in specific historical times, inspired by real or mythological events. Arxel Tribe was eventually renamed Art Rebel and created the graphics production and modeling for French video game developer White Birds Productions.
