= The Gaze of the Gazelle =

2011 novel by Arash Hejazi

The Gaze of The Gazelle
- Author: Arash Hejazi
- Language: English
- Publisher: Seagull Books
- Publication date: 2011
- Pages: 364
- ISBN: 978-1-9064-9-790-3

The Gaze of the Gazelle is the memoir by the Persian author Arash Hejazi. This is the fourth of Hejazi's full-length novels. The Gaze of The Gazelle focuses on the political and social situation of Iran from Iranian Revolution (January 1978) until 2009–2010 Iranian election protests. The preface of this novel has been written by Paulo Coelho. The memoir was translated to German, Italian and Swedish.
