= Passage: Path of Betrayal =

2001 point-and-click adventure game

- Developer: DragonWorks Interactive
- Designer: Darris Hupp
- Platform: Windows
- Release: July, 2001
- Genre: Adventure
- Mode: Single player

Passage: Path of Betrayal is a 2D point-and-click adventure game developed and published by DragonWorks Interactive in 2001. The game was designed by Darris Hupp, a 15-year-old young man.

== Description ==
Passage: Path of Betrayal is a classic point-and-click and inventory-based adventure game, inspired by the King's Quest series.

The player takes on the role of a young man named Riff, who must protect his homeland, ArKane, from the invasion of ancient demons. Riff, along with a few trusted friends, including a wizened old "magic keeper" and a fiery young princess, will visit many diverse and mysterious lands throughout six chapters.

== Development ==
Passage: Path of Betrayal was almost entirely developed by a single person, Darris Hupp. Darris Hupp started developing the game at the age of 15 and released it when he turned 17.

== Reception ==
Reception

Review scores
Publication	Score
Just Adventure	B
Game Over Online	72%
Adventurearchiv	66%
Puntaeclicca	6.5/10
Quandary Land	3/5 stars

Game.EXE magazine dedicated a two-page article to Passage: Path of Betrayal, giving a positive review of both the game and the young developer.

Computer Games Magazine said: "It wasn't long before I cared about what happened to Riff and his family, and found joy in the whimsical characters, good dialogue, and well-developed, well-integrated puzzles. I hated to see the game end."

Just Adventure wrote: "If you have played and have fond memories of the Sierra adventure games, then Passage is definitely up your alley. If you have never solved the puzzles or traveled the imaginative worlds of Roberta Williams, then maybe Passage will serve as your invitation to research more about the rich history of adventure games.The graphics are beautiful and very colorful hand-painted pastel chalk over pencil sketches. The puzzles are masterfully constructed and follow rules of logic that are too often broken."

HappyHippo.com said: "I personally loved [the graphics]. All of the backgrounds are hand-painted using pencil and chalk and this artistic style lends itself to the game incredibly well. 4 Stars! If you're an adventure fan or like to read the occasional fantasy novel, you will certainly like Passage."

QuandaryLand.com said: "[Passage] is an engaging game and it oozes enthusiasm. I had a lot of fun fitting it all together. There are a lot of lessons here for many commercial game developers in building a story and designing puzzles that involve, challenge and entertain the player. Passage is like a trip back to the days of innocence, cute graphics, cute music, cute characters, and even a scoring system to let you know when you are doing the right thing."
