= Caravan (publishing) =

Caravan Publishing House (Persian: انتشارات کاروان, established 1997) is an Iranian publishing house which is the sole publisher of all Paulo Coelho's books in Persian and in Iran.

== Overview ==
Caravan Books Publishing House was established in 1997. Since then, Caravan has published titles in fiction and nonfiction including criticism, mythology, psychology, screenplays, poetry, correspondence, pocket books, commemoration, references, etc. In the year 2000, Caravan invited Paulo Coelho, the famous Brazilian author, to Iran. It is alleged that he was the first non-Muslim author to visit Iran after the Islamic Revolution. At the year 1991, Caravan presented the Paulo Coelho Literary Award and the next year, in collaboration with Andishesazan Publishing House, established the Yaldaa Literary Award, dedicated to fiction and literary criticism.

In 2005, Caravan Books faced an ordeal, when many of its books, especially the novel The Zahir by Paulo Coelho, were banned by the government of Iran.

In 2006, Arash Hejazi, Caravan's chief editor, was nominated to receive the IPA (International Publishers Association) Prize for Freedom of Speech.
