= The Magical Moment =

2013 book by Paulo Coelho

The Magical Moment TweetBook
- First edition
- Author: Paulo Coelho
- Original title: 마법의 순간
- Illustrator: Hwang Joong Hwan
- Language: Korean language
- Genre: TweetBook
- Publication date: 2013

The Magical Moment is a 2013 TweetBook by Brazilian author Paulo Coelho and illustrated by Hwang Joong Hwan. The book contains the core of the author's opinions accumulated over the years on Twitter.

== Illustrator ==
Joong Hwan Hwang, the illustrator of the book, is a Korean multimedia producer, journalist, and cartoonist.

== Reception ==
Seoul Shinmun liked Hwang's illustrations, praising them for complementing the text.
