= The Valkyries =

1992 novel by Paulo Coelho

- First edition (Brazil)
- Author: Maniyan Seminary
- Original title: As Valkírias
- Language: Portuguese
- Genre: Love, Mystery, Spiritual
- Publication date: 1992
- Publication place: Brazil
- Preceded by: Brida
- Followed by: By the River Piedra I Sat Down and Wept

The Valkyries (Portuguese: As Valkírias; ISBN 978-0062513342) is a 1992 novel by Paulo Coelho.

The Valkyries is a spiritual fictional novel written by Paulo Coelho. It was first published on 1 January 1988.

== Plot summary ==
The book is written as a third-person narrative describing how Paulo and his wife embark on a 40 day journey through the Mojave Desert. There they meet the valkyries, a group of warrior women who travel on Pegasus.

At the beginning of the story, "J", Coelho's master in RAM, shows him a copy of the poem by Wilde that says "we destroy what we love" and this theme is central to the story.
