= Arash Hejazi =

Arash Hejazi (Persian: آرش حجازی), born 1971 in Tehran, Iran, is an Iranian physician, novelist, fiction writer and translator of literary works from English and Portuguese into Persian. He is also an editor in Caravan Books Publishing House (Iran), and Book Fiesta Literary Magazine. He is a member of the Tehran Union of Publishers and Booksellers (TUPB) and was the managing editor of its journal, Sanat-e-Nashr (Publishing Industry), from 2006 to 2007. He was one of the nominees to receive the Freedom to Publish Prize held by International Publishers’ Association (IPA) in 2006. He is also a novel writer, whose best known novel The Princess of the Land of Eternity was shortlisted for two major Iranian literary prizes and has sold more than 20,000 copies in Iran since its first publication in 2003. He in 2009 he received his MA in Publishing from Oxford Brookes University. His dissertation on censorship in Iran was published in the publishing journal Logos in 2011, and his memoir The Gaze of the Gazelle about growing up in Iran after the Islamic Revolution was published by University of Chicago Press in 2011.

He was present at the death of Neda Agha-Soltan during the 2009 Iranian election protests, and was one of those who attempted to save her life. He lived in Tehran. Arash Hejazi is reported to have since fled Iran out of fear of government reprisals. He is now the Managing Director of IWA Publishing in the UK

== Education ==
Arash Hejazi studied medicine and his thesis was "The influences of storytelling on children's anxiety disorders".

== Works ==
=== Nonfiction ===
- The Gaze of the Gazelle: Story of a Generation (memoirs)

=== Fiction ===
He has three novels and many short stories, including:

- Only the Arrow Does Not Die, novel, Caravanserai Press, London, 2026
- The Grief of The Moon, novel, Tehran, 1994.
- The Princess of the Land of Eternity, novel, Caravan Books Publishing House, Tehran, 2004.
- Kaykhusro, novel, Caravan Books Publishing House, Tehran, 2009
- The Cave, Short story, Jashne Ketab Literary Magazine, 2003.
- The Dark Hate, Short Story, Book Fiesta Magazine, 2007.

=== Essays ===
- 'You don't deserve to be published. Book Censorship in Iran'. Logos, 22(1), 53-62.
- The influences of storytelling on children's anxiety disorders, Iran University of Medical Sciences.
- Important Factors on Determining the Print Run for Books, Publishing Industry, Tehran's Union of Publishers and Booksellers Magazine.
- Last Call for a New Blood: the disinterest of UK and US publishers towards books in translation and its implications, Oxford Brookes University, International Centre for Publishing Studies

=== Translator ===
As a literary translator, he has translated many works, from Paulo Coelho, Milan Kundera, Kahlil Gibran Lord Dunsany, etc.

== Witness of death of Neda Agha-Soltan ==
Hejazi was present at a rally held in Tehran on June 20, 2009, to protest alleged electoral fraud in the Iranian presidential elections, at which Neda Agha-Soltan was shot and killed, allegedly by a member of the Basij militia. He was among the first to respond when Neda was shot, but his attempts to save her life were unsuccessful. A non-political figure, Hejazi has spoken out, describing the events that transpired at the rally and surrounding Neda's death.

== See also ==
- List of Iranian writers
- Death of Neda Agha-Soltan
- Persian Speculative Art and Literature Award
