= Ring (video game) =

1998 video game

- Developer: Arxel Tribe
- Publishers: NA: Red Orb Entertainment; EU: Cryo Interactive
- Platforms: Windows, Mac OS
- Release: EU: October 1998; NA: July 5, 1999
- Genre: Adventure
- Mode: Single-player

Ring: The Legend of the Nibelungen, or simply Ring, is a 1998 point-and-click adventure video game for Microsoft Windows and Mac OS developed by Arxel Tribe and published in North America by Red Orb Entertainment and in Europe by Cryo Interactive. The game is based on Richard Wagner's four opera cycle Der Ring des Nibelungen, and features music from various performances of the Vienna Philharmonic Orchestra conducted by Georg Solti from 1958 to 1964, chosen in collaboration with PolyGram and Decca. French comic-book artist Philippe Druillet also worked on the game, providing much of the artwork.

The game makes a significant departure from the source material by binding the stories behind the four parts of the cycle with a surrealist science fiction background; the main plot involves a being by the name of ISH, who is guided by the voice of Erda (played by Charlotte Rampling), and who discovers the story of the Nibelungen.

Ring received largely negative reviews in North America, but was a commercial hit, with sales above 400,000 units worldwide by October 2002. In 2003, Ring was followed by a sequel, Ring II: Twilight of the Gods, which brings the cycle to an end, following the two last parts of Wagner's Ring des Nibelungen, Siegfried and Götterdämmerung. Ring II was met with similarly extremely negative reviews, and unlike the first game, was considered a commercial failure.

== Gameplay ==
The central hub in Ring

Gameplay is similar to Cryo's previous game, Atlantis: The Lost Tales. The game is played primarily from a first-person perspective which is controlled by the mouse. To speak to people or interact with objects, the player must click on them with the pointer. The pointer also controls the direction of movement. However, when ISH moves from one location to another, the game briefly switches to a pre-rendered third-person view.

The game itself is, as per the source story, divided into four levels which can be played in any order. An asteroid serves as a "hub" to the game, allowing level selection, and is also the location of the introduction sequence which presents all of the major protagonists. The game also ends on the asteroid.

== Story ==
Set in the 40th century, the game begins with the introduction of ISH, one of the last surviving humans. Humanity has been enslaved by an alien race that destroyed Earth millennia ago, and took away all creativity and creative expression, meaning humanity slowly lost all sense of its cultural history. However, ISH is given the chance to save humanity by the aliens. They present to him the story of the Nibelungen, and have him embody each of the four main characters in the hopes that his experiences will lead him to lust for power, which is what led to the downfall of humanity in the first place. However, the goddess Erda believes she can help ISH by guiding him towards rejecting the desire for power. The four characters are Alberich (a cruel and sadistic dwarf king), Loge (a fire spirit), Siegmund (the son of the god Wotan), and Brünnhilde (a Valkyrie warrior).

The story begins with Alberich arriving back in his kingdom to discover that he has very little left, nothing in the kingdom works, and his workers have formed a union and gone on strike. In order to break up the strike, Alberich must find something to satisfy the disgruntled workers, and with this aim in mind, he sets off to procure the gold of the Rhinemaidens.

The second part has the player in control of Loge. His story intertwines somewhat with that of Alberich's - in the employ of the gods, he is charged by Wotan with retrieving the Nibelungen ring and the magic crown of Wotan from Alberich.

The third section tells the story of Siegmund, son of Wotan, as he attempts to unravel the circumstances surrounding the death of his mother and sister.

The fourth section tells the story of Brünnhilde, Siegmund's half-sister, who saves him at the end of the third chapter. Her act enrages Wotan, and she is forced to flee to Valhalla where she can obtain a magic artifact to bring back to the asteroid on which the story begins - thus completing the titular "ring".

=== Differences to the original opera ===
The four individual chapters of the game refer to the first two parts of the opera cycle, Rheingold and Die Walküre, and the story is, for the most part, recognisable from its source material. However, there are several significant differences.

The most obvious alteration is the inclusion of a science fiction backstory that precedes and concludes the game. Another change is that in the opera, Siegmund is killed while fighting his sister's lover Hunding, whereas in the game he is saved by Brünnhilde. In the opera, Wotan confronts Brünhilde for saving Siegmund and confines her to eternal sleep, while in the game, she brings a magic artifact to the asteroid.

== Development ==
Ring was the second game developed by Arxel Tribe, following its 1997 title Pilgrim: Faith as a Weapon.

== Reception ==
=== Sales ===
Ring was a commercial hit. Libération reported its sales as 150,000 units by May 1999, following its launch in October 1998. According to Guillaume de Fondaumière of Arxel Tribe, it continued to sell for two years after release, which brought it to 270,000 units sold by March 2001. By October 2002, its sales had reached 400,000 units. Philippe Druillet placed Ring's lifetime sales in France near 200,000 units by 2006, and its overall sales above 450,000 units by 2007, at which time it had been released in 47 countries. Conversely, de Fondaumière reported in 2009 that it had sold more than 600,000 copies worldwide.

=== Critical reviews ===
Reception

Aggregate score
Aggregator	Score
GameRankings	40.38%

Review scores
Publication	Score
Adventure Gamers	3.5/5
GameRevolution	F
GameSpot	3.7/10
IGN	2.7/10
Next Generation	1/5
PC Gamer (UK)	41/100
PC Zone	85%
PC Gaming World	8/10
The Electric Playground	8/10

Awards
Publication	Award
EMMA Awards	Best Adventure Game (1999)
Ordinateur Individuel	Best Adventure Game (1999)

The game received mainly negative reviews. It holds an aggregate score of 40.38% on GameRankings, based on twelve reviews. Ray Ivey of Adventure Gamers wrote that it "received some of the worst reviews of any game in the late 90s." However, The Electric Playground named it one of the best adventure games of 1999. Reviews in Slovenia were more positive.

GameSpot's Ron Dulin scored the game 3.7 out of 10. While he was impressed with the graphics engine, he criticised the art design as "bland and colorless." He was especially critical of the puzzles, which he felt suffered from a lack of logic. He concluded that "There are many problems with Ring, but the greatest one is that it is so utterly uninviting. A cold world filled with uninteresting, incoherent characters, bad voice acting, puzzles involving little or no logic, and an almost absolute lack of direction all add up to create a world that is unpleasant for all but its musical accompaniment."

Daniel Erickson reviewed the PC version of the game for Next Generation, rating it one star out of five, and stated that "Even if you're a fan of adventure games, opera, and Wagner's Ring Cycle, you'll still hate Ring."

IGN's Tal Blevins scored the game 2.7 out of 10 calling it "abysmal at best." He was highly critical of the science-fiction aspect of the story, and argued that anyone not familiar with the opera would be completely lost for the majority of the game. As with GameSpot, he was critical of the puzzles, which he called "utterly ridiculous." He praised the music and sound but was critical of the graphics, and called the game "a complete travesty" and "a 10 hour CGI movie with a horribly confusing plot."

Game Revolution's Johnny Liu gave the game an F. He too was highly critical of the puzzles and the trial-and-error nature of the gameplay. He argued that playing the game could be summarised as "you watch a sequence. Then you turn around, a lot, looking for "hot spots," and then watch another sequence. It's about as involving as channel surfing." He called the graphics "pixelated crap," although he praised the art design, and concluded that "Poor Richard Wagner is probably rolling in his grave. Even if it had the graphics, without strong gameplay and logical puzzles, Ring snaps under its own weighted ambitions."

Adventure Gamers' Rey Ivey was more impressed, scoring it 3.5 out of 5. He felt that the plot of the game made little sense and was critical of the dialogue, but, unlike almost all other reviews, he praised the graphics and the puzzles, saying "the graphics are a knock-out," and lauding the unusual nature of the puzzles.

== Sequel ==
Cover art

In 2003, Ring was followed by a sequel, Ring II: Twilight of the Gods, which brings the cycle to an end, following the two last parts of Wagner's Ring des Nibelungen, Siegfried and Götterdämmerung. Ring II was met with extremely negative reviews and is considered a failure.

== See also ==
- Dracula: Resurrection
