= Alfred Hitchcock – Vertigo =

- Developer: Pendulo Studios
- Publisher: Microids
- Director: Ramón Hernáez
- Producers: Juan Miguel Martín Muñoz; Pau Farré Sereno; Rita Fortuny
- Designers: Ramón Hernáez; Josué Monchan; José Céspedes Martínez
- Programmers: Carlos Colomé García; Pepe Romero Hernández
- Artist: Alberto Lozando Domínguez
- Writers: Ramón Hernáez; Josué Monchan; José Céspedes Martínez
- Composer: Juan Miguel Martín Muñoz
- Platforms: Microsoft Windows; Nintendo Switch; PlayStation 4; PlayStation 5; Xbox One; Xbox Series X/S
- Release: Windows: WW: December 16, 2021; Switch, PS4, PS5, Xbox One, Series X/S: EU: September 27, 2022; NA: October 4, 2022
- Genre: Adventure
- Mode: Single-player

Alfred Hitchcock – Vertigo is an adventure video game developed by the Spanish company Pendulo Studios and published by Microids. It is loosely based on the films of Alfred Hitchcock, particularly Vertigo (1958). The story follows a man named Ed Miller, who enters therapy to cope with the mysterious after-effects of a car crash.

Pendulo and Microids announced Vertigo in early 2018, during the development of their game Blacksad: Under the Skin. It was first shown at the Guerrilla Collective Showcase in June 2021. The game was released for Windows via Steam, Epic Games Store, and GOG in December 2021, and was for Nintendo Switch, PlayStation 4, PlayStation 5, Xbox One, and Xbox Series X/S in September and October 2022.

== Gameplay ==
Alfred Hitchcock – Vertigo is an adventure game that takes place in a three-dimensional game world. The player controls three characters, with a focus on solving mysteries tied to flashbacks.

== Plot ==
Vertigo tells the story of Ed Miller, a writer whose life is changed by a car wreck. Although he is left mysteriously uninjured, he claims that his wife and daughter, both missing, were in the car with him. Traumatized and experiencing intense vertigo, he enters therapy in an effort to learn what happened.

== Development ==
Publisher Microids and developer Pendulo Studios first announced Vertigo in March 2018, during the production of Blacksad: Under the Skin. Rock, Paper, Shotgun reported that Microids had licensed director Alfred Hitchcock's "name and likeness", and Microids revealed that the game would be "loosely" inspired by his film Vertigo, primarily in aesthetic and theme. Pendulo disclosed in November 2020 that development of Vertigo was already "quite advanced".

The game was first shown at the Guerrilla Collective Showcase at E3 in June 2021, under the name Alfred Hitchcock – Vertigo. At the time, narrative designer Josué Monchan called the game "freely inspired" by Hitchcock's Vertigo, but noted that the film was "not our only frame of reference". He also cited the director's Spellbound, Rebecca and Psycho as influences, among others. /Film reported that the team "studied Hitchcock's camerawork (including the famous 'Vertigo shot,' or dolly zoom) and tried to lean on the aesthetic of film mysteries and thrillers".

Initially, Vertigo was set to launch across Windows and game consoles in the fourth quarter of 2021. The Windows version was released on December 16, 2021. The console versions were subsequently delayed to 2022, and were launched for Nintendo Switch, PlayStation 4, PlayStation 5, Xbox One, and Xbox Series X/S on September 27, 2022, in Europe and October 4, 2022, in North America.

== Reception ==
=== Pre-release coverage ===
Reacting to Vertigo's announcement at the Guerrilla Collective Showcase, Jeuxvideo.com named it one of the "10 indie games that caught our attention" during E3 2021. In The Guardian, columnist Stuart Heritage wrote that Vertigo "excited" him because it is a non-literal adaptation of Hitchcock's work, pointing the way to film-adapted games drawn from "a director's aesthetic rather than simply aping the nuts-and-bolts narrative".

=== Critical reception ===
Reception

Aggregate scores
Aggregator	Score
Metacritic	PC: 61/100; PS5: 64/100
OpenCritic	31% recommend

Review scores
Publication	Score
Adventure Gamers	2.5/5
HobbyConsolas	78/100
Jeuxvideo.com	13/20
The Guardian	1/5
MeriStation	7.2/10

Alfred Hitchcock – Vertigo received "mixed or average" reviews according to review aggregator website Metacritic. Fellow review aggregator OpenCritic assessed that the game received weak approval, being recommended by 31% of critics. In Rock Paper Shotgun, Kim Armstrong wrote that Vertigo is not "a bad game", but argued that it "doesn't quite stick the landing". Ouest-France was more negative, calling the game "a heartbreak" and faulting it for pacing issues, pixel hunting and poor use of quick time events.

== See also ==
- Hitchcock: The Final Cut
