= Aleph (novel) =

2011 novel by Paulo Coelho

- First edition (Portuguese, publ. Sextante)
- Author: Paulo Coelho
- Original title: O Aleph
- Language: Portuguese
- Subject: Autobiography
- Genre: Fiction, Philosophy
- Publisher: HarperCollins (eng. trans.)
- Publication date: 2011
- Publication place: Brazil
- Media type: Print (Hardcover, Paperback)
- Pages: 320 pp (Paperback)
- ISBN: 0-00-745609-3

Aleph is a 2011 novel by the Brazilian writer Paulo Coelho. An autobiographical account, it is his fourteenth major book, and touches on the theme of spirituality. Aleph was written in Coelho's native language, Portuguese.

The book tells the story of his own epiphany while on a pilgrimage through Asia in 2006 on the Trans-Siberian Railway. The title of the novel is based on Jorge Luis Borges’s short story "The Aleph", from 1945. (Aleph is the first letter of the Hebrew alphabet, with many mystical meanings.) Coelho spent four years gathering information for the book and wrote it in three weeks.

Prefacing her New York Times interview with Coelho about the novel, Julie Bosman described the author as “a Twitter mystic”. Another reviewer, while admitting the difficulty of dealing with profound concepts in a popular work, noted that “throughout the story, Coelho's tendency to describe spiritual concepts in simple terms borders on cliché”.
