= Dreams to Reality =

1997 action-adventure video game

- Developer: Cryo Interactive Entertainment
- Publishers: Cryo Interactive Entertainment (Europe); Interplay Productions (North America)
- Producer: Rémi Herbulot
- Platforms: Personal computer, PlayStation
- Release: 1997
- Genre: Action-adventure
- Mode: Single-player

Dreams to Reality is a 1997 third-person action-adventure game developed and published by Cryo Interactive. It was ported to the PlayStation under the title Dreams.

== Gameplay and plot ==
From a third-person perspective, the player navigates the game world, gathering magic powers and weapons and finding friends. Movement options include walking, flying and swimming.

Players assume the role of protagonist Duncan, and explore surreal dream worlds while attempting to stop an evil group that seeks to control subconscious reality.

== Development ==
While working on the game, producer/designer Olivier Denes commented, "The team is all gamers, but we're all different gamers, so in Dreams, you can do as you wish. I watched a woman play and she said, 'How wonderful, you can fly.' A man usually likes to pick a gun and shoot everything. We try to let people do things the way they like."

== Reception ==
While they praised the game's graphics, PC Gamer UK called the game "an unsatisfying mix of twee adventure, half-baked action" and platformer-style "running, jumping and dodging", and awarded it a score of 65/100. Meristation thought the game was highly polished, memorable, and would appeal to fans of the genre. Game.EXE gave the game a rating of 77%. Level 06 gave it a rating of 8/10. PC Powerplay deemed an "absolute stinker". Gambler Magazine gave it 65%. PC Games gave it a C.
