= The Witch of Portobello =

2006 novel by Paulo Coelho

- First Edition (Portuguese)
- Author: Paulo Coelho
- Original title: A Bruxa de Portobello
- Translator: Margaret Jull Costa
- Language: Portuguese (translated to English by Margaret Jull Costa)
- Genre: Novel
- Publisher: Planeta Group; HarperCollins, 1st US Edition (2007).
- Publication date: 2006
- Publication place: Brazil
- Media type: Print (hardback)
- Pages: 268 p.
- ISBN: 978-0-06-133880-9
- OCLC: 77758883
- Dewey Decimal: 869.3/42 22
- LC Class: PQ9698.13.O3456 B7813 2007
- Preceded by: Like the Flowing River

The Witch of Portobello (Portuguese: A Bruxa de Portobello) is a fiction work by Brazilian writer Paulo Coelho published in 2006, about a woman born in Transylvania to a Romani mother in a gypsy tribe out of wedlock. The central character is abandoned by her birth mother because the father was a foreigner (gadje) and later adopted by a wealthy Lebanese couple.

== Theme ==
In this book, Coelho works with the return to the goddess religion, the interpretation of love, and the feminine part of the Divine within the theme of searching for one’s true self and opening to the energies of the world. The question central to the story is "How do we find the courage to be true to ourselves - even if we are unsure of who we are?"

The work also expounds a selection of philosophies, which bear a certain degree of similarity to Coelho's teachings from previous novels and carry the characteristic imprint of his own ideas, as well as a citation regarding the ephemeral nature of desires, which appears in most of Coelho's novels.

The writer elucidates the opinion that the Church has deviated by its stringent rules to the point where it no longer serves Jesus Christ, or as put in his words in one of the interviews: "It's a very long time since they've allowed me in there [the Church]".

== Plot ==
As the book begins, Athena is dead. How she ended up that way creates the intrigue sustaining the book. The child, Sherine Khalil renames herself Athena after her uncle was discussing with her mother on how her real name will betray her origins and something like Athena gave nothing away. As a child, she shows a strong religious vocation and reports seeing angels and saints, which both impresses and worries her parents.

She goes into a London University to pursue Engineering at the age of 19, but it's not what her heart wanted. One day she just decides that she wanted to drop out of college, get married and have a baby. Here, the author mentions that this might be due to the fact that she was abandoned herself and wants to give all that love she could to her child which she didn't receive from her birth mother. Two years later, her marriage falls apart because they are facing too many problems due to their young age and lack of money or mostly because he felt that she loved only the child and used him to get what she wanted. A very interesting quote she uses is "From Ancient Greece on, the people who returned from battle were either dead on their shields or stronger, despite or because of their scars. It's better that way: I've lived on a battlefield since I was born, but I'm still alive and I don't need anyone to protect me." She grows into a woman in search of answers to many questions that arise within a person. She had a life which many felt was content because she had a child of her own, money, and friends; everything but her mind was at peace, so she searches for the answer to the classical question of "Who am I?" through many experiences. In her quest, she opens her heart to intoxicating powers of mother and becomes a controversial spiritual leader in London.

== See also ==
- Fictional representations of Romani people
