= Alfred Hitchcock Presents: The Final Cut =

2001 video game

- Developer: Arxel Tribe
- Publishers: Wanadoo Edition (Europe); Ubi Soft (North America)
- Platform: Microsoft Windows
- Release: EU: November 2001; NA: March 31, 2002
- Genre: Action-adventure

Alfred Hitchcock Presents: The Final Cut (also known as just Hitchcock: The Final Cut) is a 2001 action-adventure video game, in the detective-mystery genre, inspired by the films of Alfred Hitchcock.

== Gameplay ==
The Final Cut is a suspenseful adventure game that focuses on item collecting and puzzle solving as the main mechanic. However the game also bears some similarities to the survival horror actioner genre. The art design sees 3D characters be manipulated across a 2D environment. The game is interspersed with full motion videos (FMVs) to further the narrative. The controls are a combination of the keyboard and mouse. The developer Arxel Tribe says the game can be completed in 20 hours.

== Plot ==
Robert Marvin-Jones is a billionaire recluse who decides to pay homage to Alfred Hitchcock by making a film in his backyard; however his film crew have gone missing and possibly been brutally murdered. Meanwhile, private detective Joseph Shamley has psychic power. Jones' niece, a mute named Alicia, asks Shamley to use his powers of deduction to solve the mystery.

== Development ==
According to ActionTrip, "the developers bought the rights to use several famous scenes from [Hitchcock's] movies like Saboteur, Psycho and Torn Curtain in the game". Film Remakes says the game contains "extracts from six Hitchcock films (Psycho, Frenzy, Torn Curtain, Rope, Saboteur and Shadow of a Doubt)". Game Informer said that with games like Alfred Hitchcock Presents The Final Cut, Ubisoft's PC catalog is an area where the company is able to experiment and take risks.

== Reception ==
Reception

Aggregate score
Aggregator	Score
Metacritic	50/100

Review scores
Publication	Score
Adventure Gamers	1.5/5
Computer Gaming World	1.5/5
GameSpot	5.8/10
GameSpy	55%
GameZone	6.9/10
IGN	6.1/10
PC Gamer (UK)	56%
PC Gamer (US)	48%
X-Play	1/5
The Cincinnati Enquirer	3/5
The Electric Playground	6.5/10

The game received "mixed" reviews according to the review aggregation website Metacritic.

IGN wrote that the game offered "no suspense, puzzles of little interest, poor dialog, a tortuous storyline, and awkward control". ActionTrip concluded that "using Hitchcock's name and work was a good marketing move, but, unfortunately the game quality doesn't live up to it." Quandary wrote "Being an Arxel Tribe game, I was actually a bit disappointed in the figures. They are somewhat blocky and almost wooden looking." Acknowledging that "Alfred Hitchcock had sixty-seven director credits to his name before his death on April 29, 1980", GameSpy concluded that Hitchcock: The Final Cut "feels like a confusing, unworthy amalgamation of all sixty-seven Hitchcock projects". Adventure Gamers described the game as "a muddled adventure game with little inspiration, even though it pretends to be Hitchcock-inspired".

== See also ==
- Alfred Hitchcock – Vertigo
