= Mistmare =

2003 video game

- Developers: Arxel Tribe; Sinister Systems
- Publisher: Strategy First
- Engine: LithTech
- Platform: Microsoft Windows
- Release: EU: March 7, 2003; NA: July 3, 2003
- Genre: Action role-playing game
- Mode: Single-player

Mistmare is a 2003 action role-playing game co-developed by Arxel Tribe and Sinister Systems set in an alternate medieval Europe. It follows the adventures of a member of the Inquisition who is trying to stop the spread of a deadly magical fog that haunts the land. The game is known for its various bugs and high difficulty. It was one of only three games to receive a zero-star review in the Computer Gaming World magazine, along with Postal 2 and Dungeon Lords.

The story happens in an alternate 1996, where the industrial revolution never happened and Europe is covered in a monstrous fog. You play as Isidor, an inquisitor monk, who uses melee combat and sound-based liturgical magic to fight monsters and bring order back to the world.

Reception

Aggregate score
Aggregator	Score
GameRankings	28%

Review score
Publication	Score
GameSpot	1.7/10
