= Adultery (novel) =

2014 novel by Paulo Coelho

- First edition (Portuguese)
- Author: Paulo Coelho
- Original title: Adultério
- Translator: Margaret Jull Costa, Zoë Perry
- Language: Portuguese
- Genre: Fiction
- Published: August 19, 2014
- Publisher: Sextante
- Media type: Print (Hardcover)
- Pages: 272
- ISBN: 978-1-101-87408-0

Adultery (Adultério in Portuguese) is a novel by Brazilian author Paulo Coelho. It is the sixteenth major book by Coelho, and touches on the theme of adultery. The Portuguese edition of Adultery was released on April 10, 2014. The (American) English edition is published by Knopf and along with it, the Spanish edition was published on August 19, 2014. The reviewer in The Independent found the book shallow and full of cliché, while "the sex is aggressive and gratuitous".

== Plot ==
A woman in her thirties begins to question her seemingly perfect life: she is married to a rich and loving husband, has well-behaved children and a successful newspaper career. Her apathy changes when she interviews a former boyfriend, now a successful politician. They begin a passionate, high-risk and sometimes turbulent affair that leads to an obsession.
