= The Fifth Mountain =

1996 novel by Paulo Coelho

- First edition
- Author: Paulo Coelho
- Original title: O Monte Cinco
- Language: Portuguese
- Genre: Spiritual, history, Mystery, Love
- Publisher: Objetivo
- Publication date: 1996
- Publication place: Brazil
- English publication date: 1998

The Fifth Mountain (Portuguese: O Monte Cinco) is a 1996 novel by Brazilian author Paulo Coelho. It was published in English by HarperCollins in 1998. The book is author's interpretation of the story of Elijah, the old testament prophet and the tale of his trials, tribulations, and suffering all while learning about self love and his capacity to love and forgive his fellow beings.

== Plot summary ==
The story is based on the account of Biblical prophet Elijah from the Hebrew Bible (1 Kings chapters 17-19). The focus is on Elijah's time in Zarephath (in this book named Akbar). In ninth century B.C., wife to Israel's ruler Jezebel threatens to execute all prophets who refused to worship the pagan deity Baal. Elijah, a young prophet is commanded by an angel of God to flee Israel and he eventually seeks safety in the land of Zarephath. He unexpectedly falls in love with the widow to whom God sent him. But this new-found rapture is cut short and Elijah gets lost in his emotional turmoil.

Much has been added to the simple Bible story by Coelho, including Elijah witnessing the sacking of Akbar by the Assyrians, Elijah's journey up the Fifth Mountain itself (said to be the dwelling place of Baal).

For a considerable portion of the story Elijah is very compliant, obeying everything God's angels say. Eventually he realizes that his destiny is not being chosen by him but God and ultimately he decides to abide by his own desires and will.
