= The Winner Stands Alone =

2008 novel by Paulo Coelho

- First edition (Portuguese)
- Author: Paulo Coelho
- Original title: O Vencedor está Só
- Translator: Margaret Jull Costa
- Language: Portuguese
- Genre: Novel
- Publication date: 2008
- Publication place: Brazil
- Media type: Print (hardcover, paperback)
- Pages: 375 pp (paperback edition)
- ISBN: 978-0-00-731868-1
- Followed by: Amor (Love)

The Winner Stands Alone is a novel by Brazilian writer Paulo Coelho, first published in 2008 under the Portuguese title O Vencedor está Só.

The story is set at the Cannes Film Festival and roughly based upon the growing rise of what the author calls The Superclass. While the reviewer in the Financial Times admitted that the book's background was well researched, he complained that its plotting was weak and the writing over-indulgent: "Coelho alights on all the obvious clichés…and repeats them at inordinate length".

== Plot ==
The loosely connected plot tells the story of several individuals: Igor, a psychopathic Russian mobile phone mogul; Ewa, formerly Igor's wife but now married to Hamid, a Middle Eastern fashion magnate; Jasmine, an African woman on the brink of a successful modeling career; American actress Gabriela, eager to land a leading film role; and an ambitious criminal detective, hoping to resolve the case of his life. The tale narrates the tension within and between the characters in a 24-hour period.
