= Christina Oiticica =

Brazilian artist (born 1951)

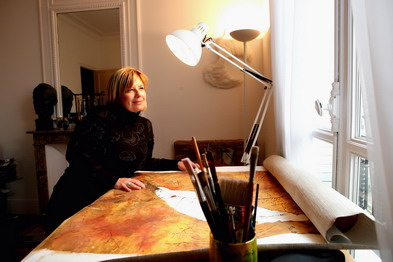
- Born: 23 November 1951 (age 74); Rio de Janeiro, Brazil
- Known for: Eco-art
- Movement: Concretism
- Spouse: Paulo Coelho (m. 1980)

Christina Oiticica (born 23 November 1951) is a Brazilian artist.

== Biography ==
She has been married to Paulo Coelho since 1980.

Oiticica is known for using an exotic neoconcretist technique that is reminiscent of both land art and eco art, a technique that allows nature’s elements to act upon her works. Oiticica is a "daughter" of the experimental art movement of the 1970s arisen in Rio de Janeiro, where she was born, and has taken her paintings all around the world.

Oiticica idealized the combination of land art – which uses nature as foundation matter – with a painting in the French Pyrenees, when she decided to paint a 10-meter long canvas in the middle of nature in the open air, as she realized not to have a covered area that would enable her to create on such surface. Once her work was finished, she left it to dry right there, outside. On the next day, as she went back to pick it up, she found that dust, dirt, leaves and some insects had been integrated to the canvas. "With no premeditation, nature had given its unique touch to the painting."

The artist began this technique painting in the forests, valleys and mountains of the Pyrenees, in France. The result of this work is her book The Four Seasons. Soon after, between 2004 and 2005, she buried many canvases in the Amazon rainforest forest in Brazil and waited a year to retrieve them. The humid and equatorial forest left their indelible marks on her paintings. In 2005, she took her work up to the Sacred Valley of Ganespura, in India.

Between 2006 and 2008, Oiticica elected the Saint James Way, a sacred and symbolic place that receives pilgrims from all over the world, as her studio. She composed her canvases at different locations along the Way, using the relief of rocks, the intervention of rain, snow, the color of the soil, natural pigments and wax. Once composed, they were "planted" on the ground and recovered months later.

Generally, Oiticica leaves her canvases "planted" for a period of nine months (the cycle of a pregnancy) or for one year (cycle of the four seasons).

== Exhibitions ==
In twenty years of artistic career, Oiticica’s works have been exhibited in more than sixty galleries in twenty countries. Among the main expositions are:

- Carrousel du Louvre – Paris, France
- Britto Central – Miami, USA
- Art Masters Festival – St Moritz, Switzerland
- Infr'action – Festival de Séte, France
- BACI Gallery – Washington, USA
- Louis Vuitton – São Paulo, Rio de Janeiro, Brazil
- 4th Visual Photographs Exhibition – Liège Biennial, Belgium.
- Mestna Gallery – Ljubljana, Slovenia
- 48th Contemporary Art Exhibition of Montrouge, France
- National Museum of Fine Arts – Rio de Janeiro, Brazil
- Oscar Wilde House – Dublin, Ireland
