= The Zahir (novel) =

2005 novel by Paulo Coelho

Zahir
- First edition (Brazil)
- Author: Paulo Coelho
- Original title: O Zahir
- Language: Portuguese
- Genre: Novel
- Publisher: Harper Perennial (eng. trans.)
- Publication date: 2005
- Publication place: Brazil
- Media type: Print (Hardcover, Paperback)
- Pages: 336 pp (Paperback)
- ISBN: 0-06-083281-9
- OCLC: 70691262

The Zahir is a 2005 novel by the Brazilian writer Paulo Coelho. As in an earlier book, The Alchemist, The Zahir is about a pilgrimage. The book touches on themes of love, loss and obsession.

The Zahir has been translated into 44 languages. The book was first published in Iran, in Persian translation, by Caravan Publishing. Iran has never signed any international copyright agreements. By being published first in Iran, the book falls under the national copyright law of Iran. This copyright measure created an unusual situation where a book is first published in a language other than the author's native language. However, the book was banned in Iran a few months after its publication, during the 18th Tehran International Book Fair.

Intended as a work of fiction, the story has strong autobiographical features, which led to an attack on the book's shallow egotism in the English press. Coelho named British war correspondent and author Christina Lamb as the inspiration for the character Esther in The Zahir.

== Plot ==
The Zahir means 'the obvious' or 'conspicuous' in Arabic. The story revolves around the life of the narrator, a bestselling novelist, and in particular his search for his missing wife, Esther. He enjoys all the privileges that money and celebrity bring. He is suspected of foul play by both the police and the press, who suspect that he may have had a role in the inexplicable disappearance of his wife from their Paris home.

As a result of this disappearance, the protagonist is forced to re-examine his own life as well as his marriage. The narrator is unable to figure out what led to Esther's disappearance. Was she abducted or had she abandoned the marriage? He encounters Mikhail, one of Esther's friends, during a book launch. He learns from Mikhail that Esther, who had been a war correspondent against the wishes of her husband (the protagonist), had left in a search for peace, as she had trouble living with her husband. The author eventually realizes that in order to find Esther he must first find his own self. Mikhail introduces him to his own beliefs and customs, his mission of spreading love by holding sessions in restaurants and meeting homeless people living in the streets. He tells the narrator about the voices he hears, and his beliefs related to them. The narrator, who only too frequently falls in love with women, consults with his current lover, Marie, about his encounters with Mikhail. She warns him that Mikhail could be an epileptic. However, she also advises him to search for the Zahir as is his desire, even though she would prefer him to stay with her.

The narrator eventually decides to go in search of his Zahir. As it was Esther who had initially brought Mikhail from Kazakhstan to France, the protagonist suspects that she may in fact be in Kazakhstan. At first, he is curious about what made Esther leave, but later he realizes that troubles in her relationship with her husband may have been a major reason. As he discovers, she was interested in getting to know herself through the making of carpets. Eventually the narrator meets his Zahir and the outcome of this meeting constitutes the climax of the book. Through the narrator's journey from Paris to Kazakhstan, Coelho explores the various meanings of love and life.

In a recurring theme in the book, Coelho compares marriage with a set of railway tracks which stay together forever but fail to come any closer. The novel is a journey from a stagnant marriage and love to the realization of unseen but ever increasing attraction between two souls.
