= The Pilgrimage =

1987 novel by Paulo Coelho

- Author: Paulo Coelho
- Original title: O Diário de Um Mago
- Language: Portuguese
- Publication date: 1987
- Publication place: Brazil
- Followed by: The Alchemist (1988)

The Pilgrimage (Portuguese: O Diário de Um Mago, "Diary of a Magus") is a 1987 novel by Brazilian novelist Paulo Coelho. It is a recollection of Paulo's experiences as he made his way across northern Spain on a pilgrimage to Santiago de Compostela. The novel serves as part adventure story, part guide to self-discovery. It was adapted into the 1997 adventure game Pilgrim: Faith as a Weapon, also written by Paulo Coelho.

== Plot summary ==
The story begins in 1986 when Coelho undertakes his initiation into the order Regnus Agnus Mundi (RAM), which he subsequently fails. He is then told that he must embark on a pilgrimage along the Camino de Santiago to find the sword that is the symbol of his acceptance into the ranks of RAM. He must do this to gain insight into the simplicity of life. The journey transforms him as he learns to understand the nature of truth through the simplicity of life.

He begins his journey with a guide, also a member of RAM, who goes by the alias Petrus. During the journey Petrus shows him meditation exercises and introduces him to some of the more down-to-earth elements of Western mystical thought and philosophy, and teaches him about love and its forms: agape, philia and eros.

== Alternative plot summary ==
A summary of the events that take place in the novel can be given, illustrating why some readers perceived the book more negatively:

A guru leads his disciple on the Camino de Santiago. They consume substantial amounts of wine and smoke a substance of unknown composition. The guru makes his disciple take part in reckless challenges (it can be noted that the disciple is 38, not a young man), claiming that creatures, such as a dog, are temporarily possessed by a demon, forcing them into these actions. The disciple is seriously injured.

The disciple interprets these questionable feats as triumphs. As they near the end of the Camino, the guru leaves his disciple, who begins hearing voices. Nevertheless, he reaches a chapel, where the guru awaits him as a surprise with a ritual sword as a reward. The disciple knows he must wield the sword frequently, though its practical use remains unclear.
