= Faust (video game) =

1999 video game

- British cover art
- Developers: Arxel Tribe; Anne Carrière Multimedia; Cryo Interactive
- Publishers: EU: Cryo Interactive; NA: DreamCatcher Interactive
- Designer: Stephen Carrière
- Engine: CINview
- Platform: Windows
- Release: October 1999
- Genre: Graphic adventure
- Mode: Single-player

Faust, known as Seven Games of the Soul in North America, is 1999 graphic adventure game created by Arxel Tribe, Anne Carrière Multimedia and Cryo Interactive. Loosely inspired by Goethe's Faust, it tells the story of Marcellus Faust and his battle of wills with the demon Mephistopheles.

Faust began development in late 1998. Designed primarily as a cultural object rather than a game, it was Arxel Tribe's second project derived from German Romantic literature, following Ring. The team's goal was to make a unique, transgressive adventure for adults, with the episodic structure of a television series such as The Twilight Zone or The Kingdom. Arxel drew inspiration from the many interpretations of the Faust legend and sought to create its own version for modern day. Faust underwent one year of development by a team of 30 people, split between France and Slovenia, and ultimately cost £700,000. Its budget was increased by the use of music licensed from Universal, including recordings by Stan Getz and Sarah Vaughan.

Although it attracted a cult fan following, Faust was a major commercial flop.

== Gameplay ==
The player stands atop an earth shelter home in Dreamland. The inventory menu has been opened and runs across the top of the screen, while the cursor rests in the lower third.

The game has generic features of post-Myst adventure games. Players pass many 360 panoramic screens, and by clicking on objects and manipulating items, they can progress through the level. The aim of each of the seven levels is to reveal secrets about the sins each person has committed. Once this is achieved, a cutscene will play and the player will commence the next level.

== Plot ==
The player assumes the role of an elderly African American man named Marcellus Faust. He finds himself in an abandoned amusement park called Dreamland where he meets a mysterious man named Mephistopheles. He explains that he and "the boss" are arguing over what should happen to seven souls, and tells you that your job is to arbitrate their cases - to look over the evidence and decide if they are guilty or innocent. Through the journeys of the seven characters, the game aims to reveal insights and observations about human nature. At the very end it is revealed that Faust is there to officiate a pact between park owner Theodore Moore and Mephisto, resulting in Theodore becoming a demon and Mephisto gaining freedom. Faust is given the chance to take over Theodore's place as the keeper of the park, or sell it.

== Development ==
Arxel Tribe began development of Faust in late 1998. The game was a collaboration between Anne Carrière Multimedia, Cryo Interactive and Arxel, and production work was split between Paris and Ljubljana, Slovenia. Stephen Carrière, son of Anne Carrière and co-founder of Arxel Tribe, served as writer and creative director of the project. Faust was devised as one entry in Cryo Interactive's series of literature- and myth-based titles, begun by the company after its success with Atlantis: The Lost Tales. Arxel's game consequently followed the series' overarching design formula, in which "the content was definitely more important than the technology", according to Cryo's Stephane Ressot. Faust co-writer Béryl Chanteux likewise argued that Arxel's goal was not to make "the game for the game": she reported that Faust's "cultural content" was its driving force. By December 1998, the title was set to launch in October 1999.

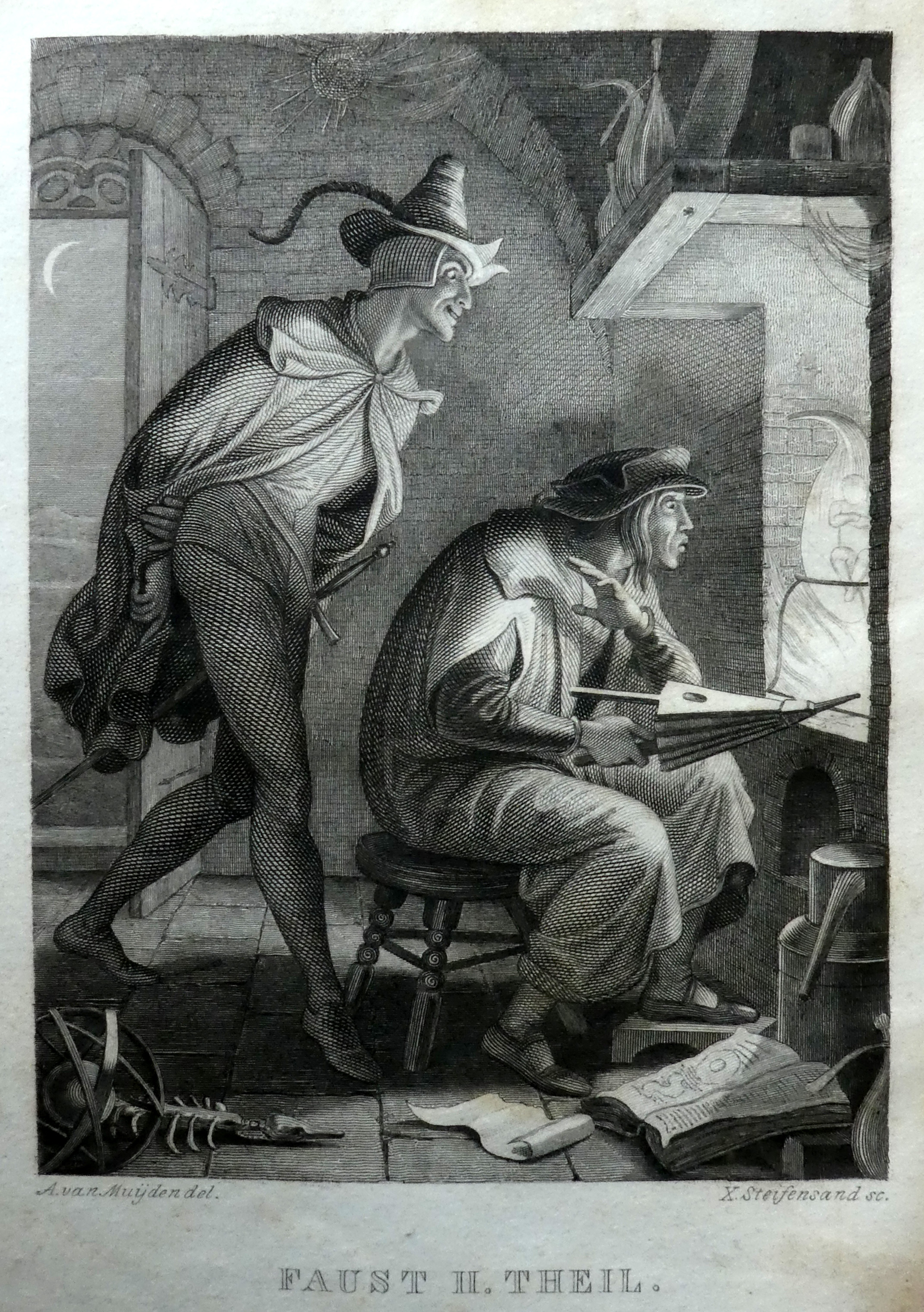
Arxel Tribe based Faust on Goethe's literary work of the same name.

Working from Johann Wolfgang von Goethe's play Faust, Arxel Tribe continued its trend of adapting the literary output of German Romanticism, in line with its Richard Wagner-inspired Ring in 1998. However, originality was a main goal for Faust. Arxel's Guillaume de Fondaumière remarked that the team sought to "stake out a new type of quest" in the gaming medium. Frédéric Dufresne of Génération 4 noted that Arxel opted for a looser style of adaptation with Faust than it had with Ring, and Carrière said that Faust's structure and core ideas were "even crazier" than those of its experimental predecessor. According to Carrière, the team drew influence from the many retellings of Faust's story, including Doctor Faustus by Thomas Mann, The Master and Margarita by Mikhail Bulgakov and The Tragical History of the Life and Death of Doctor Faustus by Christopher Marlowe. In turn, Arxel "tried to offer a new contemporary reading" of the myth that suited modern times.

Faust was built from a 100-page design document written by Carrière, which outlined the environments, characters and available actions in each scene throughout the game. The project's episodic structure was based on the model of a television series; each segment was initially meant to end with a credits sequence. By February 1999, the seven episodes of Faust were planned as the first installments in a series of 21—an episodic release format, set to continue after the game's launch, that Carrière called "a new approach of adventure". He compared the concept to The Twilight Zone and Profit, and to the miniseries The Kingdom by Lars von Trier. The results were intended for an adult audience: Carrière told Libération that Faust was written to be "a transgressive game, offbeat and ironic". Similarly, de Fondaumière said that it was an attempt to make a uniquely "anxious, disturbing" adventure unlike other games in its field. The role of Mephistopheles, portrayed as a dandy, was intentionally steeped in moral relativism. In retrospect, de Fondaumière described him as Faust's true protagonist.

The Faust team numbered above 30 members and the development cycle lasted one year, with 10 months of production. Arxel Tribe worked with the CINview engine, written by the company during its creation of Ring and Pilgrim: Faith as a Weapon, to generate Faust's rotatable 360° panoramas. The cutscenes were animated on Silicon Graphics hardware, and they employ Arxel's proprietary CINmovie technology to allow playback up to 25 frames a second. Pre-rendering was used to create most of the game's visuals. Each character in Faust began as a design on paper, which was then developed as a physical sculpture that the team digitized via 3D scanning. Thereafter, motion capture animation was applied. The final budget for Faust totaled 6.2 FF million, or around £700,000. This was a sizable cost for a French adventure game, although de Fondaumière considered it small in comparison to American titles. According to Chanteux, Faust's expenses were raised by its technology and licensed music, the latter provided by the Universal Music Group. Featuring what The Independent called "a cool jazz emphasis", the Faust soundtrack contains recordings by Sarah Vaughan, Mel Tormé and Stan Getz, among others.

Faust first launched in October 1999, on four CD-ROMs. In Sweden, it was distributed by IQ Media, with actors such as Reine Brynolfsson and Pernilla August in its voice cast. Nival handled the Russian version, brought to shelves in April 2000, while the Czech edition was released in early 2001 by Bohemia Interactive. The latter was significantly delayed by difficulties with dubbing and translation. In the United States, Faust was retitled Seven Games of the Soul and published by DreamCatcher Interactive, which launched the game on November 17, 2000.

== Reception ==
Reception

Review scores
| Publication | Score |
|---|---|
| Adventure Gamers | 4/5 |
| Computer Games Magazine | 2/5 |
| Eurogamer | 8/10 |
| GameSpot | 4.4/10 |
| GameSpy | 83/100 |
| IGN | 3.5/10 |
| Jeuxvideo.com | 14/20 |
| Just Adventure | A |

Awards
| Publication | Award |
|---|---|
| Games Domain | GD Highly Recommended |
| Eurogamer | Best Male Supporting Character |
| Game.EXE | Best Localization |
| Game.EXE | Best Scenario (tied) |

Faust failed commercially. John Walker of Rock, Paper, Shotgun wrote that the game "was an enormous flop, selling fewer than 10,000 copies". In the United Kingdom, it was among a string of bombs by Cryo Interactive: the company's entire line sold only 42,000 units in the region during 2000, which led it to cease its British publishing operations. Market research firm PC Data estimated Faust's North American retail sales during 2000 as 4,500 copies, of which 4,429 derived from December. During 2001, the firm tallied another 9,794 retail sales of the game in North America. Despite the title's poor sales, de Fondaumière was nevertheless pleased with Faust's critical reception, and he said that the game drew a cult fan following. Metacritic reported that Faust received "mixed or average reviews" from critics.

GameSpot criticised the game, writing " The real problem with Seven Games of the Soul is that it's not only nonsensical, but it's also pretentious. " IGN mirrored this view, commenting "The box for Seven Games of the Soul promises a game rich with story and immerse atmosphere an adventure that simply oozes inexplicable style and vivid imagery through exotic locations, dark mystery and quirky characters. The truth is, however, that this game makes no freakin' sense whatsoever". While questioning the contextual relevance of the musical choices, the latter site also praised Mephisto's character as being "wonderfully acted".

Adventure Gamers offered a more favourable analysis, concluding: "A philosophically ambitious game that distinguishes itself from the crowd. A rewarding experience, but expect plenty of confusion along the way", praising its "unique, complex premise; atmospheric, multi-layered mystery; high production values; excellent music; nice puzzle variety".

=== Awards ===
The editors of Eurogamer nominated Faust for their Gaming Globes 2000 awards in four categories: "Cinematography", "Adapted Storyline", "Male Lead Character" and "Male Supporting Character". Mephistopheles ultimately won the editors' choice in the final category; the other awards went variously to Outcast, Final Fantasy VIII and Indiana Jones and the Infernal Machine. In Russia, Game.EXE named Faust the best-localized game of the year, praising Nival's "fanatical professionalism" compared to other Russian game translators' loose and informal work at the time. The voice cast received similar plaudits. Game.EXE's editors also presented Faust with their "Best Scenario" award, which it shared with four other titles, including The Longest Journey.

== Legacy ==
During the first years after Faust's release, Eurogamer's John Bye recalled it as "one of the best adventure games of 1999" and a "truly excellent" title. In 2001, Guillaume de Fondaumière retrospectively told Game.EXE that Faust was "very dear to all of us" at Arxel Tribe, despite its commercial performance. Adventure Gamers later named it the 94th-best adventure game released by 2011. The site's staff lauded Faust's uniqueness and depth, and singled out its soundtrack for praise. In 2018, John Walker offered a less positive lookback at Faust, as he disliked Cryo Interactive's entire catalogue of releases. Nevertheless, he argued that Faust was somewhat superior to Cryo's and Arxel Tribe's other output, and called it "not all that dreadful."

Faust was one of many pop culture interpretations of its source material during the 1990s, including a board game (Doctor Faust) designed by Reinhold Wittig and "all manner of musical Faust adaptations", according to writer J. M. van der Laan. He grouped Arxel Tribe's Faust with other work that used Goethe's play as "window-dressing for mindless entertainments or marketing products such as lipstick, shampoo, cigars, even beer." Author Edwin Gentzler called Arxel's project part of a trend in games and comics that focused on the play's "theme of the competition between God and the Devil for Faust's soul." He noted that the Faust legend's prominence in games like Faust led to its being "culturally ingrained at a young age", among players who otherwise had no knowledge of Goethe's work.

== See also ==
- Atlantis II
- Dracula: Resurrection
- Dracula 2: The Last Sanctuary
