= Game.EXE =

Russian video game magazine

- Chief editor: Игорь Исупов (Igor Isupov)
- Categories: Video games
- Frequency: 1995 – bi-monthly 1996–2006 – monthly
- Publisher: Компьютерра (Computerra)
- First issue: March 1995
- Final issue Number: June 2006; 134
- Country: Russia
- Language: Russian
- Website: http://www.game-exe.ru/
- ISSN: 1819-2734

Game.EXE was a monthly Russian video game magazine. It was initially launched titled Toy Shop (Russian: Магазин игрушек) from March 1995 to December 1996. Starting 1997, it was renamed Game.EXE and ran until June 2006, with the last 4 issues all published in June.
