= Paulo Coelho =

Brazilian lyricist and novelist (born 1947)

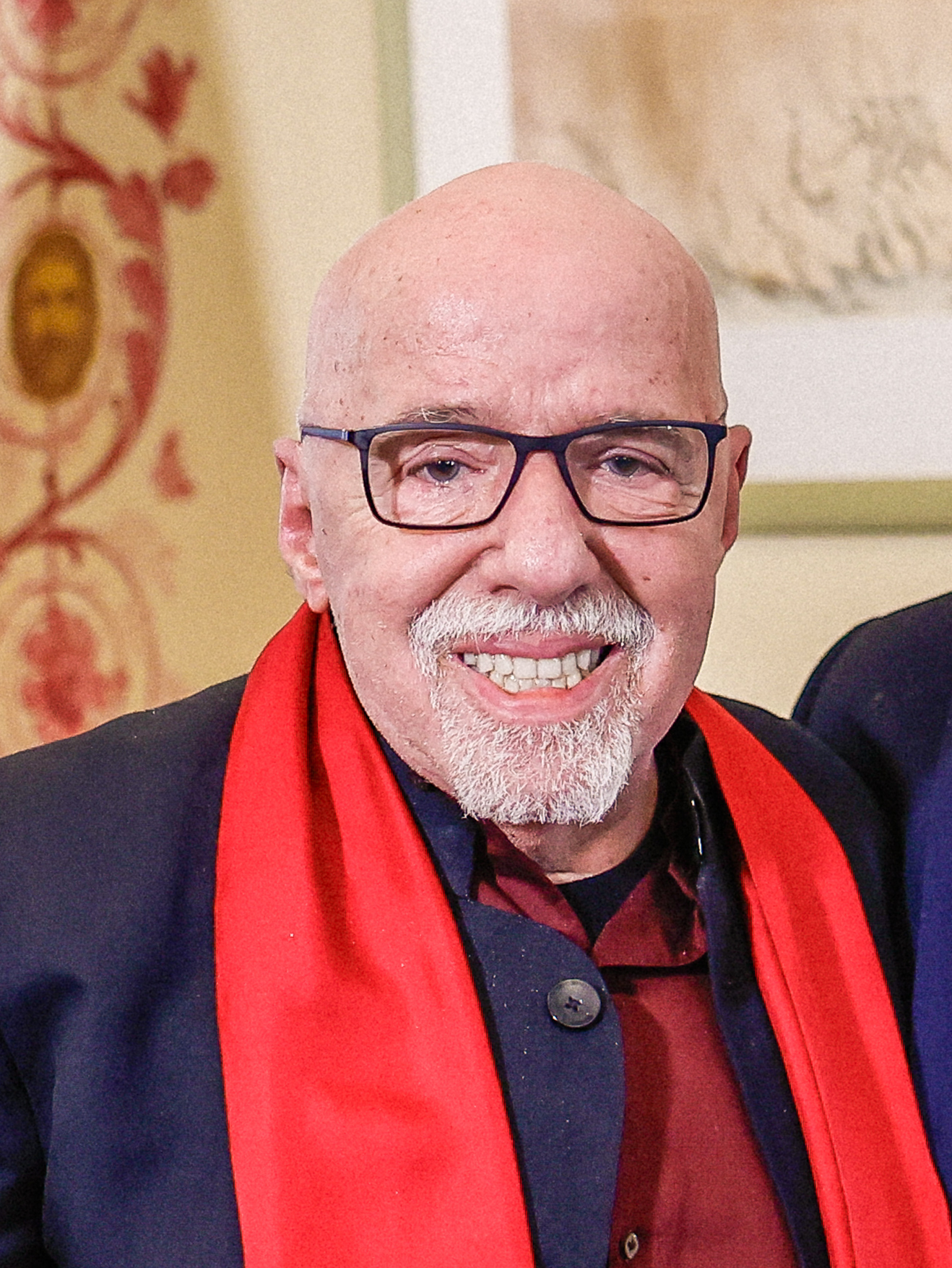
- Coelho in June 2024
- Born: Paulo Coelho de Souza; 24 August 1947 (age 79); Rio de Janeiro, Brazil
- Occupations: Lyricist; writer
- Spouse: Christina Oiticica (m. 1980)
- Writing career
- Years active: 1974–present
- Genres: Drama, romance
- Notable work: The Alchemist
- Website: paulocoelho.com

Paulo Coelho de Souza (/ˈkwɛl.juː, kuˈɛl.juː, -joʊ/ KWEL-yoo, koo-EL-yoo, -yoh, Portuguese: [ˈpawlu kuˈeʎu]; born 24 August 1947) is a Brazilian lyricist and novelist. He has been a member of the Brazilian Academy of Letters since 2002. His 1988 novel The Alchemist is an international best-seller.

== Early life ==
Paulo Coelho was born on 24 August 1947 in Rio de Janeiro, Brazil, and attended a Jesuit school. At age 17, Coelho's parents committed him to a mental institution from which he escaped three times before being released at the age of 20.

On his parents' wishes, Coelho enrolled in law school and abandoned his dream of becoming a writer. One year later, he dropped out and lived life as a hippie, travelling through South America, North Africa, Mexico, and Europe. He started using drugs in the 1960s.

== Career ==
Upon his return to Brazil, Coelho worked as a songwriter, composing lyrics for Elis Regina, Rita Lee, and Raul Seixas. In 1974, Coelho was arrested for "subversive" activities and was tortured while in custody. Coelho also worked as an actor, journalist, and theatre director before pursuing his writing career.

In 1982, Coelho published his first book, Hell Archives, which was not very successful. In 1986, he contributed to the Practical Manual of Vampirism, although he later tried to take it off the shelves since he considered it to be of poor quality. Also in 1986, Coelho walked the Camino de Santiago in northwestern Spain. Coelho later described the experience as a personal spiritual turning point. Afterwards, Coelho wrote The Pilgrimage, published in 1987.

The following year, Coelho wrote The Alchemist and published it through a small Brazilian publishing house that made an initial print run of 900 copies and decided not to reprint it. He subsequently found a bigger publishing house, and with the publication of his next book Brida, The Alchemist saw further commercial success. HarperCollins published the book in 1994. Later, it became an international bestseller. In a 2009 interview with Forward Magazine, Coelho stated that the Sufi tradition had been an influence on him, particularly when writing The Alchemist and later The Zahir.

In 2016, he was contacted by basketball player Kobe Bryant, who wanted to discuss a children's book project with him. Some months before Bryant's death in a helicopter crash in January 2020, they started to write the book together. Following Bryant's death, Coelho chose to discontinue the project.

Four of his novels – The Pilgrimage, Hippie, The Valkyries, and Aleph – are autobiographical, while the majority of the rest are fictional. Other books, like Maktub, The Manual of the Warrior of Light, and Like the Flowing River, are collections of essays, newspaper columns, or selected teachings.

== Reception ==
His work has been published in more than 170 countries and translated into eighty-three languages. His books have sold 320 million copies.

Though Coelho is a self-described Catholic, his stance has been criticized as incompatible with the Catholic faith because of its New Age, pantheist, and relativist contents. Reviews of Coelho's later work have called it superficial.

=== Film ===
The biographical film Paulo Coelho's Best Story (Não Pare na Pista) is a co-production between Brazil’s Dama Filmes and Spain's Babel Films in which younger and older versions of Coelho are played by two different actors. The film, shot in Portuguese, had its premiere in Brazilian theatres in 2014 and was internationally distributed in 2015.

== Personal life ==
Coelho married the artist Christina Oiticica in 1980. They previously spent half the year in Rio de Janeiro and the other half in a French country house in the Pyrenees, but now the couple reside in Geneva, Switzerland.

== Bibliography ==
Year	Portuguese title	English title
1974	Teatro da Educação	Theatre For Education
1982	Arquivos do Inferno	Hell Archives
1987	O Diário de um Mago	The Pilgrimage
1988	O Alquimista	The Alchemist
1990	Brida	Brida
1991	O Dom Supremo	The Supreme Gift
1992	As Valkírias	The Valkyries
1994	Maktub	Maktub
1994	Na Margem do Rio Piedra eu Sentei e Chorei	By the River Piedra I Sat Down and Wept
1996	O Monte Cinco	The Fifth Mountain
1997	Cartas de Amor de um Profeta	Love Letters from a Prophet
1997	Manual do Guerreiro da Luz	Manual of the Warrior of Light
1998	Veronika Decide Morrer	Veronika Decides to Die
1998	Palavras Essenciais	Essential Words
2000	O Demônio e a Srta. Prym	The Devil and Miss Prym
2001	Historias para Pais, Filhos e Netos	Fathers, Sons and Grandsons
2003	Onze Minutos	Eleven Minutes
2004	O Gênio e as Rosas	The Genie and the Roses
2004	Viagens	Journeys
2004	Vida	Life
2005	O Zahir	The Zahir
2005	Caminhos Recolhidos	Revived Paths
2006	Ser Como o Rio que Flui	Like the Flowing River
2006	A Bruxa de Portobello	The Witch of Portobello
2008	O Vencedor Está Só	The Winner Stands Alone
2009	Amor	Love
2010	Aleph	Aleph
2011	Fábulas	Fables
2012	Manuscrito Encontrado em Accra	Manuscript Found in Accra
2014	Adultério	Adultery
2016	A Espiã	The Spy
2018	Hippie	Hippie
2020	O Caminho do Arco	The Archer
