= Verotik =

American comic book publishing company

- Industry: Publishing
- Founded: 1994
- Founder: Glenn Danzig
- Headquarters: Los Angeles, California, U.S.
- Key people: Valarie Jones, Steven Wardlaw, Hart D. Fisher
- Products: Comic books
- Website: www.danzig-verotik.com/verotik

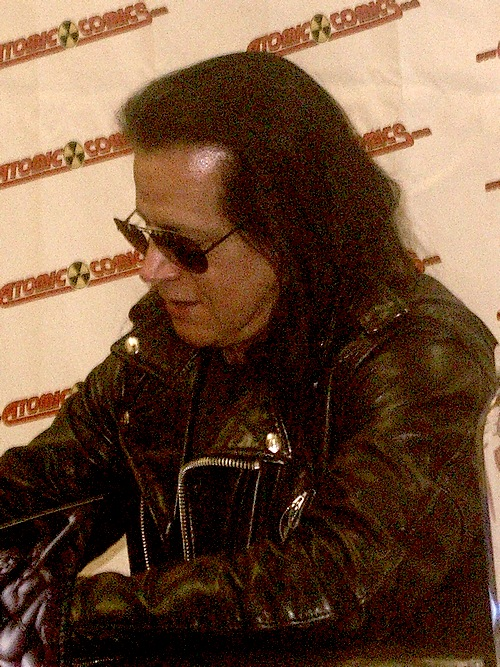
Glenn Danzig signing his book at Atomic Comics in Mesa, Arizona

Verotik is an American comic book company founded by heavy metal/horror punk musician Glenn Danzig. The comics are aimed toward adult readers as they often contain imagery of a sexual and/or violent nature.

The company's two longest-running titles are Verotika (15 issues) and Satanika vols. 1 & 2 (total of 13 issues). Verotik is known for producing variant "chase covers" for some of its titles: expensive adult-only variants depicting nudity. The company was most active in the period 1994–2001, releasing fewer new comics since 2009.

Notable creators associated with Verotik include Simon Bisley, Jae Lee, Tim Vigil, Liam Sharp, Martin Emond, Drew Posada, Jason Pearson, Shelby Robertson, Hart D. Fisher, Joe Chiodo, and Duke Mighten.

== History ==
Since childhood, Glenn Danzig had been an avid comic book collector with frustrated aspirations of being a comic book writer and artist. His fascination with horror was expressed through his music and comic books, and in August 1994 he founded Verotik (the name Verotik is a portmanteau created by Danzig from the words "violent" and "erotic").

The company was originally led by editor-in-chief Valarie Jones of the New Comics Group. Jones left at the end of 1995, succeeded by Steven Wardlaw. Writer/self-publisher Hart D. Fisher worked as an editor at Verotik in 1994–1995.

In addition to its line of original erotic horror titles, Verotik also reprinted some Golden Age comics in the period 1994–1998. They also were the first U.S. publisher to translate and publish Go Nagai's Devilman.

Verotik published Edward Lee's novel Header in 1995; the book was later adapted into a feature film.

In 1997, the Japanese animation studio Madhouse, Inc. began work on a Satanika film. The project was eventually cancelled. However, a short pilot was produced and shown at expos. The pilot was also released on a promotional VHS cassette.

The Verotik title Grub Girl, also by Edward Lee, was developed into a pornographic film of the same name in 2006, starring Brittney Skye and Eva Angelina. The movie was directed by Craven Moorehead, who would later go on to direct Danzig's music video for "Crawl Across Your Killing Floor". The soundtrack features a remix of the Danzig song "Unspeakable". Glenn Danzig is working on a movie adaptation of the Verotik title Ge Rouge, which he will also direct.

In 2019, Cleopatra Entertainment released Verotika, an anthology horror film written, directed, and scored by Danzig which is based on the company's Verotika anthology.

== Controversy ==
In 1996, Oklahoma City-based retailer Planet Comics was accused of "trafficking in obscene materials" because of selling copies of the publisher's Verotika anthology issue #4:

In March of 1996, Michael Kennedy and John Hunter closed their embattled comic book store ... after months of trials and tribulations resulting from a police raid in September of 1995. Eight weeks after the raid, eight assorted obscenity charges were filed against the owners, stemming from a complaint about Verotika #4 from a member of the Christian Coalition.... Oklahomans for Children and Families (OCaF), a non-profit obscenity watchdog group, [that pursues] enforcement of local obscenity laws, [...] turned Verotika #4 over to Oklahoma City Police. The trial was eventually set for September 8, 1997. Rather than risk imprisonment and a permanent felony record, the retailers agreed to plead guilty to the two felony charges. In exchange, they were granted a three-year deferred prison sentence and a fine of $1,500 each.

== List of titles ==
- Alphabet of Murder (1994), #1
- Albino Spider of Dajette (1997–1998), #0.5 & 1–2
- Bizo: The Intense Art of Simon Bisley (1997)
- Chiodo: Darkworks (2004); a collection of art by Joe Chiodo
- Dalkiel: The Prophecy #1
- Dark Horror of Morella (2000) (featuring art by Tim Vigil)
- Darker Horror of Morella (2001)
- Darkest Horror of Morella (2006)
- Death Dealer (1995–1997), #1–4 (art by Liam Sharp, based on the Frank Frazetta painting of the same name.)
- Drukija: Contessa of Blood (2007); prose with illustrations by Simon Bisley.
- Ge Rouge (1997–1998), 0.5 & #1–3
- G.O.T.H. (1995–1996), #1–3 (art by Liam Sharp)
- Grub Girl (1997), #1
- Igrat (1995), #1–2
- The Infernals (2017)
- Inquisitor (2002)
- Jaguar God
  - Jaguar God v1 (1996–1997), #1–7
  - Jaguar God: Illustrations (2001)
  - Jaguar God: Return to Xibalba (2003)
  - Jaguar God: Snake Brothers Revenge (2013)
- Joe Chiodo: How to Draw and Paint Pin-Ups (2006)
- Joe Chiodo: Works of Art (2003)
- Satanika vol. 1 (1995), #1–3 (art by Shelby Robertson)
- Satanika vol. 2 (1995–1999), #1–10
- Shin Devilman (1995–1996), #1–3
- Sunglasses After Dark (1995–1996), #0.5 & 1–6
- Venus Domina (1996–1997), #1–3
- Verotika (1994–1997), #1–15
- Verotik Illustrated (1997–1998), #1–3
- Verotik World (2002–2004), #1–3; (2014), #4
- WingBird
  - WingBird Special (1996), #1
  - WingBird Venus Domina San Diego Special (1996), #1
  - WingBird Returns (1997)
  - WingBird Igrat X (1997), #1
  - WinBird Akuma-She (1998)
  - WingBird Black and White Bondage Special (1998), #1
  - WingBird Girls of Verotik Sexy Pin-Ups (1999)

=== Golden Age reprints ===
- Black Angel #1 (1996) — reprints eight Black Angel stories from Hillman Periodicals' 1941 series, Air Fighters Comics
- Blue Bolt (1998) — trade paperback collection of stories from Novelty Press' Blue Bolt comics
- Phantom Lady: Crime Never Pays (1994) — reprints stories from the Phantom Lady#Fox Feature Syndicate & Star Publications series
