= Anarchy Online =

Multiplayer online role-playing game

- Developer: Funcom
- Publisher: Funcom
- Designer: Gaute Godager
- Writer: Ragnar Tørnquist
- Platform: Windows
- Release: NA: June 27, 2001; EU: September 28, 2001
- Genre: Massively multiplayer online role-playing
- Mode: Multiplayer

Anarchy Online is a massively multiplayer online role-playing game (MMORPG) published and developed by Norwegian video game development company Funcom. Released in June 2001, the game was the first in the genre to include a science-fiction setting, dynamic quests, instancing, free trials, and in-game advertising. The game's ongoing storyline revolves around the fictional desert planet Rubi-Ka, wherein a valuable mineral known as Notum is found. Players assume the role of a new colonist to Rubi-Ka. With no specific objective to win Anarchy Online, the player advances the game through the improvement of a character's skills over time. After more than 20 years, Anarchy Online has become one of the oldest surviving games in the genre.

== Plot ==
Fighting for military and political power on Rubi-Ka are the Omni-Tek corporation (who own a thousand-year lease to the planet), as well as separatist clans, terrorist groups, extraterrestrial life, and ancient civilizations. The narrative was developed to be played out as a series of virtual "role-play" events over the course of four years, influenced by the actions of those taking part in the game.

According to the game's back story, the Source is the "essence of [all] life" deep inside the planet, which created the first forms of life, who called themselves the Xan. They began as a small, perfect, immortal civilization, living in peace and harmony. The Xans' eventual discovery and research of the Source changed this. It led them to create powerful technology and a great civilization, but this made them greedy and arrogant. Two factions formed within the Xan, calling themselves the Redeemed and the Unredeemed. These groups fought over how best to use the Source—now strained and unstable from their tampering. They tried in vain to fix the problem, but discovered that they were too late, as the Source would soon destroy the planet. Rubi-Ka was ripped apart in a cataclysm, leaving it a barren rock. The Source, and small fragments of the Xans' dead civilization, were thrown into another dimension known as the Shadowlands. The survivors left in search of other habitable planets, where they planted versions of their species, and hoped that one would prosper and eventually return to Rubi-Ka. Earth was one of their destinations.

In the year 28,702 AD, a mining survey ship from the megacorporation Omni-Tek carried to Rubi-Ka the first humans to land on it. The Interstellar Confederation of Corporations (ICC) granted Omni-Tek a one thousand-year lease on the planet shortly after. It was a seemingly useless, arid landscape far from civilization, until the discovery of the mineral Notum, unique to Rubi-Ka. Research of Notum and its properties led to major leaps forward in nanotechnology, making possible the creation of powerful new technology, as well as the resurrection of the dead. After terraforming a portion of Rubi-Ka and constructing several cities, outposts, and transportation infrastructure, the company began importing colonists under contract as miners and other professions.

The first five-hundred years of Omni-Tek's control of Rubi-Ka were marked with an exemplary record of worker treatment, but as time passed, their policies degraded. Their scientists', tinkering with the mutating effects of Notum on the colonists in a quest for efficiency, led to many failed experiments. Survivors of these experiments became the game's four playable races, or "breeds", each designed by Omni-Tek to specialize in a type of work. Together with the original Solitus race, were the genetically engineered and herculean Atrox, the intelligent Nanomages, and the nimble Opifexes. They continued to labor in the midst of an increasingly hostile and totalitarian culture. This caused a significant number of workers to rebel, and begin to trade stolen Notum to a rival corporation. These rebel groups, collectively calling themselves the Clans, fought a series of wars with Omni-Tek over the next several centuries.

=== Player point of view ===
The story of Anarchy Online, from the player's perspective, begins in the year 29,475, after the most recent peace treaty between Omni-Tek and the Clans had been signed. ICC peacekeeping troops later moved into several cities to protect neutral observers of the war who had rejected their contractual obligations with Omni-Tek but did not align themselves with the Clans. Omni-Tek, the Clans, and the neutral observers form the game's three playable factions and control much of Rubi-Ka's terraformed surface.

After scientists opened a portal to the Shadowlands, players discovered the Source and killed the guardian left there by the Xan to protect it. This event prompted an alien race known as the Kyr'ozch to begin attacking Rubi-Ka. The current storyline revolves around the struggle between the factions for control of the planet.

== Gameplay ==
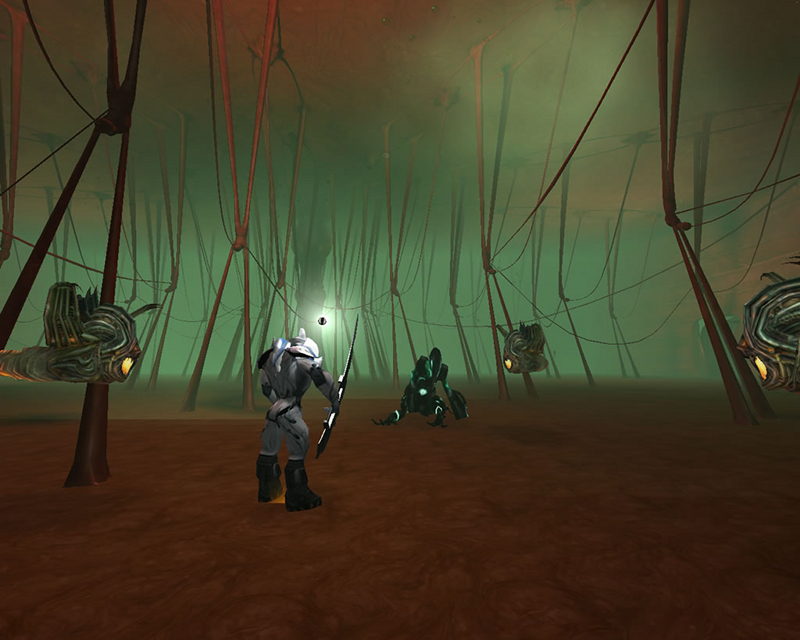
A player's character fights three computer-controlled alien enemies inside a room of an alien mothership-themed dynamic mission. Dynamic missions are a central component of Anarchy Online and each of its expansion packs.

Players assume the roles of new colonists to Rubi-Ka or the Shadowlands. The game world is occupied by human players and computer-controlled characters, both friendly and hostile. The game begins with the player creating a unique character, choosing its name, sex, height, weight, and facial features. Each character is also one of the four humanoid "breeds". The final choice is that of the character's profession, similar to the character classes of other role-playing games.

The game's multiplayer nature and "free-form" gameplay encourage creating personal networks, and cooperating and fighting with other players. Players interact with Anarchy Online's interface via a keyboard and mouse. The game's heads-up display consists of a series of windows, menus and buttons located on the periphery of the screen. Players communicate with each other by typing text in chat windows, and occasionally through emotive character animations. Communication with computer-controlled characters is executed via text windows, in which players chose from a menu of possible responses to the conversation being shown. Like most role-playing games, Anarchy Online provides structure for role-playing events, organized either by players or officially by Funcom staff. Most major cities include night clubs and other venues specifically for this.

Groups of players, large or small, are often required to complete objectives. In addition to forming teams and informal chat groups, joining a player organization is encouraged. These are, like guilds in similar games, officially recognized groups bound together for technical and social benefits. Organizations are able to build their own cities across the game world, control areas of land, run player markets, and access other special content.

Among the most distinct gameplay elements of Anarchy Online are dynamic missions. Missions, or quests, are a traditional gameplay element in the role-playing genre. The player or team is given a set of tasks—usually related to the story—to complete somewhere in the game world; in return, they are rewarded with experience points, items, and money. Dynamic missions are similar to traditional missions in purpose, but are created at the player's request. Once they choose its difficulty and other options, the game generates a new, indoor area filled with computer-controlled enemies. The player or team is told to go to its location and finish a task inside for their reward. Dynamic missions, like many other encounters in Anarchy Online, are "instanced": each mission area is available only to those assigned to it.

=== Skill system ===
Much of what characters can do, and how well they do it, is determined by the game's eighty-three distinct character skills. A skill is a numerical representation of a character's proficiency in an area of skill, starting from zero. As players kill computer-controlled enemies, they gain experience points for their character. After gaining enough points, the character levels up. The current maximum level is 220. At each new level, the character is given "skill points", which are used to increase any combination they choose of the eighty-three skills.

Any character can access and increase any skill. The character's profession, however, provides unique resources called "perks", "alien perks", "research", and "nano programs" that increase specific skill further. This makes each profession more adept at elements of gameplay than others. Doctors, for instance, can increase skills related to healing much higher than a soldier because of these additional resources. Perks are chosen from a menu when the character reaches certain levels. Alien perks are gained when the player kills enough of a specific type of alien enemy. Research is gained by diverting a percentage of earned experience points toward personal or faction-specific research projects, instead of new levels. Nano programs give temporary increases to certain skills.

=== Combat ===
After targeting another character and initiating combat, the player and their opponent will damage each other automatically with their weapons. This continues until the player stops or the target is dead. Each profession's unique nano programs, perks and research also provide combat abilities used by the player during the fight. These can heal the owner, cause additional damage, lower the skills of the enemy, blind them or otherwise hinder the enemy's ability to fight. Once the target is dead, the player is able to loot money and items from the enemy's body. After death, the character's skills are reduced for several minutes, making them much less powerful in combat during that period.

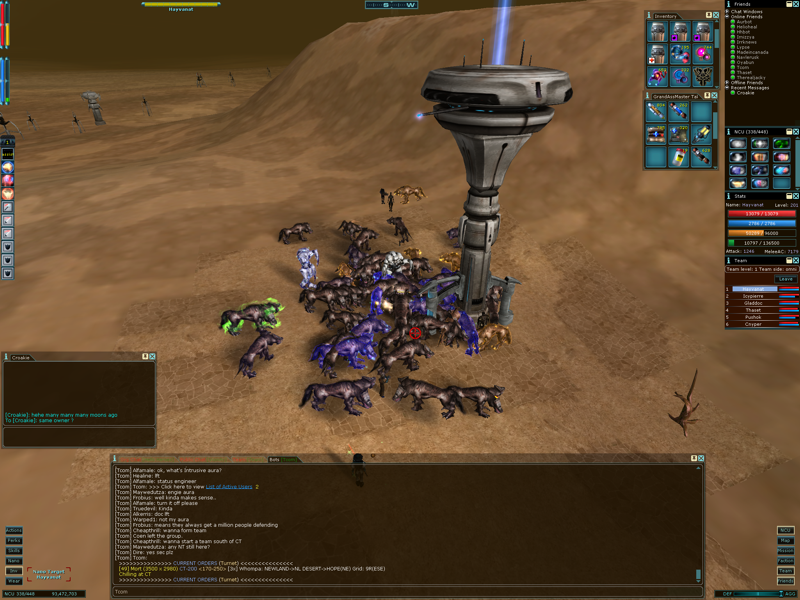
Players attack a tower at a land control area. These player vs. player encounters—introduced with the Notum Wars booster pack in 2002—require the cooperation of several players.

Combat between two or more human players, called player versus player or "PvP" is encouraged by both the reward of special equipment and the social nature of the game. Killing other players also rewards characters with a "PvP ranking", permanently shown beside the player's name, which represents how many other human players they have killed. Player versus player combat is controlled by the percentage of "suppression gas" in the area that dictates whether a player can start combat unprovoked with another player. Generally, this percentage approaches 100% in major cities, providing safe havens, and decreases while moving to more remote areas.

Combat was updated with the release of the Battlestation expansion. This allowed for a pure PvP environment where Clan and Omni players could square off in a spacestation arena, with Neutrals able to join any side. Much later, due to a declining playerbase, Clans and Omni were allowed to join teams side by side. Battlestation points were scored by capturing ("capping") up to four locations, one in the middle and three down long corridors; teleporters shortened the distance between the corridor ends. Battlestation allowed for much higher team and individual kill scores; the highest scoring team kill player of all time was Ndonaden (a doctor class Omni).

== History ==
=== Development ===
Preliminary development for Anarchy Online began in 1995 at Funcom's Oslo, Norway studios. Up until that point, the company had only developed offline video games for consoles, including the critically successful Speed Punks for the PlayStation. In a 2007 interview, former project leader Gaute Godager said Funcom's management wanted to put substantial resources into developing a new MMORPG; they believed the genre's user base would expand in the coming years. Unlike most other games in the genre, which had traditional role-playing fantasy themes, Anarchy Online featured a science-fiction theme. The game would also feature a relatively large playable area, and graphics that were, at the time, more advanced than existing MMORPGs. Godager said he and many other developers saw the idea as "crazy", describing the project as "very ambitious". The project's team grew steadily between 1995 and 2001 to include at least 70 developers.

In a 2001 interview, gameworld designer Morten Byom said that the process of creating Rubi-Ka's virtual world had "taken more time and effort than anyone imagined" when they first started. The team took inspiration from a number of sources including science-fiction books, films, architecture in Oslo, and other games in the genre. They said that one of the biggest challenges was finding ways to encourage players to use the entire game world as they play, not to "gather in one corner". Byom said that he wanted to give the world as much detail as possible to make the game "convincing" to the player.

Composers Morten Sørlie, Tor Linløkken, and Bjørn Arve Lagim created the soundtrack and music of Anarchy Online. Using a system they call "Sample-based Interactive Music", the game mixes numerous music samples to create dynamic music. By starting, stopping, fading, and layering samples based on where the player is, and what they are doing, the game creates a continuous stream of background music. Bjørn Arve Lagim said that the music is inspired by the "traditional sound" of a film score, using both orchestral and electronic instruments. Longer full-length versions of some songs were later released on compact disc with a special edition of the game in 2002.

Anarchy Online was officially announced at the 2000 Electronic Entertainment Expo (E3). GameSpot, and other online sites, published articles tracking the game's development over the next year. It made its second appearance at E3 in May 2001, one month before launch. Based on the beta version shown there, GameSpot said they were confident in the game's progress, given what they have seen. At the European Computer Trade Show in 2001 it was awarded Multiplayer Game of Show. A public beta test began two weeks before launch, during which 100,000 players downloaded and played pre-release versions of the game, helping the company find bugs and other technical problems with the software.

=== Release ===
Anarchy Online officially launched to the public on June 27, 2001, in the United States and Norway and on September 28 of the same year in the rest of Europe. In addition to being distributed as a retail box from physical and online stores, Anarchy Online was one of the first MMORPGs available via online digital distribution.

During its first month of release many stability, registration, and billing issues hurt public perception of the game. Some gaming reporters claimed it was the worst launch of an MMO in the history of the genre. Funcom spent about 6 months fixing the game, particularly the beginning experience. The company then took the "fixed game" on a press tour to convince reporters to give it another try, even though reviews and scores had been printed months before. At the same time, the company needed to build subscribers, which was very difficult given the reputation of the game. Funcom introduced the first "free trial" of the game and gave out returned boxed copies for free at the 2002 Game Developer's Conference. Some gaming publications informed their readers of the improved game, although they did not change their original scores. By the end of that year, Anarchy Online had recovered from the launch woes and won the MMO of the Year award from PC Gamer. The company went on to create expansions, including the Shadowlands expansion in 2003 that earned several Editor's Choice awards.

Two months after its release in August 2001, Funcom began offering free trial subscriptions, now common practice for other games in the MMOG genre. New players were able to sign up for accounts that remained free for a limited number of days. This required them to supply some personal information, including a credit card number. After their trial period, players could either cancel their accounts, or keep them to continue playing the game at the cost of the monthly subscription fee.

=== Expansions ===
Periodic free updates are released as content patches on an average of three per month since the game's release. These fix bugs, and add relatively small amounts of new content. The patches are downloaded and installed automatically when players start the game software. Larger updates, called expansion packs and booster packs, are available for purchase to further extend the game, typically adding new playable areas, creatures, equipment, and story progression. Expansions tend to introduce large amounts of new content; boosters are considered "too large" for a patch, but "not large enough" to warrant a full expansion.

List of Anarchy Online expansion and booster packs
Title	Year	Type	Notes
Notum Wars	2002	booster	Notum Wars was the game's first major content update in 2002. It introduced the land control areas which are now a central gameplay feature. It also added a new character creation system, flying vehicles, aesthetic improvements to the game world, and improvements to the game's rendering engine.
Shadowlands	2003	expansion	Shadowlands has been the largest expansion to date. Seven themed areas, and dozens of other new locations significantly added to the game's playable area. It raised the maximum character level from 200 to 220, and introduced the perk system. Also included were a new user interface, two new player professions, improvements to the game's rendering engine, new dynamic missions, and a "flood" of new items.
Alien Invasion	2004	expansion	Most of Alien Invasion's content centered around player organizations. "City plots" were placed throughout Rubi-Ka which organizations can buy to erect custom cities. These cities give skill bonuses, access to unique equipment, access to new dynamic missions, and venues for role-play events. It also included a new starter area—which serves as a training ground for new characters—and new user interface. The perk system was extended with the introduction of "alien experience points".
Lost Eden	2006	expansion	Lost Eden was the first expansion released after the original story had ended. It focused almost entirely on player versus player combat, although new dynamic missions were also included. The battle stations were introduced, and the pilotable vehicles for use on them and the land control areas. New weapons and armor affect skills useful against other players. It also introduced the research skill system.
Legacy of the Xan	2009	booster	Legacy of the Xan focused on "end-game" content for existing players. It added new areas, equipment, and weapons for players whose characters have reached a high level.

=== Free Play program ===
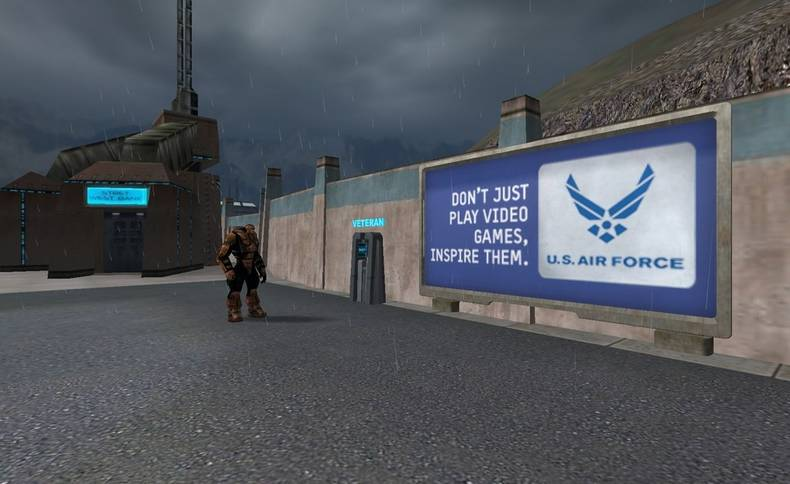
A billboard in a city controlled by the neutral faction showing an advertisement for the United States Air Force; the revenue generated by Massive Incorporated's advertising aids in keeping the game free to play.

In December 2004, Funcom replaced trial subscriptions with a business model supported by in-game advertising called the "Free Play" program. Under this program, new players are allowed indefinite access to the full original game without supplying a credit card number. With the exception of the first booster pack Notum Wars, the offer does not include access to content added with expansion or booster packs. Free subscribers are shown advertisements provided by Massive Incorporated, a company that supplies in-game advertising. The ads appear on virtual billboards placed in high traffic areas of the game world. Paying customers have the option to replace these ads with ones for fictitious products related to the game. Free subscribers may also purchase paid points to participate in micro-transactions and purchase in-game items that do not directly impact combat related gameplay.

The Free Play program was originally set to last one year, but its length has been extended every year since its creation. As of April 2020, the free to play program still exists. Former game director Craig Morrison stated in a 2008 interview that the program has been a vital part of the success of the game. In January 2008, Funcom rebranded their subscription model as a "tier subscription system", adding a third option for customers to access to the game. Customers can access the original game and Notum Wars booster pack for free via the Free Play program, pay the full monthly subscription fee for access to all expansion and booster packs, or pay a reduced monthly fee for access to only the Shadowlands expansion pack. The Shadowlands-only option was later removed.

=== Present ===
The "Free Play" program, started in 2004, allows new players indefinite access to the original game in return for viewing in-game advertisements. Vital to the game's continued operation, the program created 400,000 new subscriptions in its first ten months, and had generated US$1 million in advertising revenue by 2006.

By June 2007 Funcom began to update the game's 3D rendering engine. While the current engine — Funcom's proprietary Dreamworld — had received incremental improvements with the Notum Wars booster in 2002 and Shadowlands expansion in 2003, the 2008 announcement stated that it would be completely replaced with more modern software to "release the game fresh". Originally, a modified version of the open-source rendering engine OGRE was used. Funcom released a short video demonstrating an early version of its implementation, and said that it would be completed by the end of 2008. OGRE was dropped in May 2009 because it did not provide "the full featureset" they had anticipated. Current game director Colin Cragg revealed that Anarchy Online's "small development team" could not afford the "growing [cost] estimates" involved in making the necessary modifications to it.

Funcom decided to instead use a recent version of the Dreamworld engine, the same version used for their 2008 MMORPG Age of Conan. This new engine features improved water rendering, particle effects, and character animation. It also includes incremental improvements to technologies already used in Anarchy Online, such as the dynamic weather system. No new release date has been announced, although periodic status updates are published in the game's official weekly development blog Friday With Means.

Also introduced in 2008, Funcom added micro-transactions to the game called paid points, which may be acquired through several ways. First, players may purchase them outright via their account management page, which then becomes available to their characters in game. Alternatively, players are also awarded bonus paid points based on number of months of subscription purchased. These paid points may be used to purchase items that were given as pre-order bonuses such as a fully decor-able apartment in game, or newly created vehicles that are otherwise not available through in-game currency called credits. All items available for purchase with paid points are strictly cosmetic in nature, with the exception of a Personal Scout Mech, a combat vehicle that was a pre-order bonus for the Lost Eden expansion.

In 2010, the player community became involved in development of the game, with community-created inventory icons and planet map being accepted into the official game.

A game engine upgrade was originally slated for release in 2013. The new engine, also used for Age of Conan and The Secret World, was planned to be supported concurrently with the previous engine.

This new 'dreamworld' engine was successfully released to the public for use on the live servers on June 25, 2015. While the engine is still in a 'beta' state, it is available for use with the 'live' production servers.

=== Server mergers ===
For much of its existence, Anarchy Online featured two game servers for English-speaking players, Atlantean and Rimor, and one for German-speaking players, Die Neue Welt. In 2010, Die Neue Welt was brought offline with most of its player population distributed between the two English-speaking servers. In 2013, the two remaining English servers, Atlantean and Rimor merged to form a single unifying server to host remaining Anarchy Online players.

== Music ==
Following an innovative concept for the release time, game's music was thought to stick interactively with ingame actions, taking many parameters into account (area, faction, activity, danger, time, etc.). To accomplish this, the various musical tracks of the game were divided into 1400 sound files of 5 to 10 seconds in order to adapt in realtime to any event.

Their musical composition was done before game release and then following various extensions by several musicians: first and mainly, composers Morten Sørlie, Tor Linløkken and Bjørn Arve Lagim on classic game and then its Shadowlands expansion; a part of these works were released through two Compact Disc volumes in 2001 and 2004. Composer Leon Willett joined in for Lost Eden extension in 2006 and electro band Ayria in 2009 during the addition of the virtual club named "The Grind" accessible ingame from ICC.

All the music linked to the game, unreleased and animated series included, were gathered into a collection of 4 volumes of 56 tracks free to download (packed with all visuals to self-print CDs & booklets) through Steam for AO's 16th birthday.

== Reception ==
Reception

Aggregate scores
Aggregator	Score
GameRankings	69%
Metacritic	72/100

Review scores
Publication	Score
G4	(Alien Invasion) 4/5
GameSpot	7.6/10 (Shadowlands) 8.5/10
GameSpy	79/100 (Shadowlands) 4/5 (Alien Invasion) 3.5/5
GamesRadar+	(Lost Eden) 7/10
IGN	7.2/10 (Shadowlands) 8.8/10

After the launch of Anarchy Online and the subsequent technical problems, Funcom issued a statement to reviewers asking them to hold back on a full review until the studio solved these problems. Some video game reviewers, such as Computer Games Magazine, published reviews anyway; others, such as GameSpy who described the game as "nearly unplayable", chose to wait one month before publishing a formal review. The troubled release has had a lasting effect on the game's reputation, and is nearly always mentioned in the generally positive reviews of later expansion packs as a juxtaposition.

While Anarchy Online's launch problems had a negative effect on initial critics, the game itself was generally reviewed favorably; it scored an average of 7.6 out of 10 from GameSpy, GameSpot, and IGN. GameSpy later described it as a promising game with some big technical flaws. IGN called it a "brilliant, engaging, profound MMORPG", but added it came with "atrocious" technical problems. PC Gamer magazine said that it "will be the next great MMORPG", but that the game needed "some serious work" before it would reach its potential; they would award the game with Best Massively Multiplayer Game the next year.

Computer Games Magazine described Anarchy Online as a "'science-fiction' EverQuest" (which was a popular fantasy MMORPG at the time) in that it took the traditional fantasy elements of the genre and gave them "science-y sounding" words. They went on to praise the game's large, detailed game world, and its "evolutionary" user interface. GameSpy said the game's soundtrack was "grand, cinematic, and very appropriate" in their review. PC Gamer magazine said that the intricate skill system gave the game "incredible character depth".

The dynamic mission system was met with mixed reviews. PC Gamer called it a "brilliant" solution to camping — the practice of waiting for a computer - controlled character in the outdoor game world to appear so that it can be killed and items looted. Computer Games Magazine said that while the missions were a good idea in theory, they are "too simple and similar", claiming that this caused players to become bored and camp for items outside anyway. Visually, they called the missions "cramped, boxy, and generally unappealing", compared to the rest of the game.

The editors of PC Gamer US later named Anarchy Online the best massively multiplayer game of 2001. They wrote that after AO's abysmal launch and well-deserved public drubbing, Funcom dedicated itself to fixing the game's major problems and the result was admirable.

The first booster pack Notum Wars was released in 2002; at that time, the first expansion pack Shadowlands had already been announced. Staci Krause of IGN noted the new character creation interface made the game's introduction to new players easier. The "land control" areas, one of the major additions in Notum Wars, were described by Krause as "not only interesting, but fun". She also said that the new additions to the game world, and improvements to the 3D rendering engine, "add to the sense that Rubi-Ka is a busy planet". Yahoo! criticized the land control areas as being complicated and expensive, and said that participation in battles was difficult for players not in an organization. During the 6th Annual Interactive Achievement Awards, the Academy of Interactive Arts & Sciences nominated Notum Wars for "Massive Multiplayer/Persistent World Game of the Year".

The Shadowlands expansion was the most critically acclaimed by far, winning several Editor's Choice Awards from IGN, CNet, GameSpot, GameSpy and others in 2003. Critics applauded the size and scope of it, such as Andrew Park of GameSpot who called it "absolutely enormous". Tom Chick of GameSpy praised the "distinctive and exotic" art direction of the new areas. Critics of Shadowlands noted that the expansion's design was too "fantasy oriented", as compared to the original game.

Alien Invasion, released in 2004, did not receive the same abundance of praise as its predecessor, although most scores were above 7 out of 10. The new content it introduced, in critics' eyes, was not designed for new players. G4 TV wrote that it would be a "tough sell to new players", but added it "offer[s] existing players a solid reason to keep playing". GameSpy wrote that the expansion's new features, such as improved user interface and chat system make the game more enjoyable to play.

After twelve years, Anarchy Online has become one of the longest-running MMORPGs in operation. Publications who had reviewed the game's previous additions did not review the Lost Eden expansion in 2006, or the Legacy of The Xan booster in 2009. GamesRadar+'s Sarah Borger wrote of Lost Eden that the game's aging graphics and user interface "make the world hard to interact with", but she went on to acclaim the new player versus player content it added.

=== Sales and subscriptions ===
Five days after the game's launch, public relations director Marit Lund announced that "35,000 registered accounts" had been created. In the United States, Anarchy Online's sales reached 47,356 units by the first week of November 2001, a performance that GameSpot's Desslock described as "woeful". By 2002, the total number of subscriptions created since launch was stated as 150,000. After the release of the Shadowlands and Alien Invasion expansion packs, total subscriptions had risen to 700,000 in late 2004. Sales of the game, its expansion packs, and monthly customer subscriptions had generated US$28 million dollars by 2005.

The "free play" program, started in 2004, has had the most significant effect on subscriptions to date. More than 400,000 players signed up for free subscriptions in the program's first ten months according to Funcom CEO Trond Arne Aas. The next year, the number of free subscriptions created, independent of paid subscriptions, was stated as one million. The income from the program—which had generated $1,000,000 by its second year—supplements revenue from paid accounts.

Funcom attributed "higher than expected" company profits in 2006 to Lost Eden's release in December of that year. Subscription revenue during this time was described as "steady" and "profitable". Subscription revenue remained "steady" for the next three years, until 2009 when they were described as "slowly declining". It was said that close to two million subscriptions, both free and paid, had been created by July 2008.

== Notes and references ==
General

- "Getting Started on Rubi-Ka" (PDF). Game Guide. Funcom. Archived from the original (PDF) on April 13, 2015.

Specific
