= Death Dealer (painting) =

1973 painting by Frank Frazetta

Death Dealer (1973)

Death Dealer is a 1973 fantasy painting by American artist Frank Frazetta. It depicts a menacing armor-clad warrior with a horned helmet, whose facial features are obscured by shadow, atop a horse, holding a bloody bearded axe and shield. The image eventually led to spin-offs of varying merchandise, including subsequent paintings of the warrior, novels, statues, a comic book series published by Verotik and another by Image Comics, and related D&D adventures, published by Goodman Games.

Frazetta later painted several other Death Dealer paintings, including ones to be used as covers for the comic book series.

== In other media ==
=== Album cover ===
The painting was used as the cover on Molly Hatchet's debut album in 1978. The painting was re-drawn in a more cartoon style for Sweep the Leg Johnny's final album Going Down Swingin'.

=== Anime ===
Raoh and his horse Kokuoh from the Fist of The North Star anime and manga series are inspired by Death Dealer. One artwork featuring the two characters is directly referenced from the original Death Dealer painting.

=== Novels ===
Death Dealer spawned a novel franchise, written by author James Silke. Four novels were published, in order:

- Prisoner of the Horned Helmet (1988), in which the readers are introduced to the protagonist, who is given the name Gath of Baal. In the book he is a tribeless barbarian in a large forest that, after the end of the Ice Age, will one day become the Mediterranean sea. When the Mongol-esque Kitzaak Horde invade the forest, various parties try to recruit Gath's aid to defend against them. One of them, the beautiful sorceress Cobra, gives Gath a helmet possessed by the god of death. The helmet gives him godlike power but at the same time tries to break Gath to its will. With the help of the worldly traveling entertainer Brown John and the virtuous young woman Robin Lakehair, Gath manages to control the helmet and defeat the Kitzaak Horde.
- Lords of Destruction (1989)
- Tooth and Claw (1989)
- Plague of Knives (1990)
- Rise of the Death Dealer (2005) was an Omnibus edition containing the first two novels.

=== Statues and action figures ===
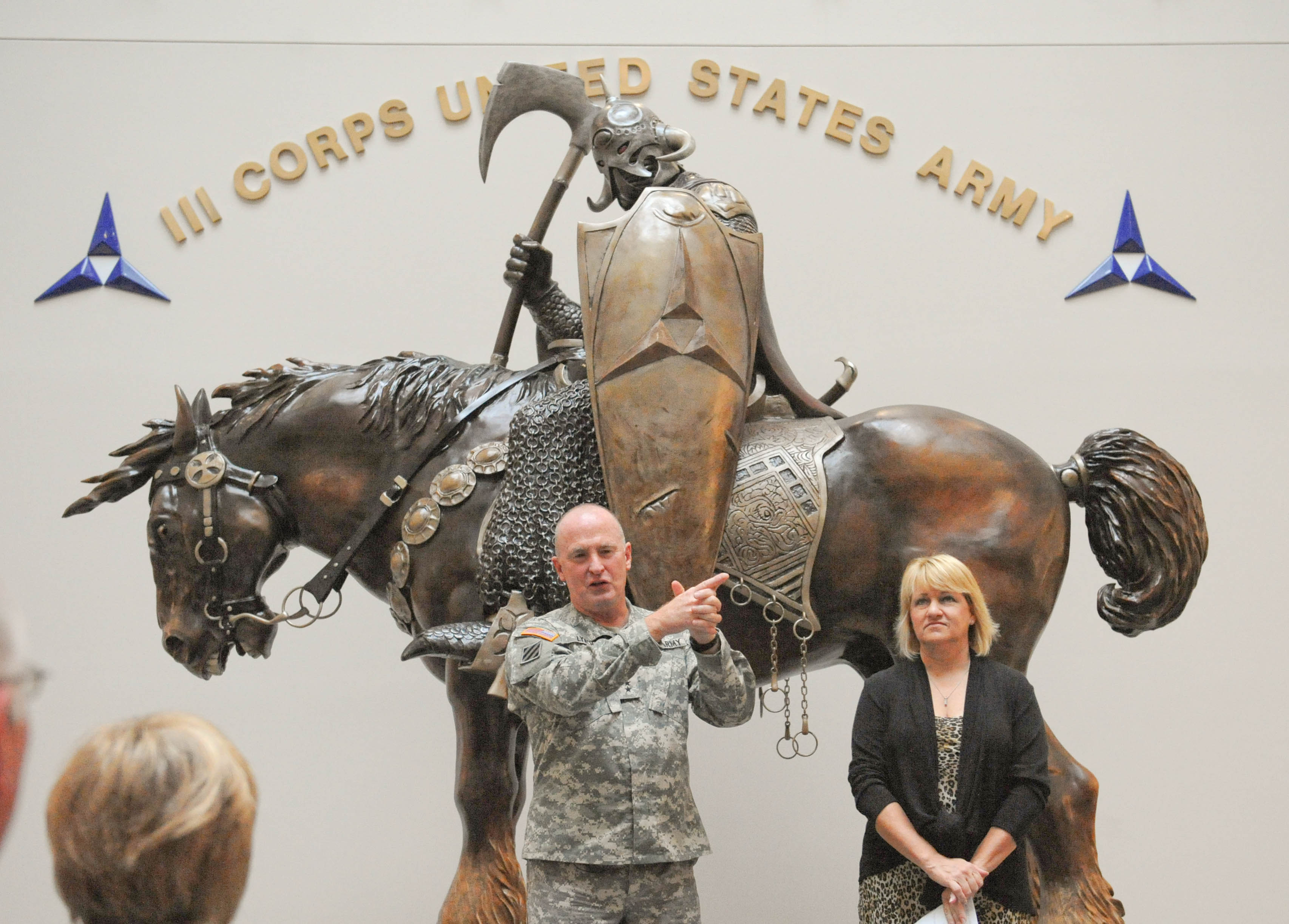
A statue of the Death Dealer is unveiled at Fort Hood, Texas.

Sculptor Randy Bowen produced the first statues based upon the character. Dark Horse Comics published several statues of the character, both full-size and miniature. Diamond Distributors published a series of Frank Frazetta action figures in the form of statues. Among the works were the original Death Dealer and one of the future renditions. Filmswords.com has created a helmet based upon that of the Dealer. Death Dealer continues to expand through the online brand, Frazetta Girls and the most recent action figure was made by Incendium Online. The Shifflet Brothers are in the process of sculpting Death Dealer based on Frazetta's artwork, titled Death Dealer II, which will be released in 2022.

=== Comic books ===
The first Death Dealer comic book series was published in 1995 by the company Verotik. The four-issue series was written by musician Glenn Danzig and illustrated by Simon Bisley (issue 1), Liam Sharp (issues 2 and 3), and by Arthur Suydam (issue 4). Frazetta provided covers for the books as well.

In 2007, Image Comics/Frazetta Comics published the Death Dealer: Shadows of Mirahan six-issue miniseries featuring Death Dealer in the first story fully approved by Frank Frazetta. The book's creators are Nat Jones, Jay Fotos, and Joshua Ortega. The story was written by Jones, Fotos and Ortega, with pencils and inks by Jones, and colors by Fotos. The story tells of an ancient land, and two warring nations fighting in an epic war. The Death Dealer appears on the field of battle and slaughters both sides. When the two kingdoms forged an alliance, the Dealer disappears for years but returns years later.

In 2022, Opus Comics published Frank Frazetta's Death Dealer written by Mitch Iverson, with pencils by Stefano Martino and colors by Luis Antonio Delgado.

=== Military ===
Since 1985, the Death Dealer has been used as the mascot of III Corps (United States). A life-size metal statue of the Death Dealer stands outside the III Corps headquarters building in Fort Hood, Texas. The statue was unveiled in September 2009 and was a nearly exact replica (except the shield) of a piece sculpted by Randy Bowen and produced by Dark Horse Comics in 2003. Two full-size painted resin statues are on display in the atriums on the III Corps Headquarters. During III Corps' 2009-2010 deployment to Camp Victory, Iraq, one of the painted resin statues was shipped and joined the unit at Al Faw Palace and was on display in the rotunda. Also, the United States Marine Corps helicopter squadron VMM-164 has the Death Dealer as their mascot.

=== Roleplaying ===
Image's Death Dealer comic inspired a series of Dungeons & Dragons adventures published by Goodman Games.

In 2009 the German publisher Bastei Lübbe gave the readers of the dime novel series Maddrax a tabletop roleplaying game. On the cover is shown the protagonist Matthew Drax as the death dealer.

The Death Dealer was used in 1991 for the cover of the French role playing game Bloodlust, set on the fantasy continent of Tanaephis. Several other Frank Frazetta's paintings were used for the various game supplements.

=== Trading card games ===
In March 2022, it was announced that the Sorcery: Contested Realm Kickstarter Alpha set would include the Death Dealer art as well as several other cards with Frank Frazetta Art. When the Alpha set was released in May 2023, the Death Dealer II art was featured on the extremely rare curio versions of the Death Dealer card. As the Frazetta art pieces were only licensed for the Alpha set, alternate art from other artists was used for the Beta printing released in November 2023.

In November 2022, Wizards of the Coast announced the Frank Frazetta Secret Lair drop for Magic: the Gathering, which featured the original Death Dealer art for Midnight Reaper and Death Dealer II for Seize the Day.

=== Video games ===
The 2018 survival game, Conan Exiles, features an undead boss enemy named "The Kinscourge": an undead warrior adorned with similarly black armor and a curved horn helmet, with glowing red eyes. As Frank Frazetta had famously worked on various Conan the Barbarian paperback covers in his career, the design of The Kinscourge is most likely an homage to Death Dealer.

=== Movies ===
The essence of the Death Dealer can be found in the animated motion picture Fire & Ice by Ralph Bakshi; both Darkwolf and Larn seek to avenge Juliana the Witch of Icepeak for destroying their homes in the Firekeep rainforest. Twice in the film, Darkwolf sits atop a horse in Death Dealer's iconic pose. Frazetta was a producer and co-writer on the film.

The antagonist Gar the Draikian in the film The Archer: Fugitive from the Empire is inspired by Death Dealer's axe-wielding image astride his horse.

Death Dealers are Vampire warriors featured in the Underworld series.

=== Precious metals ===
In 2022, the American Mint Golden State Mint added The Death Dealer design to multiple rounds in silver and copper as part of a series of rounds that pay tribute to Frank Frazetta.
