= LMO =

LMO may refer to:

== Science and technology ==
- Lanthanum manganite (LaMnO_{3}), an inorganic compound
- Lithium ion manganese oxide battery (LiMn_{2}O_{4}, etc., or LMO), a cathode material for lithium-ion batteries
- Lithium molybdate (Li_{2}MoO_{4}), an inorganic compound
- Living modified organism or genetically modified organism
- Lunar magma ocean, layer of molten rock theorized to have been present on the surface of the Moon

== Other uses ==
- Lombard language (ISO 639:1 code), of northern Italy and southern Switzerland
- RAF Lossiemouth (IATA airport code), Scotland
- LMO (album), by Rage and Lingua Mortis Orchestra
- Lego Minifigures Online, a defunct massively multiplayer video game
