= List of Devilman volumes =

The manga Devilman (デビルマン, Debiruman) was written and illustrated by Go Nagai and originally published by Kodansha from June 11, 1972 to June 24, 1973 in Shonen Magazine. The series has been published in tankōbon format several times, most of them by Kodansha (with the exception of the ebook format and some special editions). Starting the 1987 publishing, most Kodansha editions include, as part of the volumes, the manga Shin Devilman (which originally was not meant to be included in the canon of the original series).

Outside Japan, Devilman has been published in France, Hong Kong, Italy, South Korea and Taiwan. In France, it was published in 1999–2000 by Dynamic Visions, translated by Federico Colpi; in Hong Kong it has been published twice, one in 1993 and the other in 1999 and the Taiwanese edition is also available there; in Italy it has been published four times, the first time from 1991 to 1993 by Granata Press, the second time in 1996 by Dynamic Italia, the third time by d/visual from 2004 to 2005, and the last time by Jpop in 2013; and in Taiwan, it was published by d/visual taipei in 2005.

There is also a publication called Go Nagai's Devilman: The Devil's Incarnation published in 1986 by Dynamic Production for the United States. It contains chapters from the first tankōbon and it was translated by Willard Carroll with David Lewis. Seven Seas Entertainment published the English translation of the original manga in two volumes in 2018.

The Shin Devilman manga was partially released in a digitally colored version with slightly revised art in the US in 1995 by Glenn Danzig under his label Verotik under the title Devilman. The manga has also been published in Italy by d/visual where it is known as Devilman: Time Travellers.

== Volume list ==
- Kodansha (Kodansha Comics, 1972)

No.	Japanese release date	Japanese ISBN
1	October 20, 1972	406109176X
The story starts showing ancient times when demons inhabited Earth and fight each other. It then jumps to contemporary world when a group of people find demons in ice. Meanwhile, Akira Fudo, a shy and quiet high school student, is walking away from school with his friend Miki Makimura when he is harassed by some delinquents. He can do nothing when Miki is attacked but his childhood friend Ryo Asuka appears and saves them. He orders Akira to come with him and tells that his father has committed suicide pouring gasoline on himself. Ryo drives Akira his home, where he explains his father discovered the existence of demons. As they leave home, they are attacked by demons. After fighting them, they return to Ryo's house where Ryo brings Akira to his cellar. He explains his father was possessed by a demon and when he could not control himself anymore he killed himself. Ryo then tells Akira he should merge with a demon to fight them. On his cellar, Ryo reunited some hippies to attract the demons. He starts a fight and eventually they show up. Akira is able to merge with a demon called Amon and becomes "Devilman". The other day, he impresses Miki with his physical changes and beats the delinquents by himself.
2	November 25, 1972	4061091778
When rumors about Devilman spread, Sirène, the strongest demoness warrior, plans an attack against Akira. While he is in Miki Makimura's residence, she sends two demons to attack him. Akira kills the two demon minions. After that, Sirène kidnaps and immobilizes Akira, planning to take him to her superior, Lord Zennon. Ryo appears and is able to release Akira, who fights Sirène as Devilman. He almost kills her when her partner Kaim appears and they merge to fight Devilman. They almost kill him but die before because of Sirène's previous wounds.
3	April 18, 1973	4061091891
Ryo decides he and Akira should become demon hunters and he starts investigating people who suddenly changed their behavior. At school, Akira fights the delinquents once again. After defeating them, though, they are possessed by spiders released by a demon. Akira free them from the possession and they help him to fight against the rest of the possessed students. The demon flees away and Akira and Miki return home, where they are visited by a girl named Sachiko. The girl then takes a train that is attacked by Jinmen, who is a turtle-like demon that absorbs the people he kills into his shell. He tries to discourage Devilman by appealing to his humans' feelings but Akira kills him anyway. As more humans became possessed by demons, Akira realizes there must be other people like him, other Devilmen, to help him in his fight. When Lord Zennon announces three waves of attacks against humanity will start in five minutes, Ryo advises Akira not to fight.
4	July 10, 1973	4061091980
Ryo explains Akira should avoid being killed in the first wave and surprise Zennon in the next ones. However, as worldwide armies are easily defeated by the demons and a war against the United States and the Soviet Union starts, Akira decides to fight against Ryo's will. He is almost killed by the demons, but he is spared it is informed that it is Satan's will that he survives. A light sphere appears over Russia and it disintegrates everything that comes close to it and turns them into salt. Meanwhile, Japan's government researches the nature of demons and based on the studies it creates a special corp to find the demons lurking among humankind. However, this starts a war of humans against themselves. Meanwhile, Akira starts to reunite his own Devilmen army to fight back the demons.
5	September 10, 1973	4061092073
Trying to be useful in the fight against the demons, Ryo returns home to find more information about the demons. However, he discovers that the evidence he had was either fake or non-existent, and that "Ryo Asuka" died in an accident. Some demons enter the house and say they are there to meet Ryo. After that, Ryo lies about the demons' origin and reveals that Akira is a demon on a TV broadcast. Initially warry, the Makimuras retreat from attacking Akira but ask him to leave their house. Meanwhile, Akira goes after Ryo, the anti-demon special corp arrives at Makimura's residence. After talking to Ryo, Akira suspects him to be Satan but he goes after Miki's parents at the corp's headquarters. He finds both of them dead, condemning the humans who killed them as the true demons. His last hope is gone when he finds Miki was also killed by a mob who judged her to be a witch enraged he incinerates the mob. With nothing left to protect, Akira challenges Satan to the final battle between Demons and Devilmen. Both races are destroyed during the battle and Akira dies as Ryo laments killing the person he loved. God's angels then descend upon the destroyed earth.

- Kodansha (Kodansha Bunko, 1978)

Japanese release date	Vol.
December 20, 1977	1
January 30, 1978	2
February 28, 1978	3
March 31, 1978	4
April 30, 1978	5

- Kodansha (Kodansha Comics, 1983)

Japanese release date	Vol.	Japanese ISBN
July 6, 1983	1	4061010476
July 6, 1983	2	4061010484
August 6, 1983	3	4061010492

- Kodansha (1987)

Japanese release date	Vol.	Japanese ISBN
September 7, 1987	1	4061769022
September 7, 1987	2	4061769030
October 17, 1987	3	4061769049
November 17, 1987	4	4061769057
December 17, 1987	5	4061769065

- Kodansha (KC Magazine, 1993)

Japanese release date	Vol.	Japanese ISBN
December 18, 1993	1	4063194353
January 22, 1994	2	4063194361
February 23, 1994	3	406319437X
March 23, 1994	4	4063194388
April 23, 1994	5	4063194396

- Kodansha (Kodansha Bunko, 1997)

Japanese release date	Vol.	Japanese ISBN
April 11, 1997	1	4062603160
April 11, 1997	2	4062603179
April 11, 1997	3	4062603187
June 12, 1997	4	4062603195
June 12, 1997	5	4062603209

- Kodansha (Super Best KC, 2000)

Japanese release date	Vol.	Japanese ISBN
November 10, 2000	1	4063343464
December 8, 2000	2	4063343545
December 22, 2000	3	4063343596

- Kodansha (Bilingual Comics, 2002)

Japanese release date	Vol.	Japanese ISBN
September 27, 2002	1	4770027850
October 25, 2002	2	4770027869
November 21, 2002	3	4770027877
December 13, 2002	4	4770027885
January 24, 2003	5	4770027893

*This is the only edition that has been officially translated into English completely, although it was not released outside Japan. The translation was done by Jeffrey Playford.

- Kodansha (KPC, 2004)

Japanese release date	Vol.	Japanese ISBN
September 15, 2004	Devilman Tanjo (デビルマン誕生)	4063532445
October 6, 2004	Sirène tai Devilman (シレーヌ対デビルマン)	406353376X
October 27, 2004	Devilman v.s. Akuma Saishu-sen (デビルマンV．S．悪魔最終戦)	4063533921

- Kodansha (KCDX, 2008)

Japanese release date	Vol.	Japanese ISBN
January 7, 2008	Aizoban	978-4063754292
