= Winter Gold =

1996 video game

- Developer: Funcom
- Publisher: Nintendo
- Producer: Erik Gloersen
- Programmers: Frank Stevenson; Joakim Sandeberger; Olav Mørkrid; Paul Endre Endresen
- Artists: Daniel Staver; Dennis Hansen; Rune Spaans
- Composer: Jeroen Tel
- Platform: Super Nintendo Entertainment System
- Release: EU: November 28, 1996
- Genre: Sports
- Modes: Single-player, multiplayer

Winter Gold is a 1996 winter sports video game developed by Funcom and published by Nintendo for the Super Nintendo Entertainment System. In the game, players participate in six winter sports disciplines across four distinct olympic venues. Its gameplay focuses on time trials in three playable modes, using a main five-button configuration. The 3D visuals are powered by the Super FX2 chip, an enhancement of Argonaut Software's Super FX processor previously used in Doom and Yoshi's Island.

Winter Gold garnered mixed critical reception. Praise was given to the presentation, fast pacing, 3D polygon graphics, techno-style soundtrack, and controls. Some reviewers were mixed regarding the gameplay and sound design, and criticized the lack of replay value, limited color palette, and letterboxed resolution.

== Gameplay ==
The game has downhill, snowboarding, aerial skiing, bobsled, ski jumping, and luge disciplines.

Winter Gold is a winter sports game where players can choose between six disciplines such as downhill, ski jumping, snowboarding, aerial skiing, bobsled, and luge across four distinct olympic venues: Salt Lake City, Lillehammer, Albertville, and an unlockable city, Nagano. Prior to starting the game, players choose the color of their gear (suit, helmet, and boots) and nationality.

The three gameplay modes are Practice, Competition, and Circuit. In both practice and competition modes, players can choose an opponent and a few disciplines or just one discipline to participate in order to obtain the best possible time record or score, which are saved automatically via the cartridge's internal battery-backed memory. In circuit mode, the player can also participate on any discipline but must compete against other participants. The player advances into the next olympic venue by reaching the top three positions depending on the time rankings or standing points obtained after finishing each discipline. Multiplayer mode lets up to eight players compete.

In downhill, players must descend the hill as fast as possible and crossing red flag gates to avoid time penalty, while avoiding obstacles. At the starting gate, players must press left and right on the d-pad to gain initial speed. In ski jumping, players aim to achieve the longest possible jump after descending from a ramp and adjust their landing position to gain points depending on style and distance. In snowboarding, players must obtain points on a half-pipe under a strict time limit by performing tricks and combos via button combinations. Aerial skiing is similar to the snowboarding discipline but players jump from a ramp and perform a good landing. In both bobsled and luge, players must press left and right on the d-pad to gain initial speed at the starting gate and get to the bottom of the course in the fastest time possible. Players must also avoid hitting side rails to not lose speed.

== Development ==
Winter Gold was developed by Funcom and published by Nintendo for the Super Nintendo Entertainment System in November 1996. The game was housed in a 16-megabit (2 MB) cartridge using the Super FX2 enhancement chip, a revision of the Super FX processor developed by Argonaut Software that was previously used in Doom and Yoshi's Island. The FX2 chip runs at 21.4 MHz, with extra pins soldered in the PCB to increase the supported ROM size and framebuffer. Olav Mørkrid, who previously worked on Daze Before Christmas, served as lead programmer. Lead graphic artist Rune Spaans, who was hired by Funcom in 1994, was in charge of the 3D models, and co-programmers Frank Stevenson and Paul Endre Endresen were responsible for the 3D tracing and physics respectively. Additional artwork was handled by Daniel Staver and Dennis Hansen. Mørkrid and Spaans recounted the project's development process and history in a 2018 interview and on Spaans's personal website.

Mørkrid stated that Winter Gold was conceived with the working title FX Skiing by producer Erik Gloersen, who wanted to make an official Winter Olympic video game for Lillehammer but this idea did not come to fruition. He questioned Gloersen about developing a winter sports game though similar released games were not good, and Gloersen replied: "That's exactly why we're gonna make a great one". Spaans claimed that both backgrounds and video sequences were converted into vector graphics, while the sports events were animated in 3D. The introduction was created using real sportsmen. Spaans revealed that the graphics were realized with 3D Studio using DOS computers, and characters were done with Alias PowerAnimator using a SGI workstation provided by Nintendo that cost US$50,000 (equivalent to $100,200 in 2024).

Spaans said that the team wanted to avoid on-rails gameplay when developing games that are played over full motion video backgrounds such as Star Wars: Rebel Assault, so the team developed a track system enabling an infinite number of courses out of eight distinct parts and having similar frames on each sequence to use as a transition into a new track section. Spaans also stated that it was difficult merging characters into the backgrounds but Mørkrid claimed that "the game would have never been" without the involvement of Spaans, Stevenson, and Endre Endresen. Maniacs of Noise member Jeroen Tel was responsible for music and sound. Winter Gold's music is reminiscent of house music with rap and funky elements.

== Reception ==
Reception

Review scores
Publication	Score
GamesMaster	38/100
HobbyConsolas	85/100
Hyper	76%
M! Games	53%
Mega Fun	68%
Superjuegos	90/100
Total!	3-
Video Games (DE)	74%

Winter Gold received mixed critical reception. Hobby Consolas's Roberto Lorente praised the fast-paced polygon graphics, sound design, playability, and fun factor but found the color palette as not very flashy. Total!'s Frederic Berg commended the gameplay, polygon visuals, techno-style music, and sound design but criticized the lack of replay value.

MAN!AC's Martin Gaksch gave positive remarks to the funky presentation, interesting 3D polygon visuals, and fast pacing of each discipline but was mixed regarding sound and criticized the poor color palette with the same sentiment as Lorente, and the letterboxed resolution. Video Games' Thomas Wiesner regarded the fast-paced 3D graphics as very impressive for Super NES standards, innovations of each discipline, controls, music, and sound design but, like Berg, he criticized the lack of gameplay variety in Winter Gold outside of improving personal time records and competing against AI opponents. In a similar way as Lorente and Gaksch, Mega Fun's Christoph Pütz criticized the lack of colors but commended the soundtrack.
