= Lego minifigures (disambiguation) =

Lego minifigures may refer to:

- Lego minifigure, a Lego toy person
- Lego Minifigures (theme), a 2010 Lego theme
- Lego Minifigures Online, a discontinued massively multiplayer online game
