= The Park (video game) =

2015 video game

- Developer: Funcom
- Publisher: Funcom
- Director: Joel Bylos
- Artist: Gavin Whelan
- Composer: Simon Poole
- Series: The Secret World
- Engine: Unreal Engine 4
- Platforms: Windows, PlayStation 4, Xbox One, Nintendo Switch
- Release: Windows; October 27, 2015; PS4, Xbox One; May 3, 2016; Switch; October 22, 2019
- Genre: Psychological horror
- Mode: Single-player

The Park is a first-person psychological horror video game developed and published by Funcom. The game was released for Microsoft Windows via Steam and gog on October 27, 2015, and is a spin-off of an earlier Funcom game, The Secret World. It was released for PlayStation 4 and Xbox One on May 3, 2016, and Nintendo Switch on October 22, 2019. It was released in Japan on September 24, 2020. The game takes place in the Atlantic Island Park that closed in 1980 for mysterious reasons that are gradually revealed throughout the game.

== Gameplay ==
The Park is experienced from a first-person perspective as the player, Lorraine, engages with and experiences the decrepit environment of Atlantic Island Park. The game does not feature combat or enemies; Lorraine can only walk around and interact with a limited number of objects which are mainly notes that reveal the backstory of the amusement park.

Lorraine can call out to her son Callum and follow his voice to reach areas or objectives within the park, such as the rides. There are seven different rides to experience, including a dark ride and a roller coaster. The rides further the story, and provide scares. Throughout the game, Lorraine narrates her feelings and memories.

== Plot ==
The game follows Lorraine, a struggling single mother and widow with a troubled past, as she searches for her young son, Callum, who goes missing in Atlantic Island Park. Lorraine follows her son into the park just as it prepares to close for the afternoon. Nighttime comes unnaturally fast as she ascends the escalator and finds the park to be abandoned, vandalized and rundown as if several years have passed. Despite this, the rides and lights mysteriously still function. Lorraine calls for Callum and follows his voice deeper into the decrepit park.

Lorraine boards several rides which reveal the themes and backstory of the game: the Tunnel of Tales tells the story of Hansel and Gretel, ending with the two devouring the witch after cooking her. On the Ferris Wheel, Lorraine remembers Callum's father Don, a construction worker at the park who died in a fall from the Ferris Wheel when Lorraine was still pregnant with Callum. Between rides, Lorraine expresses her frustration with Callum, her belief that she is a failure as a mother, her history of mental health problems, and her fear that Callum is becoming changed by some mysterious threat. While aboard the roller coaster, a monstrous top-hatted ringmaster (identified in the credits as The Boogeyman) accosts Lorraine and claims 'the Witch' has her son.

According to notes, the park's grounds were tainted by a sinister history due to the actions of previous owner Archibald Henderson, which the new owner Mr. Winter took advantage of. Notes indicate he harvested the positive emotions of guests, and the energy he unlocked would grant him immortality. As a result, workers and employees alike experienced anxiety and a number of fatal incidents occurred. One case involved 'Chad the Chipmunk', the park's mascot. Steve, the employee wearing the chipmunk suit, refused to remove the costume and murdered a teenager with an icepick. Following Steve's arrest and the disappearance of over a dozen children inside the House of Horrors, the Park was closed permanently.

Lorraine follows Callum into the witch-faced House of Horrors, remarking on the similarity to the Hansel and Gretel story. Inside, messages from Mr. Winter reveal he retreated into the House with his machines when the Park closed, still hoping to achieve immortality. The interior of the House changes to a loop of Lorraine and Callum's home through time. It is revealed that Lorraine's father abused and abducted her as a child, and that she suffered from depression when Callum was born and was given electroshock therapy. Each version of her house becomes more decrepit and disturbing. At the end, she finds a message by Mr. Winter revealing he needs children for his harvesting machines, and has already kidnapped and killed at least one. The notes, combined with depictions of Winter in a similar ringmaster's garb and top hat, suggest he is the Boogeyman haunting the grounds.

Lorraine reveals that in the oldest versions of the Hansel and Gretel story, the cruel mother and the Witch were the same person, and she believes she is the real Witch - apparently accepting that her neglect of Callum indirectly caused his disappearance. She reaches Callum, lying unconscious on a slab. Chad the Chipmunk appears behind her, then is replaced by the Boogeyman, who forces a bloody icepick into her hands, guides her hands above Callum's chest and allows her to stab him in the heart.

After, Lorraine sits grief-stricken in a police station interrogation room. A detective identical to the Park gatekeeper enters, carrying a jar with a bee in it, and tells her to think of the last place she saw her son. Lorraine narrates that, in her heart and mind, she will always return to Atlantic Island Park. Ultimately, though the game's supernatural elements are confirmed by Lorraine's appearance in The Secret World, it's left ambiguous how much of The Park was real or imaginary.

== Development ==
The Park was announced by Funcom on August 26, 2015. According to Funcom's Rui Casais, the games' development began as an experiment by a small team. The team hoped to utilize the worlds from their previous massively multiplayer online games, and reshape them into some smaller single-player games. According to Casasis, it was "creatively energising" for the team to work on a new single-player game as their last game with a single-player focus was Dreamfall: The Longest Journey in 2006. The game's universe is based on 2012's The Secret World.

The game was announced for PlayStation 4 and Xbox One in November 2015. Funcom later announced that the console versions will be released on May 3, 2016, making it the first Funcom game developed for consoles since Dreamfall in 2006.

== Reception ==
Reception

Aggregate score
Aggregator	Score
Metacritic	PC: 67/100; PS4: 55/100; XONE: 61/100

The game holds a rating of 67 out of 100 on Metacritic based on 25 reviews, indicating "mixed or average reviews".
