= Grub Girl =

- Cover art for Grub Girl
- Directed by: Craven Moorehead
- Based on: Grub Girl by Edward Lee
- Starring: GiGi; Teanna Kai; Eva Angelina; Brittney Skye; Charmane Star
- Edited by: J-Jeans
- Production companies: Verotik; Moorehead Productions
- Distributed by: Northstar Associates
- Release date: February 7, 2006 (United States)
- Running time: 80 minutes
- Country: United States
- Language: English

Grub Girl is 2006 American pornographic horror film. It is an adaptation of the Verotik comic book of the same name by Edward Lee.

== Plot ==
At an unspecified point in the future, the government create a type of jet which never needs refuelling but which leaks a type of radiation causing those exposed to it to die and reanimate as intelligent zombies dubbed "Grubs". One of the victims of the radiation is a sex worker whose scarred body is taken to a laboratory, where she wakes up while being sexually abused by a pair of necrophilic scientists, whom she kills on account of having given her "the worst fuck of my life".

"Grub Girl" adjusts to being a zombie and returns to being a sex worker, discovering that being undead is advantageous to her career, as she is immune to disease and nearly impervious to pain. One night, after making a house call to a married couple, Grub Girl is accosted by her pimp, Rome, who forces her to fellate him in an alley. Sick of Rome's abuse, Grub Girl bites off his penis then rips out and devours his innards.

With Rome gone, Grub Girl becomes a madam and opens a brothel that specializes in Grubs. One customer of the establishment is a bisexual married woman, whom Grub Girl sets up with a pair of her girls, upon whom the customer uses a strap-on dildo. The film ends with Grub Girl propositioning the prospective customer she had been telling her story to, before breaking the fourth wall by snarking, "Okay, don't act like you've never thought about it before. Why else would you be watching this crummy movie? Now beat it, unless you're throwing some green my way".

== Cast ==
- Brittney Skye as Grub Girl
- Charmane Star as Grub Hooker #1
- Teanna Kai as Brothel Customer
- Eva Angelina as Grub Hooker #2
- GiGi as The John's Wife
- Talon as Scientist #2
- Kurt Lockwood as The John

== Production ==
The film was originally slated to be produced and distributed by Hustler Video, though Verotik founder Glenn Danzig instead went with Craven Moorehead and Northstar Associates after watching videos Moorehead had directed for pornographer Peter North.

== Reception ==
A four out of five was given to Grub Girl by AVN, which wrote that it was "damn true to the storyline of the original" and that "those who like the macabre will definitely find lots to like". X Rent DVD awarded a four and a half out of five and found that "Craven Moorehead does a good job of capturing the campy 1970's style horror flick flavor with the dark lighting and the costuming and make-up that made the girls look dead but still hot", and "It will definitely be entertaining for those that are looking for something different, especially if you are a fan of the old school horror movies".

In the article "The 10 Least Horrifying Horror Movies Ever" written for Esquire, Sean Cunningham listed Grub Girl as runner-up, behind Leprechaun: Back 2 tha Hood.

=== AVN Award Nominations ===
The film was nominated for "Best Video Feature", and Brittney Skye for "Best Actress, Video" at the 2007 AVN Awards.
