= Nat Jones =

American film and comic book artist (born 1976)

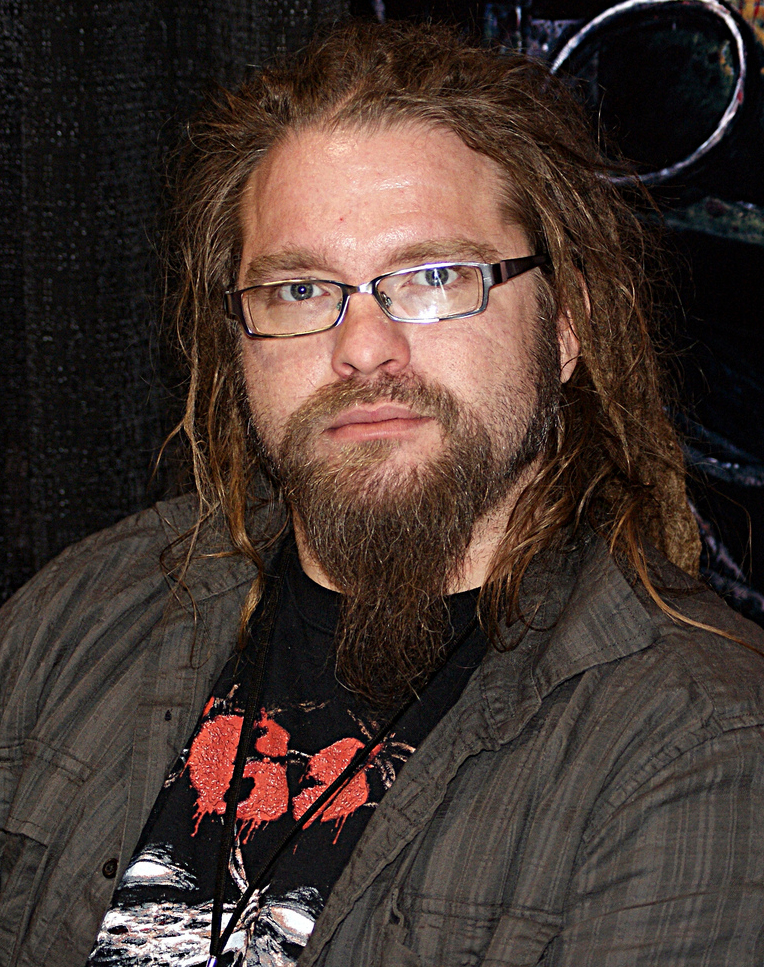
- Jones in June 2011
- Born: July 24, 1976 (age 50) Greenville, South Carolina, U.S.
- Areas: Writer, Penciller, Inker
- Notable works: Spawn; Death Dealer '68; Rob Zombie's The Nail

Nat Jones (born July 24, 1976) is an American artist working primarily in comic books and film. Jones is best known for his work on Frank Frazetta's Death Dealer.

== Bibliography ==
=== Artist ===
- Crypt of Dawn (1996)
- The Crow / Razor: Kill the Pain (1998)
- Supermodels in the Rainforest (1998)
- Sirius Gallery (1999)
- Spawn: The Dark Ages (with Steve Niles, Image Comics, 2000–2001)
- Lady Death: Swimsuit 2001 (2001)
- The Haunted (2002)
- Rob Zombie's The Nail (written by Steve Niles and Rob Zombie, Dark Horse Comics, 2004)
- Spawn (Image Comics, 2004)
- 30 Days of Night 2005 Annual: The Journal of John Ikos (IDW Publishing, 2005)
- Doomed (IDW Publishing, 2005)
- Giant Monster (with Steve Niles, 2-issue prestige format mini-series, Boom! Studios, 2005)
- Fear the Dead: A Zombie Survivor's Journal (Boom! Studios, 2006)
- 30 Days of Night Three Tales (IDW Publishing, 2006)
- Frank Frazetta's Death Dealer (Image Comics, 2007)
- The Tripper (Image Comics, 2007)
- '68 (2007, 2011 with Mark Kidwell and Jay Fotos, Image Comics, 2006, 2011)
- 28 Days Later: The Aftermath (with Steve Niles, Fox Atomic Comics, 2007)
- The Unusual Suspects (Image Comics, 2007)
- HOPE: New Orleans (2007)
- Kodiak (written by Joe Hill, IDW Publishing, 2010)
- Wulf (with Steve Niles, Atlas Comics, 2011)
- Broken Moon (American Gothic Press, 2016 to present)

=== Writer ===
- Frank Frazetta's Death Dealer (Image Comics, 2007)
- The Tripper (Image Comics, 2007)

=== Cover artist ===
- Parts Unknown: Hostile Takeover (2000)
- Fused! (2002)
- The Haunted (2002)
- Giant Monster (2005)
- 30 Days of Night 2005 Annual: The Journal of John Ikos (IDW Publishing, 2005)
- Jazan Wild's Carnival of Souls (2005)
- Red Sonja (2005)
- 30 Days of Night: Spreading the Disease (IDW Publishing, 2006)
- Jazan Wild's Carnival of Souls (2006)
- Kade: Sun of Perdition (2006)
- Fear the Dead: A Zombie Survivor's Journal (Boom! Studios, 2006)
- Frank Frazetta's Death Dealer (Image Comics, 2007)
- '68 (Image Comics, 2007)
- The Tripper (with David Arquette and Joe Harris, Image Comics, 2007)
- Frank Frazetta's Creatures (Image Comics, 2008)
- Frank Frazetta's Dark Kingdom (Image Comics, 2008)
- Big Badz (2008)
- Frank Frazetta's Swamp Demon (Image Comics, 2008)
- Frank Frazetta's Dracula Meets The Wolfman (Image Comics, 2008)
- Frank Frazetta's Freedom (Image Comics, 2009)
- Frank Frazetta's Moon Maid (Image Comics, 2009)
- Frank Frazetta's Neanderthal (Image Comics, 2009)
- Frank Frazetta's Sorcerer (Image Comics, 2009)
- Salem's Daughter (2009)
- Kodiak (written by Joe Hill, IDW Publishing, 2010)
- Wulf (with Steve Niles, Atlas Comics, 2011)
- Dark Souls (Titan Comics, 2016)
- Rue Morgue Magazine (2016)
- Pestilence (Aftershock Comics, 2017)
- Baby Teeth (Aftershock Comics, 2017)
- Dark Ark (Aftershock Comics, 2017)

=== Colorist ===
- HOPE: New Orleans (2007)

=== Instructor ===
- Guru Digital Arts College (2011)

=== Art director ===
- Baldur's Gate: Enhanced Edition (2013)
