= Oklahomans for Children and Families =

Organization that lobbies against offensive media

- Predecessor: Oklahomans Against Pornography
- Formation: 1984; 42 years ago
- Type: Nonprofit organization
- Legal status: Defunct
- Purpose: To lobby against media that the group finds offensive
- Headquarters: United States
- Key people: Paul Wesselhoft

Oklahomans for Children and Families (OCAF) is a nonprofit organization that lobbies against media that the group finds offensive. The group has targeted bookstores, libraries, and comic book shops to stop the distribution of books and magazines it calls pornographic.

OCAF is best known for its lobbying of Congress for passage of the Telecommunications Act of 1996, demanding that internet service providers stop offering Usenet newsgroups which contain sexual content. OCAF is also the subject of the documentary Banned In Oklahoma (2004) about the organizations efforts, ultimately unsuccessful, to remove the movie The Tin Drum from Oklahoma libraries and movie rental businesses, 18 years after the film's release.

== History ==
The group was founded in 1984 as Oklahomans Against Pornography in an effort to force Oklahoma-based cable television companies to remove Playboy TV from their line-ups.

In 1996, the group accused an Oklahoma City comic book store of "trafficking in obscene materials" because it was selling copies of publisher Verotik's Verotika anthology issue #4:

In March of 1996, Michael Kennedy and John Hunter closed their embattled comic book store ... after months of trials and tribulations resulting from a police raid in September of 1995. Eight weeks after the raid, eight assorted obscenity charges were filed against the owners, stemming from a complaint about Verotika #4 from a member of the Christian Coalition.... Oklahomans for Children and Families [...] turned Verotika #4 over to Oklahoma City Police. The trial was eventually set for September 8, 1997. Rather than risk imprisonment and a permanent felony record, the retailers agreed to plead guilty to the two felony charges. In exchange, they were granted a three-year deferred prison sentence and a fine of $1,500 each.

OCAF is currently defunct. One of OCAF's leaders, Paul Wesselhoft, is now a member of the Oklahoma state government for Moore, Oklahoma. He continues promoting a religious right agenda.
