= Funcom =

Norwegian video game developer and publisher

Funcom Oslo AS
- Formerly: Funcom N.V. (1993–2005); Funcom Productions AS (2005–2017)
- Type: Subsidiary
- Industry: Video games
- Founded: 1993; 33 years ago
- Founder: Erik Gloersen; Tyr Neilsen; Andre Backen; Gaute Godager; Olav Mørkrid
- Headquarters: Oslo, Norway
- Number of locations: 5 (2021)
- Key people: Rui Casais (CEO)
- Products: The Longest Journey; Anarchy Online; Dreamfall; Age of Conan; The Secret World; Conan Exiles
- Revenue: ▲US$33.776 million (2018)
- Operating income: ▲US$10.166 million (2018)
- Net income: ▲US$6.618 million (2018)
- Number of employees: 450+ (2024)
- Parent: Tencent (2020–present)
- Divisions: Funcom Inc.; Funcom SE
- Subsidiaries: The Outsiders; Cabinet Group
- Website: funcom.com

Funcom Oslo AS (formerly Funcom N.V. and Funcom Productions AS) is a Norwegian video game developer and publisher that specializes in online games. It is best known for the massively multiplayer online role-playing game (MMORPG) titles Conan Exiles, Age of Conan, Anarchy Online, The Secret World – and The Longest Journey series of adventure games. The company has offices in Oslo, Norway; North Carolina, US; Lisbon, Portugal; Bucharest, Romania; and Stockholm, Sweden. It also had offices in Beijing, Dublin, and Montreal previously. It is now owned by the Chinese media conglomerate Tencent.

== History ==
Founded in 1993 by Erik Gloersen, Tyr Neilsen, Andre Backen, Gaute Godager and Olav Mørkrid, the company started as an independent game developer and publisher. It focuses mainly on PC games but have also released games on other platforms, including mobile phones and tablets. Funcom's console releases includes titles on Sega Mega Drive/Genesis, Super NES, Sega Saturn, Xbox, Xbox One and PS4.

In 1994, Funcom Dublin was set up to concentrate on console games. It originally had 20 employees. By July 2000, this had grown to 25. With the parent company choosing to focus on a massive multiplayer online title, Anarchy Online, the decision was made to close this subsidiary in August 2001. Funcom Dublin is known for developing Speed Freaks.

In late 2000s, Funcom opened a new office in North Carolina, increasing its staff to handle the final stages of releasing its sci-fi online RPG, Anarchy Online. The new location was also chosen so that it could offer effective customer service to North American players.

In December 2005, Funcom N.V. (OSE: FUNCOM), the Dutch parent company of Funcom Oslo, was listed on the Oslo Stock Exchange.

On March 14, 2007, the company abandoned traditional physical product distribution (e.g., on optical discs) in favor of digital distribution completely. The main reason for this decision was claimed to be the financial losses due to software piracy.

On August 21, 2008, Funcom laid off half of its customer service department located in Durham, North Carolina. On November 22, 2008, third parties reported that Funcom fired an additional 70% of the staff in its US workforce, possibly endangering future releases.

On September 17, 2008, Gaute Godager left Funcom, stating he was dissatisfied with certain elements of Age of Conan, which he directed. Craig Morrison took over the direction of Age of Conan.

On February 23, 2009, Funcom reported financial losses of approximately $23 million in the fourth quarter of 2008. The unsuccessful launch of Age of Conan was cited as the reason for such a steep decline. The chief analyst of DnB NOR, Fredrik Thoresen, estimated that 100,000 subscribers played the game at the time of the report, far below the publisher's expectations, though these numbers were not confirmed by Funcom itself.

On September 1, 2009, Funcom announced the establishment of a new development studio in Montreal, Quebec, Canada. The new studio has worked on Funcom's two MMORPG projects: The Secret World and the Age of Conan expansion pack Rise of the Godslayer.

On September 29, 2009, Funcom announced a reduction of 20% of its staff, resulting in a "significant delay" for the release of The Secret World.

All the perceived actions were reflected in the 2010 Annual Financial Report. The current number of employees is 282 (a 19% reduction to 2009). As the result of the new strategy, the operating results came close to a positive value — in 2010 it reached — US$593 thousand compared to — US$10 798 thousand in 2009.

On July 2, 2012, Funcom announced Ole Schreiner as the new CEO of Funcom and as a new member of the management board of Funcom. Ole Schreiner comes from the position of COO of the company, a role he has held for several years. Ole Schreiner is one of Funcom's longest-serving employees and he has been working directly with titles such as Anarchy Online, Age of Conan and The Secret World in several capacities. Trond Arne Aas, long-term CEO of Funcom, took on a new role as Strategic Advisor to the Board and Chief Strategy Officer.

On August 22, 2012, Funcom announced that it laid off half of the company as a cost-adjustment initiative due to the poor performance of its MMORPG The Secret World. Some of the lay-offs were temporary. They blamed this poor performance on the Metacritic score of the game and the launch of competing titles like Diablo III.

On January 10, 2013, Funcom announced that it had initiated a process of restructuring the company around its core products and technology. The restructuring involved, among other things, that some of the company's offices would be closed or consolidated with others. Thus, Funcom hoped to create a stronger and more effective organization. The company announced on January 17, 2013, that it would lay off some of its staff of its Montreal branch as a part of the restructuring process.

On January 29, 2014, Norwegian economic crime unit Økokrim launched an investigation into suspected infringement of the provisions of the Securities Trading Act connected to the 2012 launch of The Secret World. In October 2015, the case against Funcom was closed after the company paid a fine.

On April 24, 2014, the company reported securing NOK 9.7 million (US$1.6 million) additional equity. The additional cash boost helped the company to fully prepare for the launch of the LEGO Minifigures MMO in summer 2014.

In May 2015, Rui Casais takes on the CEO role at Funcom, after a 7 years tenure as Chief Technology Officer. His career at Funcom started in 2004 when Casais joined as a Junior AI programmer and 10 years later became the CEO. During this time, he helped to develop and implement features and tools for all parts of game development, facilitated operational matters, developed partnerships and created long-term business strategies that contributed to the company's success.

In October 2015, the company launched The Park, a single-player horror experience based on The Secret World intellectual property.

In December 2015, the company announced that it had entered into a partnership agreement with Conan Properties International LLC, making it the preferred partner for PC and console games based on the Conan the Barbarian brand.

In January 2016, the company announced it was working on Conan Exiles, an open-world survival game based on the Conan the Barbarian brand. The game released on Steam PC Early Access on January 31, 2017, and launched on the Xbox One as part of the Game Preview program in August 2017.

In March 2017, the company announced it would relaunch The Secret World as Secret World Legends, the free-to-play reboot of the original 2012 MMORPG. It launched June 2017, and was made available on Steam in July 2017. There have been no substantial updates to the game since October 2018.

In August 2017, the company revealed a new logo and branding alongside a positioning that openly acknowledges low points in the company's history.

On 8 January 2019, it was announced that Funcom had acquired 50.1% of the Lisbon, Portugal-based company Zona Paradoxal, Lda ("ZPX") with whom it has had a working relationship since 2017.

On 26 February 2019, Funcom announced that it was entering into an exclusive partnership with Legendary Entertainment to develop games related to the upcoming Dune films.

Tencent Holdings acquired a 29% minority stake in Funcom in September 2019, making it the largest shareholder in the company. Tencent announced in January 2020 its intent to fully acquire Funcom through purchasing all outstanding shares of the company in February 2020 valued at US$148 million. The acquisition was completed in July 2020.

In June 2021, Funcom acquired Swedish video game developer The Outsiders, while the company also announced plans to open a new studio in Romania. The company's newest office, Funcom Bucharest, opened in September and serves for the moment as the company's headquarters for quality assurance, with plans in place to expand to other areas of game development over time.

Funcom acquired Cabinet Group, which owns the intellectual property rights of Conan, Mutant, and Solomon Kane and other works based on the writings of Robert E. Howard, in September 2021. Funcom stated that with this acquisition, that alongside a new game, it planned to merge these into a new studio Heroic Signatures and release a new game based on these properties. On December 2, 2021, it was announced that it signed an agreement with NUKKLEAR for assistance on Funcom's upcoming Dune survival video game.

In October 2025, it was announced that The Outsiders was being shut down by Funcom.

== Portfolio ==
The Longest Journey was produced by Ragnar Tørnquist and was very well-received both by critics and users. The game was published in 9 languages: English, Norwegian, French, Dutch, Swedish, Italian, Polish, Russian and Spanish. The game was also released in other countries, but mainly in English-speaking ones.

Anarchy Online is a critically acclaimed online game, more specifically a massively multiplayer online role-playing game (MMORPG), with 20 international awards. Funcom issued several expansions: The Notum Wars, Shadowlands, Alien Invasion, Lost Eden and Legacy of The Xan. Founder Gaute Godager was the first Game Director, before Marius Enge released Alien Invasion and took over at the release of Shadowlands. However, shortly after the release of Alien Invasion, Morten Byom took over. Later, near the release of the Lost Eden expansion, Byom moved on to the Age of Conan team, and was succeeded as Game Director by Craig Morrison, also known as "Silirrion". Following the game, a book about the prehistory of the planet and a CD with music from the game were released.

In the spring of 2006, the company released the sequel to The Longest Journey for the Xbox and PC, entitled Dreamfall.

Funcom has also developed an online action role-playing video game for PC and console entitled Age of Conan: Hyborian Adventures. This product utilizes the Conan the Cimmerian franchise license. The PC version of this game was released on May 20, 2008, and the Xbox 360 version was cancelled. As of 2011, the subscription model of the game has been altered to a hybrid game is marketed as Age of Conan: Unchained. Funcom released an expansion pack for the game called Age of Conan: Rise of the Godslayer.

The development of its MMO The Secret World was announced on May 11, 2007, and the game was released on July 3, 2012.

Funcom earned a license from the Lego Company to develop a new MMO game, titled Lego Minifigures Online. The game is child friendly and was originally intended to be free-to-play, but released with a buy-to-play model on June 29, 2015.

On October 27, 2015, Funcom released a single-player horror title, The Park, set in the same universe setting as its MMO, The Secret World.

On October 25, 2016, Funcom released the one vs. one multiplayer game Hide and Shriek, set in the same universe as its MMO The Secret World.

On January 31, 2017, Funcom released an online survival sandbox game Conan Exiles, set in the Conan the Cimmerian franchise, as an early access title on PC. It was later released on the Xbox One as part of the Game Preview program on August 16, 2017.

On June 26, 2017, Funcom re-launched The Secret World as Secret World Legends, a free-to-play rebuild of the original 2012 MMORPG. It became available on Steam July 31, 2017.

Survival game Conan Exiles, developed by Funcom Oslo, launched on 8 May 2018.

On March 1, 2022, Funcom publishes Mighty Kingdom's Conan Chop Chop, a party rogue-lite game for 1-4 players available on PC, Nintendo Switch, PlayStation 4, and Xbox One. One month later, on April 26, Funcom also publishes Dune: Spice Wars, a real-time strategy 4X title from developer Shiro Games, on Steam Early Access.

On September 1, 2022, Metal: Hellsinger, the heavy metal rhythm FPS from publisher Funcom and developer The Outsiders became available on PC, PlayStation 5, and Xbox X/S, and, later on, on PlayStation 4.

== List of games ==
=== Games developed ===
| Title | Release | Genre | Platforms | Notes |
|---|---|---|---|---|
| A Dinosaur's Tale | 1993 | Adventure | Sega Genesis | |
| Daze Before Christmas | 1994 | Action | Sega Genesis, Super NES | |
| Fatal Fury Special | 1995 | Fighting | Sega CD | Ported by Funcom |
| Samurai Shodown | 1995 | Fighting | Sega CD | Ported by Funcom |
| Disney's Pocahontas | 1996 | Adventure | Sega Genesis | |
| Nightmare Circus | 1996 | Action | Sega Genesis | |
| Winter Gold | 1996 | Sports | Super NES | |
| DragonHeart: Fire & Steel | 1996 | Action | PlayStation, Sega Saturn, Windows | |
| Impact Racing | 1996 | Racing | PlayStation, Sega Saturn | Developed by Funcom Dublin |
| Casper | 1996 | Puzzle adventure | Sega Saturn | |
| NBA Hangtime | 1996 | Sports | Sega Genesis, Super NES | Port of Arcade game |
| Speed Freaks | 1999 | Racing | PlayStation | Developed by Funcom Dublin |
| The Longest Journey | 1999 | Adventure | Windows | |
| Championship Motocross featuring Ricky Carmichael | 1999 | Racing | PlayStation | Developed by Funcom Dublin |
| No Escape | 2000 | Shooter | Windows | |
| Championship Motocross 2001 Featuring Ricky Carmichael | 2001 | Racing | PlayStation | Developed by Funcom Dublin |
| Anarchy Online | 2001 | MMORPG | Windows | |
| Dreamfall: The Longest Journey | 2006 | Adventure | Windows, Xbox | |
| Age of Conan: Unchained | 2008 | MMORPG | Windows | |
| Age of Conan: Rise of the Godslayer | 2010 | MMORPG | Windows | The first expansion pack for Age of Conan |
| The Secret World | 2012 | MMORPG | Windows | |
| Fashion Week Live | 2012 | Facebook game | Facebook | Fashion based social game |
| Pets vs. Monsters | 2012 | MMORPG | OS X, Windows | |
| Lego Minifigures Online | 2015 | MMORPG | Android, iOS, Linux, OS X, Windows | Developed by Funcom Oslo |
| The Park | 2015 | Adventure | PS4, Windows, Xbox One | Developed by Funcom Oslo |
| Hide and Shriek | 2016 | Multiplayer | Windows | Developed by Funcom North Carolina |
| Secret World Legends | 2017 | MMORPG | Windows | Developed by Funcom North Carolina |
| Conan Exiles | 2018 | Survival | PS4, Windows, Xbox One | Developed by Funcom Oslo |
| Dune: Awakening | 2025 | Survival | PS5, Windows, Xbox Series X/S | Developed by Funcom Oslo |
| World Heroes CD | Cancelled | Fighting | Sega CD | |
| Midgard | Cancelled | MMORPG | Windows | |

=== Games published ===
| Title | Release | Genre | Platforms | Notes |
|---|---|---|---|---|
| Anarchy Online | 2001 | MMORPG | Windows | Also developed by Funcom |
| Age of Conan: Unchained | 2008 | MMORPG | Windows | Also developed by Funcom |
| Age of Conan: Rise of the Godslayer | 2010 | MMORPG | Windows | The first expansion pack for Age of Conan |
| Bloodline Champions | 2011 | Action | Windows | Developed by Stunlock Studios |
| Lego Minifigures Online | 2015 | MMORPG | Android, iOS, Linux, OS X, Windows | Developed by Funcom Oslo |
| The Park | 2015 | Adventure | PS4, Windows, Xbox One | Developed by Funcom Oslo |
| Hide and Shriek | 2016 | Multiplayer | Windows | Developed by Funcom North Carolina |
| Secret World Legends | 2017 | MMORPG | Windows | Developed by Funcom North Carolina |
| Conan Exiles | 2018 | Survival | PS4, Windows, Xbox One | Developed by Funcom Oslo |
| Mutant Year Zero: Road to Eden | 2018 | Turn-based strategy | PS4, Windows, Xbox One | Developed by The Bearded Ladies |
| Conan Unconquered | 2019 | RTS | Windows | Developed by Petrogylph |
| Moons of Madness | 2019 | Horror | PS4, Windows, Xbox One | Developed by Rock Pocket Games |
| Conan Chop Chop | 2022 | Action-adventure | Nintendo Switch, PS4, Windows, Xbox One | Developed by Mighty Kingdom |
| Metal: Hellsinger | 2022 | First-person shooter | PS4, PS5, Windows, Xbox One, Xbox Series X/S | Developed by The Outsiders |
| Dune: Spice Wars | 2023 | 4X, Real-time strategy | Windows, Xbox Series X/S | Developed by Shiro Games |
| Aloft | 2025 (early access) | Co-op, Sandbox, Survival | Windows | Developed by Astrolabe Interactive |
| Dune: Awakening | 2025 | MMORPG | PS5, Windows, Xbox Series X/S | Developed by Funcom Oslo |
