= Age of Conan: Rise of the Godslayer =

- Developer: Funcom
- Publisher: Funcom (Note: Distributed by CompuExpert in North America and by Deep Silver in Europe.)
- Platform: Microsoft Windows
- Release: May 11, 2010
- Genre: Massively multiplayer online role-playing
- Mode: Multiplayer

Age of Conan: Rise of the Godslayer is an expansion set for the MMORPG Age of Conan. It was announced on August 18, 2009, by Funcom. The expansion is set in the mythical land of Khitai and features a new eastern theme. It was released on May 11, 2010.

== Overview ==
The expansion adds the mysterious eastern lands of Khitai to the game, a new zone for characters of levels 20-40 and four new high-level zones for level 80 characters, as well as new original music by Knut Avenstroup Haugen to convey the Asiatic atmosphere of the expansion regions. The expansion also adds the Alternative Advancement (AA) system, a new tree of character perks or feats.

== Plot and setting ==
The expansion is set in the lands of Khitai after the events of the short story The Tower of the Elephant when a young Conan killed the "Elephant God" Yag-Kosha out of mercy to free him from his suffering and captivity. Yag-Kosha had been imprisoned and tortured for many centuries by his greatest student and evil sorcerer Yara. This earned Conan the title of the "Godslayer". Yara was later slain by a jewel known as the Heart of the Elephant. Some time after when Conan became a king strange and terrible things started happening in the empire of Khitai. The player character must explore the dark roads of the Empire and walk the path of the Godslayer as they unravel a mature and deep storyline full of brutal conflict and political intrigue.

=== Khitai ===
Khitai is an ancient empire located in the east regions of the Hyborian continent. It is a stronghold of the world's greatest wizards and masters of the eastern world. Khitai has a powerful army and a sound leadership based in Paikang, Shu-Chen and Ruo-Chen. Khitai is forever at war with Kambuja to the south, whose god-kings vie with them for supremacy in the arcane mysteries of the Scarlet Circle. Khitai's borders are ill-defined, as no other "kingdom" lies near it. The Khitans themselves mark their western boundary at the Great Wall and the mountains upon which it is built. This mountain range runs north to the trackless, icy wastes, and south to the Southern Sea. Khitai overall has an Asiatic feel. The contains many high level dungeons and the Jade Citadel, a level 80 raid instance.

== Gameplay ==
=== Khitan Race ===
The Khitan race was added in the expansion. Khitan characters start play in Tortage and may choose the Assassin, Ranger, Bear Shaman, Guardian, Dark Templar, Necromancer, Herald of Xotli or Demonologist classes. The Khitans are mostly of medium height and with yellow skin.

=== New raids and dungeons ===
Many new instances were added with the expansion. The expansion expanded the raiding level in Age of Conan and added Tier 4. The most notable is the Jade Citadel, a level 80 raid instance where players can challenge the army of the emperor of Khitai himself. The expansion also adds a number of new Khitai dungeons. More have been added since the expansion's release.

=== Factions and new mounts ===
Rise of the Godslayer introduces the new Factions mechanic. Each player can choose their faction allegiances, and as they rise in the ranks they are able to collect new rewards such as gear, mounts, pets and other items. 12 new factions including the Scarlet Circle were added. Several new mounts were added to the game in the expansion. These are the Demon Howler, Vaaghasan Slaughter Steed and Hyrkanian Horse.

=== Alternative Advancement System ===
Alternate Advancement (AA) is a system developed and introduced with the Rise of the Godslayer that characters to progress beyond the level cap. The system is available for use beginning at level 20, but is mainly designed for use at level 80 (everything you do level 20 and beyond counts, but you make no significant gains until level 80). There are 3 types of AA: Mastery, Expertise, and Prowess. Mastery experience is gained by doing PVE, Prowess through PVP, and Expertise can be used for either and is gained from pots for doing special tasks.

== Critical reception ==
Reviews

Aggregate score
| Aggregator | Score |
|---|---|
| Metacritic | 83/100 |

Review scores
| Publication | Score |
|---|---|
| Eurogamer | 8/10 |
| GameSpot | 8.5/10 |
| IGN | 7.9/10 |
| GameStar | 9/10 |

The expansion was positively received by most critics. At Metacritic, which assigns a normalized rating out of 100 to reviews from mainstream critics the game has received an average score of 83 based on 14 reviews, which indicates "generally favorable reviews". IGN gave it 7.9/10. GameSpot rated it 8.5/10 saying "Despite a touch of monotony, Age of Conan's atmospheric first expansion is an absolute delight". Eurogamer gave it 8/10 and especially praised its environment details in their second review of the expansion. The first one was withdrawn since Eurogamer gave the expansion a bad review which led to criticism of the website by various people and video game critics. Eurogamer accepted it that they didn't give the original reviewer enough time and the original review was withdrawn.
