= Age of Conan =

2008 fantasy MMORPG

- North American cover
- Developer: Funcom
- Publishers: Funcom; Eidos Interactive
- Director: Gaute Godager
- Producer: Gaute Godager
- Designer: Andrew Griffin
- Programmer: Rui Manuel Monteiro Casais
- Artist: Didrik Tollefsen
- Writer: Ellen Lyse Einarsen
- Composer: Knut Avenstroup Haugen
- Engine: DreamWorld
- Platform: Microsoft Windows
- Release: NA: May 20, 2008; EU: May 23, 2008
- Genre: Massively multiplayer online role-playing game
- Mode: Multiplayer

Age of Conan: Unchained, originally released as Age of Conan: Hyborian Adventures, is a fantasy massively multiplayer online role-playing game developed by Funcom and published by Funcom and Eidos Interactive. It was released for Microsoft Windows in May 2008. The game is set in Robert E. Howard's Hyborian Age, after Conan has seized the throne of Aquilonia. Its gameplay includes a directional combat system in which players combine attacks, as well as character classes, cooperative play, player-versus-player combat, and large-scale sieges.

The game received generally favourable reviews. It sold more than 500,000 copies shortly after release and had sold 1.4 million copies by 2011. The expansion Rise of the Godslayer was released in 2010. In June 2011, Funcom renamed the game Age of Conan: Unchained and changed it to a hybrid business model combining free-to-play access with paid premium subscriptions. Additional adventure packs and other content were subsequently released.

== Gameplay ==
=== Combat ===
Combat comprises striking a target from different angles, such as hacking down against the head, slashing diagonally down from the left or right, and slashing diagonally up from the left or right. These directions are designed to be strung together in combination naturally during combat. Difficult-to-perform combinations cause additional damage and faster strikes.

The developer Funcom stated that their "Real Combat" system, a combat system designed to offer more real-time options than traditional Dungeons & Dragons-inspired "turn-based" combat systems that are more commonly used, will be a prime attraction of Age of Conan: Unchained. This "Real Combat" system is a first-person melee approach in which every enemy has three different areas that players can target. Combinations can be performed by stringing together consecutive attacks in particular directions. Feedback from players has pointed out that this system requires a certain degree of dexterity. Character statistics and item bonuses also play a role in this system, however item bonuses have less effect on a character's power than in comparable games, so that whilst equipment does play a certain role other factors also have an impact, such as the player's skill or their analysis of the scenario. The idea of "Real Combat" is to eliminate the dullness of typical MMO fighting, which often consists of an auto-attack feature.

The "Real Combat" system is used in one-on-one weapon battles, as well as during spell-casting, ranged combat and mounted combat. In some situations however, players will choose to band together and unite their skills to face other bands of players or non-player armies. Players can then work together and build on each other's strengths, for example a character standing in line with a 'Conqueror' when he is running will have a greater resistance to knockback effects.

Players are able to take part in large scale siege operations. Adventurers can cooperate with one another to build cities with walls, towers and catapults that can protect player-owned taverns and merchant facilities.

In July 2011, a Hardcore PvP server was launched for the EU and US servers. This hardcore PvP server removes the guards from the various cities and playfields and re-opened PvP on the instances around the city of Tortage. This hardcore server brings back the basics of MMO PvP combat in that players will have a chance at dropping loot from their inventory when they are killed in player vs player combat. Players are also only able to have one character on these servers. This was a fresh-start server which doesn't allow any character transfer to it, does not allow the use of offline levels, or free level 50 characters.

=== Characters ===
A screenshot of the character creation and extensive customization featured in Age of Conan

Characters in Age of Conan are registered to a unique user account on a specific online server, with characters created on one server unable to be played on another. Players are able to create characters which function as their virtual avatars in the online world of Hyboria. During character creation, the player may choose from four playable races. The character is one of four archetypes (in bold) and one of three class selections for each archetype. The Rise of the Godslayer expansion brought on a new race, the Khitan. Earlier only some classes were free to play but on December 13, 2012, all classes were made available in the free model.

== Setting ==
An Aquilonian character in Age of Conan gazing at the snowy mountains of northern Cimmeria

Age of Conan is set in a low fantasy pseudo-historical ancient world called the Hyborian Age, created by Robert E. Howard. The warlord Conan has seized the throne of Aquilonia, but ancient evils seek to overthrow him.

The Hyborian Age is like a dark, decadent, twisted and corrupt version of Euro-Asian history. Mix a bit of the Roman Empire, Mongolian culture and Babylonian mysticism with '30s-era myths of undiscovered Africa...

The lead artist Terje Lundberg said that the look and feel of Hyboria was based on the interpretation of the stories written by Howard:

When you read Howard's work you're immediately drawn into a gritty world of dark and ancient forces, and mighty and decadent civilizations. You feel the great weight of the ages and sense the very history in the crumbling mortar and the ruins. Therefore we've been mindful from the outset to create a world which is true to Howard's writing. There is majesty in Hyboria but it's of a monolithic, brutal and primitive kind – it certainly isn't "high fairie" where everything appears as though it was built only yesterday and is devoid of context.

Lundberg said the game at launch will contain three countries, Cimmeria, a northern country with snow and highlands, Aquilonia, which contains "green hills, lush riverbeds, and the marvelous city of Tarantia", and Stygia, which consists mostly of deserts and "some beautiful cities"—as well as the island of Tortage which "has a diverse geography ranging from jungle to harbors".

== Development ==
In January 2006, Funcom unveiled the community portal for Age of Conan: Hyborian Adventures. By this time, much of the pre-launch community had gathered around the forums and IRC chat of the official Age of Conan website. There were informal events such as IRC chats with the developers and, in summer 2006, community contests. In April 2006, Funcom created a forum for guild recruitment entitled the Guild Hall for its pre-launch community, allowing forum members began organizing their player guilds.

In January 2007, several important updates were announced regarding the expected launch window for the game. Funcom also announced the original twenty-three classes had been merged down to fourteen classes to avoid the lack of diversity between them.

Tortage City, the backwater capital of the Barrachan Isles, as seen in Age of Conan

On February 7, 2008, Funcom and Eidos announced that over 500,000 people had signed up for the Beta Testing of Age of Conan.

Five principal individuals worked on the music and audio for Age of Conan. The audio director was Morten Sørlie, who created the soundtrack for Anarchy Online – Shadowlands. Simon Poole (lead sound designer on Dreamfall – The Longest Journey) took over as audio director in May 2007, and saw the project through to completion. The sound designers are Tord D. Nikolaisen and Fredrik Martol. Composer Knut Avenstroup Haugen wrote the musical score for the game. To create a musical score for the Hyborian universe, Haugen turned to many different sources: For the music of the different ethnic groups, Haugen studied traditional music from relevant parts of the world. For the overall sound of the Hyborian Age, Haugen studied ancient and medieval music as well as the romantic orchestra repertoire and film scores, while avoiding conventions that connect too closely to specific historical periods.

The female vocalist heard in the score is Norwegian singer Helene Bøksle. The lyrics of the music is in the Old Norwegian language and comes from the Völuspá, the first and best known poem of the Poetic Edda. Norwegian punk rock artists Turbonegro contributed three bonus songs to the soundtrack CD, one of which was written specifically for the album.

Over 40 actors voiced the cast of characters. The recording was done at Side UK in London, Side LA in California, and at Funcom in Norway. The dance moves were made using motion capture on the dancer Hallgrim Hansegård, who is a backing dancer for the winning song of the Eurovision Song Contest 2009: "Fairytale" by Alexander Rybak.

== Release ==
Promotion at the GC 2008

Funcom delayed Age of Conan: Hyborian Adventures on January 21, 2008 and again on March 24, 2008. The delays were widely reported by online game magazines such as IGN. Once released, the game sold over 500,000 copies worldwide by June 1, 2008. Six days later one million copies had been shipped in total.

Since release, Funcom has made improvements to performance and changes and additions to the game which were not ready in time for launch, as well as in response to feedback from players. Additions have included new adventuring zones, and revamps of existing dungeons.

On May 19, 2008, GameZone.com presented a series of original fictional stories by Michael Lafferty, stemming from the massively multiplayer online world of Age of Conan – Hyborian Adventures. The stories were written with the permission and cooperation of Funcom. The tales explore the world, the characters and the lore involved in Hyboria.

In September 2008, Gaute Godager, the producer and game director resigned from his role in Age of Conan and from Funcom, a company he had been involved in for over 16 years. In his press release, he revealed that he was not happy with elements in the game's development since release. He was succeeded by Craig Morrison, previously game director of Anarchy Online, and community manager for various Funcom community forums.

On June 30, 2011, Funcom began marketing the game with the new title, Age of Conan: Unchained (as opposed to Age of Conan: Hyborian Adventures), and altered the subscription model to a hybrid one. A hybrid model incorporates free-to-play (no monthly fee is charged) and premium plans. Premium players may choose from 1-, 3-, 6-, and 12-month recurring payment, while free-to-play players have limited access to characters, features, and areas. Some of the limitations can be removed with the use of the new "Item Shop" (available only in the game), where items can be bought with the help of Funcom Points. Funcom Points can be earned either by subscribing or by buying them with real cash.

On February 22, 2013, Age of Conan was released on Steam.

In his monthly letter for August 2013, Joel Byos revealed a new major PvP event titled The Great Hyborian Race. A new server called the Blood and Glory ruleset server which will be started specifically for this event. The players will have to create a new character on this server in order to participate in this event. The objective is to reach level 80 in all classes by joining a guild or by going it alone. Those first to reach the level will be awarded special prizes. Those who reach a certain threshold of PvP experience within a given timeframe will be given bonus rewards. For the duration of the event, participants will be unable to use offline levels and restrictions will be placed on XP potions. Players have to earn experience through PvE and PvP fights. The developers are aiming to start the event after the server merge which was delayed due to office move by Funcom.

=== Additional content ===
==== Rise of the Godslayer ====
An expansion titled Age of Conan: Rise of the Godslayer was released on May 11, 2010, and can be bought for Funcom Points from the item shop by all players. It provides new areas for medium-level characters in the form of a home zone for the new playable race, the Khitans; and four additional regions for high-level characters. The new content also includes new companions that can be trained for use as combat pets, or as mounts. A faction system was introduced in order to add variety and re-playability to the new zones. Through new quests, group instances, and raids, players are able to gather tokens to buy new armour sets. An additional incentive is the Alternative Advancement system; a new tree of character feats or perks that are acquired by means of a dedicated point system. It also expanded the raiding in the game to add Tier 4.

==== Adventure packs ====
On August 31, 2011, Funcom released The Savage Coast of Turan adventure pack, which can be bought for Funcom Points from the item shop by all players. The pack includes a new playfield known as "Coast of Ardashir", two new solo instances, a group instance, a new 24-man raid instance called "Temple of Erlik" and a new combat pet. The new content was aimed to launch along with the 2011 film Conan the Barbarian, so that players had the chance to see some of the characters, armor, and weapons from the film.

On September 3, 2012, Funcom announced that it is planning a new adventure pack called Secrets of Dragon's Spine which was released in a series of updates. The pack introduces a new zone called Dragon's Spine, a row of small peaks in the southern wastes of Stygia. It will feature new quests, dungeons, challenges, a new mount type, a new raid instance and a new PvP area. The first update was released on live servers on January 10, 2013. On August 13, 2013, a new dungeon which also contains a city of the Serpent Men was added in the Dragon's Spine. A Serpent Man boss called Oldblood along with a new area was added on 6 March 2014.

A third adventure pack titled Shadow of Vanaheim was released for the game's seventh anniversary in May 2015. The story takes place in the Blue Mountains, which border the regions of Vanaheim and Asgard.

== Reception ==
Reviews

Aggregate scores
Aggregator	Score
GameRankings	81.47%
Metacritic	80/100

Review scores
Publication	Score
Edge	7 out of 10
G4	4/5
Game Informer	8/10
GameSpot	8.5/10
GameSpy	4/5
GameZone	9.4/10
IGN	7.8/10
Gamersnet	9.0/10.0
Gamereactor	9/10

The game received "generally favorable reviews" according to Metacritic. Seth Schiesel, writing for The New York Times, opined that the development of the game would have benefited from a few extra months of production.

Knut Avenstroup Haugen won the IFMCA award for Best Original Score for a Video Game or Interactive Media for his score.

The game had sold 1.4 million copies in 2011 when it switched to free to-play model.

== See also ==
- List of games based on Conan the Barbarian
