= Conan Exiles =

2018 video game

- Developer: Funcom (Note: Iron Galaxy co-developed the Xbox One version.)
- Publisher: Funcom
- Director: Joel Bylos
- Composer: Knut Avenstroup Haugen
- Engine: Unreal Engine 4
- Platforms: PlayStation 4; Windows; Xbox One; Xbox Series X/S
- Release: PlayStation 4, Windows, Xbox One; 8 May 2018; Xbox Series X/S; 8 June 2021
- Genres: Action-adventure, survival
- Modes: Single-player, multiplayer

Conan Exiles is a survival video game developed and published by Funcom for PlayStation 4, Windows, and Xbox One. The game is set in the world of Conan the Barbarian, with the custom playable character being rescued by Conan, beginning their journey. Early access versions of the game were released in early 2017, leaving early access on 8 May 2018. An enhanced version of the game for Xbox Series X and Series S was released on 8 June 2021. Conan Exiles Enhanced was released on May 5, 2026, updating the game to Unreal Engine 5.

== Gameplay ==
The most basic premise of Conan Exiles is survival in the fictional prehistoric Hyborian Age. Player characters begin convicted of various crimes, sentenced to death, and are crucified under the scorching desert sun. The player character is rescued by Conan and as an exile must navigate the Exiled Lands, a harsh desert landscape. A later update added a biome called the Frozen North, which added elements to build armors, and a land to explore. It also added Star metal which is used to build strong armor, and better tools and weapons. An additional biome, The Highlands, was added in 2017. A high-level Volcano area followed in Q2 2018 in the northernmost region of the game map. This newest addition added Obsidian, used to create powerful tools and weapons rivaling their Star Metal counterparts. Three additional biomes (The Savannah, The Floodlands, and The Ashlands) were added into the game with the release of the Isle of Siptah expansion DLC in Q1 2021. According to Funcom community manager, Jens Erik, the world size of the finished base game is around 53 km^{2}.

=== Character creation ===
Conan Exiles features a fair number of customization options such as gender, voice, and several physical attribute sliders for both head and body. Many races may be chosen from including, Cimmerian, Stygian, Hyborian, Nordheimer, and more. More controversially, sliders for both breast and penis size are also available, the latter being censored in North America by the ESRB.

Religion plays an important role in Conan Exiles. Players may initially swear allegiance to one of seven pantheon gods, Set, Yog, Mitra, Ymir, Derketo, Crom or Zath. All of the religions can later be learned from NPCs in-game, with the exception of Crom, as choosing this is the equivalent of choosing none at all, and is not represented by any in-game benefit. An additional deity, Jhebbal Sag, may be acquired only by speaking with a non-player character (NPC) and completing a certain dungeon. The player may then use any combination of their benefits at any given time, which mainly consists of special crafting recipes. Upon gathering enough offerings specific to each deity, their avatar may also be summoned by the player as a pinnacle form of offense, most commonly against other player bases.

=== Mechanics ===
Utilizing natural resources, the player must manage hunger and thirst gauges in addition to warding off hostile enemies, including other players if participating on a PvP server. NPC enemies include savannah and delta fauna such as crocodiles, hyenas, rhinoceroses, and more. Fictional creatures such as dragons, dinosaur-like "shalebacks", and various undead also populate The Exiled Lands. A number of aggressive human NPCs exist in small encampments, villages, and the small city. These human NPCs may be captured using Conan Exiles's thrall system. Depending on their profession and rank, captured thralls can provide a number of benefits to the player including faster crafting speeds, reduced material costs, exclusive crafting recipes, and melee or ranged defense.

=== Progression ===
Experience points are earned through successful combat, gathering, and crafting, as well as small amounts simply with the passing of time. Though lacking a formal class system, each level-up allows a degree of customization through the selection of attribute points and crafting recipes.

=== Backstory ===
The history of the Exiled Lands is revealed to the player by Warmaker Klael, one of the Giantkings, the ancient rulers of the Exiled Lands. Klael reveals that the humans once came to the Giantkings as refugees, and the Giantkings offered the humans the frozen wastelands of the North to settle. The humans built a city among the trees and practiced weird sciences and worshiped demon gods. There was peace and trade for a thousand years between the humans and Giantkings. However, due to human greed, war eventually broke out. When the war began, the Giantkings created the bracelet, adorned by all players to bend the will of the human prisoners of war, allow them to understand the language of Giantkings, and to prevent the humans from escaping. They came to rely on human prisoners to fight and labor for the Giantkings. The warmaker is now unsure of the bracelet's new purpose. Near the end of the war, humans revealed a new weapon, forged of science, smashing through troops and encasing the survivors in stone. In desperation, the Giantkings created the ritual that summoned the Sandstorm, which scorched and destroyed everything in its path. This is why most of the exiled lands are now a desert like waste. Now all the Giantkings are dead, except Warmaker Klael. After thousands of years, Conan comes to speak with the Warmaker and goes to search for the Serpent Ring of Set.

== Development ==
Since its release, Conan Exiles has received several major content updates, including new features and areas. As of a 2018 update, pets were added to the game, allowing animals to be captured in the wild in the form of baby animals or eggs, and raised as travel companions or player home defense. A mount system was planned for the game, but was not included in the game's release due to console performance limitations. As of 5 December 2019, the mount system has been implemented in an update, which includes both travel and mounted combat.

=== Downloadable Content ===
List of Downloadable Content for Conan Exiles
Name	Release Date	Description
Imperial East Pack	22 June 2018	Adds new cosmetic and building items based on the Khitan people.
Jewel of the West Pack	2 August 2018	Adds new cosmetic and building items inspired by the Aquilonian race.
The Savage Frontier Pack	9 October 2018	Adds new cosmetic and building items based on the Pictish people.
Seekers of the Dawn Pack	12 December 2018	Adds new cosmetic and building items themed around the kingdom of Yamatai.
Treasures of Turan Pack	15 April 2019	Adds new cosmetic and building items themed around the kingdom of Turan.
The Riddle of Steel	9 May 2019	Adds new cosmetic and building items inspired by the 1982 film Conan the Barbarian and its sequel.
Blood and Sand Pack	3 September 2019	Adds new cosmetic and building items.
Debaucheries of Derketo Pack	8 October 2019	Adds new cosmetics, building items, and emotes. The DLC was originally announced under the title Mysteries of Archeron.
Riders of Hyboria Pack	5 December 2019	Contains items and cosmetics themed around mounts, and was released alongside the free update introducing mounts.
Architects of Argos Pack	7 May 2020	Adds new items and cosmetics themed around the Argossean culture.
Isle of Siptah	27 May 2021	Expands the game map, adding a new area with dungeons, a new religion, and new items.
People of the Dragon Pack	21 October 2021	Adds new items and cosmetics themed around the kingdom of Nemedia.

== Reception ==
Reception

Aggregate score
Aggregator	Score
Metacritic	PC: 68/100; PS4: 68/100; XONE: 64/100

In the first week of Conan Exiles's early access release on Steam, it sold over 320,000 copies. Within the first 28 days, it had sold over 480,000 net copies (after returns and chargebacks), which was 7,000 short of the amount Funcom had projected to sell in the first year. As of July 2018, the game has sold 1.4 million copies, making it the biggest and fastest selling game in Funcom's history.

Conan Exiles received "mixed or average" reviews on all platforms, according to review aggregator Metacritic.
