= Daze Before Christmas =

1994 video game

- Mega Drive box art
- Developer: Funcom
- Publisher: Sunsoft
- Producers: Sam Patel; Henning Rokling
- Designers: Jack Kristoffersen; Gaute Godager; Bjorn Rostoen; Tommy Sydsaeter
- Programmers: Carl-Henrik Skårstedt (MD); Olav Mørkrid (SNES)
- Artists: Joachim Barrum; Tore Blystad; Ole-Petter Rosenlund
- Composers: Kim M. Jensen; Geir Tjelta
- Platforms: Mega Drive, Super NES
- Release: 1994
- Genre: Platform
- Modes: Single-player, multiplayer

Daze Before Christmas is a platform video game developed by Norwegian company Funcom for the Mega Drive and published by Sunsoft in 1994 in Australia. It was ported to the Super Nintendo Entertainment System and released in Europe and Australia. A North American release was planned but got cancelled.

== Gameplay ==
Anti-Claus's weapon is his sack of toys.

The player controls Santa Claus as he races to save Christmas from an evil mouse who has stolen the kids' presents, and cursed them with a spell. Santa faces foes such as giant rats, evil toys and living snowmen using his magic powers to turn them all into Christmas presents. He can also collect a power-up that makes him shoot flames which melt ice. Santa's magic can also be used to open the Christmas presents scattered around the levels. These presents may contain enemies, power-ups, bells, elves, or bombs. Santa's energy level is represented by Santa hats, which represent how many hits he can take before losing a life. He can collect more hats to replenish lost energy.

One of the game's distinguishing features is Santa's ability to turn into his evil twin, "Anti-Claus". By drinking a cup of tea, Santa transforms into a blue-suited, devilish looking version of himself. As Anti-Claus, Santa is invincible, but unable to use his magic or open presents. His primary method of attack is swinging his sack of toys at enemies.

In a break between platform levels, at several points in the game, Santa flies in his sleigh and uses the presents he collects to drop them down chimneys in several locations around the world.

== Development ==
The lead Mega Drive programmer of the game, Carl-Henrik Skårstedt has stated that the game took about a year to develop, but he did not start until the game was six months into development. He also said that he integrated source code from the Funcom-developed video game based on the film We're Back! A Dinosaur's Story into Daze Before Christmas. The game was ported to the Super NES by Olav Mørkrid and the process took about six months.

The level select cheat code for the Super NES version is said to refer to "Badla", the nickname of Geir Tjelta, a musician who worked on the game. The Mega Drive version's level select cheat code is said to refer to the Swedish word "Barra", which refers to a Christmas tree dropping its needles.

== Release ==
The Mega Drive version of the game was only released in Australia along with Ecco Jr. and Fatal Fury 2.

== Reception ==
Reception

Review scores
Publication	Score
Hyper	58/100 (SMD)
Mega Fun	46% (SNES)
Mega Zone	52/100 (SMD)

Reviewing the Mega Drive version for the magazine Mega Zone, Matthew Hall gave the game 52/100, saying that while he found the game "cute and cuddly" with "colourful and well-rounded" graphics, the backgrounds were repetitive and the music was droning. He concluded that the simplistic nature of the gameplay limited it to appealing to younger players. Reviewing the same version, Hyper gave it 58/100, calling it "undoubtedly the easiest game in the history of gaming" and opined that while it had "undeniable charm", it was too simplistic for anybody but "very young kids" to enjoy.
