= Header (film) =

- DVD released by Synapse Films
- Directed by: Archibald Flancranstin
- Screenplay by: Michael E. Kennedy
- Based on: Header by Edward Lee
- Produced by: Michael E. Kennedy; Michael Philip Anthony
- Starring: Jim Coope; Jake Suffian; Dick Mullaney; Elliot V. Kotek; Melody Garren
- Cinematography: Archibald Flancranstin
- Edited by: Archibald Flancranstin
- Music by: Ben Goldberg
- Production company: Mpyreal Entertainment
- Distributed by: Synapse Films
- Release date: August 12, 2006 (Rhode Island International Film Festival)
- Running time: 89 minutes
- Country: United States
- Language: English
- Budget: $349,999

Header is a 2006 horror film directed by Archibald Flancranstin, and written Michael E. Kennedy. It is based on the 1995 novella Header by Edward Lee.

== Plot ==
Imprisoned for involuntary manslaughter during a carjacking, Travis Clyde Tuckton is released from prison in 2003, and shacks up with his disabled grandfather, Jake Martin, in the old shoemaker's secluded West Virginia home. Jake elects to teach Travis everything he knows, starting with the family tradition of "headers"; the act of having sex with a hole drilled into a person's skull. Travis picks up a hitchhiker, and as Jake supervises, loses his "head humping" virginity to her. After killing a relative of a neighbor who had gotten into an argument with Jake, Travis vows to take revenge on all those who have wronged his family, declaring "An eye for an eye, and a head for a head!"

A parallel story concerns ATF agent Stewart Cummings, who has resorted to trafficking drugs in order to pay for his girlfriend Kathy's medicine. The plotlines intersect when Stewart investigates the mounting pile of header victims, with the evidence eventually pointing to Travis. After killing and robbing the two dealers he was carrying drugs for, Stewart picks up a hitchhiker, and asks her about Travis. The hitchhiker tells Stewart that Travis may be living with his grandfather, and gives him directions to Jake's cottage.

At the cottage, Travis kills Thibald Caudill, a man Jake claimed stole valuable land out from under their family, and killed Travis's parents (making it look like a car accident). Stewart walks in on Travis giving Thibald a header, and shoots both Travis and Jake, killing them. Stewart rushes back to his office, where he is told he is being arrested for murdering the drug dealers, one of whom was an undercover officer. A struggle ensues, and ends with Stewart shooting his superior and the arresting officer.

Stewart returns home, and discovers Kathy doing cocaine and having sex with her doctor, having been faking her illness to get drug money this entire time. Stewart snaps, kills the doctor, shoots Kathy in the knees, and gets a drill in preparation of giving her a header.

== Cast ==
- Stephen DeCaires as Young Travis
- Dick Mullaney as Jake Martin
- Christopher Woods as Travis's Paw
- Amanda Czelinski as Girl Running in Woods
- Jake Suffian as Agent Stewart Cummings
- Melody Garren as Kathy Crandel
- Jim Coope as Agent J.L. Peerce
- Kevin Dedes as Agent Chad Umbergy
- Elliot V. Kotek as Travis Clyde Tuckton
- Marc Raco as Prison Inmate
- Andrew Cowen as Spaz
- Lauren Devlin as Iree A. Reid
- Edward Lee as State Trooper #1
- Jack Ketchum as State Trooper #2
- Morris Fazzi Jr. as Nedder Kinney
- Patrick Nicholas as Dutch
- Stacey Brooks as Chessy Kinney
- Marcy J. Savastano as Dead Body in Field #1
- Lauren Gilray as Header Victim in Montage
- Alex Marthaller as Point Man
- Terri Radowsky as Dead Body in Field #2
- Tara Brooks as Betty Sue Morgan
- Ruth Maria Nicholas as Jan Beck
- Michael Philip Anthony as Truck Driver
- J. Malia Hawley as Sarah Dawn Slade
- Ruth Dimino as Hitchhiker
- Bill Corry as Thibald Caudill
- Colin Hoffmeister as Captain Philip Straker
- John A. Locke as Doctor Seymour

== Reception ==
A four out of five was awarded by Dread Central, which wrote "Header is a film in a class all its own, most likely because it scares the other students" and "Header takes its viewers on a dark, gritty, and uncomfortable journey to those places that most people would rather pretend don't exist. It is a cruel study of what humanity is capable of when the proper manipulation and motivation is involved". A half-star was given by DVD Talk, which concluded "Header is as stomach-churning as they come, but it's only on the surface: there's nothing genuinely unsettling about the film other than the massive number of problems hampering the final product".
