= Nancy A. Collins bibliography =

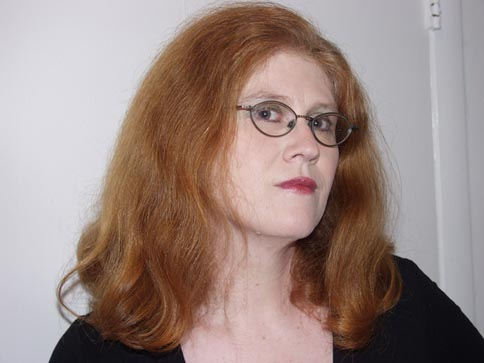
- Nancy A. Collins
- Novels↙: 21
- Collections↙: 6
- As editor↙: 3

Nancy A. Collins is an American horror novelist and short-story writer. She has written over 20 novels.

== Novels ==
Title	Date	Publisher	Length	Identifiers	Series	Notes / Plot	Ref.
Sunglasses After Dark	August 1, 1989	New American Library	253 pp	ISBN 9780451401472; LCCN 2008-570950; OCLC 20009394	Sonja Blue	Sonja Blue is a living vampire who still possesses a soul and acts as a vampire slayer, hunting down creatures that prey on the innocent. One the same night Sonja is turned, heiress Denise Thorne disappeared. Years later, Sonja comes into conflict with televangelist Catherine Wheele, who is exploiting Denise's parents, as well as the Other, the demonic personality trying to control her body.	
Tempter	September 3, 1990	Penguin Books	290 pp	ISBN 9780451402158; OCLC 750602214	Other		
In the Blood	January 7, 1992	Penguin Group	302 pp	ISBN 9780451451514; LCCN 2011-459497; OCLC 25073211	Sonja Blue		
Wild Blood	September 1, 1994	Roc Books	298 pp	ISBN 9780451454324; LCCN 2011-486350; OCLC 31048109	Other		
Walking Wolf	May 1, 1995	Mark V. Ziesing	181 pp	ISBN 0929480422; LCCN 95-60176; OCLC 32474304	Other		
Fantastic Four: To Free Atlantis	December 1, 1995	Berkley Books	305 pp	ISBN 9781572970540; LCCN 2011-486986; OCLC 441311232	Fantastic Four		
Paint It Black	May 18, 1995	New English Library	253 pp	ISBN 9780450610103; OCLC 42751833	Sonja Blue		
A Dozen Black Roses	August 1996	White Wolf Publishing	237 pp	ISBN 9781565048720; OCLC 35848030	Sonja Blue / World of Darkness		
Angels on Fire	September 1998	White Wolf Publishing	234 pp	ISBN 9781565049093; OCLC 39975513	Other		
Lynch	December 1, 1998	Cemetery Dance Publications	129 pp	ISBN 9781881475514; OCLC 481098246	Other		
Darkest Heart	January 1, 2002	White Wolf Publishing	183 pp	ISBN 9781565048454; LCCN 2005-298413; OCLC 50727199	Sonja Blue		
Final Destination: Looks Could Kill	November 29, 2005	Black Flame	385 pp	ISBN 1844163164; OCLC 62225982	Final Destination		
Final Destination 2	January 31, 2006	Black Flame	415 pp	ISBN 1844163180; OCLC 64583859	Final Destination	Collaboration with Natasha Rhodes.	
Vamps	July 22, 2008	HarperTeen	235 pp	ISBN 9780061349171; LCCN 2007-38746; OCLC 761530843	Vamps		
Vamps: Night Life	January 27, 2009	HarperTeen	234 pp	ISBN 978-0-06-134918-8; LCCN 2008-14680; OCLC 761530844	Vamps		
Vamps: After Dark	July 28, 2009	HarperTeen	180 pp	ISBN 978-0-06-134919-5; LCCN 2008-27470; OCLC 761530846	Vamps		
Right Hand Magic	December 7, 2010	Roc Books	289 pp	ISBN 978-0-451-46366-1; LCCN 2011-675795; OCLC 555645105	Golgotham		
Left Hand Magic	December 6, 2011	Roc Books	289 pp	ISBN 978-1-101-55905-5; OCLC 972713196	Golgotham		
Magic and Loss	November 5, 2013	Roc Books	290 pp	ISBN 978-0451464927; LCCN 2014-659750; OCLC 812070564	Golgotham		
Absalom's Wake	May 6, 2016	Crossroad Press	135 pp	OCLC 1119623111	Other		
Vampirella: Blood Invasion	November 9, 2019	Dynamite Entertainment	234 pp	ISBN 978-1-5241-1513-5	Vampirella		

== Collections ==
Title	Date	Publisher	Length	Identifiers	Series	Notes / Plot	Ref.
Nameless Sins	September 1, 1994	Gauntlet Publications	430 pp	ISBN 9780962965975; OCLC 40185755			
Midnight Blue: The Sonja Blue Collection	December 1, 1995	White Wolf Publishing	560 pp	ISBN 1565049004; LCCN 95-215664; OCLC 32397382	Sonja Blue		
Avenue X and Other Dark Streets	August 30, 2000	Xlibris	290 pp	ISBN 9780738825656; OCLC 45623135			
Knuckles and Tales	July 2002	Cemetery Dance Publications	339 pp	ISBN 9781587670152; OCLC 50619276			
Dead Roses for a Blue Lady	October 20, 2003	Two Wolf Press	199 pp	ISBN 1588468445; LCCN 2004-298201; OCLC 54008678	Sonja Blue		
Dead Man's Hand: Five Tales of the Weird West	September 2004	Two Wolf Press	319 pp	ISBN 1588468755; LCCN 2005-298263; OCLC 56633285			
The Death's Head Tavern: And Other Fantastic Tales	January 25, 2024	Hopedale Press	353 pp				

== As editor ==
Title	Date	Publisher	Length	Identifiers	Series	Notes / Plot	Ref.
Forbidden Acts	October 1, 1995	Avon Books	390 pp	ISBN 9780380779154; LCCN 95-90093; OCLC 33187950		Edited by Collins alongside Edward E. Kramer. Collins was the author of the short story "Furies in Black Leather".	
Dark Love	November 1, 1995	Roc Books	414 pp	ISBN 0451454723; LCCN 95-19119; OCLC 32627614		Edited by Collins alongside Edward E. Kramer and Martin H. Greenberg. Collins was the author of the short story "Thin Walls".	
Gahan Wilson's The Ultimate Haunted House	September 1, 1996	HarperPrism	191 pp	ISBN 0061053155; LCCN 96-18974; OCLC 34669324			
