= Speed Freaks =

1999 video game

- PAL version cover art
- Developer: Funcom
- Publisher: Sony Computer Entertainment
- Platform: PlayStation
- Release: UK: 27 August 1999; NA: 18 April 2000
- Genre: Racing
- Modes: Single-player, multiplayer

Speed Freaks (released as Speed Punks in North America) is a racing video game developed by Funcom and published by Sony Computer Entertainment for the PlayStation. It supports up to two players (four with a multitap for PlayStation).

The game involves racing around a variety of tracks while using several weapons, including items that make the racer's speed increase, missiles, and slime.

== Gameplay ==
Single player Tournament mode. The green cubes are the pick-up icons and the purple hexagons are speed boost tokens.

Speed Freaks is a kart racing game featuring several single and multiplayer modes. During the game, players take control of one of nine characters and drive karts around tracks with various themes. Races are played in third-person perspective, with the point of view behind the chosen character's cart. The goal of the game is to either finish a race ahead of other racers, who are controlled by the computer and other players, or complete a circuit in the fastest time.

Icons marked with question marks are arrayed on the race tracks; they give weapons (pick-ups) to a player's kart if the vehicle passes over them. Pick-ups, such as missiles and slime, allow racers to hit others with the objects, causing them to spin and lose control. A kart that obtains the stealth mode pick-up is temporarily invulnerable to attack. Lines of speed boost tokens are found on the tracks. By running through these tokens, a kart collects them and fills cells on its speed boost bar. The player can use accumulated speed boost to increase speed at a faster rate than under normal acceleration.

=== Modes ===
Speed Freaks has three single player modes, Tournament, Single Race and Time attack. In Tournament one player races against five computer-controlled characters in a series of four races called leagues. There are three leagues available, titled Easy, Medium and Hard. Initially only the Easy league is available, by finishing this league, the Medium league is unlocked, which in turn unlocks the Hard league when finished. In order to continue through, a league a position of third or higher must be achieved in each race. If a player finishes in fourth to sixth position, the race must be retry – at the cost of one of a limited number of retries – until a placing of third or above is achieved. Points are accrued by finishing in the top three positions in a race; first to third place receive ten, seven and five points. Computer controlled characters are also awarded three points for fourth place and one point for fifth place. The racer with the highest number of points after all four races have been completed wins the league. winning all of the races in a league unlocks one of Three Challenges. In each challenge a player races against one computer-controlled character in a single race, where if the player wins the race, their opponent becomes a playable character. In single race mode, players compete against five computer-controlled characters at a track of the players' choosing from those that are present in Tournament mode. In time attack mode, players race against the clock through the same tracks that are present in Tournament mode, attempting to set the fastest time possible.

Speed Freaks also has two multiplayer modes: Vs. and Multiplayer. In Vs. mode two players race against each other either in a single race or through a league, on the same tracks as are present in the Tournament mode, with the screen split in half. In Multiplayer mode three or four players race against each other, on one of 12 additional tracks. The tracks featured in this mode have lower detail than those in single player and Vs. mode. This game mode requires the Multitap peripheral in order for four controllers to be connected to the PlayStation.

=== Characters ===
Speed Freaks features nine original characters from which the player can choose to compete as or against. Six characters are available immediately at the start of the game and three further characters can be unlocked by beating them in a challenge. Each character's kart has different capabilities with differing levels of top speed, acceleration, handling and collision recovery.

== Development ==
Speed Freaks was produced by Padraig Crowley and designed and developed by the SD Team at Funcom Dublin in Ireland. The game took three years to develop. Working titles used included "Project SDR" and "Wheelnuts".

When designing the physics model, the developers opted for a balance between realism and fun by developing a realistic physics model as a base and then modifying it to make it more enjoyable to play. As an example, the developers cited that bumping into a wall in the game results in far less of an impact than doing the same in real life.

The developers used hand-optimised assembly code for the graphics engine in order to make it fit into the small instruction cache of the PlayStation hardware. The graphics engine used both Gouraud shading and textures on polygons, and the makers believe it is only the second racing game on the PlayStation to use Gouraud shading.

The game was released in North America under the title Speed Punks. Sony acquired the rights to publish the game in the region as early as the summer of 1999, but held back as to avoid competing with Crash Team Racing.

"Travelling Without Moving" by Jamiroquai is used in the introduction video of this videogame. Other music within the game is by Martin Schioler.

== Reception ==
Reception

Aggregate score
Aggregator	Score
GameRankings	79%

Review scores
Publication	Score
AllGame	4/5
CNET Gamecenter	8/10
Electronic Gaming Monthly	6.875/10 (Note: In Electronic Gaming Monthly's review of the game, one critic gave it 8/10, two gave it each a score of 7/10, and the other gave it 5.5/10.)
Game Informer	7/10
GameFan	89%
GameRevolution	B
GameSpot	8.4/10
IGN	9/10
Jeuxvideo.com	15/20
Next Generation	2/5
Official U.S. PlayStation Magazine	4.5/5
The Sydney Morning Herald	4.5/5

The game received favorable reviews according to the review aggregation website GameRankings, but Adam Pavlacka of NextGen gave a negative review to the game. GamePro said that Speed Punks offers an enjoyable arcade racing experience despite its shortcomings. (Note: GamePro gave the game two 4/5 scores for graphics and fun factor, and two 3.5/5 scores for sound and control.)
