= Edward Lee (writer) =

American novelist

- Born: May 25, 1957 (age 69); Washington, D.C., U.S.
- Occupations: Novelist, short story writer
- Writing career
- Pen name: Philip Straker, Richard Kinion
- Years active: 1982–2024
- Genre: Horror fiction

Edward Lee (born May 25, 1957) is an American horror novelist who has written 40 books, more than half of which have been published by mass-market New York City paperback companies such as Leisure/Dorchester, Berkley, and Zebra/Kensington. He is a Bram Stoker award nominee for his story “Mr. Torso”, and his short stories have appeared in over a dozen mass-market anthologies, including the award-winning “999”. Several of his novels have sold translation rights to Germany, Greece, Romania, and Poland. He also publishes quite actively in the small-press/limited-edition hardcover market; many of his books in this category have become collector's items.

== Life and career ==
Lee is particularly known for over-the-top occult concepts and an accelerated treatment of erotic and/or morbid sexual imagery and visceral violence. He was born on May 25, 1957, in Washington, D.C., and grew up in Bowie, Maryland. In the late 70s he served in the U.S. Army's 1st Armored Division, in Erlangen, West Germany, then, for a short time, was a municipal police officer in Cottage City, Maryland. Lee also attended the University of Maryland as an English major but quit in his last semester to pursue his dream of being a horror novelist. For over 15 years, he worked as the night manager for a security company in Annapolis, Maryland, while writing in his spare time. In 1997, however, he became a full-time writer, first spending several years in Seattle and then moving to Largo, Florida, where he currently resides.

Lee cites as his strongest influence horror legend H. P. Lovecraft; in 2007, Lee embarked on what he calls his “Lovecraft kick” and wrote a spate of novels and novellas which tribute Lovecraft and his famous Cthulhu Mythos. Among these projects are Trolley No. 1852, Pages Torn From A Travel Journal, Haunter Of The Threshold, The Innswich Horror, Lucifer's Lottery, and The Dunwich Romance.

== Bibliography ==
=== Novels and Novellas ===
- Night Bait (1982) (written under the pseudonym Philip Straker)
- Night Lust (1982) (written under the pseudonym Philip Straker)
- Ghouls (1988)
- Coven (1991)
- Incubi (1991)
- Succubi (1992)
- The Chosen (1993)
- Creekers (1994)
- Mr. Torso (1994)
- Sacrifice (1995) (written under the pseudonym Richard Kinion)
- Header (1995)
- Goon (1996) with John Pelan
- The Bighead (1997)
- Shifters (1998) with John Pelan
- Portrait of the Psychopath as a Young Woman (1998) with Elizabeth Steffen
- Splatterspunk: The Micah Hays Stories (1998) with John Pelan
- Masks (1999)
- Operator B (1999)
- Dahmer’s Not Dead with Elizabeth Steffen (1999)
- The Stickmen (1999)
- The Deaths of the Cold War Kings: The Assassinations of Diem & JFK with Bradley O'Leary (2000)
- City Infernal (2001): Cemetery Dance Publications.
- Sex, Drugs and Power Tools (2002)
- Family Tradition (2002) with John Pelan
- Monstrosity (2002): Cemetery Dance Publications.
- Ever Nat (2003)
- The Baby (2003)
- Teratologist (2003) with Wrath James White
- Incubi (2003): Necro Publications.
- Infernal Angel (2003): Cemetery Dance Publications. Published as a 26-copy leather-bound hardcover and 750-copy limited hardcover.
  - (January 2004): Leisure Books. Published as a Mass Market Paperback.
- Messenger (August 2004): Leisure Books. Published as a Mass Market Paperback.
- The Backwoods (October 2005): Leisure Books. Published as a Mass Market Paperback.
  - (December 2005): Cemetery Dance Publications. Published as a 52-copy leather-bound hardcover and 750-copy limited hardcover.
- Monster Lake (2005). Necro Publications. First book for young readers.
- Flesh Gothic (February 2005): Leisure Books. Published as a Mass Market Paperback.
- Slither (2006: Necro Publications.)
- Gast (2007)
  - (October 2009): Leisure Books. Revised, retitled Black Train, and published as a Mass Market Paperback.
- House Infernal (October 2007): Leisure Books. Published as a Mass Market Paperback.
  - (February 2008): Cemetery Dance Publications. Published as a 26-copy leather-bound hardcover and 1000-copy limited hardcover.
- Minotauress (December 2008): Necro Publications. Published as a 26-copy leather-bound hardcover and 300-copy limited hardcover.
- Brides of the Impaler (September 2008): Leisure Books. Published as a Mass Market Paperback.
  - (May 2011): Cemetery Dance Publications. Published as Hardcover Limited Edition of 1000 signed copies bound in full cloth and Smyth sewn and Traycased Hardcover Lettered Edition of 52 signed and lettered copies bound in leather with a satin ribbon page marker.
- Golemesque (March 2009): Necro Publications. Published as a 26-copy leather-bound hardcover and 300-copy limited hardcover.
  - (April 2009): Leisure Books. Published as Golem as a Mass Market Paperback.
- Trolley No. 1852 (May 2009): Bloodletting Press. Published as a 26-copy leather-bound hardcover and 300-copy limited hardcover.(October 2010) Deadite Press, Trade Paperback.
- The Haunter of the Threshold (Summer 2009) Bloodletting Press. Limited-edition. (December 2010) Deadite Press, Trade Paperback.
- City of Sixes (2009) Necro Publications. Exclusive limited-edition chapbook included with copies of Infernally Yours.
- You are My Everything (January 2010) Necro Publications.
- Going Monstering (January 2010) Bloodletting Press. Exclusive limited-edition.
- Header 2 (June 2010) Camelot Books. Exclusive limited-edition.
- The Innswich Horror (Summer 2010) Cemetery Dance. Limited edition (July 2010), Deadite Press Trade paperback, (2012) digital Necro Publications.
- Lucifer's Lottery (October 2010) Dorchester, eBook. (July 2011) trade paperback.
- Pages Torn From a Travel Journal (January 31, 2011) Bloodletting Press.
- Vampire Lodge (January, 2011) Necro Publications. E-Book only (second book for young readers)
- Witch Water (Spring 2011) Bloodletting Press. Limited edition hardcover. (Feb. 2012) Dorchester. Paperback/eBook
- The Dunwich Romance (2011)
- The Doll House (2017)
- Header 3 (2017) with Ryan Harding; Bloodletting Press. Limited edition
- White Trash Gothic (2017)
- White Trash Gothic 2 (2019)
- In the Year of Our Lord: 2202 (2019)
- White Trash Gothic III (2020)
- The Television (2022)
- The Bighead's Junk (October 2023)
- Nipping Them in the Bud (June 2024)

=== Collections ===
- The Ushers (1999)
- Of Pigs and Spiders (1999) with John Pelan, Brett Alexander Savory and David Niall Wilson
- Partners in Chyme (2001) with Ryan Harding
- Sleep Disorder (2003) with Jack Ketchum
- Haunted House (2007)
- Brain Cheese Buffet (2010) Deadite Press
- Bullet Through Your Face (2010) Deadite Press
- Carnal Surgery (April 2011) Deadite Press
- Mangled Meat (July 2011) Deadite Press

=== Anthologies ===
- Infernally Yours (2009) "The Senery" by Edward Lee Necro Publications, a limited-edition hardcover.
- Dark Seductions: Tales of Erotic Horror (1993) "Private Pleasures" by Edward Lee
- Bizarre Sex and Other Crimes of Passion (1994) "I"d Give Anything for You" by Edward Lee & Jack Ketchum
- Deadly After Dark: The Hot Blood Series (1994) "Mr. Torso" by Edward Lee
- Seeds of Fear: The Hot Blood Series (1995) "Grub Girl" by Edward Lee
- Stranger By Night: The Hot Blood Series (1995) "Dead Girls in Love" by Edward Lee & Gary Bowen
- Darkside: Horror for the Next Millennium (1996) "The Stick Woman" by Edward Lee
- Fear the Fever: The Hot Blood Series (1996) "Love Letters from the Rain Forest" by Jack Ketchum & Edward Lee
- White House Horrors (1996) "Night of the Vegetables" by Edward Lee
- The UFO Files (1997) "Secret Service" by Edward Lee
- Inside The Works (1997) "The Pig" by Edward Lee
- Whitley Strieber"s Aliens (1998) "Scripture Girl" by Edward Lee
- 999 (1999) "ICU" by Edward Lee
- Graven Images (2000) "Masks" by Jack Ketchum & Edward Lee
- Triage (2001) "In the Year of Our Lord 2202" by Edward Lee
- Excitable Boys (2002) "The McCrath Model SS40-C, Series S" by Edward Lee
- Damned: An Anthology of the Lost (2004) "Angel" by Edward Lee
- Small Bites (2004) "The Room" by Edward Lee

=== Movies ===
Edward Lee's story "Header" has been made into the film Header. Edward Lee and Jack Ketchum are featured in cameo roles in the movie.

"Grub Girl" was made into a film in 2006.
