= Lego Minifigures Online =

2015 video game

- Developer: Funcom
- Publisher: Funcom
- Platforms: Microsoft Windows, OS X, Linux, iOS, Android
- Release: WW: 29 June 2015
- Genre: Massively multiplayer online
- Mode: Multiplayer

Lego Minifigures Online was a massively multiplayer online game developed and published by Funcom and released on 29 June 2015. It was based on the Lego Minifigures theme, allowing the player to unlock, and to play, as various characters from the theme, while also incorporating elements from classic Lego themes, such as castle, and space, and also involving new themes, like mythology. In addition to unlocking new minifigures through normal gameplay, the player was able to unlock minifigures by purchasing physical Lego Minifigures blind bags, which contain special codes that, once entered, allowed the character to be unlocked instantly. All online services for the game were shut down on 30 September 2016.

== Gameplay ==
The game took inspiration from both classic isometric role-playing video games, and modern Lego video games. The player could click to move their character, and attack enemies, also to smash and build Lego objects. The player could have up to three minifigures to quickly swap between while playing, and could also open their inventory to change which three they had immediate access to. Minifigures could also be leveled up with experience points, to improve their abilities. The game contained numerous themed worlds, accessed from a hub, with each world containing multiple dungeons to raid. The player was also able to battle against other players, in teams.

== Minifigures ==
The characters included in the game were some of the minifigures from the Lego Minifigures series. As of September 2014, several minifigures were available for purchase for use in the game through 6 and 10 month memberships, but were made completely available when the game was fully released as a pay-to-play title, on 29 June 2015.

== Development ==
Lego Minifigures Online was first announced in August 2013 as a free-to-play title. The game underwent a beta testing phase, and was made public for Microsoft Windows, OS X, and Linux, on 29 October 2014. The game was fully released on 29 June 2015, although as a pay-to-play title, for Microsoft Windows, OS X, Linux, iOS, and Android.

Due to the game's failure to meet Funcom's internal revenue forecasts, Lego Minifigures Online was shut down, on 30 September 2016.
