= Draugen =

Draugen may refer to:

- Draugen oil field, an oil field in the Norwegian Sea
- Draugen (video game), a 2019 video game developed by Ragnar Tørnquist and Red Thread Games
- ST Draugen, a Norwegian tug sunk on July 15, 1940
- Draugen, Norwegian singular of Draug, undead creatures from Norse mythology
- Draugen, stage name of Joel Andersson, ex-drummer of Swedish black metal band Dark Funeral
- Draugen, a 2005 album by Norwegian black metal act Burzum
- "Draugen", a track on the album Älvefärd by the Swedish folk metal band Otyg
- "Draugen", a track on the album Nattväsen by the Swedish Viking metal band Månegarm
