= Dreamfall Chapters =

2017 episodic 3D adventure video game

- Developers: Red Thread Games; Blink Studios
- Publisher: Deep Silver
- Director: Ragnar Tørnquist
- Producer: Rakel Johnsen
- Designers: Martin Bruusgaard; Quintin Pan
- Programmers: Audun Tørnquist; Morten Nøst
- Artists: Christer Sveen; Kjetil Hjeldnes
- Writers: Ragnar Tørnquist; Dag Scheve
- Composer: Simon Poole
- Engine: Unity
- Platforms: Microsoft Windows, OS X, Linux, PlayStation 4, Xbox One
- Release: Book One: WW: 21 October 2014; Book Two: WW: 12 March 2015; Book Three: WW: 25 June 2015; Book Four: WW: 3 December 2015; Book Five: WW: 17 June 2016; The Final Cut: PlayStation 4, Xbox One; WW: 5 May 2017 Microsoft Windows, OS X, Linux; WW: 21 July 2017
- Genre: Adventure
- Mode: Single-player

Dreamfall Chapters is an episodic 3D adventure game with emphasis on character interaction, exploration of the game world, and puzzle solving. It is a sequel to the adventure games The Longest Journey and Dreamfall: The Longest Journey. The game was released for PC in five episodes between October 2014 and June 2016. The updated "Final Cut" version was released on physical media for PlayStation 4 and Xbox One in May 2017, and the Microsoft Windows, OS X, and Linux versions in July 2017.

The Longest Journey series is set in two parallel universes: Stark, a cyberpunk future Earth, and Arcadia, its magical fantasy counterpart. Chapters takes place in 2219 and continues the story of Dreamfall, whose protagonist Zoë Castillo had uncovered a criminal conspiracy that aimed to enslave both Stark and Arcadia by controlling their residents' dreams. Although Zoë managed to disrupt the conspirators' plans, she was betrayed and left in a coma at the end of Dreamfall, and has to find her purpose in life again in Chapters. The writers described the narrative theme of the game as "chapters of life".

Dreamfall Chapters was developed by Red Thread Games, an independent studio founded by Ragnar Tørnquist, who wrote and directed the previous two games. Funcom, the owners of The Longest Journey IP, had licensed the rights to develop the next installment out to Tørnquist's studio. Its development was crowd-funded by a Kickstarter campaign that raised over $1.5 million, with additional funding provided by the Norwegian Film Institute. Publisher Deep Silver released the game on consoles in 2017 to mixed reviews.

== Gameplay ==
Dreamfall Chapters was originally developed on the Unity 4 game engine, but was retroactively upgraded to Unity 5 before the release of Book Four. It features large 3D environments, as opposed to 2D backgrounds in The Longest Journey and smaller 3D locations in Dreamfall. While not a completely open world, the game contains several free-roaming exploration levels, such as Europolis and Marcuria, and rewards the player for exploring the levels and finding secrets. The locations themselves change slightly as the story progresses to reflect the passage of time.

An example of the choice-making mechanic: Kian considers using torture in an interrogation, while the player is informed how many other players made this choice.

The player steers playable characters from an over-the-shoulder third-person view, using either the WASD keys and mouselook or a gamepad. Interactive characters and objects are highlighted on the screen, allowing the player to interact with them using the mouse and context menus. While the game supports game controllers, it was optimized for the PC. The gameplay focus is on the exploration of the environments and the story and on solving puzzles. Dialogue with NPCs and dialogue puzzles comprise about half of the gameplay time. The on-screen interface is hidden by default to improve the immersion. There is no combat or stealth gameplay in Dreamfall Chapters.

Although the game features a linear plot with a set outcome, the player has to make many choices throughout the game that have far-reaching impact on the later story events, but not the ending. An optional, online-only "social" feature allows players to discover (either before, or after making the choice) which options other players (and their Facebook friends in particular) picked in these situations. These statistics are stored in a shared global database for all platforms. The game additionally displays a special "The balance has shifted" icon to warn the player before plot-relevant choices, even when playing offline. An in-game journal, akin to April Ryan's diary in The Longest Journey, keeps track of the recent plot developments.

== Plot ==
=== Background ===

The palette of Stark, a cyberpunk future Earth (above), sharply contrasts that of the fantasy-inspired Arcadia (below).

In the mythology of the series, Earth is one of countless worlds in the multiverse, created from the primordial Storytime by the dreaming of a being known as Lux, the First Dreamer. Earth, or "Stark" as it is known in-game, is a world of science existing in Balance with its "Twin World" of magic, Arcadia, split off and separated from it by the impassable Divide twelve millennia ago. The game takes place in 2220 CE by Stark's reckoning, and its chief antagonist is Brian Westhouse, a Starkian trapped in Arcadia, who plans to return home by forcibly reuniting the Twin Worlds with the power of the Undreaming, the destructive counterpart to Lux. To strengthen the Undreaming with dream energy, Westhouse, as "the Prophet", had conspired with the corrupt officials of the Azadi Empire in Arcadia and an ambitious Starkian scientist Helena Chang to build a giant dream-storing Engine in the recently conquered Arcadian city-state of Marcuria and to imbue it with the dream energy stolen from Stark by Chang's lucid dream-inducing invention, the "Dreamachines". Chang had also secretly planned to instead use the stolen dream energy to reshape reality itself with the help of her genetically engineered "Dreamers", i.e. humans with powers equal to Lux. She had deemed her first artificial Dreamer a failure, however, and the girl was instead raised by Chang's partner Gabriel Castillo as his own daughter, Zoë.

In Dreamfall, a 20-year-old Zoë had learned that Chang's sponsors, the Japan-based megacorporation WatiCorp, planned to brainwash Dreamachine users in a bid for world domination, but after failing to stop them, she was put into a coma by Chang. At the same time in Arcadia, an elite Azadi operative Kian Alvane investigated the corruption in Marcuria but was charged with high treason and imprisoned. In Chapters, their stories finally converge in Book Five, where they also tie in with the arc of the third playable character, Saga, which, until then, is mainly told in the Interludes.

=== Synopsis ===
After putting Zoë in a coma, Chang brought her body to a secret lab in Mumbai, while her consciousness became trapped in Storytime along with millions of Dreamachine addicts. As Zoë attempts to wake herself up, she instead creates a secondary physical body for herself in Stark, which has no memories of her adventures and travels to Europolis to start a new life. While both Wati and Chang's agents shadow her every move, Zoë becomes an activist for the upcoming elections, but soon discovers that Wati has bought off most parties, including her own. They then tarnish the only uncorrupted party by manipulating one of its activists and Zoë's friend Nela into a suicide bombing. The blast injures Zoë but also brings back some of her memories. When Zoë attempts to use a Dreamachine to recover the rest, her secondary body disappears from Stark and appears in Arcadia. There, she reunites with her talking bird sidekick Crow and embarks on a journey to find the dreaming Lux. After merging with and gaining Lux's powers, Zoë's real body wakes up in Mumbai, where she reunites with her biological parents. However, Chang manages to sedate her, still intending to exploit her abilities.

At the same time in Arcadia, one of the Azadi empresses arrives to Marcuria with General Hami and Mother Utana, Kian's mentor and stepmother, respectively. Afraid of Kian's confessions, the Prophet's accomplices attempt to execute him without a trial, but the anti-Azadi rebels break him out to recruit him to their cause. On one of Kian's missions for the rebels, he bonds with a young Dolmari urchin named Bip, who helps him uncover an imminent raid on the magical ghetto. The rebels are unable to prevent it, however, and Bip, along with many other magicals, is deported to a remote death camp. Kian mounts a rescue mission and witnesses his country's atrocities against the magical peoples, using this evidence to convince Hami to bring down the Marcurian officials before they activate the Engine. Upon return, they rally the surviving rebels and a few of Hami's own men to attack it. Crow, back from his journey with Zoë, shows Kian a secret passage to the Engine control room, but before he can sabotage it, Mother Utana reveals herself as another agent of the Prophet and fatally wounds him. The Prophet then murders Crow and activates the Engine.

The third storyline begins in the prologue, where April Ryan, who had perished in Dreamfall, is reincarnated as Saga in the House of All Worlds, a mystical location between all worlds and timelines of the multiverse. Saga's mother disappears soon after her birth, and despite her father's best efforts to suppress her inherited world-traveling powers, Saga runs away from home at the age of 14 to wander the multiverse and, like April, grows up to become a habitual fulfiller of various prophecies. Acting on one such prophecy, she travels to Arcadia just in time to heal Kian with an alchemical concoction after Utana and the Prophet leave him to bleed out. Zoë, in the meantime, finds herself in Storytime again, where Crow's ghost helps her to piece together the Prophet's plan and leaves for the afterlife together with April's spirit. Now fully in control of her and Lux's powers, Zoë awakens in the Mumbai lab just in time to see Saga open a portal to the Engine control room. Zoë passes her discoveries on to Kian, then guides a repentant Azadi engineer named Ferdows through sabotaging the Engine, while Kian kills the Prophet's henchman Roper Klacks to unleash the Undreaming, which the Prophet had trapped within his body. As it possesses the Prophet and flings him to Stark, Zoë reunites it with Lux and thus restores the Balance between creation and destruction, before passing out from exhaustion. In Marcuria, the corrupt Azadi officials are killed by the rebels, but Utana escapes with the empress. Saga finds Crow's body and carries it off to another world.

A week later, Kian leaves Marcuria to pursue Utana, but is intercepted by Saga who, acting on another prophecy, demands to join him and also that he adopts her, foreshadowing the major role they both will play in the War of the Balance that is to precede the looming reunification of the Twin Worlds. Zoë, meanwhile, awakens in a hospital and reconciles with Gabriel. Five years later, Kian and Saga look over the Azadi capital, ready to face their destiny, while Zoë enjoys a peaceful life in Casablanca, pregnant with a baby. In the epilogue, many years after the Twin Worlds were reunited, an elderly Saga, now Lady Alvane, reminisces about her travels and chats with the reincarnated Crow, before settling down in her armchair in the House of All Worlds to greet April, mirroring the same scene that occurred in the original The Longest Journey.

=== Themes ===
The subtitle "Chapters" refers to the theme of the game, which Tørnquist describes as "chapters of life" and "life in chapters", such as birth, life, death. The game's plot covers roughly a year of the protagonists' lives, beginning in spring and ending in winter. The narration is divided into thirteen chapters (like the previous games) or five "books", themed around a particular phase of life, e.g. birth (or rebirth) in the first book. Originally, three books, corresponding to summer, autumn, and winter, were planned, but this number grew to accommodate the expanded story.

Another topic of the game is the stories as such and how they become reality. In-game, the realm of "Storytime" is "the place where every story begins, and where dreams come to life", and the developers cite the Australian Aboriginal mythology as inspiration. The character Helena Chang outright identifies Storytime with the Aboriginal Dreamtime in the in-game dialogue, while another, Saga, explains her world-traveling powers with the use of songlines, another concept from Aboriginal beliefs.

The Longest Journey series as a whole is rooted in a predeterministic philosophy, which compares life to a journey with a set destination: a person may choose their course freely but will ultimately arrive to a "predestined place". In Dreamfall Chapters, this philosophy is expressed in the player characters' ability to make story-altering decisions, which, however, have no effect upon the ending.

The megacity of Europolis is presented as "Europe [...] finally paying the price for hundreds of years of imperialism, reactionary politics, wasteful spending and industrialisation". In an interview, Ragnar Tørnquist said that "there's definitely a political element to Dreamfall Chapters, as there was to Dreamfall as well."

== Development ==
=== Pre-production ===
Funcom, the developer of the original The Longest Journey and Dreamfall, first announced Dreamfall Chapters on 1 March 2007. However, while its plot was already written out at that point, production of the game did not begin until 2012 because all of the original creators of Dreamfall, including Tørnquist, were at the time working on Funcom's next MMORPG The Secret World.

On 1 November 2012, it was announced that Tørnquist's newly-founded studio Red Thread Games began the pre-production for Dreamfall Chapters. Because Funcom's focus has shifted to online games, the company decided to license the rights to The Longest Journey IP to Tørnquist's development studio, who would fund and produce the game independently. Although Tørnquist stated he took no other Funcom employees to Red Thread Games with him, his studio hired many of the original developers of Dreamfall who have since left Funcom, as well as formed a partnership with Blink Studios, which consists of former Funcom employees who worked on Dreamfall and have since developed an expertise with the Unity engine.

=== Funding ===
Following the initial announcement, the Norwegian Film Fund awarded Funcom a grant to "research online-only delivery methods of episodic content", which would have been used to finance the initial development of Dreamfall Chapters; however, after the project was put on hold, the grant was returned to the NFF. The Norwegian Film Institute, the successor to the NFF, provided a new grant of 1 million NOK (ca. $174,000) for Red Thread Games to begin pre-production of Dreamfall Chapters in November 2012. On 30 May 2013, the NFI awarded a second grant of 1.5 million NOK (ca. $257,000) for the purpose of developing the game, followed by another 2 million NOK (ca. $336,000) a year later.

A campaign to crowd-fund the game on Kickstarter began on 8 February 2013, with a minimal goal of $850,000. Although game's intended full title has always been Dreamfall Chapters, the developers had used the subtitle The Longest Journey during the Kickstarter campaign to improve brand recognition. They estimated the necessary budget for the project to be about $1 million (compared to the $5 million budget of Dreamfall and roughly $2–3 million of TLJ) and planned to supplement the Kickstarter money with further grants and personal funds. Prior to starting the campaign, RTG spent months analyzing previous successful Kickstarter campaigns, particularly Project Eternity and Broken Sword: The Serpent's Curse, to better plan their own project. Dreamfall Сhapters reached its minimal funding goal on 16 February, much quicker than the developers had anticipated, and concluded on 10 March with $1,538,425 raised, or 180% of the initial goal. Additionally, over $34,000 was raised via PayPal during the Kickstarter campaign, and Red Thread Games continued to collect funds through PayPal until 10 October 2014, when pre-orders for the game were opened.

Upon reaching the initial Kickstarter funding goal, several stretch goals were set to encourage additional funding. The goals achieved included Linux and Mac support, an expanded storyline, several new locations, an improved soundtrack, an interactive comic book, French- and German-language versions, and director's commentary. The ultimate stretch goal, unlocked at $2 million, was The Longest Journey Home, a traditional 2D point-and-click adventure game starring April Ryan, that would bridge the ten-year time gap between The Longest Journey and Dreamfall and extend to after Chapters to conclude her storyline. Had this goal been reached, Red Thread Games would have begun working on The Longest Journey Home immediately after Chapters, but since it was not, the plans for the game have been put on indefinite hold. Shortly before the release of the last episode of Chapters, Tørnquist had stated that "The Longest Journey Home will probably never happen... At least not for a long, long time."

=== Production ===
The first playable prototype of Dreamfall Chapters had been produced concurrently with the ongoing Kickstarter campaign and was used to record in-game footage to attract additional funding. Adoption of a cost-saving third-party engine, Unity 4, has enabled the developers to iterate much faster on Chapters than on the original Dreamfall, which took six months to produce a prototype. Furthermore, RTG set out to minimize the in-house development costs, producing only a few key game systems (conversations, story flags, decision points, the social feature) and otherwise relying on either the native Unity technology (animation, physics), assets from the Asset Store (foliage, model libraries, shaders, full-screen filters, etc.), or third-party tools (Playmaker, NGUI, Daikon Forge). The resources saved this way were instead invested into the game content, such as levels, character designs, and special effects. Among the biggest challenges faced by the developers were the GUI and control scheme (a pure point-and-click interface was implemented early on but scrapped after the testers found it impractical) and the pathfinding AI for the NPCs.

RTG showcased a working build of the game on 22 June 2013 at the Rezzed expo in Birmingham, presenting their concept of "game spaces" and approach to story-relevant choices, including the social feature that allows online players to learn about others' decisions. The level demonstrated was an area of Europolis corresponding to modern-day Prague. By late September 2013, RTG completed the vertical slice of the game, implementing all of its core features in a 20–30 minute-long demo, which was shown to the public at Journeycon, a fan convention taking place in Oslo on 23 November 2013. The demo covered a single level, Friar's Keep, and Kian Alvane's escape from it. Also at Journeycon, Red Thread Games announced that the game's soundtrack is composed by Simon Poole, the lead sound designer of Dreamfall. The pre-alpha milestone was reached on 6 December 2013, with the alpha and beta stages planned for spring and late summer 2014, respectively. In March 2014 (at the Game Developers Conference and the EGX Rezzed expo), RTG revealed a new level from the alpha version, showing Zoë Castillo in Storytime at the very start of the game. Work on the beta version began in May 2014, and the first "book" (prologue, two chapters, and an interlude) was feature complete by mid-June. After returning to an episodic video game format in June 2014, Red Thread Games released Book One, Reborn, as the first episode of Chapters on 21 October 2014.

On 26 August 2014, RTG announced a musical competition among Kickstarter backers and other fans, who were asked to submit soundtrack pieces to be included in the finished game. This announcement sparked a controversy regarding "exploiting unpaid [fan] labor", and the contest was canceled the next day by the developers.

The development of Book Two, Rebels, took longer than Red Thread Games had anticipated. Its initial release date was projected to 24 February 2015, but due to its larger scope, technical challenges associated with creating a framework for an episodic game, and the prolonged testing cycle necessary for the choice-and-consequence subsystem, it was delayed until 10 March, and then again until March 12, when critical bugs were discovered and required another day of testing. Although no major changes were made to the core plot of the game since its conception, player feedback to Book One "factored into" the near-complete rewrite of Book Two dialogue.

Despite the extended testing of Book Two, its first released version contained a bug that corrupted several choice-and-consequence flags, which had a negative impact on the reception of Book Three, Realms. Voice recording for the third episode took place simultaneously in Los Angeles, New York City and London and was completed on 20 May 2015, shortly before the Book's subtitle had been announced. For various reasons, several developers, including the design director Martin Bruusgaard, who was on a parental leave, did not participate in the creation of Book Three, with only eight RTG employees working on the game full-time, assisted by several part-timers and freelancers.

Since the first three books had suffered from graphical performance problems, RTG decided to develop Book Four in Unity 5 and to retroactively upgrade the previous Books to the new engine version in July 2015. The entire porting process took four months and cost the company between $100,000 and $150,000, due to a combination of factors, such as having to adopt new tools, to reapply all lighting effects to work with Unity's new "Enlighten" system, and to rewrite all shaders and scripts from scratch for the new engine version. Several engine patches that fixed critical errors introduced new bugs instead, eventually forcing the team to stop all work on Book Four until the finished port of the first three Books was released to Steam on 23 November 2015.

The production of the game was completed on 17 June 2016, with the release of Book Five. RTG has, however, promised long-term technical support for the game, with four developers and several freelancers dedicated to the task in the months following the release. The patches planned for early 2017 included the German translation update for Books Four and Five, the remaining in-game backer rewards, and the Final Cut update that "upgrades the game to match the console versions".

At the time of the Kickstarter campaign, the developers planned for it to become the final game in what they called "the Dreamer Cycle", but not in The Longest Journey series as a whole. This had changed during development, however, and Book Five was presented as the conclusion to the entire saga upon release. In October 2019, Red Thread Games once again reiterated that "for various reasons, including licensing terms", they were not working on any projects in The Longest Journey/Dreamfall series.

=== Casting ===
Many characters from the earlier The Longest Journey and Dreamfall were re-cast for the third game in the series, including both returning playable characters. Although Zoë Castillo's original voice actress, Ellie Conrad-Leigh, expressed readiness to reprise her role, she was voiced by Charlotte Ritchie in Chapters instead. Likewise, Nicholas Boulton voiced Kian Alvane, taking over from Gavin O'Connor. Sarah Hamilton, April Ryan's voice actress in the previous games, was announced to return in Chapters during the Kickstarter campaign, but is not credited in the final version. Returning actors included Roger Raines and Ralph Byers, with the former reprising his role as Crow, and the latter as both Brian Westhouse and Roper Klacks. The last playable character of Chapters, Saga, was voiced by Ava Khan, Eleanor Matsuura, and Susan Brown as a teenager, an adult, and an old woman (Lady Alvane), respectively.

=== Porting ===
The primary target platforms of the game are Microsoft Windows, OS X and Linux, because the developers believe "that's where [...] The Longest Journey fans are". At Gamescom 2014, RTG announced that the PlayStation 4 port would be the first console version to be released and would remain a PS4 exclusive for some time. It would be possible to play the game on PlayStation Vita through the Remote Play functionality of PS4, but its RAM requirements make a direct Vita port impossible. At the same time, RTG was working on an Xbox One port, as well, but the then-current Microsoft policy prevented them from publishing previously PS4-exclusive games on that console. Nonetheless, when the console release was finally announced, publisher Deep Silver confirmed that both PS4 and Xbox One versions would be released simultaneously with the Final Cut for the PC, on 24 March 2017, which was later pushed back to 5 May for the console versions and to 21 July for the PC versions (Windows, Mac, Linux). The developers stated that the console ports had not been feasible until the game was upgraded to Unity 5.

Nintendo had approached Red Thread Games about a possible port of Dreamfall Chapters to Wii U immediately after the preproduction began, but it was not until July 2013 that the studio requested and received a dev kit to start working on the Wii U version. The developers considered the Wii U port "secondary" to the main target platforms. Porting the game to iOS and Android devices was one of the Kickstarter stretch goals that was not reached. Additional platforms, such as tablet computers and SteamOS, were also under consideration. During the pre-production, the developers experimented with the Oculus Rift virtual reality technology and, by April 2015, had a beta version running on it that had never been publicly released.

=== Localization ===
The game was originally written in English, with the Norwegian, German, and French translations confirmed, although as of April 2018 (version 5.7.4.4), the Steam version only contains English and German voice-overs and English, German, and French subtitles. Dreamfall Chapters was translated into German by the Vienna-based studio White Rabbit Interactive, and into French, by the Parisian Words of Magic; German voice-overs were recorded by the Hamburg-based Studio Mühl. The German voice-overs for Book Three were released six weeks after the English release, partly because each episode contains 25 to 50 thousand spoken words, and partly because the developers did not lock down the dialogue until several weeks before the release. Marion von Stengel, who voiced Zoë in the German localization of the original Dreamfall, reprised her role. Initially, CDP.pl had plans to release the Polish translation, but dropped it after the game returned to the episodic format.

== Releases ==
Release timeline
Episode	Release date
Book One: Reborn	21 October 2014
Book Two: Rebels	12 March 2015
Book Three: Realms	25 June 2015
Book Four: Revelations	3 December 2015
Book Five: Redux	17 June 2016
The Final Cut	PS4, XONE: 5 May 2017; PC: 21 July 2017

Dreamfall Chapters was initially announced as an Episodic video game, but this idea was scrapped in favor of a full-length game when the pre-production started in 2012, because the developers felt that extended breaks between chapters would have negatively affected the story flow and pacing. However, faced with mounting production costs, RTG decided in June 2014 to return to the episodic format, and the first "book", subtitled Reborn, was released on 21 October 2014. The subtitle of Book Two was announced on 26 November 2014. The subtitle of Book Three was announced on 22 May 2015, and its release date, one month later. Book Four's subtitle was announced via Twitter and Facebook in late September, and its release date, on 30 November 2015. The subtitle and the release date of the fifth and final Book was announced via Kickstarter on 6 April and 9 June 2016, respectively.

Originally, the episodes were distributed digitally on platforms such as Steam, where the game was cleared on the Greenlight process on 17 April 2013. Individual episodes have never been sold separately, but only as part of a complete season pass. Munich-based EuroVideo Medien had released an exclusive retail PC version of the game in Germany in 2014, containing Book One and a Steam season pass key. After the release of the fifth and final episode, Red Thread Games started working on the updated and final version of the entire game. This version was released on 5 May 2017 for PlayStation 4 and Xbox One by publisher Deep Silver, and on 21 July for Windows, OS X, and Linux, where it was subtitled The Final Cut.

A number of limited boxed editions were additionally offered as incentives to the supporters on Kickstarter, ranging from the simple Collector's Edition to the expansive "Draic Kin Edition", containing a variety of digital and physical bonus materials. These physical rewards shipped with the physical copies of The Final Cut. The master disc for the physical version was tested, approved, and sent into production in February 2018. Basic collector's editions have been shipped to backers throughout spring and summer 2018, but more expansive boxed editions could not be shipped before November 2019 due to delays in physical rewards production. The final batch of physical editions has been shipped to backers on 2 March 2020.

== Reception ==
Dreamfall Chapters

Aggregate score
Aggregator	Score
Metacritic	PC: 71/100; PS4: 67/100; XONE: 77/100

Review score
Publication	Score
Adventure Gamers	2.5/5

Dreamfall Chapters received "mixed or average" reviews from critics for the PC and PlayStation 4 versions, while the Xbox One version received "generally favorable" reviews, according to review aggregator website Metacritic. Ragnar Tørnquist reported in April 2019 that Dreamfall Chapters had performed "very well" commercially, with sales above 500,000 units. He noted that "at least 50 per cent of the audience are women", a percentage similar to that of The Longest Journey.

Upon reviewing all five Books on PC for the Adventure Gamers website, Emily Morganti concluded that "Chapters is worth playing to see how [The Longest Journey] saga ends but doesn't hold up as a standalone adventure". While praising the game for its visuals and likeable characters, she had described the plot as "convoluted" and the gameplay, as "often dull or frustrating", and commented that the plot branching "doesn't live up to its potential".
