= Red Thread Games =

Norwegian video game developer

- Industry: Video games
- Founded: September 2012; 13 years ago
- Founder: Ragnar Tørnquist
- Headquarters: Oslo, Norway
- Key people: Martin Bruusgaard; Rakel Johnsen; Quintin Pan; Audun Tørnquist
- Products: Draugen; Dreamfall Chapters; Dustborn
- Number of employees: 15 (2025)
- Website: redthreadgames.com

Red Thread Games is a Norwegian video game developer based in Oslo. Their first release was Dreamfall Chapters, the episodic sequel to Dreamfall: The Longest Journey, released in five episodes between 2014 and 2016.

The team consists of several veterans from the Norwegian game industry, primarily former employees of Funcom. The team has previously worked on The Longest Journey, Dreamfall, Age of Conan, The Secret World and other titles.

== History ==
Red Thread Games (RTG) was founded in September 2012 by Ragnar Tørnquist, creator of The Longest Journey and Dreamfall sagas, and The Secret World and Anarchy Online universes.

On 8 February 2013, a Kickstarter campaign was launched for Dreamfall Chapters, a sequel to Dreamfall: The Longest Journey, which closed at USD$1,538,425, almost doubling their goal of $850,000, and later receiving further funding from the Norwegian Film Institute. On 30 October, RTG announced that they had begun working on a new game titled Draugen, a first-person survival horror set in the 1920s Norway. The game was later released on 30 May 2019 to average reviews from critics on the review aggregation site Metacritic.

Since 2016, the company has been working on Svalbard, a self-described "polar-punk role-playing game" taking place on the Norwegian archipelago of Svalbard for which the game is named.

In 2023, the company began working on the untitled Project M, an action-adventure role-playing game.

On 20 August 2024, the company released Dustborn, a story-driven action-adventure game. Dustborn received average reviews from critics on Metacritic.

In 2025, the company announced Hello Sunshine, a survival role-playing game set in a post-apocalyptic world.

== Games ==
- Dreamfall Chapters (2014–2017)
- Draugen (2019)
- Dustborn (2024)
- Hello Sunshine (TBA)
- Svalbard (TBA)
- Project M (TBA)
