= Legacy: Dark Shadows =

2004 adventure video game

- Developer: Razbor Studios
- Publisher: GMX Media
- Composer: Davor Maričić
- Platform: Windows
- Release: November 29, 2004
- Genre: Adventure

Legacy: Dark Shadows is an adventure video game reminiscent of the game The Longest Journey and released in 2004.

== Gameplay ==
The game is mouse-driven; a traditional point-and-click from the third-person perspective. Left-clicking the mouse allows the player to move across the screen, talking to other characters, and investigating objects, while right-clicks open Ren's inventory.

== Plot ==
The game takes place in the year 2138, and includes ties to the 1942 Battle of Stalingrad. You play as Ren Silver, a private investigator, has discovered that your journalist friend, Ted, has been kidnapped while researching a story. Ren has to solve the mystery. Throughout the game, the player can sometimes control a character named Jack Black. The plot has elements of Blade Runner, The Fifth Element, "Johnny Mnemonic", and Alien, while the landscape has a bleak, postapocalyptic feel.

== Development ==
The development team chose to include a female protagonist at least partly due to the trend seen in adventure games of that era such as The Longest Journey and Syberia. To balance this, they made the antagonist male. According to lead designer Davorin Horak, "the game was redesigned almost three times from the original concept", causing it to be postponed.

== Reception ==
The game has a Metacritic score of 41% based on 16 critic reviews.

Tap Repeatedly was forgiving to Legacy, writing that it "isn't a bad game...a lot of the issues—older graphics engine, bad voice acting and clichéd story—are simply the trappings of a shoestring budget." Gamer's Hell wrote "It tries so hard to mimic great adventure games like that of The Longest Journey but, sadly, only does so graphically which isn't a good thing. GameSpot concluded "Legacy: Dark Shadows feels cheap and amateurish in every way, and playing it can be a numbing experience." Worth Playing decided that Legacy wasn't, writing "[It's] not fun. It is not interesting, it is not dramatic or stylish or atmospheric"

Background music and FX took much of the accolades, work of Croatian musician and producer Davor Maričić, closely reviewed by old-games.com: "I truly enjoyed the background music. It was low-key and unobtrusive enough that when I was sitting there trying to figure out what I needed to do next, it didn't clash with what my brain was trying to do. I actually found myself humming along with Beethoven's Fifth while checking out the Ares Hotel lobby or just enjoying the serene, 2001: A Space Odyssey-like music used for the asteroid sequence." Original music score is electronic genre, mostly lush synthesizer pad based new-age ambient music but also a techno instrumental compositions for active scenes. Song names as Hotel Mars, Launching Pad and DigiCathedral are illustrating a scenes where used.
