= Dustborn =

2024 video game

- Developer: Red Thread Games
- Publisher: Spotlight by Quantic Dream
- Director: Ragnar Tørnquist
- Producer: Rodica Enciu
- Designer: Martin Bruusgaard
- Programmer: Audun Tørnquist
- Artist: Christoffer Grav
- Writer: Ragnar Tørnquist
- Composer: Simon Poole
- Engine: Unity
- Platforms: macOS; PlayStation 4; PlayStation 5; Windows; Xbox One; Xbox Series X/S
- Release: PlayStation 4, PlayStation 5, Windows, Xbox One, Xbox Series X/S; August 20, 2024; macOS; July 8, 2025
- Genre: Action-adventure
- Mode: Single-player

Dustborn is an action-adventure video game developed by Red Thread Games and published by Quantic Dream on August 20, 2024.

== Gameplay ==
The game is primarily built around player versus environment (PvE) combat involving the player using the power of their language and voices to combat enemies. The game also features Guitar Hero-style rhythm minigames.

== Plot ==
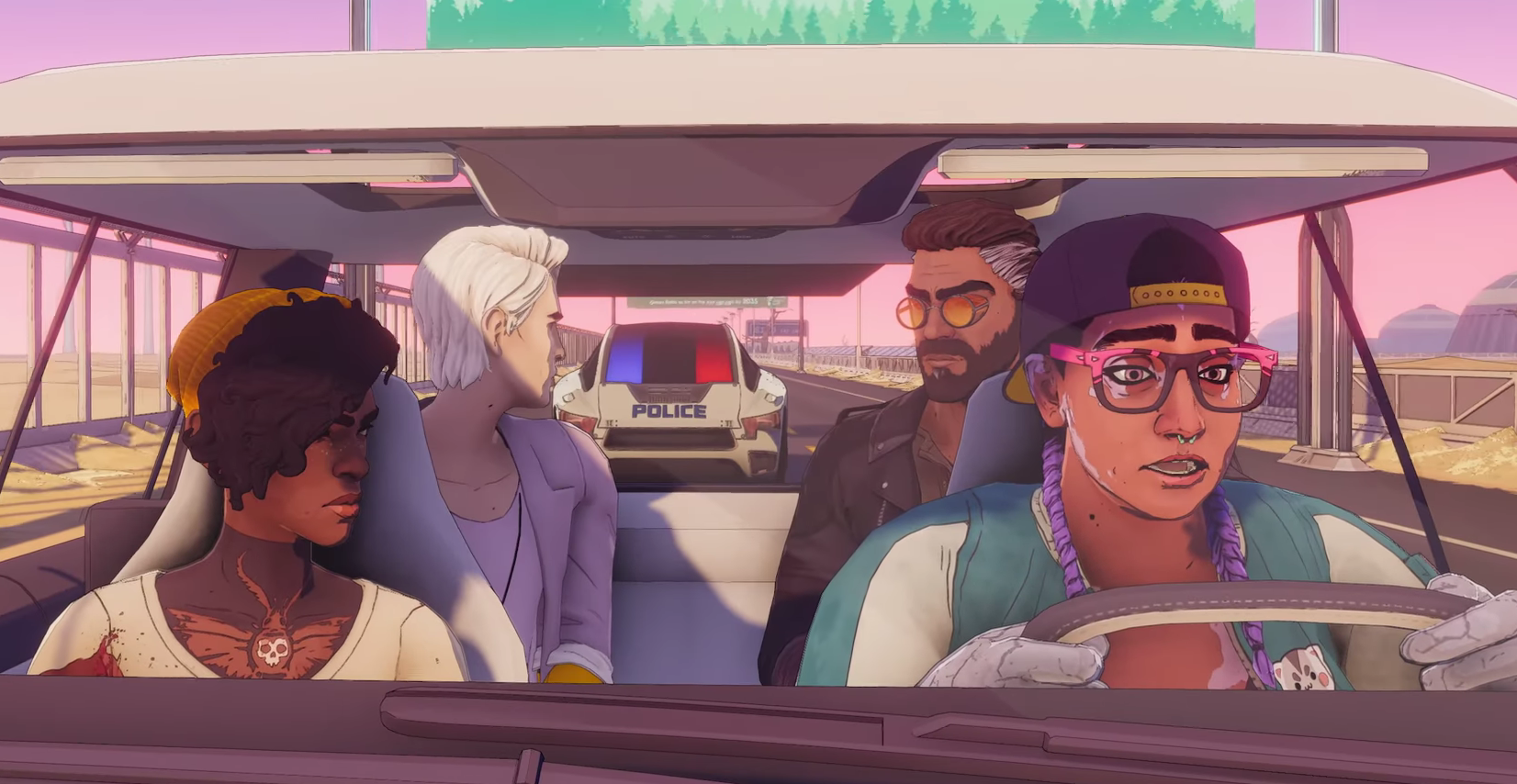
Main Dustborn characters, from left: Pax, Noam, Theo, Sai

In the game's alternate reality, John F. Kennedy survived his assassination and established the militarized police force, Justice, to protect the United States from domestic threats. Decades later, Samuel Ward became president and twisted Justice's original purpose to consolidate his power, allowing him to enact draconian laws on the United States, now known as the American Republic. In the year 2000, an event known as the Broadcast spread mind-altering "Echoes" throughout the country and turned a small percentage of the population into Anomals, Protolanguage-wielding people who can use unique powers known as Vocals to influence people and reality. The government enacted martial law and suspended presidential elections while Justice rounded up anyone discovered to be an Anomal.

In the year 2030, the protagonist Pax (Dominique Tipper) is an Anomal living in Pacifica, a country that was once the state of California before seceding from the Republic. Although she sustains herself with minimum wage work and small cons, she seeks to escape to a place where Anomals have rights. A scientist from the Weave resistance, Jacob, recruits Pax for a job to deliver Puritan Protolanguage data to the Weave in exchange for safe haven in Nova Scotia. Pax and her Anomal friends, Noam and Sai, team up with the Weave operative Theo in order to steal data from the Puritans. The crew breaks into the Puritan headquarters, fights against the organization's cyborgs, and copies the data onto a datakey. The crew then drives to La Torre in order to dispose of their getaway car and obtain a tour bus, which is part of the crew's cover story as a punk rock band. The crew also recruits a robot, later known as Caretaker, to drive the bus. Throughout the journey, Pax encounters a Puritan, Axiom, in her dreams. He condemns the negative effect of language on human civilization and beckons her to bring him the ultimate Vocal.

Once the crew enters the American Republic, they recruit various Anomals to their cause while trying to evade Justice and the Puritans. The new recruits include Ziggy in Oregon, Eli in Nevada, Girl and Sol in Colorado, Ophelia in the remains of Kansas, and Nainai in Michigan. The crew also discovers that Justice is secretly kidnapping children to turn into Anomals and that Justice caused the Broadcast for their Protolanguage experiments. The mission faces several setbacks, such as encounters with Justice, the Puritans' constant pursuit, and Sai unexpectedly leaving the crew. In an encounter with Justice in Rotown, Pax receives a near-fatal injury from Prefect Kim, Caretaker sacrifices themself to save Pax, and the datakey is lost. Kim and Praetor Walker confine Pax to a Justice-affiliated hospital, where they interrogate her and are surprised to learn of their superiors' Anomal experiments. When the Puritans attack the hospital, Walker releases Pax, who is then rescued by Sai, Ziggy, and Eli. Once they reunite with the rest of the crew, Sai reveals that Justice blackmailed her to give them the datakey, but she instead gives the crew a secret copy of the datakey before leaving to oppose the government in her own way.

At Schoodic Point, the crew gets into a three-way battle against Justice and the Puritans. At the pier, the Puritan Overseer takes the non-combatants of the crew hostage in order to force Pax to give up the datakey. Pax realizes that her usual brute-force approach to Protolanguage cannot resolve this situation, so she instead uses the empathy she developed throughout the journey to affirm her friends' paths in life. This results in a Vocal that encourages her friends, giving Theo the bravery to defeat most of the Puritans with an EMP device. Axiom kills Theo and attempts to steal Pax's powers, but Girl concentrates a multitude of Echoes into Pax's womb area. This allows Pax to unleash a powerful Vocal to defeat Axiom, allowing the crew to mourn Theo, complete the mission, and find their paths in life. After the credits, Caretaker's head is reactivated among a group of other robots.

== Development ==
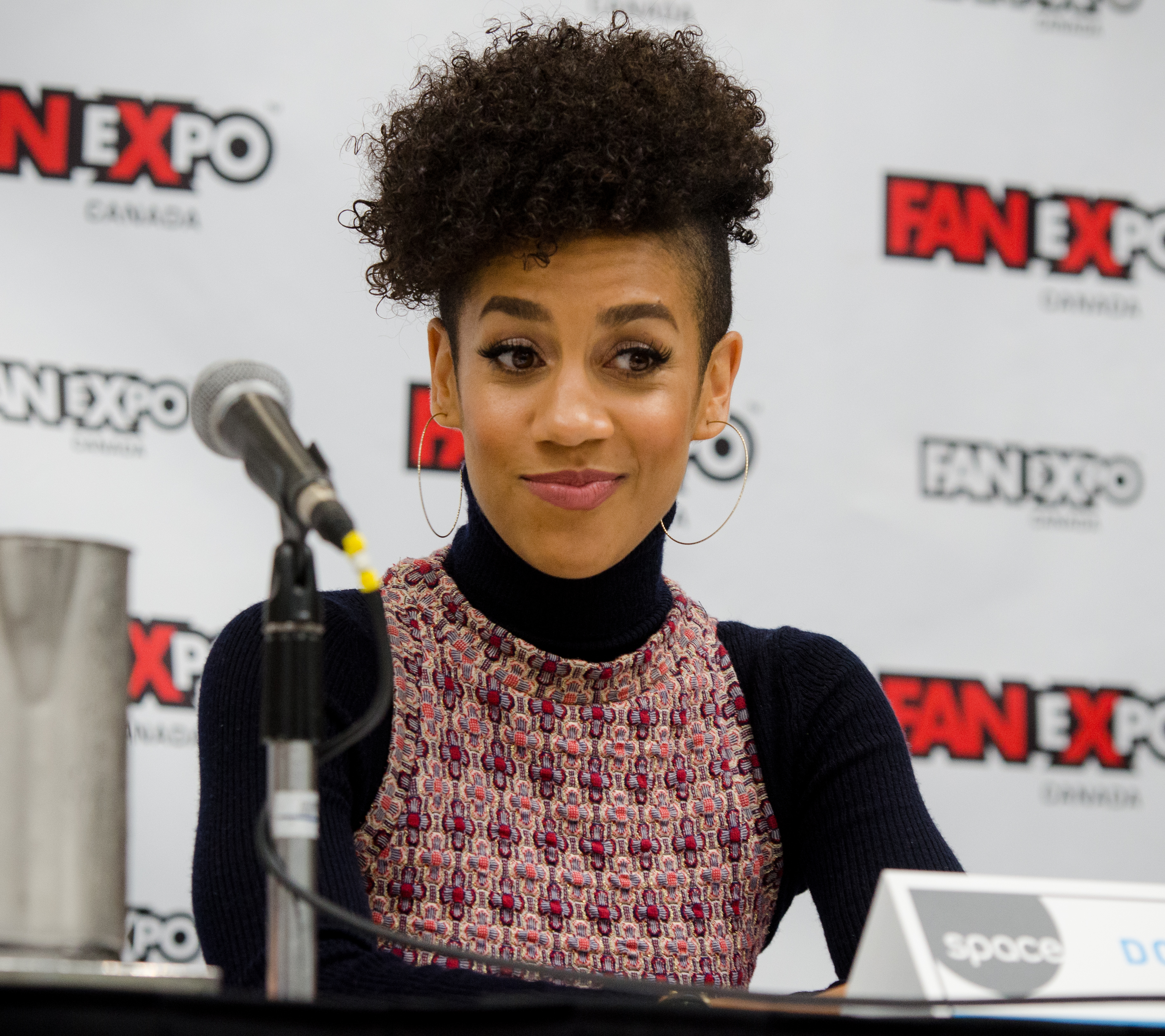
Dominique Tipper stars as Pax.

Dustborn was announced at the Future Games Show conference in 2020 and slated to release the next year. The game's showcase featured a cast of culturally and ethnically diverse characters. After the announcement, the game received some negative feedback from people who believe developers are being forced to make their games more diverse, though creative director Ragnar Tørnquist denied the cast's diversity was due to outside pressure, stating that "publishers and developers are just understanding more that there's a wider and more diverse audience".

The game was developed using the Unity engine and the team wrote their custom shaders to accomplish the comic book-inspired look. Red Thread Games and Quantic Dream privately funded most of the game budget, with the developer also receiving over 13.6 million NOK (around 1.4 million USD) from the Norwegian Film Institute. Additionally, the game received a grant of €150,000 from the EU's Creative Europe project, and 300,000 NOK from Viken Filmsenter.

The game released on August 20, 2024, on PlayStation 4, PlayStation 5, Windows, Xbox One, and Xbox Series X/S. The macOS version of the game was released on July 8, 2025. Following Dustborn's launch and culture war backlash to the game, the developer released a statement condemning the "tidal wave of hate and abuse" aimed towards them and the game. The publisher released a similar statement affirming their support for the developer and their "zero-tolerance policy for threats, hate speech, or harassment" on their social media platforms.

== Reception ==
=== Critical reception ===
Reception

Aggregate scores
Aggregator	Score
Metacritic	(PS5) 68/100 (XSXS) 68/100 (PC) 68/100
OpenCritic	47% recommend

Review scores
Publication	Score
Famitsu	32/40
GameSpot	5/10
IGN	7/10
The Guardian	3/5

Dustborn received "mixed or average" reviews, according to review aggregator Metacritic, and 47% of critics recommended the game, according to OpenCritic. In Japan, four critics from Famitsu gave the game a total score of 32 out of 40.

Malindy Hetfeld, writing for The Guardian, rated it 3 out of 5. Hetfeld noted the difficult balance as the game attempts "to alternate between fun moments, activism and drama – a balance it ultimately can't hit." Hetfeld enjoyed the game most when it "leans into the silliness of its supernatural storyline" calling it "the equivalent of an interactive Marvel movie, and that is OK." Rachel Weber of IGN rated it 7 out of 10: "Dustborn brings angst to a comic book caper about an alternate-reality America, and you'll get an emotional ride with a few exciting punk performances if you stick with it through a slow start".

GameSpot reviewer Mark Delaney, rating the game 5 out of 10, called Dustborn "one of the most overtly political and, more specifically, unapologetically leftist games I've ever played", which he felt "makes its early hours very interesting, but it falls apart in the second half due to monotonous combat and a final few chapters that undo the stronger first half". GameRant commented in its 2 out of 5 review, that while "the diverse cast's goal of fighting back is noble", the "dialogue is irritating and never lets up" and that the "bloated narrative is full of poor or meaningless beats".

=== Sales ===
PC Gamer's Andy Chalk described Dustborn's launch sales as "apparently modest". Eurogamer.pt reported the game appeared to launch poorly on Steam with a peak of 83 concurrent players. In an interview with Gamer.no, director Ragnar Tørnquist said that the game sales have significantly exceeded those reported online but fallen below the studio's internal short-term expectations.

=== Awards ===
Dustborn was nominated in the Outstanding Video Game category at the 36th GLAAD Media Awards.
