= The Secret World =

2012 video game

- Regular version cover art
- Developer: Funcom
- Publishers: Electronic Arts (2012 - 2017); Funcom (2017 - present)
- Director: Ragnar Tørnquist
- Producers: Ragnar Tørnquist; Anne Lise Waal
- Designers: Martin Bruusgaard; Joel Bylos
- Programmer: Øystein Eftevaag
- Artist: Christer Sveen
- Writers: Ragnar Tørnquist; Dag Scheve
- Composers: Marc Canham; Simon Poole; Magnus Beite
- Engine: DreamWorld
- Platform: Microsoft Windows
- Release: NA/EU: July 3, 2012
- Genre: MMORPG
- Mode: Multiplayer

The Secret World is a massively multiplayer online role-playing video game with a dark urban fantasy theme, in which players play characters defending the world from occult threats.

== Overview ==
Ragnar Tørnquist led development of the initial game for Funcom. The Secret World uses a subscription-optional, buy-to-play business model, requiring players only to buy the game with no additional subscription fees, with additional benefits to those members still paying a subscription.

In 2017, The Secret World was relaunched as Secret World Legends.

== Gameplay ==
The player is standing in one of the game's three optional starting locations, Seoul.

=== Starting a character ===
The Secret World allows the player to control a character or avatar within a game world in third- or first-person view. This character can be used for exploration, fighting monsters, completing missions, and interacting with players and non-player characters (NPCs).

The game starts with the player choosing a default "dimension" while playing solo. This also decides which battlegroup the player is placed in within Player versus Player battlegrounds. The game makes use of a single server technology that allows players to meet up with people from any of the different servers, both in regular gameplay as well as instances and dungeons.

The Secret World character starts the game by joining one of three "factions": the Illuminati, the Templars or the Dragon. This determines the character's home city as well as a set of faction-specific missions and their allies in PvP. After choosing their faction, the player is taken to the character creator where they can choose their character's gender, height, face, hair, makeup and clothing.

=== Combat and abilities ===
The game offers players a choice between tab-targeted combat or a more action-based combat where the target is selected with a crosshair in the middle of the screen. Abilities can be activated by pressing a certain hotkey and most abilities can also be activated while the character is moving. The player can choose from 9 different weapon types, divided in three categories: melee, magic and ranged. Melee weapons include: blades, hammers and fist weapons. Magic weapons include: blood magic, chaos magic and elementalism. Ranged weapons include: shotguns, pistols and assault rifles. Note: After the game relaunched, the player may only choose from a few predefined classes.

The player can wield two of these weapons simultaneously and is also allowed 7 active and 7 passive abilities at a time. Active abilities are further divided between builders and consumers. Builders build resources either on the target or the player, which are then consumed by a consumer ability. The amount of resource consumed then decides the amount of damage that the consumer ability does.

The game has a total of 525 abilities which are stored in an "ability wheel" that allows the character to change their class and weapon types, as well as customize their character's roles, at any point in time. (Note: There are a few situations such as combat where players cannot change class.) This differs from traditional MMOs that lock the player to a class at the initial character creation phase. There is also an auxiliary wheel which includes a different type of weapons, referred to as auxiliary weapons. These auxiliary weapons can be unlocked by playing specific missions and they allow the player to add an additional active and passive ability for this auxiliary weapon. A total of 5 auxiliary weapons have been released: flamethrower, rocket launcher, quantum brace, chainsaw and whip.

Abilities can be further improved by augments gainable by doing a specific set of missions referred to as scenarios. Augments are divided in four categories: damage, support, healing and survivability. Augments add direct increases to abilities such as increasing a certain stat or effect for this specific ability. Completing issue 11 also unlocks a special "ultimate ability" that does a high amount of damage to up to 30 enemies in a 9-metre radius. This ability has to be recharged by killing mobs and can only be used on a mob once every ten minutes. Ultimate abilities have been disabled in PvP.

=== Missions ===
The missions come in several varieties. The main plot follows a faction-driven quest storyline. Characters can also take on a main mission, a dungeon mission, faction-limited side quests, and three open side quests. Some missions involve fetching items or fighting monsters; others include a variety of puzzles that are quasi-alternate reality games that require "searching the Internet" for clues with an in-game browser. Investigation missions have players find facts and solve problems, and differ from the hack-and-slash missions. Sabotage missions require players to navigate areas, preferably without being spotted by enemies or automated traps.

The Secret World also supports groupings of characters called "cabals", each made up of members from a single faction, although many players have opted to develop their own off-game groupings to unite characters from different factions.

=== Player vs player ===
The game has four main modes of player vs player (PvP) content:

- The Fusang Projects, a perpetual PvP zone based on capturing and holding "facilities" against the other two factions
- El Dorado, a timed "capture the flag" style match with four "relics" that must be controlled to gain points for the team
- Stonehenge, a timed "king of the hill" style three faction match with five players per team
- Shambala, a two-team faction-independent team deathmatch

PvP awarded "White Marks of Venice", which could be exchanged for "Black Marks of Venice" at an exchange rate of 100 to 1. The game later eliminated PvP-specific currency, and PvP minigames now award Black Bullion and Marks of the Pantheon, the same as dungeons and missions. The only exception for this is the Shambala mode, which also awards special PvP specific signets that can be bound to gear.

== Synopsis ==
=== Setting ===
The game features an original present-day setting created by Funcom, which includes "magic, myths, conspiracies and dark horrors."

In the game, the player's character, living in the present day, joins one of three world-controlling secret societies attempting to repel, mitigate or exploit the attack of malign immortal beings in coastal Maine, rural Egypt, Transylvania, a quarantined section of Tokyo, a utopian community outside South Africa's Cape Town and (planned) a section of the river Congo; and to advance their society's agenda over that of the others.

The setting is inspired from horror fiction and folklore. Novice players begin in a New England, then move to Egypt, Transylvania, and then Tokyo. Mission content bleeds into player faction headquarters in London, Seoul and the Dumbo neighborhood of Brooklyn, and into the game's transport network, along the subterranean branches of Yggdrasil in Agartha.

Tørnquist stated that "there are no aliens or science fiction elements" in it. He also denied any connection to The Longest Journey.

The game is set in the "modern day real world" but also incorporates pieces of ancient mythologies, real and alternative history, urban legends, and pop culture, and ties them into an original backstory. The latter is said to go back in time for 100 million years and encompass extinct ancient civilizations.

The players will assume the roles of supernatural heroes who participate in a "future war between good and evil", fighting dark monsters that threaten the modern world. Tørnquist identified the genre of the story as dark fantasy, featuring vampires, demons and zombies. The player is free to travel across different locations of the world (both real, like London, New York and Seoul, and mythical, such as Agartha, the legendary city located within Hollow Earth, and the Hell dimension) and even in time, to pursue the overall plot and investigate new mysteries in connection to the dark invasion. The overall plot has a conclusion but the designers also leave room for future issues and expansions.

H. P. Lovecraft's works, the Indiana Jones franchise and Stephen King's novels are major inspirations for the game's settings and storylines.

=== Plot ===
A bee flies into the character's sleeping mouth one month after an occult terrorist attack in Tokyo subways. In dreams the character is offered survival of the fast-approaching End of Days in return for service to an Elder God, while a good and bad angel advise the player to defy the god or else make wary use of it. The character awakes with magical powers which the character spends a week learning to control before being recruited as an agent either politely by the Templars, menacingly by the Illuminati, or incomprehensibly by the Dragon. The character then travels to London, Brooklyn or Seoul to receive training and endure a variously induced hypnotic flashback of the Tokyo disaster. After choosing weapons they are sent to the first of several supernatural disaster zones around the world to advance their society's interests.

The first three playfields are on fictional Solomon Island, Maine, walled off by occult fog and besieged by zombies, with heavy influences from H.P. Lovecraft and Stephen King (references to King's work includes "Flagg's Pharmacy", the "Overlook Motel", and "Jack & Wendy's Bed & Breakfast"). NPCs have names from King's work like "Creed" and "Bannerman"). Scandinavian Draug and ancient Mayan invaders reveal the legacy of an ancient war fought on a mountain to control what is beneath it. A black liquid called the "filth" bubbles up from beneath the mountain, rapidly corrupting the minds and bodies of all creatures who contact it and gradually revealed to consist of the dreams of old gods. The player's investigation centers upon a man calling himself Beaumont who is working with the world's most popular New Age cult, Morninglight, actually bent on feeding the world to eldritch beings. Also present on the island are the Order of Phoenician Sailors, a resentful global pirate/mercenary army, and the in-house soldiers and scientists of Orochi, the world's largest tech conglomerate. The player gradually discovers the legendary identities of both Beaumont and of a sword which, brought by fishermen to the island, initiated the horrors there. Forging an alliance with the island's Native American community, the character enlists ancient powers to defeat Beaumont. Dungeons accessible from the island include: the site of a capsized tanker further offshore haunted by a small Cthulhu avatar; a part of the Hell Dimensions where a human bent on redeeming Hell is held captive; and the island's ancient past where the war over the mountain is fought.

After facing Beaumont, the character is sent to the Valley of the Sun God, a fictional tourist area in Egypt. One map in the area hides a hidden ancient city built to worship an evil god, while the other boasts a small modern town situated above the as-yet-undiscovered ruins of ancient Thinis. Recently, blights resembling the "seven plagues" of Egypt have manifested, along with a Filth eruption associated with the return of the cult of historic sun-god Aten and, indeed, of the historical pharaoh Akhenaten, father of Tutankhamen and initiator of Ancient Egypt's short-lived experiment with monotheist Aten worship. The player is assisted by a mafia of black-marketeering mummies, by a millennia-old paramilitary resistance movement named the Marya, by a cagey eyewitness of old-testament events wielding what seems to be Aaron's Rod, and by Akhenaten's rebellious high priest and the seven of his own children he sacrificed in order to create seven avatars of the Egyptian pantheon, in the form of giant Sentinel statues. Dungeons include another Hell Dimension and an ancient Aten temple teeming with what's left of some very unwise Orochi scientists.

The next location the character visits is Bacaş County, Transylvania, where an ancient human-fairy truce has been broken by an army of vampires besieging the local town. The plot reveals this siege is at the request of their queen Mara, concealing her work to exploit another Filth source and gateway into other dimensions originally opened by the Orochi Group using Emma, a captive teenaged psychic. The vampires are being opposed by the Drăculești, a group founded by Vlad Dracula to hunt and fight supernatural creatures. The Filth is also present in the Bacaş County and it is corrupting the land and its inhabitants.

The character later revisits the three main locations, and they slowly learn that all three major catastrophes are heavily linked to the Orochi Group and its mysterious leaders, Samuel Chandra and Lily Engel. The player faces Lily in Transylvania and her true identity—Lilith—is revealed. Lily escapes to Kaidan, and the character is sent to Venice by their handler. In Venice they discover that the group known as the Council of Venice, responsible for keeping the peace in the secret world, has been corrupted.

Finally the character goes to Kaidan, which is located in Tokyo, Japan. A bomb was released in the Kaidan subway, which started the spread of the Filth and the destruction of the world. The headquarters of the Orochi Group is also located in Kaidan, as is the Black Signal, the digital mind of a Filth cultist who now directs the Filth creatures in Kaidan. Several groups are fighting for control of Kaidan and it is up the player character to discover the mysteries of Tokyo, find out who released the bomb, and face Lily and the Orochi Group. The Tokyo areas utilize many Japanese legends, such as the Namahage.

== Development ==
After announcing the development of The Secret World, Funcom project director Jørgen Tharaldsen informed the press that the game uses the same engine as Age of Conan. According to Funcom, the game would blend elements of MMO gameplay with alternate reality gaming (ARG) and social networking.

At GDC 2009, Tørnquist gave an interview to GameSpot regarding The Secret World, revealing more about its gameplay. There would be neither levels, nor classes in the game; instead, the character building would be skill-based. This way, the developers planned to avoid level grinding, allowing new players to join the game more easily. The player characters would be customizable to a large degree, particularly in their choice of clothing (except in PvP, where players must wear faction-specific uniforms), weapons (which range from shotguns to swords and can be customized and upgraded), and the supernatural powers they acquire. Combat against computer-controlled monsters would be one of the game's central points and will require more of player's attention than contemporary MMORPGs. Death in game results in the character returning as an "anima" and they have the option of returning to their body or respawning at a variety of resurrection locations. The players will be able to form teams to fight together but in an earlier blog posting, Tørnquist assured that the game can also be played in single-player mode, should a player choose not to play with a group. According to him, the game is story-driven and there is an overarching linear plot, as well as numerous side-quests, ranging from investigation to sabotage and hunting, since diversity of the gameplay will be another central point.

In an interview with GameSpot at the 2009 Penny Arcade Expo, Tørnquist and the lead designer Martin Bruusgaard revealed which playable factions ("secret societies") will be available in the game. The factions are: the London-based Templars, pious zealots "who would burn an entire village down to get their hands on one demon"; the New York City-based Illuminati, Machiavellian pragmatists who "believe that it's a tough world where only the strongest will survive"; and the Seoul-based "Dragon", who take a neutral stance between the other two and are "all about deceiving, orchestrating chaos, and waiting patiently for its time". A personality test to determine the players' inclination towards one of the factions was made available on the official The Secret World website soon after the reveal. It would be impossible to change factions without creating a new character. Additionally, players are able to create their own guilds, known as "cabals" in-game, affiliated with one of the main factions. All players' actions in the game are contribute to their ranking in their respective guilds and factions. The same interview revealed that PvP areas of the game are located in the region called Agartha inside the hollow Earth, where the players will fight for the invaluable resource known as "anima". This idea was dropped during closed beta due to unspecified reasons. Large scale PvP has later been revealed to take place in big persistent warzones. Control of these warzones has an effect on the rest of the players of a controlling faction, and provides bonus experience and other perks. There are also small mini-games in iconic locations such as Shambhala, El Dorado, and Stonehenge.

The pre-production of the game originally known as Cabal (and The Entire World Online in the earliest concepts) started in 2002, but in mid-2003, most of the working team was transferred to the development of Dreamfall. Cabal was to be set in the same universe as the later The Secret World but in the 1920s instead of the contemporary period, with H. P. Lovecraft's works and the Indiana Jones franchise being major inspirations. The idea of setting the game in the 1920s was scrapped after lengthy discussions, in order to make the game more accessible for modern players.

The work on The Secret World was resumed in 2006, after Dreamfall shipped, with many of the latter's designers (including Ragnar Tørnquist) playing key roles in the former's development. The Secret World was produced at the Funcom studios in Oslo, Montreal and Beijing. In August 2008, it was stated that the development team consisted of people previously involved in the development of Dreamfall, Anarchy Online, Age of Conan, EverQuest II, and The Longest Journey. In November Funcom stated that 70 people were working on the project. The Secret World uses the proprietary DreamWorld Engine.

On September 29, 2009, Funcom announced a reduction of 20% of its staff, resulting in "significant delay" for the release of The Secret World. On January 10, 2011, Electronic Arts announced that it will co-publish The Secret World with Funcom. Funcom told VG247 that they were "leaving [their] options open" in regards to the 360 version.

On August 30, 2011, beta testing sign-up became available. On February 21, 2012, Funcom announced that The Secret World would be released on June 19. The first public beta test "Kingsmouth Calling" went live on May 11, 2012, available to all pre-purchasers of the game. The second public beta test "Hell Raised" went live on June 15, 2012, available to pre-purchasers and invited players. The company also revealed that over 750,000 gamers had applied to beta-test the game, significantly higher than for their previous MMO, Age of Conan: Hyborian Adventures.

On January 29, 2014, Norwegian economic crime unit Økokrim launched an investigation into suspected infringement of the provisions of the Securities Trading Act concerning the 2012 launch of The Secret World.

== Marketing ==
=== Alternate reality games ===
The first promotional material appeared on May 8, 2007, when a picture was leaked into the internet, containing a poem, a Knights Templar seal, and several sentences in Spanish, Norwegian, French, German and Hebrew. When solved, the poem led to a series of internet pages, one of them with a riddle, and eventually to the newly created official forum. This was also the start of an alternate reality game.

The websites led to a Flash page with a countdown timer that uses Eastern Arabic numerals. The timer would presumably have reached zero at 12:00 AM on December 21, 2012, adjusted for the location of Funcom headquarters. The date is the end of the Mayan calendar cycle, which is notable in Maya mythology. A puzzle was also included on the same page, hinting at the destruction of three major cities. Solving the puzzle gave the players 5 sets of coordinates, revealed several early screenshots from the game and marked the end of the first ARG.

Between 2007 and 2014 Funcom has created several alternate reality games such as: Dark Days Are Coming, Two Lines Twine, The End of Days and Division 66. The alternate reality games were created using Twitter, Flickr, 8tracks and several websites created by Funcom such as Kingsmouth and the official game forums. One of these ARGs, called The End of Days, engaged more than 600,000 players from 22 countries and also had real-life quests in seven cities around the world. The ARGs provided the players with more insight in the lore and story behind The Secret World and also in-game rewards.

=== Promotion ===
A first teaser trailer featuring the Dragon faction was released on April 7, 2009, during the GDC 2009. A second teaser featuring the Templar faction was released on September 4, 2009. A teaser presenting the fictitious town of Kingsmouth was released on February 2, 2010. On March 23, 2010 (i.e. 10 days after the GDC 2010 of San Francisco, California), a short teaser was released, showing some extremely brief in-game sequences and announcing the release of a bigger teaser on March 25, 2010. This last one showed some fights in Kingsmouth. Most available teasers can be viewed on the game's homepage, however, GameSpot's interviews with Ragnar Tørnquist, on the various factions within the game, included scenes from teaser trailers.

In 2011, Funcom started working on a Facebook app called The Secret War. The first stage, asking players to choose their faction, aired on August 30, 2011, along with the long-awaited beta sign-up for the actual game. As of April 2012, The Secret War was active. The game was available for seven weeks and saw the player fight over control of the world as members of one of three factions.

There were also seven special weekly missions such as The Battle for Africa that provided rewards for all players of specific faction. Players were able to earn the chance for a guaranteed slot in the beta, as well as a trip to Montreal, Quebec, Canada to play the game. Actions in The Secret War gained special items to be used with characters at game launch. Over 250,000 players participated in the game.

Funcom also had a panel advertising The Secret World at PAX East 2012 where people could play the game for the first time in preparation of the first beta test. Funcom hosted a total of three beta weekends: Kingsmouth Calling Part 1, Kingsmouth Calling Part 2 and Hell Raised. These beta weekends allowed players to explore the two area of the game, play the first two dungeons and experience the different introduction sequences for each of the three factions.

On May 25, 2012, Funcom announced moving the release date to July 3, 2012.

=== The film ===
The game was officially used in the film IRL and plays an important role in it, showing the main character's internal perception of the world and helps him find love.

== Release ==
=== Pre-order ===
Funcom offered a number of in-game content packs available as a pre-order bonus by registering at the official website. These ranged from additional in-game pets and weapons to a life-time subscription and discount at the in-game store. The exact contents of the bonus packs depend on the location of purchase. Players who pre-ordered the game gained early access to the game servers, before the official release date.

=== Updates ===
The game has received regular updates called "issues", that added new missions, weapons, abilities, features and storylines. Originally these issues were supposed to be released monthly, but when the game went from Pay-to-Play to a Buy-to-Play policy, this changed. The first four issues were incorporated in the base game, while Issue #5, "The Vanishing of Tyler Freeborn", was provided free of charge only to players who had purchased the game prior to January 2013. Subsequent updates have been offered at a slower pace, usually taking several months for new issues to be released. They are available as paid-for DLC for players. Funcom does not provide these issues free to its subscribers and lifetime users, instead including 1,200 bonus points as part of its subscription and thus offering the option of only buying the DLCs users are interested in. After some concern by the subscribers and lifetime members, Funcom stated that the subscribers/lifetime members would never have to pay more than 1,200 bonus points for new issues. As of December 2016, a total of 15 issues had been released.

== Reception ==
Reception

Aggregate score
Aggregator	Score
Metacritic	74/100 (Secret World Legends) 76/100

Review scores
Publication	Score
1Up.com	A−
Eurogamer	7/10
GameSpot	7.5/10
GameSpy	3.5/5
GameTrailers	7.3/10
IGN	7.9/10
PC Gamer (US)	69%

The Secret World has a 74/100 critic rating on Metacritic, indicating that it has mixed reviews.

IGN praised the presentation and also said that while The Secret World starts off strong, it loses steam afterwards. GameSpot praised The Secret World's puzzles, storytelling, and atmosphere, but criticized its lack of PvP content at launch.

Jonathan Deesing of G4 TV gave The Secret World a score of 2.5/5 during closed beta testing of the game. Reviewer Heather Mitchell praised the game's unusual setting and puzzle quests. PC Gamer praised the high ambitions and colourful appearance of the game, but criticised the uninspired combat and the lack of agency of the silent protagonist, giving the game 69%.

On August 28, 2012, Funcom announced that The Secret World had sold 200,000 copies, below company's expectations. Funcom claimed that mixed and poor reviews, coupled with the proximity of Diablo III, Guild Wars 2 and World of Warcraft: Mists of Pandaria launches, cut the sales of the game. After switching to a buy-to-play model in December 2012, Funcom reported that the player activity had increased by 400 percent as a result of the model change, and that an additional 70,000 units had been sold over the course of two months.

== Spin-offs ==
=== The Black Watchmen Universe ===
In 2014, Human Equation acquired license rights for Funcom's Black Watchmen intellectual property (IP), which is a part of The Secret World universe. The company intended to create a permanent alternate reality game with the Black Watchmen license as well as an accompanying comic book. The license was eventually transferred to a new start-up company called Alice & Smith and crowdfunding for the game started in 2014. On September 13, 2014, the game was successfully funded on Kickstarter. The game was released on June 25, 2015, on Steam and currently has two seasons, and several pieces of DLC, all of which can be bought separately. Additionally Alice & Smith have also expanded the Black Watchmen universe with two spin-offs games: Ahnayro and Nite Team 4. No prior knowledge of the Secret World universe is required to play the Black Watchmen games.

=== The Park ===
In August 2015, Funcom announced a new spin-off of The Secret World, in the form of The Park, a short experimental horror game created by Funcom. The Park is set in The Secret World universe and uses both locations and characters seen in the main game. The game was released on October 27, 2015. A Secret World tie-in mission called The Seven Silences continues the story of the Park and was available every year during Halloween. The mission is currently not available in Secret World Legends.

=== Hide and Shriek ===
Hide and Shriek is a one vs. one competitive multiplayer game set in The Secret World universe, which was announced in May 2016. The game was built with the Unreal 4 engine and was released on October 25, 2016. In the game, players can also collect items called 'stories' which deal with characters and themes from The Secret World. The game went free-to-play in October 2017.

=== Secret World Legends ===
As of March 2017, the producers of the game have announced that it will be rebuilt and relaunched as Secret World Legends, but that the older game and accounts will still remain functional and playable. It was launched 4 months later. Several new additions were added to the game post-launch, such as: the Dawn of the Morning Light storyline, the Agent System and the Occult Defense Scenario. None of this content is playable in the original version of the game.

=== Television show ===
In August 2017, American film production company Infinitum Nihil announced production of a television series adaptation of The Secret World.

=== Moons of Madness ===
Funcom and Rock Pocket Games have announced that another spin-off game will be released on Microsoft Windows, Xbox One, and PlayStation 4 during Halloween 2019. The game was revealed to be Moons of Madness, a first-person, story-driven cosmic horror game, which takes place on Mars, and deals with the Secret World's Orochi Group.

=== The Secret World Roleplaying Game ===
At the end of 2021, Star Anvil Studios announced a tabletop role-playing game based on The Secret World. A Kickstarter campaign is also announced to follow in 2022.
