= Norwegian Film Commission =

Norwegian national film commission

- Formation: 2020-09-24
- Location: Bergen, Norway
- Members: Association of Film Commissioners International
- Leader: Meghan Beaton
- Website: https://www.norwegianfilm.com

The Norwegian Film Commission is Norway’s national film commission, and is a government body supporting international film and television productions planning to film in Norway. The organisation provides guidance on filming locations and production logistics and works to attract inward production to Norway.

A national film commission for Norway was established in Bergen in 2003, but was reorganised as part of the Norwegian Film Institute in 2008. The Norwegian Film Commission was established as an independent body in 2020, with its main office in Bergen, Norway. Canadian-born Meghan Beaton was appointed as leader.

In January 2025, Tor Inge Hjemdal was appointed chairman of the board of the Norwegian Film Commission.

The Norwegian Film Commission is a member of the Association of Film Commissioners International.

In 2022, the Norwegian Film Commission and the British Film Commission signed a memorandum of understanding intended to strengthen collaboration between the UK and Norwegian screen industries and facilitate production between the two territories.

There are also regional film commissions in Norway: Western Norway Film Commission, Eastern Norway Film Commission, Midgard Film Commission Norway, Arktisk Film Norway and Oslo Film Commission.

== Selected international productions ==
This list is not exhaustive.

- Black Widow (2021) – includes on-location filming in Norway
- Dune (2021) – scenes set on the planet Caladan were filmed in Stadlandet, Norway
- Ex Machina (2014) – filmed in part at Juvet Landscape Hotel in Norway
- Mission: Impossible – Dead Reckoning Part One (2023) – filmed in parts of Møre og Romsdal, including Hellesylt and Romsdalen
- Mission: Impossible – Fallout (2018) – filmed at Preikestolen (Pulpit Rock) in Norway
- Mission: Impossible – The Final Reckoning (2025) – scenes filmed in Svalbard, Norway
- No Time to Die (2021) – scenes filmed in Norway, including the Atlantic Ocean Road
- Succession (2018–2023) – season four episodes were filmed in Norway
- Superman (2025) – scenes filmed in Svalbard, Norway
- Troll (2022) – filmed at multiple locations in Norway
- Troll 2 (2025) – sequel to Troll, with production covered by Norwegian and international media
