= Legions of the North =

Studio album by Månegarm
- Released: 26 June 2013
- Genre: Viking metal
- Length: 50:42
- Label: Napalm

Månegarm chronology
| Nattväsen (2009) | Legions of the North (2013) | Månegarm (2015) |

Legions of the North is the seventh studio album by the Swedish Viking metal band Månegarm. It was released in 2013.

== Track listing ==
Legions of the North track listing
| No. | Title | Length |
|---|---|---|
| 1. | "Arise" (Intro) | 2:26 |
| 2. | "Legions of the North" | 4:43 |
| 3. | "Eternity Awaits" | 5:16 |
| 4. | "Helvegr" ("Path to the Underworld") | 0:16 |
| 5. | "Hordes of Hel" | 5:06 |
| 6. | "Tor Hjälpe" | 5:04 |
| 7. | "Vigverk" | 0:36 |
| 8. | "Sons of War" | 5:35 |
| 9. | "Echoes from the Past" | 6:40 |
| 10. | "Fallen" | 5:21 |
| 11. | "Forged in Fire" | 6:13 |
| 12. | "Raadh" | 3:16 |
| Total length: | | 50:42 |

== Charts ==
Chart performance for Legions of the North
| Chart (2021) | Peak position |
|---|---|
| Swedish Hard Rock Albums (Sverigetopplistan) | 18 |
| Swedish Vinyl Albums (Sverigetopplistan) | 9 |
