= Draugen (video game) =

2019 video game

- Developer: Red Thread Games
- Publisher: Red Thread Games
- Director: Ragnar Tørnquist
- Designer: Quintin Pan
- Artist: Christoffer Grav
- Writer: Ragnar Tørnquist
- Composer: Simon Poole
- Engine: Unreal Engine 4
- Platforms: Windows; PlayStation 4 Xbox One
- Release: Windows; 29 May 2019; PlayStation 4, Xbox One; 21 February 2020
- Genre: Adventure
- Mode: Single-player

Draugen is a 2019 first-person mystery adventure video game developed by Red Thread Games for Microsoft Windows, PlayStation 4, and Xbox One. Set in the 1920s, the plot entails an American naturalist visiting a Norwegian fishing village to find that the town's population has vanished. The player must explore the town, discover its fate and survive the night. The game emphasizes the more sinister aspects of Norwegian folklore.

== Plot ==
Edward Harden arrives in the remote village of Graavik with his young companion, Alice. Harden is in pursuit of his missing sister Elizabeth, whose last known location appears to be the household of the Fretland family of Graavik. Edward and Alice find the village completely deserted and seek out the Fretland farmhouse. With the owners missing, the pair settle in and wait for the arrival of the natives. Searching the house, Edward finds a tailor's dummy, wearing his sister's characteristic scarf, convincing him that Elizabeth had been or perhaps still is in the vicinity. During their first night, Edward catches a glimpse of a shadow at his window and gives chase, believing the figure to be his sister. After a frantic pursuit through the hillside, he is found by Alice, who notes that their boat, tethered at the coast, has now disappeared, stranding them in the village.

The pair explore the village the next day, primarily for news of Elizabeth, but also to uncover the eerie events preceding the disappearance of the villagers. They learn that Graavik used to be a mining town, ran by twin brothers Johan and Fredrik Fretland. An unknown quarrel drew the brothers apart and their hostility to each other was reflected among the rest of the community. Ultimately, the death of Johan's daughter Ruth, for which Johan accuses his nephew Simon, breaks any remaining family bonds completely and sparks open conflict. Edward and Alice come upon an unnamed villager near the church who hung himself. Later on, Edward finds Anna's diary entries showing concern for Ruth, who had apparently been making secret visits somewhere on the island and hoarding seemingly ancient Viking artifacts.

In the meantime, Edward finds various articles of clothing, like a hat, a pair of gloves and a brooch, which he asserts to belong to his sister and left behind as breadcrumbs for him to find her. Also, tension begins to rise between the scientifically minded and skeptical Edward and the empathetic and compassionate Alice, who insists Edward to break out of his obsession of seeking his sister and piece together the tragedy of Graavik. On their fourth day in the village, the pair hear the ringing of the church bell, which they race to investigate. They enter the boarded up and abandoned church, and find the records of recent births and deaths. Most of the deaths are attributed to being caused by a local curse. Finding a recent, unnamed burial, Edward is violently distraught and digs up the deceased – not his sister but a stranger. His relief is rebuked by a furious Alice, who castigates his increasingly unhinged behavior and callousness to the world around him. An incandescent Edward banishes Alice in rage, who disintegrates into thin air – revealing that she was a figment of Edward's imagination. Remorseful, Edward gives chase and begs Alice's forgiveness. At the Fretland farmhouse, Alice hurls herself off of the roof to Edward's horror. At the sight of her limp body, Edward is rebuked by a large angelic statue, insisting he's not alone. Later, the angel and Alice, now revived, try to dissuade Edward from his obsession but Edward casts them out forever. Now alone, Edward unlocks the final room of the house, finding the deceased body of his host, Anna Fretland. Edwards also finds a letter written by a bereaved and distraught Johan, promising closure, and a lighter which Edward claims to belong to Elizabeth.

Concluding that Elizabeth came to Graavik to write the story of the Fretlands, he makes way to the hill, first to Frederik's farmhouse where he finds correspondence from Fretlands' British investor threatening financial ruin. Inside the Fretland mine, numerous Viking artifacts and treasures of significant archaeological value were discovered whose public disclosure would have forced the shutdown of mining operations. Such shutdown would have buried the Fretlands in debt. It was this event that drove the Fretlands apart and sowed distrust between Johan and Fredrik. Fredrik covered up the find with the collaboration of his investor, but a later cave-in tragedy shut mining operations down anyway and ruined him financially. Johan interpreted Ruth's death by misadventure at the cliffside as revenge by his brother's family, possibly burned Frederik's house down in retaliation, and sparked open conflict in town. The town came to believe these tragic events were the result of a curse placed upon them for disturbing and stealing the Viking artifacts from their burial site in the mine. Presumably, the final survivor of this conflict buried the dead in the church cemetery and then committed suicide by hanging himself from a nearby tree.

Edward finally breaches the mine and comes to what appears to be the Viking hoard. However, as he attempts to uncover it, the mine begins to collapse and Edward barely makes it out. He is immediately called at by his sister's voice, who summons him back to the Fretland farmhouse. Following the voice to the room where he'd been sleeping for the past week, Edward's sanity frays and he treats the tailor's mannequin, which he had been adorning with his sister's belongings, as his sister. He suddenly realizes that the articles turn extremely old. Suddenly, Edward is confronted with Alice and the angel – who break the news to him. Elizabeth Harden had died in infancy, drowned in a pond. Edward, 11 at the time, brought her dead body to his mother, who later drowned herself, only to be followed by his father who shot himself. Edward's relentless pursuit for Elizabeth was a coping mechanism for his trauma. Alice and the angel, his antithesis as a young optimistic and compassionate, and a manifestation of his lapsed faith, thus accompanied him at all times.

Reconciling with his loss, Edward and Alice witness their missing boat return from the Fjord. The two leave Graavik with Alice suggesting that Edward write a book about what happened to the town and its people.

== Gameplay ==
Draugen follows Edward Harden and Lissie, searching for Edward's missing sister Betty in Graavik. It is split into six chapters, where each chapter represents one day. During that time, Edward and Lissie go further into the mysteries by finding letters, exploring the areas, and putting all the clues together. In its noir-styled story narrative, Draugen deals with certain themes, including psychology, isolation, and trauma. There is an interactive component, where besides having dialogue choices, the players are able to engage with the world though objects (drawing in a personal journal, playing on a piano, ringing bells, and others).

== Development ==
The game was announced in 2013, being developed on Unity and intended to be released on Windows, Mac, Linux, and next-generation consoles. The development was supported by grants from the Norwegian Film Institute totaling 4 million NOK (approx. $375,000), as well as a grant of 150,000 Euros from the EU's Creative Europe project. The game also received 150,000 NOK (approx. $14,000) from Viken Filmsenter.

The game was released on 29 May 2019 for Windows and on 21 February 2020 for PlayStation 4 and Xbox One.

== Reception ==
=== Critical response ===
Reception

Aggregate scores
Aggregator	Score
Metacritic	72/100 (Xbox One); 73/100 (PC); 75/100 (PS4)
OpenCritic	48% recommend

The game received an aggregate score of 73/100, indicating "mixed or average" reviews on Metacritic.
