= April Ryan (The Longest Journey) =

- The Longest Journey character
- April Ryan in Dreamfall: The Longest Journey
- First game: The Longest Journey (1999)
- Created by: Ragnar Tørnquist
- Voiced by: English: Sarah Hamilton; Andrea Bowen (young); Norwegian: Synnøve Svabø (The Longest Journey); Petronella Barker (Dreamfall); Frida Olaussen (young)

April Ryan is a character from the adventure game The Longest Journey (1999) and its sequel Dreamfall: The Longest Journey (2006). In the former, she is the protagonist, and in the latter, one of the three primary characters. April has been praised as one of the most memorable female characters in the history of adventure games. In both games she is voiced by American actress Sarah Hamilton.

== Character design ==
The Longest Journey writer Ragnar Tørnquist compared April in TLJ to "young inexperienced" Frodo Baggins, whereas in Dreamfall she developed into an "Aragorn type character". Journalist Randy Sluganski described her adventure in TLJ as "a rite of passage; a maturation from the indecisive, self-deprecating teenage years into a hesitant adulthood that is at first shunned and then gradually embraced". One of the traits that helped the player to identify and empathize with April Ryan—a much praised concept—was that she kept a diary. Unlike the diary of Zoë Castillo, Dreamfall's protagonist, April's diary contains more self-revelations and allows much deeper insight in its owner's character and background, allowing the player to trace her personal development.

Tørnquist stated that he did not create April as a female protagonist to reach the female adventure gaming audience, but because a female lead was a better fit to a story where progress is as much about empathy and helping people out. Tørnquist, with his co-writer of Dreamfall Dag Sheve, commented that in terms of losing faith (a recurring theme in the game), April went further than the other two primary characters, resulting in her "actual death". Tørnquist, however, stressed the ambiguity of the term "actual death", refused to explicitly confirm her status, and added that "her influence is not fully played out. It is her story, all the way through".

== Appearances ==
April Ryan is a human daughter of the White of the Draic Kin (Dragons), the Mother. It is unknown who her father is, or even if she has one. She is a painter and artist in the world of Stark. Whether April was born in Arcadia or Stark is not known; but shortly after her birth on 14 April 2191 by Stark reckoning, she was adopted into a normal human family that lived somewhere in the continental United States. Her adoptive father was often inebriated and beat her as a child. His antipathy is later revealed to stem from the fact that he dropped April on the floor when she was very little, which severely injured her legs, with doctors doubting that she ever would be able to walk. To suppress his guilt, he started ignoring her henceforth; but as she made a completely unexpected and quick recovery, he felt that she was mocking him and began to blame her for his own misery. Despite April's bad relationship with her father, she has always been on good terms with her adoptive mother and rarely had quarrels with her two brothers, Danny and Owen. After turning 18 April left her adoptive family forever, after having one last row with her father, wherein he was injured. Without a word of goodbye to her mother, April left for Newport, an industrial megapolis.

At the beginning of The Longest Journey, as a resident of the technology-driven world, Stark, she discovers that she is a Shifter - a person with the power to move between worlds. Her journey begins when she unwittingly transports herself to the magical Arcadia. She is the daughter of the White Dragon, as she herself felt a connection between the two of them and it is confirmed by the White Dragon. Moreover, her Stark parents adopted her. April is prophesied from all four species holding the parts of the disc as being the savior who will restore the balance, only to finally break it.

April (described on the promotional posters with a tagline "Rebel, Emissary, Chosen") returns in Dreamfall as one of the three protagonists of the game. After her success in The Longest Journey, she was left without a purpose, and chose to join the effort to liberate the Northlands from the occupation by the Azadi (Persian: freedom) Empire. She has turned her back on her former world of Stark and considers herself a citizen of Arcadia now.

== Critical reception ==
April Ryan's character was met with positive reception. Journalist Sam Maggs in the book The Fangirl's Guide to the Universe called her "Maybe the most memorable character in all of adventure gaming", praising both her look and her "no-nonsense attitude". The magazine Hyper called her as a "revelation" in their 2002 review of the first game, feeling that she displayed genuine human emotions, motives and vulnerabilities, further calling her "one of the most sympathetic and engaging game characters in years." Randy Sluganski of Just Adventure felt that she elevated The Longest Journey above other titles in its genre, praising the character's growth through the game and her tackling of themes of "adolescence, femininity, and sexuality". Sean Molloy of GamePro heavily praised her character, calling "one of the strongest, most well-written, and most likeable heroines" of the adventure game genre. GameSpot writer Kevin VanOrd described her as a special character due to being so "ordinary", especially in the context of being a female protagonist "in a medium not exactly known for complex portrayals of women." This sentiment was echoed by Richard Eisenbeis of Kotaku, who additionally noted her humor and noting that while she was thrust into a world she wasn't prepared for her growth along the course of The Longest Journey "makes her one of the 'realest' characters I have ever come across in gaming."

Much discussion about April has also revolved around her characterization between the first and second game with more mixed response. Escapist Magazine's Tom Rhodes stated that he felt a deep connection to the character in The Longest Journey, adding that unlike other adventure game protagonists such as Monkey Island's Guybrush Threepwood or Grim Fandango's Manny Calavera, she "seemed real to me, as if one day I might shake her hand, begging her to regale me with her tales of excitement and adventure." However this sentiment was not carried over to Dreamfall, describing her character as becoming a "dour goth chick" in contrast to her growth from the previous game, pushing him to actively dislike her and questioning "What happened?" Jakub Kralka of benchmark.pl expressed similar sentiments, stating that while April did not exude personal charm, her intellect and sharp sense of humor set her apart from other adventure game protagonists. However he lamented that her "girlish" image and partly her character became "gloomy, dark as if she has a burden to carry," though added that while the more attractive Zoe took on her role from the previous game he held a preference for how outspoken April was. Madeline Carpou of The Mary Sue stated that commonly 18-year-old girls are written as vapid archetypes, however "April completely defies this and comes out of it as one of the most down-to-earth, hilarious protagonists I can think of in games, period." Unlike Rhodes and Karlka however she also stated approval for Dreamfall's approach to her character, finding her "older and jaded" personality to be very relatable.

The college textbook Understanding Video Games: The Essential Introduction used her as an example of female characters in video gaming and representation in the context of video game design and development. In it, they stated that her appearance could at first glance may lead one to conclude she was a "sex object" and passive figure due to her "tight clothes, full breasts, large innocent eyes, and sensuous mouth". However they stated that was far from the truth, and instead noted her independence and resourcefulness as a woman engaging in dangerous action "without depending on men" was equally important to consider for the full picture of her as a character. The book directly refuted the previous book's claim however, and stated that her "sexualized look" was in their belief consistent with depictions of female characters in video games.
