= Månegarm =

Swedish metal band

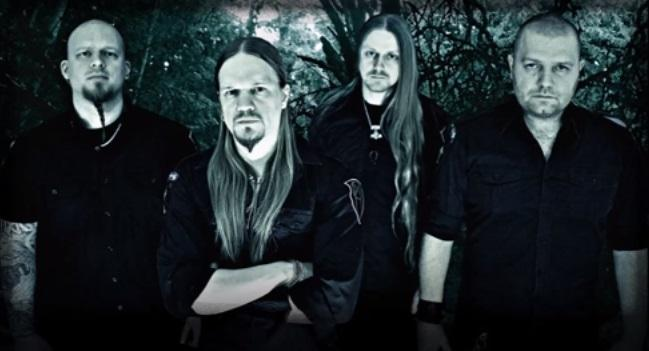
- Left to right: Jonas Almqvist, Erik Grawsiö, Jakob Hallegren, Markus Andé

Background information
- Origin: Norrtälje, Sweden
- Genre: Viking metal
- Years active: 1995–present
- Labels: Napalm, Regain, Black Lodge, Displeased
- Members: Erik Grawsiö; Markus Andé; Jacob Hallegren
- Past members: Jonas Almkvist; Svenne Rosendal; Mårten Matsson; Jonny Wranning; Viktor Hemgren; Janne Liljeqvist
- Website: manegarmsweden.com

Månegarm is a Swedish Viking metal band from Norrtälje. It is named after Mánagarmr, a wolf in Norse mythology.

== History ==
Svenne Rosendal, Jonas Almquist, and Pierre Wilhelmsson formed the band in 1995. After finding guitarist Mårten Matsson and drummer Erik Grawsiö, they began rehearsing as "Antikrist". By 1996, they changed their name to Månegarm, after the wolf of Norse legend. Early that year, they recorded their first demo collection, Vargaresa (Wolf's Journey). After the recording, Rosendal and Matsson left, replaced with Jonny Wranning (vocals) and Markus Andé (guitar).

Second demo Ur Nattvindar incorporated folk elements, including violins and female vocals. They signed to Displeased Records. Wranning left the band and was replaced with Viktor Hemgren. At the end of the year, they went into Sunlight studios to record Nordstjärnans Tidsålder (The Age of the Northstar).

In 2000, they began recording Havets Vargar. Because of difficulties with the studio, they took time off from recording, during which Viktor Hemgren was fired. Grawsiö took over as vocalist along with drumming. During this time, Janne Liljekvist joined full time. The new line up finished recording the album and released it in 2000.

The band's two demos were remastered and released as an album in 2004, with a fourth studio album, Vredens Tid (Age of Wrath), issued in 2005, followed by performances on European festivals that summer. After the acoustic folk music EP Urminnes Hävd (The Forest Sessions) on Displeased, the band signed to Black Lodge, which issued the group's sixth album, Vargstenen (Wolf Stone), in 2007.

Nattväsen was released on 22 October 2009 through Regain Records.

At the end of June/beginning of July 2013 (dates vary depending on territory), they released Legions of the North on Napalm Records.

== Members ==
=== Current ===
- Markus Andé – guitar (1996–present)
- Erik Grawsiö – drums (1996–2008), vocals (2000–present), bass (2010–present)
- Jacob Hallegren – drums (2008–present)

=== Touring members ===
- Martin Björklund – violin, guitar (2015–present)
- Tobias Rydsheim – guitar (2016–present)

=== Former ===
- Svenne Rosendal – vocals (1995–1996)
- Jonny Wranning – vocals (1996)
- Georgios "Gogge" Karalis – vocals (1997)
- Viktor Hemgren – vocals (1997–1999)
- Mårten Matsson – guitars (1995–1996), vocals (1996)
- Pierre Wilhelmsson – bass guitar (1995–2010)
- Jan Liljekvist – violin, cello, flute (2004–2012)
- Jonas "Rune" Almquist – guitars (1995–2016)

== Discography ==
=== Albums ===
Album name	Release	Chart Peak SWE
Nordstjärnans tidsålder	1998	–
Havets vargar	2000	–
Dödsfärd	2003	–
Vredens tid	2005	–
Vargstenen	2007	59
Nattväsen	2009	27
Legions of the North	2013	–
Månegarm	2015	–
Fornaldarsagor	2019	–
Ynglingaättens Öde	2022	–
Edsvuren	2025	–

=== Compilation ===
Album name	Release	Chart Peak SWE	No. of tracks
Vargaresa – The Beginning	2004	8	9

=== EPs ===
Album name	Original release	Re-Release	Chart Peak SWE
Urminnes hävd (The Forest Sessions)	2006	2015	28

=== Single ===
- 2007: "Genom världar nio"
- 2022: En snara av guld

=== Demos ===
- 1996: Vargaresa
- 1997: Ur Nattvindar
