= Dreamfall: The Longest Journey =

2006 video game

- Developer: Funcom
- Publishers: NA: Aspyr; NOR: K.E. Media; UK: Empire Interactive; EU: Micro Application (Xbox)
- Director: Ragnar Tørnquist
- Producer: Øivind Scharning
- Designers: Jarl Schjerverud; Henning Solberg
- Artists: Christer Sveen; Kjetil Hjeldnes
- Writers: Ragnar Tørnquist; Dag Scheve
- Composer: Leon Willett
- Engine: Shark 3D
- Platforms: Microsoft Windows, Xbox
- Release: Microsoft Windows: NA: 17 April 2006; NOR: 28 April 2006; UK: 26 May 2006; Xbox: NA: 18 April 2006; EU: 11 August 2006
- Genre: Adventure
- Mode: Single-player

Dreamfall: The Longest Journey (Bokmål: Drømmefall: Den Lengste Reisen) is an adventure video game developed by Funcom for Microsoft Windows and Xbox platforms in April 2006. In 2007, a sequel entitled Dreamfall Chapters was announced, and Funcom reportedly considered the idea of a massively multiplayer online game set in The Longest Journey universe.

The game is the sequel to Funcom's The Longest Journey, released in 1999, and takes place ten years after the events of the first game. The story focuses on three characters, Zoë Castillo, April Ryan, and Kian Alvane, who live in two parallel worlds: technologically advanced Stark and magical Arcadia. April was the protagonist of the first game, while the other two are new characters. The main storyline follows Zoë, a Stark resident whose investigation of her ex-boyfriend's disappearance and other mysterious occurrences lead her to April. Meanwhile in Arcadia, April battles the villainous Empire of Azadi while Kian, an elite Azadi soldier, is sent to assassinate her. The game features returning characters from its predecessor, such as Brian Westhouse and Gordon Halloway, but playing The Longest Journey is not a prerequisite to understanding its plot.

== Gameplay ==
Focus field allows hotspots to be interacted from afar.

Throughout the game, the player alternately controls four player characters (in chronological order: Brian Westhouse (only for the intro), Zoë, April, and Kian) from a third-person perspective to explore various locations, gather and combine items, and solve puzzles. This advances the story, which is told through cutscenes rendered by the game engine and dialogue with non-player characters.

The interface system is simplistic with no HUD aside from buttons which trigger various interactions (below) when available. The player can either interact directly with characters or listen in via a remote system. It is possible to eavesdrop on certain conversations at a distance, although this is used rarely in the overall plot. Conversations have six options at the most, portrayed on the screen in a vaguely circular fashion. Inventory is a scrolling list on the bottom, with the option to either select, interact, examine, or return after selecting an item.

== Plot ==
=== Background ===
The Longest Journey had established a game world consisting of two parallel "twin" worlds: technology-driven Stark and magic-driven Arcadia, separated and kept apart from each other for over twelve millennia by a succession of godlike Guardians of the Balance. The game was set in 2209 and focused on April Ryan, a Starkian with a rare ability to "Shift" between worlds, who learned that the villainous Vanguard cult had abducted the twelfth Guardian before the thirteenth could take his place, putting the Twin Worlds' existence in peril. In the course of her adventure, she had rescued the old Guardian and learned that she is a daughter of the ancient White Dragon and that the next Guardian is the Vanguard enforcer Gordon Halloway, who had been pursuing her throughout the game. After convincing Gordon to assume the Guardian's duties, April left for Arcadia.

In Dreamfall, many characters refer to the catastrophic "Collapse", which occurred in Stark immediately after the events of TLJ. The Collapse is never described in-game, but supplemental materials and the official website indicate that it saw a complete failure of many advanced technologies, devastating the world's infrastructure. The Collapse coincided with the rise of the theocratic and industrial Empire of Azadi (Persian for "freedom") in Arcadia, which occupied the Arcadian Northlands and the city of Marcuria and began oppressing their non-human residents. This spawned a resistance movement, which April had joined before the events of Dreamfall.

=== Synopsis ===
The story of Dreamfall is presented as a narration of Zoë Castillo, a 20-year-old resident of Casablanca in 2219, who lies in coma and recounts the events that left her in that state. Her account concerns Project Alchera, an international conspiracy led by the Japan-based toy manufacturer WatiCorp, inventors of a lucid dream-inducing technology ("dreamer console") that can be covertly used for mass brainwashing and even murder. One byproduct of their research is a young girl named Faith, whom they used to test the hallucinogenic drug Morpheus as part of their DreamNet technology. After receiving a fatal overdose of Morpheus, Faith managed to transfer her consciousness to the DreamNet mainframe, from where she is able to briefly enter Stark's digital networks, disrupting the worldwide infrastructure with massive amounts of white noise, referred as "static" in the game. (Note: Creative director Ragnar Tørnquist had commented that the effects of Faith's presence on the game world are much graver than shown in the released version and that he was disappointed that he and other writers "didn't manage to really explain what's going on".)

Zoë's story begins when her journalist ex-boyfriend Reza Temiz disappears while investigating Project Alchera. At the same time, Faith starts to haunt her through television screens, urging her to find and to "save" April. Zoë tracks Reza down to Newport, a fictional megapolis on the West Coast where a large part of TLJ took place. After learning about April from her friends, she is captured by Wati agents and forcibly attached to a dreamer console, which has an unexpected effect: when her body falls asleep in Stark, she gains a physical presence in Arcadia and can interact with people and objects there. In Marcuria, she locates and meets April, who refuses to get involved in her search for answers due to the loss of her Shifting powers and to her own obligations as an anti-Azadi resistance leader. Waking up in Newport, Zoë travels to Japan to meet Reza's contact inside Wati who explains Project Alchera to her.

In Arcadia, April spies on Azadi officials' negotiations with a hooded figure known as "the Prophet", whom she pursues to the caves beneath Marcuria. There, she discovers a vortex of dreams stolen from Stark and leaves the city to seek advice from the White Dragon and Gordon Halloway, who assures her that the current events have nothing to do with her. She returns to discover that Zoë was captured by the Azadi and encounters Kian Alvane, who has just arrived in Marcuria on a mission to assassinate April. Unaware of each other's identities, the two engage in a heated argument over Azadi politics that leads him to reexamine the morality of his task. April then frees Zoë but again refuses to assist in her quest, so Zoë instead teams up with Brian Westhouse, another Starkian trapped in Arcadia, and Crow, a talking bird and April's ex-sidekick. Together, they seek out the White Dragon, who teleports Zoë back to April, only for her to witness the Azadi troops sacking the main resistance camp, killing April, and detaining Kian for treason, after he tries to protect April from them.

Waking up in Stark, Zoë learns from her Wati contact that the static had originated from a testing facility near Saint Petersburg where she discovers a record of Faith's final months. Distressed by the video, Zoë returns to Casablanca and meets Faith's creator, the geneticist Helena Chang, who asks her to persuade Faith to die in order to stop the static, which is in the meantime threatening to cause another Collapse. Zoë uses a dreamer console to reach Faith, who reveals that Zoë is also one of Chang's creations before disappearing. Chang then injects Zoë with an overdose of Morpheus, leaving her body in a coma and her consciousness, trapped in the space between the Twin Worlds. In the final shots before the credits, a short television broadcast announces the release of the dreamer consoles three months after the events of the game.

== Development ==
The Norwegian game developer Funcom considered The Longest Journey an important intellectual property, so the plans to make a sequel were greenlit despite the difficulties of marketing an adventure game in the mid-2000s decline in the genre. To appeal better to the gaming market, Dreamfall was developed both for the PC and the Xbox home console, which led to a much more stressful production cycle than the original game. The game had a larger development team (about 30 people) and a larger budget (approximately $5 million) than The Longest Journey. The developers did not consider Dreamfall a direct sequel to The Longest Journey, but rather a "follow-up, set in the same universe, but telling a different story", hence the different title and a new protagonist (Zoë Castillo). The direct sequel would have starred April Ryan in the main role and continued the plot threads started in the first game. In 2013, this sequel was announced as The Longest Journey Home, which would have been produced after Dreamfall Chapters, the sequel to Dreamfall.

In February 2003, Funcom approved the concept for Dreamfall, and members of the original team of The Longest Journey started working on the project. Three months later, Funcom presented text descriptions and concept art drawings. In February 2004, Funcom reported that the game was financed. Three months later, game director Ragnar Tørnquist presented a first look at Dreamfall with a few first "rough" sections at the E3 2004, getting a very good press coverage. IGN was impressed by the "beautiful graphics engine" based on the Shark 3D technology as the "most salient feature", "a wonder to see" and full of "features defining the cutting edge". GameSpot awarded the game as best adventure game of the E3 2004 and reported that Funcom seems to be making use of the "impressive graphics engine" rendering "large and highly detailed environments" to "create the colorful, scenic vistas that the world of The Longest Journey is known for" and pointed out the "focus field" as an all-new interface option.

Originally planned to be released about a year after the E3 2004 presentation, the game was finally released in April 2006. Game director Ragnar Tørnquist attributes difficulties during development to technical issues with the Shark 3D engine (of which he speaks very unfavorably), unexpected programming work, the team's lack of experience and missing knowledge of developing for the Xbox.

=== Themes ===
In their 2008 interview with Rock, Paper, Shotgun, the writers of Dreamfall, Ragnar Tørnquist and Dag Scheve, have repeatedly stressed that faith was the central theme of the game's narrative and outlined a "journey of faith" model that guided the story arcs of every major character (Zoë, April, Kian, and Faith). In this model, every character starts in the state of having faith (which Tørnquist described as "optimism... Or at least acceptance. Accepting how things are and being able to live with that"), e.g. in oneself, in one's abilities or purpose, in love, in God, etc. Upon encountering a challenge, individuals can briefly lose faith, but usually quickly rediscover it. If they keep losing faith, however, they descend further into disillusionment, then hopelessness, and ultimately a spiritual death. At this point, the character must undergo a profound internal transformation or suffer the physical death. According to the writers, Dreamfall advocates for having faith and for improving oneself by continuously rediscovering it in the face of adversity.

Every major character in the game goes through some steps of the above model. Zoë Castillo "makes sacrifices" and suffers disillusionment, but not hopelessness, regaining faith "through the act of destroying Faith [the character]" to complete her journey. Faith is a non-playable character but, nevertheless, a central one, as she personifies and is named after the concept of faith itself. Her faith is in her continuing existence, despite having died and being trapped inside a machine, which prevents her from embracing the necessary transformation, i.e. letting go of life. "In order to save faith, you [as Zoë] have to kill Faith", and with Zoë's help, she can complete her own journey, too. Kian Alvane, meanwhile, "skipped hopelessness" and goes through disillusionment, "a sort of spiritual death", and ultimately a transformation (although according to Tørnquist, parts of his story arc were cut from the game due to time constraints).

April Ryan's arc in Dreamfall begins with her already having lost faith "in herself, in her world, in her friends". Tørnquist justified this development with the impact of the sacrifices she had to make in the original The Longest Journey, for which she had ultimately received no recognition. He commented that despite her strength of character, the 18-year-old April lacked the maturity to appreciate her achievements and her friends on their own merit and to embrace the chance to live her own life from then on. For these reasons, the 28-year-old April in Dreamfall cannot "commit herself to anything" and seeks "easy answers" (e.g. from the Guardian Gordon Halloway), but not finding any causes her to descend into "complete hopelessness", spiritual death, and, finally, to allow her enemies to kill her.

Besides its exploration of faith, Dreamfall contains "commentary on the real world", such as on the "occupation of one nation by another and justifying that". In an interview about the sequel, Tørnquist also stated that "there's definitely a political element to Dreamfall Chapters, as there was to Dreamfall".

=== Release ===
Dreamfall: The Longest Journey was released for Microsoft Windows on 17 April 2006 in the United States and 18 April in Europe, available either on 6 CDs or a single DVD. A Limited Edition of Dreamfall was released, as well, containing the DVD version of the game, a soundtrack EP with four songs by Magnet, and a 92-page hardcover art book entitled The Art of Dreamfall. According to Ragnar Tørnquist, this edition is "an actual limited Limited Edition", since it has only been produced in small numbers. On 23 December 2006, a game demo was released. On 12 January 2007, Dreamfall was made available on Steam. On 30 April 2007, Aspyr announced that a Game of the Year edition would be released to North America on 24 May 2007 and would include The Longest Journey, Dreamfall, and the Dreamfall OST. This release includes three DVDs but no manual. The StarForce copy protection system prevents the use of the boxed version of the game on 64-bit versions of Windows Vista and Windows 7, although this can be circumvented with an unofficial patch which bypasses the software.

The Norwegian release of the game gives the player the option to toggle English or Norwegian voice-overs. Norwegian actress Ingeborg Sundrehagen Raustøl voiced Zoë Castillo in the Norwegian version, while Petronella Barker replaced Synnøve Svabø as the voice of April Ryan.

The Xbox version of the game has been released on 8 April and 11 August 2006 in the US and Europe, respectively, and is backwards compatible with Xbox 360 since June 2006. It was made available as an "Xbox Originals" digital download on Xbox Live on 23 March 2008. The downloadable version is the original Xbox version of the game rather than the Game of the Year edition.

== Audio ==
Most of the music in Dreamfall was composed by Leon Willett, who joined the production team in the last year of its development. Willett spent ten months writing the score, with the biggest challenge being to make it both cohesive and reflecting the multitude of settings in the game. He later commented in an interview, that the story of Dreamfall required "a broad, Hollywood approach" to music and regretted not having a live orchestra to perform it (instead using synthesized performance). Willett also remarked that because of an entirely new premise and more cinematic way of storytelling in Dreamfall, he had rarely considered the music from The Longest Journey as inspiration.

Dreamfall Original Soundtrack was released in August 2006. It contains the original orchestral music composed by Leon Willett for the game, as well as several tracks by other musicians, including the game's lead sound designer Simon Poole and audio director Morten Sørlie. It was nominated in the Best Video Game Score category at the 2006 MTV Video Music Awards but eventually lost to The Elder Scrolls IV: Oblivion score. The most prominent music in the game, featured on the main menu and in the first two game trailers, is a combination of two tracks ("Dreamfall Theme" and "Kian's Theme"). The final track is "Faith", a 2:40-minute long track followed by six minutes of silence, after which a static noise, and the phrase "Find April Ryan... Save her!" (a key phrase from the game) can be heard. Other significant tracks include "Lana and Maud" (heard in the Fringe Cafe in Newport) and "Rush" (from Casablanca towards the end of the game).

Dreamfall: The Longest Journey Original Soundtrack

Soundtrack album by Leon Willett
- Released: June 2, 2006
- Genre: Video game soundtrack
- Length: 68:36
- Label: Funcom

Original Soundtrack (68:36)
No.	Title	Length
1.	"Dreamfall Theme / Tibet Monastery"	2:39
2.	"The Hospital Room" (vocals by Vivi Christensen)	2:23
3.	"Casablanca"	3:41
4.	"Jiva"	2:25
5.	"Reza's Apartment"	3:49
6.	"Northlands Forest"	3:13
7.	"Newport"	2:59
8.	"The Underground City"	2:40
9.	"Marcuria"	2:44
10.	"Meeting April Ryan / April's Theme"	2:22
11.	"Necropolis"	1:49
12.	"Sadir"	3:17
13.	"WATI Corp"	6:04
14.	"The Swamplands"	3:15
15.	"Kian's Theme"	2:54
16.	"Zoës Theme" (bonus track)	1:28
17.	"St. Petersburg" (by Simon Poole)	2:00
18.	"The Factory" (by Simon Poole)	1:12
19.	"Lana and Maud" (edit by Slipperhero)	2:09
20.	"Clay" (edit by Octavcat)	2:36
21.	"Rush" (by Ingvild Hasund)	3:16
22.	"Faith" (by Morten Sørlie)	9:31

All songs by the Norwegian singer Magnet that have been included into the game were released on a separate Magnet EP extended play CD released with the limited-edition version of the game. "Be With You", the only track composed specifically for the game, is heard on several occasions; in the lobby of Reza's apartment building, during Zoë's journeys to Japan and St. Petersburg, and during the closing credits. "My Darling Curse" plays when she takes a Vactrax to Newport, and "Nothing Hurts Now" is heard both when Zoë stays in Damien's apartment and in the very end, when she lies on her bed crying.

Magnet EP
No.	Title	Length
1.	"Be With You"	5:34
2.	"My Darling Curse"	4:26
3.	"The Pacemaker"	5:01
4.	"Nothing Hurts Now"	3:44

== Reception ==
=== Sales ===
In its second-quarter report for 2006, Funcom told investors that early sales of Dreamfall's computer version were "positive", while those of the Xbox release were "low". The company blamed this disparity on the Xbox's loss of market share to the Xbox 360. According to Funcom, revenues from Dreamfall totaled $2.64 million at the end of the second quarter, by which time roughly 300,000 copies of the game had been shipped to retailers. In its annual 2006 report, the company summarized Dreamfall's computer version as a "satisfactory" seller that drew revenues "above expectations". Sales and revenues of the Xbox release both failed to meet Funcom's forecasts.

Funcom estimated 200,000 copies of Dreamfall were downloaded illegally before release, and between 3 and 10 copies were illegally downloaded for every unit sold. A perceived loss of revenue due to piracy led the company to exit offline computer game development in 2007, in favor of online games such as Age of Conan, whose business model made them less vulnerable to piracy.

=== Critical reviews ===
Reception

Aggregate scores
Aggregator	Score
GameRankings	(PC) 77.48% (Xbox) 75.06%
Metacritic	(PC) 75/100 (Xbox) 73/100

Review scores
Publication	Score
GameSpot	8.1/10
GameSpy	5/5
IGN	7.5/10

Dreamfall: The Longest Journey was generally well-received by both critics and players. The media praised the story and the characterisation in the game, but criticized its fighting and stealth elements, as well as the abrupt cliffhanger ending. Aggregating review websites GameRankings and Metacritic gave the PC version 77.48% and 75/100 and the Xbox version 75.06% and 73/100.

GameSpy rated the game as "outstanding": "It's been a long-time [sic] since The Longest Journey was released, with fans of the game wondering whether a sequel could possibly match the original. They need wonder no longer. Dreamfall is an amazing journey that propels players into a world where science, magic, art, and music combine to make a whole much greater than the sum of its parts." GameSpot rated it as "great," stating "Dreamfall does not disappoint, for the most part. It exhibits the unique attention to detail and terrific presentation that made The Longest Journey so remarkable for its time." Adventure Classic Gaming said "It is contemporary interactive fiction at its best. Its unique blend of storytelling and gameplay should appeal to a broad range of gamers beyond those who are loyal to the adventure genre."

Other critics, while not disputing the quality of the story, were disappointed that the game is primarily story-driven, and would like to have seen more gameplay. For example, IGN opined: "While playing through, it's difficult to shake the impression that intelligent design was given a back seat to painfully simplistic fighting and sneaking sequences. The combat is, for all intents and purposes, a total joke. [...] While the gameplay has been drastically simplified, the story remains as engaging as ever. Characters engage in deep conversation, revealing all sorts of nuance and helping to strengthen this game's unique mood. Be warned, if you don't like watching lengthy conversations or if you generally disregard a game's plot, you'll be absolutely dissatisfied with Dreamfall. However, if you're in the mood for one of gaming's best and most recent narratives, by all means pick this one up. Just be aware that Dreamfall's appeal lies largely in its narrative and characters, and not in the gameplay."

The editors of Computer Games Magazine presented Dreamfall with their 2006 "Best Adventure Game" and "Best Original Music" awards. It was a runner-up for their list of the year's top 10 computer games. During the 10th Annual Interactive Achievement Awards, the Academy of Interactive Arts & Sciences nominated Dreamfall for "Outstanding Achievement in Story and Character Development".

Reflecting on the maligned combat and stealth sections, the developers noted that these mechanics were added to diversify the traditional graphic adventure game gameplay, but conceded that they had "failed to make those mechanics fun".

== Sequel and legacy ==
On 1 March 2007, Funcom announced that the continuation of the story would be published under the title Dreamfall Chapters. The numerous cliffhangers and apparent plot holes in Dreamfall have caused a great commotion among the players and were addressed by Ragnar Tørnquist on his blog. He stated that the game is, in fact, the first part of a duology and that all questions will be answered in the second installment. In November 2012, Ragnar Tørnquist's newly founded studio Red Thread Games began the pre-production of the sequel. Because Funcom's focus has shifted to online games, the company decided to license the rights to The Longest Journey IP to Tørnquist's development studio, who will fund and produce the game independently. A Kickstarter campaign to crowd-fund the game began in February 2013 and ended successfully raising $1.5 million in March. Tørnquist commented that the developers also considered the idea of making a film based on The Longest Journey or Dreamfall but found it too difficult to realize at the current stage.

In 2011, Adventure Gamers named Dreamfall the 52nd-best adventure game ever released.

== See also ==
- Fahrenheit (2005 video game) – 2005 action-adventure game
- Runaway 2: The Dream of the Turtle – 2006 video game
- Sherlock Holmes: The Awakened – 2007 video game
- Still Life 2 – 2009 video game
