= Nattväsen =

Studio album by Månegarm
- Released: 19 November 2009
- Genre: Viking metal
- Length: 45:06
- Label: Regain Records

Månegarm chronology
Vargstenen (2007)	Nattväsen (2009)	Legions of the North (2013)

Nattväsen (English: Night Creatures) is the sixth studio album by the Viking metal band Månegarm. It was released by Regain Records on 19 November 2009.

== Reception ==
The album received positive reviews. PowerMetal.de scored the album 9.5 out of 10, though the score dropped to 8.5 for the 2016 remaster. Rock Hard and Metal.de both gave 8 of 10.

== Track listing ==
Track number	Track title	Translation	Track length
1	Mina Fäders Hall	My Fathers' Hall	5:12
2	Nattsjäl, Drömsjäl	Nightsoul, Dreamsoul	5:54
3	Bergagasten	The Mountain Ghost	5:10
4	I den Svartaste Jord	In the Blackest Soil	7:17
5	Hraesvelg	Hraesvelg	1:48
6	Vetrarmegin	Winter Force	4:59
7	Draugen	Draugen	4:17
8	Nattväsen	Night Creatures	5:51
9	Delling	Dawn	4:38
