= Ragnar Tørnquist =

Norwegian game designer (born 1970)

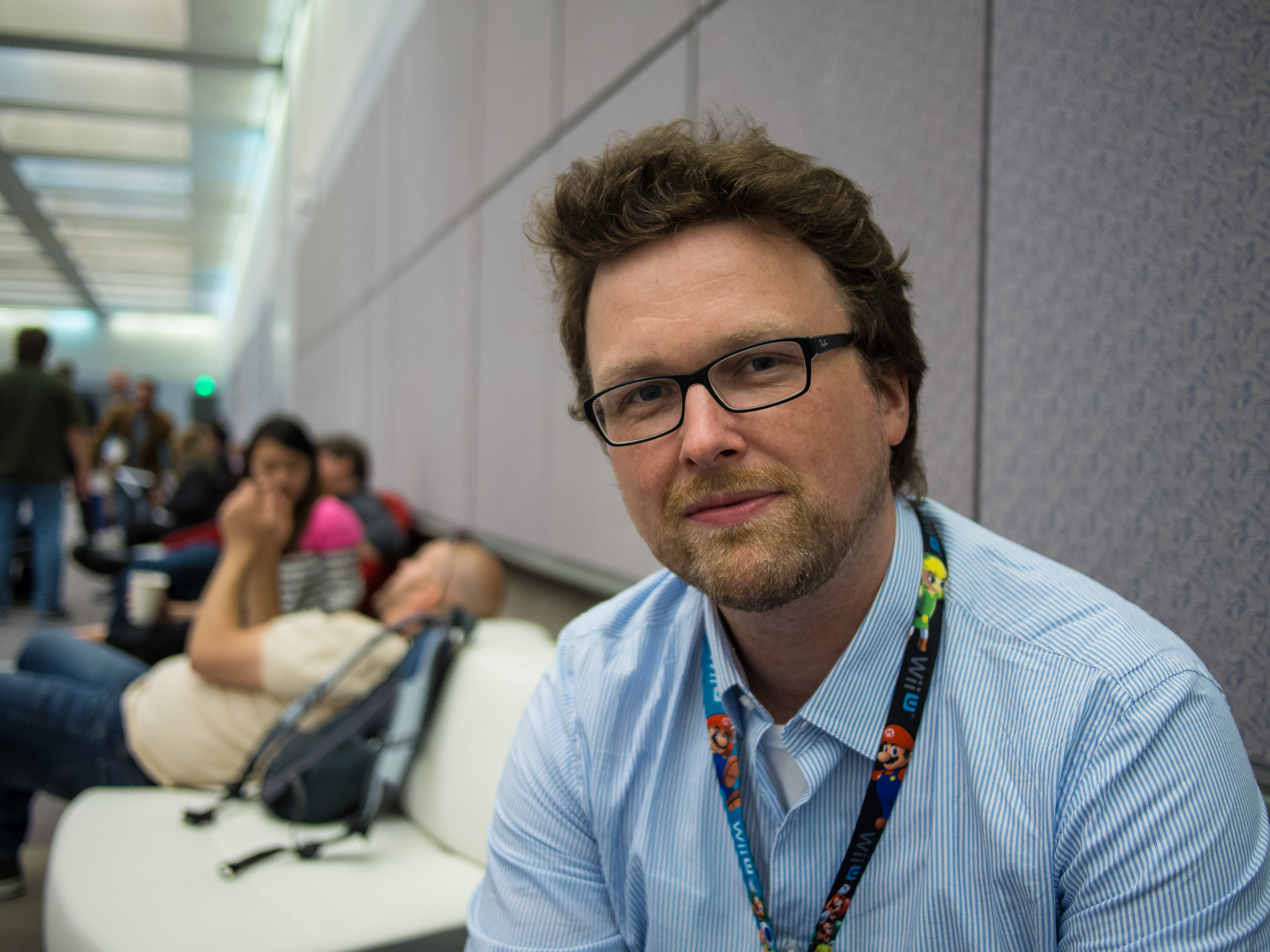
- Born: 31 July 1970 (age 55); Oslo, Norway
- Education: University of Oslo; Tisch School of the Arts
- Occupations: Video game designer, producer, writer
- Years active: 1994–present
- Employer(s): Funcom; Red Thread Games
- Notable work: The Longest Journey series Anarchy Online; The Secret World
- Children: 1

Ragnar Tørnquist (born 31 July 1970) is a Norwegian video game designer and writer. He has been working for Funcom in Oslo since 1994, and founded his own studio Red Thread Games in November 2012.

== Biography ==
Tørnquist studied art, history and English at St Clare's, a school in Oxford, from 1987 to 1989. From 1989 to 1990, he studied philosophy and English at the University of Oslo. After that, from 1990 to 1993 he attended the Undergraduate Film and Television department at the New York University's Tisch School of the Arts. His influences included Joss Whedon and Neil Gaiman.

In 1994, he returned to Oslo, Norway and started working for Funcom as producer, designer, writer, and level-editor of the video game adaptation of Casper. He felt that a new term was needed for a new generation of adventure games since "the classic point-and-click 'graphical adventure' is dead... The point of the 'modern adventure' [...] is to bring adventure gaming back into the mainstream, and to use technology and gameplay advances to bring the genre forward into the 'next generation'."

On 1 November 2012, Funcom announced that Tørnquist founded an independent game development studio Red Thread Games, which will continue developing The Longest Journey IP under license from Funcom. Simultaneously, Tørnquist stepped down as the Game Director of The Secret World to devote more time to the third entry in TLJ series, Dreamfall Chapters, while still working on TSW as the Creative Director.

Tørnquist is married and has one daughter.

== Games ==
- Casper (1996)
- Dragonheart: Fire & Steel (1996)
- The Longest Journey (1999)
- Anarchy Online (2001)
- Dreamfall: The Longest Journey (2006)
- The Secret World (2012)
- Dreamfall Chapters (2014–16)
- Draugen (2019)
- Dustborn (2024)
- Svalbard (TBA)

== Written works ==
=== Novels ===
- Anarchy Online – Prophet Without Honour (2001)

=== Short stories ===
- Rules are Rules

=== Screenplays ===
- In the Dark Places
