= The Longest Journey (video game) =

1999 video game

- Developer: Funcom
- Publishers: NOR: IQ Media Nordic; UK: Empire Interactive; NA: Tri Synergy
- Producer: Ragnar Tørnquist
- Designers: Didrik Tollefsen; Ragnar Tørnquist
- Programmers: Morten Lode; Audun Tørnquist
- Artist: Didrik Tollefsen
- Writer: Ragnar Tørnquist
- Composer: Bjørn Arve Lagim
- Platforms: Microsoft Windows, iOS
- Release: Windows: NOR: November 18, 1999; UK: April 20, 2000; NA: November 17, 2000; iOS: AU: October 28, 2014; WW: November 25, 2014
- Genre: Point-and-click adventure
- Mode: Single-player

The Longest Journey (Note: Bokmål: Den Lengste Reisen) is a point-and-click adventure game developed by Funcom, and released on Microsoft Windows in November 1999. An iOS version was later developed and released on October 28, 2014.

The game's story sees players assume the role of a young art student from Earth, who is thrust into an emerging situation that leads her into discovering about the existence of a parallel Earth where magic exists, and how a delicate balance that has kept the two worlds separate is now being thrown into chaos. The game's setting make uses of a mixture of science fiction elements, alongside high fantasy elements.

The Longest Journey received praise for its protagonist and complex storyline, though critics raised issues with the puzzles incorporated into the game. From release, the game was a commercial success, selling over 500,000 units by 2004, and later spawning two sequels - Dreamfall: The Longest Journey in 2006; and Dreamfall Chapters, an episodic sequel released over two years between 2014 and 2016.

== Gameplay ==
The Longest Journey is a point-and-click adventure game played from a third-person perspective, played out over a series of chapters in which the lead protagonist, April Ryan, must complete a series of tasks to advance the stories, ranging from talking to characters and solving puzzles. Conversation feature expansive record dialogue, most of which is non-essential to completing the game, but provides background to the characters, location and the lore of the story and its setting.

Actions and commands differ between systems - while on PC, players use the mouse to guide April's movements and interact with the environment using a cursor, which changes to reflect what actions can be performed, iOS users rely on the touch-screen to interact with objects and move the character. Icons help indicate what action can be performed by April with an object - examining an object via an Eye icon; talking to or consuming an object with a Mouth icon; and using an object or picking it up with a Hand icon. On PC, the cursor is an arrow by default, turning red to indicate an exit from a location, light blue to indicate an object with multiple actions to it. A map screen is used at times to move between major locations in the game, with new locations added as they are found out during the story. Puzzles often include subtle clues found in locations and NPC conversations that can help with solving them.

Items collected by April are held in an inventory, where they can be used to solve puzzles or be combined with other items - such items flash when over the appropriate object they can be used on. Some items that can be picked up or examined in a location go to a close-up shot, whereupon players can look for specific parts that stand out to interact with them (i.e. finding a hidden object hidden in another item). Alongside the inventory, players can find options for saving/loading a game, reviewing April's diary for information about key moments April has gone through in the game, options for changing the settings, and for quitting the game.

== Plot ==
=== Setting ===
The Longest Journey takes across two parallel worlds formed from the division of Earth: one known as Stark, a world driven by science and logic; the other known as Arcadia, a world governed by magic and inhabited by magical races and creatures. Prior to their creations, Earth originally was home to the powers of science and magic, which co-existed alongside each other until they were abused by humans. An alien race known as the "Draic Kin" (bearing the appearance of dragons) that had lived on Earth before the rise of humans, devised a plan to separate the powers of science and magic from each other before humanity destroyed itself. This plan required a single human to be chosen to become a divine cosmic being called the Guardian - an individual who would have powers that would make them live for a thousand years and be capable of keeping the two worlds separate. This harmonious division is referred to as "The Balance", protected by a group of twelve humans known as the Sentinel - six in Stark, and six in Arcadia - in order to prevent chaos being spawned and destroying both worlds.

Stark (based on the real-life Earth and its history, and set in the future within the year 2209) is depicted with many notable science fiction elements, including mega-corporations, genetics, new religions, hovercars, and space-travel and planetary colonies. By contrast, Arcadia is depicted with many notable high fantasy elements, including various fantasy-styled races and creatures, magic and a fictional fantasy-styled languages. The game's story takes place between the worlds of Stark - within the fictional US West Coast city of Newport - and Arcadia - within and around the lands and waters surrounding the city of Marcuria - alongside the realm of Guardian where the Balance between the two worlds is maintained.

=== Synopsis ===
April Ryan, an art student residing in Newport in 2209, finds herself experiencing odd dreams. After her latest one involves a meeting with a being called the "White Dragon", April is shocked when she experiences surreal dream-like events, some of which are witnessed by others. Seeking answers, she agrees to seek help from a local resident of her college neighbourhood of Venice, Manny Cortez, who sends her through a portal into a parallel world called Arcadia. On the other side, April finds herself in a temple within the city of Marcuria, where she encounters Tobias Grensret, a priest who serves a group called the Vestrum of the Sentinel. Initially unable to understand him, April decides to listen and magically gains the ability to speak in All-Tongue. Tobias, seeing she can now understand him, decides to explain to her what is going on.

April discovers that her world, referred to by Tobias as Stark, and Arcadia, are both parallel worlds created from a division of Earth thousands of years ago, in order to stop humanity abusing the powers of science and magic. To ensure a balance was maintained between the two worlds, a group of twelve individuals, six for magic, six for science, were led by four Draic Kin, dragon-like beings, into separating Earth into two worlds. To ensure the division would be successful and the worlds kept separate until the time of reunification, a single human was picked to act as a Guardian, who would be able to live for a thousand years, and preserve the worlds in harmony - referred to as the Balance. Before the four Draic Kin split up, two for each worlds, they left behind two discs: one to power the Balance in the Guardian's realm; the other to replace it should it ever break. Tobias further reveals that April has the power of a Shifter - an individual with the magical power to move between Stark and Arcadia freely, which Cortez had drawn out of April in order to send her to Arcadia.

Seeking to get back to Stark, April tracks down a Starkian named Brian Westhouse, who provides her with a pocket watch Cortez gave him before he came to Arcadia back in the 1930s. Returning to Stark, April learns from Cortez that the Balance has become endangered, as the current Guardian left their realm when their replacement failed to show, and a rogue group of Sentinels in Stark, calling themselves the Vanguard, seek to reunify Earth despite this being too soon to happen. Because of the Guardian's absence, April is told that recent events show chaos is beginning to be sown across Stark, and that Arcadia will be hit as well - the Vanguard attempting to influence people there to join in their efforts for reunification. To prevent this, Cortez explains that April must find several things - the second disc; information on the Vanguard and the location of the Guardian's successor; and the entrance to the Guardian's realm.

April manages to secure information on the Vanguard from the Newport police, and has it decoded by a hacker named Burns Flipper. Through the data, she learns the Vanguard are led by wealthy magnate Jacob McAllen, aided by Gordon Halloway - the Guardian's missing successor, who was experimented on by the Vanguard, changing him into a cold, logical man. Whilst waiting for a fake ID to be made by Burns, April experiences a Shift and returns to Arcadia. There she focuses on finding the second disc, as well as the gems needed to power it, completing a series of prophecies to claim each one on a journey beyond Marcuria, given a magical talisman by Tobias, while accompanied on her travels by a talking bird she calls Crow. Upon returning to the city with three of the Draic Kin gems, April is forced into a Shift back to Stark, where she learns Cortez was abducted during her time in Arcadia. Returning home to her college accommodation, she finds Halloway waiting for her with Vanguard troops, ready to seize what she acquired.

Forced to flee after the Vanguard kill some of her fellow roommates, April manages to escape through a Shift into the realm of Lady Alvane - the narrator of the story at the beginning. Despite some confusion, April is helped by Alvane to return to Arcadia, where she recovers the final gem for the disc, while learning the Vanguard's allies in Arcadia murdered Tobias. After discovering the second disc hidden in a library, April returns to Stark via a Shift, and then uses her power with her artwork to revisit the White Dragon. Before they die, they reveal April is their child, and sister to the next Draic Kin after her. Returning to Stark, April visits Burns for the fake ID needed to infiltrate the Vanguard's corporate front in Newport. Upon infiltrating their stronghold, April discovers that Cortez and McAllen are actually Draic Kin, with the latter forming the Vanguard in hopes of reunifying Stark and Arcadia, despite his brethen being against this. Cortez helps April to escape, whereupon he and McAllen seemingly die upon reverting back to their true form.

Returning to Burns, April finds the hacker was betrayed by the Vanguard, who stole the data he had acquired on the gateway to the Guardian's realm. Before dying, he reveals the gateway lies near to a space station, prompting April to pose as a colonist to board it. Whilst there, April encounters the missing Guardian, a man named Adrian, who warns her of the challenges she will face in his realm, believing her to be his successor. Venturing into the realm, April faces several trials, aided by Crow whom she reunites with, before facing off against Halloway. As Adrian fights with him, April uses the talisman she has to restore Halloway, by reunifying his logical self with his chaotic half that had been hounding April. With Halloway restored, he agrees to take over and become the new Guardian to restore the Balance, powered by the replacement disc.

In Lady Alvane's realm, she ends the story and sends away her listeners. Shortly afterwards, an elderly Crow arrives to meet her as an old friend, whereupon Alvane hints about telling another story concerning the events that would lead to the reunification of the world.

== Development ==
The player character, April Ryan, and several NPCs and objects were fully rendered by the development, who set them against a pre-rendered location that features minor animated sequences of objects and people.

The title of the game is a reference to the quote by the Swedish diplomat Dag Hammarskjöld: "The longest journey is the journey inward, for he who has chosen his destiny has started upon his quest for the source of his being." Other inspirations for the game included Gabriel Knight: Sins of the Fathers, Neil Gaiman's The Sandman and The Books of Magic, Hellblazer, Swamp Thing, Buffy the Vampire Slayer, and Joss Whedon's writing in general.

The Longest Journey was developed by a small internal team at Norwegian company Funcom led by Ragnar Tørnquist. It was their first original project. Funcom put few restrictions on the developers except the budget (approx. $2–3 million) and the deadline. Since the team had to develop the game engine and most of the required tools from scratch, they struggled to release the game on time. For most of 1999, the team had to work overtime and during weekends to ultimately meet the deadline. In the original Norwegian release, April Ryan was voiced by the journalist Synnøve Svabø.

First published by IQ Media Nordic in Norway in 1999, it was later localized for and released in France, the United Kingdom, Germany, Italy, Belgium, the Netherlands, Canada, Spain, Denmark, Finland, Sweden, Poland, Czech Republic, Russia, and the United States. The game was originally written and recorded in English, though most of the localizations were released before the English version. In October 2011, it was announced that The Longest Journey was being ported to iOS, with the article mainly focusing on the iPhone.

== Reception ==
Reception

Aggregate score
Aggregator	Score
Metacritic	91/100

Review scores
Publication	Score
Adventure Gamers	4.5/5
CNET Gamecenter	9/10
Computer Games Strategy Plus	4.5/5
Computer Gaming World	4.5/5
EP Daily	8.5/10
Eurogamer	9/10
GameRevolution	A−
GameSpot	9.3/10
GameSpy	92%
GameZone	9.4/10
IGN	9.3/10
Next Generation	3/5
PC Gamer (US)	90%
RPGFan	90%

The PC version received "universal acclaim" according to the review aggregation website Metacritic. It was praised for its female protagonist April Ryan, who is considered one of the most memorable female characters in the history of adventure games, (Note: GamePro gave the PC version two 4.5/5 scores for graphics and sound, 4/5 for control, and a perfect 5/5 for fun factor.) and also for its enigmatic, complex storyline and high production values, but was criticized for some of its more obscure puzzles. GameSpot called it "one of the best adventure games in years" and applauded the "complex and interesting story", but found the ending lacking as "the epilogue does little to wrap everything up". IGN said the game "actually reinvents how stories can be told in the medium" and noticed the mature content, including "harsh subject matter, and some big time swearing". Some of the puzzles were described as "inane", but on the whole the game "hones the genre into its tightest, sharpest form yet". The US edition of PC Gamer praised the "mature and magical" story, the "sumptuous" graphics, and the game's puzzles. The only criticism levied by the magazine was that some parts of the game might be "too edgy" for younger players. AllGame gave it a score of four stars out of five, saying that it was "definitely not the kind of game everyone will appreciate and, in fact, may be unplayable after five minutes for some gamers. However, for anyone willing to give it half a chance, the game can provide the same kind of enthralling entertainment as the most meticulously crafted mystery novel or film, perhaps even rekindling a lost sense of wonder in the way reality really works." Eric Bratcher of NextGen, however, called it "a potential epic that seems to have taken tranquilizers. It's still worthwhile, but it's also a little slow [and] a little dull, and [it] sometimes just doesn't make sense."

=== Sales ===
Before its release, The Longest Journey received positive preview coverage and was heavily promoted in Norway. Dagbladet described the title as "the first big Norwegian computer game." Its target demographics were outside the industry's norm: Ragnar Tørnquist reported that Funcom wanted to capture "a more adult audience in addition to the usual teenage buyers". The game's high budget meant that 150,000 sales were necessary to break even. However, Norway's market for games was small. According to Herman Berg of Digi.no, it was rare for a game's Norwegian sales to reach 10,000 units. The game's domestic sales goal was 15,000 units, while its global lifetime goal was 300,000 units. Funcom shipped 15,000 units of the game to Norwegian retailers in the game's first month and a half on shelves, and publisher IQ Media noted that sell-through and store re-orders were high through late December. Sell-in had reached 10,000 units in Sweden by that time. Based on the available data, IQ's Nickolay Nickelsen noted that it "looks as if half of the players are actually girls."

According to Tørnquist, the game experienced "solid sales across Europe" before its release in the U.S. The game sold 15,000 units in Norway by May 2000, while overall European sales totaled 100,000 units by September 2000. It launched in Germany with a shipment of 40,000 units to retailers; Chris Kellner of DTP Entertainment, which handled the game's German localization, reported its lifetime sales between 10,000 and 50,000 units in that market. In Spain, the game sold 50,000 units after roughly one year, a commercial hit for the country. Its English release was purposely delayed to prevent imports from cannibalizing local sales across Europe.

The game struggled to find a North American publisher. According to market research firm PC Data, North American sales of the game reached 12,495 retail units by the end of 2000, of which 10,873 were sold in December. By January 2001, global sales totaled almost 200,000 units. PC Data reported an additional 40,160 retail sales of the game in North America during the first six months of 2001. By that June, the game's worldwide sales had climbed to 250,000 units, of which the U.S. accounted for 90,000. PC Data's estimate for the title's North American sales for January–December 2001 was 71,962 retail units, followed by another 12,044 in the first six months of 2002. By July 2002, global sales of the game had reached 450,000 units, according to Funcom. A new shipment was released in North America that month, as its earlier printing had sold out. Ragnar Tørnquist noted in 2003 that he was "very satisfied" with the game's sales in North America, and explained, "There was such strong word of mouth, and so many great reviews, that we managed to get TLJ into most big stores and out to the players regardless of marketing."

In May 2003, Marek Bronstring of Adventure Gamers wrote that the game "sold half a million copies worldwide and it's still selling, making it one of the most successful adventure games in recent years." The following year, IGN reported that its sales had surpassed 500,000 units. The site's Richard Aihoshi summarized the game as "a critical and commercial success". In 2019, Tørnquist recalled that "at least 50 per cent" of the game's players were female, a fact that he believed increased its commercial success.

=== Awards ===
The game was named the best computer adventure game of 2000 by Computer Gaming World in its 2001 Premier Awards, The Electric Playground's Blister 2000 Awards, GameSpot's Best and Worst of 2000 Awards, IGN's Best of 2000 Awards in Editor's Choice (which was also a runner-up in Reader's Choice) and the Seventh Annual PC Gamer Awards, and was nominated in the category by CNET Gamecenter's Computer Game Awards for 2000 and Computer Games Magazine (the latter whose winner remains unknown). It also won IGN's "Best Game No One Played" and GameSpot's "Best Story" awards, and was a runner-up for the former website's "Best Storyline" award in Editor's Choice, and for the latter website's "Best Graphics, Artistic" award, which went to Sacrifice. The game was also nominated for The Electric Playground's "Best Game of the Year" award, which went to Deus Ex. Computer Gaming World's staff praised the game for offering "a mature, literate, and compelling story featuring a strong female heroine who, for once, is not exploited for her looks."

The game was a finalist for the "Sound Design" award at the AIAS' 4th Annual Interactive Achievement Awards, which ultimately went to Medal of Honor: Underground.

In 2011, Adventure Gamers named it the second-best adventure game ever released.

== Sequels ==
A sequel to The Longest Journey began production in early 2003. The game, Dreamfall: The Longest Journey, was released in April 2006. The developers viewed the sequel as more of a spin-off than a direct sequel to the first game, as it revolves around a new protagonist, with a new storyline.

The next installment of the series, Dreamfall Chapters, was crowd-funded on Kickstarter and was released episodically. Its first episode was released in October 2014. The last episode shipped in June 2016.

Plans for a direct sequel to The Longest Journey, entitled The Longest Journey Home, were revealed in 2013. In 2016, Ragnar Tørnquist stated that even though he wants to produce the game, there are many reasons why it may never happen.
