= Norwegian Film Institute =

Norwegian government agency

Norsk filminstitutt

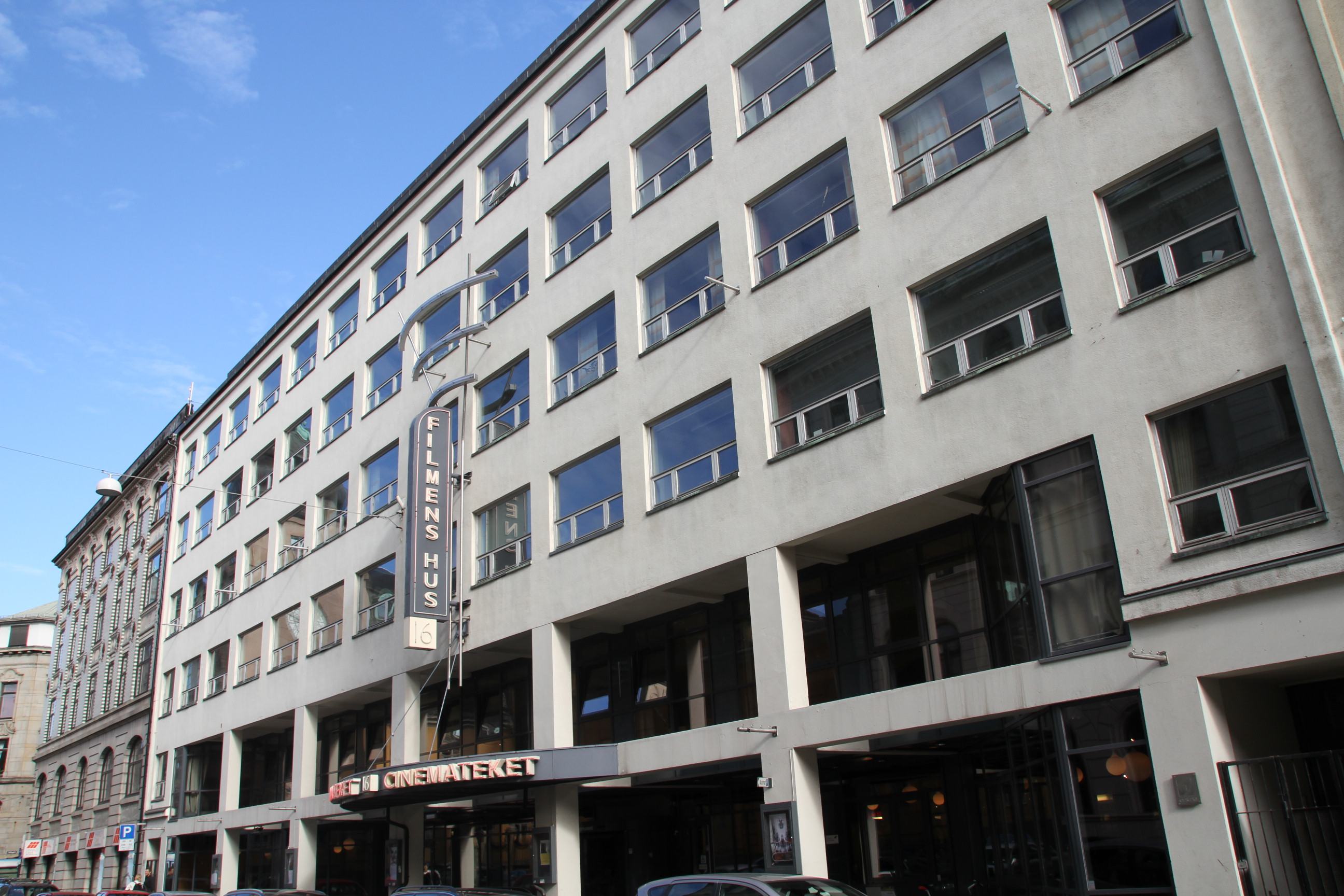
- Filmens hus, the NFI headquarters in Oslo
- Formation: 3 May 1955; 70 years ago
- Type: Government agency
- Headquarters: Oslo, Norway
- Coordinates: 59°54′34″N 10°44′45″E
- Region served: Norway
- Official language: Norwegian
- CEO: Sindre Guldvog
- Parent organization: Royal Norwegian Ministry of Culture
- Staff: 100
- Website: www.nfi.no

The Norwegian Film Institute (Norwegian: Norsk filminstitutt) (NFI) is a Norwegian government agency that supports and develops the Norwegian film industry.

== History ==
The Norwegian Film Institute was founded in 1955 to support and develop Norwegian cinema.

On 1 April 2008, it was merged with Norwegian Film Fund, Norwegian Film Development, and Norwegian Film Commission to form a new body under the same name, under the auspices of the Royal Norwegian Ministry of Culture. In 2020, the Norwegian Film Commission was separated from the Norwegian Film Institute and established as an independent agency.

In 2020, the Norwegian Film Commission was established as a separate entity, taking over the task of supporting international films being filmed in Norway from the Norwegian Film Institute.

== Description ==
The NFI is a member of the International Federation of Film Archives, the International Council of Educational Media, European Film Academy, and Scandinavian Films, and represents Norway in Eurimages and the European Audiovisual Observatory.

A large amount of the library's archives are stored in a high-security bunker in Mo i Rana.

== See also ==
- List of film institutes
- Association of European Film Archives and Cinematheques (ACE)
